= List of fellows of the Nigerian Academy of Science =

The Nigerian Academy of Science is the official science academy of Nigeria. It is the apex scientific organization in Nigeria and fellow of the academy are often elected following a nomination of qualified candidate by a fellow of the academy, known as the principal nominator, who must be in the same academic field as the candidate.

This is the List of fellows of the Nigerian Academy of Science arranged by year.

List of fellows
Year of election	Fellow	Field(s) of work; academia/industry	Refs.
1977	Anthony Afolabi Adegbola	Animal Science	
1977	Oluwafeyisola Sylvester Adegoke	Geology	
1977	I.A. Akinrele	Industrial chemistry	
1977	J.B.E. Awachie	Zoology	
1977	Olumuyiwa Awe	Physics	
1977	Olumbe Bassir	Nutrition and Biochemistry Toxicology	
1977	Mark O. Chijioke	Electrical engineering	
1977	Emmanuel Emovon	Chemistry	
1977	A.I.I. Ette	Physics	
1977	Akinyele Fabiyi	Virology	
1977	Theodore Idibiye Francis	Medicine	
1977	T. Adesanya Ige-Grillo	Anatomy	
1977	Awele Maduemezia	Physics	
1977	Adetokunbo Lucas	International Health	
1977	Chike Obi	Mathematics	
1977	Agu U. Ogan	Biochemistry	
1977	Theophilus Oladipo Ogunlesi	Medicine	
1977	Bede Nwoye Okigbo	Agronomy	
1977	Cyril Agodi Onwumechili	Physics	
1977	Anthony Momodu Oseni	Forestry	
1977	Benjamin Oluwakayode Osuntokun	Medicine	
1977	Mosobalaje Olaloye Oyawoye	Geology	
1977	Victor Adenuga Oyenuga	Animal science	
1977	Ayodele Tella	Pharmacology	
1977	Samuel Afolabi Toye	Zoology	
1977	Frank Mene Adedemiswanye Ukoli	Zoology	
1977	Patrick Iloba Amenechi	Chemistry	
1977	Augustine Njoku-Obi	Microbiology	
1977	Babatunde Kwaku Adadevoh	Chemical pathology	
1977	Ifedayo Olawole Oladapo	Civil engineering	
1977	Caleb Isaac Olawole Olaniyan	Zoology	
1977	Iya Abubakar	Mathematics	
1977	Emmanuel Ayotunde Yoloye	Science education	
1977	Samuel O. Alasoadura	Botany	
1977	James Okoye Chukuka Ezeilo	Mathematics	
1977	Gabriel Ediale Osuide	Neuropharmacology	
1977	Babatunde Olusiji Osunkoya	Immunology	
1977	Fabian Anene Osita Udekwu	Theoracic surgery	
1977	Donald Efiong Udo Ekong	Chemistry	
1977	Herbert C. Kodilinye	Ophtalmology	
1977	Umaru Shehu	Health resources and management	
1977	Alexander Eyimofe Boyo	Pathology	
1979	Samuel N.C. Okonkwo	Botany	
1979	Anya Oko Anya	Zoology	
1979	Nduka Okafor	Microbiology	
1979	Joseph Ibomein Okogun	Organic and natural products chemistry	
1979	Cyril Obiora Enwonwu	Medicine	
1980	Timothy Ajibola Taylor	Agriculture	
1980	Oladipo Olujimi Akinkugbe	Medicine	
1980	Alexander Obiefoka Enukora Animalu	Physics and mathematics	
1980	Joseph Chike Edozien	Medicine (chemical pathology)	
1980	Deborah Enilo Ajakaiye	Physics	
1980	Adegoke Olubummo	Mathematics	
1981	Cornelius O. Orangun	Civil and structural engineering	
1981	Lateef Akinola Salako	Medicine (Pharmacology)	
1981	Osondu John Eze-Uzomaka	Civil engineering	
1981	Sunday Osarumwense Iyahen	Mathematics	
1982	George Joseph Folayan Esan	Medicine	
1982	Samuel Ejikeme Okoye	Physics	
1983	Anthony Malomo Adia Imevbore	Zoology	
1985	John Chukwuemeka Amazigo	Mathematics	
1985	Cornelius Adedapo Kogbe	Geology	
1985	Akin O. Adesola	Medicine (Surgery)	
1985	Henry Ehikpehale Enahoro	Mechanical engineering	
1986	Charles Okolo Okafor	Chemistry	
1986	Chukwuedu Nwokolo	Medicine	
1986	Gabriel Ayodele Makanjuola	Agricultural Engineering	
1987	Gabriel Babatunde Ogunmola	Biophysical chemistry biotechnology	
1987	Adelola Adeloye	Medicine	
1987	Andrew Oteku Evwaraye	Physicss	
1988	Olusegun Ladimeji Oke	Nutritional Chemistry	
1988	Joshua Ajadi Faniran	Chemistry	
1988	Vincent Olusegun S. Olunloyo	Engineering	
1989	David Uke Ukiwe Okali	Forest biology, environment and conservation	
1989	Aderemi Oluyomi Kuku	Mathematics	
1990	Sulaiman Adeniyi Adekola	Electrical / electronic engineering	
1990	Etim Moses Essien	Haematology	
1990	Joseph Yusuf Yayock	Agriculture and agronomy	
1990	Idris Mohammed	Medicine	
1991	Gordian Obuneme Ezekwe	Engineering	
1991	David Tinakpoewan Okpako	Pharmacology	
1991	Ephraim Efiong Okon	Engineering Science	
1991	Oyewale Tomori	Virology	
1991	Haroon Oladipo Tejumola	Mathematics	
1992	Alexander D. Wozuzu Acholonu	Parasitology / microbiology	
1992	Jibril Muhammadu Aminu	Medicine	
1992	Olikoye Ransome-Kuti	Medicine	
1994	Elijah D. Mshelia	Theoretical Nuclear Physics	
1994	Paul O. Okonkwo	Molecular and ethnopharmacology	
1994	Mark Nwagwu	Zoology	
1994	Alfred A. Susu	Chemical engineering	
1996	Patrick Obi Ngoddy	Agric and food engineering	
1997	Njidda M. Gadzama	Zoology	
1997	Tolu Odugbemi	Parasitology / microbiology	
1997	Oladunni G. Olaniyan-Taylor	Chemical pathology	
1997	Bartholomew Nnaji	Industrial engineering	
1998	Vincent E. Aimakhu	Obsttrics and gynaecology	
1998	Olabopo Osuntokun	Medicine / ophthalmology	
1998	Emmanuel O. Anosike	Enzymology / protein chemistry	
1998	Emmanuel Uche Odigboh	Agricultural engineering	
1998	Pius N. Okeke	Astronomy and space science	
1998	Kalu Mosto Onuoha	Pure and applied geophysics	
1999	Edward 'B. Attah	Human pathology	
1999	Cajetan Ezeani Okeke	Physics	
1999	Raifu Isola Salawu	Electrical / electronic engineering and renewable energy	
1999	Charles O. Wambebe	Pharmacology	
2000	Yetunde Mercy Olumide	Medicine / dermatology	
2000	Timothy A. I. Akeju	Civil Engineering	
2000	E. Efiom Ene-Obong	Plant breeding and crop biotechnology	
2000	Augustine O. Esogbue	Intelligent systems and control engineering	
2000	Sunday W. Petters	Geology	
2002	Abubakar S. Sambo	Mechanical engineering	
2002	Gabriel I. Ekeke	Biochemistry	
2002	Pius J. Egbelu	Industrial engineering	
2002	Salihu Mustafa	Civi l/ Water resources engineering	
2004	Gabriel O. Ajayi	Physics / electro. and elect. engineering	
2004	Lekan S. Salimonu	Chemical pathology	
2004	Alphonso C.I. Anusiem	Chemistry	
2004	Sunday A. Bwala	Medicine (neurology)	
2004	Akintoye Olusegun Coker	Parasitology / microbiology	
2004	Olusegun Ekundayo	Chemistry	
2004	Ayodele O. Falase	Medicine / cardiology	
2004	Oyewusi Ibidapo-Obe	Stochastic control and information systems engineering	
2004	Turner T. Isoun	Veterinary medicine	
2004	Timothy U. Obi	Veterinary medicine	
2006	Israel F Adu	Animal nutrition	
2006	Ibironke Akinsete	Heamatology	
2006	Gabriel Kayode Falade	Petroleum engineering	
2006	Domingo Amechi Okorie	Chemistry	
2006	Babatunde Owolabi Onadeko	Respiratory medicine	
2006	Babatunde Osotimehin	Medicine / chemical pathology	
2006	Akinola Muritala Salau	Solid State Physics / Devices	
2006	Olusoga Sofola	Physiology	
2006	Olaitan Soyannwo	Anaesthesia / pain management	
2006	Ekanem Ikpi Braide	Parasitology / epidemiology	
2006	Adeyinka Afolayan	Enzymology/Protein Science	
2006	Samuel Akindiji Ilori	Mathematics	
2006	Emmanuel Chukwuemeka Okafor	Chemistry	
2006	M. Temitayo Shokunbi	Developmental neurosciences / paediatric neurology	
2006	Charles E. Chidume	Mathematics	
2007	Abayomi Olusola Akanji	Medicine-endocrinology and metabolic medicine	
2007	Gabriel N. Egbunike	Animal science	
2007	Ifeanyi Charles Ume	Mechanical engineering	
2007	Nimi Dimkpa Briggs	Medicine	
2007	Olusegun O. Adewoye	Material science	
2007	Oyebiodun Grace Longe	Nutritional biochemistry	
2007	Wole Soboyejo	Material Science and Engineering	
2008	Olufemi Adebisi Bamiro	Mechanical engineering	
2008	Martin Anthony C. Aghaji	Cardio-thoracic surgery	
2008	Olukayode Dada	Laboratory medicine (chemical pathology)	
2008	Ikenna Onyido	Mechanistic and bioorganic chemistry	
2009	Michael U. Adikwu	Pharmacy / pharmaceutics	
2009	Tom A. Aire	Veterinary medicine	
2009	Adeyinka G. Falusi	Haematology	
2009	Rotimi A. Oderinde	Industrial chemistry	
2009	Celestine O. Onwuliri	Zoology	
2009	Peter Azikiwe Onwualu	Agricultural power and machinery	
2009	Olugbemiro Sodeinde	Paediatrics	
2010	Nicholas A. Damachi	Industrial engineering / science public policy	
2010	Abba B. Gumel	Mathematics	
2010	Sonny F. Kuku	Endocrinology	
2010	Siyanbola Malomo	Geology	
2010	Francisca Nneka Okeke	Geomagnetism / conospheric physics	
2011	Mohammed K. Abubakar	Biochemistry	
2011	Babajide Ibitayo Alo	Organic and environmental chemistry	
2011	Chinedum Peace Babalola	Pharmacy / pharmacokinetics	
2011	Boniface C.E. Egboka	Hydrogeology	
2011	Obioma C. Nwaorgu	Parasitology and entomology	
2011	Adetokunbi B. Sofoluwe	Computer science	
2011	Isaac F. Adewole	Obstetrics and gynaecology	
2012	Mojeed Olayide Abass	Computer science	
2012	Kayode Oyebode Adebowale	Industrial chemistry	
2012	Isaac Adebayo Adeyemi	Food science	
2012	Victor Onwubalili Anosa	Veterinary pathology	
2012	Akaehomen O. Akii Ibhadode	Manufacturing engineering	
2012	Andrew Jonathan Nok	Biochemistry	
2012	Friday E. Okonofua	Obstetrics and gynaecology	
2012	Abel Idowu Olayinka	Geology	
2012	Akinyhinka Omokolapo Omigbodun	Obstetrics and gynaecology	
2012	Alfred B.O. Soboyejo	Aeronautical and astronautically / Agricultural and biological engineering	
2013	Sunday Ene-ojo Atawodi	Biochemistry	
2013	Tola Atinmo	Nutrition	
2013	Chukwudozie Daniel Ezeokoli	Veterinary medicine	
2013	Oye Gureje	Medicine – Psychiatry	
2013	Isa Marte Hussaini	Pharmacology	
2013	John Alechenu Idoko	Medicine	
2013	Oladele O. Kale	Public Health	
2013	James Adeche Momoh	Electrical engineering	
2013	Sunday Ayodele Odunfa	Microbiology	
2013	Patience Ogoamaka Osadebe	Pharmaceutical and medicinal chemistry	
2014	John Adeyinka Adekoya	Geology	
2014	John Okhienaiye Agbenin	Soil environmental chemistry	
2014	Dennies Edokpaigbe Agbonlahor	Medical microbiology / medical laboratory science	
2014	Joseph Eberendu Ahaneku	Chemical pathology / clinical chemistry	
2014	Patrick Oladipo Aina	Soil physics	
2014	Ebenezer Olatunde Farombi	Biochemistry	
2014	Chidi Adonis Ibe	Oceanography / scientific research	
2014	Adekunle Odunsi	Gynecologic oncology / medicine	
2014	Joseph Olorunfemi Ojo	Electrical and computer engineering (power electronics)	
2014	Wuraola Adebola Shokunbi	Haematology	
2015	Oluwole Agbede	Water resources / geotechnical engineering	
2015	Uche V. Amazigo	Medical parasitology	
2015	Oluwole B. Familoni	Chemistry	
2015	Kehinde O. Ladipo	Geology	
2015	Emmanuel Maduagwu	Biochemistry	
2015	David Mba	Mechanical engineering	
2015	Jude U. Ohaeri	Medicine (psychiatry)	
2015	Sunny E. Ohia	Pharmacology	
2015	Jarlath U. Umoh	Veterinary public health / veterinary medicine	
2016	Olanike Kudirat Adeyemo	Aquatic epidemiology and toxicology	
2016	Mojisola Christianah Adeyeye	Pharmacy and pharmaceutics	
2016	Peter Achuike Akah	Pharmacology	
2016	Musibau Adewunmi Akanji	Biochemistry	
2016	Chidi Emmanuel Akujor	Physics	
2016	Edith Oriabure Ajaiyeoba	Pharmacognosy	
2016	Catherine Olufunke Falade	Pharmacology and therapeutics	
2016	Timothy Isioma Odiaka	Organometallic chemisry	
2016	Micah Okwuchukwu Osilike	Mathematics	
2017	Effiom Edem Antia	Oceanography	
2017	Joseph Abiodun Balogun	Health Sciences / physiotherapy	
2017	Charles Okechukwu Esimone	Pharmacy (biopharmaceutics and pharmaceutical biotech)	
2017	Karniyus Shingu Gamaniel	Pharmacy	
2017	Oluwatoyin Temitayo Ogundipe	Botany	
2017	Folasade Ogunsola	Medicine	
2017	Emiola O. Olapade-Olaopa	Medicine	
2017	Martins Olusola Olorunfemi	Applied geophysics	
2017	Mufutau Babs Oyeneyin	Petroleum engineering	
2018	J. Chukwuemeka Agunwamba	Water resources and environmental engineering	
2018	Samuel Olusegun Akande	Geology	
2018	Jonathan Oyebamiji Babalola	Biophsical Chemistry	
2018	Suleiman Elias Bogoro	Animal science and agriculture	
2018	Henrietta Nkechi Ene-Obong	Human nutrition	
2018	Jacob Kwada Paghi Kwaga	Veterinary sciences	
2018	Iruka Nwamaka Okonta Okeke	Pharmaceutical Microbiology	
2018	Mayowa Ojo Owolabi	Medical science and neurosciences	
2019	Isaac Uzoma Asuzu	Veterinary pharmacology and toxicology	
2019	Nduka Nnamdi Ekere	Manufacturing engineering	
2019	Matthew Olusoji Ilori	Environmental microbiology	
2019	Gabriel Ayowole Kolawole	Coordination and material chemistry	
2019	Bertram Ekejiuba Nwoke	Public health parasitology and entomology	
2019	Oluwatoyin Adepeju Odeku	Pharmaceutics and pharm technology	
2019	Adesola Ogunniyi	Neurology	
2019	Olayinka Olusola Omigbodun	Psychiatry	
2019	Michael Obi Onyekonwu	Petroleum engineering	
2020	Lawrence Ikechukwu Ezemonye	Ecotoxicology and environmental forensics	
2020	Ibrahim Garba	Geology	
2020	Grace Olusola Gbotosho	Pharmacology	
2020	Adenike Temidayo Oladiji	Biochemistry (nutrition)	
2020	Ogbonnaya Onu	Chemical engineering	
2020	Obinna Onwujekwe	Pharmaco-economics / pharmaco-epidemiology	
2020	Babatunde Lawal Salako	Internal medicine (nephrology)	
2020	Lateef Oladimeji Sanni	Food science and technology	
2020	Augustine Ubachukwu	Astrophysics	
2020	Babafemi Taiwo	Medicinal sciences	
2021	Bolanle Alake Adeniyi	Microbiology	
2021	Emmanuel Adoyi Ameh	Paediatric surgery	
2021	Olukayode Amund	Petroleum/environmental microbiology	
2021	Joseph Olusegun Ayo	Veterinary physiology	
2021	Adekunle Akeem Bakare	Genetic, cell and molecular toxicology	
2021	Charles Arizechukwu Igwe	Soil conservation / soil physics	
2021	James Chukwuma Ogbonna	Fermentation technology and bioprocess	
2021	Benjamen Uzochukwu	Public health and community medicine	
2021	Musa Toyin Yakubu	Medicinal plant biochemistry / biochemical toxicology	

== Foreign fellows ==
List of foreign fellows
Year of election	Fellow	Field(s) of work; academia/industry	Refs.
2010	Ahmed Zewail	Chemistry	
2011	Bruce Alberts	Biochemistry / molecular biology	
2012	Michael T. Clegg	Biological sciences	
