= Isaac Adewole =

Nigerian professor of gynaecology and obstetrics (born 1954)

Prof. Isaac Adewole
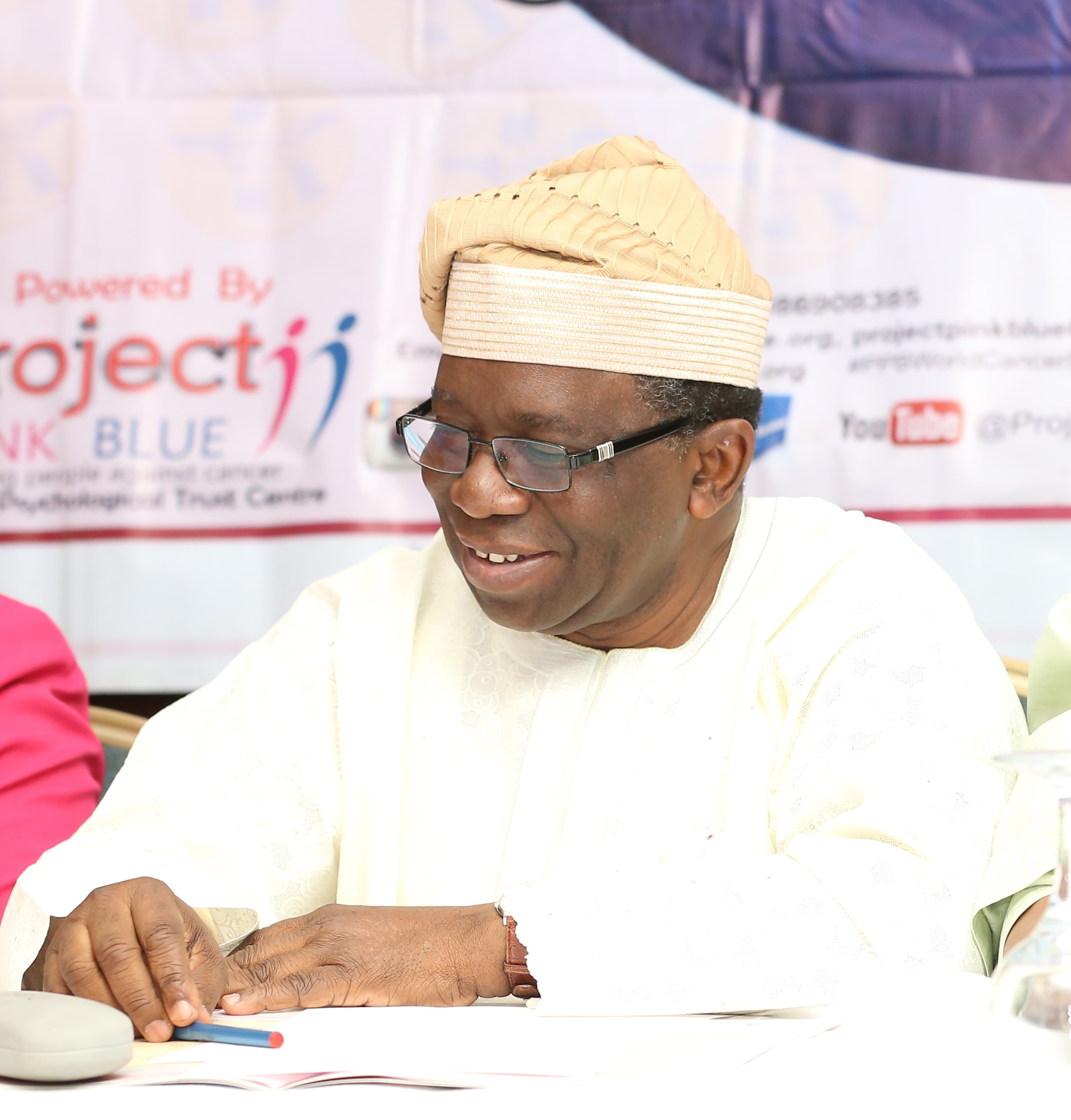

Minister of Health
- In office 11 November 2015 – 29 May 2019
- President: Muhammadu Buhari
- Preceded by: Haliru Alhassan
- Succeeded by: Osagie Ehanire

11th Vice-Chancellor of the University of Ibadan
- In office December 2010 – 30 November 2015
- Deputy: Abel Idowu Olayinka
- Preceded by: Olufemi Bamiro
- Succeeded by: Abel Idowu Olayinka

Personal details
- Born: 5 May 1954 (age 72) Ilesa, Southern Region, British Nigeria (now in Osun State, Nigeria)
- Education: University of Ibadan
- Occupation: Obstetrician; Gynecologist; Academics; Educational administrator

Isaac Folorunso Adewole FAS (born 5 May 1954) is a Nigerian professor of gynaecology and obstetrics. He was minister of health of Nigeria from November 2015 to May 2019 under the Cabinet of President Muhammadu Buhari. He is a former vice-chancellor of the University of Ibadan, and president of the African Organisation for Research and Training in Cancer.

Prior to his appointment as the 11th substantive vice-chancellor of the university, he served as provost at the College of Medicine, University of Ibadan, the largest and oldest medical school in Nigeria. His research interest is in the area of human papillomavirus, HIV, and gynaecologic oncology, a specialised field of medicine that focuses on cancers of the female reproductive system, including ovarian cancer, uterine cancer, vaginal cancer, cervical cancer, and vulvar cancer. Adewole is a member of the governing council of Adeleke University and chairs the National Panel on Cervical Cancer Control Policy. He is the only Nigerian professor appointed as member of the Council of the Association of Commonwealth Universities. He was appointed to serve as a member of the international advisory board of the African Cancer Institute, a comprehensive cancer centre in sub-Saharan black Africa.

In 2014, he celebrated his 60th birthday. In a public lecture held at the International Conference Centre of the University of Ibadan, it was recalled how maligners tried relentlessly to sabotage his appointment as the vice-chancellor of the institution in 2010. The chairman of the 60th birthday celebration was Wole Olanipekun, a legal luminary, Senior Advocate of Nigeria, former president of the Nigerian Bar Association, and a past Pro-Chancellor of the university. He described Adewole as a "cat not only with nine lives, but one with 18 lives, who surmounted all the travails and conspiratorial petitions hatched against him by his maligners." In 2012, he was elected as a Fellow of the Nigerian Academy of Science, the apex academic organisation in Nigeria. He was inducted into the academy along with Professor Mojeed Olayide Abass, a Nigerian professor of computer science at the University of Lagos, and Professor Akinyinka Omigbodun, the president of the West African College of Surgeons and former provost of the College of Medicine, University of Ibadan.

In 2014, he was appointed as a member of Adeleke University's governing council and in June 2015 he was appointed as a member of Pan-African University's governing council. Pan-African University is a post-graduate training and research network of university apex in five regions, supported by the African Union. On 28 March 2015, he was appointed as the Independent National Electoral Commission's Collation Officer in Lagos State for the Nigerian general election, 2015 and on 11 April, he served as returning officer for the Lagos State gubernatorial election. On 11 November 2015 he was appointed Minister for Health of the Federal Republic of Nigeria.

== Early life ==
Adewole was born on 5 May 1954 in Ilesa, a city in Osun State in southwestern Nigeria. His parents are traders, and his choice of career was informed by his father, who was an agent of the United Africa Company, a British company that principally traded in West Africa during the 20th century.

His initial plan was to choose a career in aeronautics, particularly aerospace engineering, though his school guidance counselor suggested subjects that were useful for a career in medicine. In 1960, he attended Ogudu Methodist Primary School, Ilesa, where he spent one year, and Methodist School, Oke Ado in Ibadan, where he also spent one year before completing his primary education at St .Mathias Demonstration School, Akure. He later attended Ilesa Grammar School, where he obtained a Grade I certificate with distinction in 1970 and a Higher School Certificate (HSC) in 1972. In October 1973, he enrolled at the College of Medicine, University of Ibadan; there he obtained an MBBS degree and, in 1978, won the Glaxo Allenbury Prize for outstanding performance in paediatrics.

== Career ==
In 1978, the same year he graduated from the University of Ibadan, he joined the University College Hospital, Ibadan. In 1979, he left the hospital for Sokoto for a compulsory year of service in the National Youth Service Corps. On completion of his service, he worked for a year as a medical officer at Adeoyo Maternity Hospital, Ibadan, before returning to the college hospital as a senior house officer of the department of obstetrics and gynaecology. He held the position for one year before he was appointed registrar in 1982. In 1985, he left Nigeria for a research fellowship in the department of medical oncology at Charing Cross Hospital in London. Following completion of the fellowship programme, he returned to Nigeria to join the Royal Crown Specialist Hospital, Ibadan, where he spent four years before returning to the University College Hospital as Consultant obstetrician and gynaecologist.

He began his academic career as lecturer grade I at the College of Medicine, University of Ibadan, where he became a senior lecturer in 1992. On 1 October 1997, he was appointed a professor of medicine at the University of Ibadan, the same year he was appointed as a member of the University Senate. In 1999, he was appointed as acting head of the department of obstetrics and gynaecology. He served in that capacity for one year. On 1 August 2000, he was appointed as the Dean, Faculty of Clinical Sciences and Dentistry, a position he held until 31 July 2002. On 1 August 2002 he was appointed as provost, college of medicine and was succeeded by Professor Akinyinka Omigbodun. While serving in this capacity, he was member of the committee of provost and deans as well as chairman, university campus committee on AIDS. He also served as chairman of the committee on evaluation of academic staff in 2004. On 1 May 2010, he became an adjunct professor at Northwestern University in Chicago. In December 2010, he was appointed as the 11th substantive vice-chancellor of the University of Ibadan, succeeding Olufemi Bamiro, a mechanical engineering professor and member of the Nigerian Academy of Engineering.

Between 1989 and 1992, he was an editorial adviser to the Nigerian Medical Journal and in 1997, he became a member of editorial board of the Nigerian Journal of Medicine. He is currently serving as a member of oncology clinical reviews. He is also a member of the editorial board of The Global Santé Journal. He has published over 180 scholarly articles and tens of books and has contributed to hundreds of other books as well.

=== Advocacy and medical politics ===
Adewole is a health advocator. He is a coordinator of the Campaign Against Unwanted Pregnancy, a multidisciplinary not-for-profit organisation consisting of medical practitioners, social scientists, nurses, and teachers. He organized a free cervical cancer screening campaign and was part of the team that introduced sexual rights into the curriculum of medical schools in Nigeria. He is involved in Nigerian medical politics. He was influenced by Dr. Kayode Obembe, the former president of the Nigerian Medical Association, who encouraged him in the early 1980s to contest the seat of secretary to the Resident Doctors Association. In 1982, Adewole was elected as the Secretary-general of the University of Ibadan Chapter of the Association of Resident Doctors. He served in that capacity for one year. In 1984 he was elected president of the National Association of Resident Doctors of Nigeria and led a nationwide strike that resulted in his dismissal by the then military head of state, General Muhammadu Buhari, who would later become the President of Nigeria. When Buhari declared him a wanted man, Adewole went into exile. He worked at the Cancer Campaign Research Institute in London, where he authored four papers. He later returned to Nigeria and was elected deputy Secretary-general of the Nigerian Medical Association in 1988. In 1990 he was elected Secretary-general of the Nigerian Medical Association. He held the position for two years, and in 1993, he was elected chairman of the Oyo State chapter of the Nigerian Medical Association. In March 1992 he was elected assistant secretary-general of the Confederation of African Medical Associations and Societies, and after his tenure ended in August 1997 he was elected secretary of the African regional task force on the control of gynaecological cancers.

== Keynote speeches ==
In addition to his outstanding contributions to medicine and academics, he is also a pundit. In his welcome address at a public lecture organised by the Consortium for Advanced Research Training in Africa held at the International Conference Centre, International Institute of Tropical Agriculture, Ibadan, he lamented the decline of Africa's contribution to global scientific output. He advocated for the commensurate expansion in doctoral training to meet the human resources needs of the new institutions as well as the existing ones.

In 2014, during the Ebola virus outbreak in Nigeria, he led a panel of experts to brainstorm on the latest scientific information on the nature of the virus, its signs, symptoms, and prevention. At a meeting held at the University of Ibadan to mobilise against the virus, he said "Nigeria is still safe, though we suffered a biological attack when Mr. Patrick Sawyer came into Nigeria from Liberia". He called on security agencies to investigate the bank accounts of Patrick Sawyer, who imported the virus into the country, to discover if he was paid to terrorise the country with the virus.

While receiving an award of excellence for outstanding contributions to obstetrics and gynaecology at the University of Sunderland 2015 convocation ceremonies, he said

any war against terror must be fought through collective efforts to nip it in the bud. An African proverb says 'Until you unmask it, a masquerade remains a terror'. A war against terror – of any kind – is best achieved through collective efforts. Our modest contributions from our corner of the globe have helped in restoring hope to millions of people without hope. It has become a lamp among the armament that unmasked the monster HIV, and we shall continue to beam the light of research on all threats to human existence.

As part of efforts to end insurgency in Nigeria, the Ambassador of France to Nigeria Jacques Champagne de Labriolle visited Adewole in his office at the University of Ibadan. Adewole described the ambassador's visit as "auspicious and timely in the history of Nigeria." He said "our country must gladly engage the French-speaking countries, if we really want to maintain security for the citizenry. I believe that creating a long-term security should be our main concern just as the initiative of our president was so strategic, having recently visited France."

== Ministerial nomination and appointment ==
On 12 October 2015, Adewole was nominated as minister of the Federal Republic of Nigeria by Muhammadu Buhari. The Academic Staff Union of Universities (ASUU) lauded his nomination and described him as a "round peg in a round hole suitable for president's change agenda". In his remarks, chairman of the union Professor Olusegun Ajiboye described the nomination as a "right step towards the change that Nigeria needs by appointing change agents who have achieved global recognition in their chosen academic career and have unblemished administrative records".

The Guardian reported that Dr. Ademola Aremu, the National Treasurer of the Union, said that

the story of Prof. Adewole 'IFA' as we popularly called him is the story of someone who has been destined to serve humanity. His achievements as a provost of the college of medicine made him to receive overwhelming support from the university community when he indicated interest to serve on the university governing council and later on as vice chancellor. As vice chancellor, he totally turned the university around in terms of staff and student welfare, academically, University of Ibadan unarguably became the best in Nigeria and one of the best in Africa.

In the same vein, the chairman of the University of Ibadan Senior Staff Association of Universities Wale Akinremi said "the nomination of Prof. Isaac Folorunsho Adewole as a minister was received by the university of Ibadan community with great enthusiasm. We can vouch for his professional pedigree and administrative competence."

On 11 November 2015, Adewole was appointed as minister of health in Buhari's administration. He called for stakeholders in the health sector to collaborate enable the ministry achieve Buhari's health agenda. According to The Nation, Adewole said

for the apex policy on health to be achieved, we need to work together and working together means we can make a huge difference. We have been described as a generation that enjoyed better health when we were young than now and our aim is to bring back the health care system we enjoyed when we were young.

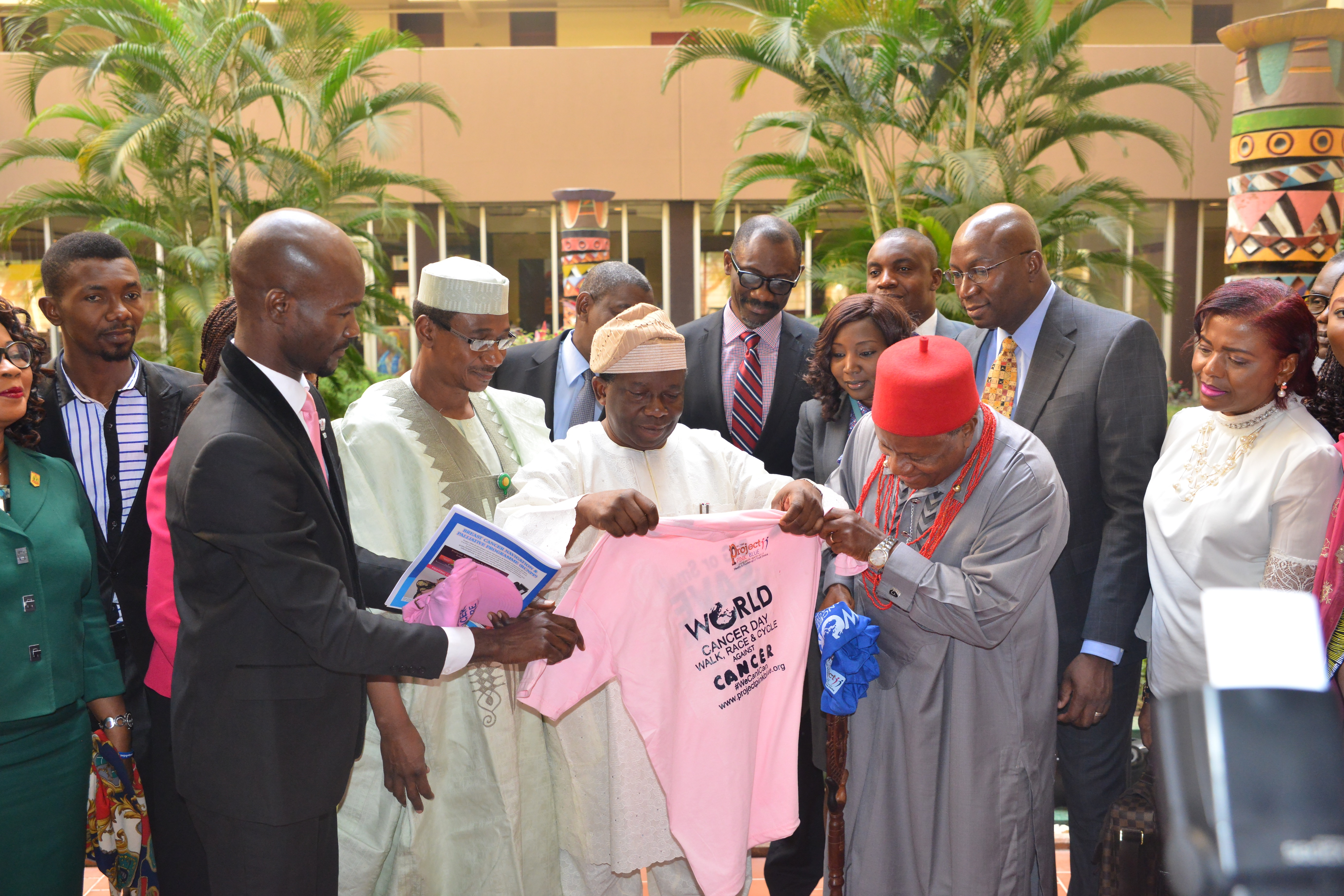
Adewole (center, holding the T-shirt) participating in World Cancer Day 2016

In his capacity as minister, Adewole was appointed by WHO Director-General Tedros Adhanom Ghebreyesus to serve on the Independent High-level Commission on Non-Communicable Diseases from 2018 until 2019. In addition, he is a member of the Family Planning 2020 (FP2020) Reference Group.

His tenure as minister of health ended in May 2019.

== Scientific contributions ==
Adewole is one of Nigeria's most prolific writers in the medical field. He has authored over 200 scholarly articles in learned journals and over 20 books in various areas of medicine. In 2005, he authored Prevention of Mother to Child Transmission of HIV in Nigeria; the book was published by the Harvard University Press. In April 2011, he made a presentation on the topic at Global Health Week at Northwestern University, Chicago. In 2007, he co-authored a training manual on sexual and reproductive health and rights and HIV prevention for medical students in Nigeria. The manual is currently being used in medical colleges in Nigerian universities.

He has attended over 100 scientific conferences in more than 20 countries and has presented posters and abstracts at numerous international conferences. For instance, at the International Conference on Retroviruses and Opportunistic Infections organised held in 2009 in Montreal, Adewole presented his abstract on "Mother's Prophylaxis Regimen Strongly Predicts Risk of Early Mother-to-Child Transmission in Large ART Program in Nigeria". In 2009, he attended the International Aids Conference held in South Africa, where he presented his abstract on the "Impact of Social Support in a PMTCT programme".

== Honours and recognition ==
Adewole has received several fellowship awards, such as the fellowship of the Nigerian Academy of Science, the National Postgraduate Medical College of Nigeria, and fellowship of the West African College of Surgeons. He is a member of several academic organisations such as the American Society of Clinical Oncology, International Agency for Research on Cancer, Nigerian Medical Association, International AIDS Society, International AIDS Society, International Society for Infectious Diseases, and the Society of Gynaecology and Obstetrics of Nigeria. In 2013, he became the only Nigerian professor appointed to serve as member of council of the Association of Commonwealth Universities. The association represents 535 universities from 37 Commonwealth countries. He was also appointed as a member of the international advisory board of the African Cancer Institute, a comprehensive cancer centre in sub-Saharan black Africa.

== Controversy ==
Adewole found himself at the center of controversy after he reportedly said that some doctors should become farmers. This drew significant backlash in a country with a low ratio of doctors per person.

== See also ==
- List of Vice-chancellors of Nigerian universities
