= Gbemisola Oke =

Nigerian professor of periodontology and community dentistry

Professor of Periodontology and Community Dentistry at University of Ibadan
- In office 2002–present

Deputy Vice Chancellor (academic) at University of Ibadan
- In office January 2015 – March 2017
- Preceded by: Abel Idowu Olayinka
- Succeeded by: Adeyinka Abideen Aderinto

Personal details
- Born: Gbemisola Aderemi Aderinokun
- Education: University of Ibadan (Bachelor of Dental Surgery); University of California (Master of Public Health (Health services)); University of Ibadan (Doctor of Philosophy in Community Medicine and Epidemiology)

Gbemisola Oke (born Gbemisola Aderemi Aderinokun) is a Nigerian professor of Periodontology and Community Dentistry at University of Ibadan. She was Deputy Vice Chancellor between 2015 and 2017. She has also occupied administrative positions such as Dean, Faculty of Dentistry and Director, Center for Entrepreneurship and Innovation at University of Ibadan.

== Early life and education ==
Oke had her first degree at University of Ibadan between 1976 and 1981. She then proceeded to United States to specialize in public health, obtaining a master's degree in Public Health in 1985. Afterwards, she returned to Nigeria to begin and complete her thesis in Epidemiology between 1987 and 1997. She is a member of many professional bodies including Nigerian Medical Association, Nigerian Dental Association, International Association of Dental Research, Society of Women and AIDS in Africa among others.

== Publications and administrative roles ==
Between 2007 and 2010, Oke was Dean, Faculty of Dentistry at University of Ibadan. Until her appointment as Deputy Vice Chancellor in 2015, she was Director, Centre for Entrepreneurship and Innovation. In January 2015, she was appointed deputy VC, replacing future Vice Chancellor, Abel Idowu Olayinka. She was the second woman to assume such position.

In 2015, she observed that tooth rotting is less rampart in Nigeria, comparatively to developed countries in that we are less dependent to sugary menus. She emphasized the need to use toothpaste containing fluoride as that will reduce the chance of a decay.

Speaking at one of the community dental center she established, Oke emphasized the need of more of its kind, while highlighting superstitious beliefs concerning oral health care and financial burden to keep cost affordable as a major drawback in the fulfillment of her set goals to redefine dental system in Nigeria.
