= Ilori (surname) =

- Gender: Male
- Language: Yoruba

Origin
- Origin: Nigeria
- Region of origin: South-West Nigeria

Ilori is a surname meaning "special treasure" in Yoruba. Notable people with the surname include:

- Samuel A. Ilori (born 1945), Nigerian mathematician
- Solomon Ilori (born c. 1934), Nigerian drummer and percussionist
- Tiago Ilori (born 1993), Portuguese footballer
- Yetunde Ilori, Nigerian businessperson
- Yinka Ilori (born 1987), British artist and designer
