= Cyprian C. Onyeji =

Nigerian academic (born 1957)

Prof. Cyprian Onyeji

Vice-Chancellor of Enugu State University of Science and Technology
- In office 2010–2015

Personal details
- Born: Cyprian Onyeji; 26 August 1957 (age 69) Jos, Northern Region, British Nigeria (now in Plateau State, Nigeria)
- Education: Obafemi Awolowo University; University of Connecticut
- Occupation: Academic; author
- Profession: Pharmacist

Cyprian O. Onyeji (born 26 August 1957) is a Nigerian academic, he is a professor of pharmaceutical chemistry and was the vice chancellor of Enugu State University of Science and Technology, Enugu from 2010 to 2015.

== Early life ==
Onyeji was born on August 26, 1957. He attended St. Theresa's College Nsukka where he earned his secondary school leaving certificate with Distinction in 1975 (West African School Certificate). He later attended University of Ife, now Obafemi Awolowo University (OAU) from 1976 to 1987 where he earned a B.Pharm. degree, MSc, and PhD degrees in Pharmaceutical Chemistry. He then went to the University of Connecticut for his post-doctoral and research associate program, from 1992 to 1994, 1997 – 1999.

== Career ==
After he received his PhD in 1987, he became a Lecturer I at OAU. He was later promoted to Senior Lecturer in 1991 and then Reader in 1995 before he became a professor in 1999.

Onyeji was at the Obafemi Awolowo University (OAU) Ile-Ife. Onyeji was the first H.O.D. Clinical Pharmacy, OAU Ile-Ife, and later was HOD of Pharmaceutical Chemistry Department followed by serving as Dean of Faculty of Pharmacy. He also served as the chairman for the Establishment Committee of the Governing Council of OAU Teaching Hospital, as well as serving as a member of Governing council of other establishments including Pharmacist Council of Nigeria, Pharmaceutical Society of Nigeria etc.

== Memberships ==
Onyeji is a member of Professional bodies including the American Society for Microbiology, International Society for Study of Xenobiotics and Nigerian Pharmaceutical Society. He is a Fellow of several Professional bodies as listed under "Recognition"

== Recognition ==
Outside the university, Prof Onyeji served as Governing Board member of different establishments. He has made excellent contributions to the advancement of Science through his studies with focus on pharmacokinetic, metabolism and pharmacodynamic evaluations of anti-infective drugs, with the overall objective of generating information relevant for optimization of therapeutic utility of the drugs. These studies, published in various high-impact journals, have provided the vital information on the need or otherwise for downward or upward dosage adjustment of the drugs when concurrently administered with other drugs. Some of his research findings are cited in National Drug Formularies including United States and British Pharmacopoeia, indication of relevance. In the course of his distinguished career, Professor Onyeji won several Prizes, national and international awards. For example, he is a recipient of Nigeria National Honors Award of Officer of Order of the Niger (OON). Prof Onyeji has also received numerous Fellowships such as FPSN, FNAPharm, FCAI, FASI, FASSONT.
