= Friday Okonofua =

Nigerian academic (born 1955)

Professor Friday Okonofua FWACS, FAS, FAAS, FMCOG
- Born: Friday Okonofua; 1955 (age 70–71); Ewu, Western Region, British Nigeria (now in Edo State, Nigeria)
- Education: Obafemi Awolowo University
- Occupations: Obstetrician; Gynecologist; Public health specialist; Academic; Educational administrator
- Years active: 1986–present
- Known for: Gynecology; Obstetrics; Public health female reproductive health Andrology

Friday Okonofua (born 1955) FAS is a Nigerian professor of Gynecology and Obstetrics. He is the pioneer Vice Chancellor of Ondo State University of Medical Sciences and founder of Women Health and Action Research Centre, a not-for-profit organization headquartered in Benin City, that focuses on promoting female reproductive research.

Prior to his appointment as the 1st substantive Vice Chancellor of Ondo State University of Medical Sciences, he served as the Provost of the College of Medical Science, University of Benin and currently the Program Officer of Ford Foundation's West Africa office. Ford Foundation is a New York headquartered, globally oriented private foundation with the mission of advancing human welfare. Professor Okonofua's research interest is in the area of Public health, sexual and female reproductive health as well as Andrology.

The results of his research on maternal mortality rate published by Business Day on Sunday, July 19, 2015 suggests that the mortality rate of a pregnant woman in Africa is 1 in 42 and 1 in 25, 500 in developed countries. Commenting on BusinessDay's Research and Intelligence Unit report published on June 2, 2015, he said “the major problem is that about 40% of doctors we train locally are going abroad because of better remuneration and better working environment. Also, there are less resources devoted to training doctors in the country, especially in public training institutions. What happens these days is that even when players in the private sector set up institutions to train doctors when members of the Nigerian Dental and Medical Association inspect such institutions, they are forced to approve it for very few students”. In recognition of his outstanding research and expertise in Gynecology and Obstetrics, he was appointed as executive director of the International Federation of Gynaecology and Obstetrics and was the only African Gynecologist and Obstetrician shortlisted for the interview held in London in April 2005.

In 2012, he was elected as fellow of the Nigerian Academy of Science, the apex scientific organization in Nigeria. He was inducted into the academy, alongside Professor Isaac Folorunso Adewole, the Vice Chancellor of the University of Ibadan and Professor Akinyinka Omigbodun, the President of the West African College of Surgeons and former Provost of the College of Medicine, University of Ibadan.

== Education ==
Okonofua attended the University of Ife, now Obafemi Awolowo University where he obtained a bachelor's degree in Health science and a Doctor of Medicine in 1978 from the same university. In 1981, he simultaneously enrolled at the National Postgraduate Medical College of Nigeria and the West African College of Surgeons. He became a fellow of the West African College of Surgeons in 1984 and a fellow of the National Postgraduate Medical College of Nigeria in 1985. Between 1984 and 1985, he was a Clinical Research Fellow at the Department of Chemical pathology of Royal Free Hospital, the teaching hospital of the University of London. Between 1991 and 1992, he was a Takemi Fellow in International health at School of Public Health, Harvard University. In 2004, he became a fellow of the International College of Surgeons. In 2005, he received a doctorate degree (Ph. D) in Public health and Population health from Karolinska Institutet, Sweden's third oldest medical school, after Uppsala University.

== Career ==
He began his career in 1978 at University of Benin Teaching Hospital as a rotating intern. He left the Teaching Hospital in 1979 for the compulsory one year youth service and was deployed to Ipokia District Hospital, Ogun State as a Medical Officer. He completed the service in 1980, the same year he became a Senior House Officer at the Department of Obstetrics and Gynecology of Obafemi Awolowo University Teaching Hospital. In 1983, he became a Senior Registrar in the same department and in 1984 he was promoted as Chief Resident before he became a Clinical Research Fellow in clinical endocrinology at the Royal Free Hospital, London.

In 2002, he was appointed as Provost, College of Medical Sciences and served in that capacity for 5 years. He served in several committees of the University as a member of senate and member of the University Governing board.

== Appointments ==
In 1991, he was appointed as Takemi research fellow in international health at the Harvard School of Public Health. In October 2009, he was appointed as Executive Director of International Federation of Gynecology and Obstetrics. In July 2006, as a result of his immense contributions to the field of medicine and public health, he was appointed to serve as Honorary Adviser to Chief Olusegun Obasanjo, the former President of Nigeria. He held the position till May 29, 2007 and during this period, he initiated the free maternal and child health policy adopted by the Federal Government of Nigeria and some States of Nigeria. He also initiated the deployments of midwives to rural communities across the six geopolitical zones during their compulsory one year National Youth Service in Nigeria. On May 1, 2010 he was appointed as Program Officer of Ford Foundation West Africa office in Lagos State and in 2012, he was appointed as Chairman of Ethical Review Board of the Nigerian Institute of Medical Research. He held the position till date. In June 2010, he contested the position of Vice Chancellor of the University of Ibadan and came second among the five shortlisted candidates. In 2014, he was appointed as the Team Leader of the University of Benin chapter of the West African Regional Centre of Excellence in Reproductive Health Research and Innovation (CERHI).

== Significant contributions ==
In 1993, he established the Women's Health and Action Research Center (WHARC), a not-for-profit organization based in Benin City to promote and conduct research and advocacy on women's reproductive health. Since its establishment in 1993, it has grown to become one of Nigeria's foremost Non-Governmental Organization. In 1999, he established the Owan Women Empowerment Project, a not-for-profit organization headquartered in Afuze, Edo State. The organization was handed to the local community in 2008, with a handover grant of $100,000 from the Ford Foundation. In 1997, he founded the African Journal of Reproductive Health, a Journal that was adjudged in 2005 as best Journal in Nigeria by the National University Commission. In 2002, he founded the Association of Private Obstetrical Providers of Nigeria (APOP) to promote women's health.

== Works ==
=== Selected Scholarly published articles ===
- Okonofua, F.; Houlder, S.; Bell, J.; Dandona, P. (1986). "Vitamin D nutrition in pregnant Nigerian women at term and their newborn infants". Journal of Clinical Pathology. 39 (6): 650–653. doi:10.1136/jcp.39.6.650.
- Okonofua FE. New reproductive technologies and infertility treatment in Africa. 2003; 7, 1, 7 – 8
- Okonofua FE et al. (2004). Knowledge, attitude and experiences of sex trafficking by young women in Benin City, South-south Nigeria. Social Science and Medicine September 2004, 59:6, 1315 – 1327.
- Okonofua FE (2004). Breaking the silence on prevention of unsafe abortion in Africa. African Journal of Reproductive Health. 8:1, 7 – 10.
- Okonofua FE (2005). Misoprostol and women's health in Africa. African Journal of Reproductive Health; 9:1, 1 – 5.
- Okonofua FE (2005). Achieving the millennium development goals in Africa: how realistic? Afr J Reprod Health. 2005 Dec; 9(3): 7 – 14.
- Okonofua FE. Rethinking contraception in Africa in the era of HIV/AIDS. Afr J Reprod Health. 2004 Aug; 8(2): 7 – 12.
- Okonofua FE. Abortion and maternal mortality in the developing world. Journal of Obstetrics and Gynecology Canada. 2006; 28:11, 974 – 979.
- Okonofua FE (2006). Female genital mutilation and reproductive health in Africa. African Journal of Reproductive Health; 10:2, 7 – 9.
- Okonofua FE, Iribhogbe P. Prevention of breast cancer in African women. Afr. J Reprod Health. 2006 Apr; 10(1):7 – 12.
- Okonofua FE (2007). Women's health: a continuing challenge in developing countries. Tropical Journal of Pharmaceutical Chemistry
- Okonofua FE (2007). HPV Vaccine and prevention of cervical cancer in Africa. Afr J of Reprod Health. 11, 2, 7 – 9.
- Okonofua FE (2007). New Research findings on Adolescent Reproductive Health in Africa. Afr J of Reprod Health; 11, 3, 7 – 9.
- Okonofua FE (2008). The contribution of antiabortion laws to maternal mortality in developing countries. Experts Reviews in Obstetrics and Gynecology. 3(2), 147 – 149.
- Okonofua FE. Maternal mortality prevention in Africa—the need to focus on access and quality of care. Afr J Rep Hlth 2009 Mar; 12(3): 9-16.
- Okonofua FE (2010). Preventing maternal mortality in Nigeria. An approach through policy research and capacity building. Afr J Repr Hlth; 14(3): 9-14
- Okonofua FE (2013). Prioritizing the Prevention of HIV/AIDS in African Women: A Call for Action. African Journal of Repr Health; 16, 3(Special edition) : 9-16)
- Okonofua FE and Ogu R. Traditional versus skilled birth attendants in provision of maternity care: Call for a paradigm shift. African Journal of Reproductive Health 2014 (March); 18 (1): 11-15.
- Okonofua FE. Revamping the reproductive health agenda in Africa after 2014. African Journal of Reproductive Health 2014 (June); 18 (2): 9-15.

=== Books and book chapters ===
- Okonofua FE, Odunsi K. Editors. Contemporary Obstetrics and Gynecology for Developing Countries Published by WHARC, 2005.
- Okonofua FE. Abortion. In: Contemporary Obstetrics and Gynecology for Developing Countries, Okonofua FE, Odunsi OA editors. Women's Health and Action Research Centre, 2005; 78-97
- Okonofua FE. The Health Sector. In Olusegun Obasanjo – The Presidential Legacy 1999-2007. Eds. Akinkugbe OO, Joda A, Ibidapo-Obe O, Okonofua FE, Idowu T. Publishers- Book Craft, 2013, pages218-257.
- Okonofua FE. Maternal health. In: MATERNAL HEALTH. Brief for Nigeria Health Review (NHR 2006). Health Reform Foundation (HERFON), 2006.
- Akinkugbe OO, Joda A, Ibidapo-Obe O, Okonofua FE, Idowu T. Editors. “Olusegun Obasanjo – The Presidential legacy 1999-2007”. Publishers: Book Craft, 2013.
- Okonofua FE. Infertility and sexual and reproductive health in Africa: In

“Reproductive Health Challenges in Africa: Textbook for Students and Development Practitioners” Ed: Friday Okonofua, Publishers: Adonis and Abbey, UK forthcoming April 2014.

=== Monographs and technical reports ===
- Okonofua FE, Ilumoka T: Prevention of morbidity and mortality from induced and unsafe abortion in Nigeria. Report of a seminar presented to the Population Council, New York. April 1992.
- Okonofua FE Current Perspectives and Experiences on Programming on Women's Sexual and Reproductive Rights in Nigeria. WHARC Occasional Working Paper Series 2002.

== See also ==
- List of Vice-Chancellors of Nigerian universities
