= Aderinto =

Aderinto is a surname. Notable people with the surname include:

- Adeyinka Abideen Aderinto, Nigerian sociologist
- Saheed Aderinto (born 1979), Nigerian American historian
