= Adeyinka Gladys Falusi =

Nigerian parasitologist

- Education: University of Ibadan; University College Hospital(PhD)
- Awards: L'Oréal-UNESCO Awards for Women in Science; Fellow of the Nigerian Academy of Science
- Scientific career
- Fields: Haematology; Molecular genetics Bioethics
- Workplaces: University of Ibadan
- Thesis: Alpha Thalassaemia in Nigerians (1986)
- Doctoral advisor: George Joseph Folayan Esan

Adeyinka Gladys Falusi, FAS NPOM, is a Nigerian Professor of haematology and former Director of the Institute for Advanced Medical Research and Training, College of Medicine, University of Ibadan.

She specializes in human genetics, bioethics and molecular genetics related to hereditary blood diseases such as sickle-cell disease and alpha-thalassemia.

== Early life and education ==
She hails from Ekiti State, southwestern Nigeria. she was brought up in Efon Alaaye in Ekiti State, Nigeria. Prof. Falusi was inspired to study science by an older girl (Grace Oladunni Olaniyan, now Prof. Taylor) who lived in their neighbourhood. She studied Chemistry at the University of Ibadan (UI). She proceeded to move from Chemistry to Haematology (blood study) at the College of Medicine, University College Hospital, Ibadan where she received her M.Phil in 1981 and PhD in 1986.

== Career ==
Professor Falusi conducts research on the genetics of Sickle Cell Disease. She is currently focused on awareness and education of the public on sickle cell disease. She is a co-founder of Sickle Cell Association of Nigeria (SCAN), as well as the founder and trustee of the Sickle Cell Hope Alive Foundation.

In 2001, she was appointed the Chairperson of the University of Ibadan and University College Hospital Institutional Review Committee where the first well-organized and functional Institutional Ethics Committee in Nigeria was established in the University of Ibadan under her leadership. In 2005, she became the coordinator for Nigeria Networking for Ethics of Biomedical Research in Africa.

== Honors and awards ==
Professor Falusi won the L'Oréal-UNESCO Awards for Women in Science in 2001 for her research in hereditary blood diseases. She served in that capacity for 4 years.

In 2005, she was bestowed with the National Productivity Order of Merit Fellowship. In 2009, she was elected as fellow of the Nigerian Academy of Science, the apex scientific organization in Nigeria. In 2013, she received the Ekiti State Merit Award and was decorated by Kayode Fayemi, the governor of Ekiti State. She was given the Access to Basic Care (ABC) Distinguished Personality Award for promoting the welfare of sickle cell patients globally and beyond the call of duty in 2014.

== Publications ==
She co-authored over 60 journal articles and book chapters, and over 80 conference articles and proceedings. She has researched and published in the genetics of some non-communicable diseases such as breast cancers, asthma, malaria and specifically the haemoglobinopathies of sickle cell disease and the thalassaemias and other genetic modifiers. Besides publications in sickle cell research, she also co-authored journal article and book chapter on ethics and research conduct.

== Family ==
She is married to Professor Abiodun Falusi, a Professor of Agricultural Economics with five children.

== See also ==
- Babalola Chinedum Peace
