= Falade =

Falade or Faladé is a surname. Falade is of Yoruba origin and derived from the Yoruba word "falode", which means "one who is wealthy or prosperous". Notable people with this surname include:

- Catherine Falade (born 1952), Nigerian healthcare manager, pharmacologist and academic
- Géraldine Faladé (1935–2025), Beninese-born French journalist and writer
- Solange Faladé (1925–2004), Beninese-born French doctor, anthropologist and psychoanalyst
