= Joseph Abiodun Balogun =

Nigerian-American academic (born 1955)

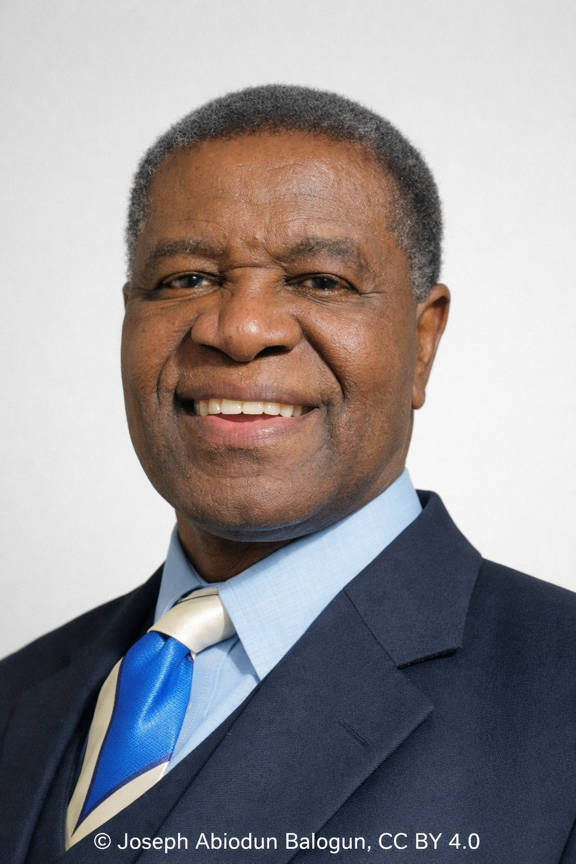
- Balogun in 2026
- Born: January 1, 1955 (age 71); Idofin, Northern Region, Nigeria (now in Kogi State, Nigeria)
- Education: University of Ibadan; University of Pittsburgh
- Occupations: Physical Therapist; Educator; University Administrator
- Years active: 1977–present
- Known for: Physical Therapy, Ergonomics, HIV Behavioral Research, Exercise Physiology, Allied Health, Public Health
- Spouse: Adetutu Balogun (m. 1989)

Joseph Abiodun Balogun, FAS, (born January 1, 1955) is a Nigerian-American academic. He is an emeritus professor of physical therapy (2025) and a distinguished university professor (2008) at Chicago State University (CSU), Illinois, USA. He served as Dean of the College of Health Sciences from 1999 to 2013, during which he developed eight new undergraduate and graduate academic programs and established the HIV/AIDS Research and Policy Institute to address the disproportionate incidence and complex burdens of HIV/AIDS among minority populations. Under his leadership, CSU emerged as a major contributor to diversifying the Illinois workforce by annually producing half of the state's African American nurses, occupational therapists, and health information managers with bachelor's degrees from public universities.

== Education ==
Balogun was born on January 1, 1955, in Idofin, in the Northern Region of Colonial Nigeria. He started his early western education at the Kabba Division Joint Education Council Primary School in Idofin and received his Primary School Certificate from the ECWA/SIM Primary School in Makutu, Kogi State, Nigeria. He graduated in 1972 from St. Kizito's College, a Catholic Secondary School (Ordinary level), in Itedo, and in 1973, completed his high school (Advanced level) education at Offa Grammar School. He obtained a Bachelor of Science (Honors) degree in physiotherapy in 1977 from Nigeria's University of Ibadan. Balogun immigrated to the US in 1980 and earned his master's degree in Orthopedic and Sports Physical Therapy (1981) and his Ph.D. in Exercise Physiology with a Minor in Research Methodology from the University of Pittsburgh in 1985. He became a naturalized American citizen in 1998.

== Career ==
Balogun began his career as a physiotherapist in 1978 at Mubi General Hospital, where he was deployed for the mandatory one-year National Youth Service and established the first Physiotherapy Department in the defunct Gongola State. He joined the Kwara State Civil Service as a Basic Physiotherapist in 1979 and worked at the General Hospital in Ilorin until 1980, when he left for his postgraduate education in the USA. Balogun has held faculty, visiting, and administrative positions at Russell Sage College; Obafemi Awolowo University (OAU), Ile-Ife; University of Florida, Gainesville; Texas Woman's University, Houston; State University of New York Health Science Center at Brooklyn (SUNY-HSCB); Barry University, Florida; and King Saud University, Saudi Arabia. He served for six years as Chairman of the Physical Therapy Program (1993–1999) and Associate Dean for Student Academic Affairs (1994–1999) at SUNY-HSCB. He also served as Consultant Physiotherapist (1988–1991), and Vice-Dean in the Faculty of Health Sciences at OAU (1990–1991); Emeritus Professor of Physiotherapy and Associate Director of Research, Development, and Innovation at the University of Medical Sciences, Ondo City, Nigeria (2017–2022); Visiting Professor and Program Consultant at the Center of Excellence in Reproductive Health Innovation, University of Benin, Nigeria (2017–2023); and Consultant and Advisory Board Member at the Women's Health and Action Research Centre, Benin City, Nigeria (2017–2023).

Part of Balogun's academic work has focused on the historical evolution, organization, and reform of health systems, with particular emphasis on Nigeria. In November 2023, he was among the experts invited by the Social Policy Research Center at the University of Bremen in Germany to participate in a workshop examining the historical development of health care systems in Kenya and Nigeria in the contexts of nation-building and postcolonial governance. As part of this engagement, Balogun authored The Health Care System in Nigeria, published as No. 36 in the CRC 1342 "Social Policy Country Briefs" series. The monograph provides a historically grounded analysis of Nigeria's health care system from the colonial period to the present, including an overview of key health indicators and the broader sociopolitical context. It examines the organizational structure, coverage, provision, financing, and regulation of health services over time; traces major policy initiatives and reforms such as the Walker-Harkness Plan, the Basic Health Services Scheme, the development of primary health care, and the National Health Insurance Scheme; and discusses coexisting traditional and orthodox systems of care, as well as the role of global and national actors in shaping policy. The publication situates Nigeria's health care system within the "Global Dynamics of Social Policy" framework, highlighting persistent systemic challenges, uneven progress toward universal health coverage, and the implications of political instability and governance for health outcomes.

Balogun's publications have appeared in journals of physical therapy, ergonomics, and HIV behavioral research. His edited volumes have been published by the world's most respected academic presses, including Springer Nature, Palgrave Macmillan, Routledge (Taylor & Francis), and Lexington Books (Rowman & Littlefield). Balogun is recognized as the first scholar in physical therapy to publish a comprehensive three-volume series, Contemporary and Global Perspectives in Physical Therapy, documenting the profession's global development, emerging trends, and projected directions. The publication was followed by Primer of Epidemiologic Physical Therapy: Essential Concepts for Evidence-Informed Practice, which functions as a conceptual companion to the earlier series. The Primer examines the application of epidemiologic principles to physical therapy and explores their relationship to global practice patterns, workforce development, and the expanding role of physical therapists in population health. Together, the two works provide an integrated framework for understanding clinical practice, population-level reasoning, and evidence-informed decision-making within the field.

A prolific scholar, Balogun has authored 12 academic textbooks, 7 book chapters, 9 monographs and autobiographies, 26 conference abstracts, and 235 full manuscripts in peer-reviewed books and journals. Among his top research collaborators is Friday Okonofua, former pioneering Vice-Chancellor of the University of Medical Sciences, Ondo. Balogun's scholarship is distinguished by its analytical coherence and its focus on the structural, professional, and policy determinants that shape healthcare delivery. In Health Professions in Nigeria: An Interdisciplinary Analysis (2021), Balogun examines the development of the Nigerian health workforce, highlighting interprofessional tensions, regulatory constraints, and sociopolitical forces that shape professional identity. He argues that workforce fragmentation undermines service efficiency and patient outcomes, and proposes an interdisciplinary, team-based model as a pathway to strengthening healthcare performance. His earlier volume, Healthcare Education in Nigeria: Evolutions and Emerging Paradigms (2020), extends this systems-level analysis to the preparation and training of health professionals.

Balogun's collaborative work with Philip Aka broadens the scope of his contributions to include the intersections of health policy, economics, and governance. In Healthcare and Economic Restructuring: Nigeria in Comparative Perspective (2022), the authors contend that the country's health-system challenges are inseparable from broader macroeconomic constraints, and that sustainable reform requires structural changes in national revenue generation and financing. Their subsequent collaboration, Improving Disability Laws under Nigeria's Fourth Republic: Ten Measured Steps into the Future (2022), examines the gap between disability legislation and its implementation and advocates for a rights-based framework that situates disability inclusion within national development priorities.

Balogun's Health Research in Nigeria: A Bibliometric Analysis (2023) provides the first comprehensive assessment of the research productivity and scientific impact of Nigerian health scholars, including those in the diaspora. Through thematic mapping, author profiling, and institutional comparison, the study identifies systemic barriers, including limited funding, inadequate mentorship, and insufficient research infrastructure. The work offers evidence-informed recommendations to strengthen national research capacity and enhance Nigeria's global scientific visibility.

His scholarship on education culminates in Reimagining Nigeria's Educational System: Improving Academic Performance Through High-Stakes Standardized Testing (2023). In this volume, Balogun challenges the assumption that standardized testing is responsible for the decline in educational outcomes in Nigeria. Instead, he attributes the decline to systemic governance failures, inadequate funding, and weak accountability structures. Drawing on comparative analyses of six high-performing global education systems, he outlines strategies for strengthening assessment and accountability frameworks. The book has been noted for its scholarly and policy relevance in reviews published in the African Studies Review and the African Journal of Reproductive Health.

Balogun's work has contributed to the development of discourse and practice in health science education internationally. In 2015, he delivered the third Christopher Ajao keynote speech at the 55th Annual Conference of the Nigeria Society of Physiotherapy. In 2017, he delivered the second Distinguished University Guest Lecture at the University of Medical Sciences in Ondo City, Nigeria. In 2021, he gave the inaugural keynote address at the International Association of Nigerian Physical Therapists Conference, further solidifying his influence in the field.

Balogun has also served as Deputy Editor-in-Chief of the African Journal of Reproductive Health (2019–2025); Editorial Board Member of the International Journal of Physiotherapy Theory and Practice (1999–2025) and the Journal of the Nigeria Society of Physiotherapy (2018–2024). He currently serves on the Editorial Boards of the Kanem Journal of Medical Sciences and the International University of Sarajevo Law Journal.

Balogun is a Fellow of the Carnegie African Diaspora Program (FCADP), the Academy of Medicine Specialties of Nigeria (FAcadMedS), the Institute of Management Consultants of Nigeria (FIMC), Fellow of the Royal Society for Public Health (FRSPH), Fellow of the Nigerian Academy of Science (FAS), Fellow of the Nigeria Society of Physiotherapy (FNSP), and Fellow of the American College of Sports Medicine (FACSM). Balogun is the first physical therapist to receive the FAS award. In 2003, he was awarded the J. Warren Perry Distinguished Author Award by the Journal of Allied Health.

== Personal life ==
Balogun is married to Dr. Adetutu Olusola Balogun (née Olotu), an occupational therapist and entrepreneur from Tinley Park, Illinois. They have four children.
