= Adebola (name) =

Given name

- Gender: Unisex
- Language: Yoruba

Origin
- Origin: Nigerian
- Meaning: Crown met Wealth
- Region of origin: South-West Nigeria

Pronunciation of name

Adébọ́lá is a Nigerian given unisex name of Yoruba origin, which means "Crown met wealth". It diminutive form form includes "Débọ́lá", "Débọ̀" and "Bọ́lá"(though Bola can be a deminitive form of names like "Ajíbọ́lá" or "Towọ́bọlá".

== Notable people with the name ==
- Dele Adebola
- Adebola Williams
- Adebola Babatunde
- Adebola Adeyeye
