= Sunny Edet Ohia =

Pharmacology professor

Sunny Edet Ohia is a professor of Pharmacology at Texas Southern University. He is a fellow of the Nigerian Academy of Science, elected into the academy's Fellowship at its Annual General Meeting held in January 2015.
