= Uche Veronica Amazigo =

Professor of Medical Parasitology and Public health Specialist

Uche Veronica Amazigo is a professor of Medical Parasitology and public health specialist. She is a fellow of the Nigerian Academy of Science who was elected into the Academy's Fellowship at its Annual General Meeting held in January 2015. In 2012, she won the Prince Mahidol Award for outstanding contributions to public health. She is best known for her research on onchocerciasis and her consequent contributions to the World Health Organization (WHO).

== Background ==
Uche Veronica Amazigo (née Onubogu) is a biologist, who is trained in public health, parasitology and specializes in tropical diseases. She is from Enugu, Nigeria. She went to the University of Vienna in Austria, where she received her Ph.D. in Biology and Medical Parasitology. She also holds a Diploma in Tropical Medicine and Parasitology from the Bernhard-Nocht Institute of Tropical Medicine in Hamburg, Germany and Fellowship in International Health from the Harvard T.H. Chan School of Public Health. She also was awarded an honorary Doctor of Science degree from the University of KwaZulu-Natal in South Africa in 2013.

== Career ==
In her early career, Amazigo was a senior lecturer at the University of Nigeria in Nsukka, where she taught medical parasitology and public health. It was during this period in the late 1970s that she began studying onchocerciasis (river blindness) after encountering the disease during her travels around the area. She joined a rural women's support group in order to better study the social effects that the disease had on rural communities. She then applied for and received a research grant from the United Nations’ Special Programme for Research and Training in Tropical Diseases (TDR) in order to continue her research into river blindness. She then worked for the TDR for several years, where she developed a program for training community workers to treat themselves and others, and keep record books of the treatments. She brought her findings to the WHO, where her studies were replicated. The results from this replication resulted in the founding of the African Programme for Onchocerciasis Control (APOC) in 1995. Amazigo joined the APOC as a scientist in 1996. Her work with the APOC built upon her work with the TDR, and resulted in the development of Community-Directed Treatment with Ivermectin (CDTI), with ivermectin being the drug that treats onchocerciasis. It is estimated that her CDTI strategy has resulted in the treatment of over 112.4 million people for onchocerciasis, 11 million people for malaria control, and 37 million people for the control of other diseases. Amazigo spent four years as the Chief of the WHO's sustainable drug distribution unit from 2001–2005. She served as the director of the APOC from 2005 until 2011. During this period, she engaged 16 African governments, 14 international non-governmental organizations (NGOs), 20 bilateral and multi-lateral donors, and pharmaceutical companies. After retiring from the APOC, she founded the Pan-African Community Initiative on Education and Health (PACIEH) in 2013.

== Awards and fellowship ==
While serving as a WHO Officer, she received the distinction of being named a Knight of the National Order of Burkina Faso. She was also recognized by the US Agency for International Development and the National Medical Research Institute of Tanzania and received the Dr Jean Mayer Global Citizenship Award from Tufts University. Also, with her as Director, the APOC was awarded the 1 million Euro António Champalimaud Vision Award in 2011, which is the biggest global award for outstanding contributions to the prevention of visual impairment and blindness. She was a member of multiple organizations such as the Board of Trustees of Sightsavers, the TY Danjuma Foundation, Advisory Board of Massachusetts General Hospital Center for Global Health, and Merck's Global Advisory Board on Maternal Mortality.

- Fellow, Nigerian Academy of Science
- Fellow, Harvard T.H. Chan School of Public Health
- Fellow, Parasitology and Public Health Society of Nigeria

== Selected published works ==
Amazigo has more than 55 publications in international peer-reviewed journals.

Amazigo, U. (October 1993). "Onchocerciasis and women's reproductive health: indigenous and biomedical concepts". Tropical Doctor. 23 (4): 149–151. doi:10.1177/004947559302300404. ISSN 0049-4755. PMID 8273155. S2CID 38022678.

Amazigo, Uche; Okeibunor, Joseph; Matovu, Victoria; Zouré, Honorat; Bump, Jesse; Seketeli, Azodoga (2007). "Performance of predictors: Evaluating sustainability in community-directed treatment projects of the African programme for onchocerciasis control". Social Science & Medicine. 64 (10): 2070–2082. doi:10.1016/j.socscimed.2007.01.018. PMID 17383061.
