= Oluwatoyin A. Odeku =

Nigerian professor of pharmaceutics

Oluwatoyin Adepeju Odeku
- Born: Oluwatoyin Adepeju Odeku; Nigeria
- Education: Obafemi Awolowo University; University of Ibadan; University of Benin
- Known for: Drug formulation and delivery systems; mentoring women in science
- Awards: Nature Awards for Mentoring in Science (2024); Humboldt Alumni Award (2021); May & Baker Professional Service Award (2024)
- Scientific career
- Fields: Pharmaceutics, Pharmaceutical technology
- Workplaces: University of Ibadan

Oluwatoyin Adepeju Odeku is a Nigerian professor of pharmaceutics and pharmaceutical technology, academic administrator, and mentor. She is affiliated with the University of Ibadan, where she served as Dean of the Faculty of Pharmacy. She is known for her research in drug formulation and delivery systems, as well as her contributions to mentoring women in science.

== Early life and education ==
Odeku obtained a Bachelor of Pharmacy (B.Pharm.) from the University of Ife which is now known as Obafemi Awolowo University, Ile-Ife, Nigeria. She later earned her Master of Science (M.Sc.), 1992 and a Doctor of Philosophy (PhD) degrees from the University of Ibadan, Nigeria.

She also holds a Doctor of Pharmacy (PharmD) degree from the University of Benin and has received training in higher education management in Germany.

Professor Odeku did her postdoctoral studies at the Hebrew University, Jerusalem, Israel.

== Academic career ==
Odeku began her academic career at the University of Ibadan in 1993, as an Assistant Lecturer. She rose to the rank of professor in 2008. A Professor of Pharmaceutics and Pharmaceutical Technology. She became a Fellow of The African Academy of Science (ASS) in 2022.

She has held several leadership roles, including, Dean, Faculty of Pharmacy, Director, Office of International Programs, Head of Department (Acting) and Sub-Dean (Undergraduate).

=== Activities ===
During the 97th Annual National Conference of the Pharmaceutical Society of Nigeria (PSN), that took place at Uyo, Akwa Ibom, state from 4–9 November, Professor Odeku received an award of 2024 edition of the prestigious May & Baker Professional Service Award in Pharmacy. These cash value for the Award was N1m. While receiving the award, Professor Oluwatoyin stated, “I count it a great honour to be the recipient of the 2024 May and Baker professional service award. I am grateful to God and my family for their support. I appreciate May and Baker for consistently recognising contributions to the profession of pharmacy over the years. I wish May and Baker continuous success."

In 2019, the Pharmacists Council of Nigeria (PCN) met in Kaduna to discuss about Nigeria and drug abuse. Professor Odeku was there and spoke on a topic tilted: Curbing the menace of drug abuse through information, education and communication. In her speech, she said, “drug abuse kills. Drug abuse truncates future. Children please don’t be involved in drug abuse... it changes your brain chemistry. It takes control of your brain because it has affected the brain, some will become repressive or depressive. They look unkept. They engage in strange behaviour."

on Thursday, 02 October, 2014, Professor Odeku delivered her inaugural lecture at the University of Ibadan. The title was, "Development of indigenous pharmaceutical excipients: Myth or reality."

Her research focuses on pharmaceutics, drug delivery systems, polymer science, and pharmaceutical technology. It also includes excipient development, tablets, starch, controlled release. Others are Clinical Pharmacy and Pharmacy Practice.

She has also held visiting and research positions in Germany, Israel, and Ghana.

== Research and publications ==
Antimicrobial activity of Ficus exasperata (Vahl) leaf extract in clinical isolates and its development into herbal tablet dosage form by Odeku, Oluwatoyin, A. (2020).

Comparative quality assessment of selected fluconazole brands in Ibadan, Nigeria: Évaluation comparative de la qualité de certaines marques de fluconazole à Ibadan, au Nigéria.

Forgotten Gems: Exploring the Untapped Benefits of Underutilized Legumes in Agriculture, Nutrition, and Environmental Sustainability. In: Plants.

Impact of PharmD training on pharmacy practice among graduates of non-traditional PharmD degree programme in Nigeria.

Odeku’s research interests include drug formulation and delivery systems, pharmaceutical excipients and polymers, and anti-diabetic drug development.

She has contributed to academic publications on pharmaceutical formulation and has co-authored studies on plant-based anti-diabetic treatments.

She has also contributed as an editor to scholarly works on healthcare issues in Sub-Saharan Africa.

== Mentorship and advocacy ==
Odeku founded the Women in Academic Advancement Network (WAAN) in 2018, a mentoring initiative aimed at improving research productivity and career development among female academics.

Her mentorship work addresses challenges faced by women in science, including work–life balance and institutional barriers.

== Awards and recognition ==
Odeku has received several awards, including:

- Nature Awards for Mentoring in Science (West Africa, 2024)
- May & Baker Professional Service Award in Pharmacy (2024)
- Humboldt Alumni Award for Innovative Networking Initiatives (2021)
- George Forster Research Fellow at the Martin Luther 2006.

She is a Fellow of the Nigerian Academy of Science, the Pharmaceutical Society of Nigeria, and the Nigerian Academy of Pharmacy.

== Professional affiliations ==
Odeku is a member of several scientific organizations, including the Science Association of Nigeria and the African Academy of Sciences.

She is a member of the Organization for Women in Science the Development World (OWSD). She is also a member of the Pharmacists Council of Nigeria and Pharmaceutical Society of Nigeria.

She also serves as a Humboldt Ambassador Scientist for Nigeria.

== Personal life ==
Odeku is married with children and has spoken about the importance of family support in enabling women to pursue academic careers.
