= Grace Gbotosho =

Nigerian pharmacologist

- Born: Grace Olusola Omitowo
- Occupation: Pathologist
- Awards: Fellow of the African Academy of Sciences (2019); Fellow of the Nigerian Academy of Science (2020)

Academic background
- Education: University of Ife; University of Ibadan

Academic work
- Discipline: Pharmacology
- Sub-discipline: Antimalarial medication
- Institutions: University of Ibadan

Grace Olusola Gbotosho (née Omitowo) is a Nigerian pharmacologist who specialises in the pharmacodynamics and pharmacokinetics of antimalarial medication. She is a senior lecturer at the University of Ibadan College of Medicine's Department of Pharmacology and Therapeutics.

== Biography ==
Grace Olusola Gbotosho (née Omitowo), was educated at the University of Ife (where she got a bachelor's degree in pharmacology with honours in 1985) and University of Ibadan (where she got a MSc in Pharmacology in 1991 and a PhD in Pharmacology and Therapeutics in 2000) and at the UCL School of Pharmacy. In April 1995, she joined the University of Ibadan academic staff as a lecturer, before being promoted to senior lecturer in October 1999. She currently works at the University's Department of Pharmacology and Therapeutics.

As a researcher, she specialises in the pharmacodynamics and pharmacokinetics of antimalarial medication. She is an editorial board member at the African Journal of Biomedical Sciences, African Journal of Medicine and Medical Sciences, and Journal of Public Health and Epidemiology. She is a member of the Pharmaceutical Society of Nigeria and the American Society of Tropical Medicine and Hygiene. She has had several temporary advisor appointments with the World Health Organization.

In February 2023, during a lecture at the University of Ibadan, Gbotosho warned that the therapeutic efficacy of artemisinin-based combination therapies was deteriorating in children infected with malaria, especially artemether/lumefantrine, and voiced support for improvements to antimalarial treatment, particularly the creation of an "African Malaria School" and the removal of chloroquine from antimalarial drug rotation.

She was elected as a Fellow of the African Academy of Sciences in 2019 and as a Fellow of the Nigerian Academy of Science in 2020.
