= Emmanuel Ndubisi Maduagwu =

Professor and Head of the Department of Biochemistry

- Born: Emmanuel; 1947 (age 78–79)
- Citizenship: Nigeria
- Education: University of Ibadan
- Occupations: chemist, academic
- Awards: Fellow of the Nigerian Academy of Science

Emmanuel Ndubisi Maduagwu (born 1947) was promoted to the rank of Professor in the department of biochemistry by the University of Ibadan in 1989 and he served the university in that capacity until December 2013. He was Professor of Biochemistry on contract at Covenant University. He is a Fellow of the Nigerian Academy of Science and was elected into the academy's Fellowship at its Annual General Meeting held in January 2015. Professor is a Consultant in the area of food safety and food toxicology. Professor Maduagwu is currently Professor and Head of Department of Biochemistry at Chrisland University in Abeokuta, Nigeria.

== Education ==
Maduagwu attended Dennis Memorial Grammar School, Onitsha, Anambra State, Nigeria where he obtained the Cambridge West African School Certificate in 1962 and the Cambridge Higher School Certificate in 1964. He received his bachelor and doctorate degrees in biochemistry from the University of Ibadan in 1972 and 1976 respectively. He joined the department of biochemistry, college of medicine, University of Ibadan, as a lecturer grade II in 1978 and was appointed a senior lecturer in 1981. In 1989, he became a full professor of biochemistry in the same university. He retired from the services of the University of Ibadan in 2012, having attained the mandatory retirement age of 65 years.

== Fellowship ==
- Royal Society of Chemistry
- Nigerian Academy of Science
- Nigerian Institute of Biology
- Malawian Society of Food and Chemical Safety
- Nigerian Society of Food and chemical Toxicology
