= Jarlath Udoudo Umoh =

Nigerian Professor of Veterinary Medicine

Jarlath Udoudo Umoh is a professor of Veterinary medicine at Ahmadu Bello University. He is a fellow of the Nigerian Academy of Science, elected into the Academy's Fellowship at its Annual General Meeting held in January 2015. He was 11th (Acting Vice Chancellor) of Ahmadu Bello University from May 2009 to December 2009. He is a scientist who through his study on the dissemination of rabies virus in tissues, developed the use of skin biopsy for in vitro diagnosis of rabies in 1983.

== Family and early life ==
Umoh hails from Ikot Ekpene Local Government Area of Akwa Ibom State. He is married to Prof. Veronica Umoh and they have five children.

== Education ==
Umoh obtained his West African School Certificate (Division I, 1964) from St. Columbanus Secondary School, Ikwen, Ikot Ekpene. He acquired the Cambridge Higher School Certificate in 1966 from St. Patrick's College, Calabar. Ahmadu Bello University awarded Umoh Doctor of Veterinary Medicine (DVM) in 1974. He obtained Master of Science in Public Health (MSPH,1977) and Doctor of Philosophy (Ph.D. 1980) from the University of Missouri.

== Career ==
Umoh worked in Sokoto Veterinary Centre under the National Youth Service Corps (NYSC) scheme after graduation with DVM in 1974. He later joined the services of Ahmadu Bello University in August 1975 as an assistant lecturer in the Department of Veterinary Public Health and Preventive Medicine and rose through the ranks to become a professor in 1989. Umoh was involved in the administration both at the Faculty and University levels while at Ahmadu Bello University, Zaria. Some of those positions of responsibility he held includes: Head, Department of Veterinary Public Health and Preventive Medicine 1984-1986, 1989-1996 and 2000-2004; Deputy Dean 1991-1992; Dean of Faculty of Veterinary Medicine 1993-1998; Dean of Postgraduate School 2004-2007; Deputy Vice-Chancellor (Academic) 2007-2009; Acting Vice-Chancellor, May 2009 to December 2009.

He has taught several public health and preventive medicine courses at both undergraduate and postgraduate levels. He has supervised over 113 postgraduate students and authored or co-authored over 260 publications in peer-reviewed journals.

Umoh has served as an external examiner for undergraduate and postgraduate programmes, to University of Nigeria, Nsukka, University of Maiduguri, University of Ibadan, Usmanu Dan Fodiyo University, Nnamdi Azikiwe University, University of Abuja and Michael Okpara University of Agriculture, Umudike.

He spent one of his sabbatical leaves teaching in the College of Veterinary Medicine, University of Agriculture, Makurdi from April 2010 to March 2011. He was a visiting professor to the Faculty of the Veterinary Medicine University of Abuja and the Michael Okpara University of Agriculture, Umudike.

== Awards and fellowship ==
Umoh won eight prizes as an undergraduate student at Ahmadu Bello University and the Beecham – Phi Zeta Research Award as a postgraduate student at the University of Missouri. He is a Fellow Alexander VON Humboldt Foundation, a Fellow of College of Veterinary Surgeons, Nigeria (FCVSN) and a Fellow Nigerian Academy of Science.

He has worked especially on the epidemiology of rabies. He was the Principal Investigator in the MacArthur Foundation funded project for the creation of Centre of Excellence in Veterinary Epidemiology in Ahmadu Bello University. He was a member of WHO Expert Committee on Rabies 1991- 2003 and has served on many national and international committees concerned with animal disease control.

He was the Head of the Public Health and Preventive Medicine Speciality Group of the College of Veterinary Surgeons, Nigeria (2007 – 2012). He is currently the Provost, College of Veterinary Surgeons, Nigeria. His research interest is in Epidemiology of Zoonoses in general but particularly Viral Zoonoses.

The Nigerian Academy of Sciences on 14 May 2015 at Reiz continental hotel, Abuja added to its membership by inducting nine distinguished scientists as Fellows of the Nigerian Academy of Science. Among whom was Umoh for studying the dissemination of rabies virus in tissues (Umoh and Blenden, 1982 Int. J. Zoonoses 9:1-11). He developed the use of skin biopsy for in vitro diagnosis of rabies (Blenden et al 1983 J. Clin Microbiol 18:631-636).
