= Abel Idowu Olayinka =

Nigerian Professor of Applied geophysics (born 1958)

Professor Abel Idowu Olayinka FNAS
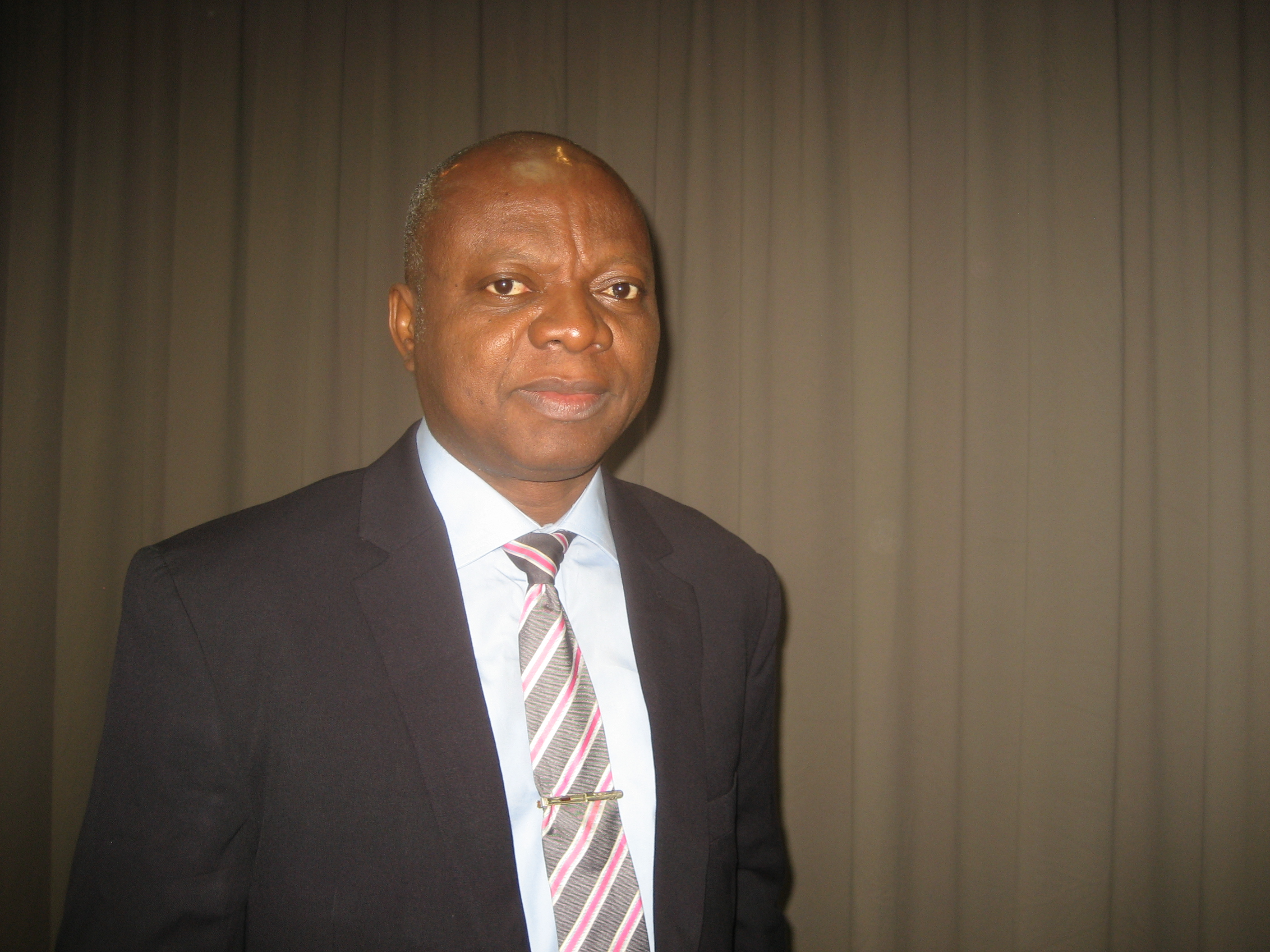
- Olayinka (2016)
- Born: 16 February 1958 (age 68); Osun State, Nigeria
- Education: University of Ibadan
- Occupations: Geologist Academics; Educational administrator
- Years active: 1977 - present
- Known for: Geology
- Successor: Adebola Babatunde Ekanola
- Spouse: Dr. Eyiwumi Bolutito Olayinka

Abel Idowu Olayinka FNAS (born 16 February 1958) is a Nigerian professor of applied geophysics. He is a former deputy vice chancellor and former vice chancellor of the University of Ibadan. He is also the president of the West African Research and Innovation Management Association.

In 2012, he was elected as a fellow of the Nigerian Academy of Science, the apex academic organization in Nigeria. He was inducted into the academy, along with Professor Isaac Folorunso Adewole, the 11th substantive Vice Chancellor of the University of Ibadan, Professor Mojeed Olayide Abass, a Nigerian professor of computer science at the University of Lagos and Professor Akinyinka Omigbodun, the president of the West African College of Surgeons and former provost of the College of Medicine, University of Ibadan.

In September 2015, he was appointed as the 12th substantive vice chancellor of the University of Ibadan to succeed Professor Isaac Folorunso Adewole, a Nigerian professor of gynecology and obstetrics whose tenure ended on 30 November 2015. Olayinka completed his tenure as vice-chancellor of the University of Ibadan on 30 November 2020 and was succeeded by Professor Adebola Babatunde Ekanola, who took over in acting capacity. In 2013, while serving as deputy vice chancellor of the University of Ibadan, he was considered for the position of vice chancellor of the Osun State University, but he declined the appointment. In a publication by The Nation Newspaper, Professor Isaac Folorunso Adewole described Olayinka as the luckiest among the 13 contestants. He said, "Anybody who is privileged to be the VC is not the best, the brightest and the most intelligent; such a person is just the luckiest among the best."

== Education ==
Olayinka was born on 16 February 1958, at Odo-Ijesha, a town in Osun State, southwestern Nigeria. He had his elementary education at Bartholomew's Primary School at Odo-Ijesa and Ilesa Grammar School, where he obtained the WASC in 1975. He received a bachelor's degree in Geology from the University of Ibadan.

Following the completion of the compulsory one year Youth Service at the Hydrogeology and Hydrology Department of the Federal Ministry of Water Resources, Port Harcourt in 1982, he worked briefly at Deptol Consultants as geologist before he proceeded to the University of London. There he received a master's degree in geophysics in 1984, the same year he received a Membership Diploma of Imperial College in July 1984 before he bagged a scholarship award that earned him a doctoral degree in applied geophysics from the University of Birmingham.

In April 1997, he was a postdoctoral research fellow at TU Braunschweig and in July 1997, he was Alexander von Humboldt Research Fellow at Technische Universität Berlin. Since his appointment as professor, he has supervised hundreds of undergraduate students, 66 master's degree students and 9 doctoral degree students. He has published over 50 scholarly articles in reputable academic journals, as well as books and monographs.

== Career ==
=== University of Ibadan ===
He began his academic career on 20 April 1988 as lecturer II at the University of Ibadan. He was promoted to lecturer grade I in 1991, and in 1994, he rose to the position of a senior lecturer. On 1 October 1999, he became a professor of applied geophysics. Having served as sub-dean of the Faculty of science between 1 August 1995 and 31 July 1997, he was appointed as sub-dean, postgraduate school. He held the position till 31 July 2001 and was immediately appointed as head of Geology department. In August 2002, he was appointed Dean of the postgraduate school, a position he held till July 2006, the same year he was reappointed as head of the department of Geology. In February 2007, he was appointed chairman, Senate Curriculum Committee. He held the position till July 2010. Prior to his appointment as the 12th substantive vice chancellor of the University of Ibadan, he served as deputy vice chancellor of the University between December 2010 to December 2014.

=== Editorial appointment ===
In 1994, he was appointed as member of the editorial board, Nigerian Journal of Science, a position he served for 6 years. He also served as associate editor, Journal of Mining and Geology, between 1994 and 2004. In 2000, he was appointed as deputy editor-in-chief of the journal, serving in this capacity till date. In 2001, he was appointed as associate editor of Global Journal of Pure and Applied Sciences. In 2008, he was appointed as editor-in-chief of the Nigerian Association of Petroleum Explorationists (NAPE), an editorial position he held till 2010. Between March 2006 and March 2012, he was member of the Council of the Nigerian Mining and Geosciences Society and was chairman of the awards committee of the society between 2007 and 2012. He is a peer reviewer of European Journal of Environmental and Engineering Geophysics/Near-Surface Geophysics.

== Memberships and fellowships ==
=== Membership ===
- Member, Nigerian Association of Hydrogeologists (NAH).
- Member, Science Association of Nigeria (SAN)
- Member, Nigerian Association of Petroleum Explorationists (NAPE).
- Member, West African Research and Innovation Management Association (WARIMA)
- Member, Environmental and Engineering *Member, Geophysical Society (EEGS), Denver, Colorado, US.
- Member, Society of Exploration Geophysicists (SEG), Tulsa, Oklahoma, US.
- Member, Society of Research Administrators International (SRAI).
- Member, Nigerian Mining and Geosciences Society (NMGS)
- Member, African Network for the Internationalization of Education (ANIE)
- Member, European Association of Geoscientists and Engineers (EAGE)

=== Fellowship ===
- Fellow of the Nigerian Association of Petroleum Explorationists (2013)
- Fellow of the Nigerian Academy of Science (2012)
- Chartered Geologist, Geological Society of London (2012)
- Fellow of the European Federation of Geologists (2012)
- Fellow of the Nigerian Mining and Geosciences Society (2012)
- Fellow of the Geological Society of London (2004)

== Selected works ==
- Oladunjoye, M. A., Olayinka, A. I., Alaba, M., & Adabanija, M. A. (2016). Interpretation of high resolution aeromagnetic data for lineaments study and occurrence of Banded Iron Formation in Ogbomoso area, Southwestern Nigeria.
- Osinowo, O. O., & Olayinka, A. I. (2013). Aeromagnetic mapping of basement topography around the Ijebu-Ode geological transition zone, Southwestern Nigeria.
- Olayinka, A., & Osinowo, O. (2009, March). Integrated Geophysical and Satellite Imagery Mapping for Groundwater Assement ina a Geological Transition Zone in Southwestern Nigeria.
- Osinowo, O. O., Alumona, K., & Olayinka, A. I. (2020). Analyses of high resolution aeromagnetic data for structural and porphyry mineral deposit mapping of the Nigerian younger granite ring complexes, North-Central Nigeria.
- Osinowo, O. O., Fashola, O. E., Ayolabi, E., & Olayinka, A. I. (2019). Structural Mapping and Gold Mineralization Potential Evaluation from Airborne Time-Domain Electromagnetic (tdem) Data of Ilesha Schist Belt, Southwestern Nigeria.
- Okpoli, C. C., & Ola, A. I. (2017). Estimation and characterization production using Dar-Zarrouk crystalline basement terrain.
- Osinowo, O. O., Oladunjoye, M. A., & Olayinka, A. I. (2015). Overpressure Prediction from Seismic Data and Implications on Drilling Safety in the Niger Delta, Southern Nigeria. Petroleum Technology Development Journal, 5, 13-26.

== See also ==
- List of Vice-Chancellors of Nigerian universities
