= Chinedum Babalola =

Nigerian pharmacist and academic

Professor Chinedum Peace Babalola FAAS, FAS
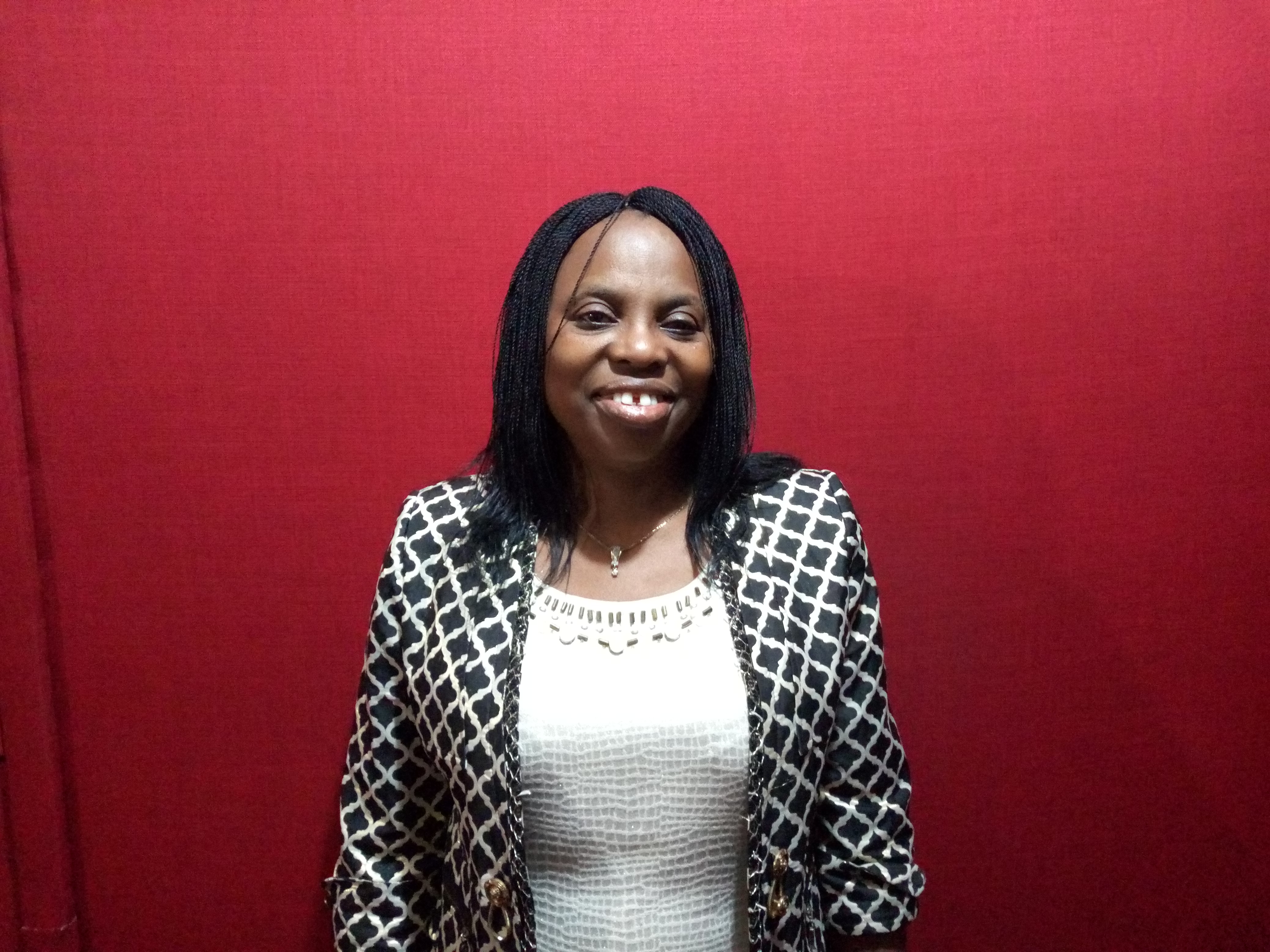
- Born: Chinedum Peace Anyabuike
- Education: Obafemi Awolowo University, Ile Ife
- Occupations: Pharmacist; Educational administrator
- Years active: 1980–present
- Known for: Pharmacy; Pharmacokinetics; Pharmacodynamics; PK/PD
- Spouse: Collins Olufemi Babalola (1988-present)
- Children: 3

Chinedum Peace Babalola (née Anyabuike) FAS, FAAS is a Nigerian Professor of Pharmaceutical Chemistry and Pharmacokinetics. She teaches pharmacy at the University of Ibadan, FAS, and FAAS and served as vice-chancellor of Chrisland University from 2017 to 2024.

== Background ==
=== Education ===
Babalola obtained a Bachelor of Pharmacy (B.Pharm.) degree in 1983, Master of Science in Pharmaceutical Chemistry in 1987 and a Doctor of Philosophy in Pharmaceutical Chemistry (Pharmacokinetics option) in 1997 from the University of Ife, now Obafemi Awolowo University. She won the World Bank/NUC scholarship for staff training and completed her pre-doctoral fellowship at the University of British Columbia between 1994 and 1995.

In 2012, Babalola earned a postgraduate Diploma in Industrial Pharmacy Advanced training (IPAT) jointly issued by Kilimanjaro School of Pharmacy, Tanzania and Purdue University, USA.

=== Career ===
Babalola started her academic career as a Junior Trainee/Graduate Assistant in the Obafemi Awolowo University in 1985. In 1994, she moved to the University of British Columbia to complete a pre-doctoral fellowship. She rose to Lecturer I in the Department of Pharmaceutical Chemistry Obafemi Awolowo University before joining the University of Ibadan as a Senior Lecturer in 1998. Babalola became the University of Ibadan's first female Professor of Pharmacy in October 2006.

Since 2002, she has been an adjunct Researcher at the Institute of Advanced Medical Research and Training (IAMRAT) under Genetic & Bioethics Research Unit; College of Medicine, University of Ibadan. A unit she also headed from 2010 to 2012.

Before her appointment as the Vice Chancellor of Chrisland University, she served as the first female Dean of the Faculty of Pharmacy University of Ibadan (2013–2017), and as an adjunct Professor in the Department of Pharmaceutical Chemistry, Faculty of Pharmacy, Olabisi Onabanjo University. She was a two-term Director of General Studies (2005–2010) University of Ibadan. She is the first pharmacist to be appointed as a specialist adviser and consultant in a Nigerian hospital—University College Hospital (UCH), Ibadan. From 2018 to 2019, she spent thirteen months as Doctor of Pharmacy at the University of Benin. In 2024 she completed her role as the Principal Investigator, on the USAID sponsored USP PQM+ project on promoting Quality of Medicines in LMIC in CDDDP, UI core-flex (a cooperative agreement - $160M Global).

From 2017 to 2024, Babalola was vice-chancellor of Chrisland University, Abeokuta in Ogun State.

Since she became a professor, she has supervised hundreds of undergraduate students and over 30 postgraduate students (PGD, MSc, M.Phil. & PhD). She has over 150 scholarly articles in academic journals as well as books, book chapters, conference abstracts and monographs.

In 2024, her h-index was 22.

== Academic contributions ==
Babalola's research has been focused on ethics of human research, pharmacogenetics, clinical trials, drug interaction PK/PD, and non-communicable diseases (Sickle cell disease and cancer). She developed a High-performance liquid chromatography method for the analysis of quinine in biometrics. This method for quinine analysis led to the elucidation of the pharmacokinetics of quinine. Her feasibility studies on drug interactions and metabolism suggest a decrease in bio-availability and bacterial activity of certain antibiotics when combined with some anti-malaria drugs.

Her report on the use of proguanil suggested that some Nigerians are carriers of mutant CYP2C19 genes and poor drug metabolizers.

== Fellowship and membership ==
Babalola is a recipient of several fellowships and a member of many professional bodies:

- Fellow, Nigeria Academy of Pharmacy (NAPharm), 2015
- Fellow, African Academy of Science, 2012
- Fellow, Pharmaceutical Society of Nigeria (F PSN), 2012
- Member, Institute of Public Analyst of Nigeria (MIPAN)

== Awards and honors ==
- African Union Kwame Nkrumah Award for Scientific Excellence (Regional) at African Union Addis Ababa, Ethiopia ($20,000), 2019.
- In 2011, she won the MacArthur Foundation Grant worth $950,000 (2012) for Higher Education Higher Education, with which she set up of the Centre for Drug Discovery Development and Production (CDDDP), in the University of Ibadan.
- In 2022, she was named the best Vice Chancellor in Ogun State for the year 2022 by the Gateway News.

== Select publications ==
Below are selected peer-reviewed scholarly publications by Professor Chinedum.

- Adehin A, Igbinoba SI, Soyinka JO, Onyeji CO, Babalola CP (2019) "Pharmacokinetics of quinine in healthy Nigerian subjects and in patients with uncomplicated malaria: analysis of data using a population approach" Current Therapeutics Research 91, 33–38
- Oluwasanu MM, Atara N, Balogun W, Awolude O, Kotila O, Aniagwu T, Adejumo P, Oyedele OO, Ogun M, Arinola G, Babalola CP, Olopade CS, Olopade OI and Ojengbede O (2019) Causes and remedies for low research productivity among postgraduate scholars and early career researchers on non-communicable diseases in Nigeria. BMC Research Notes 12:403, 2019 doi:10.1186/s13104-019-4458-y
- Nwogu JN, Babalola CP, Ngene SO, Taiwo BO, Berzins B, Gandhi M (2019) Willingness to Donate Hair Samples for Research Among People Living with HIV/AIDS Attending a Tertiary Health Facility in Ibadan, Nigeria. Aids Research and Human Retroviruses 35 (7) Published Online: 26 June 2019 doi:10.1089/aid.2018.0242
- Kotila OA, Fawole OI, Olopade OI, Ayede AI, Falusi AG, Babalola CP (2019) N-acetyltransferase 2 enzyme genotype–phenotype discordances in both HIV-negative and HIV-positive Nigerians Pharmacogenetics and Genomics, 29 (5), 106–113, 2019 DOI:doi:10.1097/FPC.0000000000000373
- Adejumo OE, Kotila TR, Falusi AG, Silva BO, Nwogu JN, Fasinu PS, Babalola CP (2016) Phenotyping and genotyping of CYP2C19 using comparative metabolism of proguanil in sickle-cell disease patients and healthy controls in Nigeria. Pharmacology Research & Perspectives, 4(5): e00252. doi:10.1002/prp2.252
- Ong CT; et al. (2005). Penetration, intracellular accumulation and efflux of tigecycline in human polymorphonuclear neutrophils (PMNs). Journal of Antimicrobial Chemotherapy 56:498-501.
- Babalola CP; et al. (2013) Toxicological Effect of SubTherapeutic, Therapeutic and Overdose regimens of Halofantrine Hydrochloride on Male Albino Rats. Pharmacologia 4 (3): 180–185, 2013
- Babalola, CP.; et al. (2010). Cytochrome P450 CYP2C19 genotypes in sickle cell disease patients and normal controls. Journal of Clinical Pharmacy and Therapeutics. 35:471-477
- Babalola CP; et al. (2009) Effect of fluconazole on the pharmacokinetics of halofantrine in healthy volunteers. Journal of Clinical Pharmacy and Therapeutics. 34:677-682
- Maglio D et al. (2005). Pharmacodynamic profile of ertapenem against Klebsiella pneumoniae and Escherichia coli in a murine thigh model. Journal of Antimicrobial Agents and Chemotherapy 49(1):276-280.
- Babalola CP; et al. (2002). Effect of proguanil interaction on bioavailability of cloxacillin. Journal of Clinical Pharmacy and Therapeutics, 27: 461–464
- Babalola CP; et al. (2004) Synergistic activity of vancomycin and teicoplanin alone and in combination with streptomycin against Enterococci faecalis with various vancomycin susceptibilities. International Journal of Antimicrobial Agents 23: 343–348
- Babalola CP; et al. (2004). Comparative bioavailability study of a new quinine suppository and oral quinine in healthy volunteers. Tropical Journal of Pharmaceutical Research. 3(1): 291–297
- Babalola CP; et al. (2004) Adjunctive efficacy of G-CSF on treatment of Pseudomonas aeruginosa pneumonia in neutropenic and non-neutropenic hosts. Journal of Antimicrobial Chemotherapy 53(6):1098-1100.
- Babalola CP; et al. (2004) Bioavailability and bioequivalence (BA/BE) assessment. Towards Better Quality Assurance of Drugs in the 3rd ..., 2004 Pg 79
- Babalola CP; et al. (2006) Analysis of the antimalarial drug halofantrine and its major metabolite N-desbutyl halofantrine in human plasma by high performance liquid chromatography- Journal of pharmaceutical and biomedical analysis, 2006 Cited by 10 Related articles All 6 versions
- Babalola CP; et al. (2012) Herbal clinical trials - historical development and application in the 21st Century- Pharmacologia, 2012 cited by 10 related articles
- Babalola CP; et al. (2003) Liquid chromatographic determination of pyronaridine in human plasma and oral dosage form- Journal of Chromatography B, cited by 16 related articles all 6 versions
- Babalola CP; et al. (2011) Medical Herbalism and Herbal Clinical Research: A Global Perspective.
- Babalola CP; et al. (2002) Polymorphic oxidative metabolism of proguanil in a Nigerian population - European Journal of Clinical Pharmacology, cited by 19 related articles all 9 versions
- Babalola CP; et al. (2011) Evaluation of prescription pattern in Osun state (Southwest) Nigeria - Journal of Public Health and Epidemiology, cited by 39 related articles all 4 version

== Personal life ==
Babalola is a devout Christian and is married to Bishop Collins Olufemi Babalola. They have three children.
