= Adeyinka Afolayan =

Nigerian professor

- Occupation: Professor

Academic work
- Discipline: Biochemistry
- Institutions: Nigerian Academy of Science

Adeyinka Afolayan is a Nigerian Professor of Biochemistry and fellow of the Nigerian Academy of Science, elected into the Academy's Fellowship at its annual general meeting held in 2006.
