= Isaac Adebayo Adeyemi =

Nigerian academic

Isaac Adebayo Adeyemi is a Nigerian Professor of Food science and fellow of the Nigerian Academy of Science, elected into the academy's Fellowship at its annual general meeting held in 2012. He was the Vice chancellor of Bells University of Technology, a privately owned University located in Ota, Ogun State Southwestern Nigeria.

== Background ==
He obtained a bachelor's degree in Agricultural Biochemistry and Nutrition, from the University of Ibadan in 1972 and doctorate degree in Food science from the University of Leeds, United Kingdom in 1978. He began his career in 1973 at the Department of Human Nutrition of the University of Ibadan. He later joined the services of Obafemi Awolowo University as a Lecturer II in 1978 and rose to the position of Reader in 1990 In 1991, he was transferred to Ladoke Akintola University of Technology, where he was appointed a professor of Food science. In August 2006, he was appointed as Vice-Chancellor of Bells University of Technology, a position he held till date.

== See also ==
- Bells University of Technology
