= Kehinde Oluwatoyin Ladipo =

Kehinde Oluwatoyin Ladipo is a Nigerian geologist. He is a fellow of the Nigerian Academy of Science, elected into the Academy's Fellowship at its Annual General Meeting held in January 2015.

== Biography ==
Ladipo spent over fifteen years working at Shell Nigeria. After retiring from Shell, Ladipo helped set up a postgraduate school of geoscience at the University of Benin.
