= Kayode Adebowale =

Nigerian chemist (born 1962)

Kayode Adebowale FRSC

13th vice-chancellor of the University of Ibadan
- Incumbent
- Assumed office 14 October 2021
- Preceded by: Abel Olayinka

Deputy Vice-Chancellor of the University of Ibadan
- In office June 2018 – October 2021
- Preceded by: Emilolorun Ambrose Aiyelari

Personal details
- Born: Kayode Oyebode Esuoso; 11 January 1962 (age 64)
- Education: University of Ibadan (B.Sc); University of Ibadan (M.Sc); University of Ibadan (PhD)
- Profession: Industrial Chemist
- Website: sci.ui.edu.ng/content/koadebowale

Kayode Oyebode Adebowale FRSC (born 11 January 1962) is a Nigerian professor, scientist and the 13th vice-chancellor of the University of Ibadan. In October 2021, he became the vice-chancellor of the University of Ibadan, having formerly served as the deputy vice-chancellor (administration) of the University of Ibadan, and as the dean of the faculty of science in same institution.

== Early childhood and education ==
Prof Kayode Adebowale was born on 11 January 1962 and he is a native of the Gateway state, Ogun in Western Nigeria. He had his primary education at St. Marks Primary School, Oke-Ijaga, Ijebu Igbo between 1967 and 1972 while his secondary was at Ayedaade Grammar School, Ikire between 1973 and 1978. He earned his BSc in chemistry in 1984 from the University of Ibadan at the age of 22. He received his master's degree and PhD from the same university in 1986 and 1991 respectively. He began his academic career as a graduate assistant from the University of Ibadan and became a professor of industrial chemistry in 2006.

== Academic life ==
He was once a lecturer at Federal University of Technology. He was formerly the deputy vice-chancellor (administration), University of Ibadan. Prof Adebowale, MNI, FRSC, FAS, FAvH, FCSN, FSAN, FPIN is the 13th vice chancellor of the University of Ibadan.

On Thursday, 14 October 2021, the Council Chairman and Pro-Chancellor of the university, Chief Dr. John Odigie-Oyegun, announced the appointment of Professor Kayode Adebowale as the 13th vice-chancellor of the university.
