= Akinyinka Omigbodun =

Professor Akinyinka Omigbodun
- Born: Osun State, Nigeria
- Education: University of Ibadan
- Occupations: Obstetrician; Gynecologist; Academics; Educational administrator
- Years active: 1980–present
- Known for: Gynecology; Obstetrics; Gynecologic oncology

Akinyinka Omigbodun is a Nigerian professor of gynecology and obstetrics and a former provost of the College of Medicine, University of Ibadan. He once served as president of the West African College of Surgeons and chair of the management board of the Consortium for Advanced Research Training in Africa (CARTA).

His research interest is in the area of gynecologic oncology. He is a member of the governing council, Osun State University, appointed in 2012 by Ogbeni Rauf Aregbesola, the past executive governor (between 2010 and 2018) of Osun State. He was a keynote speaker at a media roundtable held in Lagos, where he also presented his report on the Needs Assessment Survey for Ekiti and Nasarawa State. The survey aimed to assist in developing plans to address social development and reproductive health issues of Nigerian youths.

== Background ==
Akinyinka Omigbodun was born in Osun State, Southwestern Nigeria. He obtained a bachelor's degree (M.B.B. S) in medicine with distinction from the College of Medicine, University of Ibadan, in June 1980. Shortly after completing a compulsory one-year youth service in Nigeria, he began his residency training in obstetrics and gynecology in 1982. Having completed the training in 1987, he became a fellow of the West African College of Surgeons.

== Career ==
In October 1997, he was appointed professor of obstetrics and gynaecology at the University of Ibadan. In 2002, he became the chief coordinator of courses at the West African College of Surgeons.

In 2012, he was elected as a fellow of the Nigerian Academy of Science, the apex academic organization in Nigeria. He was inducted into the academy alongside Professor Mojeed Olayide Abass, a Nigerian professor of computer science at the University of Lagos, and Professor Isaac Folorunso Adewole, who was once vice chancellor of the University of Ibadan.

== Awards and honours ==
Professor Akinyinka Omigbodun has received numerous awards and prizes for outstanding contributions to medicine and academics. He received the Audrey Meyer Mars Clinical Oncology Fellowship as well as the Fellowship of the American Cancer Society. In November 1996, he was awarded the American Society for Reproductive Medicine prize for outstanding scientific contributions for the best poster presentation at the 52nd annual conference held in Boston, Massachusetts, USA.

== Membership ==
- Member, Medical and Dental Council of Nigeria (2006-2010)
- Member Education Committee, Medical and Dental Council of Nigeria (2006-2010)
- Member Medical and Dental Practitioners’ Disciplinary Tribunal, Medical and Dental Council of Nigeria (2006-2010)
- Member, Governing Council, University of Ibadan (2006-2010)
- Member, Finance and Management Committee, University College Hospital, Ibadan (2006-2010)
- Member Board of Management, University College Hospital (UCH), Ibadan (2006-2010)
- Member Board of Management, Osun State University Teaching Hospital, Osogbo
- Member, International Agency for Cancer Research HPV Prevalence Surveys Study Group (1999-2011).
- Member, Governing Council, Osun State University (2012 until date).

== Selected scholarly articles ==
- Omigbodun, AO; et al. "Cervical intraepithelial neoplasia in a sexually transmitted diseases' clinic population in Nigeria". J. Obstet. Gynaecol. East Cent. Afr. 1988 (7): 74–77.
- Omigbodun, AO; et al. (1989). "Choice of intravenous fluid infusion in labour and maternal postpartum blood pressure". Trop. Geogr. Med. 1989 (41): 227–229. PMID 2595800.
- Omigbodun, AO; et al. "Maintaining standards in practice through medical audit". Niger. Med. J. 1989 (19): 195–199.
- Omigbodun, AO; et al. (1990). "Efficacy of ceftazidime in the treatment of acute pelvic infections". Niger Med. Pract. 20 (4): 77–78.
- Omigbodun, AO; et al. (1991). "Management of cervical intraepithelial neoplasia where colposcopy is not available". Cent. Afr. J. Med. 1991 (37): 7–11. PMID 2060008.
- Omigbodun AO and Akanmu TI. Clinicopathologic correlates of disease stage in Nigerian cervical cancer patients J. Obstet. Gynaecol. East. Cent. Afr., 1991, 9:79-82.
- Omigbodun, AO; et al. "Effects of using either saline or glucose as a vehicle for infusion in labour East". East. Afr. Med. J. 1991 (68): 88–92.
- Omigbodun, AO; et al. "Organisation of maternity care services in developing countries". Dokita Journal of Medicine. 1991 (21): 51–54.
- Omigbodun, AO; et al. (1992). "Invasive cervical carcinoma in two sisters". West Afr. J. Med. 1992 (11): 158–161. PMID 1390378.
- Omigbodun, AO; et al. (1992). "Ultrasonography as an adjunct to hydrotubation in the management of female infertility". Cent. Afr. J. Med. 1992 (38): 345–350. PMID 1486618.
- Omigbodun, AO; et al. "Effects of saline and glucose infusions of oxytocin on neonatal bilirubin levels". Int. J. Gynecol. Obstet. 1993 (40): 235–239.
- Omigbodun, AO; et al. (1993). "Triage of patients with abnormal smears in the absence of colposcopy". Trop. Geogr. Med. 45: 157–158.
