= Women Health and Action Research Centre =

- Founded: Benin City, Edo State, Nigeria; 1993
- Type: charitable organization
- Purpose: Female reproductive health Maternal health and advocacy
- Location: KM II Benin – Lagos Expressway, Igue-Iheya, Ugbowo, Benin City, Nigeria.
- Region served: Worldwide
- Website: Official website

The Women Health and Action Research Centre is a Nigerian non-profit and charitable organization based in Benin City, Edo State that promote reproductive health through research and advocacy. The organization was founded in 1993 by Professor Friday Okonofua as a means to provide sustainable solutions to female reproductive related problems.

The Women Health and Action Research Centre relies on public contributions and grants to fund its mission. The continued research growth and development of the organization is dependent mostly on donations but the organization also increased its revenue by alternative means of funding such as grants and sponsorships. In 2009, MacArthur Foundation awarded a research grant of $250,000 to the organization in support of research to improve policies and programs for promoting maternal health in six states of Nigeria. Between 2002 and 2015, the Women Health and Action Research Centre had received a grant of $550,000 from the MacArthur Foundation.
