= Yetunde Mercy Olumide =

Nigerian professor and academic

- Born: September 21, 1943 (age 82)
- Citizenship: Nigerian
- Occupation: Academic
- Title: Emeritus Professor

Academic work
- Discipline: Medicine

Yetunde Mercy Olumide (born September 21, 1943, in Jos, Plateau State) is the first female Emeritus Professor of Medicine at the University of Lagos, Nigeria. Mercy is also a Dermatologist, and consultant physician and a Venereologist, educator.

== Career ==
Mercy was the former Dean of the Faculty of Medicine, University of Lagos. She was awarded the title of emeritus professor by the University of Lagos in 2013.

In 2000, she was appointed Fellow of the Nigerian Academy of Science.

== Books ==
- Textbook of Skin Disease and Sexually Transmitted Infections
- The Vanishing Black African Woman: Volume One
- The Vanishing Black African Woman: Volume Two
