= Adebola Babatunde Ekanola =

Acting vice chancellor of University of Ibadan

Professor Adebola Babatunde Ekanola
- Born: 2 December 1969 (age 56); Oyo State, Nigeria
- Education: University of Ibadan
- Occupations: Philosopher Academics; Educational administrator
- Years active: 1987 - present
- Known for: Philosophy
- Spouse: Yetunde Aderemi Ekanola

Adebola Babatunde Ekanola (born 2 December 1969) is a Nigerian professor of philosophy whose research area is ethics, social and political philosophy with special interest on issues relating to peace and social development in Africa. He is a former acting head of the department of philosophy, former dean of Faculty of Arts, and former director of the Office of International Programmes in the University of Ibadan. Ekanola was appointed acting vice-chancellor the University of Ibadan in November 2020. He is the national coordinator of the Network of Directors of Internationalization in Nigerian Universities (NODINU).

== Acting vice chancellor at University of Ibadan ==
On 30 November 2020, he was appointed, by the University Council on the recommendation of the University Senate, as the acting vice-chancellor of the University of Ibadan to succeed Professor Abel Idowu Olayinka, a Nigerian professor of applied geophysics whose tenure ended on 30 November 2020. Ekanola was reelected to the position in May 2021.
