= David Okpako =

Nigerian pharmacologist

David Okpako (22 November 1936 – 7 September 2020) was a Nigerian pharmacology professor, pharmacist, founder of the faculty of pharmacy at the University of Ibadan, and a former founding president of the Nigeria Institute of Biology.

== Early life and education ==
David Okpako was born in Delta State, Nigeria, on 22 November 1936. He obtained his primary school leaving certificate from the Owahwa local government area of Delta State. He obtained his secondary leaving certificate from the Baptist High School Port Harcourt, later joining the Nigerian College of Arts, Science and Technology, Ibadan where he got his first degree in pharmacy and became a registered pharmacist in 1960. He earned his PhD in pharmacology in 1967 and a post-doctoral MRC fellowship from University College in London.

== Career ==
Okpako started his career at the University of Lagos as a lecturer in the College of Medicine after he returned to Nigeria in 1968. In 1969, he joined the University of Ibadan, where he became a head of the department of pharmacology from 1978 to 1981, the founder/coordinator of faculty of pharmacy in 1983, and Dean of the faculty of pharmacy in 1987. He was appointed as a fellow at the Nigerian Academy of Science in 1991, a visiting professor at the University of the Western Cape Town in South Africa from 1983 to 1984, he was also a visiting fellow at Fitzwilliam College, Cambridge from 1995 to 1996. From 1997 to 1998, he served as president of the West African Society for Pharmacology, and between 1994 and 2000, he served as founding president of Nigeria Institute of Biology. He was the author of five books, including Principal of Pharmacology, Tropical Approach (1991), and Science Interrogating Belief.

== Death ==
David Okpako died on 7 September 2020 in Ibadan, Oyo, Nigeria, at the age of 83.
