= James Ogbonna =

Nigerian biotechnologist

James Chukwuma Ogbonna
- Citizenship: Nigeria
- Education: University of jos
- Occupation: Lecturer

Prof James Chukwuma Ogbonna is a Nigerian academic. He is the current and pioneer Vice-chancellor of State University of Medical and Applied Sciences in Enugu State. He was Deputy Vice Chancellor Academics at the University of Nigeria under Benjamin Chukwuma Ozumba from 2014 to 2019. He is currently the Vice Chancellor of State University of Medical and Applied Sciences Egbeno Enugu State.

He holds a Bachelor of Science from the University of Jos, a master's degree from University of Yamanashi and a PhD from University of Tsukuba. In February 2021, the Japanese Ambassador to Nigeria, Mr. Kikuta Yutaka awarded him and others in honor of their contribution to the Japan-Nigerian bilateral relations and cross-cultural advancement.

He currently has 183 publications on ResearchGate.
