= Mark Nwagwu =

Nigerian poet and academic

Professor Mark Nwagwu FNAS
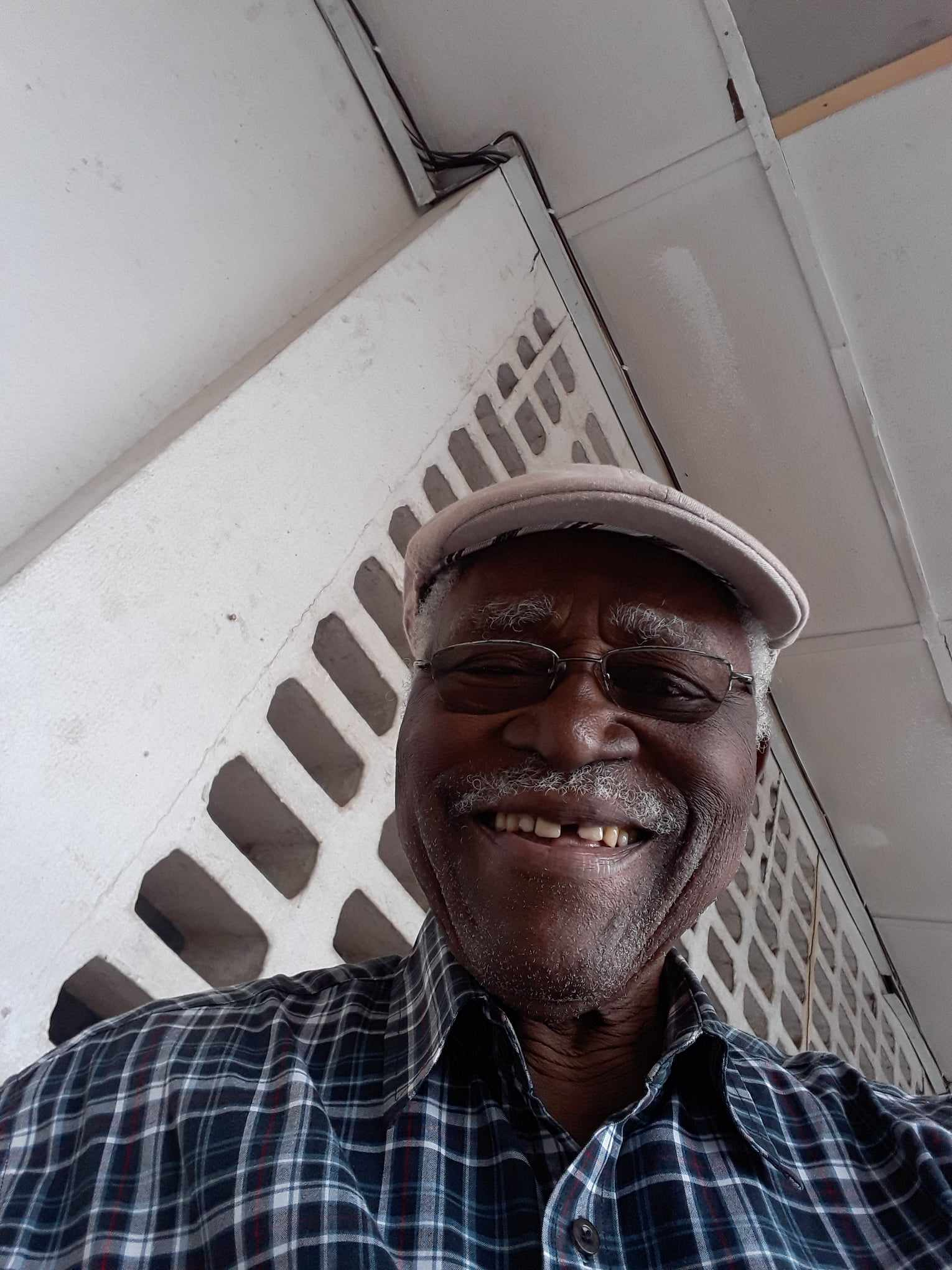
- Born: 5 May 1937 (age 89); Nguru, Aboh Mbaise, Imo State
- Citizenship: Nigerian
- Education: University of Ibadan
- Occupations: Lecturer, poet
- Spouse: Helen Nwagwu (m. 1962; died 2018)
- Children: 4
- Writing career
- Language: Igbo
- Notable awards: Fellow Nigerian Academy of Science

Mark Nwagwu is a Nigerian poet, columnist and professor of cell molecular biology at the University of Ibadan. His work has appeared on Vanguard, The Punch, ThisDay and Premium Times.

== Early life and career ==
Nwagwu was born in Oboetiti, Nguru Aboh Mbaise, in Imo State. He attended Christ the King School, Aba, between 1942 and 1949, before proceeding to St. Patrick's College, Calabar, to study between 1950 and 1956.

He received his B.Sc. and M.Sc. degrees in zoology in 1961 and 1965, respectively, from the University of London. Thereafter, he obtained a Ph.D. degree in zoology from the Stockholm University in 1965.

Nwagwu went to the University of Connecticut in 1966, where he completed spectacular research on myosin messenger RNA and muscle-protein synthesis on his post-doctoral fellowship.

In 1969, he was appointed assistant professor at Brock University, Canada, where he later rose to the rank of associate professor in 1973. Returning to Nigeria, he worked as a senior lecturer at the University of Ibadan until his retirement in 2002. He is also a Fellow at Nigerian Academy of Science.

== Bibliography ==
- Write Me A Poem (2021)
- Time Came Upon Me and Other Poems ISBN 9789789211814 (2019)
- HelenaVenus (2013)
- Cat Man Dew (2012)
- Helen Not-of-Troy (2009)
