= Ayodele Olajide Falase =

Cardiologist and academic administrator (b. 1944)

- Born: Ayodele Olajide Falase; 4 January 1944 (age 82); Osun, Nigeria
- Education: Igbobi College, Yaba Royal College of Physicians and Surgeons of Canada National Postgraduate Medical College of Nigeria University of Ibadan (MBBS)
- Scientific career
- Fields: Cardiology
- Workplaces: WHO

Ayodele Olajide Falase (born 4 January 1944) is a Nigerian cardiologist and academic. He is a former vice chancellor of the University of Ibadan. He served as a WHO Expert committee member on cardiopathies and on a WHO expert panel on cardiovascular disease. Professor Ayodele Falase got the Honorary fellowship award at the University of Ibadan 71st founder's day held in 2019.

== Early life ==
Ayodele was born on 4 January 1944 in the village of Erin-Oke, Oriade local government of Osun state, Nigeria.

Ayodele completed his education in the following schools:

- Secondary education at Remo Secondary School, Segamu, Lagos State, Nigeria - 1956
- Igbobi College, Yaba - 1957–62
- University of Ibadan - 1963–68
- Royal College of Physicians, UK - 1971
- National Postgraduate Medical College of Nigeria - 1976
- Royal College of Physicians of London - 1982

== Career ==
Ayodele started his career at University College Hospital, Ibadan in 1968–69, immediately after graduation from the same university. He became a house physician in 1969-70 and a registrar in 1971–72, in the same college hospital. He held several positions on this career path until he rose to become a professor of cardiology and founder of Pan African Society of Cardiology (PASCAR). He was awarded the Nigerian National Merit Award in 2005 and currently one of the four Emeritus Professors at the Department of Medicine, University of Ibadan. An Introduction to Clinical Diagnosis in the Tropics, a popular clinical clerkship book among Nigerian clinical medical students was first published by him in 1986.

== Research ==
Ayodele's publications include subjects on:

- Cardiomyopathy
- Peripartum heart disease
- Infectious and dilated cardiomyopathy
- Hypertension
- Heart failure
- Ischaemic Heart disease
- Congenital heart diseases

== Books ==
The human heart fountain of life: inaugural lecture delivered on Tuesday 27 January 1981

An introduction to clinical diagnosis in the tropics(1986)

Cardiovascular disease(1987)
