= Yetunde Ilori =

Nigerian businessperson

- Born: Nigeria
- Education: University of Lagos
- Occupation: Business executive
- Known for: President of Chartered Insurance Institute of Nigeria

Yetunde Ilori is a Nigerian Insurance Professional. She is the President and Chairman of the Chartered Insurance Institute of Nigeria (CIIN) and a former Director General of the Nigerian Institute Association (NIA). Ilori is known for her contributions to Insurance regulation and professional development within the Nigerian Insurance sector.

== Early life and education ==
Yetunde Ilori was born in Nigeria into a family of five children. Both of her parents are from Abeokuta, Ogun State. Her father was an accountant and the first indigenous general manager of the former Ogun State Hotel (now Park Inn by Radisson), while her mother was an economics teacher. Her parents placed a strong emphasis on education, and her father’s career in finance influenced her eventual path into the financial sector.

Ilori attended Comprehensive High School, Aiyetoro, Ogun State, a co-educational boarding school established with support from the United States Agency for International Development (USAID) and the Ford Foundation, which at the time was regarded as one of the best secondary schools in Nigeria.

She graduated with a Bachelor’s degree in Actuarial Science from the University of Lagos (UNILAG) in 1984. She is an Associate of the Chartered Insurance Institute of London (ACII) and a Fellow of the Chartered Insurance Institute of Nigeria (FCIIN). She is also an alumnus of the Lagos Business School.

== Career ==
Yetunde Ilori began her insurance career in 1985 during her National Youth Service Corps (NYSC) posting to the then Trans Nigeria Assurance Company Limited in Ibadan, Oyo State (a company owned by the former Oyo State Government). She rose to become Head of the Life & Pensions Department and later Head of Claims.

After relocating to Lagos following her marriage, she joined Crusader Insurance Plc in 1997 as Head of Actuarial, Research and Statistics, and was subsequently appointed Head of the Life Department. In 2004, she moved to Guaranty Trust Assurance Plc (later rebranded AXA Mansard Insurance Plc), where she was Chief Executive Officer from an unspecified date until July 2017.

In August 2017, Ilori was appointed Director-General and Chief Executive Officer of the Nigerian Insurance Association (NIA), the umbrella body for all registered insurance and reinsurance companies in Nigeria, a position she held for seven years. During her tenure, the NIA introduced the Nigerian Insurance Industry Database (NIID), a USSD verification platform in partnership with the Nigeria Inter-Bank Settlement System (NIBSS), and an industry trade portal for verifying marine insurance certificates. She also oversaw the construction of the NIA’s six-storey headquarters building in Lagos.

In 2024, Ilori was elected and invested as President of the Chartered Insurance Institute of Nigeria (CIIN), becoming one of the few women to have led a major insurance company as CEO and subsequently head the profession’s apex institute.
