= Ibironke Akinsete =

Nigerian haematologist

- Born: 1938 (age 87–88)
- Citizenship: Nigerian
- Title: Professoor

Academic background
- Education: University of Aberdeen

Academic work
- Discipline: Haematology

Ibironke Akinsete (born 1938) is a Nigerian professor of Haematology and Blood Transfusion and an advocate for women's health. She made a choice of Haematology as her career path due to her been fascinated by blood and how the human body is formed.

== Biography ==
Ibironke Akinsete got her medical degree from University of Aberdeen, Scotland. She also acquired other necessary qualifications on the study of Haematology from the same university.

Akinsete worked in University of Lagos, where she served and retired as a Consultant to the Department of Haematology, in the College of Medicine. She served as the Chairman of the Lagos State Blood Transfusion Service. She is also a trustee of AIDS Prevention Initiative in Nigeria and a life patron of the Society for Women & AIDS in Africa, Nigeria (SWAAN), Prof. Akinsete was the pioneer Chairman of the National Action Committee on AIDS- NACA.

Akinsete was appointed Fellow of the Nigerian Academy of Science in 2006. In 2017, she was awarded the Lifetime Achievement Awards at the Nigerian Healthcare Excellence Award (NHEA) for her commitment to excellence and quality healthcare.
