= Catherine Falade =

Nigerian professor of pharmacology and therapeutics

Catherine Olufunke Falade

Professor of pharmacology and therapeutics at University of Ibadan
- Incumbent
- Assumed office 2008

Personal details
- Born: 25 November 1952 (age 73)
- Citizenship: Nigeria
- Education: University of Ibadan; M.Sc (Pharmacology); University of Ibadan; MB.BS (with distinction in Pediatrics); University of Ibadan
- Occupation: Medical Doctor; Pharmacologist; Academic; Educational Administrator
- Known for: pharmacology and therapeutics Clinical Pharmacology; Pediatrics malaria

Catherine Olufunke Falade (née Falodun) is a professor of pharmacology and therapeutics and also the director of the Institute for Advanced Medical Research & Training at the College of Medicine at the University of Ibadan in Nigeria. She is also a healthcare practitioner specializing as a pharmacologist at the University College Hospital, Ibadan. Her research interest focuses on malaria in children. She collaborates with the Malaria Control Units of both the State and Federal Ministries of Health.

== Background ==
=== Education ===
Falade obtained her MB.BS (with distinction in Pediatrics) from the University of Ibadan, Ibadan, Oyo State, Nigeria from 1969 to June, 1975 and masters in pharmacology and therapeutics from 1999 to February 2001 from the same institution.

=== Career ===
Falade had her first academic appointment at the University of Ibadan on 28 May 1994 and she was promoted to the position of senior lecturer on 1 October 1997. She was the Acting Head of department at the department of pharmacology and therapeutics from March 2004 to August 2006 and served as the Head of Department from August 2010 to June 2013. She has taught pharmacology and therapeutic courses both in undergraduate and postgraduate levels at the University of Ibadan and has served as an external examiner in various universities which include; University of Lagos, Obafemi Awolowo University, Ladoke Akintola University of Technology, Olabisi Onabanjo University, Ambrose Alli University, Ahmadu Bello University, University of Ilorin, and other institutions. She won the Catherine & Frank D MacArthur Fellowship in 1997. She was a member CDA Independent Data and Safety Management Committee from October 2006 to 2009; member, Pediatric ACT Advisory Committee of Medicine for Malaria Venture (MMV) from September 2007 to date; examiner, National Postgraduate Medical College from 2006 to date; Resource person, West African College of Physicians from 2000 to date; examiner, West African College of Surgeons from 2006 to date. Her research works have been funded by organizations like SmithKline Beecham, the World Health Organization Special Programme for Research and Training in Tropical Diseases (WHO/TDR), Glaxo Wellcome, GlaxoSmithKline, the USAID. She was made a Fellow of the Nigerian Academy of Science in 2016.

== Works ==
She has supervised undergraduate and postgraduate students as well as residents in clinical pharmacology and she has also served as a resource person for peer review journals. She has also collaborated with other researchers as well as carrying out independent researches.
