= Olufemi Bamiro =

Nigerian academic (born 1947)

- Born: Olufemi Adebisi Bamiro; 16 September 1947 (age 78); Ijebu Igbo, Southern Region, British Nigeria (now in Ogun State, Nigeria)
- Education: University of Nottingham (B.Eng); McGill University (PhD.)
- Spouse: Olayinka Obigbesan
- Children: 4
- Scientific career
- Fields: Mechanical Engineering
- Workplaces: University of Ibadan

Olufemi Adebisi Bamiro (born 16 September 1947) is a Nigerian professor of mechanical engineering and former vice-chancellor of the University of Ibadan.

== Early life and education ==
Olufemi was born on 16 September 1947 in Ijebu-Igbo, Ogun State. He attended Molusi College, Ijebu-lgbo and proceeded to Government College, Ibadan, obtaining the best result of the year at the Cambridge Higher School Certificate (Advanced Level), 1967. Afterwards he proceeded as Shell Scholar to the University of Nottingham, Nottingham, England, earning a Bachelor of Science (B.Sc.) degree in mechanical engineering with First Class Honours in 1971. He worked briefly for Shell-BP in Nigeria as pipeline engineer before proceeding to McGill University, Montreal, Canada on Canadian Commonwealth Scholarship, where he obtained PhD degree in 1975 after two and a half years. He returned to Nigeria to commence academic work at University of Ibadan in 1975 and rose rapidly to become the first professor of mechanical engineering in the university in 1983. He is a recognized expert in issues related to science and technology policy, higher education, entrepreneurship studies, and information technology. He also has several publications on micromechanics and technology development in local and international journals.

== Selected publications ==
- Engineering Mechanics for engineering programmes in universities and polytechnics;
- The Pains and Gains of Growth: Case Studies in Entrepreneurship with Prof Albert Alos, the former Vice-Chancellor, Pan-African University, Lagos.
- Mechanics and Strength of Deformable Materials published by the Tertiary Education Trust Fund (TETFund).
- Introductory Technology for Schools and Colleges

== Academic posts ==
- Sub-Dean (General), Faculty of Technology, 1977-1979
- Sub-Dean (Postgraduate), 1982-1983.
- Head of Mechanical Engineering Department(1983-1985)
- Dean of the Faculty of Technology.
- Chairman for the implementation of water supply plan for the University.
- Director of the Management Information System (MIS) Unit
- Deputy vice-chancellor (administration) (2004-2005).
- Vice-Chancellor, December 1, 2005 to November 30, 2010.
- Chairman of Lagos Research and Development Council.

He also participated in programmes with the University of Nairobi, Kenya and the University of Zimbabwe, Harare. With expertise in science and technology policy issues, Entrepreneurship Studies, and Information Technology, he served as Consultant to several companies in both the private and public sectors of the Nigeria’s economy as well as International Agencies.

== Professional bodies ==
- Member of the National Energy Panel that produced energy policy for Nigeria in 1984;
- Member of the Implementation Committee of the National Science and Technology Policy (NSTP). (1987);
- Member of the Permanent Site Development Committee of the University of Agriculture, Abeokuta. (1988);
- Member of the Governing Council, Ogun State Polytechnic, Abeokuta;
- Head of the Nigerian Delegation of the Scientists that visited Iran from August 14‑28, 1990 in respect of Memorandum of Understanding in Science and Technology between Nigeria and the Islamic Republic of Iran;
- Member of the Planning Committee and the Chief Rapporteur of the first Technology Summit by NSE held in 1997 and others
- Vice-Chairman of the Executive Board of the Pan-African Competitiveness Forum (PACF) and the Chairman of the PACF
- He was also involved with the project on sustainable financing for higher education sponsored by MacArthur Foundation and World bank.

== Honours and awards ==
- Association of Mechanical Engineering Academic Session Award in 1999
- Nigerian Society of Engineers Merit Award and the United Nations Human Settlement (UN-Habitat) Best Practice Award in respect of the Organo-Mineral Fertiliser Plant Design and Construction Project.
- Fellow of the Nigerian Academy of Science (FAS),
- Fellow of the Nigerian Society of Engineers (FNSE)
- Fellow of the Nigerian Solar Energy Society (FSESN).
- Fellow of the Nigerian Academy of Engineering

== Personal life ==
He married Olayinka Gladys Banjo in 1973. They have four children.
