= Samuel A. Ilori =

Nigerian mathematician (born 1945)

- Born: 11 January 1945 (age 81)
- Education: University of Ibadan; University of Oxford
- Occupations: Researcher; academician
- Employer: University of Ibadan

Samuel A. Ilori is a Nigerian professor of mathematics at the Faculty of Mathematics, University of Ibadan, Nigeria. He was the former Head of the Department of Mathematics, Dean of the Faculty of Mathematics, former Provost of the College of Science and Technology, and ex- National President of the Mathematical Association of Nigeria. He is also a member of African Academy of Sciences.

== Early life and education ==
Ilori was born on 11 January 1945. He obtained his first degree, B.Sc. in mathematics with first class honors in 1968 from the University of Ibadan in Nigeria. He then moved to the United Kingdom to obtain a Diploma in Advanced Mathematics in 1969 from the University of Oxford, and in 1972, he obtained a D.Phil. degree in mathematics from the same university.

== Career ==
He was the sub Dean of Physics and Mathematics from 1977 – 1979. Later on, he went on to become the Dean of the faculty in 1990 and the Provost of College of Science and Technology in 1994. In 2003, he became the head of the department of mathematics.
