= Adeyinka Abideen Aderinto =

Nigerian academic

Adeyinka Abideen Aderinto is a Nigerian Professor of Sociology, the former dean and the former deputy vice chancellor at the University of Ibadan.

== Early life, education, and career ==
Adeyinka Abideen Aderinto received his primary certificate from Abadina primary school between 1973 and 1978. He started secondary school at Ede Muslim grammar school in 1978 and completed it in 1983 at Abadina College. He obtained his Bachelor of Science from the University of Ibadan in sociology in 1988 and his MSc. in sociology in 1991.

He is the former deputy vice chancellor of the University of Ibadan.

Aderinto was a grantee of the Macarthur Foundation Fund for Leadership Development and a fellow of the Bill and Melinda Gates Summer Institute on Reproductive Health and Development, Johns Hopkins Bloomberg School of Public Health.

== Selected publications ==
- ‘If We Must Wait for Total Peace Before Thinking of Returning, We May Never Have a Place Called Home’: Support Mechanisms for Displaced Victims of Herder-Farmers Conflict in Benue State, Nigeria
- Prevalence and predictive factors for early initiation of breastfeeding in Nigeria: Evidence from the Nigerian demographic and health survey
- Hierarchical modelling of factors associated with anemia among under-five children in Nigeria
- Prevalence and patterns of anthropometric failure among under-five children in Nigeria: Evidence from the National nutrition and health survey, 2018
- Assessment of diagnostic accuracy and adherence to maternal and child health guidelines as a measure of clinical competence of frontline healthcare workers in Nigeria
- Individual and ecological analyses of antenatal care: Prospects for delivery assistance and use of modern family planning in Nigeria
- Missed opportunities for HIV counselling and testing service delivery among pregnant women in Nigeria: Evidence from the 2018 National nutrition and health survey
- Uptake of modern and traditional contraceptive methods in Nigeria: Lessons from a nationwide initiative on programming for results (2015-2018)
- Pathways and Motivations for Cyber Fraud Involvement among Female Undergraduates of Selected Universities in South-West Nigeria
- The Significance of Malpractice Claims in the Management of Child Adoption Demands in Southwest Nigeria
