= Consortium for Advanced Research Training in Africa =

Research training organization

The Consortium for Advanced Research Training in Africa abbreviated as CARTA is a partnership involving eight academic and four research institutions from Sub-Saharan Africa to strengthen research infrastructure and the management capacity of African universities. CARTA was established in 2008. It also focuses on the provision of support for a doctoral training program in public and population health.
