= Mojeed Olayide Abass =

Nigerian academic

Mojeed Olayide Abass OON
- Born: 1943 (age 82–83)
- Citizenship: Nigerian
- Occupations: Educator; computer scientist; researcher

Mojeed Olayide Abass, OON (born 1943) is a Nigerian professor of computer science at the University of Lagos and former Deputy Vice Chancellor of the University of Lagos.

== Education and career ==
Abass obtained a bachelor's degree in computer science from the University of Lagos before he proceeded to the University of Waterloo where he received a master (M.sc) and doctorate degree (Ph.D.). He joined the University of Lagos as academic staff and rose to the position of full Professor before he was appointed Deputy Vice Chancellor of the university. In 2008, he retired from the University of Lagos having attained the compulsory retirement age of 65 years and was honored by the university with the book entitled: Olayide Abass: On the dynamics of an Evolving Knowledge Society making him the fourth retired University of Lagos scholar to be honoured with the book. In 2012, he was elected as fellow of the Nigerian Academy of Science. He is currently the President of the University of Lagos Alumni Association.
