= Pharmaceutical Society of Nigeria =

Nigerian professional organization

- Abbreviation: PSN
- Established: 1927 (99 years ago)
- Location: Nigeria
- President: Ayuba Tanko Ibrahim
- Website: https://www.psnnational.org

Pharmaceutical Society of Nigeria (PSN) is a professional body for practicing pharmacists in Nigeria and was established in 1927 to instill discipline and maintain professional ethics among its members.

The first president of the association was T.K.E Phillips, who was inaugurated in 1947. In 1956, the association was formally incorporated under its articles of association and was recognised as a professional society in Nigeria by the federal government.

== Aims and objectives ==
- To promote and maintain a high standard of pharmaceutical education in Nigeria
- To maintain a high standard of professional ethics and discipline among its members
- To promote legislation for the enhancement of the image and the interest of the pharmacy profession and the practitioners in Nigeria
- To advice on labour conditions relating to pharmacists
- To collate and disseminate statistical, scientific and other information relating to pharmacy and publish such in an official journal

== Notable members ==
Notable members of the society include Olumide Akintayo, Adelusi Adeluyi, Eme Ufot Ekaette, Ahmed Yakasai, Sam Ohuabunwa, and the incumbent president, Ayuba Tanko Ibrahim.
