= Abayomi =

- Gender: Male
- Language: Yoruba

Origin
- Origin: Nigeria
- Meaning: My enemies tried to mock me, but God didn't allow them.
- Region of origin: Southwestern Nigeria

Abayomi audio is a male-given Yoruba name commonly used as a surname in Nigeria. It means "My enemies tried to mock me, but God didn't allow them". The full form is "Ota ibà yomi sugbon Ọlọ́run òjé".

== Given name ==
- Abayomi Ajayi (born 1961), Nigerian gynecologist
- Abayomi Barber, Nigerian contemporary artist
- Abayomi Mighty (born 1985), Nigerian youth ambassador to the United Nations
- Abayomi Olonisakin, Nigerian Chief of Defence Staff
- Abayomi Owonikoko Seun (born 1992), Nigerian-Georgian football player
- Oyinkansola Abayomi Nigerian politician

== Surname ==
- John Augustus Abayomi-Cole (1848–1943), Sierra Leonean medical doctor and herbalist
- Kofo Abayomi (1896–1979), Nigerian ophthalmologist
- Oyinkansola Abayomi (1897–1990), Nigerian nationalist and feminist
