= Oluwatoyin =

Oluwatosin
- Gender: Unisex
- Language: Yoruba

Origin
- Origin: Southwest of Nigeria
- Meaning: God is worthy to be praised

Other names
- Short form: Toyin

Oluwatoyin is a given name of Yoruba origin meaning "God is worthy to be praised". The diminutive form is Toyin.

== Notable people ==
- Abike Kafayat Oluwatoyin Dabiri-Erewa (born 1962), Nigerian politician
- Adeola Oluwatoyin Akinbiyi (born 1974), English former professional footballer
- Anaïs Oluwatoyin Estelle Marinho (born 2000), British singer-songwriter known professionally as Arlo Parks
- Clara Nneka Oluwatoyin Folashade Chukwurah (born 1964), Nigerian actress
- Christianah Oluwatoyin Oluwasesin (1977–2007), Nigerian teacher
- Kafayat Oluwatoyin "Kaffy" Shafau (born 1980), Nigerian dancer
- Kehinde Oluwatoyin Ladipo, Nigerian geologist
- Oluwatoyin Asojo, Nigerian chemistry professor
- Oluwatoyin Ogundipe (born 1960), Nigerian academic
- Oluwatoyin Salau (2000–2020), American murder victim
- Oluwatoyin Sanni (born 1965), African investment banker
- Tolulope Oluwatoyin Sarah Arotile (1995–2020), Nigerian pilot

== See also ==
- Toyin
