= Abuja Declaration =

Abuja Declaration may refer to:

- Abuja Declaration (1989), made by members of the Organisation of Islamic Cooperation
- Abuja Declaration (2001), a pledge by African Union countries to increase government health funding
