= Oladunni =

Yoruba given name

- Gender: Unisex
- Language: Yoruba

Origin
- Meaning: 'wealth is sweet to have' or 'honour is pleasant'

Oladunni (Yoruba: Ọládùnní, pronounced [ɔ̄ládũ̀ní]) is a Yoruba given name of Nigerian origin. The name is derived from the Yoruba words ọlá meaning 'wealth', 'honour', or 'nobility', and dùn ní meaning 'sweet to have' or 'pleasant'. The name thus means 'wealth is sweet to have' or 'honour is pleasant'. It is mainly used among the Yoruba people of southwestern Nigeria.

== Notable people ==
- Serifatu Oladunni Oduguwa (1949–1978; popularly known by her stagename Queen Oladunni Decency or Queen Mummy Juju), Nigerian singer and guitarist who specialized in the Jùjú genre of music.
- Grace Oladunni Taylor (also known as Grace Oladunni Lucia Olaniyan-Taylor; 1937–2025), biochemist, formerly at University of Ibadan.
