= Catherine Odora Hoppers =

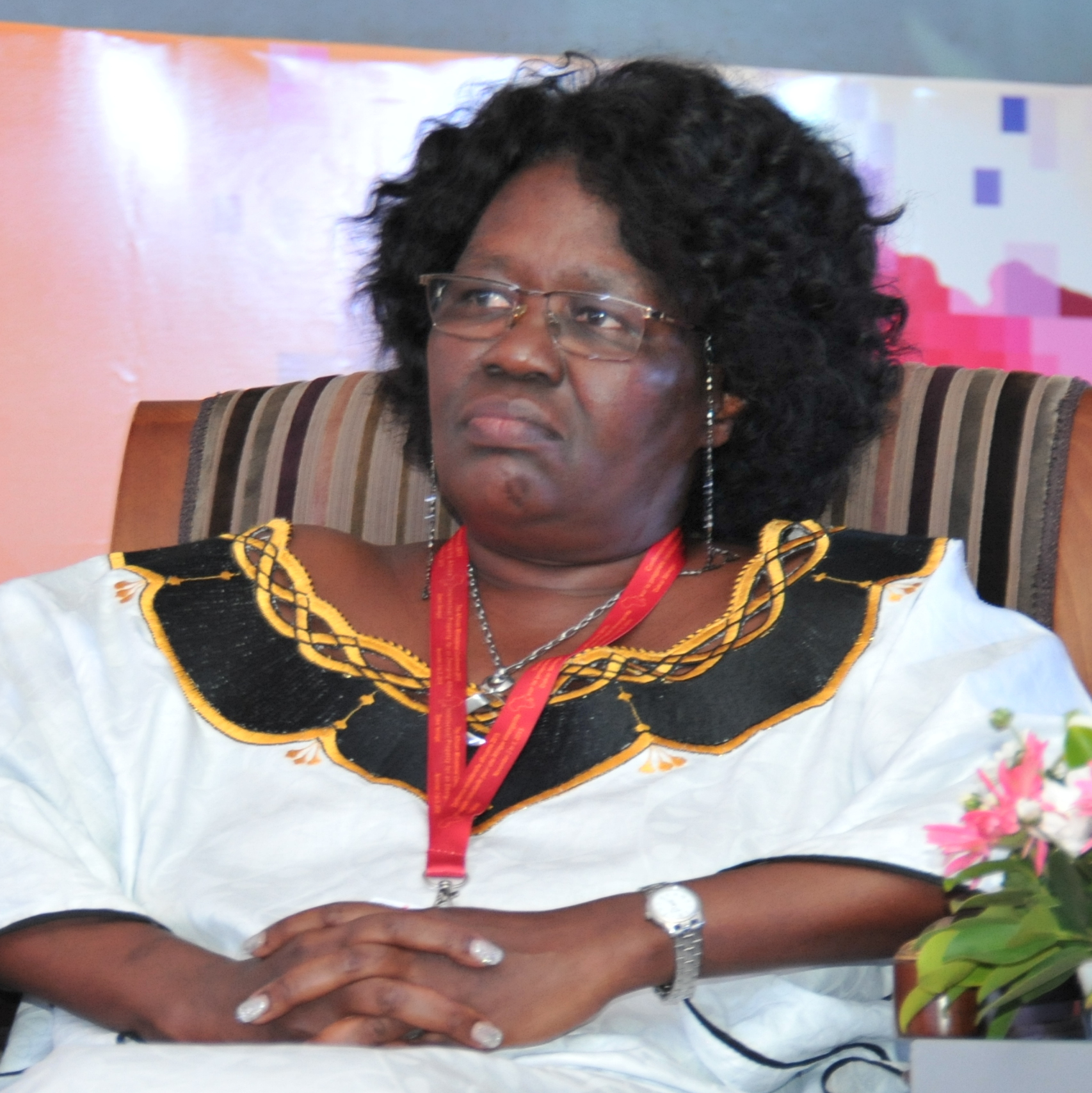
- by WIPO in 2015
- Born: July 3, 1957 (age 69); Gulu
- Education: Stockholm University (Doctorate in international pedagogy)
- Occupation: Professor
- Employer: University of South Africa in Pretoria
- Children: Maureen Odora Hoppers, Anna Hoppers, George M. Odora Hoppers

Catherine Alum Odora Hoppers (born July 3, 1957) is a Ugandan-born Professor in Development Education in South Africa. She has worked in Sweden, was based (2020) in South Africa, and now (2025) at the University of Calgary, in Alberta, Canada.

== Life ==
Odora Hoppers was born in Uganda. She studied in Uganda, Zambia and Sweden. She has a doctorate in international pedagogy from Stockholm University. She has worked as an international policy adviser to UNESCO and to World Intellectual Property Organization (WIPO) and the governments of South Africa and Uganda.

In 2008 she was a technical adviser on Indigenous Knowledge Systems to the Parliamentary Portfolio Committee on Arts, Culture, Science and Technology when she became a Professor as the South African Research Chair in Development Education. This was a national position established by South Africa's Department of Science and Technology in Pretoria.

She is currently (2020) living in Gulu, Uganda.

== Awards ==
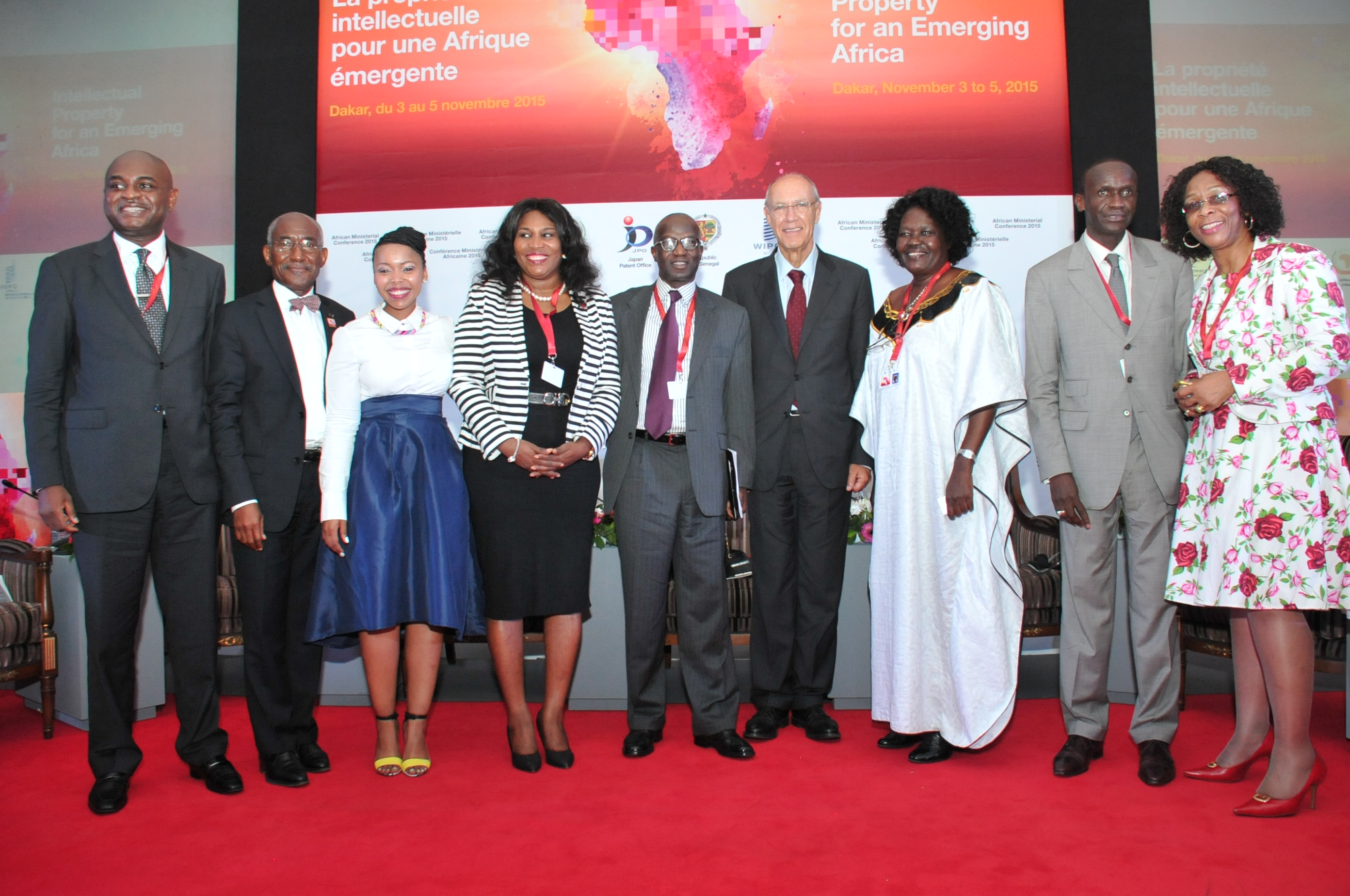
Discussing Africa in a Knowledge-Based Economy in 2015. Left to Right: Kingsley Moghalu, Martial De-Paul Ikounga, journalist Nozipho Mbanjwa, Oluwatoyin Sanni, Julius Akinyemi, Francis Gurry, Odora-Hoppers, Mactar Silla and Snowy Khoza

Odora Hoppers was awarded an honorary doctorate from Örebro University in Philosophy in 2008 and another from Nelson Mandela Metropolitan University in South Africa in 2012. The following year she received The President's Award (2013) from Uganda's President on the 50th Anniversary of Uganda's Declaration of Independence. She has also received The National Pioneers Award (2014) from " The Elders " for promoting the African knowledge system over the past 20 years since South Africa's democratic liberation.

On July 3, 2015, the Nelson Mandela Distinguished Africanist Award was presented to Odora Hoppers by HE Thabo Mbeki at the University of South Africa in Pretoria, South Africa and that year she was named "Woman of the Year" and "Leading Educationist" by the University of South Africa.

In 2017 she became an honorary fellow of UNESCO's Institute for Lifelong Learning.

=== Books and anthologies (selected) ===
- "Indigenous Knowledge and the Integration of Knowledge Systems: Towards a Conceptual and Methodological Framework, pages 2-22. Chapter in Indigenous Knowledge and the Integration of Knowledge Systems. Towards a Philosophy of Articulation . Odora Hoppers CA ed. Cape Town. New Africa Books. 2002. ISBN 1-919876-58-8
- "Evolution / Creationism Debate: Insights and Implications from the Indigenous Knowledge Systems Perspective", p. 74-88. Chapter in The Architect and the Scaffold: Evolution and Education in South Africa . James W. & Wilson L. Cape Town, Human Sciences Research Council Publishers & New Africa Books. 2002. ISBN 07969-2003-6
- Indigenous Knowledge and the Integration of Knowledge Systems: Towards a Philosophy of Articulation. Editor. 2002. ISBN 1-919876-58-8
- "The Development Gulag, Sustainable Human Development, and Their Implications for Africa's Self Image and Renewal", p. 157-174. Chapter in Chasing Futures. Africa in the 21st Century - Problems and Prospects. Prah KK & Teka T. Cape Town. CASAS & OSSREA. 2003. ISBN 1-919932-03-8
- "African Renaissance, Indigenous Knowledge, and the Challenge of Integrating Knowledge Systems", p. 412-428. Chapter in Globalizing Africa. Smith M. ed. Trenton NJ. Africa World Press. 2003. ISBN 0-86543-870-6
- "Eco-Social Wisdom of Billions and the Philosophy of its Articulation: Ethical and Strategic Imperatives", p. 14-38. Chapter in Multiple Languages, Literacies and Technologies. Slide PV ed. New Delhi & Frankfurt. 81-89164-11-2. 2004 ISBN 3-937565-00-0
- "Culture, Indigenous Knowledge and Development: The Role of the University", p. 42, Johannesburg. Center for Education Policy Development. 2005. ISBN 0-9584749-2-3
- "Between 'Mainstreaming' and 'Transformation': Lessons and Challenges for Institutional Change", p. 55-74. Chapter in Gender Equity in South African Education 1994-2004 . Chisholm L. & September J. Cape Town. HSRC Press. 2005. ISBN 0-7969-2094-X
- "Constructing a Conceptual Framework for Historically Black Universities (HBUs) in a Developmental Paradigm", p. 47-64. Chapter in Within the Realms of Possibility. From Disadvantage to Development at the University of Fort Hare and the University of the North. Nkomo M; Swartz D; Maja B. Human Sciences Research Council Press. 2006. ISBN 0-7969-2155-5
- "Establishing a Systems Dialogue between South Africa and Sweden", p. 1-14. Chapter of Odora Hoppers; Gustavsson B; Motala E; Pampallis J. Democracy and Human Rights in Education and Society: Explorations from South Africa and Sweden. Örebro University. Örebro University Press. 2007. ISBN 978-91-7668-543-3
- "Towards a Systems Dialogue: Exploring Issues in Educational Reform in Sweden and South Africa", p. 15-35. Chapter of Odora Hoppers; Lundgren UP Pampallis J.; Motala E; Nihlfors E., Dilemmas of Implementing Education Reforms. Explorations from South Africa and Sweden. Uppsala University. STEP. 2007. ISBN 9789189444270
