= Wang Binying =

Chinese lawyer

Binying Wang
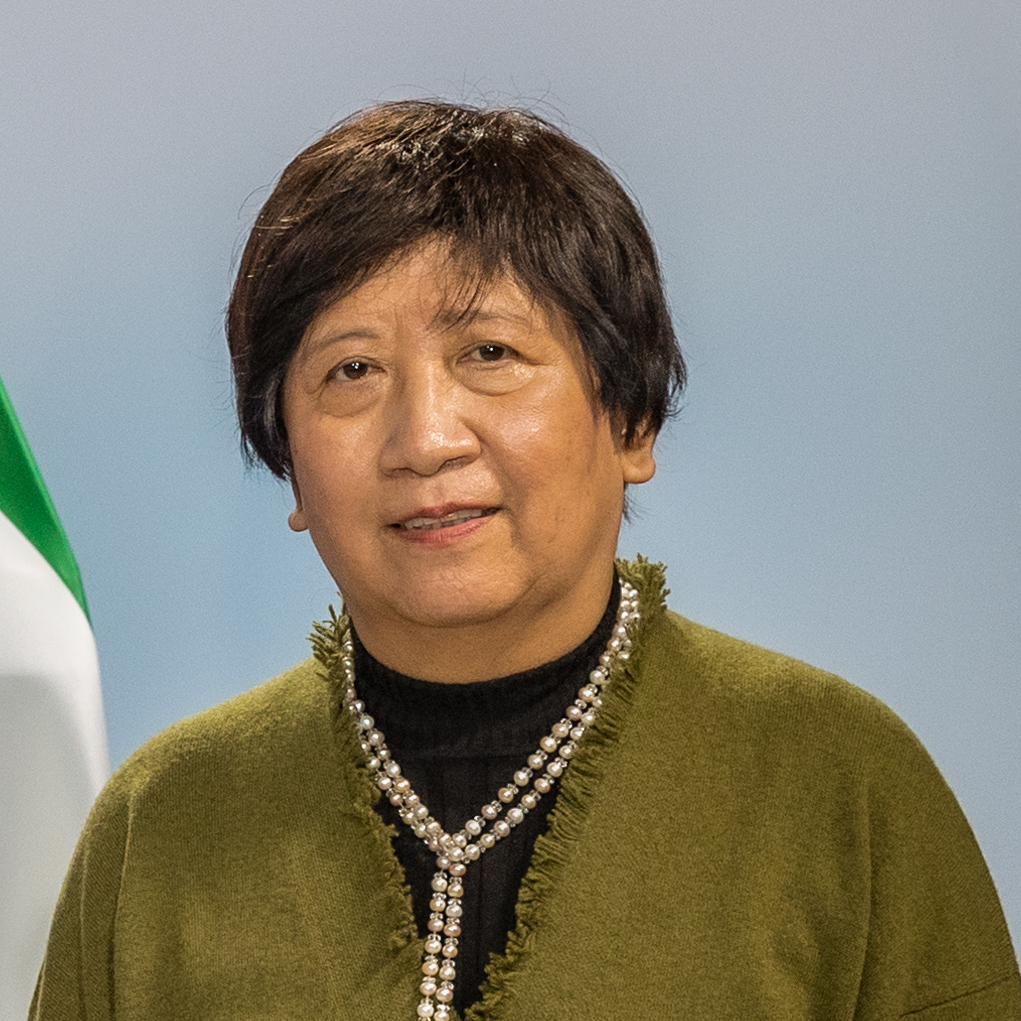
- Education: University of California (Berkeley); Columbia Law School; Zhongnan University
- Employer: World Intellectual Property Organization (WIPO)

Binying Wang is a Chinese lawyer who is the Deputy Director-General who leads the Brands and Designs Sector for the World Intellectual Property Organization (WIPO).

== Early life and education ==
Wang attended the University of California, Berkeley, where she graduated with a master's degree in law. She studied American law at Columbia Law School, and she has a degree in English from Zhongnan University.

== Career ==
From 1975 to 1980 Wang was employed by the Chinese Ministry of Communication and Transportation in Tanzania and Zambia and she later joined World Intellectual Property Organization (WIPO) in April 1992.

The WIPO Director-General Francis Gurry ended his tenure leading WIPO in 2020. Gurry, an Australian lawyer, had led the organisation from 2008. His second six-year term completed at the end of September 2020. There were six candidates to replace Gurry from China, Singapore, Colombia, Kazakhstan, Peru and Ghana. Wang was a strong candidate for the job with thirty years of experience at WIPO. The Chinese ambassador to the UK Liu Xiaoming wrote to the Financial Times in March 2020 to underline her independence, her credentials and China's commitment to protecting intellectual property. Observers saw Wang's nomination to replace him as part of a geopolitical battle to improve China's international representation.

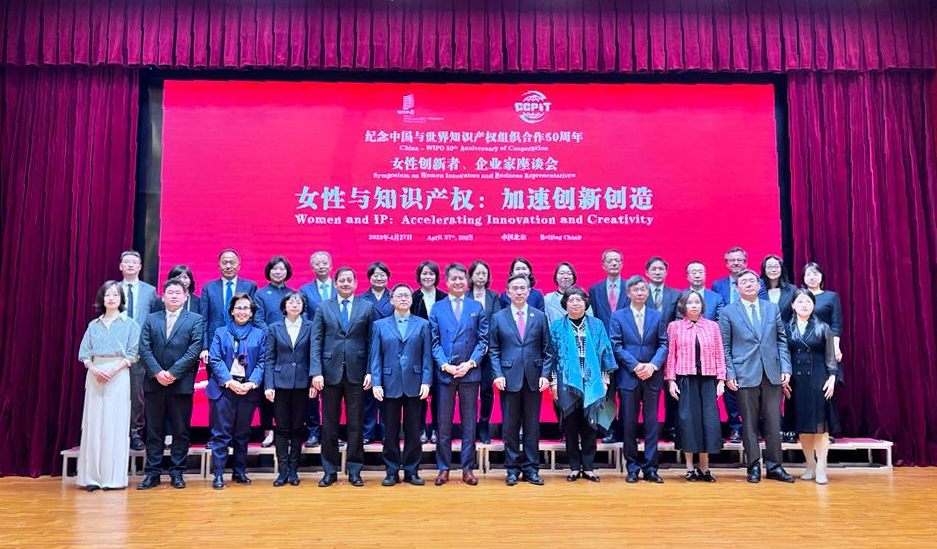
WIPO Director General and Deputy Wang Meet with Women Innovators in China in 2023

On 4 March 2020, Daren Tang won the nomination for the post of Director General of the WIPO, with the backing of 54 countries including the United States. Wang was China's preferred candidate, and she received 28 votes from the members of the WIPO Coordination Committee. Tang took his new position on 1 October 2020. with Wang leading the Brands and Designs sector of WIPO.

In 2023, a WIPO delegation including Tang and Wang visited China in 2023.

In 2025 she was in Quanzhou for the Chinese Government's World Internet Conferences Digital Silk Road Development Forum. Binying was one of the key note speakers.
