= Daren Tang =

Singaporean lawyer (born 1972)

- 邓鸿森
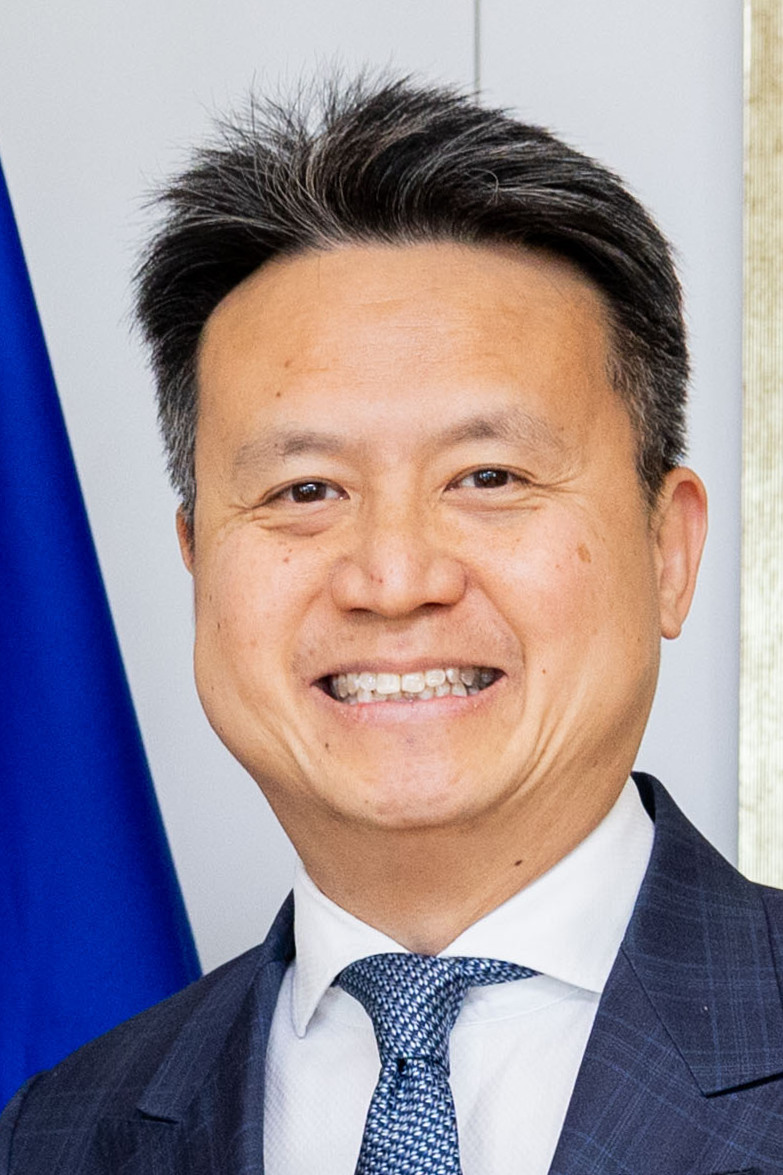
- Tang in 2026

5th Director General of the World Intellectual Property Organization
- Preceded by: Francis Gurry

Chief Executive of Intellectual Property Office of Singapore
- In office 1 October 2020 – July 2020
- Succeeded by: Rena Lee

5th Director General of the World Intellectual Property Organization
- In office October 1, 2026 – September 30, 2032

Personal details
- Born: 1972 (age 53–54) Singapore
- Education: National University of Singapore (LLB); Georgetown University (LLM)

Daren Tang Heng Shim (Chinese: 邓鸿森; born 1972) is the fifth and current Director General of the World Intellectual Property Organization (WIPO). Tang was reappointed on 21 April 2026 for a second term that will run from 1 October 2026 through 30 September 2032. He is also Secretary-General of the International Union for the Protection of New Varieties of Plants (UPOV). Tang previously headed the Intellectual Property Office of Singapore (IPOS) and was a trade lawyer for the government of Singapore.

== Education ==
Tang holds a degree from the Faculty of Law of the National University of Singapore, and a Master of Laws (LL.M.) from the Georgetown University Law Center.

== Career ==
=== Lawyer ===
Tang served as a trade lawyer and was a lead Singapore negotiator for the eventual United States-Singapore Free Trade Agreement signed May 6, 2003. Tang also led IP negotiations for Singapore in the Trans-Pacific Partnership, the Regional Comprehensive Economic Partnership, and the European Union-Singapore free trade agreement.

=== Chief Executive of the Intellectual Property Office of Singapore ===
From November 2015 to July 2020, Tang was Chief Executive of the Intellectual Property Office of Singapore (IPOS). While head of IPOS, Tang chaired WIPO's Standing Committee on Copyright and Related Rights.

He was succeeded as CEO of IPOS by Rena Lee.

=== World Intellectual Property Organization Director General ===
==== Candidacy ====
On 4 March 2020, Tang won the nomination for the post of Director General of the World Intellectual Property Organization (WIPO), with the backing of the United States and 54 other countries over China's preferred candidate, Wang Binying, who received 28 votes out of the 83 voting members of the WIPO Coordination Committee. On 8 May 2020, Tang was confirmed by the WIPO General Assembly before officially assuming his functions on 1 October 2020.

==== Tenure ====
Tang took office as World Intellectual Property Organization (WIPO) Director General on October 1, 2020, beginning a six-year term. In his acceptance speech, Tang said: “WIPO must work towards a vibrant and forward-looking global intellectual property (IP) ecosystem. It must help the world broaden its perspective of IP beyond its legal and technical aspects to its powerful role as a supporter of entrepreneurs and enterprises, catalyst for investments, driver of economic growth and a promoter of social vibrancy.”

Tang's administration presented to WIPO's member states a medium-term strategic plan to guide the organization's work through 2026. Under the plan, the WIPO secretariat would work more closely with smaller enterprises and individual innovators and creators, who have previously been underserved by the global intellectual property ecosystem. Youth would be a particular focus. The plan aims for WIPO to continue the provision of international IP filing services for patents, trademarks, designs and other IP rights while maintaining fiscal prudence and supporting Member States in their negotiations. Tang's administration launched a new “IP and Innovation Ecosystems Sector” to focus on 'intellectual property commercialization'.

The ultimate purpose of IP is to change people's lives for the better, help entrepreneurs grow their businesses, improve society, and contribute to economic development. Daren Tang, 2021

== Personal life ==
Tang is an accomplished pianist with a love of jazz. He has authored a book on tea under a pen name.

Positions in intergovernmental organisations
| Preceded by Francis Gurry | Director General of World Intellectual Property Organization (WIPO); 2020– | Succeeded by Incumbent |
