= Toyin =

- Language: Yoruba

Origin
- Origin: Nigeria
- Meaning: Worthy of praise
- Region of origin: South western Nigeria

Other names
- Related names: Oluwatoyin, Olutoyin

Toyin audio is a Nigerian given name of Yoruba origin which means "worthy of praise"/"praiseworthy". Toyin is the diminutive form of Oluwatoyin or Olutoyin.

== People named Toyin ==
- Toyin Adekale (born 1963), aka simply 'Toyin', British lovers rock singer
- Toyin Agbetu, British activist
- Toyin Ajayi, CEO and co-founder of Cityblock Health
- Toyin Falola (born 1953), Nigerian historian
- Toyin Odutola (born 1985), Nigerian artist
- Toyin Raji, Nigerian former actor
- Olutoyin Augustus (born 1979), Nigerian hurdler
- Oluwatoyin "Toyin" Salau, Black Lives Matter activist
- Toyin Abraham, Nigerian actress
- Toyin Ajao, (born 1978) interdisciplinary scholar, feminist activist and holistic wellbeing practitioner
