= Babatunde Osotimehin =

Nigerian physician

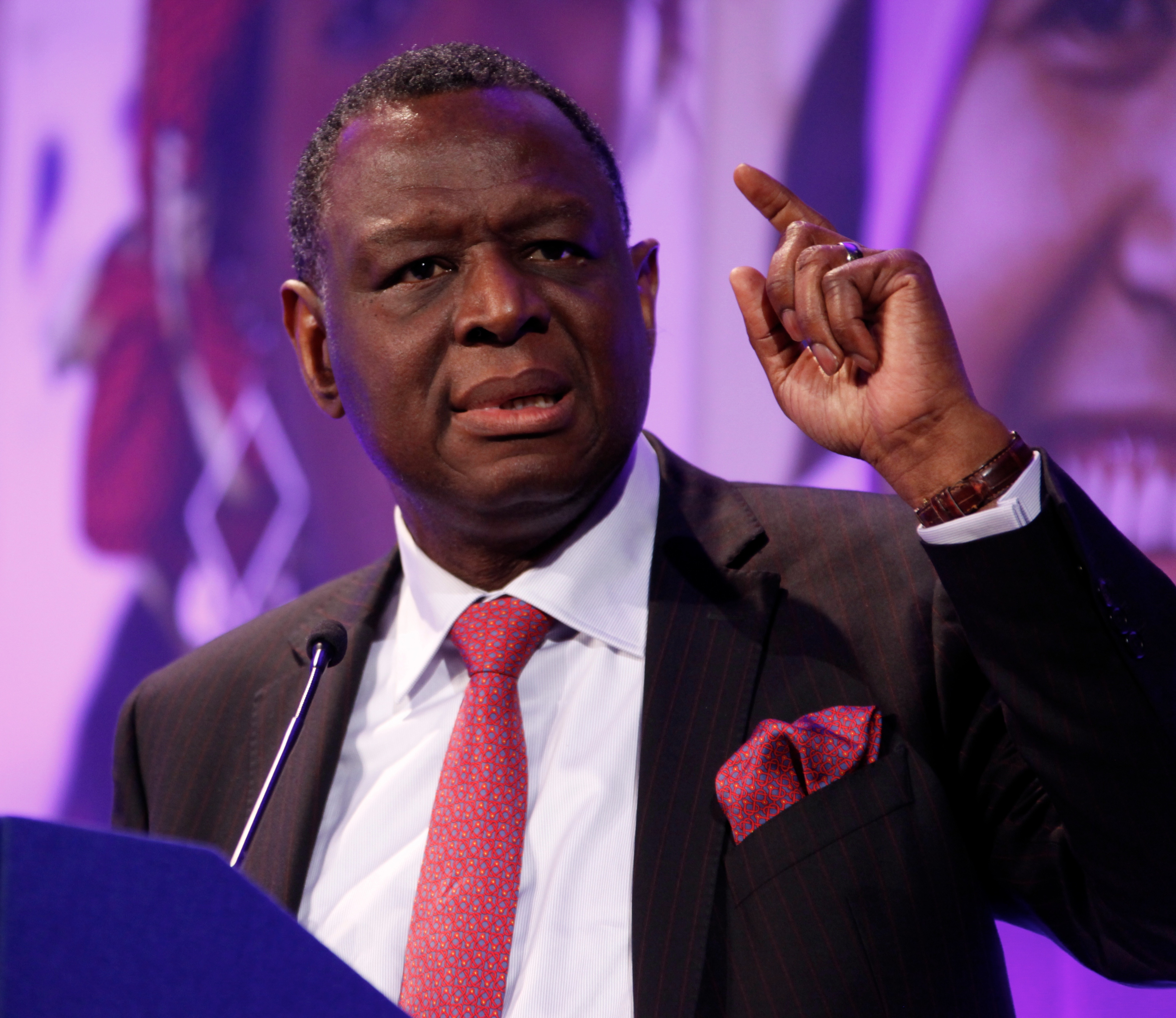
- Osotimehin in 2012

Executive Director of UNFPA, the United Nations Population Fund
- In office 1 January 2011 – 4 June 2017
- Preceded by: Thoraya Obaid
- Succeeded by: Natalia Kanem

Minister of Health
- In office 17 December 2008 – 17 March 2010
- Preceded by: Adenike Grange
- Succeeded by: Onyebuchi Chukwu

Personal details
- Born: 6 February 1949 Ogun State, Nigeria
- Died: 4 June 2017 (aged 68) New York City, United States
- Children: 5

Babatunde Osotimehin (6 February 1949 – 4 June 2017) was a Nigerian physician, who served as Minister of Health, and in 2011 became the executive director of the United Nations Population Fund, holding the rank of Under-Secretary-General of the United Nations, reappointed in August 2014 until his death. Osotimehin's interests were youth and gender, and he advocated for reproductive health and reproductive rights, particularly within the context of the HIV epidemic. One of his strengths was his reliance on data and evidence.

== Early life and education ==
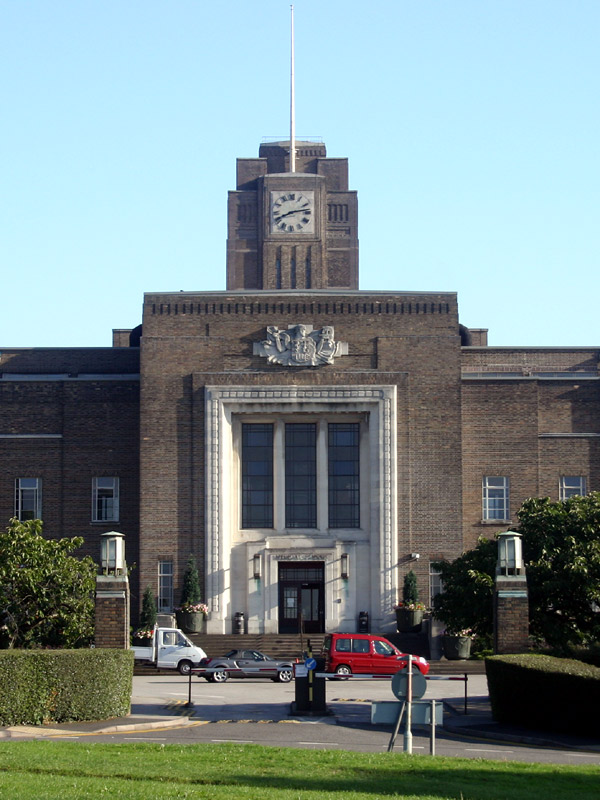
Birmingham University Medical School

Babatunde Osotimehin was born in February 1949 in Ogun State. He attended Igbobi College between 1966 and 1971. He studied medicine at University of Ibadan, Nigeria. In 1979 he moved to the UK for a doctorate at the University of Birmingham, United Kingdom, and from 1979 to 1980 was a fellow in endocrinology at Cornell University Graduate School of Medicine, New York, United States.

== Career ==
In 1980, he returned to Nigeria and became a Professor of Clinical Pathology, the College of Medicine, University of Ibadan. He climbed the academic ladder and from 1990 to 1994 he was Provost of the College of Medicine at Ibadan.

Osotimehin's interests included youth and gender, within the context of reproductive health and rights.

In a 2005 article in The New York Times, he noted that nearly 58 percent of Nigerians with HIV are female. Many girls in Nigeria are married off before they are physically or psychologically ready when they are as young as 13 or 14. It is not acceptable for them to ask their partners to use a condom or to refrain from sex.

Later in 2005, he said that the government had ordered an increase to 250,000 of the number of HIV-positive people on Nigeria's antiretroviral treatment program.

From July 2002 to March 2007 he was chairman of the National Action Committee on AIDS in Nigeria, and from 2002 to 2008, he was project manager for the World-Bank assisted HIV/AIDS Programme Development Project.

In 2005, at the 14th International Conference on AIDS and STIs in Africa (ICASA), he was vice president.

From 2003 to 2008, he was chairman of the governing board, the Joint Regional HIV/AIDS Project in the Abidjan–Lagos Transport Corridor. From March 2007 to December 2008 he was Director-General at the Nigerian National Agency for the Control of AIDS.

=== Minister of Health, 2008–2010 ===
On 17 December 2008, Osotimehin was appointed Minister of Health. During his tenure, he united all 36 states to build a national health plan focused on primary health care. From December 2008 to March 2010, he was the African Spokesperson of the Partnership for Maternal, Newborn and Child Health. Osotimehin contested the view of fellow Nigerians that homosexuality and the transmission of HIV were not an issue in Africa.

In September 2009 press conference, Osotimehin said that Nigeria had yet to comply with the Abuja Declaration that 15% of the budget of each African country should be devoted to health care. Nigeria as a whole was only spending between 8% and 9%, although some states were doing much better.

In October 2009, he pointed out that medical institutions were required by law to treat accident and gunshot victims. Refusal to give treatment could be punished by a jail term.

In December 2009, he reaffirmed the government's commitment to eliminate poliomyelitis and other childhood killer diseases.

He left the office in March 2010, when Acting President Goodluck Jonathan dissolved his cabinet.

=== UNFPA appointment, 2010–2017 ===
On 19 November 2010, Osotimehin was appointed as the executive director of the United Nations Population Fund (UNFPA) for a four-year term. He assumed the position on 1 January 2011 and became the organisation's fourth executive director, holding the rank of Under-Secretary-General of the United Nations.

Young people remained his special focus at UNFPA. "We need to ensure that young people of both genders have equal participation, not only in reproductive rights and health but also within society and in the economy."

He was the Director-General of the Nigerian National Agency for the Control of AIDS, an agency which coordinates all HIV and AIDS work in a country with more than 150 million people. As chairman of the National Action Committee on AIDS (NACA) he oversaw the development of systems which in 2011, managed more than US$1billion.

He believed humility was the key to engaging people and facilitating change, "humility to engage with the other person of the other community in such a way that they know that you respect them." Cultural sensitivity and understanding are also vital. He was married and had five children He was reappointed to the position on 21 August 2014.

== Personal life and death ==
Osotimehin was married to Olufunke. They had five children and five grandchildren.

He died in Harrison, New York, a suburb of Manhattan, on 4 June 2017, aged 68. Colleagues at UNFPA described his confidence, communication skills, and reliance on data and evidence.

== Memberships and affiliations ==
Osotimehin was a member or affiliate of the following:

- Chairman, Committee of Presidential Advisers of AIDS Watch Africa
- Member, Policy and Strategy Committee, The Global Fund to Fight AIDS, Tuberculosis and Malaria
- Member, Global Steering Committee on Universal Access
- Coordinator, the Social Sciences and Reproductive Health Research Network, Ibadan, Nigeria (an interdisciplinary network comprising sociologists, economists, doctors, lawyers, psychologists and human nutritionists dedicated to applying innovative research techniques to reproductive health and human development)
- Member of the Royal College of Physicians (UK)
- Distinguished Visitor, John D. and Catherine T. MacArthur Foundation, Chicago, United States, 1996
- Visiting Fellow, Harvard Centre for Population and Development Studies, Cambridge, Massachusetts, United States, 1996–1997
- Fellow of the Nigerian Academy of Sciences since 2006
- Fellow of the National Postgraduate College of Medicine and Pathology
- Fellow of the West African College of Physicians
- Population Association of America
- International Advisory Group, Population and Reproductive Health, the John D. and Catherine T. MacArthur Foundation, Chicago
- Regional Advisory Panel (Africa and the Middle East), Special Programme on Research and Research Training in the Human Reproduction Programme of the World Health Organization
- Chairman of the committee to draft a Policy on Basic Health Sciences Research and Health Technology Delivery for the Nigerian Government
- Nigerian Society of Endocrinology and Metabolism
- The Nigerian Medical Association
- The Nigerian Institute of Management

== Honours ==
- Awarded the Nigerian National Honour, Officer of the Order of the Niger (OON), December 2005

== Selected bibliography ==
Osotimehin wrote or contributed to many papers and several books. A selection follows:

- N. C. den Boer, ed. (1989). "Clinical Biochemistry Services in Tropical Africa". Clinical chemistry: an overview. Springer. ISBN 978-0-306-43093-0.
- Erinosho, Olayiwola A.; Osotimehin, Babatunde; Olawoye, Janice E. (1996). Women's Empowerment and Reproductive Health. Bookcraft Ltd, for Social Sciences and Reproductive Health Research Network. ISBN 978-978-2030-14-6.
- Osotimehin, Babatunde (1999). Male responsibility in reproductive health: the construction of manhood in Nigeria : phase I. The Social Science and Reproductive Health Research Network. ISBN 978-978-028-569-2.
- Celentano, David; Beyrer, Chris (2008). "12: Nigeria and West Africa". Public Health Aspects of HIV/AIDS in Low and Middle Income Countries: Epidemiology, Prevention and Care. Springer. ISBN 978-0-387-72710-3.
- Osotimehin, Babatunde (2008). The control of HIV/AIDS in Nigeria: the journey so far. WHARC.
