= Francis Gurry =

Australian lawyer (born 1951)

Francis Gurry AO
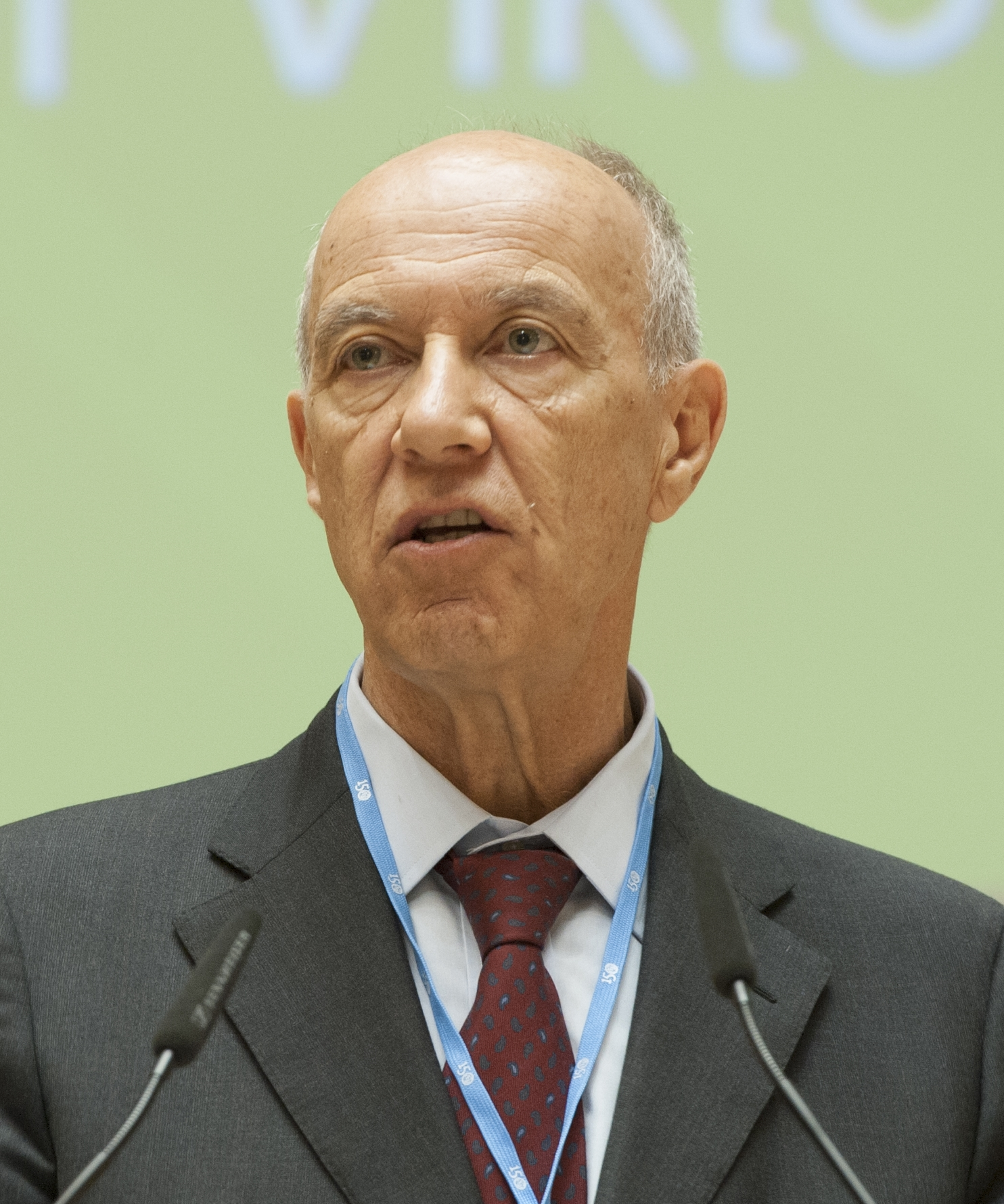
- Gurry in 2015

4th Director General of the World Intellectual Property Organization
- In office 1 October 2008 – 30 September 2020
- Preceded by: Kamil Idris
- Succeeded by: Daren Tang

Personal details
- Born: 17 May 1951 (age 75) Australia
- Children: 3

Francis Gerard Gurry AO (born 17 May 1951) is an Australian lawyer who served as the fourth director general of the World Intellectual Property Organization (WIPO) from 2008 to 2020. During that time, he was also the secretary-general of the International Union for the Protection of New Varieties of Plants (UPOV). Gurry also served as a deputy director general of WIPO from 2003 to 2008.

== Career ==
Gurry graduated in 1974 from the University of Melbourne where he was resident at Ormond College with a Bachelor of Laws and was admitted as a barrister and solicitor of the Supreme Court of Victoria, Australia in 1975. He worked in Melbourne as an articled clerk and solicitor at Arthur Robinson & Co. (now Allens) and earned a Master of Laws degree from the University of Melbourne in 1976. From 1976 to 1979, Gurry was a research student at the Faculty of Law at the University of Cambridge, United Kingdom, from which he was awarded a PhD in 1980 for his thesis dealing with breach of confidence.

Before joining WIPO, Gurry was a senior lecturer in law at the University of Melbourne and, for one year, a solicitor at Freehills, Melbourne. He was also a visiting professor of law at the University of Dijon, France.

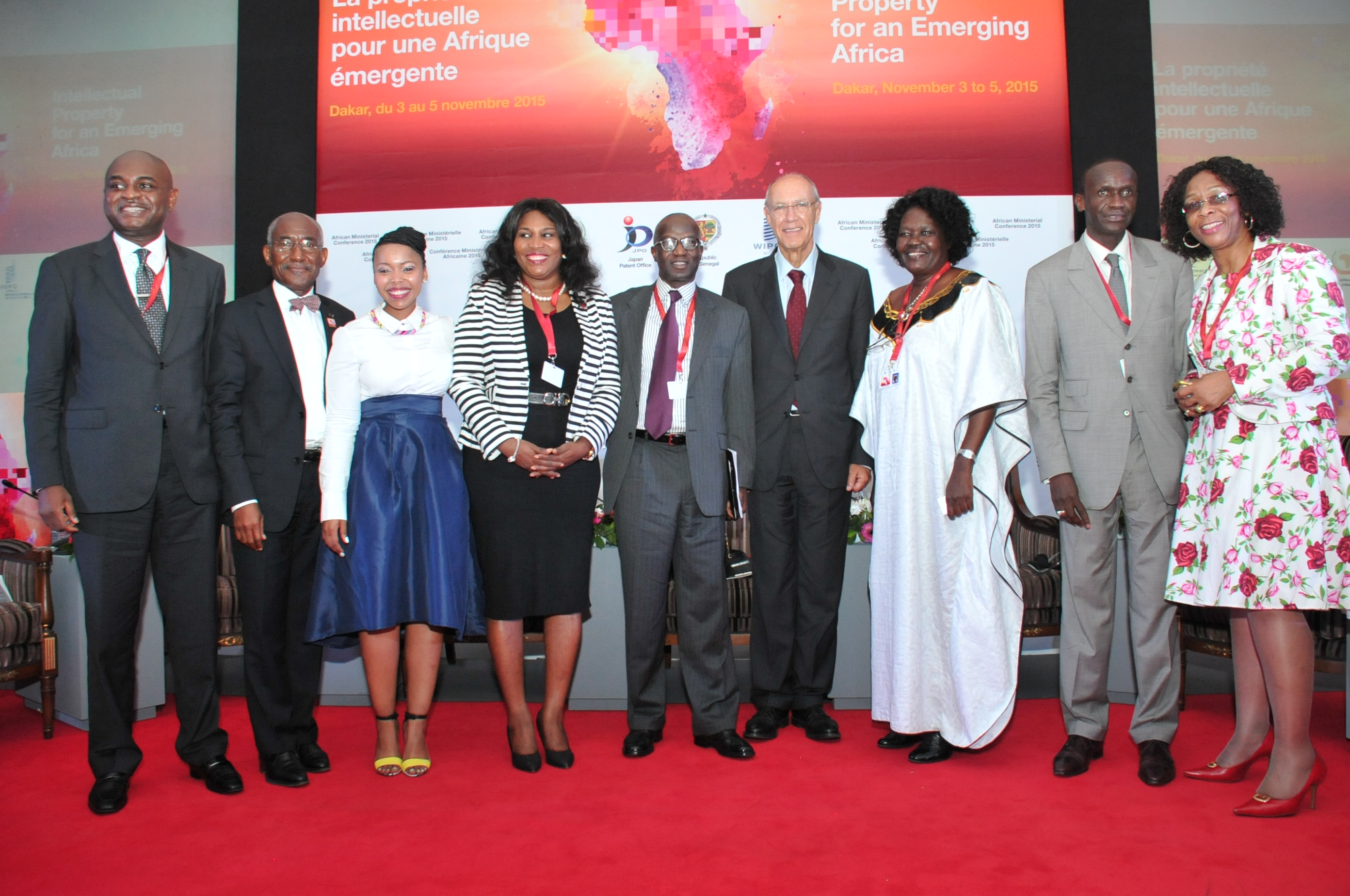
Discussing Africa in a Knowledge-Based Economy in 2015. Left to Right: Kingsley Moghalu, Martial De-Paul Ikounga, journalist Nozipho Mbanjwa, CEO Oluwatoyin Sanni, Julius Akinyemi, Gurry, Catherine Odora Hoppers, Mactar Silla and Snowy Khoza.

Francis Gurry joined the World Intellectual Property Organization in 1985 as a consultant and senior program officer in the Regional Bureau for Asia and the Pacific. Between 1988 and 1999, he held positions in different sectors of WIPO, including in the Industrial Property Law Section, the Office of the Director General, and the Legal Counsel Office. As Assistant Director General (from 1999-2003) and Deputy Director General (from 2003-2008), he was in charge of a variety of areas including the Patent Cooperation Treaty (PCT), patent law and policy, the WIPO Arbitration and Mediation Center (which he helped establish), traditional knowledge, traditional cultural expressions and genetic resources, and life sciences.

Francis Gurry was nominated as a candidate for the position of Director General of WIPO in February 2008 and won the election on 13 May 2008. On 22 September 2008, he was appointed Director General by the WIPO General Assembly. His six-year term started on 1 October 2008 and ran to the end of September 2014. Following his nomination by the WIPO Coordination Committee, the WIPO General Assembly on 8 May 2014 appointed Gurry for a second 6-year term running through September 2020.

In 2016, WIPO initiated the High-Level Conference on Intellectual Property for BRI Countries. At the conference, Gurry encouraged countries participating in the Belt and Road Initiative to use WIPO tools like its global IP services and databases and to join WIPO-administered IP treaties.

Gurry has been accused of trying to retaliate against a whistleblower by authorizing security staff to enter senior staff offices and take personal items away for DNA testing; improperly awarding an IT procurement contract to an acquaintance; and breaking United Nations Security Council sanctions by sending IT equipment to North Korea and Iran. An investigation was conducted by the UN Office of Internal Oversight Services (OIOS) but its report has been shrouded in secrecy. 17 WIPO member states have asked the WIPO Coordination Committee to review the report so the issues can be resolved. On the DNA case, OIOS was unable to obtain cooperation from the Swiss authority (paragraph 66 of the OIOS Report). On the procurement case, OIOS found that Gurry "acted in non-compliance with WIPO's Procurement Instructions" (paragraph 203) and recommended the Chair of the WIPO General Assembly "consider taking appropriate action against Mr. Francis Gurry" (paragraph 206). Nevertheless, in October 2016, the WIPO Member States decided not to press for sanctions against Gurry.

== Published works ==
=== Books ===
- International Intellectual Property in an Integrated World Economy, Wolters Kluwer, New York, 2nd edition 2012 (with Frederick M. Abbott and Thomas Cottier), ISBN 978-0-7355-3958-7; 1st edition 2007, ISBN 978-0-7355-3958-7
- Breach of Confidence, Oxford University Press, Oxford, 1984, ISBN 0-19-825378-8; second edition Gurry on Breach of Confidence – The Protection of Confidential Information by Tanya Aplin, Lionel Bently, Phillip Johnson, and Simon Malynicz, Oxford University Press, Oxford, 2012, ISBN 978-0199297665
- International Intellectual Property System: Commentary and Materials, Kluwer Law International, The Hague, 1999 (with Frederick M. Abbott and Thomas Cottier), ISBN 90-411-9322-7
- Confidential Information, Oxford University Press, Oxford, 1981

=== Selected articles ===
- "The Cambrian Explosion", International Review of Intellectual Property and Competition Law, vol. 38, no. 3 (2007), pp. 255–258
- "Globalization, Intellectual Property and Development", Proceedings of the American Society of International Law, 2005
- "The Growing Complexity of International Policy in Intellectual Property", Science and Engineering Ethics, vol. 11, no. 1 (2005), pp. 13–20
- "The Dispute Resolution Services of the World Intellectual Property Organization", Journal of International Economic Law, vol. 2, no. 2 (1999), pp. 385–398
- "The Evolution of Technology and Markets and the Management of Intellectual Property Rights", in Frederick M. Abbott and David Gerber (eds.) Public Policy and Global Technology Integration, (Kluwer Law International, London, 1997), ISBN 90-411-0655-3
- "Arbitrage et propriété intellectuelle", in Institut de recherche en propriété intellectuelle Arbitrage et propriété intellectuelle (Libraires Techniques, Paris, 1994), ISBN 2-7111-2383-9

== Honours ==
- Grand Cordon of the Order of the Rising Sun: 2021
- Doctor of Laws (honoris causa), University of Melbourne, 2022
- Officer of the Order of Australia in the 2023 Australia Day Honours

Positions in intergovernmental organisations
Preceded by Kamil Idris	Director General of World Intellectual Property Organization (WIPO); 2008–2020	Succeeded by Daren Tang
