= Bestie Tamara Atti =

Nigerian lawyer and entrepreneur

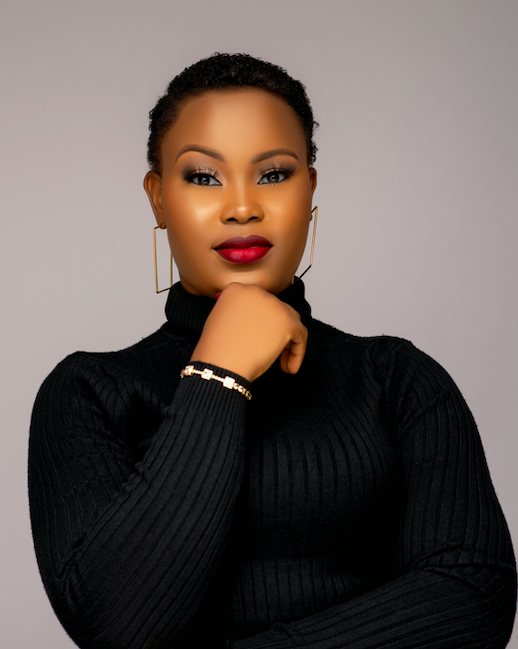
- Born: Warri, Nigeria
- Education: University of Benin, Nigeria
- Occupations: Lawyer, Entrepreneur
- Years active: 2014 – present
- Known for: Founder, Bestie Network Africa; Co-Founder, CorporateBestie Ltd
- Website: www.hellobestie.com, www.bestienetworkafrica.org

Bestie Tamara Atti, also known as Bestie Atti (née Andafa), is a Nigerian lawyer, entrepreneur, digital / online business coach, women development consultant and founder of Bestie Network Africa, a social enterprise that promotes education, entrepreneurship, innovation and leadership for young African women. She is also the co-founder of Corporate Bestie, a business support and marketing firm that provides services to entrepreneurs, start-ups, SMEs and corporations in Nigeria and Africa.

== Early life and education ==
Bestie was born on April 9, 1991, in the city of Warri, Delta State, Nigeria and originates from Bayelsa State. She completed her secondary education at Federal Government College Warri (FGCW) and graduated from the University of Benin, Nigeria in 2013 where she studied Law as a first degree. She was called to the Nigerian Bar in 2014 after graduating from the Nigerian Law School in Abuja.

== Career ==
After her call to the Nigerian Bar, Bestie Tamara Atti was deployed to Abia State, Nigeria,faccessd under the one-year mandatory National Youth Service Corps (NYSC) program, where she served in a World Bank project as a Legal/Operations Officer. She participated in several community development projects that impacted children, women and youths in Abia State. She was recognized and given a State Honours Award as an Outstanding Corps Member for her contributions to the socio-economic development of the state.

Atti has worked with several local and international organizations including Facebook, Google and Ventures Platform Foundation on programs related to SME development, entrepreneurship and digital marketing.

In 2017, she founded Bestie Network Africa, a community that provides tools and opportunities to help professional and entrepreneurial women to build businesses and non-profit organizations across Africa. The flagship event of this community is Fempower Africa which is held annually in celebration of International Women's Day every March 8.

Atti is also the co-founder of Corporate Bestie, a business support and marketing firm that was recognized in 2018 as one of the top 100 emerging SMEs in Nigeria by Connect Nigeria, The British Council and Union Bank.

== Books ==
Bestie Tamara Atti is the author of the ebooks: The Digital Ninja Toolbox: 101+ Tools & Resources for every digitally mobile African and The Value Capital Calculator: The Ultimate Guide to Help You Identify and Maximize Your Value for Global Income, Impact and Influence. She is also the creator of The Design Your Best Life Yearly Planner.
