= Olusunbo Olugbemi =

Nigerian politician

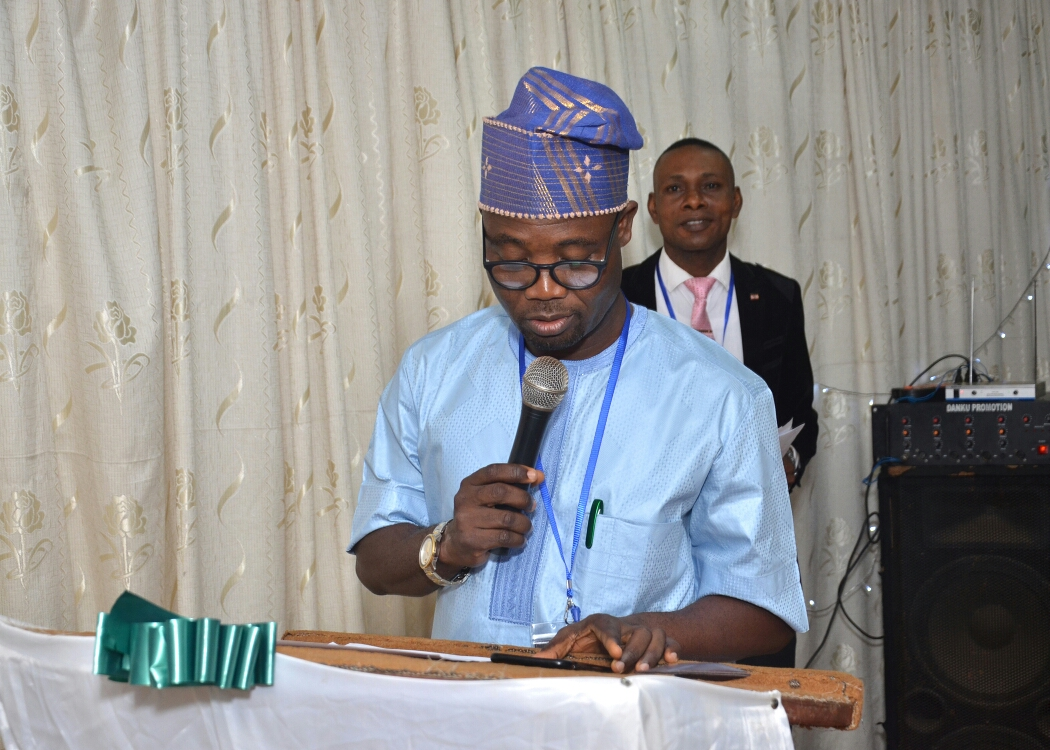
Sunbo Olugbemi

Olusunbo Olugbemi (born October 11, 1967) is a Nigerian politician, and member of the 8th House of Representatives, representing Oluyole Local Government. Sunbo is a member of the All Progressive Congress.

== Early life and education ==
Sunbo Samson Olugbemi was born on October 11, 1967. He is an indigene of Ibadan, from Olugbemi Village near Odo-ona Elewe in Oluyole local government area. His family house is at Kudeti, Ibadan South-East Local Government of Oyo state.

Olugbemi had his primary education at I.D.C. Primary school (Now Olugbemi Primary School) Olugbemi village, Oluyole Local Government. He had his secondary education at ABE Secondary Technical College, Odo-Ona Elewe and Igbo Ora High School respectively. He proceeded to Yaba College of Technology where he earned a diploma certificate in accounting. He further studied business administration at the University of Maryland University College, USA.

== Personal life ==
Olugbemi is a Christian and is married to Oluwakemi Olugbemi with children.

== Career ==
Olugbemi held various positions in Union Bank of Nigeria where he worked for twelve years. He worked in the United States with Afstar Mortgage LLC as a loan consultant. He also acted as an independent marketing representative for 5Linx Communications in Rochester, New York for 3 years, before returning to Nigeria in 2010. He is a marketing director in 5Linx Communications Limited and a non-executive director at Atwool School, Lekki, Lagos.

=== Political career ===
Olugbemi's father was involved in the political circle of Oluyole Local Government and a member of the defunct Action Group and Unity Party of Nigeria during the 1979 elections. Olugbemi has been a member of CAN now APC in Oluyole Local Government since he returned from the US.

In 2015, Olugbemi became a member of the Federal House of Representatives representing Oluyole Local Govt. Federal constituency.
