= Okocha =

- Gender: Male
- Language: Igbo

Origin
- Origin: Nigeria
- Meaning: Fair complexioned male child.
- Region of origin: South East, Nigeria

Okocha audio is a Nigerian surname of Igbo origin, meaning "Fair complexioned male child." The name Okocha like any other unique childbirth, which tells the family position, the circumstances under which the child is born and even the type of birth.

== Notable individuals with the name ==
- Charles Okocha, Nigerian actor
- Daisy W. Okocha (born 1951), Nigerian judge
- Emmanuel Okocha (born 1968), Nigerian footballer
- Jay-Jay Okocha (born 1973), Nigerian footballer
- Nkem Okocha, Nigerian social entrepreneur and activist

== See also ==
- Samed Abdul Awudu (born 1984), Ghanaian footballer; nicknamed "Okocha"
