= Nike Akande =

Nigerian economist and industrialist (born 1944)

Chief Nike Akande CON

President of the Lagos Chamber of Commerce and Industry
- In office 5 December 2015 – 2017
- Preceded by: Ismaila Bello
- Succeeded by: Babatunde Runwase

Personal details
- Born: Onikepo Olufunmike Adisa; 29 October 1944 (age 81) Lagos State, Nigeria
- Spouse: Adebayo Akande
- Education: Queen's School, Ede; North-Western Polytechnic; Harvard Business School; International Institute for Management Development
- Occupation: Industrialist; accountant; economist
- Nike Akande is Nigeria's first female Minister of Industry and second female President of the Lagos Chamber of Commerce & Industry

Onikepo Olufunmike Akande, OON CON (née Adisa, born 29 October 1944) is a Nigerian economist, accountant and industrialist who served as the President of the Lagos Chamber of Commerce and Industry and honorary life vice-president of the Nigerian Association of Chambers of Commerce, Industry, Mines and Agriculture.

== Early life and education ==
A native of Ibadan, Oyo State, Nike was born in Lagos as the first of four children into a royal family. She had her secondary school education at Queen's School, Ede (now Queen's School, Ibadan) after completing her basic education in Ibadan. She holds a B.Sc. in Accountancy from the North-Western Polytechnic (now University of North London) after graduating in 1968. She is also an alumnus of the Harvard Business School and the International Institute for Management Development.

== Career ==
=== Public service ===
Nike became Nigeria's first female Minister of Industry after she was appointed twice in December 1997 and August 1998 under the Sani Abacha-led administration. She was also a delegate at the 2014 National Conference and member of Nigeria Vision 2010 and Vision 20:2020.

=== Private sector ===
Nike is an industrialist and economist who former President Goodluck Jonathan described as "an inspiration". She is a board member of Union Bank of Nigeria and PZ Foundation. She also serves as the director of the National Insurance Corporation of Nigeria and the Nigeria Industrial Development Bank.

On 8 December 2015, Nike was appointed Chairman of the NEPAD Business Group Nigeria succeeding Chris Ezeh. She previously served as the President of the Lagos Chamber of Commerce and Industry, a position she assumed on 5 December 2015.

== Awards and recognition ==
At an event in Addis Ababa, Ethiopia in 1998, Nike was awarded the African Federation of Women Entrepreneur Award. In 2003, she was conferred as an Officer of the Order of the Niger (OON). Nike is also a recipient of the national honour of the Commander of the Order of the Niger (CON) since 2014.

== Personal life ==
Nike holds the title of "Ekerin Iyalode of Ibadanland", a traditional chieftaincy position in her homeland. She is married to Chief Adebayo Akande, a business magnate and owner of Splash FM, Ibadan with whom she has children.

On 1 November 2014, Nike celebrated her 70th birthday. The event was organized at the Eko Hotels and Suites with notable business moguls and politicians in attendance including former Governor of Lagos State, Babatunde Fashola and Ogun State Governor Ibikunle Amosun.

== Bibliography ==
- Nike Akande (1996). A Bibliography on Family Support Programme. Edo State University.
