= Eyitayo Lambo =

Nigerian politician

Prof. Eyitayo Lambo

Minister of Health
- In office July 2003 – May 2007
- President: Olusegun Obasanjo
- Preceded by: ABC Nwosu
- Succeeded by: Adenike Grange

Personal details
- Born: 28 December 1944 (age 81)
- Profession: Lecturer, Health Economist, Technocrat, Civil Servant, Consultant

Eyitayo Lambo was appointed the Nigerian Federal Minister of Health in July 2003, holding office until May 2007 during the second term of the presidency of Olusegun Obasanjo.

== Background ==
Lambo was born on 28 December 1944 in Isanlu, the headquarters of Yagba East local government area in Kogi State, Nigeria. He attended the University of Ibadan, University of Rochester (USA) and University of Lancaster (UK).

He earned B.Sc. and M.A. degrees in economics and a Ph.D. degree in operational research applied to health systems. Professor Lambo taught at the undergraduate and graduate levels in the Universities of Ibadan, Ilorin and Bendel State, 1974 to 1992.

He was elected a Fellow for Operational Research (England), one of the first Africans so honored by that international professional organization in 1986. He was a consultant lecturer to the Administrative Staff College of Nigeria, the Nigerian Industrial Development Bank and the African Development Bank.

He was also external examiner to several Universities, including the City University of London.

Lambo was the Regional Adviser for health sector reforms, health care financing and health in socioeconomic development in the World Health Organization's regional office for Africa from 1990 to 1999.

He was the first economist to be employed by the WHO's Regional Office for Africa. He introduced health economics into the work of the WHO in Africa and built/strengthened capacity in health economics in the WHO Regional Office for Africa as well as in WHO country offices in Africa before taking an early and voluntary retirement from the United Nations System in 1999. At the Regional Committee of the Ministers of Health of the African Region held in Windhoek, Namibia in 1999, he received the award of the "most hardworking staff" in the WHO Regional Office for Africa.

He was Director of the Change Agent (for Health Sector Reform) Program in Nigeria (a sister program to PATHS I) funded by the Department for International Development (DFID), UK with the Federal Government of Nigeria from October 2001 to July 2003.

Professor Lambo has published over sixty papers, articles and books in the areas of quantitative economics, modeling, operations research applied to health, strategic management, and health economics.

== Minister of Health ==
In July 2003, Lambo was appointed Minister of Health of the Federal Republic of Nigeria, holding office until May 2007, making him the only economist appointed as Minister of Health in Nigeria to date and the second longest serving Minister of Health in Nigeria to date. During his tenure as Minister of Health, the first Health Sector Reform Program for Nigeria was developed and implemented; the National Health Insurance Scheme was launched after being on the drawing board for forty years. Many health policies and legislations were formulated during his tenure, including the hotly debated National Health Bill.

He was one of the few politically neutral technocrats to serve under the administration. He had a strong focus on long term health sector reform and good governance.

== Nigerian Economic Society Fellowship Conferment ==
On September 17, 2013, Lambo was conferred with a Fellowship by the Nigerian Economic Society (NES) along with Dr. Ngozi Okonjo-Iweala in the presence of the President of the Federal Republic of Nigeria, Dr. Goodluck Ebele Jonathan, GCFR and the President of the Nigerian Economic Society (NES), Professor Akin Iwayemi.

== Other activities ==
- Roll Back Malaria Partnership, Chairman of the Board (2005-2007)
- Medicines for Malaria Venture (MVV), Member of the Board of Directors (2003-2009)

== Selected bibliography ==
- Eyitayo Lambo and Mrs. H. B. Laoye (June 1983). "An Optimization-Simulation Model of a Rural Health Center in Nigeria". Interfaces. 13 (3): 29–35. doi:10.1287/inte.13.3.29.
- Allison Beattie, ed. (1998). "4 Aims and Performance of Prepayment Schemes". Sustainable health care financing in Southern Africa: papers from an EDI health policy seminar held in Johannesburg, South Africa, June 1996, Volume 434. World Bank Publications. ISBN 0-8213-4145-6.
- O. A. Adeyemo; Eddy Chicka Ndekwu (1990). "10 Scenario Planning and Analysis". Readings in public expenditure programming in Nigeria. National Centre for Economic Management and Administration. ISBN 978-2785-00-8.
- Eyitayo Lambo (2003). Resource mobilization for an expanded and comprehensive response to HIV/AIDS and its implications: a background paper for the Inter-Ministerial Task Force Meeting of the Health and Finance Ministers of East, Central, and Southern Africa Region. Commonwealth Regional Health Community Secretariat.
