= Queen's School, Ibadan =

Location
- Ibadan, Oyo State; Nigeria
- Coordinates: 7.37800482°N 3.94678908°E

Information
- Type: Secondary school
- Motto: Pass On The Torch
- Established: 1952
- Gender: Female
- Colors: Blue and White

Queen's School, Ibadan is an all-girls secondary school located in Ibadan, the capital of Oyo State, South-Western Nigeria.

== History ==
Queen's School, Ibadan was established in January 1952. It originated from Queen's College Lagos and was officially opened on 16 February 1952 with about 161 pupils . Queen's school was initially in Ede until it relocated to Ibadan in April, 1967.

Queen's School, Ibadan in honor of the Coronation of Queen Elizabeth II to the throne. With a few selected pioneering students from Queen's College, Lagos, school activities started with four teachers and the principal. In addition to their studies, girls were taught practical skills like sewing, cooking, and gardening. They actively participated in diverse activities, including dance, singing, sports, drama, Girl Guides, Literary and Debating Societies, and phonetics classes. This holistic approach aimed to groom well-rounded women, evident in the notable achievements of alumnae who excelled in various fields, such as medicine, professorship, engineering, leadership roles, law, and judiciary, showcasing the school's impactful influence on its graduates.

The academic facilities, arranged around a grass oval, included the Assembly Hall and a library with parquet flooring. Laboratories for physics, chemistry, and biology, classrooms, domestic science rooms, geography facilities, and staff rooms completed the campus layout.

== Donation ==
In March 2022, Oyo state Governor, Engineer Seyi Makinde donated a sum of 10 million naira to the school to fast track the on-going project in the school.

== SickBay/Building donation ==
In March 2023, the alumni group of Queen's School in Apata, Ibadan, from the classes of 1985 and 1991, inaugurated and presented a recently donated well-equipped Sick Bay to the school on Friday.The President expressed that the initiative was driven by the importance of maintaining both physical and mental well-being for the students in order to be able to focus on their studies, she further stated that the project costs millions and it serves as a commitment to ensuring the health and safety of the female students.

=== Building commission ===
On 21 May 2022, The alumni of Queens College with the aim of commemorating the late Ebola heroine, Dr. Ameyo Stella Adadevoh, who graduated from the Queen's School, in the years 1969–1973, the Queen's School Ede/Ibadan Old Girl's Association (QSOGA) is ready to unveil The building project in her honor. This building project is scheduled for commissioning at Queen's School Ibadan in Oyo state Nigeria.

== Attempted kidnapping ==
On 25 November 2022, there was a kidnap attempt at the school boarding house at 1 am. The attempt was foiled by the security man of the school. The governor of the state Seyi Makinde urged the police to make all things to be in order and investigate the incidence.

== Past principals ==
- Miss Hobson — 1952–1954
- Mrs. I. Dickinson — 1957–1958
- Mrs. R.M. Dunn — 1963–1967
- Mrs. C.F. Oredugba — 1958–1962, 1968-1970
- Late Mrs. T.A.O. Lawore — 1970–1972
- Mrs. C.O. Ogunbiyi — 1975–1976
- Mrs. O.F. Ifaturoti — 1976–1977
- Mrs. Oyinkan Ayoola — 1972–1975, 1980–1984
- Mrs. T. Fajola — 1978–1980, 1990–1991
- Mrs. E.O. Falobi — 1984–1987
- Mrs. B.M. Ajayi — 1987–1989
- Mrs. A.T. Olofin — 1992–1995
- Mrs. Remi Lasekan-Osunsanya — 1991–1992, 1995–1997
- Mrs. A.T. Olofin — 1997–2004
- Mrs. Ajani — 2004
- Mrs Fatoki
- Mrs Fatoba- 2015-2019
- Mrs B.T.Oyintiloye- 2020–present

== Notable alumni ==
- Nike Akande
- Olusola Obada
- Grace Oladunni Taylor
- Ameyo Adadevoh
- Toyin Sanni, Nigerian CEO

== Notable faculty ==
- Grace Alele Williams
- Grace Alele Williams is one of the notable alumni of the school. She was the first female Vice-chancellor in Nigeria and also the first female Mathematics Professor.
