= Abayomi Ajayi =

Nigerian obstetrician/gynecologist (born 1961)

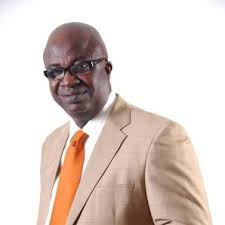
- Born: March 16, 1961 (age 65); Lagos, Nigeria
- Education: University of Lagos
- Occupations: Consultant obstetrician and gynecologist
- Known for: Fertility, assisted reproductive technology, reproductive health
- Website: www.abayomiajayi.com.ng

Dr. Abayomi Ajayi (born March 16, 1961) is a Nigerian obstetrician/gynecologist.

== Early life and education ==
Ajayi was born in Lagos, Nigeria and lost his parents at a very tender age.

He attended CMS Grammar School, Lagos from 1973 to 1978, and then graduated from the College of Medicine, University of Lagos in 1984. He completed his postgraduate training at the University College Hospital, Ibadan in 1994 with the fellowship of the West African College of Surgeons in Obstetrics and Gynecology. He received training in in-vitro fertilization at the Iscare Centre for Assisted Reproduction, Bratislava, Slovak Republic as well as the Institute of Human Reproduction Symbion, Fruebjerguej (a research center) and the Fertility Clinic of Copenhagen University, Herlev Hospital, both in Copenhagen, Denmark. He is also an Alumnus of the Stanford University's SEED institute for innovation in developing economies .

== Career ==
Ajayi joined the services of Lagoon Hospital, Lagos as a consultant in Obstetrics & Gynecology in February 1995 and held this position till October 2002, when he left to start Nordica Fertility Centre, Lagos. During his stay at Lagoon Hospital, he was appointed the coordinator of the out-patient services of the hospital. He also served as the part-time consultant to many clinics and organisations which include Chevron/Texaco Nigeria Plc, Lagos. He is the Managing Director & Chief executive Officer of Nordica Fertility Centre, Lagos which pioneered the Intracytoplasmic Morphologically Selected Injection (IMSI) in Nigeria; the clinic specializes in in-vitro fertilization and treatment of infertility. He is the country's representative of obgyn.net (an international network of obstetricians and gynecologist.

== Professional memberships ==
Ajayi is a member of:

- Nigerian Medical Association
- Society of Obstetrics and Gynaecologists of Nigeria
- American Society for Reproductive Medicine
- America Association for Gynaecological Laparoscopy
- International Society for Gynecological Endoscopy
- American Society of Liposuction Surgery
- American Academy of Cosmetic Surgery
- Advancement of Gynaecology Endoscopy of Nigeria
- Advancement of Gynaecology Endoscopy of Nigeria

He is also a board member of the International Society for In-Vitro Fertilisation.

== Mentoring programme ==
In November 2019, Dr Abayomi Ajayi launched a Physicians Mentoring Programme for young medical professionals to tackle the high rate of brain drain in Nigeria's health sector. Other mentors in the programme include Chief (Mrs) Nike Akande, Prof. Olanrewaju Fagbohun.

== Radio and print media ==
Ajayi is the country representative for Endometriosis Support Group. He has appeared on numerous television and radio programs. He has also appeared on different television and radio channels talking and educating people about infertility. Abayomi is an advocate for helping couples with infertility and speaks on the topic on the programme Nordica Fertility Center on STV today.

== Social media ==
Ajayi hosts a bi-weekly 30 minute long live interactive session on Facebook & Instagram where he talks about fertility related issues.

== Honors ==
Ajayi has received the "Endo Hero of the year -2016" from Endo March Worldwide among other notable awards. He is also a member of several organisations including the Commonwealth Medical Association Trust (COMMAT) & Council of Healthcare Advisors of the Gerson Lerman Group.

== Causes ==
Ajayi is the founder of the Fertility Treatment Support Foundation (FTSF) which provides free fertility treatment for financially restrained couples battling infertility. He is also the founder of Endometriosis Support Group Nigeria (ESGN) & Fertility Awareness Advocacy Initiative (FAAI).

== Academic works ==
- A.B. Ajayi, I.A.Babarinsa and I.F. Adewole: Maternal height and prior vaginal delivery as predictive factors in the trial of labour after on Caesarean Section. Journal of Obstetrics and Gynaecology (1997), 17(6):545 – 47
- A.B. Ajayi, I.A. Babarinsa and I. F. Adewole: Daycare diagnostic Laparoscopy in Infertility evaluation. Nig. Qtr J Hosp. Med. (1998) 8(4): 288 – 290
- I.A. Babrinsa, A. B. Ajayi and A. Aeleye: Coitally related morbidities in the non-pregnant female. West African Journal of Medicine (1995), 14(3): 141-6
- I.F. Adewole, I.A. Babarinsa, and A.B. Ajayi: A comparative study of Dilapan hygroscopic cervical dilator and Foley's catheter in pre-induction cervical ripening. Tropical Journal of Obstetrics and Gynaecology (1996), 42-46
- I.A. Babarinsa, A.B. Ajayi, I.F. Adewole and J.A. Adeleye: Daycare Diagnostic Laparoscopy: Experience with first 1000 patients in a tropical Gynaecological Service. Gynaecological Endoscopy (1997), 6:273-76
- A.B. Ajayi: Problems of adolescent fertility in Africa. Proceedings of 10th CAMAS Congress (1994); 81 –84 held at the conference hall, African Development Bank, Abidjan Ivory Coast (12th –17th Sept. 1994)
- I.A. Babarinsa, I.F. Adewole and A.B. Ajayi: Church-based Confinement services in Ibadan Nigeria. A significant factor in maternal mortality? Proceedings of 10th CAMAS Congress (1994); 55-70
- A.B. Ajayi, O. Biobaku, V. Ajayi, I. Oyetunji, H. Aikhuele, B.M. Afolabi : Detection of Intrauterine Lesions by Hysteroscopy among Women with Fertility Challenges in an In-Vitro Fertilization Center in Lagos, Nigeria (2015)
- A.B. Ajayi, O. Biobaku, V. Ajayi, I. Oyetunji, H. Aikhuele, B.M. Afolabi : Pattern of Congenital Uterine Anomalies among Infertile Women With and Without Recurrent Miscarriages, in Southwest Nigeria (2015)
- A.B. Ajayi, O. Biobaku, V. Ajayi, I. Oyetunji, H. Aikhuele, B.M. Afolabi : Pattern of Congenital Uterine Anomalies Among Infertile Women in Southwest Nigeria (2015)
- Ajayi is the co-author of several publications in credible medical journals. He has several published articles in several online newspapers.
