= Rena Lee =

Singaporean ambassador

Her Excellency Rena Lee
- 陈惠菁
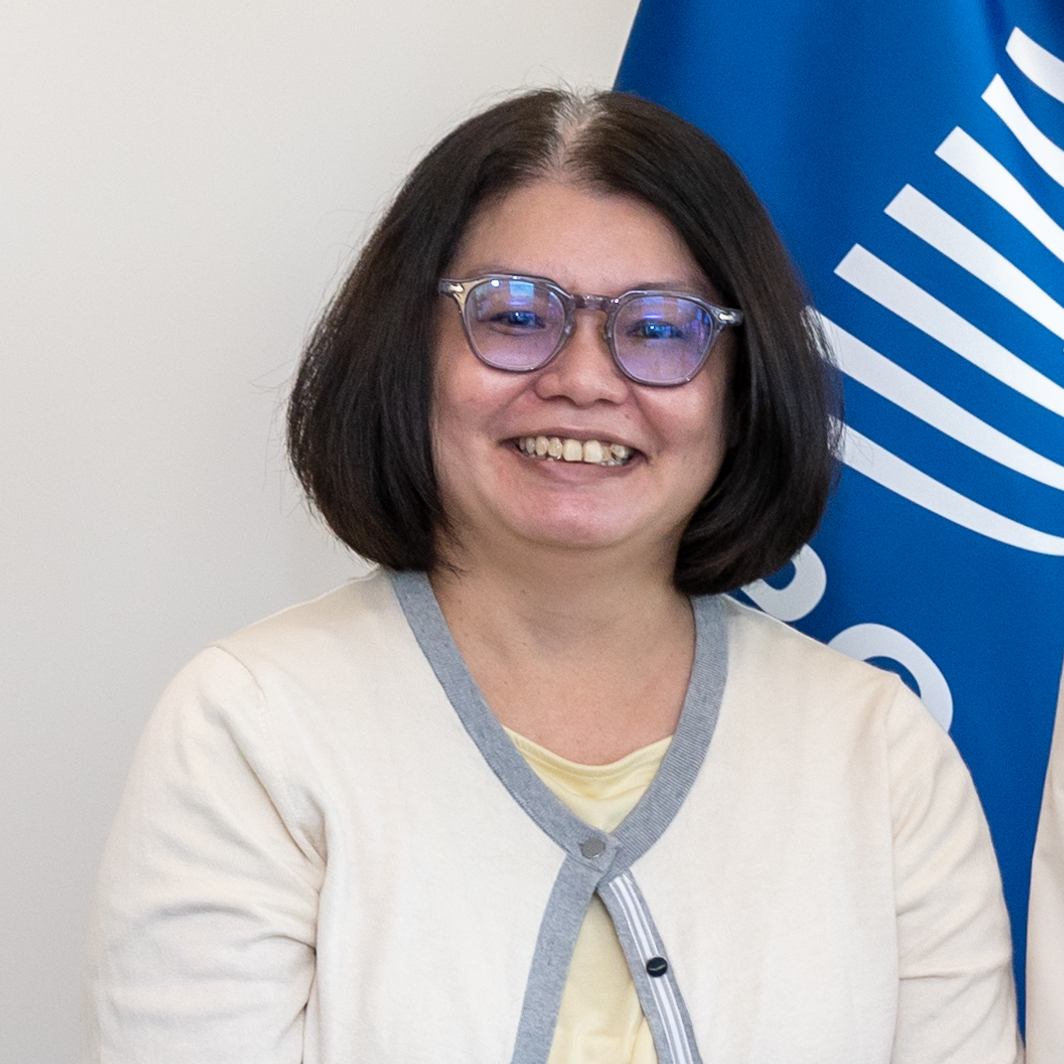
- Lee in 2022

Judge of the International Court of Justice
- In office 6 February 2027 – 2036

Ambassador for International Law of the Ministry of Foreign Affairs
- Incumbent
- Assumed office 2023

Registrar of Designs for the Intellectual Property Office of Singapore
- In office 1 August 2023 – 28 February 2025

Chief Executive, Intellectual Property Office of Singapore
- In office 1 August 2020 – 28 February 2025
- Preceded by: Daren Tang
- Succeeded by: Tan Kong Hwee

Ambassador for Oceans and Law of the Sea Issues and Special Envoy of the Minister for Foreign Affairs
- In office September 2018 – 2023

Personal details
- Born: Tan Hui Ching Rena; 28 July 1969 (age 57) Singapore
- Education: National University of Singapore (LL.M.)
- Occupation: Diplomat, International Law Practitioner, Civil Servant
- Known for: Leadership in UN High Seas Treaty negotiations; inclusion in Time 100 most influential people 2024
- Awards: Time 100 (2024)

Rena Lee (born Tan Hui Ching Rena (Note: Chinese: 陈惠菁; pinyin: Chén Huìjīng; Also known as Li-Chen Huijing (Chinese: 李陈惠菁) respectively for other venues in Mainland China.) on 28 July 1969) is Singapore's ambassador for International Law, former ambassador for oceans and Law of the Sea issues, and former special envoy of the Minister for Foreign Affairs. She was appointed as new chief executive of the Intellectual Property Office of Singapore (IPOS) in 2020, having taken over from Daren Tang. She was included in the Leaders category of Time magazine's 2024 list of the 100 most influential people for her chairing of successful final negotiations, leading to an agreed text for the first international agreement under the United Nations Convention on the Law of the Sea (UNCLOS), on the Conservation and Sustainable Use of Marine Biological Diversity of Areas Beyond National Jurisdiction (BBNJ) more simply known as the High Seas Treaty.

In 2026, Lee was elected to the International Court of Justice.

== Education and career ==
Lee graduated with a master’s degree in law from the National University of Singapore in 1998. She joined the Singapore Ministry of Defence in 1992 and began her practice of international law. She joined the Bar in 1993 and the Singapore attorney general’s chambers in 2008. She is a member of the Legal and Technical Commission of the International Seabed Authority and was Minister-Counsellor at the Hague Diplomatic Office of Singapore in the Netherlands.

Lee was elected president of the UN Intergovernmental Conference on the High Seas Treaty or BBNJ agreement in 2018. Discussions had started in 2004 with formal talks following for many years thereafter. The high seas, which cover almost half of the planet, start where the borders of countries’ exclusive economic zones, up to 200 nautical miles from coastlines and continental shelves, end. The high seas therefore do not fall under the jurisdiction of any country.

The final negotiations of the High Seas treaty were lengthy but successful. As recognition of her careful, firm diplomacy with representatives of 193 nations, Lee was included in the 2024 Time magazine list of the 100 most influential people. The treaty is seen as an important first step towards conserving 30 per cent of the world's land and sea by 2030, a goal set as part of 30 by 30 in December 2023.

In 2026, Lee became one of the five elected members of the International Court of Justice (ICJ). She was the first female judge from Southeast Asia to have served on the court.
