= Frederick M. Abbott =

American legal academic (born 1952)

- Born: 1952 (age 73–74)
- Occupation: Legal scholar

Academic background
- Education: University of California, Berkeley (BA, LLM); Yale Law School (JD)

Frederick M. Abbott (born 1952) is an American legal academic who is active in scholarly and public policy discussion involving global intellectual property protections and economic law, especially access to medicine. He holds the Edward Ball Eminent Scholar at Florida State University College of Law.

He has written scores of journal articles, and his books include The International Intellectual Property System: Commentary and Materials (with Thomas Cottier and Francis Gurry) (1999), China in the World Trading System: Defining the Principles of Engagement (1998), Public Policy and Global Technological Integration (1997), and Law and Policy of Regional Integration (1995). His book on treaty-making, Parliamentary Participation in the Making and Operation of Treaties, edited with Stefan Riesenfeld, was awarded the American Society of International Law Certificate of Merit.
