= Adenike Grange =

Nigerian politician

Prof. Adenike Grange

Minister of Health
- In office 25 July 2007 – 26 March 2008
- President: Umaru Musa Yar'adua
- Preceded by: Prof.Eyitayo Lambo
- Succeeded by: Prof. Babatunde Osotimehin

Personal details
- Education: St Francis' College, Letchworth, United Kingdom; University of Saint Andrews, Scotland
- Occupation: Physician Politician Lecturer

Adenike Grange is a Nigerian professor of paediatrics, consultant, author and former Minister of Health. She was appointed on 25 July 2007, becoming Nigeria's first female Minister of Health. During her tenure, she worked to improve healthcare delivery, reduce maternal mortality and diseases among vulnerable groups. She was arrested on the orders of President Umaru Musa Yar'Adua over the handling of ₦300 million in unspent government funds. She was investigated by the Economic and Financial Crimes Commission (EFCC) and stood trial. She resigned from office on 26 March 2008.

== Background ==
Adenike Grange attended high school in Lagos and then at St. Francis' College, Letchworth in the United Kingdom. From 1958 to 1964 she studied medicine at the University of St Andrews in Scotland. She worked in Dudley Road Hospital in Birmingham before returning to Nigeria in 1965, where she continued working in Lagos hospitals. She returned to the UK in 1967 and became senior house officer (pediatrics) at the St Mary's Hospital for Children, and obtained a Diploma in Child Health in 1969. In 1971, she joined the Lagos University Teaching Hospital. In 1978, she became a lecturer at the College of Medicine, University of Lagos. She became a senior lecturer in 1981 and a professor in 1995.

Grange served as a consultant to the Federal Ministry of Health, WHO, UNICEF, UNFPA and USAID. She was WHO Adviser on the Reproductive Health Programme in Nigeria from 1993 to 1999. She is the author of over fifty scientific papers, mainly on diarrhoea and nutritional conditions in children. She served as president of the International Pediatric Association. ln her career, she became known as an advocate for improving children's health.

== Minister of Health ==
On 25 July 2007, Grange was appointed the Minister of Health of the Federal Republic of Nigeria, becoming the first female to hold the office.

On 9 November 2007, Grange delivered the Lancet Lecture at the UCL Centre for International Health & Development.

She stated, "There is enough in terms of knowledge initiatives, strategies, tools, drugs and treatment protocols to cure disease and prolong life, but the reality is that the systems designed to bring about these outcomes are inadequate at best or even non-existent which is a global problem". She described working in Nigeria to standardise approaches to health delivery and emulate best practice from other countries. Priorities included eradicating polio, controlling malaria, reducing maternal mortality, and reducing levels of disease in the most vulnerable groups.

In January 2008, at an event attended by the president's wife Turai Umar Musa Yar'Adua, Grange urged the first lady to draw national attention to the importance of the health related Millennium Development Goals. She called on the National Assembly to expedite passage of the national health bill, and called on the wives of state governors to push for laws to promote the women and children's well-being.

== Resignation and prosecution ==
In February 2008, Grange was arrested on the orders of President Umaru Yar'Adua over the handling of N300 millions of unspent funds in the 2007 budget and award. She was examined by the Economic and Financial Crimes Commission (EFCC). She claimed that she had been misadvised by her directors. The president had reportedly directed that all unspent money in the budget be returned but it was allegedly shared by officials of the Ministry of Health as bonuses. In March 2008, President Yar'Adua accepted the resignation of Grange.

In March 2008, the Nigerian Medical Association (NMA) expressed regret over the circumstances leading to Grange's resignation, and commended her integrity, commitment, and contributions to child healthcare, during her tenure at the Federal Ministry of Health.

In April 2008, an Abuja High Court ordered that she be remanded in the custody of the Economic and Financial Crimes Commission. Senator Iyabo Obasanjo-Bello, daughter of former president Olusegun Obasanjo, was also charged but did not appear in court.

In December 2009, a Court of Appeal sitting in Abuja gave a unanimous verdict ordering that Grange should not stand further trial. She was discharged from facing prosecution and all charges were quashed.

== Life after resignation ==
Grange returned to her work in maternal and child health, taking up the role of heading the Otunba Tunwase National Paediatric Centre, which she had helped to establish. The centre has since been handed over to the University College Hospital, Ibadan, as part of efforts to upgrade the hospital's standards. She introduced several development initiatives which have contributed to the hospital's growth, including the Local Health Insurance Scheme for residents of Ijebu Land who could not afford quality healthcare. Through this scheme, many people in the community were able to access the services of the hospital.

She has since remained active through the Global Alliance for Vaccines and Immunization and the Civil Society Platform on Health.

With the support of youth activist and development expert, Abayomi Mighty, she launched AdeGrange Child Foundation, an NGO focused on promoting the well-being of mothers and children through strategic advocacy programmes.
