= Yetunde Oni =

Nigerian banker and business executive

Managing Director/Chief Executive Officer Union Bank
- Incumbent
- Assumed office 10 January 2024
- Preceded by: Mudassir Amray

Personal details
- Education: University of Ibadan; Bangor University
- Profession: Banker

Yetunde Oni is a Nigerian banker, MD/CEO, Union Bank and the first female managing director and CEO at Standard Chartered Bank in Sierra Leone. On January 10, 2024, she was appointed managing director of Union Bank following the dissolution of the Board and Management of Union Bank, Keystone Bank, and Polaris Bank.

== Education ==
Oni graduated with a bachelor's degree in Economics from the University of Ibadan in 1991. She proceeded to Bangor University, where she graduated with an MBA in Business Administration. She also has an Executive Training at Oxford University in 2016.

== Career ==
She started her banking career at Prime Merchant Bank Treasury & Money Markets Group in 1991 and then joined Ecobank Nigeria between 1994 and 2005 as a Relationship manager. In January 2005, Oni joined Standard Chartered Bank Nigeria as a Senior Account Relationship Manager where she rose to become the head of local corporates in 2010 and in 2014 was appointed as the Managing Director & Country Head of their Commercial Banking unit in West Africa. She was also appointed as the first female managing director and chief executive officer at Standard Chartered Bank in Sierra Leone in January 2021 and in January 2024 was appointed as the managing director of Union Bank.

Oni is an associate member of WIMBIZ (Women in Management, Business, and Public Sector) and honorary member of the Chartered Institute of Bankers of Nigeria and Nigerian British Chamber of Commerce (NBCC).
