= Abayomi Mighty =

Youth ambassador to United Nations

Abayomi Rotimi Mighty
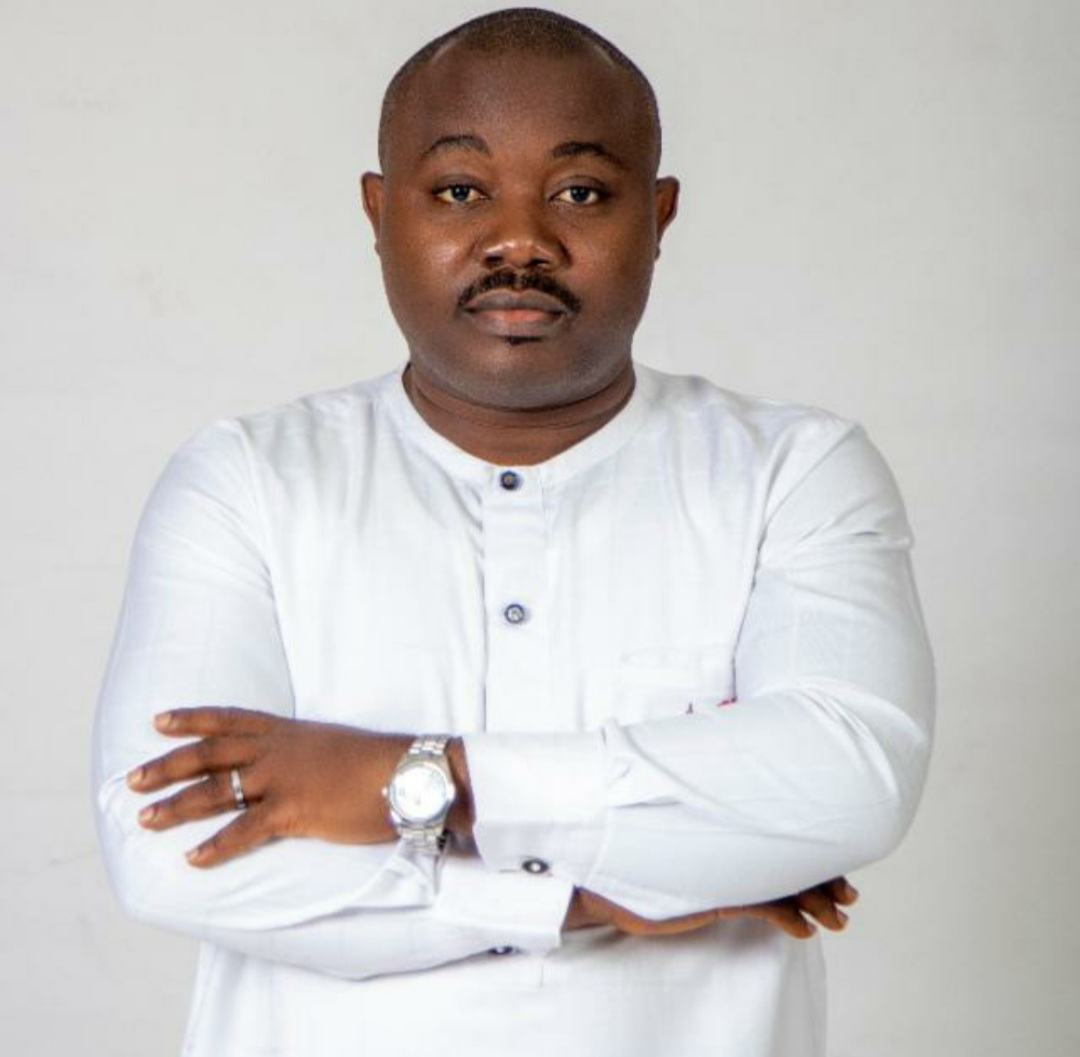
- Born: March 29, 1985 (age 41)
- Notable work: He has composed 1,217 songs and developed 987 stories ready to be told and scripted into films and novels.
- Awards: Global New Leader for Tomorrow Award by Crans Montana Forum, Monaco.

Abayomi Rotimi Mighty (born March 29, 1985) is a Nigerian youth ambassador to the United Nations. Mighty is the current National Youth Leader of the Nigerian Intervention Movement (NIM) led by Nigerian Human Right Activist Olisa Agbakoba. He is also a member of the National Steering Committee of the Coalition of United Political Parties (CUPP).

== Career and politics ==
At age 17, He was the United Nations (UN) African Youth Spokesperson at the African Leaders Summit on HIV/AIDS that produced the Abuja Declaration (2001) His speech played a role in the establishment and success of 'Youth Involvement Revolution' of the 21st century in Africa.

Abayomi is a Public Speaker and has author a book titled 'Things for Teens' and 'The Thumb Revolution'. He has composed 1,217 songs and developed 987 stories ready to be told and scripted into films and novels also writing a book about Damola Victor Ayegbayo about his artistic life circle title ' Art is life'. He served as Project Manager of Adegrange Child Foundation an NGO founded by Nigeria's Former Minister of Health Prof. Adenike Grange

Abayomi is Nigeria youth ambassador to the United Nations. He is currently the National Youth Leader of the Nigerian Intervention Movement (NIM) led by Olisa Agbakoba which has now formed Political alliance with People's Trust (PT) and he is also a member of the National Steering Committee of the Coalition of United Political Parties (CUPP).

== Awards ==
Global New Leader for Tomorrow Award by Crans Montana Forum, Monaco and Yessiey Awards.
