= Grace Alele-Williams =

Nigerian mathematician and academic (1932–2022)

Grace Alele-Williams OON, FMAN, FNAE
- Born: Grace Awani Alele; 16 December 1932; Warri, Western Region, Nigeria
- Died: 25 March 2022 (aged 89); Lagos, Nigeria
- Education: University of Ibadan (1954); University of Chicago (PhD, 1963)
- Spouse: Babatunde Abraham Williams (m. 1963; died 2010)
- Children: 5
- Scientific career
- Fields: mathematics education
- Workplaces: Queen's School; University of Ibadan; University of Vermont; University of Lagos
- Thesis: Dynamics Of Education In The Birth Of A New Nation: Case Study Of Nigeria. (1963)

Grace Awani Alele-Williams OON, FMAN, FNAE (16 December 1932 – 25 March 2022) was a Nigerian professor of mathematics education, who made history as the first Nigerian woman to receive a doctorate, and the first female vice-chancellor at any Nigerian university, at the University of Benin.

== Early life and education ==
Grace Awani Alele was born to Itsekiri parents in Warri, Western Region (present-day Delta State), Nigeria on 16 December 1932. She attended Government School, Warri, Queen's College, Lagos and the University College of Ibadan (now University of Ibadan). She obtained a master's degree in mathematics while teaching at Queen's School, Ede in Osun State in 1957 and her PhD degree in mathematics education at the University of Chicago (U.S.) in 1963, thereby making her the first Nigerian woman to be awarded a doctorate. Grace Alele was married later that year and became known as Grace Alele-Williams. She returned to Nigeria for a couple of years' postdoctoral work at the University of Ibadan before joining the University of Lagos in 1965.

== Career ==
Alele-Williams's teaching career started at Queen's School, Ede, Osun State, where she was a mathematics teacher from 1954 to 1957. She left for the University of Vermont to become a graduate assistant and later assistant professor. From 1963 to 1965, Alele-Williams was a postdoctoral research fellow, department (and institute) of education, University of Ibadan from where she was appointed a professor of mathematics at the University of Lagos in 1976.

She had a special interest in women's education. While spending a decade directing the institute of education, she introduced innovative non-degree programmes, allowing older women working as elementary school teachers to receive certificates. Alele-Williams always demonstrated concern for the access of female African students to scientific and technological subjects. Her interest in mathematics education was originally sparked by her stay in the US, which coincided with the Sputnik phenomenon. Working with the African Mathematics Program in Newton, Massachusetts, under the leadership of MIT professor Ted Martins, she participated in mathematics workshops held in various African cities from 1963 to 1975. Highlights included writing texts and correspondence courses covering basic concepts in mathematics working in concert with leading mathematicians and educators, such as the book Modern Mathematics Handbook for Teachers published in 1974. She taught at the University of Lagos from 1965 to 1985, and spent a decade directing the institute of education, which introduced innovative non-degree programmes, with many of the certificate recipients older women working as elementary school teachers. By serving in various committees and boards, Alele-Williams had made useful contributions in the development of education in Nigeria. She was chairman of the curriculum review committee, former Bendel State 1973–1979. From 1979 to 1985, she served as chairman of the Lagos State curriculum review committee and Lagos State examinations boards.

Alele-Williams was appointed vice-chancellor of the University of Benin in 1985, becoming the first female vice-chancellor of a Nigerian university and she believes her appointment, which ended in 1992, was "a test case to demonstrate a woman's executive capability".

Alele-Williams was a force for reform in the Dark Age for Nigeria's higher education in the 1980s. Then, the activities of secret cults, confraternities and societies had spread within the Nigerian universities, especially in University of Benin. She was able to make notable contributions.

After serving as the vice-chancellor of the University of Benin, she joined the board of directors of Chevron-Texaco Nigeria. She was also on the board of HIP asset management company limited, an asset management company in Lagos, Nigeria.

Alele-Williams was a member of governing council, UNESCO Institute of Education. She was also a consultant to the UNESCO and Institute of International Education Planning. For a decade (1963–73), she was a member of the African Mathematics Programme, located in Newton, Massachusetts, United States. She was vice-president of the World Organisation for Early Childhood Education and later president of the Nigeria chapter, and the first president of the African Mathematical Union Commission on Women in Mathematics.

She also served ten years (1993–2004) as regional vice-president for Africa of the Third World Organization for Women in Science.

== Personal life and death ==
Alele-Williams married Babatunde Abraham Williams (1932–2010) in December 1963, not long after returning to Nigeria from the United States. Williams was a political scientist who, at the time of their marriage, was a senior lecturer at the University of Ife, Osun State.

Alele-Williams had five children, and, as of 2017, ten grandchildren. She died on 25 March 2022 at the age of 89. The next day, the University of Benin flew the institution's flag at half-mast to mourn her death.

== Awards ==
Alele-Williams received several awards and honours. She received the Order of the Niger in 1987, and was elected a Fellow of the Mathematical Association of Nigeria and a Fellow of the Nigerian Academy of Education.

On 28 February 2014, she was one of 100 people to receive the Centenary Award, "a special recognition of unique contributions of Nigerians to the socio-cultural, economic and political development of the country in the last 100 years".

She is included in a deck of playing cards featuring notable women mathematicians published by the Association of Women in Mathematics.

== Publications ==
- "Dynamics of Curriculum Change in Mathematics" – Lagos State Modern Mathematics Project
- "Education of Women for National Development"
- "Report: The Entebbe Mathematics Project"
- "The development of a modern mathematics curriculum in Africa"
- "Education and Government in Northern Nigeria"
- "Education and Status of Nigerian Women"
- "Major Constraints to Women's Access to Higher Education in Africa"
- "The Politics of Administering a Nigerian University"
- "The Political Dilemma of Popular Education: An African Case"
