= Abuja Declaration (1989) =

Communiqué by Organisation of Islamic Cooperation

The Abuja Declaration is the name frequently given to the communiqué issued after the Islam in Africa conference held in Abuja, Nigeria between 24 and 28 November 1989. The conference was organised by the Organisation of Islamic Cooperation (OIC) (at that time called the Organisation of Islamic Conference) and it agreed to set up the Islam in Africa Organisation (IAO).

== Declaration ==
The declaration was to the effect that Muslims should unite throughout Africa, the curricula at "various educational establishments" should conform to Muslim ideas, the education of women should be attended to, the teaching of Arabic should be encouraged, and Muslims should support economic relations with Islamic areas worldwide. It noted that Muslims in Africa had been deprived of rights to be governed under sharia law and they should strengthen their struggle to reinstate it. The Islam in Africa Organisation was formally established in July 1991, also in Abuja and it has stated its objectives.

== Commentary ==
John Chesworth (director of Islam and Christian-Muslim relations at St Paul's United Theological College, Limuru, Kenya) and John Azumah (senior research fellow, Akrofi-Christaller Memorial Centre, Ghana) have reviewed the proceedings at the conference. On the decision to set up the IAO, Heather Deegan (senior lecturer in Comparative Politics, Middlesex University) has commented "More recently Islam has adopted a liberating posture, presenting itself as a religion which will rest countries from their neocolonial dependencies and ignoring the fact that it too was a conquering and colonising force in Africa over the longue durée." The East African Centre for Law and Justice reports the declaration verbatim but goes on to quote two other objectives which it says were omitted from the IAO website. It also severely criticises what it regards as the real objectives of the IAO.Raphael O Duru (Project Director, Voice Your Vote Nigeria, Nigeria)

== Alternative declaration ==
In 1990 another declaration was promulgated purporting to be from the 1989 conference and which Frans Wijsen (professor of World Christianity and Inter religious Relations at Radboud University Nijmegen) regards as a forgery because it does not correspond with declarations made at the conference. Regarding Africa, it said, amongst other things, that only Muslims should be appointed to strategic posts, non-Muslim religions should be eradicated, Nigeria should become a Federal Islamic Sultanate, and western law should be replaced with sharia. Wijsen regards this as indicating a more militant aspect of Islam in Africa and comments that some aspects directly conflict with official Islamic teaching.
