= Intellectual Property Office of Singapore =

Agency overview
- Formed: 1 April 2001; 25 years ago
- Jurisdiction: Government of Singapore
- Headquarters: 1 Paya Lebar Link, #11-03, PLQ 1, Paya Lebar Quarter, Singapore 408533
- Agency executives: Nicky Tan, Chairman; Tan Kong Hwee, Chief Executive
- Parent agency: Ministry of Law
- Website: www.ipos.gov.sg
- Agency ID: T08GB0023J

The Intellectual Property Office of Singapore (IPOS) is a statutory board under the Ministry of Law of the Government of Singapore. IPOS advises on and administers intellectual property (IP) laws, promotes IP awareness, and provides the infrastructure to facilitate the development of IP in Singapore.

IPOS has been an International Searching Authority (ISA) and International Preliminary Examining Authority (IPEA) under the Patent Cooperation Treaty (PCT) since 9 October 2015.

In 2024, then-Chief Executive, Rena Lee, was included in the Time magazine 2024 list of the 100 most influential people.

== Conventions ==
Singapore is a member of the following international conventions related to IP:

- Paris Convention
- Berne Convention for the Protection of Literary and Artistic Works
- Madrid Protocol
- Nice Agreement
- Patent Cooperation Treaty
- Budapest Treaty
- WIPO Copyright Treaty
- WIPO Performances and Phonograms Treaty
- International Convention for the Protection of New Varieties of Plants otherwise known as the "UPOV Convention"
- The Geneva Act (1999) of the Hague Agreement concerning the International Registration of Industrial Design
- Singapore Treaty on the Law of Trademarks

== Management ==
Chief Executive
Date	Name	Remarks
1 April 2001 - 31 May 2011	Liew Woon Yin	
1 June 2011 - 15 November 2015	Tan Yih San	
16 November 2015 - 31 July 2020	Daren Tang Heng Shim	
1 August 2020 - 28 February 2025	Rena Lee	
1 March 2025 - present	Tan Kong Hwee	

== See also ==
- List of patent offices
- You Wouldn't Steal a Car – anti-piracy public service announcement partly credited to IPOS, used from 2004 to 2008
