= Grace Oladunni Taylor =

Nigerian biochemist (1937-2025)

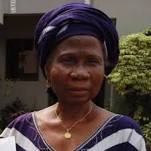
- Born: Grace Oladunni Lucia Olaniyan; 24 April 1937; Efon-Alaiye, Ekiti State, Nigeria
- Died: 8 July 2025 (aged 88)
- Other name: Oladunni Olaniyan-Taylor
- Occupation: Biochemist
- Years active: 1970–2004
- Spouse: Ajibola Taylor
- Awards: L'Oréal-UNESCO Awards for Women in Science

Grace Oladunni Taylor (also known as Grace Oladunni Lucia Olaniyan-Taylor; 1937-2025) was a biochemist, formerly at University of Ibadan, Nigeria. She was the second woman to be inducted into the Nigerian Academy of Science and the first African awarded a L'Oréal-UNESCO Award for Women in Science.

== Early life and education ==
Grace Oladunni Lucia Olaniyan was born in Efon-Alaiye, Ekiti State, Nigeria, to Elizabeth (née Olatoun) and R. A. W. Olaniyan. Between 1952 and 1956, she was a student of the Queen's School in Ede in the Osun State. She enrolled for her tertiary studies in 1957 at the Nigerian College of Arts and Science in Enugu and in 1959 transferred to the University College of Ibadan (now Ibadan University). Olaniyan graduated with honors in 1962 with a degree in chemistry.

== Career and research ==
Following completion of her degree, she immediately went to work at the Regional Agricultural Research Station (now the National Root Crops Research Institute) at Moor Plantation in Ibadan.

In 1963, she was hired as a research assistant in the department of chemical pathology at Ibadan University, and earned her doctorate in chemical pathology in 1969. In 1970, she was hired by the university as a lecturer and then in 1975, she served as a visiting research fellow at the Northwest Lipid Research Laboratory in Seattle, Washington. She returned to Ibadan University and was promoted to senior lecturer in 1975 and in 1979 promoted to reader. By 1979, when she began publishing, she had married Professor Ajibola Taylor. In 1980, she served as a visiting scientist at the metabolic research unit of the University of West Indies in Kingston, Jamaica and then in 1984, Taylor was promoted to full professor of chemical pathology at Ibadan University. That same year, she returned for a second research fellowship to the Northwest Lipid Research Laboratory in Seattle and also completed a posting as a visiting scientist in Port of Spain, Trinidad at the department of chemical pathology. In 1990, Taylor was hired as an associate professor at the University of Zimbabwe School of Medicine in Harare and taught in the department of pathology. In 1991, she returned to Ibadan University where from 1991 to 1994 she was head of the department of chemical pathology, and served as an honorary consultant at the University College Hospital, Ibadan. She retired in 2004 but continued to lecture at Ibadan in the department of chemical pathology.

Her specialty was the analysis of lipids in cardiovascular disease and her comparison of lipid metabolism confirmed that cholesterol levels are not a product of race, but rather diet and exercise levels. She was awarded numerous honors for her research, including the Shell-BP Scholarship in Chemistry, a World Health Organization Fellowship, the Fulbright–Hays Fellowship, a Ciba-Geigy Fellowship, and the Association of African Universities Fellowship. Taylor was inducted into the Nigerian Academy of Science in 1997, as the second woman to have ever been honored as an inductee. In 1998, the L'Oréal-UNESCO prize was launched to award one woman from each of five regions—Africa and Arab states, Asia-Pacific, Europe, Latin America, North America—for their scientific achievement and contributions to improving humanity. Taylor was the African recipient in the inaugural honorees of the L'Oréal-UNESCO Award for Women in Science, becoming the first African to receive the award. In 2012, she was honored by the Ekiti State Government for her contributions to mentoring and teaching medical students.

== Selected works ==
- Taylor, Grace Oladunni; Bamgboye, Afolabi E. (December 1979). "Serum cholesterol and diseases in Nigerians" (PDF). The American Journal of Clinical Nutrition. 32 (12): 2540–2545. doi:10.1093/ajcn/32.12.2540. PMID 506976.
- Taylor, G. Oladunni; Agbedana, E. O.; Johnson, A. O. K. (May 1982). "High-density-lipoprotein-cholesterol in protein–energy malnutrition". British Journal of Nutrition. 47 (3). The Nutrition Society: 489–494. doi:10.1079/BJN19820061. PMID 6805501.
- Taylor, Oladunni Grace; Ahaneku, Joseph Eberendu; Agbedana, Olu Emmanuel (October 1995). "Relationship between body mass index (BMI) and changes in plasma total and HDL-cholesterol levels during treatment of hypertension in African patients" (PDF). Acta Medica Okayama. 49 (5). Okayama University Medical School. ISSN 0386-300X. Archived from the original (PDF) on 2016-02-01.
- Taylor, Grace O.; Orimadegun, Bose E.; Anetor, John I.; Adedapo, Deborah A.; Onuegbu, Jude A.; Olisekodiaka, Japhet M. (July–September 2007). "Increased serum iron associated with coronary heart disease among Nigerian adults". Pakistan Journal of Medical Sciences. 23 (4). Professional Medical Publications: 518–522. ISSN 1681-715X.
- Taylor, Grace Oladunni; Ebesunun, Maria Onomhaguan; Agbedana, Emmanuel Oluyemi; Oladapo, Olulola O. (September–December 2013). "Variations in plasma lipids and lipoproteins among cardiovascular disease patients in South-western Nigerians". Biokemistri. 25 (2). Nigerian Society for Experimental Biology. ISSN 0795-8080.
- Taylor, G. O. (1971). Serum triglycerides and fatty acids in kwashiorkor. The American journal of clinical nutrition, 24(10), 1212–1215.
- Taylor, J. Communities of practice: A way of leading. Teaching and Learning, 40.
- Cheraskin, E. "If High Blood Cholesterol Is Bad—Is Low Good?." Journal of orthomolecular medicine 1.3 (1986): 176–183.
- Bock, U. (2000). The Institutionalization of Women's Studies at German Universities at the End of the Century. European Education, 32(4), 14–32.
