= Abayomi Barber =

Nigerian contemporary artist (1928–2021)

Abayomi Adebayo Barber (23 October 1928 - 26 December 2021) was a Nigerian contemporary artist who was the mentor of the Abayomi Barber Art School in Lagos, Nigeria. He is an important modern art figure in Nigeria but less well known in the Western World. He is best known for the application of naturalism and surrealism methods in his art works. Some of his signature works include life sized busts of former Nigerian president, Murtala Mohammed and the former Oba of Ile-Ife, Adesoji Aderemi, another famous work is an oil painting of Shehu Shagari.

== Life ==
Barber was born on 23 October 1928 in Ile-Ife to the family of Samuel Bamidele and Victoria Waleola Barber. He started his education at St Peter's Anglican School, Iremo, Ife. He finished his education at St Stephen's School, Modakeke, Ife in 1948. In 1949, he produced a carving on a wooden box and then participated in various art competitions during the same year. He gained recognition in Lagos when he won the Elder Dempster sponsored Lines Silver Cup for the best painting exhibited at the All Nigeria Festival of the Arts in 1952. After the prize, he was commissioned to create a portrait of Harold Cooper, the outgoing Ikoyi club president. He found employment in Lagos in the early 1950s as a graphic artist producing book and advertisement illustrations and comic drawings for the Nigerian advertiser located in Yaba, Lagos. In 1955, he briefly enrolled in a sculptor program at Yaba College of Technology under the direction of British sculptor Paul Mount. In 1957, he was introduced to Awolowo, then the premier of the Western Nigeria region by his uncle, Adesoji Aderemi; with Awolowo's contacts, he joined the Yoruba Historical Research Scheme on a research project tracing the origin of the Yoruba people. His work as a project assistant in the research scheme gave him the opportunity to work with notable scholars such as Saburi Biobaku, William Fagg, Frank Willet and Dr Bradburty. From 1960 to 1962, with a scholarship from the regional government, he studied at the Central School of Arts and Crafts, London. He went to London to study the preservation and restoration of antiquities and to work on developing a statue of Obafemi Awolowo. However, a regional crisis engulfed the region and his scholarship was terminated. While in England, he continued to develop his craft, he studied casting and molding at Mancini and Tozer studios, London, he also worked as an assistant at an art studio owned by Edward Delaney and later at Oscar Nemon's studio in St James studio in London. He worked with Nemon on five sculptures of Winston Churchill. He was also an assistant at the British Museum. He returned to Nigeria in 1971 and was employed as an arts fellow at the School of African and Asian Studies now known as the Center for Cultural Studies, University of Lagos. He was commissioned to paint a portrait of the visiting Ethiopian leader, Haile Selassie in 1972. When he returned to Nigeria, Barber was not pleased with what he viewed as the primitivism and expressionism that dominated the Nigerian art scene at the time. He believed that authentic creativity in the work of a genuine artist comes only through attention to skill and materials and sincerity of practice. He started an informal training school in 1973, with Muri Adejimi as his first student in his studio at the university.

Barber had his first solo exhibition in 1989, the title of the exhibition was Abayomi Barber A Retrospective. Some of his works are on display at the National Gallery of Modern Art including sculptures of Ali Maigoro and Yemoja.

Barber has continued to produce art. He was profiled in a mid-2017 article, where he discussed his life work and his philosophy on life.

Abayomi Barber died on 26 December 2021.
