= Serifatu Oladunni Oduguwa =

Nigerian singer and guitarist

Serifatu Oduguwa
- fair use image
- Born: Serifatu Oladunni Oduguwa; 1949; Noforija, Epe, Nigeria
- Died: 1978 (aged 28–29)
- Spouse: Gilbert Kayode Oduguwa
- Musical career
- Also known as: Queen Oladunni Decency
- Genres: Jùjú
- Occupations: singer, guitarist
- Instruments: vocals, guitar
- Years active: 1966 to 1978

Serifatu Oladunni Oduguwa (1949 – 1978), popularly known by her stagename Queen Oladunni Decency or Queen Mummy Juju, was a Nigerian singer and guitarist who specialized in the Jùjú genre of music. Regarded as the first female guitarist in Nigeria, she was the founder and leader of a Jùjú band called "Her Majesty Queen Oladunni Decency and Her Unity Orchestra". She recorded many hit songs until her death at the age of 28.
