= Murders of Oluwatoyin Salau and Victoria Sims =

Double-murder in 2020

- Location of Tallahassee in Leon County and the state of Florida
- Location: Tallahassee, Florida, U.S.
- Date: June 13, 2020; 6 years ago
- Attack type: Double-murder by ligature strangulation, rape, kidnapping
- Victim: Oluwatoyin Ruth "Toyin" Salau (aged 19); Victoria "Vicki" Sims (aged 75)
- Motive: Attempt to avoid arrest for previous sexual assault
- Accused: Aaron Lee Glee, Jr. (confessed)
- Charges: Premeditated first-degree murder (x2); Felony murder (x2); Kidnapping with intent to terrorize; Sexual battery
- Verdict: Life imprisonment

On June 13, 2020, two community activists local to the Tallahassee area, 19-year old Oluwatoyin Salau and 75-year old Victoria Sims, were found murdered in Tallahassee, Florida.

The suspect, Aaron Glee Jr., who was 49 at the time of the murders, was arrested and charged with first-degree murder and felony murder among other charges. He pleaded guilty to first-degree murder and kidnapping to avoid the death penalty, which the prosecution sought. Glee was sentenced to life in prison on September 22, 2023.

== Oluwatoyin Salau ==
Oluwatoyin Salau
- Salau in 2020
- Born: Oluwatoyin Ruth Salau; August 27, 2000; Tallahassee, Florida, U.S.
- Died: June 13, 2020 (aged 19); Tallahassee, Florida, U.S.
- Cause of death: Murder by ligature strangulation
- Resting place: Oakland Cemetery
- Education: Lincoln High School

Salau was born on August 27, 2000, in Tallahassee, Florida. She was Nigerian-American. A devout Christian, she was the youngest member of her church choir whilst growing up.

Salau attended Buck Lake Elementary School and Swift Creek Middle School in Tallahassee, and graduated from Lincoln High School in 2018. Following graduation, she studied cosmetology at Lively Technical College, simultaneously starting her business in hairdressing and modeling. In 2019, Salau enrolled at Tallahassee Community College while still at Lively, intending to study law at Florida A&M University thereafter.

Salau disappeared on Saturday, June 6, 2020, shortly after tweeting about being sexually assaulted. Salau was found murdered in Tallahassee, Florida, on Saturday, June 13, 2020, and her death was confirmed on Monday, June 15, 2020.

Salau was an active participant in the 2020 Black Lives Matter protests in Tallahassee, Florida, described as an "emerging leader" and "prominent voice" in the movement. She had advocated on behalf of Tony McDade in particular.

== Salau's disappearance and discovery of bodies ==
Oluwatoyin
(@virgingrltoyin)
tweeted:

Anyways I was molested in Tallahassee, Florida by a black man this morning at 5:30 on Richview and Park Ave. The man offered to give me a ride to find someplace to sleep and recollect my belongings from a church I refuged to a couple days back to escape unjust living conditions.

June 6, 2020

Shortly before her disappearance, on June 6, 2020, she tweeted that she was sexually assaulted by a black man after he offered to give her a ride back to a church where she sought refuge because of unjust living conditions. She was last seen alive on June 10, 2020.

After a search by community residents, the Tallahassee Community Action Committee, and Tallahassee Police Department, her body was found on June 14, 2020 around 9:15 pm local time near Monday Road in southeastern Tallahassee. Salau's body was discovered with that of Victoria Sims, a 75-year-old who had been active in local politics. Sims' home was found vandalized.

Salau was buried at Oakland Cemetery in Tallahassee.

== Accused ==
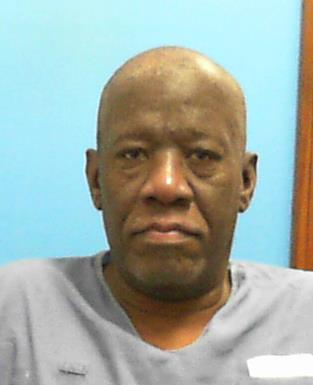
Aaron Glee Jr.

The suspect in Salau and Sims's deaths, Aaron Glee Jr., was arrested in Orlando, Florida during the early hours of June 14 and charged with murder and kidnapping. Glee later confessed to the murder and rape of Salau.

The bodies of Salau and Sims were found near his rental home in Tallahassee the night before. He had been arrested previously, less than a month prior, for aggravated battery after a police officer saw him kicking a woman in the stomach when she refused his sexual advances.

In January 2023, Glee rejected a proposed plea deal by the prosecution for a sentence of life in prison without the possibility of parole instead of the death penalty as they had originally sought. He later pleaded guilty to first-degree murder and kidnapping. On September 22, 2023, Glee was sentenced to life in prison.

== Reaction ==
''RIP Toyin'' and ''Toyin'' trended on Twitter alongside the hashtag #JusticeForToyin after the news went out that Salau's body had been found. Abike Dabiri, chairman of the Nigerians in Diaspora Commission called on the U.S. Government to ensure a thorough investigation of Salau's murder.

Nigerian American rapper, Wale, pays respect to Oluwatoyin at the end of his song "Shit Don't Stop". In the outro, the lyrics goes "We just lost a young Nigerian girl to some bullshit. Do better (Oluwatoyin), We together (Oluwatoyin), Won't Stop (Oluwatoyin)". The song was a part of his 2020 EP "The Imperfect Storm" that was released amidst the 2020 Black Lives Matter protests.

== See also ==
- List of kidnappings
- List of solved missing person cases (2020s)
