= Toyin Sanni =

Nigerian businessperson

Oluwatoyin Sanni
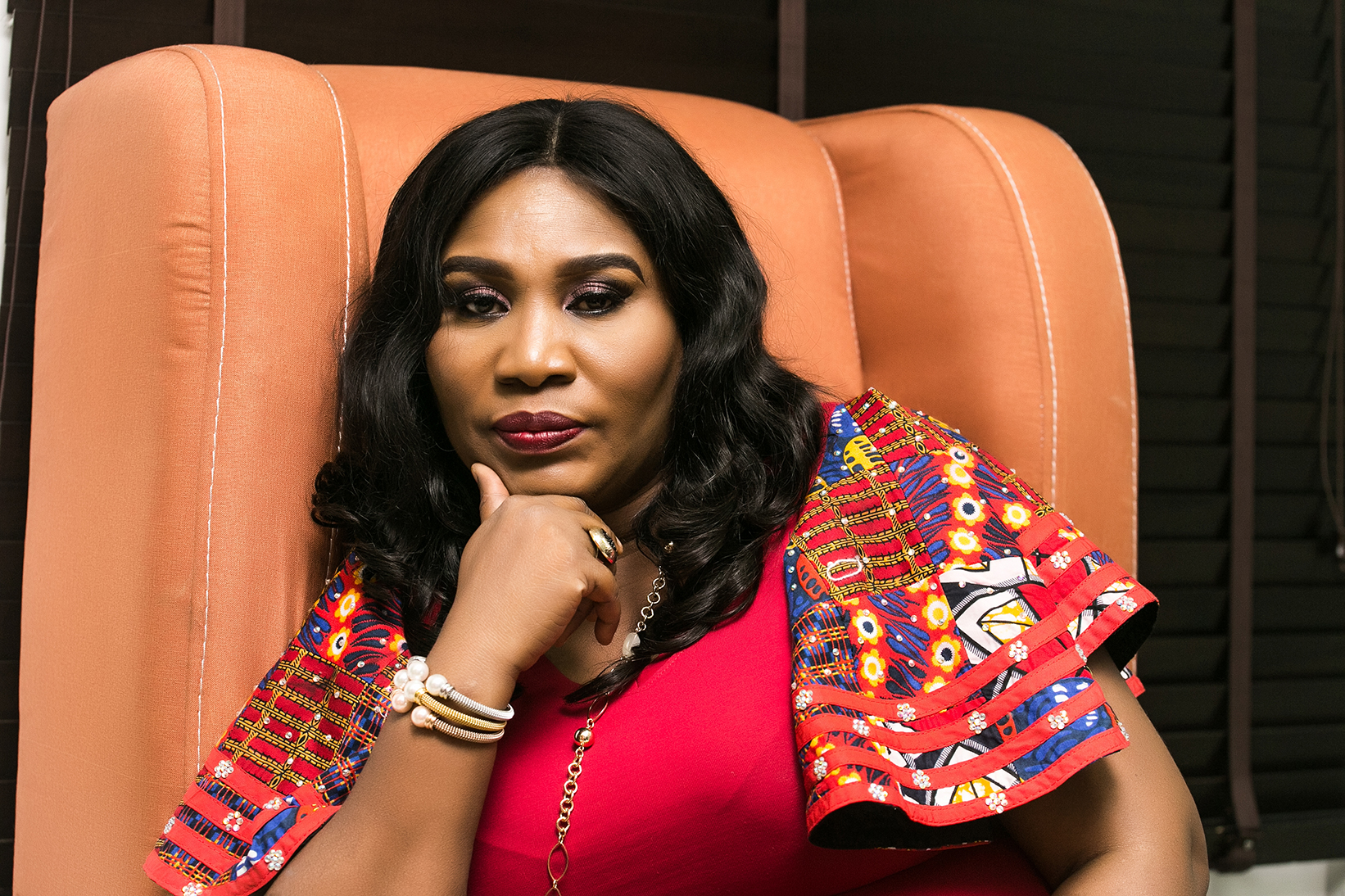
- Born: 10 September 1965 (age 61); Nigeria
- Education: Queen's School, Ibadan, University of Ife, University of Lagos, (Harvard Business School), (Lagos Business School Pan-Atlantic University), (IESE Business School)]
- Occupations: Investment Banker, Lawyer, Chartered Secretary, Stockbroker, and Author
- Known for: Founder/Group CEO at Emerging Africa Capital
- Children: Three
- Website: www.emergingafricagroup.com

Oluwatoyin Sanni or Toyin Sanni is a Nigerian investment banker, lawyer, chartered secretary, stockbroker, and author. In June 2018, she resigned from United Capital. where she was Group CEO for over four years and in July 2018, she became the CEO of Emerging Africa Capital

== Early life and education ==
Sanni was born in 1965 into a family of seven children. Her father was an accountant and her mother was in business. She has a strong Christian faith. She attended Queen's School, Ibadan then received a law degree from the University of Ife at the age of 18 (in 1984) after which she bagged a BL from the Nigerian Law School, Lagos. She later attended the University of Lagos where she got her master's degree. Sanni attended Harvard Business School Executive Education, Lagos Business School, Pan-Atlantic University CEO Program and IESE Business School Chief Executive Program.

== Awards ==
in 2017, Sanni received several awards, she won the All African Business Woman of the year, West-Africa and later All African Business Woman of the year, Africa at the CNBC Africa's AABLA awards in conjunction with Forbes Africa. Sanni won the Pearl Awards CEO of the Yearaward, making her the first woman to receive it the 22-year history of the award.

The Pearl Awards are given to Nigeria's leading companies and Sanni's company took five awards including the top award of "The Pearl" - Overall Best Company. The other four awards won were, CEO of the year, Corporate Governance award, Highest Dividend Yield and Sector award for Non-bank Financial services company.

Also in 2017 her daughter (Oluwatoni Sanni) graduated with a first class from the University of Bristol.

Her other awards include BusinessDay NSE Top 25 CEO Award British Award for African Development- BRAAD Award, HEIRS Person of the Year 2015, Women4Africa Award, Fellow, Chartered Institute of Stockbrokers, FCS amongst others.

== Roles ==
Sanni sits on the board of EAC Advisory Limited, EAC Trustees Limited, Emerging Africa Asset Management Limited, Trancsorp Plc, PEARL Awards and NEPAD Business Group Nigeria. She is an adviser to the micro banking company Mamamoni the company founded by Nkem Okocha. Sanni is in 2020 Chief Executive Officer of Emerging Africa Capital. She was the founder in 2016 and chairperson of Women in Finance ng (WIFng), a not for profit organization focused on advocacy for Nigerian women in the finance sector.

== Private life ==
Sanni got married when she was 25 and has three children with her husband.
