= Nkem Okocha =

Nigerian social entrepreneur

- Born: Lagos, Nigeria
- Education: Lagos State University
- Occupation: Social entrepreneur/activist
- Known for: Empowering women with financial aid

Nkem Okocha is a Nigerian social entrepreneur and activist who founded Mamamoni, a FinTech social enterprise that supports poor rural and urban slum women with free vocational skills and mobile loans.

She is the 2016 winner of the LEAP Africa Social Innovators Programme (SIP) by Union Bank of Nigeria.

== Early life and education ==
Okocha was born and raised in Lagos, Nigeria. She started her tertiary education at Auchi Polytechnic and later proceeded to Lagos State University where she earned a bachelor's degree in banking and finance and received a certificate in entrepreneurship from the Tony Elumelu Entrepreneurship Programme. She also has a certificate in business and entrepreneurship from Northwestern University.

== Career ==
Inspired by her widowed mum's struggle to feed and educate the family, she founded Mamamoni, a social enterprise that is addressing community transformation by helping women to carry on small businesses.

Since 2013, she has supported over 4,000 women in several rural/urban slum communities and given out over 100 micro-loans. Before starting her company, she worked as a customer service representative for Intercontinental Bank, now Access Bank plc. She went further to become the managing director at Novine Koncept Ventures before starting Mamamoni.
