= Snowy Khoza =

South African

Snowy Joyce Khoza
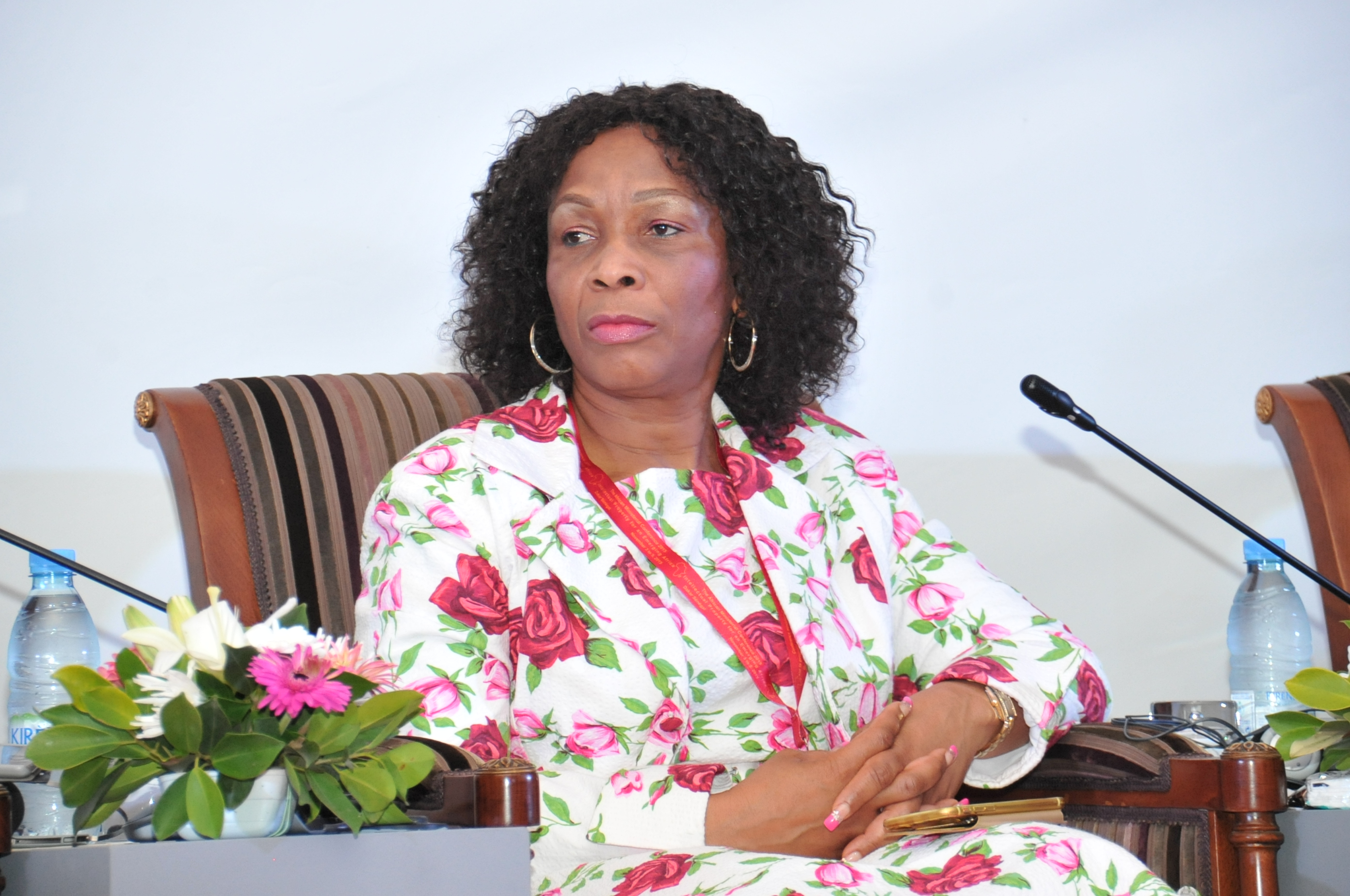
- in 2015
- Occupation: Group CEO
- Employer: Bigen Africa Group Holdings Pty Ltd
- Known for: Lead for Bigen Group

Snowy Joyce Khoza is a South African who is chief executive officer of Bigen Africa and President of Agape Christian Women.

== Education ==
She was educated at the University of Limpopo, University of Fort Hare, University of South Africa, University of Massachusetts and University of Cape Town.

== Relevant key positions ==
Khoza currently chairs the boards of ETION Ltd, SNOKHO Investments, and Ka-Manowi Manor Pty Ltd. She sits on the Advisory Boards of the University of Pretoria – Water Institute; and Ubank Group as independent non-executive director chairing its Human Capital and RemCo. She is the President of a not-for-profit Organization – Agape Christian Women's Network (ACWN International).

Khoza was the founding chair of Knowledge Management Africa while at the DBSA. She chaired the multi-billion Rand Trans Caledon Tunnel Authority (TCTA) and the Water Research Commission (WRC) as the first woman to fill these positions. Her other former chairmanships included chairing the Arts, Culture, Environment and National Heritage Distributing Agency of the National Lotteries Commission (NLC); the Centre for Social Development in South Africa at the University of Johannesburg; Family and Marriage Society of South Africa; Bihati Holdings (Pty) Ltd, Khayalabo Investments (Pty) Ltd, and Women's Development Business (WDB) Trust. Khoza was a member of the following boards: National Housing Financing Corporation (NHFC) Audit Committee and Chaired the Risk Committee; SekelaXabiso Audit firm, chairing its Audit and Risk committee; Statistics South Africa; and Freights Dynamics (Transnet). She has also served on the ministerial advisory panels for the then Ministry of Water and Forestry and Housing.

In 2016 she was promoted with the Bigen Group from CEO to executive chairperson in recognition of her delivery of the company's previous five-year plan. Her previous "right-hand man" Anton Boshoff took over her previous position.

In 2018 she was a judge in the All Africa Business Leader Awards.
