= Union Bank of Nigeria =

Commercial bank in Nigeria

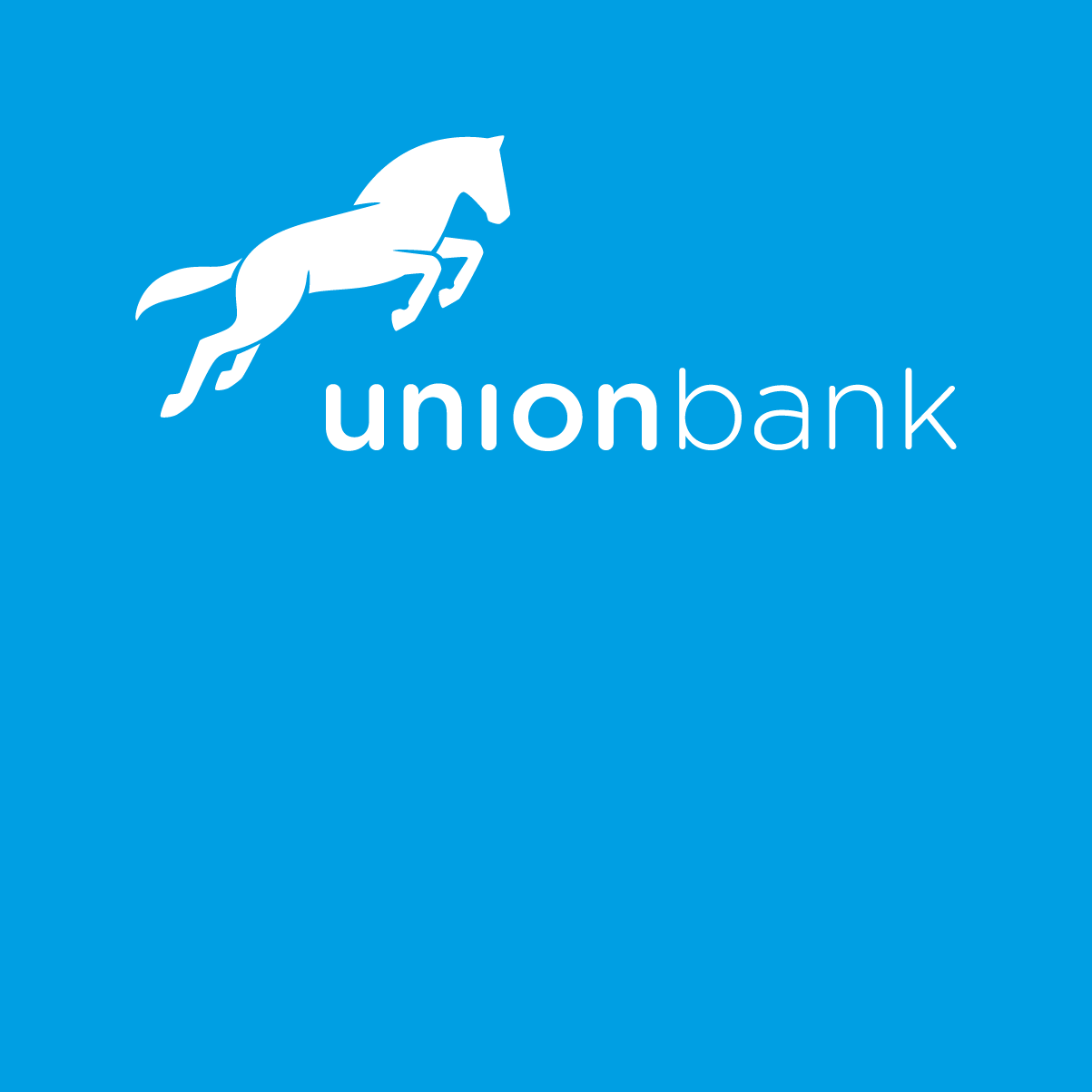
- Type: Private Company
- Industry: Financial services
- Founded: 1917
- Headquarters: 36 Marina, Lagos Island, Lagos, Lagos State, Nigeria
- Key people: Yetunde Oni; Chief Executive Officer Mr. Mannir Ringim; Executive Director Mr. Taiwo Shote; Executive Director Mr. Kelechi Nwaoba; Executive Director
- Products: Loans, Target Savings, UnionMobile, Agency Banking
- Total assets: US$6.3 billion (NGN2,793 billion) (2022)
- Number of employees: 2200
- Website: www.unionbankng.com

Union Bank of Nigeria Plc is a commercial bank in Nigeria headquartered in Marina, Lagos Island, Lagos. It has been operating in Nigeria since 1917.

== Overview ==
Union Bank is a commercial bank, serving individuals, small and medium-sized companies, as well as large corporations and organizations. In July 2009, it was rated the 556th largest bank in the world and the 14th largest bank in Africa. As of March 31, 2018, the bank's asset base was estimated at NGN1, 381 billion (US$4.1billion). The shareholders' equity at that time was estimated at NGN286 billion (US$851 million).

Union Bank of Nigeria's rich history can be traced to 1917, when it was first established as Colonial Bank.

In 1925, the bank became known as Barclays Bank DCO (Dominion, Colonial and Overseas), resulting from its acquisition by Barclays Bank. Following Nigeria's independence and the enactment of the Companies Act of 1968, the bank was incorporated as Barclays Bank of Nigeria Limited (BBNL, est. 1969).

Between 1971 and 1979, the bank went through a series of changes, including its listing on the NSE and share acquisitions/transfers driven by the Nigerian Enterprises Promotion Acts (1972 and 1977); this resulted in its evolution into a new wholly Nigerian-owned entity. To reflect the new ownership structure and in compliance with the Companies and Allied Matters Act of 1990, it assumed the name Union Bank of Nigeria Plc. (UBN "the Bank" or "Union Bank").

In 1993, in line with its privatisation/commercialisation drive, the Federal Government divested by selling its controlling shares (51.67%) to private investors. Thus, Union Bank became wholly owned by Nigerian citizens and organisations all within the private sector. During the Central Bank of Nigeria's (CBN) banking sector consolidation policy, Union Bank of Nigeria Plc acquired the former Universal Trust Bank Plc and Broad Bank Ltd. It absorbed its one-time subsidiary, Union Merchant Bank Ltd.

In compliance with CBN's Regulation 3, UBN divested all non-core banking subsidiaries in alignment with its core banking business model.

Following the banking crisis in 2009 and the intervention of the CBN via Asset Management Company of Nigeria (AMCON), the bank was recapitalised in 2012 with an injection of $500 million by Union Global Partners Limited (UGPL), a consortium of local and international investors. UGPL acquired 65% of the bank's shareholding, and in the last quarter of 2014, AMCON's remaining 20% stake in the bank was acquired by Atlas Mara.

In December 2021, the Bank announced that it had received a notification of an agreement by UGPL, Atlas Mara Limited and other majority shareholders to divest shareholding in Union Bank to Titan Trust Bank. Majority shareholders in Union Bank transferred an aggregate of 93.41% of the issued share capital of Union Bank held to Titan Bank. After receiving all regulatory approval, the transaction was completed in June 2022, and there was a subsequent change of control. Titan Trust Bank became the majority shareholder in Union Bank. (Titan Trust Bank is majority owned by the TGI Group, a conglomerate based in Nigeria).

The acquisition of the Shares triggered the statutory and regulatory requirement for Titan Trust Bank to execute a mandatory take-over offer (MTO) to the other shareholders of Union Bank in November 2022 and, subsequently, a squeeze out of minority shareholders through a scheme of arrangement in May 2023. Consequent to the acquisition of all the shares in Union Bank of Nigeria, an application to delist Union Bank of Nigeria Plc shares from the Nigerian Stock Exchange was filed, and the application was granted in November 2023.

Following a court-ordered meeting of shareholders on 28 December 2023 and subsequent sanctioning of the scheme, the official merger process between Union Bank of Nigeria and Titan Trust Bank was concluded, with Union Bank of Nigeria existing as the surviving entity.

== Ownership ==
Titan Trust Limited acquired 89.4 per cent interest in Union Bank from a pool of stakes from exiting major investors, including Atlas Mara and Union Global Partners Limited, but later upped the stake to 93.4 per cent.

== Branch network ==
The bank maintains a vast network of interconnected branches in all Nigerian states. It was listed as the tenth of the 10 biggest banks in Nigeria.

== Management ==
The bank's activities are supervised by the board of directors led by the Chairman, Bayo Adeleke alongside the Managing Director/ Chief Executive Officer, Yetunde Oni. Other sitting Executive Directors include Mannir Ringim, Taiwo Shote, and Kelechi Nwaoba.

The management team is led by Yetunde Oni, who is the CEO and Managing Director since January 2024.

== Awards ==
In 2022, the Global Finance Award for Best SME Bank in Nigeria.

== See also ==
- Economy of Nigeria
- List of banks in Nigeria
- Nkem Okocha
