= Abuja Declaration (2001) =

Pledge by African Union countries

The Abuja Declarations and Frameworks for Action on Roll Back Malaria was a pledge made in 2001 by members of the African Union during a conference in Abuja, Nigeria. In it, the member nations pledged to increase their health budget to at least 15% of the state's annual budget, and requested Western donor countries to increase their support. Tracking the progress of the efforts, the World Health Organization reported in 2010 that only one African country had reached that target, while 26 had increased health expenditures and 11 had reduced it. Nine others had not had a noticeable negative or positive trend.
