= African Centre of Excellence for Genomics of Infectious Diseases =

Infectious Disease Research Centre

- Founded: 2014
- Purpose: Public health
- Headquarters: Redeemer's University Nigeria
- Key people: Christian Happi
- Website: https://acegid.org/

The African Centre of Excellence for Genomics of Infectious Diseases (ACEGID), based at Redeemer's University, Ede, Nigeria, is a consortium of West African academic and medical institutions partnering for research and training.

== Background ==
ACEGID was founded in 2014, with initial funding for the program coming from the World Bank. The goal of the program is to serve as a center of excellence for research and training in genomics, with a focus on infectious disease. Professor Christian Happi is the Director and Principal Investigator of the centre.

== Consortium Members and Partners ==
The members of the consortium in Nigeria include Redeemer's University, Irrua Specialist Teaching Hospital, Irrua Edo State, Federal Medical Center, Owo, General Hospital Ikorodu, Lagos and Alex Ekueme Federal Teaching Hospital, Abakaliki. Regional consortium members include Kenema Government Hospital, Sierra Leone and Université Cheikh Anta Diop, Dakar (Senegal).

The centre works closely with national, regional and global public health institutions including the Nigeria Center for Disease Control (NCDC), the Africa Center for Disease Control and the World Health Organization, Harvard University, the Broad Institute of Harvard and Massachusetts Institute of Technology, Tulane University, The Scripps Institute, Walter Reed Army Institute of Research, University of Nebraska Medical Center and University of Cambridge. Private sector partners including Viral Hemorrhagic Fever Consortium, Illumina, Dimagi, Zalgen LLC, Fathom Inc, Microsoft and Access Bank PLC, Lagos, Nigeria.

== Education ==
ACEGID's Master of Science and Doctor of Philosophy degrees programs in Molecular Biology and Genomics are operated in conjunction with Redeemer's University's Department of Biological Sciences. The programs are accredited by AQAS.

== Research ==
ACEGID's research focusses on the use of advanced genomics tools and techniques for investigating infectious diseases, performing surveillance, developing diagnostics, drugs and vaccines, and providing information needed by public health institutions for evidence-based policy-making. The centre also works with partners to develop field-deployable infectious diseases diagnostics. Some of ACEGID's research projects include:

- Genomic characterization and surveillance of microbial threats in Africa
- Africa Higher Education Centers of Excellence for Development Impact (ACE Impact)
- Sentinel - a pandemic preemption and response system
- Combatting Antimicrobial Resistance in Africa Using Data Science (CAMRA)

== Funding ==
In addition to the World Bank funding through which the centre was founded, ACEGID has received research funding from various organizations including United States National Institutes of Health, Human Heredity and Health in Africa (H3 Africa), Wellcome Trust, and United Kingdom Biotechnology and Biological Sciences Research Council, the ELMA Philanthropies, Skoll Foundation, as well as the Bill and Melinda Gates Foundation, among others.

== Achievements and awards ==
ACEGID's accomplishments include:

- Diagnosis of the first Ebola case in Nigeria and Sierra Leone
- Developed 10-minutes rapid diagnostic test kit for Lassa fever
- Investigated the origins and evolution of Lassa fever
- Sequenced the first SARS-CoV-2 genome in Africa.
- Developed a COVID-19 vaccine candidate in collaboration with partners
- Uncovered the first rabbit haemorrhagic disease virus genome in Sub-Saharan Africa

In addition, ACEGID's work has received several national and international recognitions.

- Received the 2021 Nigeria Academy of Science Gold Medal Prize award.
- 2021 Al-Sumait Prize for African Development
- Won the Sterling Bank Most Outstanding Genomic Laboratory in Nigeria Award 2022
