= Adenuga =

- Gender: Male
- Language: Yoruba

Origin
- Origin: Nigeria
- Meaning: the crown, or royalty has a foundation or throne room
- Region of origin: Southwest Nigeria

Adénúgà audio is a surname of Yoruba origin, meaning "the crown or royalty has a foundation or throne room".

== Notable people with the surname include ==
- Jamie Adenuga, stage-named Jme (musician), English grime artist
- Joseph Adenuga, stage-named Skepta, English rapper
- Julie Adenuga, English radio presenter
- Mike Adenuga, Nigerian business tycoon
- Victor Adenuga Oyenuga, Nigerian agricultural scientist
- Wale Adenuga, Nigerian cartoonist
