= Oyenuga =

- Language: Yoruba

Origin
- Region of origin: West Africa

Oyenuga is a surname of Yoruba origin, commonly interpreted to mean “the title owns the palace,” symbolizing honor, prestige, and noble responsibility within traditional Yoruba culture.

Notable people with the surname include:

- Adey Oyenuga – Procurement Administrator at Chapman University
- Kudus Oyenuga – English professional footballer
- Victor Adenuga Oyenuga – Nigerian Professor Emeritus of Agricultural Science and pioneer President of the Nigerian Academy of Science
- Oyenuga Ridwan Timilehin – Nigerian tech entrepreneur, youth leader, and Founder & CEO of SereniMind, a leading mental health technology platform in Africa
