= Nigerian National Order of Merit Award =

Nigerian academic award

The Nigerian National Order of Merit Award (NNOM) is an academic award conferred on distinguished academicians and intellectuals who have made outstanding contributions to the academic, growth and development of Nigeria. The award is often conferred on its recipient by the Federal Government of Nigeria following a nomination and approval of the Governing Board of the Nigerian National Merit Award. Its recipient is often decorated by the President of Nigeria. Recipients of the award have the legal right to use the postnominal title: Nigerian National Order of Merit (NNOM). It is the highest academic award in Nigeria and since its institution in 1979, the award has so far been conferred on only 70 distinguished academicians.

== List of recipients ==
- Chinua Achebe
- Ekhaguere Godwin Osakpemwoya Samuel
- Done P. Dabale
- Adiele Afigbo
- Alexander Animalu
- David Aradeon
- Seth Sunday Ajayi
- J. P. Clark
- Lazarus Ekwueme
- Taslim Olawale Elias
- Etim Moses Essien
- Akpanoluo Ikpong Ikpong Ette
- Francis Idachaba
- Ladi Kwali
- Andrew Jonathan Nok
- Chukwuedu Nwokolo
- Tanure Ojaide
- Isidore Okpewho
- Niyi Osundare
- Lateef Akinola Salako
- Mabel Segun
- Wole Soyinka
- Oye Gureje
- Oyewale Tomori
- Bruce Onobrakpeya
- Tolu Olukayode Odugbemi
- Olufemi Obafemi
- Omowunmi Sadik
- Stella Ugbobuaku
