= Oluwole Olayiwola Amusan =

Nigerian academic

Oluwole Olayiwola Amusan is a Nigerian academic and incumbent Vice Chancellor of Adeleke University, a private university owned by Chief Adedeji Adeleke.
