= Ekhaguere Godwin Osakpemwoya Samuel =

Nigerian mathematician

Godwin Osakpemwoya Samuel Ekhaguere NNOM
- Born: 23 May 1947 (age 78); Benin City, Edo State, Nigeria
- Education: Immaculate Conception College; Imperial College of Science & Technology, London; University of London (Bedford College)
- Occupations: Researcher; academician; professor

Godwin Osakpemwoya Samuel Ekhaguere NNOM is a Nigerian professor of mathematics at the University of Ibadan and the founder and president of the International Centre for Mathematical & Computer Sciences (ICMCS). He was a Fellow of the Alexander von Humboldt Foundation, Germany, a former sub Dean of Faculty of Science University of Ibadan and is a member of the African Academy of Sciences. He is also a recipient of the Nigerian National Order of Merit (NNOM) which was conferred on him by President Muhammadu Buhari.

== Early life and education ==
Godwin, fondly called GOS, was born on 23 May 1947 in Benin City, Edo State, Nigeria. He obtained the West African School Certificate in 1965 and the Higher School Certificate in 1967, both at the Immaculate Conception College (ICC), Benin City. In 1971, he obtained his first degree in physics and earned the Diploma of Imperial College (DIC) at the Imperial College of Science & Technology (now Imperial College of Science, Technology & Medicine) London in Mathematical Physics in 1974. His supervisor was the future Emeritus Professor Robert Delbourgo. In 1976, he bagged his Ph.D. in Mathematical Physics from the University of London (Bedford College). His supervisor was the future Emeritus Professor Raymond Frederick Streater.

== Career ==
GOS became a professor in 1988 and the vice-president of the Nigerian Mathematical Society in 1995. From 1993 to 1996, he was the Head of the Department of mathematics and became the sub-dean of the faculty of science in 1981. Over the years, he occupied diverse visiting positions at multiple institutions around the world, some of which are: the Institute of Theoretical Physics, University of Göttingen, Göttingen, Germany; Institute of Theoretical Physics, University of Wroclaw, Poland; Forschungszentrum Bielefeld-Bochum-Stochastik (BiBoS), Universität Bielefeld, Germany; Sonderforschungsbereich 123 University of Heidelberg, Heidelberg, Germany; Arnold-Sommerfeld Institute for Mathematical Physics, Technical University of Clausthal-Zellerfeld, Germany; International Centre for Theoretical Physics, Trieste, Italy; Centro Matematica Vito Volterra, Università di Roma II (Tor Vergata), Rome, Italy; the Association of African Universities, Accra, Ghana and the University of the Western Cape, Bellville, Cape Town, South Africa. He is currently a Professor Emeritus of Mathematics at the University of Ibadan: a lifelong appointment. His autobiography, with the title: Promise and Providence, was published on September 23, 2022, by Safari Books Limited, Ibadan, Nigeria, and is available on multiple e-publishing platforms such as: Amazon, Barnes and Noble, Rakuten Kobo, Lulu.com, Weltbild, Hugendubel and the African Books Collective.
