= Lateef Akinola Salako =

Nigerian professor (1935–2017)

- Born: 5 July 1935; Lagos State, Nigeria
- Died: 8 December 2017 (aged 82)
- Occupations: educator; pharmacologist; therapeuticist
- Years active: 1935–2017
- Children: Noimot Salako-Oyedele (1966); Tayo Salako (1968); Babajide Salako (1970); Omolara Adetunji (1973)
- Awards: NNOM; CON; DSc (Sheffield)

Lateef Akinola Salako NNOM, CON (5 July 1935 – 8 December 2017) was a Nigerian academic who was professor emeritus of pharmacology and therapeutics at the University of Ibadan.

== Early life ==
Lateef Akinola Salako was born on 5 July 1935 in Lagos State, south-western Nigeria. He attended Methodist Boys' High School, Lagos, where he obtained the West African Senior School Certificate in 1953. He trained at the University College Hospital, Ibadan before he proceeded to University of Sheffield where he received a doctorate degree in 1969.

== Career ==
He began his career in 1962, at the University College Hospital, Ibadan where he rose to the position of Senior Registrar in 1965, and in 1966, he became a Medical Research Training Fellow, University of Ibadan. He was a Fellow in Clinical Pharmacology at the Department of Pharmacology and Therapeutics, University of Sheffield for two years, between 1967 and 1969. In 1969, he was appointed as Lecturer in Clinical Pharmacology, University of Ibadan, Ibadan where he rose to the position of senior lecturer in 1970, and in 1973, he was appointed a Professor of Clinical Pharmacology. In 1997, he was elected President of the Nigerian Academy of Science to succeed Professor Awele Maduemezia.

Salako died on December 8, 2017, at the age of 82.

== Awards and honor ==
- Ogun State Distinguished Citizen Award, (1990)
- Nigerian National Order of Merit Award (1992)
- Commander of the Order of Niger (2004)
