= Faddothegreat =

Nigerian magician (born 2000)

- Born: Ibitoye Kingfahd; 2 February 2000 (age 26); Lagos
- Education: Adeleke University
- Occupation: Stage magician
- Known for: Guinness World Records holder for Longest Magic Show by an Individual

Ibitoye Kingfahd (born 2 February 2000), known for his stage name as Faddothegreat is a Nigerian magician and illusionist who holds the Guinness World Record for Longest Magic Show by an Individual. He performed over 1,200 magic tricks non-stop for 50 hours, breaking the previous record of 30 hours and 45 minutes, which was set by Richard Smith from the United Kingdom in 2004.

== Education and career ==
Faddothegreat is a first-class Civil Engineering graduate from Adeleke University. He blends technical skill and artistic creativity to design many of the unique props used in his shows. He has had passion for magic for nearly a decade, and it has evolved from a hobby to redefining entertainment in Nigeria.

He is known for his engaging humour and captivating illusions. He has performed at major events such as Lagos Startup Week, Pulse Influencer Awards, Light Up Lagos and the Endeavour Tech Founders Networking Event.

== Guinness World Record ==
In November 2025, Faddothegreat announced that he will be attempting the Guinness World Record for the Longest Standalone Magic Performance, taking place from 27 to 29 November 2025, at Pop Landmark, Victoria Island, Lagos.

Faddo spent almost a year meticulously designing his own props and undergoing rigorous physical training to prepare for the 50-hour marathon, as the Guinness World Record rules stated he couldn't repeat any of the magic tricks within a four-hour window.

The event, which lasted for 3 days, drew thousands of spectators to the Landmark Centre, and FaddotheGreat captivated a live and global audience with over 1200 tricks, ranging from card manipulations to mentalism and large-scale stage illusions.

In February 2026, Fadoo was confirmed as the Guinness World Record holder for the longest magic show by an individual, with a 50-hour record.
