= Olaniyan =

- Gender: Male
- Language: Yoruba

Origin
- Origin: Nigeria
- Meaning: Wealth has a joyful carriage
- Region of origin: South western Nigeria

Other names
- Short form: Ola

Olaniyan audio is a Yoruba surname. Its meaning is "Wealth has a joyful carriage". It originated from the south western part of Nigeria. It's diminutive version includes "Ola", "Niyan".

Notable people with the name include:

- Rauf Olaniyan, Nigerian politician and engineer
- Tejumola Olaniyan, Nigerian academic
- Caleb Olaniyan, Nigerian zoologist
