= Debo =

Debo may refer to:

== People ==
- Debo Adedayo (born 1992), Nigerian comedian, actor, and activist, stage name Mr Macaroni
- Debo Adegbile (born 1966), American lawyer
- Debo Adeyewa, Nigerian academic, administrator and author
- Debo Prasad Barooah, Indian academician, author, historian and former university administrator
- Debo Ogundoyin (born 1987), Nigerian politician
- Debo Powers, American politician and former educator
- "Debo", nickname of Deborah Cavendish, Duchess of Devonshire (1920–2014), English aristocrat, writer, memoirist and socialite
- Angie Debo (1890–1988), American historian
- W. Alfred Debo (1877–1960), American football player and coach, lawyer and politician

== Other uses ==
- Lake Débo, Mali
- Débo Club de Mopti, a football club based in Mopti, Mali

== See also ==
- Debo Band
- Depok, a city of Indonesia, written as 德博 for Chinese Mandarin
- Deebo (disambiguation)
