= Judikay =

Nigerian gospel singer (born 1994)

- Born: Judith Kanayo; 26 October 1994 (age 31); Sango Otta, Ogun State, Nigeria
- Origin: Delta State
- Genres: Contemporary worship; contemporary gospel
- Occupations: Singer; songwriter; worship leader
- Instrument: Vocals
- Years active: 2013–present
- Label: Intimacy Records
- Spouse: Anselem Ikechukwu Opara
- Website: www.judikay.com

Judith Kanayo-Opara (born 26 October 1994), known professionally as Judikay, is a Nigerian gospel singer, songwriter and worship leader. She gained popularity for her 2019 single "More than Gold". She released her first single, "Nobody Else", in 2013 and released her debut album, Man of Galilee, in November 2019.

== Early life and education ==
Judikay was born in Sango Otta, Ogun State on 26 October 1994 and she is her parents' first child. She hails from Oshimili South Local Government Area of Delta State. She obtained her secondary education from Dalos College, Ota, Ogun State, and has a Bachelor's Degree in Theatre Arts from the Redeemer’s University, Osun State.

== Music career ==
Judikay began her music journey as a chorister in her church, Christian Pentecostal Mission. Later on, she became a backup vocalist for Florocka. In 2013, she released her first single titled "Nobody Else", marking her official appearance in the music scene. She gained popularity in 2019 when she released her second single “More than Gold”.

On 25, February 2019, she was signed to EeZee Conceptz, a Nigerian gospel record label. That same year in November, she released her first debut album Man of Galilee, comprising 14 tracks.

In June 2022, Judikay released her second album From this Heart comprising 12 tracks including "Mudiana", "Jesus is Coming" and "Your Grace". The album received a Boomplay Plaque after hitting 50 million streams on the global music network."Capable God" also ranked No. 1 on Boomplay's 2021 Top 50 Gospel Songs.

She was featured by gospel artist, Enkay Ogburuche in a song titled “Delight” in January 2023. She has collaborated with other gospel artists, including Emmanuel Iren, Mercy Chinwo, and Enkay Ogboruche.

== Discography ==
=== Albums ===
Year released	Title	Details	Ref
November 2019	Man of Galilee	Number of Tracks: 14; Formats: Streaming, digital download	
June 2022	From This Heart	Number of Tracks: 12; Formats: Streaming, digital download	

=== Singles ===
- "Jehovah'Meliwo" ft 121 Selah (2023)
- "I Bow" (2022)
- "Your Grace" (2022)
- "Daddy You Too Much" (2022)
- "Elohim" (2022)
- "The One For Me" (2022)
- "Nothing Is Too Hard For You" ft The Gratitude (2021)
- "Songs of Angels" (2019)
- "Fountain" (2019)
- "More Than Gold" ft Mercy Chinwo (2019)
- "Capable God" (2019)
- "Satisfied" (2017)
- "Have Your Way" (2016)
- "Nobody Else" (2013)
- "Dance Anyhow" (2024)
- "The Conqueror's Chant (Agalliao) (2025)

== Personal life ==
Judikay married Ikechukwu Anselem Opara on 7 November 2020, in Lagos, Nigeria. In March 2022, they announced the birth of their son.

== Awards and nominations ==
In November 2020, Judikay was mentioned on YNaija as one of the top 10 Gospel Artistes for October, 2020.

Year	Award	Category	Result	Ref
2019	AGMMA	Breakthrough Artiste of Excellence	Won	
2020	Maranatha Awards	Best Breakthrough Female Minister	Won	
2020	Impact Gospel Awards	African Artist of the Year	Won	
2021	Maranatha Awards	Gospel Song of The Year	Nominated	
2022	Vine Awards	African Act of the Year	Nominated	

== See also ==
- List of Nigerian gospel musicians
