= Etim Moses Essien =

Nigerian haematologist (1934–2020)

Essien Etim Moses
- Born: 31 December 1934; Nigeria
- Died: 12 November 2020 (aged 85)
- Citizenship: Nigerian
- Occupations: Hematologist; Educationist; Researcher
- Awards: NNOM and OFR

Essien Etim Moses, NNOM, OFR (31 December 1934 - 12 November 2020) was a Nigerian Professor of Hematology and Chairman of the Governing Board of the Nigerian National Merit Award. Professor Essien began his career in 1970 at the University College Hospital, Ibadan as a lecturer and Consultant of Hematology. In 1977, he became a professor of hematology at the same university. He was a member of the WHO Expert Panel on Blood and a member of the American Association for the Advancement of Science.

== Fellowship ==
- Fellow, Nigerian Academy of Science
- Fellow, African Academy of Sciences
- Fellow, Royal College of Pathologists

== Awards ==
- TWAS Prize (1993)
