= David Okali =

David Okali is a Nigerian Emeritus Professor of Forest ecology at the University of Ibadan and former President of the Nigerian Academy of Science who succeeded Professor Gabriel Babatunde Ogunmola in 2006.
