= Chukwuedu Nwokolo =

Nigerian medical doctor

Chukwuedu Nwokolo FRCP, RCPE, MRCS, OFR, MRCP
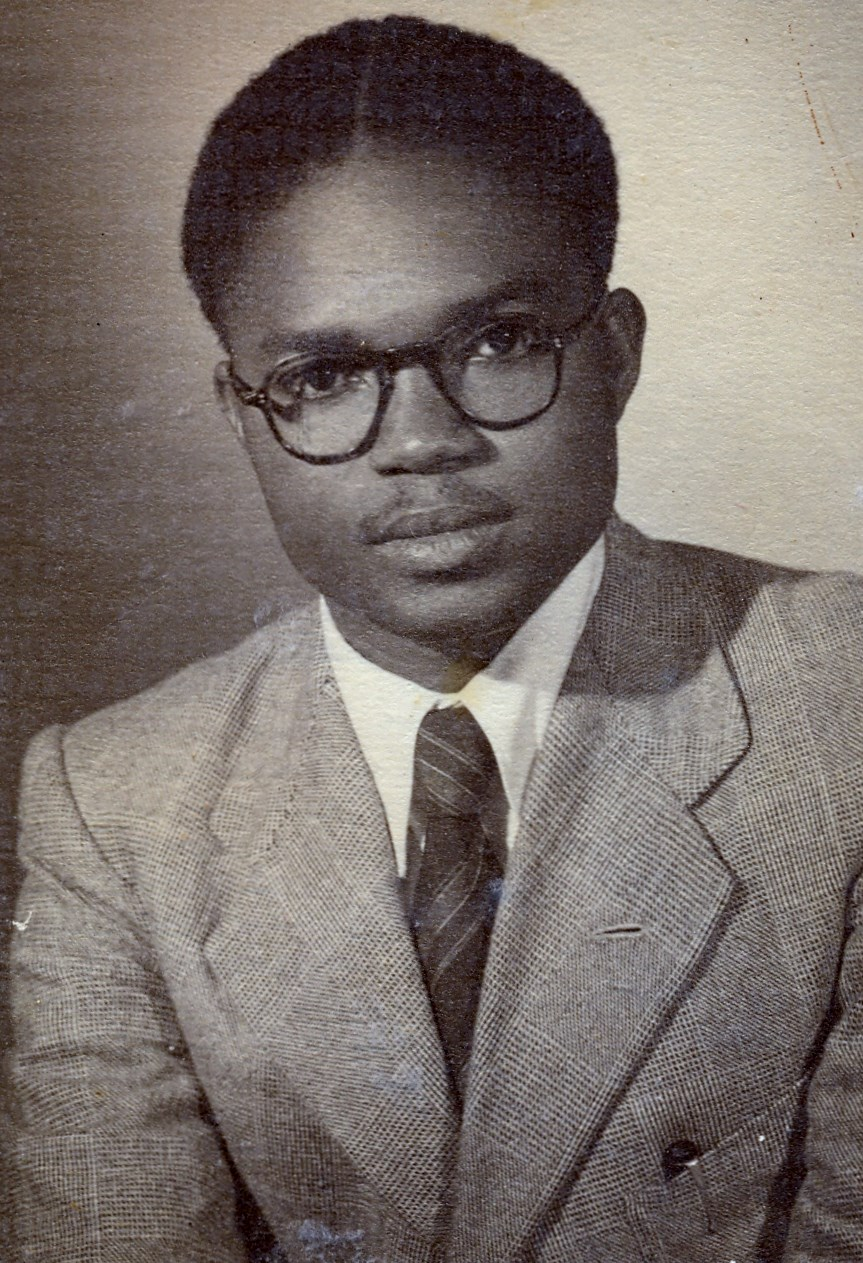
- Born: 19 April 1921
- Died: 18 May 2014 (aged 93); New York
- Education: Human, medical and life sciences
- Alma mater: Yaba Higher College, University of Ibadan, Queen Mary's Hospital, Sidcup: London, University of Minnesota
- Occupations: Medical doctor, humanitarian, research scientist and professor of medicine
- Years active: 1947–2004
- Known for: Discovering and mapping out the area of lung disease in Eastern Nigeria, with a study of the disease in Africa and clinical research for its control
- Notable work: An Introduction to Clinical Medicine
- Title: Emeritus Professor
- Spouse: Njideka Priscilla Nwokolo: née: Okonkwo
- Children: 7
- Parent(s): Nathaniel Ezuma Nwokolo and Matilda Nwokolo: née: Efobi

Chukwuedu Nathaniel II Nwokolo (19 April 1921 – 18 May 2014) was a Nigerian physician specialist in tropical diseases. He was recognised for discovering and mapping out the area of paragonimiasis lung disease in Eastern Nigeria, with a study of the disease in Africa and clinical research for its control. He founded SICREP: Sickle Cell Research Programme to effectively fight the disease in Nigeria and globally.

== Early life ==
=== Parents and birth ===
Nwokolo was born on Tuesday, 19 April 1921 – at Amaimo, now located in Imo State: Nigeria, where his parents worked for Church Missionary Society as evangelists. He was the first male child amongst seven children His father: Nathaniel Ezuma Nwokolo, was a church teacher; and his mother was trained at the Niger CMS: Church Missionary Society Onitsha.

== Education ==
Nwokolo started primary school at Ezinihitte-Mbaise in today's Imo State, and then proceeded to Government College Umuahia. In 1939, he entered Higher College Yaba, studying medicine. Most of the students that went to Government College Umuahia went on to Yaba College which was the only science-based institution of higher learning in Nigeria at the time. Nwokolo's medical course lasted seven years including internship, with the General Hospital Lagos and Aba General Hospital as teaching hospitals. Nwokolo qualified as a medical doctor in 1946, and consequently got the LMS: Licenciate of the School of Medicine.and won the Walter Johnson prize in public health.

== Early career ==
=== Pioneer Medical Officer ===
After his internship at Lagos General Hospital, Nwokolo was posted from 1947 to 1949 at General Hospital Enugu.

In 1948, as the University College Ibadan was opening its teaching hospital temporarily at the Ibadan Adeoyo Hospital, the university made a request to the government for junior doctors to work as house officers. Nwokolo was the first of such assistant medical officers to be seconded in 1949. Nwokolo worked in the department of medicine at the University College Hospital from 1949 to 1950, and subsequently proceeded to London, uplifted with a professional letter of recommendation from professor Alexander Brown.

=== England move and RCPL ===
Arriving in England in 1950, he studied at Queen Mary's Hospital, Sidcup, and worked in medicine and surgery house jobs in Dover, becoming qualified to register and practice in Great Britain. He then became a senior house physician in the geriatrics unit of Queen Mary's Hospital, Sidcup. There, Nwokolo worked towards getting his MRCP: Membership of the Royal College of Physicians.

In 1952, Nwokolo moved to Edinburgh to prepare further for the MRCP. He attended lectures and tutorials of the Royal College of Physicians of Edinburgh, and clinics of some consultants. Early in 1953, Nwokolo took the MRCP examination. He was one of the few Africans to obtain Member of the Royal College of Physicians qualification, and the second Nigerian to do so, the first being Dr. Olu Mabayoje. Armed with the MRCP, Nwokolo went back to his former Queen Mary's Hospital, Sidcup, London. There, he served as a physician. He returned to Nigeria – as a specialist in internal medicine – just on time for his marriage to Njideka Priscilla Nwokolo: née: Okonkwo – on Saturday 4 July 1953.

=== Civil service ===
When he came back from London, Nwokolo returned to the civil service. He was appointed a special grade medical officer. Reorganisation in the service enabled all assistant medical officers to become medical officers after serving a period of one year as house officers. Nwokolo did one year house job in Ibadan before going to the United Kingdom for specialist medical qualification. He also did another year of house jobs in Dover after his highly successful conjoint LRCP and MRCP examination.

With his senior house officer appointment and post MRCP working experience in the United Kingdom, Nwokolo earned his designation as a full medical officer on special grade. General Hospital Enugu was where he mainly served. Nwokolo had his extramural private practice in his home in the evenings. He was in charge of medical wards where patients were admitted and treated.

=== Research ===
Nwokolo carried out medical research in the wards as well as in the field. He did major research in endomyocardial fibrosis, endemic goitre, sickle-cell disease and other areas of national need. Fieldwork was usually done during weekends, and included travelling in his car to different locations in Eastern Nigeria plus Northern and Mid-Western Nigeria, as well as to Obudu. Nwokolo published about nine papers based on his research while in the civil service. On the strength of his research and papers, he was made a Fellow of the Royal College of Physicians (F.R.C.P.) in 1960, based on recommendations by his supervisors, Professor Alexander Brown and Professor Harold Scaborough, a visiting scholar from University of Wales. Nwokolo was also invited to teach as senior lecturer at University College Ibadan by professor Brown. In addition, working with the Rockefeller Foundation, Professor Brown recommended Nwokolo for a research fellowship in gastroenterology at the University of Minnesota.

=== Rockefeller Foundation fellowship ===
For his 1963 to 1964 Rockefeller Foundation fellowship at Minnesota, Nwokolo was assigned to the gastroenterology unit under James Carey, chief of gastroenterology.

== Career ==
=== Gastroenterology department founding ===
After his return from the United States, Nwokolo was appointed associate professor of medicine. Subsequently, he set up a sub department of gastroenterology, with senior registrar Dr. Lewis. Nwokolo led research on various gastro-intestinal problems using intestinal biopsies and procedures he learnt in the United States at University of Minnesota.

=== Civil War in Nigeria ===
In 1966, before the Nigerian Civil War with Biafra broke out in 1967, with hostilities and killing of Igbo people rising, Nwokolo left Ibadan for Enugu with his wife and children.

=== Medical school establishment ===
For those, such as Nwokolo, who escaped from Ibadan and Western Nigeria, the experience was so terrible that twenty-one specialist doctors mainly from Ibadan and Lagos met and resolved to establish a University Teaching Hospital in Enugu. At the meeting were doctors: Nwokolo, Onuaguluchi, Udekwu, Nwako, Nwachukwu, Eziashi, Ikeme, Udeh, Ogan, Uche, Okoro, Kaine, Udeozor, Okafor, Njoku-Obi, Ifekwunigwe, and others. Through Dr. Nlogha Okeke plus permanent secretary and chief secretary to the government: chief Onyegbula, approval was rapidly obtained from the military governor: Chukwuemeka Odumegwu Ojukwu to open a teaching hospital with Enugu General Hospital as base. Ojukwu also approved swift establishment of the faculty of medicine, headed by professor Kodilinye, while Nwokolo became the first head of the department of medicine and associate dean of medicine at the new medical school.

Nwokolo continued to work as head of the department of medicine of the university teaching hospital which had moved to Awka-Etiti when Enugu was threatened during the civil war. Nwokolo also carried out research especially relevant to the terrible war conditions of starvation and malnutrition. He toured churches and public gatherings to educate the people on nutrition and feeding for survival. Several mimeographed papers were produced and distributed for public education.

With the approval of the Nigerian Federal Government for the re-opening of the University of Nigeria Nsukka, Nwokolo returned to his position as head of the department of medicine. He was appointed full professor in 1971. Accordingly, renowned Welsh academic, professor Eldryd Parry, who previously served at University College Hospital, Ibadan from 1960, affirms that Nwokolo led and facilitated the establishment of medical schools in Enugu and Nsukka.

Nwokolo was an advisor for the World Health Organization. From 1963 to 1964, he was a Rockefeller Foundation fellow in gastroenterology at the University of Minnesota. He was honoured in 1964 with the Edinburgh: Scotland "Free Man of the City" award and "Key to the City of Edinburgh," having been inducted as a fellow of the Royal College of Physicians of Edinburgh. He was a fellow of the Royal College of Physicians, fellow of the Nigerian Postgraduate Medical College: FMCP, fellow of the West African College of Physicians: FWACP, and fellow of the Nigerian Academy of Science.

Nwokolo had Membership of the Royal College of Surgeons: MRCS and Membership of the Royal College of Physicians: MRCP; as well as being an Officer of the Order of the Federal Republic: OFR. He was chairman: joint council of ASUTECH: Anambra State University of Technology – now Nnamdi Azikiwe University and Enugu based Institute of Management and Technology, and board chairman of University of Calabar Teaching Hospital.

The Professor Chukwuedu Nwokolo Annual Lecture Series and Award of Prizes for Academic Excellence to stimulate research and scholarship was established in his honour by professor Benjamin Chukwuma Ozumba in 2006.

== Service ==
Nwokolo was an advisor to the Federal Government of Nigeria at the National Science and Technology Development Fund. Nwokolo was an in-law of Jaja Wachuku: Nigeria's first Speaker of the House of Representatives, first Nigerian Ambassador and Permanent Representative to the United Nations; and first Nigerian Minister of Foreign Affairs and Commonwealth Relations. He was a contributor to the Cambridge University published: Principles of Medicine in Africa.

== Honours ==
Nwokolo had a Licentiate from the Royal College of Physicians of London, honorary doctor of science from the University of Maiduguri plus another honorary doctor of science from the University of Ibadan; and was a professor emeritus at the University of Nigeria Nsukka, Nigerian National Order of Merit Award-winner, national chairman and vice-president at West African College of Physicians, pro-chancellor and chairman of council at Ahmadu Bello University; chairman at Medical Research Council of Nigeria, chairman: governing board at National Council for Medical Research, president at Association of Physicians of Nigeria and Ugo-Dibia: Eagle of Medicine.

- 1972–75: Dean Faculty of Medicine: University of Nigeria Nsukka, as well as Professor of Medicine: 1971 to 1980
- 1974: Accepted an invitation from the Japanese government as dean and visited the University of Tokyo which was collaborating with University of Nigeria Nsukka in research
- 1977–80: Chairman: National Institute for Medical Research Yaba: Nigeria
- 1980: On 21 March, delivered Professor Alexander Brown‟s lecture in Ibadan, titled: Facing the challenge of Medical Research in Nigeria
- 1982: Appointed Emeritus Professor of Medicine: University of Nigeria Nsukka. On 15 July, received the Nigerian National Order of Merit Award, as well as Officer of the Order of the Federal Republic: OFR honour from president Shehu Shagari
- 1983: Thanksgiving service for the career of Nwokolo, organised at University of Nigeria Nsukka by Professors Johnson and Ebele Maduewesi
- 1984: Appointed member of Ahmadu Bello University Council. Awarded D.Sc: Honoris causa by the University of Maiduguri
- 1985: Appointed chairman: joint council of ASUTECH: Anambra State University of Technology – now Nnamdi Azikiwe University and IMT: Institute of Management and Technology Held office till1986 and was instrumental to the creation of the Awka campus of ASUTECH which later transformed to the present Nnamdi Azikiwe University
- 1986: Appointed board chairman: UCTH: University of Calabar Teaching Hospital Nwokolo served till 1994 following a second term appointment as board chairman of UCTH. He was also appointed member of National Science and Technology Development Fund
- 1988: Honoured with a Doctor of Science degree by the University of Ibadan, together with Olusegun Obasanjo, Matthew Mbu, Michael Ibru and Emmanuel Alayande
- 1994: Nwokolo initiated a private research organisation called SICREP: Sickle Cell Research Programme to work on sickle cell disease.
- 1996: Appointed Knight of Saint Christopher by the Anglican Church Diocese on the Niger.
- 1996: On 12 September, Nwokolo was honoured by the Nigerian Postgraduate Medical College with a distinguished fellowship award with citation by professor Ayo Binitie
- 1998: Nwokolo was featured in the NTA: Nigerian Television Authority documentary on Nigerian Heroes. On 10 March, Nwokolo he was nominated by UCTH: University of Calabar Teaching Hospital for the Mary Slessor Distinguished Merit Award for service to humanity. This was in recognition of his "research works, introduction of the Drug Revolving Fund at University of Calabar Teaching Hospital, a patient funded system that was adopted by state governments in Nigeria; as well as for the system's acceptance in core line with the Bamako Initiative; and as the "longest serving chairman of University of Calabar Teaching Hospital's board of management
- 2004: On 15 January, the Professor Chukwuedu Nwokolo Hall at the College of Medicine: University of Nigeria Teaching Hospital Enugu was launched

== Publications ==
Some of Nwokolo's research articles and book publications are listed below:

- Nwokolo, Chukwuedu. (1969). Biafran Refugees: Problems of Disease Prevention and Medical Care. Enugu: Biafra Rehabilitation Commission.
- Nwokolo, Chukwuedu. (1984). The Place of Traditional Medicine and Other Local Resources in a Modern Health Care Programme in Nigeria. Maiduguri: University of Maiduguri.
- Nwokolo, Chukwuedu. (1993). Science for Survival: The Nigerian Option. Nigeria: Medical Development.
- Nwokolo, Chukwuedu, et al. (2004). Principles of Medicine in Africa.Cambridge: Cambridge University Press, ISBN 9780521806169

== Personal life ==
With his wife Lady Njideka Nwokolo (née Okonkwo) whom he married on 4 July 1953, Nwokolo had seven children, four girls and three boys. Nwokolo died in New York, United States on 18 May 2014 at the age of 93.

== See also ==
- Nigerian Medical Association
- Nwabueze Nwokolo
- John T. Nwangwu
