= Augustine Njoku Obi =

Nigerian virologist

- Born: 1930 (age 95–96); Owerri, Imo State, Nigeria
- Citizenship: Nigerian
- Occupations: educator; microbiologist; researcher
- Known for: Cholera vaccine

Augustine Njoku Obi // (1930 – 2003) was a Nigerian Professor of virology and former President of the Nigerian Academy of Science. He was known for developing a cholera vaccine approved as efficacy in 1971 by WHO. In 1985, he was elected President of the Nigerian Academy of Science to succeeded Professor Emmanuel Emovon.
