= Olayiwola =

Olayiwola is a Nigerian surname. Notable people with the surname include:

- Lamidi Olayiwola Adeyemi III (born 1938), traditional ruler of Oyo
- Jacqueline Nwando Olayiwola, American physician, author, and professor
- Porsha Olayiwola, American poet
- Oluwole Olayiwola Amusan, Nigerian academic
