= Cyril Agodi Onwumechili =

Nigerian academic (1932–2023)

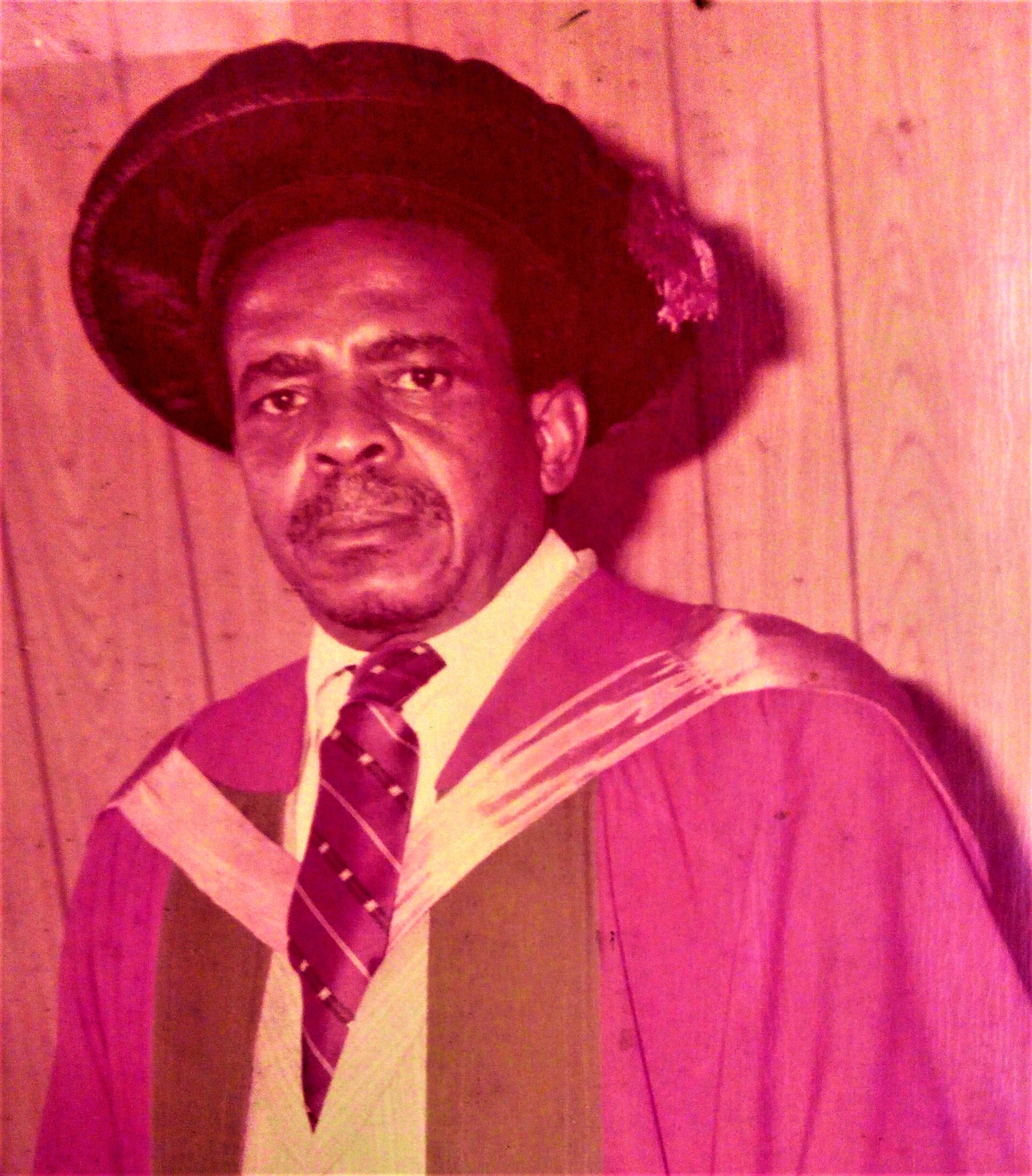
- Onwumechili in 1979
- Born: 20 January 1932; Oji River, Southern Region, British Nigeria (now in Enugu State, Nigeria)
- Died: 16 May 2023 (aged 91)
- Citizenship: Nigeria
- Education: King's College, Lagos; University of London; University of Ibadan
- Occupations: Educator; physicist; researcher

Cyril Agodi Onwumechili (20 January 1932 – 16 May 2023) was a Nigerian physicist, academic administrator, and professor of geophysics at the University of Ibadan and later University of Nigeria, Nsukka. He was the fourth Vice Chancellor of the University of Ife (now Obafemi Awolowo University) from January 1979 to December 1982 and the former President/Vice Chancellor of the Anambra State University of Technology, Enugu, Nigeria, from January 1983 to December 1986 (when it incubated to the now Enugu State University of Science and Technology, Enugu; the now Nnamdi Azikiwe University, Awka; and the now Ebonyi State University, Abakaliki). He delivered the Ahiajoku lecture on 20 November 2000. He was the first Nigerian geophysicist and the second president of the Nigerian Academy of Science. He was elected as president of the academy in 1979 to succeed Professor Victor Adenuga Oyenuga, the first emeritus professor of the University of Ibadan and the first African professor of Agricultural science.

== Early life ==
Onwumechili was born on 20 January 1932 at Inyi town in Oji River, a city in Enugu State, Eastern Nigeria. He attended King's College, Lagos and received a bachelor's degree in Physics from the University of London in 1953 and master's degree in physics from the University of Ibadan in 1954. He later received a Doctorate degree from the University of London.

== Career ==
Onwumechili joined the Department of physics, University of Ibadan as academic staff. He was promoted to the rank of Professor in 1962 and appointed Head of the Department of Physics and Dean of Faculty of Science at Ibadan before he left in 1966 to join the services of the University of Nigeria, Nsukka as Head of the Department of Physics. During the Nigerian Civil War, he was appointed Acting Vice Chancellor of the University of Science and Technology, Port Harcourt. After the Civil War, he took over from Associate Prof. J.C. Ene as Dean of the Faculty of Science, University of Nigeria, from December 1970 - June 1971. In 1973, he was elected the first Dean of the Faculty of Physical Sciences, University of Nigeria, Nsukka, thrice elected (1973–1974; 1975–1976; October 1978- December 1978). Onwumechili left to become the Vice Chancellor, University of Ife (Now Obafemi Awolowo University, Ife).

== Death ==
Onwumechili died on 16 May 2023, at the age of 91.
