= Timi Abibu Lagunju =

Yorubian monarch

Ọba Timi Abibu Sàngólámì (Ọ)Lágúnjú (c. 1817 - 1900) was a Yoruba monarch of the town of Ede, and leader in the 19th century. He was the first Muslim Timi that Ede produced, he also belonged to the first generation of Yoruba Muslims who held high political office in the pre-colonial era and who used their positions to enhance the growth of his town, Ede and his religion, Islam. Indeed, Abibu Lagunju was the second Muslim Oba in Yorubaland given the fact that he was already on the throne for a couple of years when, in November 1857, the American Baptist Missionary, Reverend W.H. Clarke, visited Ede.

The first Muslim Oba in Yorubaland was a Muslim prince called Prince Ali of Ado-Ekiti. He was enthroned as Ewi Ali Atewogboye after the demise of Ewi Aroloye in 1836.

Tradition had it that Prince Ali resisted attempts of the priests and chiefs to renounce Islam before he was enthroned. He was adamant to rather hold to Islam than take the throne. Ewi Ali Atewogboye led the people of Ado-Ekiti back to its original location after sojourning for sometime at Oke Ako due to invasion of Benin Armies and Fulani Jihad. Ewi Ali Atewogboye remained the first and only Ewi of Ado-Ekiti since the 19th century to embrace Islam.

Timi Abibu Lagunju of Ede was enthroned in 1855 as an Oba. This position is buttressed by the fact that other Yoruba Muslim strongholds produced Muslim Obas at a much later date: Lamuye of Iwo in 1860, Momodu Latoosa of Ibadan in 1871, Iyanda Oloko of Epe in 1875, Aseyin "Noo" (Nuruddin) of Iseyin in 1895, Alaafin Lawani Agogoja of New Oyo in 1905 and Awujale Adeona Fusigboye of Ijebu-Ode in 1906. Lagunju was certainly a force to reckon with in the history of Islam in Ede.

Timi Lagunju knew personally and was well acquainted with most Yoruba military, political and religious leaders of note between 1840 and 1900. Lagunju's era is also worthy of study because he was the most enigmatic Timi to have ruled Ede since the 19th century to date. He was the only Timi to be dethroned thrice, being reinstated after the first two times but eventually losing out on the third count.

== Biography ==
Timi Abibu (Sangolami) Olagunju was born around 1817 to the royal family of Oduniyi Olagunju in Ede, a descendant of Lalemo. The descendants of Lalemo, which include Kubolaje Agbonran, and his siblings, Oyefi, Ajenju, Arohanran, and Oduniyi (his father) were chased from the original town of Ede-Ile in 1817, and established the present town, Ede. Olagunju (Lagunju) was born soon after. He was given the name Sangolami by his parents who were Sango (god of thunder) devotees because his birth was bizarre as he held a thunder stone in his left hand and a piece of paper with Qur'anic inscription on it in his right hand. This prompted the family, as it was practice among the Yoruba in those days to consult the Ifa oracle whenever a baby was born to the family, especially with strange event. The family consulted the oracle and they were told that the boy would be a ruler and added a clause that he would switch from his father's traditional religion to a strange Arab religion. This prophecy angered the reigning Timi then, so he ordered that the boy be beheaded, but his father Oduniyi prevented that to happen.

In his youth, he left Ede for Ilorin where he embraced Islam. When he returned to Ede, he drew opposition from some residents in Ede and he moved to a location far from the main centre of the town. In the new location, he practised Islam with a few other adherents. Despite his many travails, he remained the longest serving Timi, having reigned for 60 years before he died at the age of 90 years.

== Lagunju years on the throne ==
Sangolami Abibu Lagunju was born before 1817 when the New Ede was established by Timi Kubolaje Agbonran. Existing traditions also indicate that Abibu Lagunju succeeded Timi Ojo Arohanran, the reigning Timi at the outbreak of Batedo War (involving Ibadan and Ijaiye) of 1844. And given Olunlade's account that Timi Ojo Arohanran "spent about three years on the throne," and that the stool of the Timi was vacant for nine years after Arohanran's death, it is plausible to suggest that Lagunju was crowned the Timi around 1855/ 1856.

J.F. Ade-Ajayi wrote that during W.H. Clarke's visit to Ede in November 1857 Lagunju "became the ruler of this town in the place of his father, the deceased, and brings with him into office, the influence of his new religion" and that in the aftermath of the fall of Old Oyo, "By 1858, the Timi of Ede was a Muslim... Beyond the testimonies of Clarke and Ade-Ajayi, both Ede and Ibadan traditions also record that Timi Abibu Lagunju was on the throne during the tenure of Basorun Ogunmola of Ibadan (1856-1867), and precisely that Ogunmola intervened in Ede politics when Lagunju was first dethroned. It is recorded that Ogunmola installed Olunloye in place of Lagunju. Ede traditions as preserved by Olunlade further say that Timi Lagunju dethroned two Timis - Olunloye and Lansebe, who were crowned in his place during the first two depositions with the support of Aare Momodu Latoosa (1871-1885), and that Olunloye was dethroned shortly before the outbreak of the Kiriji War in 1878. Lagunju's third and final deposition was in 1892, given the tradition that his successor, Timi Mosunloye "reigned for seven years" and that Mosunloye's successor, Timi Oyelekan, "ascended the throne in 1899." Samuel Johnson, Kemi Morgan and Olunlade said that Lagunju died in exile in Ibadan in 1900.

Timi Lagunju was the second Muslim Oba in nineteenth century Yorubaland. When W. H. Clarke visited Ede during Lagunju's reign (in 1857), he reported that Islam was enjoying royal patronage and support. Apart§ from Timi Lagunju whom Clarke described as a "tolerant Muslim" and "young follower of the prophet (Muhammad)," he also had interview "with a company of civil Muhammedans ... one of whom is a man from Hausaland engaged in the silk trade, and possessed some information..." He also reports that one of the elders who gave the vote of thanks on his departure was a "Muhammedan." He further stress on the grandeur of Ede monarchy:

... Having given some proof of their skill in the evolution of African dancing, I was led off in haste to the house of Daodu or prince, who was to receive me previous to visiting the chief. I was about entering his compound when I heard a pearl of four guns and a rush towards me with a shout as I advanced into the rear. Such as strange and unusual welcome I did not immediately understand. This was my salute of welcome. Thus, some idea of the civilized reception of honored guests had made its way this far into Africa. This kind prince into whose hands I had fallen soon pointed me out an airy and comfortable apartment, from which I could, for the most part, exclude the noisy crowd and vacant gazers, when rest and retirement were demanded and yet enjoyed a sufficiency of air. What a privilege in an African town. About three, o'clock, after enjoying a little rest, I was conducted by the Daodu to the residence of his elder brother, the chief...

Timi Lagunju attempted to implement Islamic code of law, the Shari'ah, as he understood it in the running of state affairs. One of his intentions in using the Shari'ah was to purge Islam of accretions, syncretism, and adulteration. His Shari'ah court was presided over by Qadi Sidiq at Agbeni in Ibadan up till 1913. His administration was particularly harsh in its treatment of prostitutes, hoarders, burglars and thieves. The end product of this style of administration was that Ede, under Timi Lagunju, became a crime free society. Olunlade, again, testifies thus:

... Timi Lagunju effectively checked all forms of stealing and burglary. If anyone was caught in the act of stealing, the Timi would sell him into slavery and would also sell members of his family. A few men having been made examples, all potential thieves were effectively checked.

Part of the progress registered in Ede during Timi Lagunju era was that the subject towns which paid obeisance to Ede increased. It was during this time that Ilorin conquered old Offa, and the reigning Olofa took refuge in Ede, where he was given a site now called Ofatedo (i.e. the Offa people colonized this place). Timi Abibu Sangolami gave the then Olofa two hundred hoes, two hundred cutlasses, two hundred baskets, and two hundred of every instrument or household utensils in order to make his new home easy to settle in.

In spite of the stormy relationship which Lagunju had with the traditionalists, he was favourably disposed to Christianity given the testimony of the first American Baptist missionary to the town, W.H. Clarke. In November 1857, Lagunju had permitted the Baptist missionary to visit Ede and preach the gospel of Christ. During his visit, Clarke was not only given civic reception and well treated, he was also allowed "to preach some special truths of the gospel" to the chiefs and "a company of civil Mohammedans." Clarke states:

...I was pleased with his (Lagunju) free and open toleration, so not in agreement with the Muslim faith he professed to hold... His first proposal as to the length of my stay was nine days, which honour I could but decline in staying four or five days as a maximum."

And while he pursued policies and measures which would put Islam on a strong footing in Ede, Lagunju also ensured that he maintained very cordial and diplomatic relationship with Muslim Obas and Muslim military leaders of the century. Among the Muslim Obas of the period, Lagunju was particularly close to Oba Momodu Lamuye of Iwo who ascended the throne of Iwo in 1860. Both remained mutual friends till death parted them in 1900 and March 1906 respectively. Another Muslim monarch whom Lagunju respected and revered was Akirun Aliyu Oyewole of Ikirun under whom Ikirun became a de facto Islamic state.

Lagunju was very close to Ibadan Muslim warriors particularly, Osi Osundina (Osi to Balogun Ibikunle) and Alli Laluwoye, the second-in-command to Aare Latoosa from October 1871. Osi Osundina's picture that has survived from tradition is that of "a Muslim titled officer who wears his turban to the battle field and performs his ablution under a hail of arrows." However, Lagunju was closest to the generalissimo of Ibadan army and Muslim stalwart, Aare Momodu Latoosa (1871-1885). Latoosa's Islamic faith was so strong that he did not even neglect his prayers in the war camps. Indeed, Lagunju's friendship with Momodu Latoosa and the bond of Islam proved very useful for him in his moments of travails. After he had spent seven years in exile in lbadan (during his first deposition), Lagunju was able to wrest his throne back from Olunloye only with the support of Aare Latoosa. During his second deposition, Lagunju succeeded in wresting the throne from Lansebe, with the active support of Ibadan forces under the firm instruction of Aare Latoosa. Available traditions state that on Lagunju's final deposition and exile to Ibadan in 1892, one of his wives (from Ile-Ife) left with the children for her home town where they eventually became first generation Muslims. It is claimed that one of Lagunju's children called Raji later emerged as Chief Imam of Ife. One account said that the first recognized mosque in Ile-Ife was built by Raji, while another, though silent on the builder, says that "the first recognized mosque was built at Itakogun, lle-Ife in 1903 during the reign of Ooni Adelekan Olubuse I, who died in 1909. And since Lagunju was exiled to Ibadan in 1893, and that the second Chief Imam of Ife, Kaseem Adeosun (1922-1934) returned from Lagos to Ile-Ife in 1893, there is no doubt that Kaseem and Raji Lagunju were pioneer Muslims in Ile-Ife. During the imamate years of Kaseem Adeosun, Raji Lagunju was his Naibi (Deputy Imam) and on Kaseem's death in 1934, Raji became the Chief Imam, a position he occupied till 1949.

At the time Timi Lagunju was being banished from the town, his supporters wanted to react against his opponents but he prevented them from doing so. Meanwhile, his opponents threw his Islamic books on the streets. When he saw them doing this, he was reported to have told them that: "Insha Allah (God's willing), your children would be Muslims."

== War and peace process ==
While some monarchs, particularly the Alaafin of Oyo, no longer went to battle fronts from the 1840s, Timi Lagunju still personally led Ede forces on military expeditions particularly on the side of Ibadan. From mid-1850, there was an Ede-Ibadan military confederacy with Ibadan as the stronger partner. Lagunju allied Ede with Ibadan, the most militarily strong power in 19th century Yorubaland. It is on record that Ede under Lagunju fought on the side of Ibadan during the Ijaye War (1860-1865).

Lagunju again sided with Ibadan during the Jalumi war of 1878 and fought to expel the Fulani from northern Yorubaland. During this war, Ede forces under Lagunju camped at Ikirun, and the site was subsequently referred to as Oke-Timi. Ede's participation in the Jalumi war was partially a defensive war as the Emir of Ilorin had directed Balogun Ajia, the commander of the Ilorin forces, to conquer Ikirun, Osogbo, Ede and Iwo with their villages. Traditions preserved by Olunlade record that both Timi Lagunju and Balogun Ajayi Ogboriefon distinguished themselves in this war which ended in favour of Ibadan allied army. Ede under Timi Lagunju also allied with Ibadan in the Ekitiparapo War (1879-1886). At the initial stage of the war, Lagunju dispatched the deposed Timi Olunloye to the war-front as the captain of Ede forces. The latter lost his life in the war.

Due to Ede's material and human support for the Ibadan alliance, Derin Ologbenla, the Ooni-elect of Ife contemplated a military assault on the town in April 1882. He distributed arms and ammunitions to Ikire, Gbongan and Edunabon with a view to subjugating Modakeke first "which being removed out of the way Ede would be besieged and thus the Ibadans' in the camp would be taken in front and in the rear." However, the towns in question refused to carry out Derin's bidding and, contrarily, forwarded all the arms to Aare Latoosa.

Like Ife, the Ilorin forces also contemplated attacking Ede after the sack of Offa in 1887 because of its support for the Ibadan Alliance. Johnson stated:

The llorin plan, if successful at Ile-Aro was to attack Ofa, and Ede next and thereby dislodge the Ibadans' from Ikirun." Just as Ede participated actively in the Ekitiparapo War, it was also seriously involved in peace-making processes, particularly the 1886 Peace Treaty and the efforts of 1890. Ede, in fact, was one of the venues for the shuttle diplomacy. However, if the September 1886 Peace Treaty heralded the end of the Ekitiparapo war, the immediate aftermath of the peace wrought great material havoc on Timi Lagunju as his house in Ikirun was burnt down by some fleeing Ibadan slaves, those who seized the opportunity to assert their independence.

Timi Abibu Lagunju was committed to restoration of peace in Yorubaland after a century of internecine warfare. He was concerned about the sorry state of Ile-Ife, the cradle of the Yoruba race. Lagunju, Lamuye of Iwo and Balogun Osungbekun of Ibadan aligned themselves with Ife conditions for peace, i.e., that Modakeke should evacuate Ife. The 'Modakeke Question' threatened the 1886 Peace Treaty as the Modakeke leaders ran away from the peace venue, refusing to append their signatures and subsequently had to be bullied into signing the treaty. The position of Ede authorities is summarized in the records of Prof I.A. Akinjogbin:

They felt that the condition insisted upon by Ife was not too stringent to be accommodated. Indeed, both the Oluwo Lamuye and the Timi (Lagunju) of Ede as well as the lbadan authorities thought they had enough clout to persuade, indeed command, the Modakeke to move. The Timi said he would ask those of them from Ede to come back home and they would obey. The Oluwo said they could all come and live in his town. No one thought that the Modakeke would in the end prove adamant."

Even when the 1886 Peace Treaty failed to resolve the Modakeke Question, the 'Offa Question' and the Ijebu imbroglio, Timi Lagunju continued to liaise with the Oluwo of Iwo, Ibadan authorities and representatives of the Lagos Government towards finding a lasting solution to the crisis. Governor Alfred Moloney's commissioners, H. Higgins and Oliver Smith, had to spend some days in Ede in March 1890." The party later left Ede for Oyo in pursuit of the peace mission. Timi Lagunju appeared to have totally agreed with the Ibadan terms of peace as the peace declaration of May–June 1890 tended to suggest. Johnson states:

... This declaration was to be signed (by the Alaafin), also by the Oluwo, the Timi of Ede, the Bale of Ogbomoso and the Aseyin of Iseyin. On the 10th of May, the writer (Johnson) accompanied by Obakosetan started with a copy of the declaration. The Oluwo signed it on the same day, the lbadan Chiefs at Ikirun signed it on the 16th, the Timi of Ede's signature, the Ibadan Chiefs thought it was not necessary, being a subordinate chief to lbadan and what the Balogun of Ibadan signed was enough for him.... The Aseyin amidst the excitement of the Dahomian invasion signed the declaration on the 2nd of June, 1890.

== Deposition and after ==
The deposition of Timi Abibu Lagunju and his exile to Ibadan marked the end of an era in Ede history. Traditionalists who accepted Islam because of Timi Lagunju reverted to their gods. Muslims were also persecuted by traditionalists. To save their lives from persecution from these traditionalists and families, many of them fled to Owon-la-rogo compound which has been renamed as Imale Compound where they practiced their religion. Meanwhile, the leaders of Islam in the town made efforts, despite persecution by the traditionalists to continue to promote Islam. Such leaders include Zulu Qarneen, son of Noah.

His deposition was displeasing to Oyo authorities and Ibadan rulers who had come to regard Lagunju as one of the greatest statesmen and nationalists of the age. He was well known and respected by the Ibadan leaders. He had contributed to all Ibadan war efforts since the 1850s and had participated actively in the peace process. To the new Ibadan leaders, Lagunju was also a contemporary and friend of their fathers. For these reasons the Ibadan leaders felt that the deposed Lagunju should be restored to the throne of his ancestors. These leaders included Balogun Ajayi Osungbekun, Maye Osuntoki, Abese Kongi, son of Basorun Ogunmola, and Sunmonu Apampa. As the Ekitiparapo war was coming to a conclusive end and camps were being broken up, the Ibadan leaders still planned to spend about two days in Ede to reconcile Lagunju and the people in the town but the colonial government aborted this. Johnson states:

The Ibadans had wanted to stop a day or two at Ede to compose the difference between the people and the Timi Lagunju, who had been deposed by them but they were hurried homewards so that they could not do so. Thus, ended the sixteen years war.... The lbadan army arrived behind their town wall on the 22nd March 1893.

With his deposition, Lagunju came to accept his fate as an exile in Ibadan and he lived as a guest of Sunmonu Apampa, the post-1893 Asipa of Ibadan. Successive Baales of Ibadan between 1893 and 1900: Fijabi, Osuntoki and Fajinmi were very kind and nice to him. Similarly, the Balogun of the period, Akintola, accorded him immense respect. However, in spite of the good treatment and respect accorded him by the Ibadan leaders, Lagunju still carried the prayers for his reinstatement to the Alaafin of Oyo, Adeyemi, his suzerain around 1894 or early 1895. Alaafin Adeyemi I was quite sympathetic to Lagunju and subsequently took up the matter with Captain Bower but without success. In fact, Adeyemi I clashed with Bower over the Lagunju case as Samuel Johnson testifies: Then came the clash with Oyo over the case of Lagunju the ex-Timi of Ede, who appealed to his Suzerian to exert his good offices to restore him to his posts. And again with the humiliation of lbadan leaders in 1894 and the military bombardment of Oyo in 1895, Lagunju came to accept that he had finally lost the battle for his reinstatement and a new era had dawned. Lagunju died in 1900. With his death, the Ede Muslims had lost a friend, a helper, a sympathiser, a leader and a Mujaddid.
