= Deebo =

Deebo may refer to:

- Deebo Bhattacharya (fl. 1956–1974), Pakistani-Bangladeshi musician
- Deebo Samuel (born 1996), American football player
- Deebo, fictional bully in the Friday film franchise
- DeMar DeRozan (born 1989), American basketball player nicknamed "Deebo" after the Friday character

== See also ==
- Debo (disambiguation)
