= Anthony Afolabi Adegbola =

Nigerian animal scientist and academic

- Citizenship: Nigerian
- Occupations: educator; microbiologist; researcher

Anthony Afolabi Adegbola was a Nigerian Professor of Animal science and former President of the Nigerian Academy of Science. In 1993, he was elected President of the Nigerian Academy of Science to succeeded Professor Akpanoluo Ikpong Ikpong Ette.
