= Oye Gureje =

Nigerian psychiatrist

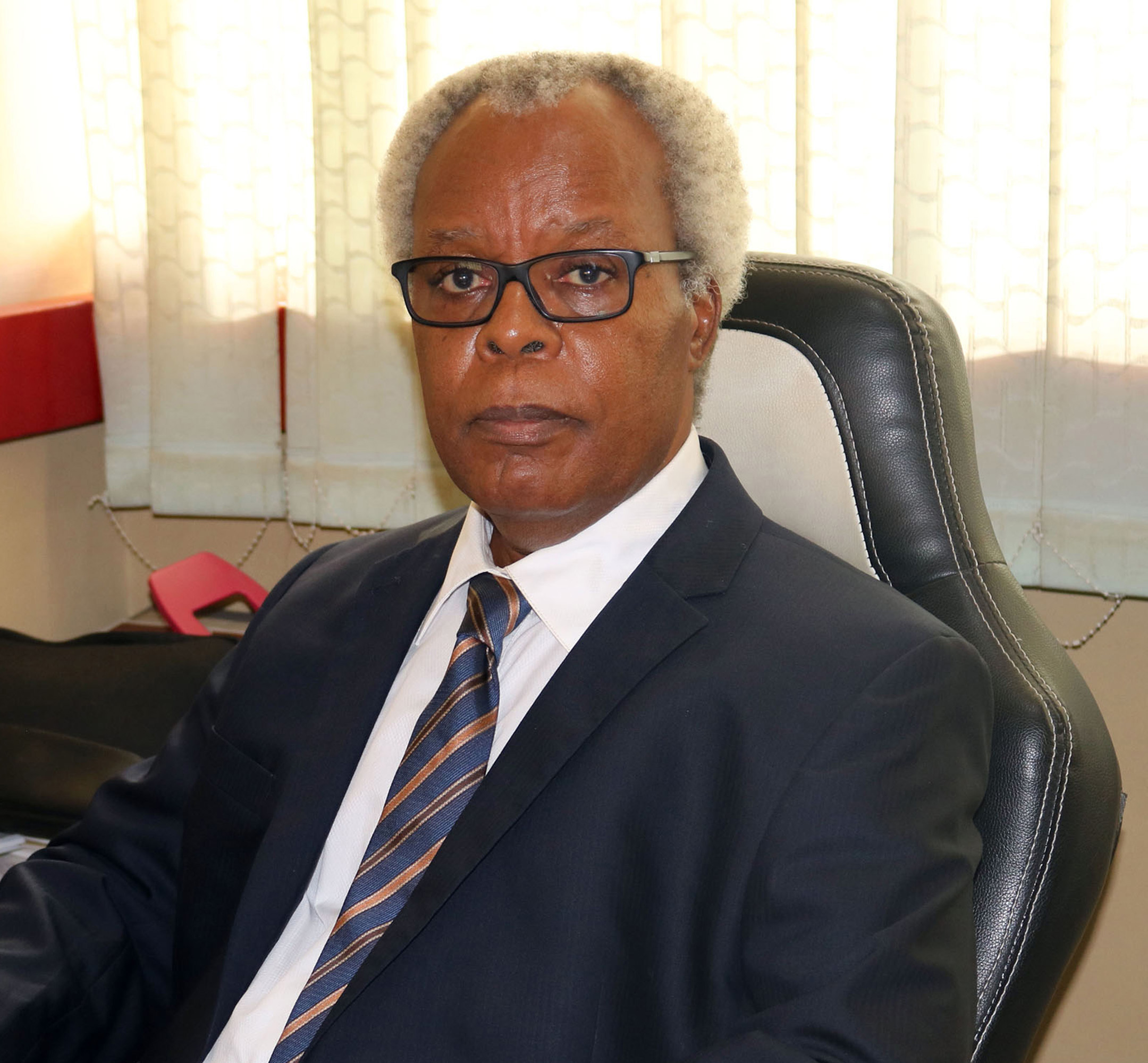
- Gureje in 2021
- Born: 1952 (age 73–74)
- Education: University of Benin; University of Manchester; University of Ibadan
- Occupation: Psychiatrist

Oyewusi Gureje, NNOM (born in 1952) is a Nigerian psychiatrist at the University of Ibadan, Nigeria and Director at the World Health Organization Collaborating Centre for Research and Training in Mental Health, Neurosciences, Drug and Alcohol Abuse in the institution. He is also a Professor Extraordinary at the Department of Psychiatry, Stellenbosch University, South Africa. He is best known for his work on epidemiology, nosology and global mental health and as one of the leading voices on mental health service and policy development in Africa. Oye Gureje has published more than 500 peer-reviewed scientific papers, monographs, book chapters, and other reports. He has been listed, since 2004, in the "top 1% cited researchers in the area of psychiatry and psychology" and, according to Clarivate Analytics, he is one of the "most influential scientific minds"

== Early education ==
Oyewusi Gureje, born in Ilesa, Osun State, Nigeria, he studied medicine at the University of Benin, Nigeria and later obtained a Master in Science from the University of Manchester, UK. He completed a (PhD) in neuropsychiatry (Title of Thesis: "The nosological status of schizophrenia”) at the University of Ibadan and went on to obtain a Doctor of Science in the same university.

== Career ==
Gureje has been teaching at the University of Ibadan as well as being a consultant psychiatrist at the University College Hospital since 1989. He was the head of the Department of Psychiatry in both institutions in 1999 – 2003 and 2007 -2011. In 2010, he established the Mental Health Leadership and Advocacy Programme (mhLAP) in the institution . The pioneering program has trained mental health specialists, service users, and carers, leaders of civil society organizations as well policymakers from across 10 sub-Saharan Africa countries in mental health leadership and advocacy skills and helped to form advocacy groups for mental health service development in the five West African anglophone countries, Nigeria and others. Gureje was president of the Association of Psychiatrists in Nigeria (2005 – 2009) and of the African Association of Psychiatrists and Allied Professions (2009 – 2014). He was the Zonal Representative for West and Central Africa of the World Psychiatric Association (2005 – 2008) and has been chair of its Task Force on Brain Drain (2007 – 2008), a member of several committees. He is a senior associate editor of Epidemiology and Psychiatric Sciences, and associate editor of the International Journal of Epidemiology and the International Review of Psychiatry.

== Mental health service and policy ==
Gureje was a member of the international advisory group for the revision of the Chapter on Mental and Behavioural Disorders of the 10th edition of the International Classification of Diseases (ICD-10) and was chair of the Workgroup on Somatic Distress and Dissociative Disorders, chair of the Workgroup on Cultural Guidance and vice-chair, Field Studies Coordinating Group. These activities were undertaken as part of the development of the ICD-11 which was adopted for global use by the WHO in May 2019. Gureje has been active in global mental health for several decades. He is a member of the executive of the World Mental Health Surveys Initiative. He is a member of an international group of experts that produced the 2007 Lancet Global Mental Health series and is a founding member of the Movement for Global Mental Health. He is a member of the Lancet Global Health Commission on High-Quality Health Systems in the SDG Era where he co-chaired the WorkGroup on Ethics. He was the Principal Investigator in the NIMH-funded Partnerships for Mental Health Development in Sub-Sahara Africa project, which included the conduct of the first randomized controlled trial of collaborative shared care for psychosis between traditional/faith healers and conventional. He has been involved in activities focused on strengthening mental health service development in low- and middle-income countries and chairs the National Mental Health Action Committee, a policy think-tank of the Nigeria Federal Ministry of Health. Through his work on mhLAP, he has supported policy and service development in Ghana, Gambia, Sierra Leone and Liberia. He was, between 2001 and 2003, a member of the World Health Organization Alcohol Policy and Strategy Advisory Committee and, in 2009, was the convener of the WHO/WPA Policy Roundtable on Scaling-up of Mental Health Service in Africa attended by ministers of health or their representatives from several Sub-Saharan African countries.

== Awards ==
Gureje is a recipient of grants and endowments from several global bodies such as the Wellcome Trust, Medical Research Council (UK), Grand Challenges Canada, CBM Australia, European Union, International Development Research Center, the US National Institute of Mental Health, the Global Forum for Health Research and the World Health Organization. He is an Honorary Member of the World Psychiatric Association, a Fellow of the Nigerian Academy of Science, a recipient of the Osun State award and Nigeria's highest award for academic achievement, the Nigeria National Order of Merit.

== Research profile ==
Google Scholar Citations

- ''Oye Gureje.'' Google Scholar Citations.

ResearchGate Profile

- Oye Gureje. ResearchGate.

Web of Science/Publons Profile

- Oye Gureje. Publons.
