= Awele Maduemezia =

Nigerian academic

- Born: Awele Maduemezia; 7 August 1934; Bukuru, Jos, Plateau State, Nigeria
- Died: 20 February 2018 (aged 83); Asaba, Delta State, Nigeria
- Burial place: Asaba, Delta State, Nigeria
- Other name: Augustine
- Occupations: Educator; Physicist; Mathematician; Researcher
- Children: 5

Awele Augustine Maduemezia (7 August 1934 – 20 February 2018) was a Nigerian professor of Physics, mathematician, researcher and educator. He was former Vice Chancellor of Ambrose Alli University. He also served as president of the Nigerian Association of Mathematical Physics.

In 1995, he was elected as president of the Nigerian Academy of Science to succeed Professor Anthony Afolabi Adegbola. He died in February 2018.

== Early life ==
Awele Augustine Maduemezia was born in Bukuru, Dorowa Babuje, Jos, Plateau State in 1934. He was the second child of Mgotubo Selina Onyebashi and Chisimbili Charles Maduemezia. They were both natives of Asaba situated in Delta State but Mgotubo was from Umu-Agu while Chisimbili was from Umu-Daike. Awele spent his early years in the then Northern Region of Nigeria until 1945 when he returned with his father to Asaba. He attended Government School, Asaba in 1946, Holy Cross School, Lagos (1947–1948), St Patrick's College, Asaba (1949–1953) and University of Ibadan, Ibadan (1954–1959, 1960–1961). He left Nigeria in 1962 to start his PhD programme in Theoretical Physics at the Massachusetts Institute of Technology (MIT), Cambridge, United States. He obtained his PhD in 1965 after only three years, a record at that time.

== Career ==
After completing his PhD programme, he returned to Nigeria in 1965 with his first wife, Late Bibiana Ajoke, who he wedded in the same year. They moved to Enugu State where he worked as an assistant lecturer and lecturer later at the University of Nigeria, Nsukka from 1965 to 1967. In 1967, they moved to Trieste, Italy where he worked as an associate and senior associate at the International Centre for Theoretical Physics (ICTP). At the end of their one-year stay in Trieste, they moved to Ghana in 1968 where he worked as a lecturer at the University of Ghana, Accra for a few years. They returned to Nigeria in 1972, with their first daughter, Isioma. He was a member, Professor of Physics and head of department of the faculty of Science at the University of Ibadan. He was a regional sub-editor of the World Directory of Crystallographers. He was a founding fellow and president of the Nigerian Academy of Science after being elected in 1995 succeeding Professor Anthony Afolabi Adegbola. He was a member of the American Physical Society and President of the Science Association of Nigeria. He was a member of the Ghana Science Association, International Association of Mathematical Physics, Nigerian Institute of Physics, Nigerian Society of Mathematical Sciences and Sigma Xi. He was also the president of the Nigerian Association of Mathematical Physics and the Nigerian Mathematical Society. He was a former Vice Chancellor of Bendel State University (now Ambrose Alli University), Ekpoma, and a former Special Assistant to the Minister of Science & Technology in Nigeria. Recently before his death in 2018, he was an Environmental Pollution expert, consulting for various local and international organizations. He contributed articles on Mathematical Physics and Science Education to professional publications.

== Personal life ==
Awele was married twice and had five biological children with a stepson (Eleojo). Awele married Late Bibiana Ajoke in June 1965. They had three children, daughters named Isioma, Obiageli and Ezinwa. He had a second marriage when he married Dr (Mrs) Celina Peters in 1995. The union would last for 23 years until his demise. Prior to marriage, Awele had two sons, Chike and Amaechi from previous relationships. Awele had seven children-in-law and ~20 grandchildren.

== Final years and death ==
After his retirement, Awele relocated to his hometown Asaba in 2017. He died in February 2018 at the age of 83 from natural causes. A funeral mass was performed at the Catholic Church of Assumption, Zappa, Asaba, Delta State in April 2018. He was buried in his hometown, Asaba, Delta State.
