= Gabriel Babatunde Ogunmola =

Nigeria professor in chemistry oyo State

- Born: Oyo State, Nigeria
- Citizenship: Nigerian
- Occupations: educator; chemist; researcher

Gabriel Babatunde Ogunmola is a Nigerian Professor of Chemistry and Chancellor of Lead City University, Ibadan.

== Education and career ==
Professor Ogunmola obtained a bachelor's and doctorate in chemistry from the University of Ibadan in 1965 and 1968 respectively. In July 1968, he joined the department of Chemistry, University of Ibadan, as a postdoctoral research fellow, and in 1969, he left the UI to join the University of Pennsylvania as a postdoctoral research fellow at the Johnson Research Foundation, Department of Biophysics and Medical Physics. In 1970, he returned to the University of Ibadan as an academic staff member in the department of chemistry, where he became a full professor in 1980 and in 1983, he was appointed Dean, Faculty of Science, Olabisi Onabanjo University, the then Ogun State University. In 1981, he was elected as a fellow of the Nigerian Academy of Science, and in January 2003, he was elected president of the Nigerian Academy of Science to succeed Professor Alexander Animalu. In 2005, he retired from the University of Ibadan, and in 2004, prior to his retirement, he was appointed as a member of the Honorary Presidential Advisory Council on Science and Technology to the President of Nigeria.

== Personal life ==
Professor Ogunmola is the father of Nike Adeyemi, a Nigerian pastor, author, and humanitarian. She is a co-pastor at Daystar Christian Centre, founder of the Real Woman Foundation, and married to Sam Adeyemi.
