= The Last Duty =

1976 novel by Isidore Okpewho

The Last Duty is a 1976 novel by Nigerian author Isidore Okpewho. The narrative is set during the Nigerian Civil War (1967–1970) and focuses on the experiences of civilians in the Urhobo-speaking area of the Mid-Western Region. Literary criticism notes that the work examines the position of minority ethnic groups who were caught between the federal forces of Nigeria and the secessionist state of Biafra, suffering violence, stigma and displacement from both sides.

== Publication ==
The novel was first published in 1976 by Longman Group Limited as part of its Drumbeat series.

== Style ==
Several narrators describe events in the first person, giving sometimes-contradictory accounts in their own distinctive styles reflective of their personalities. The scholar Eustace Palmer describes it as the first African novel to make such heavy use of narrative point of view as a literary technique, such that "the reader is expected to build up his or her own picture of the complex truth through a resolution of the conflicting points of view".

Felicia Annin and Cynthia Osei compare Okpewho's style of social criticism to Juvenal's satires.

== Major themes ==
Eustace Palmer describes Okpewho as "possibly the most interesting of all the Nigerian novelists who have written about the Biafran war", arguing that The Last Duty's "real emphasis is on the havoc caused to human relationships" by war, and especially "the mental, physical, and emotional torture to which women were exposed". Don Emenike and Success Asuzu use the novel as a case study of women's sexual exploitation of during the war. Chukwuka Nwachukwu and Urama Nwachukwu consider the novel's treatment of sexual violence as a possible source of nihilism in reaction to the war, but ultimately argue that the novel's attitude is absurdist rather than nihilist. I.A. Emenyi also examines the ability of patriarchy to deform the woman and affirms the centrality of choice as the basic weapon in her struggle for meaningful existence in the new millennium.

Funsho Aiyejina describes the novel as a "metaphor of a failed marriage, this time, the political marriage between the various ethnic groups in Nigeria". Abdullahi Ismaila argues that the novel can be interpreted as "a metaphorical representation of the relations of oppression and repression of the Biafrans or rebels by the Federal Army or might, of the less privileged, the weak and the vulnerable". According to Felicia Annin and Cynthia Osei, "Okpewho presents detailed description of the inhuman and devastating issues, including corruption, wickedness, dishonesty and injustices that bedevil society." Ifeoma Oluwaseyi highlights the theme of cabalism and exploitation in the novel, focusing on the unfair treatment and manipulation of the masses by the ruling class during the war. Okpewho, he argues, examines the greed and opportunism of the upper class, which leads to the victimization of the lower class in society. Chidi Amuta notes that the novel touches the "fundamental social bonds and institutions such as marriage and friendship thereby exposing individuals to often difficult moral choices".
