= Francis Idachaba =

Nigerian professor of agricultural economics

Francis Sulemanu Idachaba
- Born: Francis Sulemanu Idachaba; 4 December 1943; Kogi State, Nigeria
- Died: 15 August 2014 (aged 70)
- Occupations: Economist; educationist; researcher
- Years active: 1972–2014
- Awards: NNOM and OFR

Francis Sulemanu Idachaba, NNOM, OFR (4 December 1943 – 15 August 2014) was a Nigerian professor of Agricultural Economics, chairman of the Governing Board of the Nigerian National Merit Award and vice chancellor of Kogi State University. He was the first vice chancellor of the University of Agriculture, Makurdi, a position he held from 1988 to 1995.

== Early life ==
Francis Sulemanu Idachaba was born on 4 December 1943, at Idah, a city in Kogi State, north-central Nigeria. He attended Qua Iboe Mission Primary School in Idah before he was admitted in 1956 to Provincial Secondary School, Okene, where he obtained the West African School Certificate in 1961.

He proceeded to the University of Ibadan, where he received a bachelor's degree in economics. He later attended the University of Chicago, where he, in 1969, received a master's degree in economics. In 1972 he received a doctorate degree in agricultural economics from Michigan State University. In 1981, he became a Fulbright professor of agricultural economics at the University of Ibadan.

== Career ==
He started his academic career as an assistant professor in Michigan State University in 1972. As a scholar, Professor Idachaba ranked among Nigeria's most eminent men of letters. He obtained a B.Sc. in economics from the University of Ibadan in 1967 and an M.A. in the same discipline from the University of Chicago in 1969. After obtaining his doctoral degree in Agricultural Economics from Michigan State University in 1972, he commenced a productive career as a lecturer, researcher and consultant in universities and research centres in Nigeria, the United States, Canada, the Hague, the Netherlands and several African countries. The agricultural economist rose to become a professor of Agricultural Economics at the University of Ibadan in 1981.

His output as an intellectual included six published books and over 72 academic papers on diverse issues of agricultural development. He was the Vice-Chancellor of the Federal University of Agriculture, Makurdi, from 1988 to 1995 and also served as vice-chancellor of Kogi State University between 2005 and 2008. He advocated that government should declare agriculture an infant industry and that triangular alliances be formed between government, industry and universities to solve national problems. He was the founder of the Igala Education Foundation in 2001 and F. S. Idachaba Foundation for Research and Scholarship in 2003.
