= Oyewale Tomori =

Nigerian virologist and university administrator

President of the Nigerian Academy of Science 2013

Vice chancellor of Redeemer's University
- In office 2004–2011

Personal details
- Born: 3 February 1946 (age 80) Osun State, Nigeria
- Party: Non-Partisan

Oyewale Tomori (born 3 February 1946) is a Nigerian professor of virology, educational administrator, and former vice chancellor of Redeemer's University. In 2024, he became the chairman of West Africa National Academy of Scientists.

== Life and career ==
Tomori was born in Ilesa, Osun State, Nigeria on 3 February 1946. He received a Doctor of Veterinary Medicine (DVM) from Ahmadu Bello University, Zaria as well as a Doctorate degree, Ph.D in virology from the University of Ibadan, Oyo State, Nigeria where he was appointed professor of virology in 1981, the same year he received the United States Department of Health and Human Services Public Health Service Certificate for contributions to Lassa fever research. Three years (1984) after his appointment as a professor of virology, he was appointed the head of the Department of Virology. At the University of Ibadan Tomori's research focuses on viral infections including Ebola hemorrhagic fever, yellow fever and Lassa fever. He served as the Regional Virologist for the World Health Organization Africa Region (1994–2004) before he was appointed as the first vice chancellor of Redeemer's University, Ogun State, Nigeria, a tenure that ended in 2011.

== Other activities ==
- Global Polio Eradication Initiative (GPEI), Member of the Polio Research Committee (PRC)
- International Consortium on Anti-Virals (ICAV), Member of the International Steering Committee
- Nigeria Expert Review Committee on Polio Eradication and Routine Immunization, Chairman
- World Health Organization, Member of the Strategic Group of Experts on Immunization (SAGE)
- Gavi Alliance, Board Member 2017

== Awards and fellowships ==
He is a recipient of several awards and fellow of many international academic organizations, including:

- Nigeria National Order of Merit (NNOM) (2002), the country's highest award for academic excellence. He is the incumbent President of the Nigerian Academy of Science
- United States Department of Health and Human Services Public Health Service Certificate
- Nigeria National Ministry of Science and Technology Merit Award for excellence in medical research
- Fellow of the Academy of Science of Nigeria.
- Fellow of the College of Veterinary Surgeons of Nigeria
- Fellow of the Royal College of Pathologists of the United Kingdom
- International member of the United States National Academy of Medicine
- Fellow of the American Society of Tropical Medicine and Hygiene (2013)

== Selected works ==
His highest-cited works are:

- The reemergence of Ebola hemorrhagic fever, Democratic Republic of the Congo, 1995
- Yellow fever: a decade of reemergence
- Review of cases of nosocomial Lassa fever in Nigeria: the high price of poor medical practice
- The revised global yellow fever risk map and recommendations for vaccination, 2010: consensus of the Informal WHO Working Group on Geographic Risk for Yellow
- Monoclonal antibodies to lymphocytic choriomeningitis and pichinde viruses: generation, characterization, and cross-reactivity with other arenaviruses

== See also ==
- List of vice chancellors in Nigeria
