= Mabel Segun =

Nigerian writer (1930–2025)

Mabel Segun NNOM
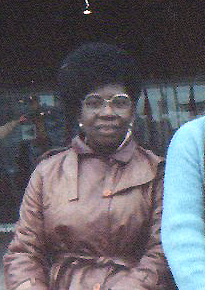
- Segun in Strasbourg, 1983
- Born: 13 February 1930; Ondo City, Colony and Protectorate of Nigeria
- Died: 6 March 2025 (aged 95)
- Education: University of Ibadan
- Occupations: Poet; playwright; children's writer; broadcaster
- Notable work: My Father's Daughter (1965)
- Awards: Nigeria Prize for Literature

Mabel Segun, NNOM (13 February 1930 – 6 March 2025) was a Nigerian poet, playwright and writer of short stories and children's books who was also a teacher, broadcaster, and a sportswoman.

== Biography ==
Born in Ondo City, Nigeria, she had her secondary-school education at CMS Girls' School Lagos. She attended the University of Ibadan, graduating in 1953 with a BA degree in English, Latin and History. She taught these subjects in Nigerian schools, and later became Head of the Department of English and Social Studies and Vice-Principal at the National Technical Teachers' College, Yaba (now Yaba College of Technology).

Her first book, My Father's Daughter, published in 1965, was widely used as a literature text in schools all over the world, and her books have been translated into German, Danish, Norwegian and Greek. Her work is included in the anthology Daughters of Africa (1992).

Segun championed children's literature in Nigeria through the Children's Literature Association of Nigeria, which she founded in 1978, and the Children's Documentation and Research Centre, which she set up in 1990 in Ibadan. She was also a fellow of the International Youth Library in Munich, Germany.

She was a founding member of the Association of Nigerian Authors, established by Chinua Achebe in 1981.

Segun died on 6 March 2025, at the age of 95.

== Awards and honours ==
As a broadcaster, Segun won the Nigerian Broadcasting Corporation 1977 Artiste of the Year award.

In 2009, she received the Nigerian National Order of Merit Award (NNOM) for lifetime achievements.

In 2015, the Society of Young Nigerian Writers under the leadership of Wole Adedoyin founded the Mabel Segun Literary Society, aimed at promoting and reading the works of Mabel Segun.

In 2007, Segun was awarded the LNG Nigeria Prize for Literature.

== Selected bibliography ==
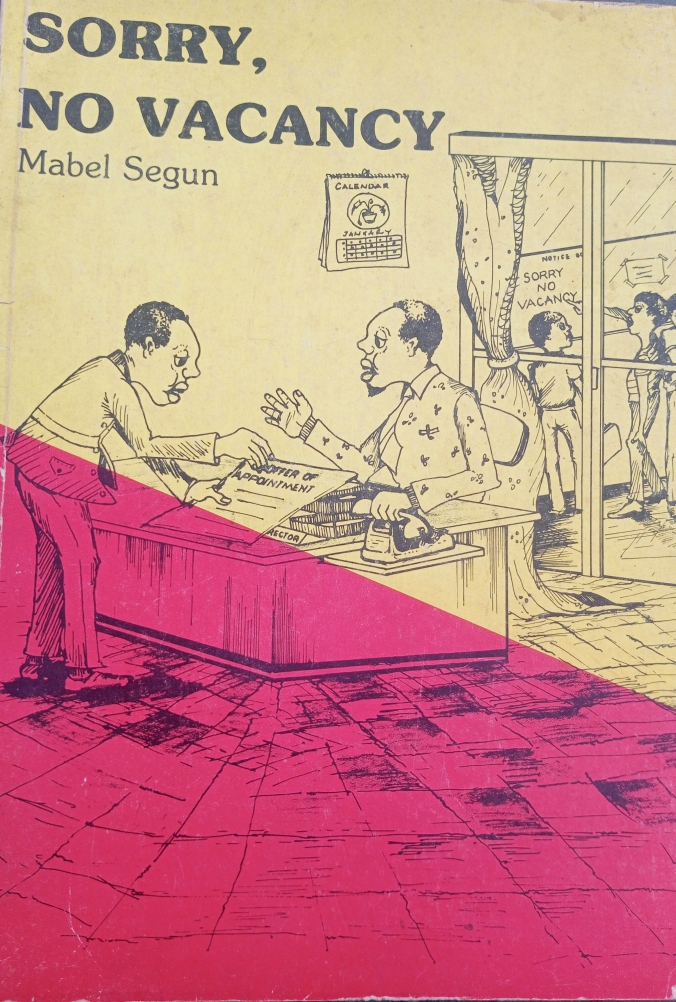
Sorry, No Vacancy.

- My Father's Daughter (1965)
- Under the Mango Tree (co-edited) (1979)
- Youth Day Parade (1984)
- Olu and the Broken Statue (1985)
- Sorry, No Vacancy (1985)
- Conflict and Other Poems (1986)
- My Mother's Daughter (1986)
- Ping-Pong: Twenty-Five Years of Table Tennis (1989)
- The First Corn (1989)
- The Twins and the Tree Spirits (1990)
- The Surrender and Other Stories (1995)
- Readers' Theatre: Twelve Plays for Young People (2006)
- Rhapsody: A Celebration of Nigerian Cooking and Food Culture (2007)
