= Akpanoluo Ikpong Ikpong Ette =

- Born: 23 September 1929; Akwa Ibom State, Nigeria
- Died: 17 September 2018 (aged 88)
- Citizenship: Nigerian
- Occupations: educator; physicist; researcher
- Awards: Nigerian National Order of Merit Award

Akpanoluo Ikpong Ikpong Ette NNOM (23 September 1929 - 17 September 2018) was a Nigerian Professor of Physics and former secretary and vice-president of the Nigerian Academy of Science.

In 1991, he was elected President of the Nigerian Academy of Science to succeed Professor Caleb Olaniyan. In 2003, he received the highest academic award in Nigeria, the Nigerian National Order of Merit Award.

== Life and career ==
Ette was born in Upenekang, and from 1944 to 1948 attended Hope Waddell Training Institution, before studying physics at University College, Ibadan from 1949, graduating with a BSc in 1954. After teaching at Hope Waddell Training Institution from 1954 to 1959, he completed his PhD at the University of Ibadan from 1959 to 1966 while lecturing at the same institution. He was appointed a professor in 1972.

Ette died in 2018.
