= Redeemer's University =

Nigerian private university

- RUN
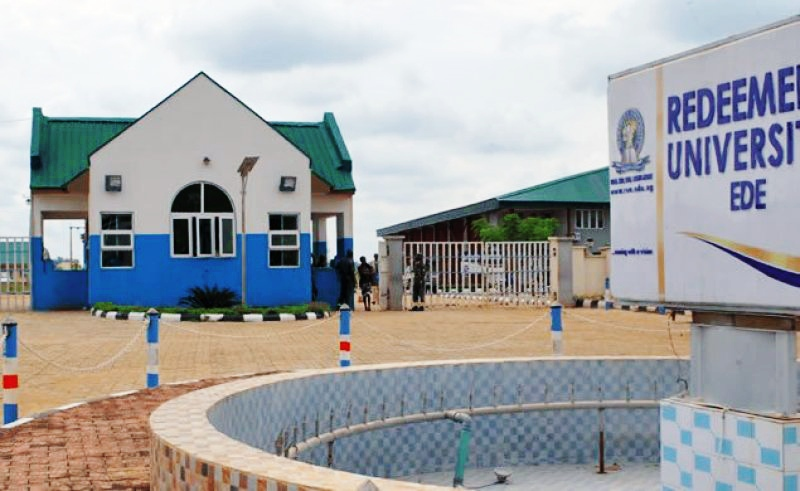
- Main entrance
- Motto: Running with a Vision
- Type: Private undergraduate & postgraduate
- Established: 2005; 21 years ago
- Founder: Redeemed Christian Church of God
- Chancellor: Theophilus Danjuma
- Vice-Chancellor: Shadrach Olufemi Akindele
- Location: Ede, Osun State, Nigeria; 7°40′52″N 4°27′29″E
- Campus: 812 hectares (2,010 acres)
- Colors: Blue, gold & white
- Website: run.edu.ng

Redeemer's University is a private university in Ede, Osun State, Nigeria. Established in 2005, it is owned by the Redeemed Christian Church of God and situated off the Ibadan-Osogbo Road.

== History and governance ==
The university was founded by the Redeemed Christian Church of God in 2005. Headed by the General Overseer, Pastor Enoch Adeboye, a PhD holder in applied mathematics.

The Federal Government of Nigeria granted an operating license to Redeemer's University on 7 January 2005. In order to realize its dream, the Redeemed Christian Church of God, the proprietors of the university, initially acquired a large expanse of land in Ede, Osun state, having obtained the Certificate of Statutory Right of Occupancy in 1997. The site of the university covers an area of about 812 hectares (2,010 acres).

The university took off at the temporary site in the Redemption Camp on 11 October 2005 with 478 students admitted into three colleges. On 1 February 2006, 473 students matriculated into the colleges to pursue bachelor's degrees in various programmes and the university has produced 13 sets of graduates.

=== Vice-chancellors ===
Below is the list of vice-chancellors, from inception:

Redeemer's University list of vice-chancellors
S/N	NAME	PERIOD AS VC	REMARK
1	Oyewale Tomori	2005-2011	Pioneer Vice-Chancellor, Professor of Virology and former World Health Organization Executive for Sub-Saharan Africa; Fellow of the Nigerian Academy of Science.
2	Debo Adeyewa	2011-2018	Professor of Meteorology, Federal University of Technology Akure Ondo State, Nigeria.
3	Anthony Enisan Akinlo	2018–2023	Professor of Monetary and Development Economics.
4	Shadrach Akindele	2023- present	Professor of Forestry.

== Academics ==
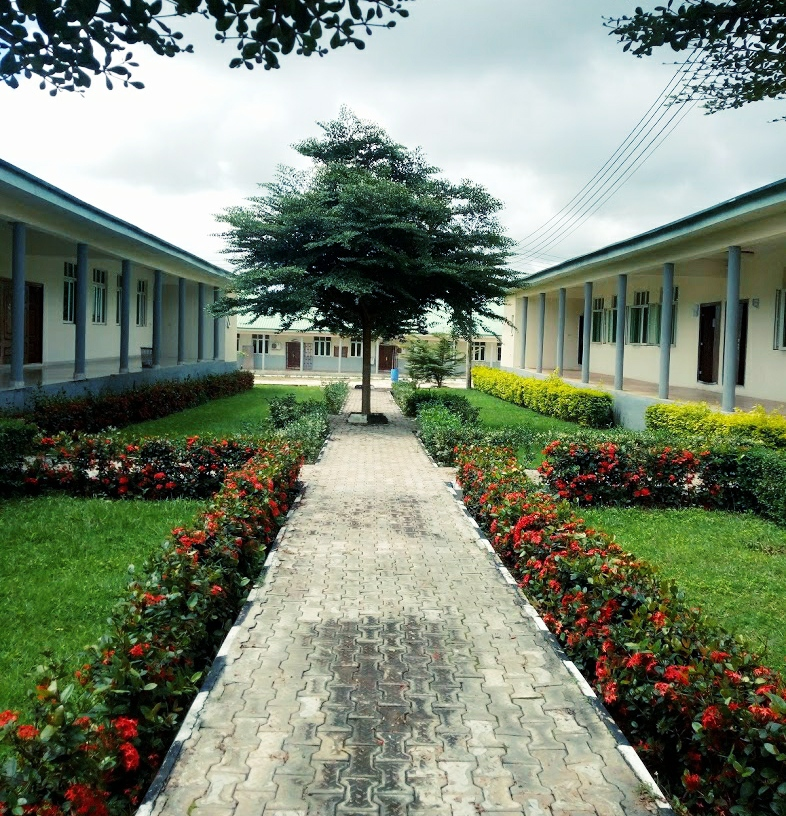
A garden between lecture rooms

The university runs both undergraduate and postgraduate programmes. In the 2019/2020 Academic Session, the university changed from the Collegiate system to the Faculty system.

== Notable faculty ==
- Ahmed Yerima, professor
- Christian Happi, professor

== Notable alumni ==
- Kiddominant, music producer
- Debo Macaroni, comedian
- Judikay, Nigerian gospel singer
- Elma Mbadiwe, actress
