= Isidore Okpewho =

Nigerian novelist and critic (1941–2016)

Isidore Okpewho NNOM
- Born: 9 November 1941; Agbor, Delta State, Nigeria
- Died: 4 September 2016 (aged 74); Binghamton, New York, US
- Known for: Novelist; critic; scholar; classicist
- Notable work: The Victims (1970); The Last Duty (1976); Tides (1993); The Epic in Africa (1979); Myth in Africa (1983)

Isidore Okpewho, NNOM (9 November 1941 – 4 September 2016), was a Nigerian novelist and critic. He won the 1976 African Arts Prize for Literature, and the 1993 Commonwealth Writers' Prize, Best Book Africa.

Also a classicist and scholar, he has been described as one of the most brilliant men of his generation and one of Nigeria's most iconic literary figures. His academic career took him to the US, where he lived with his wife and four children since 1991 until his death, in Binghamton, New York. According to Professor G. G. Darah of the Nigerian Oral Literature Association (NOLA), Okpewho "will be best remembered for his original contribution to the discourse of oral literature and epics. The value of his scholarship in this area is comparable to that of Professor Cheikh Anta Diop of Senegal on Egyptian sciences and philosophy, Professor Samir Amin of Egypt on African political economy, Professor Ali Mazrui of Kenya on African history, and Professor John Henrik Clarke on African American history and arts."

== Early life and education ==
Isidore Okpewho was born in Agbor, Delta State, Nigeria. His Urhobo father, David Okpewho, was from Abraka, in Delta State, a retired senior laboratory technician, and his Igbo mother was from Asaba.

Okpewho attended St Patrick's College in Asaba, going on to University College, Ibadan, from where he earned a first-class Honours degree in Classics. He obtained his PhD in comparative literature from the University of Denver (1976) and a D.Litt. in the humanities from the University of London (2000).

== Career ==
His early career began with working at the Federal Ministry of Education, the Federal Ministry of External Affairs, and the Longman publishers, where he served as an editor for eight years.

Subsequently, pursuing his doctorate in the US, he became an academic there, teaching at the University at Buffalo, The State University of New York from 1974 to 1976, University of Ibadan from 1976 to 1990, Harvard University from 1990 to 1991, and Binghamton University.

He was a fellow at the Woodrow Wilson International Center for Scholars in 1982, Alexander von Humboldt Foundation in 1982, Center for Advanced Study in the Behavioral Sciences in 1988, the W.E.B. Du Bois Institute in 1990, National Humanities Center in 1997, and 2003 Guggenheim Fellowship.

He also served as President of the International Society for the Oral Literatures of Africa (ISOLA).

Okpewho died aged 74 on 4 September 2016 in hospital in Binghamton, New York, where he had lived and taught since 1991. Survived by his wife Obiageli Okpewho and children Ediru, Ugo, Afigo, and Onome, he was buried in Gate of Heaven Cemetery, East Hanover, New Jersey, on 18 September.

== Writing and scholarship ==
Prolific in his output, Okpewho wrote, co-wrote and edited some 14 books, dozens of articles and a seminal booklet, A Portrait of the Artist as a Scholar (an inaugural lecture delivered at the Faculty of Education Lecture Theatre, University of Ibadan, on 18 May 1989).

He was the author of four respected novels, which are widely studied in Africa and other parts of the world, and translated into other languages: The Victims (1970), The Last Duty (1976, winner in manuscript of the African Arts Prize for Literature, an international competition organized by the African Arts Center, UCLA), Tides (1993, winner of that year's Commonwealth Writers' Prize, Africa region), and Call Me By My Rightful Name (2004).

As a scholar and proponent of oral literature in Africa, he was particularly noted for his seminal academic monographs The Epic in Africa: Toward a Poetics of the Oral Performance (1979) and Myth in Africa: A Study of its Aesthetic and Cultural Relevance (1983). In the words of Niyi Osundare:

"Novelist, poet, folklorist, scholar, and university administrator, Okpewho was a Jack of many trades and master of all, who left his mind-prints on virtually every aspect of African literature and literary studies. With his foundational books, The Epic in Africa and Myth in Africa, Okpewho summoned all his scholarly prowess as a truly First Class Classics scholar and carved out a niche for African oral lore and its inexhaustible possibilities at a time when virtually every claim to high culture and intellectual accomplishment was denied to the 'Dark Continent.'"

The many honours accorded Okpewho included fellowships in the humanities from the Woodrow Wilson International Center for Scholars (1982), Alexander von Humboldt Foundation (1982), Center for Advanced Study in the Behavioral Sciences at Stanford University (1988), the W.E.B. Du Bois Institute at Harvard University (1990), National Humanities Center in North Carolina (1997), and the Simon Guggenheim Memorial Foundation (2003). He was also elected Folklore Fellow International by the Finnish Academy of the Sciences in Helsinki (1993).

== Selected awards ==
- 1972: Winner of the African Arts Prize for Literature, for manuscript of The Last Duty
- 1993: Winner of Commonwealth Writers' Prize (Africa), for Tides
- 1998: Dean's Award for Honors Teaching Excellence, SUNY Binghamton
- 2010: Nigerian National Order of Merit (NNOM) in humanities

== Bibliography ==
=== Novels ===
- The Victims, Longman, 1970, ISBN 978-0-582-64075-7. US editions: Garden City: Doubleday Anchor, 1971; Washington, DC: Three Continents, 1980
- The Last Duty Longman, 1976; 1986, ISBN 978-0-582-78535-9
- Tides, Longman, 1993, ISBN 978-0-582-10276-7
- Call Me By My Rightful Name, Africa World Press, 2004, ISBN 978-1-59221-191-3

=== Selected non-fiction ===
- The Epic in Africa: Toward a Poetics of the Oral Performance, Columbia University Press, 1979, ISBN 978-0-231-04400-4
- Myth in Africa: A Study of Its Aesthetic and Cultural Relevance. CUP Archive. 1983. ISBN 978-0-521-27476-0.
- A Portrait of the Artist as a Scholar: An Inaugural Lecture Delivered at the Faculty of Education Lecture Theatre, University of Ibadan, Thursday, 18 May 1989, Longman Nigeria, 1990 (35pp.), ISBN 9789781397257.
- African Oral Literature: Backgrounds, Character, and Continuity. Indiana University Press. 1992. ISBN 978-0-253-20710-4.
- Once Upon a Kingdom: Myth, Hegemony, and Identity. Indiana University Press. 1998. ISBN 978-0-253-21189-7.
- Blood on the Tides: The Ozidi Saga and Oral Epic Narratology, Rochester Studies in African History and the Diaspora, University of Rochester Press, 2014, ISBN 978-1580464871
