= Federal Polytechnic, Ede =

Polytechnic in Nigeria, Osun State

Location
- Ajeniju Laoye Street, Loogun, Osun; Nigeria, Osun state, 232101

Information
- School type: Public
- Established: 1992
- Rector: Dr. Sani Manyahaya
- Campuses: Ede North and Ede South campus
- Campus type: Rural
- Website: https://www.federalpolyede.edu.ng/indexMain.php

Federal Polytechnic, Ede is a Nigerian tertiary institution that was established in 1992. It is located in Ede, a town in Osun State, southwestern Nigeria. It is a National Diploma and Higher National Diploma awarding institution.

== Rector ==
In December 2022, the former president of Nigeria, Muhammadu Buhari, appointed Dr Sani Manyahaya as the 6th substantial Rector of the school.

== Admission requirements ==
Any student or aspirant seeking admission into the Federal Polytechnic Ede must have a 5 credit pass in SSCE (WAEC, NECO, NABTEB) O level and also score a minimum mark of 150 in JAMB (UTME).

== Matriculation ==
On 22 May 2023, the school marked its 29th matriculation ceremony in which 8,982 newly-admitted students into various departments.

=== 30th matriculation ceremony ===
On 22 March 2024, the school marked its 30th matriculation ceremony in which 9,150 new students were admitted to various faculty in the school.

== Courses offered ==
- Accountancy
- Agric and Bio-environmental engineering technology
- Architectural Technology
- Banking and Finance
- Basic Studies
- Building Technology
- Business Administration
- Civil Engineering Technology
- Computer Science
- Computer Engineering Technology
- Estate Management
- Electrical Electronics Engineering Technology
- Fashion Design and Textile Technology
- General Studies
- Geological Technology
- Horticulture and Landscape Technology
- Hospitality Management
- Leisure and Tourism
- Library and Information Science
- Marketing
- Mechanical Engineering
- Nutrition and Dietetics
- Office Technology and Management
- Quantity Survey
- Science Laboratory Technology
- Statistics
- Survey and Geo-informatics
