= Nigerian Association of Mathematical Physics =

Logo

The Nigerian Association of Mathematical Physics is a professional academic association of Nigerian mathematical physicists. The association is governed by its Council, which is chaired by the association's President, according to a set of Statutes and Standing Orders.

== Notable members ==
- Professor Awele Maduemezia

Professor Garba Babaji
