= Christian Happi =

Professor of Molecular Biology and Genomics

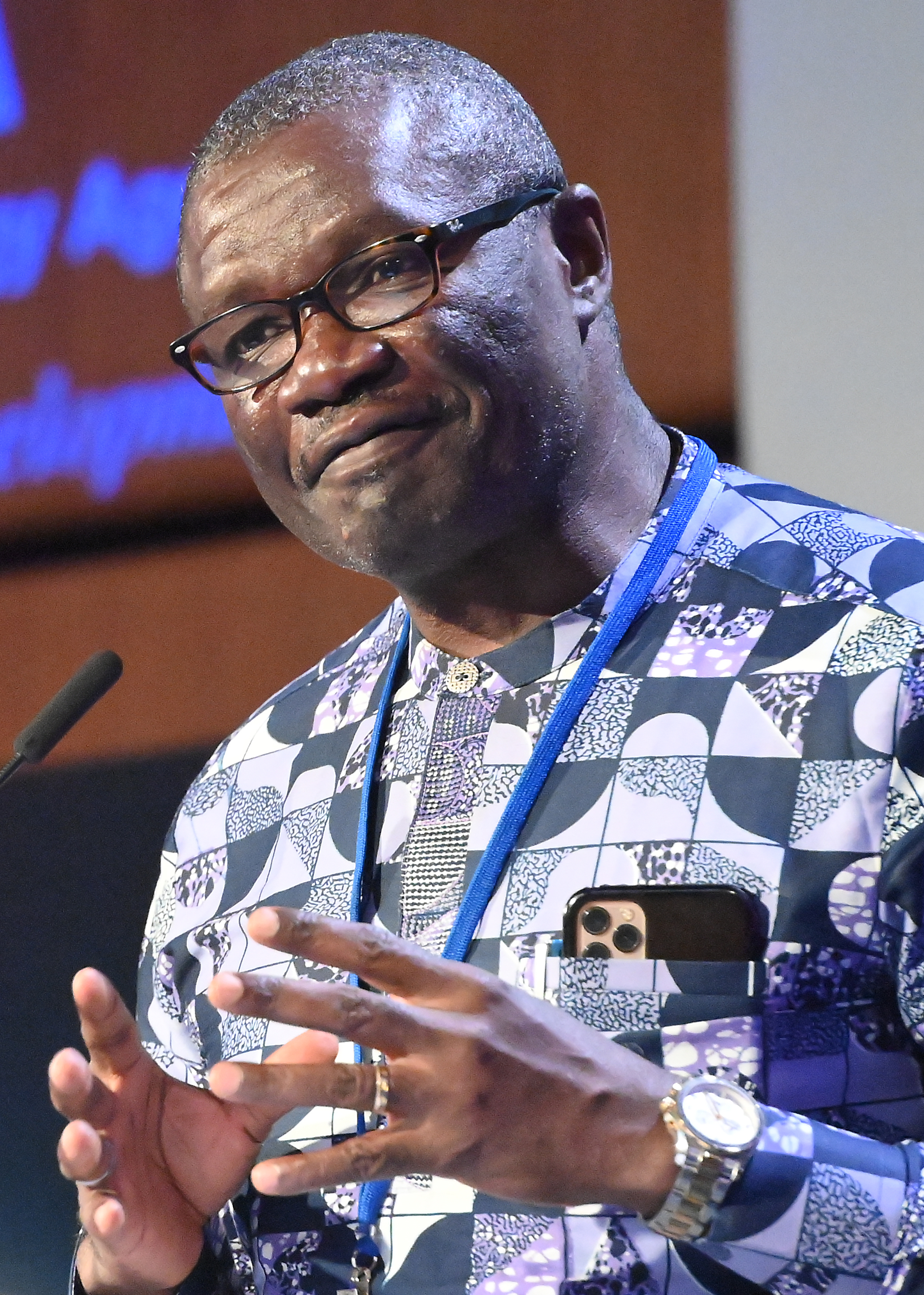
Christian Happi in 2021

Christian Happi is a Distinguished Professor of Molecular Biology and Genomics in the Department of Biological Sciences and the Director of the Institute of Genomics and Global Health (formerly African Centre of Excellence for Genomics of Infectious Diseases), both at Redeemer’s University. He is known for leading the team of scientists that used genomic sequencing to identify a single point of infection from an animal reservoir to a human in the Ebola outbreak in West Africa. His research focus is on infectious diseases, including malaria, Lassa fever, Ebola virus disease, HIV, and SARS-CoV-2. Christian Happi has been described as a force of nature in TIME's 100 Most Influential People of 2025.

== Early life and education ==
Professor Happi was born in Sangmélima, Cameroon, fourth of eight children. He graduated from the University of Yaounde, Cameroon, in 1993 with a Bachelor of Science in Biochemistry with honors. He obtained his PhD from the University of Ibadan, Nigeria, in 2000 and went on to Harvard University as a Postdoctoral Fellow from 2000 to 2003. He subsequently worked at Harvard University as a Research Scientist from 2004 to 2007. He became an adjunct Professor at Harvard University School of Public Health between 2007–2011.

== Research and career ==
Happi has led several public health sequencing efforts in Africa. His team rapidly sequenced Nigeria’s first Ebola case, and up to 20 cases a day throughout the outbreak. He sequenced Lassa fever strains in a 2018 outbreak, helping researchers to conclude that the Lassa fever outbreak was due to spread by rats, rather than a mutation which had made it easier to spread between people. He also played significant roles in genomics efforts such as 1000 Genomes Project and H3Africa. More recently he has led efforts for SARS-CoV-2 in Nigeria.Professor Happi in an extraordinary way, used next generation sequencing technology to perform the first sequence of the new SARS-CoV-2 in Africa, within 48 hours of receiving sample of the first case in Nigeria.

In 2020 he gave a TED talk called A virus detection network to stop the next pandemic.

=== Awards and honors ===
His awards and honors include;

- 2025 TIME's 100 Most Influential people of 2025
- 2020 Bailey K. Ashford Medal
- 2019 HUGO African Prize
- 2011 & 2012, ExxonMobil Malaria Leadership Fellow
- 2011, Merle A. Sande Health Leadership Award
- 2010, Scholarship to Second Annual Course on Point-of-Care Diagnostics for Global Health, University of Washington Seattle (USA)
- 2010, Boroughs Wellcome and Bill & Melinda Gates Awards, Genome Epidemiology Meeting (GEM), Wellcome Trust Conference Centre, Hinxton (UK)
- 2009 – 2014, Wellcome Trust Research Grant Award
- 2009, European Union-Developing Countries Clinical Trials Partnership (EDCTP) Senior Research Fellowship Award (The Hague, Netherlands)
- 2008, Chair, Scientific Advisory Committee Africa Health Research Organization (AHRO) (Ghana)
- 2007, Turner Biosciences Research Award (USA)
- 2005 – 2008, Plasmodium falciparum Pathogenesis and Applied Genomics Research Award, World Bank/UNICEF/WHO/TDR
- 2004, Chair, Molecular Parasitology session, 50th Annual Meeting and Anniversary of the ASTMH, Philadelphia, Pennsylvania, USA
- 2003 – 2005, Member of the International Scientific Committee of the 4th MIM Pan African conference on Malaria (Cameroon)
- 1999, Best Postgraduate Student, PIMRAT, College of Medicine, University of Ibadan, Ibadan, Nigeria
- 1998, Wellcome Trust Award to the 1st Gordon Conference on Malaria (Oxford, UK)
- 1995, Best International Postgraduate Student, International Student association (ISA), University of Ibadan, Nigeria
- 1994 – 1997, Organization of African Unity (OAU) Research and Training Scholarship
- 1988 – 1993, Cameroon Government Scholarship
