= Debo Adeyewa =

Nigerian academic

Prof. Debo Adeyewa

Vice-Chancellor of Redeemer's University Nigeria
- In office 2011 – Sept 2018
- Preceded by: Prof. Tomori
- Succeeded by: Prof. Anthony Akinlo

Personal details
- Born: Debo Adeyewa Osun State
- Education: University of Ife
- Occupation: Academic; author

Debo Adeyewa is a Nigerian academic, administrator and author. He was the former Vice chancellor of the Redeemer's University Nigeria. He succeeded in moving the University to its permanent location.
