= Adedeji Adeleke =

Nigerian politician

Chief Deji Adeleke
- Born: March 6, 1957 (age 69); Nigeria
- Education: Western Kentucky University (BSc)
- Occupations: Business magnate; Education administrator
- Known for: Founder and president of Adeleke University
- Title: CEO of Pacific Holdings Limited
- Children: Davido
- Relatives: Ademola Adeleke (brother)

Adedeji Tajudeen Adeleke (born 6 March 1957) is a Nigerian business magnate and president of Adeleke University.

Adeleke is also the CEO of Pacific Holdings Limited. He is the father of Davido, a Nigerian musician. He was married to Dr. Vero Adeleke who died on 6 March 2003. He is the elder brother of Ademola Adeleke, the current governor of Osun State.

== Education ==
In 1979, Adeleke obtained a Bachelor of Science degree in Finance from Western Kentucky University.
