= Enkay Ogboruche =

- Also known as: Enkay
- Genres: Christian Hip Hop; Urban contemporary gospel; Contemporary Christian Music; Contemporary worship music; Gospel
- Occupations: Singer-songwriter; worship leader; musician
- Years active: 2008–present
- Label: Tehila Records
- Website: enkaymusic.com

Enkay Ogboruche known professionally as Enkay, is a Nigerian gospel singer, songwriter, and worship leader. She is known for her contemporary gospel recordings and for her participation in worship events in Nigeria and internationally. She started singing at the age of 10, at the Assemblies of God choir, and later launched a solo music career, releasing her debut album The Kingdom Anthem in 2015. She subsequently released The Bridge (2018) and Declaration (2023), the latter marking her tenth anniversary in gospel music.

== Career ==
Enkay is a soprano singer. She was a member of the Tehila Crew, a gospel singing group. She took off in 2014 as a solo artist with a debut album The Kingdom Anthem. The Kingdom Anthem was a 10-track album that was distributed by Honesty Music, with popular track like "Yes, You Are The Lord".

Her second album, The Bridge, was released in 2018 at the Enkay Live in Concert which held at The Eko Convention Center with the like of Kierra Sheard, Chioma Jesus, Frank Edwards, Sammy Okposo, and a host of many other gospel music artists. The Bridge contains her hit track "Salute". She has collaborated with other gospel music artists in Nigeria and internationally.

In 2024, Enkay performed at the One Voice, One Hope: A Global Mosaic of Praise concert hosted in collaboration with Liberty University and Tehila Records. The event united worship leaders from across the world and formed part of the annual Global CEOs Summit hosted by Liberty University. At the concert, she was reported as the first Nigerian to lead worship at the event, alongside internationally acclaimed artists including Michael W. Smith. The event aimed to celebrate the diversity and power of praise from across nations and to amplify African voices in gospel music.

In a 2025 interview with The Nation, Enkay stated that she has released three albums and numerous singles, and that she was working on her fourth album. She has worked with several international gospel artists, including collaborations with American and African musicians. In that interview, Enkay mentioned working with American Grammy-winning artist Kierra Sheard and Nigerian and African artists such as Pastor Nathaniel Bassey, Canton Jones, Evelyn Wanjiru, and MOG Music, which she said expanded her reach and shaped her musical versatility.

== Artistic initiatives ==
Enkay, in The Nation interview, described that the growth of various worship platforms she has created, such as the Pneuma Worship Experience, Alabanza, and Praise Flame, have brought people together in worship.

She has also served as a judge on the gospel music competition Spotlight, where she said she had opportunities to discover and mentor young gospel talents.

== Personal life ==
Enkay Ogboruche was born into a family of seven. Her birth name is Nkiruka Gift Onuabuobi and was born in Kaduna State in northern Nigeria. She has four siblings: two brothers and two sisters, and she is the first born child. She began singing at the age of 10. Her first recording experience was with a bottle and a spoon in a recording with her father. In her teenage years, she became a born-again Christian. Enkay is married to Dr. Timothy Ogboruche and they have three boys.

== Discography ==
=== Albums ===
- Kingdom Anthem (2015)
- The Bridge (2018)
- Declaration (2023)

== Videography ==
- Jehovah – Tehila Crew (2012)
- Yes You are the Lord (2016)
- You are Amazing (2016)
- Merciful God ft Mabongi Mabaso (2017)
- Salute ft Kierra Sheard (2018)
- Morning Dew (2019)
- Never Change (2019)
- Nkemakolam (2019)
