= Ede, Osun State =

Town in Osun State, Nigeria

Ẹdẹ
- Short oral history of Ede in Ede language by a native speaker
- Ede shown within Nigeria
- Coordinates: 7°44′20″N 4°26′10″E
- Country: Nigeria
- State: Osun State
- LGAs: Ede North; Ede South

Area
  - Total: 862 km^{2} (333 sq mi)
- Elevation: 269 m (883 ft)

Population
  - Total: 159,866
  - Density: 185/km^{2} (480/sq mi)
- Time zone: UTC+1 (WAT)

Ẹdẹ is a town in Osun State, southwestern Nigeria. It lies along the Osun River at a point on the railroad from Lagos, 180 kilometres (110 mi) southwest, and at the intersection of roads from Oshogbo, Ogbomosho, and Ile-Ife. The two (2) local government areas in Ẹdẹ are Ẹdẹ South and Ẹdẹ North. There are three (3) major tertiary institutions in Ẹdẹ, which makes the town one of the fastest growing towns in the south-west with an increasing literacy rate. The Federal Polytechnic Ẹdẹ, Adeleke University, and Redeemer's University are among the institutions.

Ẹdẹ is a predominantly Muslim town with about 75% of the population. This can be traced back to 19th century during the reign of Timi Abibu Lagunju as the king of Ẹdẹ, who is the first Muslim Oba in Yorubaland given the fact that he was already on the throne for a few years when in November 1857, the Baptist missionary W. H. Clark visited Ẹdẹ. Clarke recorded thus: "This young follower of the Prophet (Prophet Muhammad), a short time since became the ruler of this town in the place of his father (Oduniyi), the deceased, and brings with him into office, the influence of his new religion (Islam)."

== Local government in Ede ==
Ede Town has two Local government areas which are;

- Ede South
- Ede North

== Climate ==
Ede has a Tropical wet and dry, savanna climate . The Town yearly temperature is 29.22 °C (84.6 °F) and it is -0.24% lower than Nigeria's averages.

== Music ==
Ede is rumored to be the birthplace of Apala music.

== Notable people ==
- Ademola adeleke
- Munirudeen Adesola Lawal (king)
- Siyan Oyeweso
- Adedeji Aderemi (late)
- Mubarak Adekilekun Tijani

== See also ==
- Federal Polytechnic, Ede
- Redeemer's University, Ede
- Adeleke University, Ede
