= Immaculate Conception College =

Coordinates: 54.984°N 7.307°W

Location
- Trench Road; Waterside, Derry, County Londonderry, BT47 2DS; Northern Ireland

Information
- School type: Secondary, maintained
- Denomination: Roman Catholic
- Established: 1966
- Principal: Frank Orr
- Chaplain: Michael McCaughey
- Teaching staff: 16 (as of 2006-07)
- Gender: Mixed
- Age range: 11-16
- Enrolment: 239 (as of 2006-07)
- Student to teacher ratio: 14.85 (as of 2006-07)
- Slogan: Educating for Life
- Website: Official webpage

Immaculate Conception College was a Roman Catholic secondary school situated in Waterside, Derry, Northern Ireland, catering for students from the ages of 11–19. The school was closed and demolished in 2014.

== History ==
Saint Brecan's Boys and Saint Brecan's Girls' Secondary Schools (named after the 5th-century Saint Brecan) were opened on 1 September 1966. This marked an historic occasion in the present-day parish of Ardmore. The schools were built by the local firm of Frank Connor Builders. The boys who formed the first intake of pupils included those who previously attended St. Patrick's Primary School, Pennyburn. This was because there was no secondary school provision for them until St Brigid's College, Carnhill, opened in 1974.

The Boys’ and Girls’ schools were run entirely separate, sharing the same entrance gates. Soon developing into a 11-16 schools offering CSE and GCE courses to its pupils, with those who wished to continue their education post 16 (following ROSLA) transferring to either the North West Technical College or to St Columb's College. On 1 September 1984, St. Brecan's High School was created with the amalgamation of the boys' and girls' schools and, on 25 November 2003, the school became Immaculate Conception College.

== Former principals ==
- Mr. Sean B. O'Kelly (boys' school, 1966–1968)
- Miss Maureen McGranaghan (girls' school, 1966–1978)
- Mr. John (Jack) Austin (boys' school, 1968–1982)
- Mr. Pádraig O'Mianáin (boys' school, 1982–1984)
- Miss Brid McGinley (girls' school, acting principal, 1977–1979)
- Mr. Brendan Flannery (girls' school, 1979–1984; amalgamated school, 1984–1990)
- Mr. Paul Molloy (1990-2004)
