= Adeleke University =

Private university in Ede, Nigeria

- Motto: Education, Excellence And Character
- Type: Private
- Established: 2011
- Religious affiliation: Seventh-day Adventist Church
- Chancellor: Ibekwe C. Egbuta
- President: Adedeji Adeleke
- Vice-Chancellor: Solomon Ajayi Adebola
- Pro-Chancellor: Adedeji Adeleke
- Location: Ede, Osun State, Nigeria; 7.7600°N 4.4625°E
- Campus: 520 acres (2.1 km^{2})
- Colors: Royal blue and yellow
- Website: www.adelekeuniversity.edu.ng

The Adeleke University is a privately-owned institution located in Ede, a town in Osun State, southwestern Nigeria. It was established by Chief Adedeji Adeleke in 2011 through the Springtime Development Foundation (SDF).

It is part of the Seventh-day Adventist Education System

== Faculties and Academic programmes ==
Adeleke University offers undergraduate and postgraduate programmes through several faculties and academic departments. The courses are accredited by the National Universities Commission (NUC) of Nigeria.

=== Faculty of Science ===
- Biology
- Chemistry
- Computer Science
- Industrial Mathematics
- Physics
- Microbiology

=== Faculty of Social and Management Sciences ===
- Accounting
- Banking and Finance
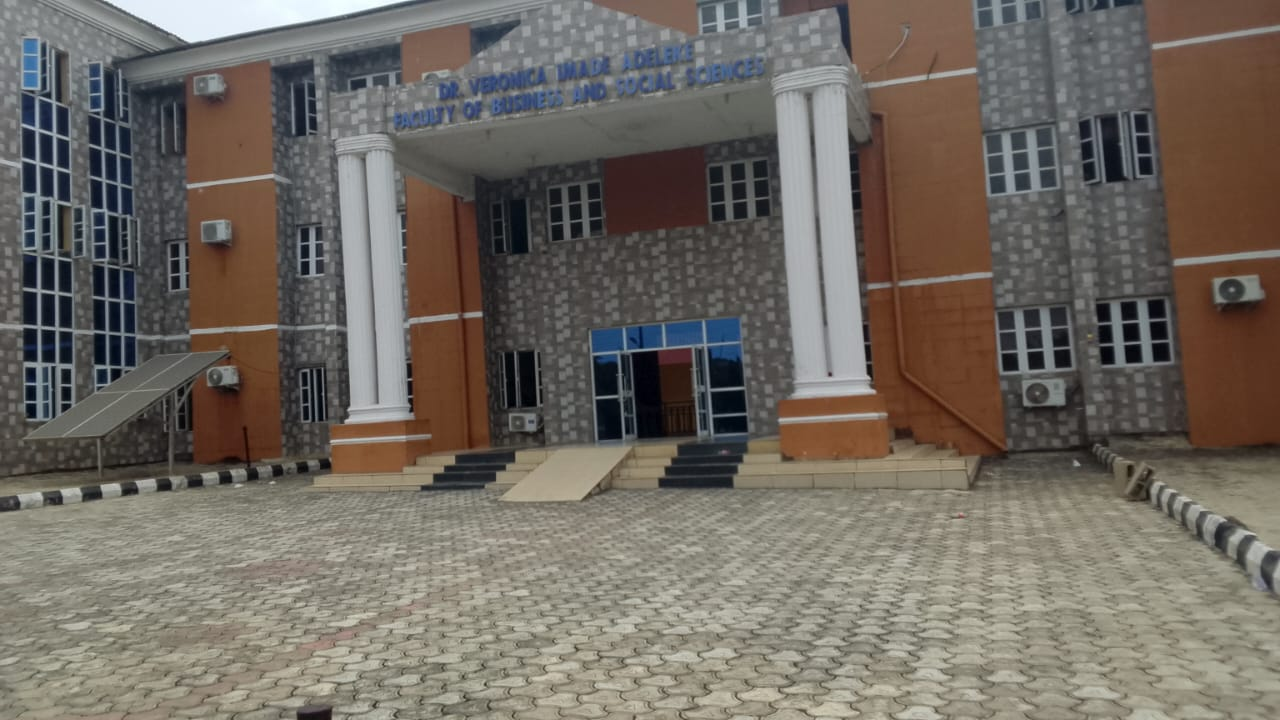
- Faculty of Social science
  Business Administration
- Economics
- Mass Communication
- Political Science and International Relations
- Sociology

=== Faculty of Arts and Humanities ===
- English Language and Literature
- History and International Studies
- Religious and Cultural Studies

=== Faculty of Education ===
- Science Education
- Education Management
- Educational Foundations

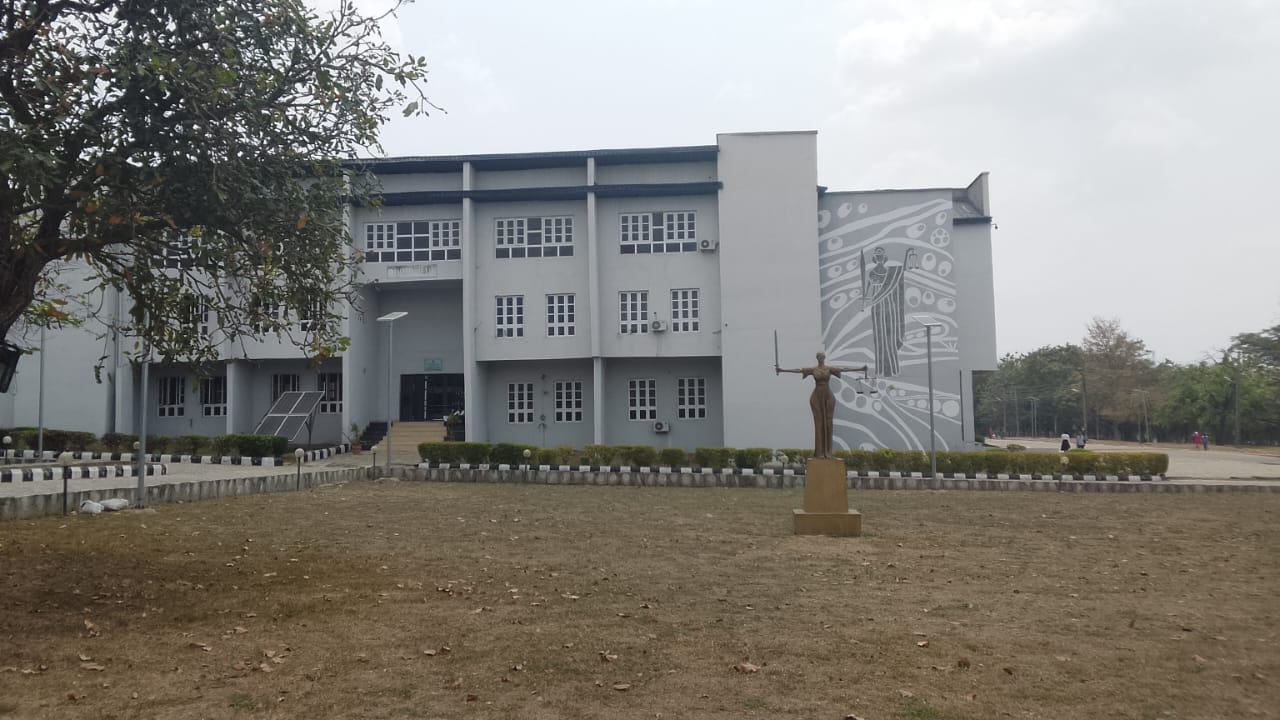
Faculty of Law building

=== Faculty of Law ===
- Law (LL.B)

=== Faculty of Environmental Sciences ===
- Estate Management
- Geography and Environmental Management
- Urban and Regional Planning

=== Postgraduate Programmes ===
Adeleke University also offers postgraduate degrees (Master’s and Ph.D.) and Postgraduate Diplomas (PGD) in selected disciplines across science, social sciences, and humanities.

== Rankings ==
According to the 2025 EduRank university rankings, Adeleke University is ranked:

- 96th in Nigeria
- 623rd in Africa
- 11,489th in the world

EduRank evaluates universities based on research output, non-academic prominence, and the impact of notable alumni.
