= Nigerian Academy of Science =

National academy of sciences for Nigeria

The Nigerian Academy of Science
- Formation: 18 January 1977
- Headquarters: Lagos, Nigeria
- Members: 309 Fellows
- President: Abubakar Sambo

The Nigerian Academy of Science is the official science academy of Nigeria. The academy of science was established on 18 January 1977, as an association of Nigeria's foremost scientists, but incorporated in 1986. It is the apex scientific organization in Nigeria. The Academy acts as a scientific advisor to the Federal Government of Nigeria, funds research fellowships, and scientific start-up companies. The Academy is governed by its council, which is chaired by the academy's president, according to a set of Statutes and Bye-laws. The members of council and the president are elected from, and by its Fellows. The basic members of the Academy are also elected by existing Fellows. There are currently 268 Fellows allowed to use the postnominal title FAS, with not more than 10 new Fellows appointed each year. The current president is Professor Abubakar Sambo, a professor of Energy Studies. The Nigerian Academy of Science is Nigeria's national representative on such bodies as the International Science Council (ISC) – the umbrella body for all science associations and unions – and the InterAcademy Partnership (IAP) – the umbrella body for all national science academies globally. The academy is also a member of the Network of African Science Academies (NASAC).

== Structure and governance ==
The Academy is governed by its council, which is chaired by the academy's president, according to a set of Statutes and Bye-laws. The members of the Council; the president and the other officers are elected from and by its Fellowship.

== Fellows ==
The Academy's core members are the Fellows: scientists and engineers from Nigeria nominated to be fellow of the academy based on having made "a substantial contribution to the improvement of natural knowledge, including Engineering, Science, Mathematics and Medical Science". The process of becoming a fellow of the academy is procedural. It begins by a nomination of qualified candidate by a fellow of the academy, often refers to as the principal nominator who must be in the same academic field as the candidate. He would submit a nomination form on behalf of the preferred candidate and the nomination period last for one month, from June to July. Thereafter, the candidate will be invited for screening by appropriate Sectional Committees before a recommendation to the council chaired by the president for short-listing. Short-listed candidates are then presented to the general assembly for election. To be successful, candidates must score at least half of the total votes cast. Fellows are elected for life, and gain the right to use the postnominal Fellow of the Nigerian Academy of Science (FAS) title. The rights and responsibilities of Fellows also include a duty to financially contribute to the academy, the right to stand for council posts, and the right to elect new Fellows. Not more the ten (10) Fellows are elected annually.

== Council ==
The Council is a body of 17 Fellows, including the officers (the president, the treasurer, three Secretaries—one from the physical sciences, one from biological sciences— the Foreign Secretary and the public affairs secretary). The council is tasked with coordinating the academy's overall policy, managing all business related to the academy, amending, making or repealing the academy's Standing Orders. Members are elected annually via a postal ballot. The president, vice president, 3 secretaries, and the treasurer are collectively the officers of the academy. The officers in 2026 are:

- President: Professor Abubakar Sambo, FAS
- Vice President: Professor Friday Okonofua, FAS
- Treasurer: Professor Olatunde Farombi, FAS
- Biological Secretary: Professor Morenike Ukpong, FAS
- Physical Secretary: Professor Abel Olayinka, FAS
- Foreign Secretary: Professor Babatunde Rabiu, FAS
- Public Affairs Secretary: Professor Chinedum Babalola, FAS

== President ==
- Prof. Abubakar Sambo became president in January 2025 . He is past vice-chancellor of two universities and past Director-General of the Energy Commission of Nigeria.

== Past presidents ==
- Professor Victor Adenuga Oyenuga, FAS (1977- 1978)
- Professor Professor Cyril Agodi Onwumechili, FAS (1979 - 1980)
- Professor Umaru Shehu, FAS(1981- 1982)
- Professor Emmanuel Emovon, FAS (1983 - 1984)
- Professor Augustine Njoku Obi, FAS (1985- 1986)
- Professor Ifedayo Oladapo, FAS (1987 - 1988)
- Professor Caleb Olaniyan, FAS (1989 - 1990)
- Professor Akpanoluo Ikpong Ikpong Ette, FAS (1991 - 1992)
- Professor Anthony Afolabi Adegbola, FAS (1993 - 1994)
- Professor Awele Maduemezia, FAS (1995 - 1996)
- Professor Lateef Akinola Salako, FAS (1997 - 1998)
- Professor Anya Oko Anya, FAS (1999 - 2000)
- Professor Alexander Animalu, FAS (2001- 2002)
- Professor Gabriel Babatunde Ogunmola, FAS (2003 - 2006)
- Professor David Okali, FAS (2006 - 2008)
- Professor Oyewusi Ibidapo Obe, FAS (2008- 2013)
- Professor Oyewale Tomori, FAS (2013- 2017)
- Professor Kalu Mosto Onuoha, FAS (2017-2021)
- Professor Ekanem Braide, FAS (2021 - 2025)

== Media awards ==
The Nigerian Academy of Science's Media Awards are presented annually to recognize outstanding science reporting. The award was founded in 2010 by the Nigerian Academy of Science to honor broadcast journalists and newspaper columnists who published science-related articles. The award presentation is attended by media representatives, politicians, celebrities, and journalists.

== See also ==
- List of fellows of the Nigerian Academy of Science
