= Caleb Olaniyan =

Nigerian zoologist

Caleb Olaniyan is a Nigerian Professor of Zoology, and former President of the Nigerian Academy of Science.

In 1989, he was elected President of the Nigerian Academy of Science to succeeded Professor Ifedayo Oladapo.
