= Alexander Animalu =

Nigerian physicist (born 1938)

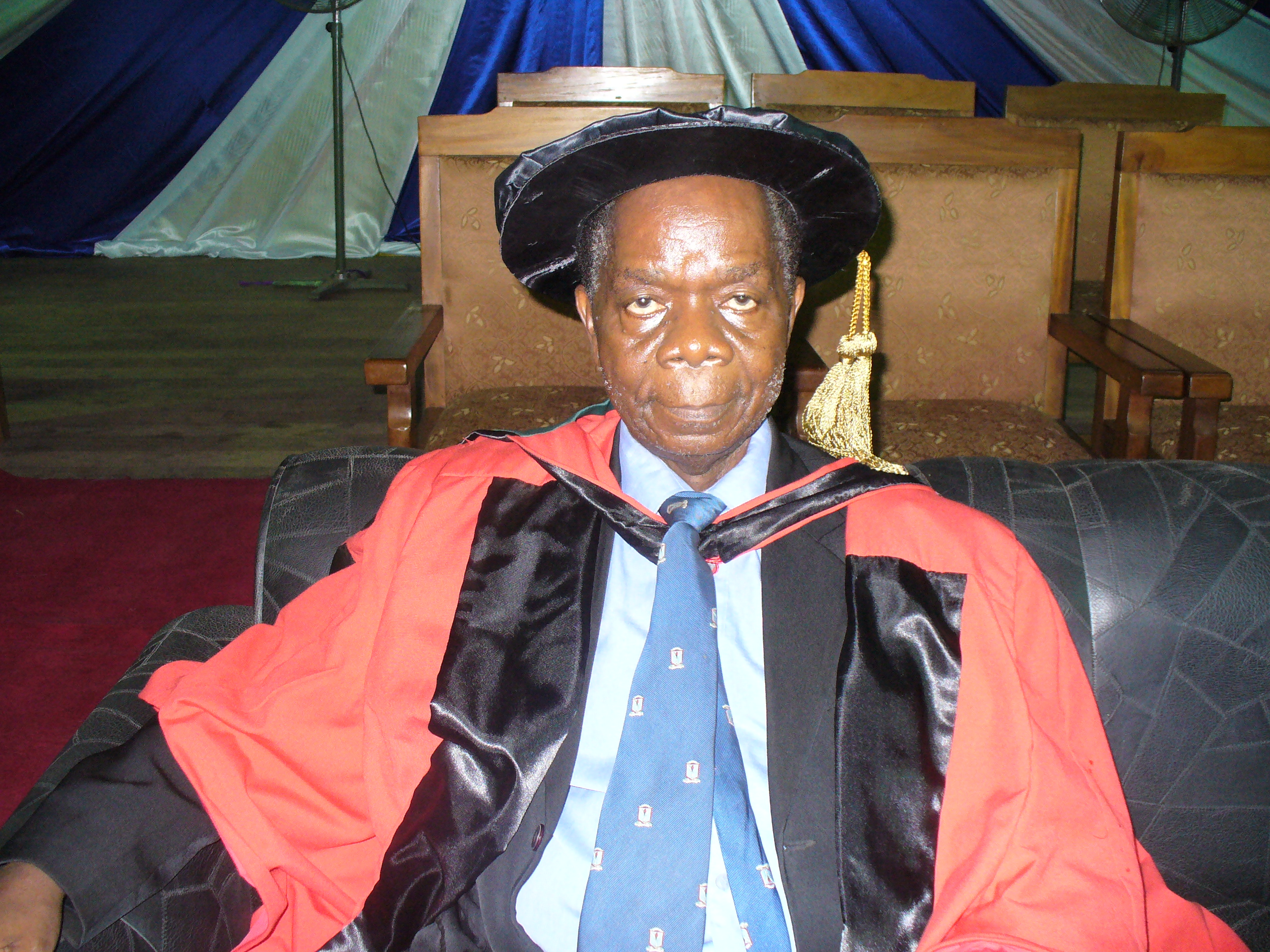
- Born: 28 August 1938 (age 88); Oba, Nigeria
- Citizenship: Nigeria
- Education: University of Ibadan; University of Cambridge
- Known for: Pseudopotentials, superconductivity, isosuperconductivity
- Awards: Shell-BP Scholarship, University of Ibadan (1959–62); Crowe's Prize on Abstract Algebra & Theory of Numbers (1962); Department Prizes in Mathematics (1961 & 1962); University of Ibadan Postgraduate Scholarship at University of Cambridge (1963–65)
- Scientific career
- Fields: Theoretical Physics
- Workplaces: University of Nigeria, Nsukka; University of Cambridge; Massachusetts Institute of Technology; Stanford University; University of North Carolina, Chapel Hill; Drexel University; University of Missouri, Rolla
- Doctoral advisor: Volker Heine

Alexander Obiefoka Enukora Animalu (born 28 August 1938) is a Nigerian academic, a Professor Emeritus of Physics at the University of Nigeria, Nsukka.

He holds a BSc (London), M.A. (Cantab.) and PhD (Ibadan), FAS, NNOM, IOM

A pioneer of solar energy in Nigeria, Animalu is a physicist of international repute, member of the highest advisory body on Science and Technology to the Nigerian government, Honorary Presidential Advisory Council on Science and Technology (2001–03) and former Director National Mathematical Centre, Abuja.

== Biography ==
He was born on 28 August 1938, the fifth child to Michael Animalu Nwakudu and Josephine Nkenwa in Okuzu, Oba of Idemili South L.G.A. of Anambra State of Nigeria, and attended St. Paul's CMS Church School, Isu-Oba (1943–44); St. Thomas's CMS Church School, Okuzu (1944–45), CMS Central School, Isu-Oba (1945–51), Dennis Memorial Grammar School (1952–56) for secondary education and (1957–58) for Higher School Certificate. He then attended University College, Ibadan (1959–62), where he was taught by Professor Chike Obi and Professor James Ezeilo.

== Early career in United Kingdom and America ==
With scholarship awarded from the University College, Ibadan, Alex Animalu arrived from Nigeria to University of Cambridge, United Kingdom in October 1962 with a B.Sc. degree in mathematics. He earned the Cambridge M.A. Mathematics and proceeded to do doctorate research under the supervision of Prof. Heine at Cavendish laboratory, University of Cambridge, United Kingdom. After obtaining his PhD in Solid State Physics in 1965, he was invited by the American expert in solid state physics, Prof. Walter Harrison to work as a Research Associate in the Division of Applied Physics of W.W. Hansen Laboratories of Physics, Standard University, California. After the termination of the tenure of appointment at Stanford University as Research Associate, Alex got, by invitation, consecutive appointments in three other universities. The first was the University of North Carolina at Chapel Hill (January – September 1968). Alex took up the next appointment in the University of Missouri at Rolla, School of mines and metallurgy. He was made an Assistant Professor for two years (October 1968 – 1970) at Rolla. He was also appointed a member of the Research team working on the Moon landing mission supported by the U.S. Air Force. In 1970, he got an appointment at Drexel University in Philadelphia where he became an associate professor of physics. Among other activities, Prof. Animalu was consulting for the US Army Materials Research Laboratory at Watertown, Massachusetts while continuing his research activities in diverse fields. On invitation from Herbert Zeiger in 1972, he joined the prestigious Lincoln Laboratory, Massachusetts Institute of Technology (M.I.T.), at Lexington, MA, as a research physicist.

== Later career in Nigeria ==
He was invited to become a professor of physics in 1976 in the Department of Physics and Astronomy, University of Nigeria, Nsukka by his former lecturer and the then Vice-Chancellor of the university, Professor Emeritus James Ezeilo. The former Nigerian President, Chief Olusegun Obasanjo, presented him with the Nigerian National Order of Merit (NNOM) award for Basic Science in 2000. He rose in academic positions becoming Head of Department of Physics, UNN in 1981 and 1994 and Dean, Faculty of the Physical Sciences, UNN. His proposal to the Federal Government of Nigeria led to the establishment of a Centre for Energy Research and Development in the UNN in 1980. He became the first substantive Chairman of its Governing Board in 1989. The idea for a National Mathematical Center in Nigeria was hatched by Professor Emeritus Ezeilo and Animalu. He was the 1990 Ahiajoku lecturer, the highest Igbo academic privilege given to such scholars as Professor Chinua Achebe and Professor Onwumechili.

With Willy Umezinwa he co-authored the 1968 book Asp, From African Symbols to Physics'. Animalu has more than 100 scholarly articles to his credit.

He was honoured with the position of Emeritus Professor of the University of Nigeria in 2006. He is also chairman/CEO, Institute for Basic Research (Nigeria Division) and a Knight of St. Christopher (KSC).

== Research profile ==
=== Google Scholar citations ===
- "Animalu's Google Scholar Citations"

=== ResearchGate profile ===
- "Animalu's ResearchGate Profile"
