= Victor Adenuga Oyenuga =

Nigerian Professor Emeritus of Agricultural science

- Born: 9 April 1917; Ijebu Ode, Ogun State, Nigeria
- Died: 10 April 2010 (aged 93)
- Citizenship: Nigerian
- Occupations: educator; agricultural scientist; researcher
- Awards: CFR

Victor Adenuga Oyenuga, CFR (April 9, 1917 – April 10, 2010) was a Nigerian Professor Emeritus of Agricultural science and pioneer President of the Nigerian Academy of Science. He was the first Emeritus Professor of the University of Ibadan and the first Nigerian professor of Agriculture.

== Early life ==
Professor Oyenuga was born on April 9, 1917, at Isonyi, a town in the city of Ijebu Ode, Ogun State, southwestern Nigeria by late Prince Thomas Oyenuga. He attended Emmanuel Primary School in Ado Ekiti, Emmanuel Primary School before he was admitted into Wasinmi African Church Secondary School, Ijebu Ode.

He proceeded to Durham University, Newcastle upon Tyne where he received a bachelor's degree in Agricultural chemistry in 1948 and doctorate degree in Agricultural biochemistry and Nutrition from the same university in 1951. In 1977, he bagged an Honorary degree of Doctor of Science from Obafemi Awolowo University, the same year he was elected President of the Nigerian Academy of Science and in 1978, he was honored with a Doctor of Science degree by Durham University for his outstanding publications in reputable journals. In 1996 he was honored with Doctor of Science by Ogun State University in recognition of his immense contributions to Agricultural science.

== Career ==
He began his career in 1935 as a classroom teacher at Teacher Anglican Church Mission, Ijebu. He later joined the University of Ibadan as an academic staff in the department of Animal Nutrition where he rose to the position of a Senior Lecturer in 1958, the same year he was appointed head of department agricultural chemistry, a position he held for three years. In 1961, he became a Professor of Obafemi Awolowo University where he served as head of department of Agriculture. In 1972, he was appointed Deputy Vice Chancellor of the University of Ibadan, a. Position he held 1976 and in 1979, he became the first Emeritus Professor of the University of Ibadan. In 1992, he was appointed a Pro-Chancellor and Chairman Governing Council, University of Port Harcourt.

=== Popular Book by Victor Adenuga Oyenuga ===
*Agriculture in Nigeria: An introduction

=== Marriage and family ===
On April 11, 1950, Victor Adenuga Oyenuga married Sabinah Babafunmike Oyenuga (Nee Onabajo). They had five (5) children, three sons and two daughters.

== Fellowships ==
- Fellow, Nigerian Academy of Science
- Fellow, Royal Society of Chemistry
- Fellow, Royal Institute of Chemistry
