= List of Nigerian scientists and scholars =

This is a list of Nigerian scientists and scholars. Nigeria is a federal constitutional republic comprising 36 states and its Federal Capital Territory, Abuja. The country is located in West Africa.

== A ==
- Akin Abayomi – pathologist
- Sulyman Age Abdulkareem – chemical engineer
- Bala Achi – historian
- Iya Abubakar – mathematician
- Babatunde Kwaku Adadevoh – chemical pathologist
- Ameyo Adadevoh - Physician
- Ladipo Adamolekun – public administrator
- Anthony Afolabi Adegbola – animal scientist
- Anthony Adegbulugbe – electrical engineer and energy management
- Maggie Aderin–Pocock – space scientist
- Ilesanmi Adesida – physicist
- Olutayo Charles Adesina – historian
- Isaac Adewole – gynaecologist
- Olanike Adeyemo – veterinary medicine and preventive medicine
- Chimamanda Ngozi Adichie – writer
- Adiele Afigbo – historian
- Joseph Ahaneku – chemical pathologist
- Folahanmi Aina –political scientist
- Lenrie Olatokunbo Aina – library and information scientist
- Deborah Ajakaiye – geophysicist
- J. F. Ade Ajayi – historian
- Seth Sunday Ajayi – wildlife ecologist
- Oladele Ajose – public health
- Esther Titilayo Akinlabi – mechanical engineer
- Dora Akunyili – pharmacist
- Grace Alele–Williams – mathematician
- Ambrose Folorunsho Alli – pathologist
- Olajide Aluko – international relations
- Uche Veronica Amazigo – biologist and parasitologist
- El Anatsui – sculpture
- Alexander Animalu – physicist
- Anya Oko Anya – parasitologist
- Ishaya Audu – pediatrician
- Sarki Auwalu – chemical engineer
- Eme Awa – political scientist
- Ayodele Awojobi – mechanical engineer

== B ==
- Olumbe Bassir – biochemistry and microbiology
- Ekanem Ikpi Braide – parasitologist

== D ==
- John Dabiri – aeronautical engineering and biophysics
- Bello Bako Dambatta – chemist
- Kenneth Dike – historian
- Ikechukwu Dozie – public health scientist

== E ==
- ThankGod Echezona Ebenezer - bioinformatician
- Michael Echeruo – literature
- Philip Emeagwali – mathematician and engineer
- Emmanuel Emovon – chemist
- Charles Esimone – pharmacist
- Emmanuel Chukwudi Eze – philosopher
- Chinwe Nwogo Ezeani – librarian

== F ==
- Babs Fafunwa – educationist
- Toyin Falola – historian
- Adeyinka Gladys Falusi – haematologist
- Oluwole Babafemi Familoni – chemist
- Abdullahi dan Fodio – Islamic theologian and jurist

== G ==
- Ibrahim Gambari – political scientist
- Adenike Grange – medicine
- Oye Gureje – psychiatry

== I ==
- Oni Idigbe – medical researcher
- Albert Ilemobade – veterinarian
- Maurice Iwu – pharmacist
- Sunday Iyahen – mathematician

== K ==
- Kalu Ndukwe Kalu – political scientist
- Muhammad ibn Muhammad al-Kishnawi – mathematician

== L ==
- Abisogun Leigh – animal scientist

== M ==
- Akin Mabogunje – geographer
- Emmanuel Ndubisi Maduagwu – biochemist
- Awele Maduemezia – physicist
- Oliver Mobisson – computer scientist
- Fatima Batul Mukhtar – botanist

== N ==
- Chinedu Ositadinma Nebo – engineer
- Eni Njoku – botanist
- Bartholomew Nnaji – mechanical and industrial engineering
- Andrew Jonathan Nok – biochemist
- Hadiza Nuhu – pharmacist
- Eucharia Oluchi Nwaichi – environmental biochemist
- Humphrey Nwosu – political scientist

== O ==
- John Obafunwa – pathologist
- Oyewusi Ibidapo-Obe – systems engineer
- Chike Obi – mathematician
- Abiola Odejide – linguist
- Latunde Odeku – neurosurgeon
- Josephat Obi Oguejiofor – philosopher
- Gabriel Babatunde Ogunmola – chemist
- Babatunde Ogunnaike – chemical engineer
- Adetoun Ogunsheye – library scientist
- Ayo Ogunsheye – adult education
- Peter Okebukola – researcher and administrator
- Francisca Nneka Okeke – physicist
- Friday Okonofua – gynaecologist
- Samuel Okoye – astrophysicist
- Isidore Okpewho – novelist and critic
- Ben Okri – writer
- Ifedayo Oladapo – civil engineer
- Ibiyemi Olatunji–Bello – physiologist
- Abel Idowu Olayinka – geophysicist
- Olufunmilayo Olopade – oncologist
- Is-haq Oloyede – Islamic studies
- Adegoke Olubummo - mathematician
- Kunle Olukotun – electrical engineering and computer scientist
- Hezekiah Oluwasanmi – agricultural economist
- Sophie Oluwole – philosopher
- Bennet Omalu – forensic pathologist
- Akinyinka Omigbodun – gynaecologist
- Michael Omolewa – educationist
- Peter Onumanyi – mathematician
- Kalu Mosto Onuoha – geophysicist
- Obinna Onwujekwe – health economist
- Viola Onwuliri – biochemist
- Cyril Agodi Onwumechili – nuclear physicist
- Yemi Osinbajo – lawyer
- Femi Osofisan – writer
- Rose Osuji – physicist
- Niyi Osundare – literature
- Benjamin Oluwakayode Osuntokun – neurologist
- Bruce Ovbiagele - neurologist, researcher, administrator, and editor
- Victor Adenuga Oyenuga – agriculturist
- Nelson M. Oyesiku – neurosurgeon and endocrinologist

== P ==
- Chinedum Babalola – pharmacist

== R ==
- Olikoye Ransome-Kuti – paediatrician
- Ola Rotimi – playwright

== S ==
- Omowunmi Sadik – chemist
- Lateef Akinola Salako – pharmacologist
- Arinola Olasumbo Sanya – physiotherapy
- Umaru Shehu – physician
- Winston Wole Soboyejo – mechanical and aerospace engineering
- John Olubi Sodipo – philosopher
- Olusoga Sofola – physiologist
- Zulu Sofola – playwright and dramatist
- Olaitan Soyannwo – anesthetist
- Margaret Adebisi Sowunmi – botanist and environmental archaeologist

== T ==
- Tekena Tamuno – historian
- Grace Oladunni Taylor – biochemist
- Adeyinka Tella – librarian and professor
- Oyewale Tomori – virologist
- Mahmud Modibbo Tukur – historian

== U ==
- Fabian Udekwu – cardiac surgeon
- Chinyere Ukaga – environmental biologist and parasitologist
- Ibrahim Umar (physicist) – physicist
- Jarlath Udoudo Umoh – veterinary doctor
- Yusuf Bala Usman – historian
- Patrick Utomi – political economist

== W ==
- Eka Esu Williams – immunologist
