= List of Nigerian medical doctors =

This list of Nigerian medical doctors includes notable physicians and surgeons, medical scientists and medical doctors from Nigeria or of Nigerian descent. Physicians of all specialities may be listed here.

== Alphabetical list ==
=== A ===
- Akin Abayomi, medical academic and civil servant
- Abimbola Abolarinwa (born c.1979), first female urologist in Nigeria
- Ameyo Adadevoh (1956-2014), physician
- Babatunde Kwaku Adadevoh (1933-1997), physician and academic administrator
- Adesola Adedayo, doctor and politician
- Isaac Folorunso Adewole (born 1954), academic gynecologist and obstetrician
- Oluwaserimi Adewumi Ajetunmobi, doctor and politician
- Tunji Alausa (born 1965), nephrologist and politician
- Ambrose Folorunsho Alli (1929-1989), medical academic and state governor
- Nelson Aluya, Nigerian-American pediatrician and internal medicine physician
- Ishaya Audu (1927-2005), physician, academic and politician

=== B ===
- Seiyefa Fun-Akpa Brisibe, physician and academic

=== D ===
- Samuel Dagogo-Jack, Nigerian-American physician

=== F ===
- Adeyinka Gladys Falusi, haematologist
- Dolapo Fasawe, public health physician and environmentalist

=== G ===
- Adenike Grange, academic pediatrician and politician
- Oye Gureje (born 1952), academic psychiatrist

=== I ===
- Omokhudu Idogho, public health physician

=== J ===
- Ekem John, medical doctor, politician and public administrator in Akwa Ibom State

=== M ===
- Mamman Mohammed (died 2025), doctor and civil servant from Yobe State

=== N ===
- Nnamdi Nwauwa (1954-2018), emergency medicine physician

=== O ===
- John Obafunwa
- Friday Okonofua
- Friday Okonofua
- Akinyinka Omigbodun
- Abraham Osinubi (born 1963), anatomist and academic
- Benjamin Oluwakayode Osuntokun
- Nelson Oyesiku

=== R ===
- Olikoye Ransome-Kuti

=== S ===
- Umaru Shehu (1930-2023), physician and academic administrator
- Olaitan Soyannwo

=== U ===
- Fabian Udekwu, cardiac surgeon and academic
- Doris Uzoka-Anite, politician, doctor and financial analyst

=== W ===
- Eka Esu Williams (born 1950), immunologist and reproductive health activist

== See also ==
- List of physicians
- List of Nigerian scientists and scholars
