= Ayo =

Ayo, Ayọ, Ayọ̀ and AYO may also refer to:

== People ==
Ayo
- Gender: Male/Female
- Language: Yoruba

Origin
- Origin: Nigeria
- Meaning: Joy
- Region of origin: South western Nigeria

Other names
- Related names: Ayomide, Ayomikun, Ayonitemi, Ayokunumi

Ayọ /ˈɑːjoʊ/ is a common Yoruba given name. Ayọ in Yoruba means Joy. Ayo is a gender neutral name which means it can be given to either male or female. The name Ayo is a diminutive form or a shortened form of names like Ayomide which means ‘my joy has come’, Ayomikun which denotes ‘my joy is full’, Ayokunumi which means ‘I have joy in me’, Ayonitemi which denotes ‘joy is mine’, FunmilAyo which means give me joy etc.

- Ayo Akinola, American-Canadian soccer player
- Ayo Aderinwale, Nigerian diplomat
- Ayo & Teo, American dancers
- Ayo Bankole, Nigerian composer
- Ayo Dosunmu (born 1999), American basketball player
- Ayo Edebiri, American comedian and actress
- Ayo Fayose, Nigerian politician
- Ayo Ogunsheye, Nigerian academic
- Ayo Oni, Nigerian politician
- Ayo Rosiji, Nigerian politician
- Ayo Shonaiya, Nigerian film producer
- Ayo Adesanya, Nigerian actress
- Ayo (singer) (born 1980), German actress and singer
- Ay-O (born 1931), Japanese painter from Fluxus
- Genoveva Añonma, also known as Ayo, (born 1989), Equatoguinean footballer
- Ayo Makun, Nigerian comedian

=== Surname ===
- Felix Ayo (1933–2023), Biscay-born Italian violinist

== Places ==
- Ayyo (also spelled 'Ayo'), a village in central Syria
- Ayo Rock Formations, a geological feature of the island of Aruba
- Juan de Ayolas Airport (IATA Code: AYO), in Ayolas, Paraguay

== Music ==
=== Orchestras ===
- Adelaide Youth Orchestra, an Adelaide-based musical youth organisation, known as AYO
- Australian Youth Orchestra, an Australian national musical youth organisation, known as AYO

=== Albums ===
- Ayo (Wizkid album), 2014 album by Nigerian artist Wizkid
- Ayo (Bomba Estéreo album), 2017 album by Colombian band Bomba Estéreo
- Ayo (Ayo album), 2017 album by German singer Ayọ

=== Songs ===
- "Ayo" (Chris Brown and Tyga song)
- "Ayo!", 2006 song by Mýa
- "A-Yo" (Lady Gaga song)
- "A-Yo" (Method Man & Redman song)
- "A-Yo", by Jinusean from the 2001 album The Reign
- "Ayo", by Andre Nickatina from the 2002 album Hell's Kitchen
- "A-Yo", by SHINee from the 2010 album Lucifer
- "Ayo", by Andy Mineo from the 2013 album Heroes for Sale
- "Ayo", by Simi from the 2019 album Omo Charlie Champagne, Vol. 1
- "Ayo", by Baltimore rapper Bossman from the soundtrack album And All the Pieces Matter for HBO series The Wire
- "Ay-Oh", by Queen from Live Aid and the soundtrack to the 2018 film Bohemian Rhapsody

== Others ==
- AYO Foods, an American company making West African foods
- Ayoreo language (ISO 639-3 ayo), a language spoken in Paraguay and Bolivia
- ayo, shortened name for at least two African mancala games:
  - ayoayo
  - oware
- Tetrastigma harmandii, common name of a Filipino plant in the genus Tetrastigma, known for its edible fruit
- Ayo, the mascot character of the 2026 Summer Youth Olympics
- Ayo, a common variation of the word Yo (greeting)
