= List of Nigerian women academics =

This is a list of Nigerian women academics. An academic is a person who works as a teacher or researcher at a university or other higher education institution.

== Nigerian women academics ==
- Funke Abimbola
- Ayoka Olufunmilayo Adebambo
- Catherine Obianuju Acholonu
- Oluranti Adebule
- Maggie Aderin-Pocock
- Olanike Adeyemo
- Chimamanda Ngozi Adichie
- Tomilayo Adekanye
- Deborah Ajakaiye
- Beatrice Aboyade
- Jadesola Akande
- Dora Akunyili
- Sarah Alade
- Tejumade Alakija
- Grace Alele-Williams
- Zaynab Alkali
- Sefi Atta
- Bolanle Awe
- Ayo Ayoola-Amale
- Adejoke Ayoola
- Uche Azikiwe
- Olubola Babalola
- Doris Bozimo
- Grace Ebun Delano
- Comfort Ekpo
- Buchi Emecheta
- Chinwe Nwogo Ezeani
- Adeyinka Gladys Falusi
- Adenike Grange
- Francisca Oboh Ikuenobe
- Jackie Kay
- Sarah Ladipo Manyika
- Amina J. Mohammed
- Eucharia Oluchi Nwaichi
- Flora Nwapa
- Chinwe Obaji
- Aize Obayan
- Jumoke Oduwole
- Molara Ogundipe
- Adetowun Ogunsheye
- Kathleen Adebola Okikiolu
- Victoria Okojie
- Nnenna Okore
- Chinyere Stella Okunna
- Smaranda Olarinde
- Ibiyemi Olatunji-Bello
- Olufunmilayo Olopade
- Ifeoma Mabel Onyemelukwe
- Adenike Osofisan
- Rose Osuji
- Felicity Okpete Ovai
- Oyèrónkẹ́ Oyěwùmí
- Babalola Chinedum Peace
- Omowunmi Sadik
- Arinola Olasumbo Sanya
- Zulu Sofola
- Margaret Adebisi Sowunmi
- Olaitan Soyannwo
- Grace Oladunni Taylor
