= Idogho =

Idogho is a surname found among the Urhobo and Edo of Nigeria, as well as neighboring ethnic groups in Delta State and Edo State. Notable people with the surname include:

- Philipa Idogho, former rector of Auchi Polytechnic
- Omokhudu Idogho, managing director of Society for Family Health Nigeria
