= Yusuf Haroun =

Nigerian doctor and psychologist

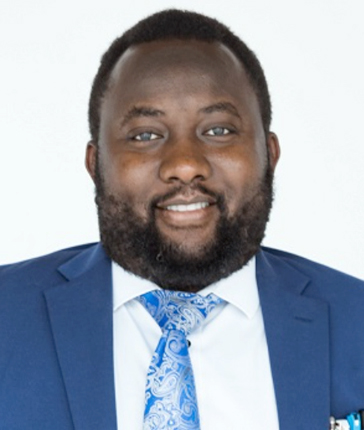
- Education: Franklin University (Healthcare Administration), Lagos State University College of Medicine (LASUCOM) - MBBS (Bachelor of Medicine and Surgery)
- Occupations: Medical doctor, psychologist, public health specialist

Haroun Yusuf is a Nigerian medical doctor and psychologist. He is the founder of the Love for Health Organisation (LHO), a non-governmental organisation that promotes healthcare awareness.

== Early life and education ==
Haroun was born into a middle-class family in Nigeria. He was educated at Gbagada Grammar School, Gbagada, Lagos, where he obtained his Senior Secondary School Leaving Certificate before obtaining a MBBS (Bachelor of Medicine and Surgery) degree from Lagos State University College of Medicine (LASUCOM) in 2007. He continued his education at Franklin University in Columbus, Ohio, USA, where he received a Master of Healthcare Administration (MHA) degree with first-class honors, and he also completed a Master's of Business Administration at Harvard Business School.

He participated in the mandatory one-year National Youth Service Corps (NYSC) at Lagos State University Teaching Hospital (LASUTH), Ikeja, Nigeria, in 2012, and afterwards served as an intern at St. Catherine Medical Centre, Mafoluku, Oshodi. In 2008, he published the Love for Health Journal (Concept of Health, Medicine, and Treatment in Patients) and later founded the Love for Health Organisation (LHO) in the same year. The organisation has implemented more than 1,000 health outreaches in Nigeria since its inception.

Between 2013 and 2015, Haroun practised privately at Finnih Medical Centre], GRA, Ikeja, Lagos before relocating to Saudi Arabia where he worked as an Amerisource Supervisor for a 3PL Pharmaceutical Logistic Centre. He also worked as a licensed medical professional in Saudi Arabia between 2015 and 2017.
