= Abolarinwa =

Nigerian given name

- Gender: Unisex
- Language: Yoruba

Origin
- Origin: Nigerian
- Meaning: "One who walks with wealth"
- Region of origin: South-west Nigeria

Other names
- Variant forms: Abọ́lárìn, Bọ́lárìnwá, Bọ́lá, Bọ́lárìn

Abolarinwa (abáọlárìnwá) is a Nigerian surname of Yoruba origin meaning "One who walks with wealth" The name is derived from “a” (one who), “bá” (together with), “ọlá” (wealth or nobility), “rìn” (walk), and "wá" (come, arrive) It is morphologically structured as "Abọ́lárìnwá." Variants include Abọ́lárìn, Bọ́lárìnwá, Bọ́lá, Bọ́lárìn.

Notable people with the surname include:

- Abimbola Abolarinwa (born 1979), Nigerian physician
- Tom Bolarinwa (born 1990), English footballer
- David Bolarinwa (born 1993), English sprinter
- Rasheed Abolarin (born 2002), Nigerian cricketer
