= Arinola (given name) =

Nigerian given name

- Gender: Unisex
- Language: Yoruba

Origin
- Language: Nigeria
- Meaning: (Born) in the midst of wealth
- Region of origin: South-west

Other names
- Alternative spelling: àárín-ọlá; Aarinola
- Short form: àárín
- See also: Aarinolaoluwa

Arinola audio is a Nigerian given unisex name of Yoruba origin which means "(Born) in the midst of wealth". The most commonly used diminutive form of Arinola is "Arin" which simply means Middle. Arinola is morphologically spelt "Àarínọlá" in the Yoruba language, predominant in the South-western region of Nigeria.

Notable people with the name include:

- Arinola Olasumbo Sanya (born 1953), Nigerian professor of physiotherapy and a former commissioner of health
- Sofiat Arinola Obanishola (born 2003), Nigerian badminton player
