= Francis Adedayo Faduyile =

Nigerian physician, academic and politician

Senator representing Ondo South Senatorial District
- Incumbent
- Assumed office 24 June 2026
- Preceded by: Jimoh Ibrahim
- Constituency: Ondo South Senatorial District

Special Adviser on Health Matters to the Governor of Ondo State
- Governor: Rotimi Akeredolu

National President of the Nigerian Medical Association
- In office 2018–2020

Personal details
- Born: Francis Adedayo Faduyile Okitipupa, Ondo State, Nigeria
- Party: All Progressives Congress
- Education: University of Lagos; Federal University of Technology Akure
- Occupation: Physician; academic; forensic pathologist; politician
- Profession: Pathologist
- Known for: Forensic pathology, medical leadership and Nigerian politics
- Awards: Officer of the Order of the Niger (OON)

Adedayo Francis Faduyile (also known as Dayo Faduyile) is a Nigerian physician, academic, forensic pathologist, and politician serving as the senator representing Ondo South Senatorial District in the Federal Republic of Nigeria. He has also served as the national president of the Nigerian Medical Association, and has served as special adviser on health to the then governor of Ondo State Rotimi Akeredolu.

== Early life and education ==
Faduyile is from Ikoya in Okitipupa local government, Ondo State, Nigeria. He attended the University of Lagos, where he obtained a Bachelor of Medicine, Bachelor of Surgery (MBBS) degree in 1996.

He subsequently obtained a Master of Business Administration (MBA) from the Federal University of Technology Akure in 2005, and a Master of Science (M.Sc.) in Cell Biology and Genetics from the University of Lagos in 2008.

His postgraduate professional qualifications include:

- Fellow, Medical College of Pathologists, National Postgraduate Medical College of Nigeria (2007)
- Diploma in Cancer Prevention, National Cancer Institute, United States (2008)
- Diploma in Forensic Human Identification, Faculty of Forensic and Legal Medicine, Royal College of Physicians, United Kingdom (2015)
- Fellow, College of Pathologists of East, Central and Southern Africa (2016)

== Academic career ==
Faduyile is a professor of Pathology and Forensic Medicine. He has served on the academic staff of the Lagos State University College of Medicine and as an honorary consultant pathologist at the Lagos State University Teaching Hospital.

His research has included studies in forensic pathology, autopsy-based mortality, cytopathology and other areas of pathology.

== Professional career ==
Faduyile held several leadership positions within the Nigerian Medical Association before serving as its national president from 2018 to 2020 During his tenure, he advocated healthcare reforms, improved welfare for medical professionals, and policies aimed at strengthening Nigeria's healthcare system.

He later served as special adviser on health to Ondo State Governor Rotimi Akeredolu, where he advised on healthcare policy and health sector development.

He has also served as pro-chancellor and chairman of the Governing Council of the Federal University of Education, Kontagora, Niger State.

== Political career ==
Faduyile has been associated with the All Progressives Congress (APC) and has contested elective offices at different levels. In May 2026, he emerged as the APC candidate for the Ondo South Senatorial District by-election following the party's primary election.

On 21 June 2026, he was declared winner of the Ondo South Senatorial District by-election conducted by the Independent National Electoral Commission (INEC). He was sworn into the Nigerian Senate on 24 June 2026, succeeding Jimoh Ibrahim following Ibrahim's appointment as Nigeria's permanent representative to the United Nations.

== Research ==
Faduyile's research focused on anatomical pathology, cytopathology, forensic pathology, molecular pathology, cancer prevention, and medical education. His research publications has included autopsy-based studies of maternal mortality, non-traumatic deaths, hypertension and sudden unexpected deaths, hanging deaths, and mortality associated with motorcycle accidents.

== Professional affiliations ==
- Nigerian Medical Association
- National Postgraduate Medical College of Nigeria
- College of Pathologists of East, Central and Southern Africa
- Faculty of Forensic and Legal Medicine, Royal College of Physicians
- African Organisation for Research and Training in Cancer

== Honours and recognition ==
Faduyile is a recipient of the Nigerian national honour of Officer of the Order of the Niger (OON).
