= Love for Health Organisation =

Nigerian non-governmental organization

- Founder: Yusuf Haroun
- Type: Non-governmental organization

Love for Health Organisation (LHO) is a Nigerian non-governmental organization that advocates for health and provides free health care for women. It was founded by Yusuf Haroun.

== History ==
Love for Health organisations was established in 2008, as an umbrella health organisation. The organisation has supported 50,000 individuals with HIV, in 70 clinics across nine states being enrolled in life-saving antiretroviral therapy.

In 2020, LHO partnered with Imo state government to enable high rate of safe deliveries. It has trained 488 frontline health workers in Imo, Niger, and Lagos States.

LHO advocates for reproductive health, sexual health, and women's rights. The organisation has helped to Provide free healthcare in combating violence against women and has carried out 1,200 outreaches in Nigeria.

In 2023, It was awarded the JOMCA Awards for its humanitarian contributions to improving the health conditions of women.

In 2024, Love For Health Organization partnered with Bioclinix Medical Diagnostics Centre to launched a medical outreach program aimed at providing free health services to underserved communities.
