= Philipa Idogho =

Nigerian academic administrator

Philipa Omamhe Idogho

Rector of Auchi Polytechnic
- In office 2008–2015
- Succeeded by: Dr Momodu Sanusi Jimah

Personal details
- Education: Auchi Polytechnic; Ambrose Alli University; University of Benin

Philipa Idogho is a Nigerian academic administrator, who was rector of Auchi Polytechnic, Auchi Edo State. between 2008 and 2016. She was the first female rector of the institution and has been noted to have played a significant role in improving academic capacities and institutionalizing responsibility within the school during her reign.

== Early life and education ==
Idogho is an alumnus of Auchi Polytechnic, Auchi, Edo State. She has a master's degree in Educational management from University of Benin, and a doctorate in educational administration from Ambrose Alli University.

== Career ==
From 2008 to 2016, Idogho was rector of Auchi Polytechnic, Auchi Edo State. Her system of governance in ensuring a serene school environment have caused her to be criticized among some stakeholders in the school. She was replaced by Dr Momodu Sanusi Jimah in acting capacity, before he was substantively appointed in 2018 by President Muhammadu Buhari.

== See also ==
- Idogho
