= Joseph Ahaneku =

Former Vice Chancellor and Consultant Chemical Pathologist

Joseph Eberendu Ahaneku Prof.
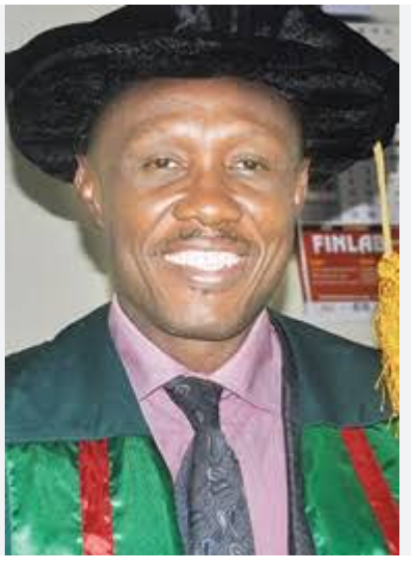

Vice Chancellor of Nnamdi Azikiwe University
- In office 2014–2019
- Succeeded by: Charles Esimone

Personal details
- Born: 1 October 1962 (age 63)
- Education: University of Ibadan
- Awards: In 1992 the Science and Technology Agency of Japan awarded him a Fellowship and grant.

Joseph Eberendu Ahaneku (born October 1, 1962) is an academic and Consultant Chemical Pathologist of Nnamdi Azikiwe University, Awka, Nigeria. Ahaneku is a former Vice Chancellor of Nnamdi Azikiwe University, Awka (Monday 26 May 2014 - Wednesday May 2019). He is from Nnarambia Ahiara Ahiazu Mbaise, Imo State, Nigeria.

== Education ==
Joseph started his Education at St. Joseph's Primary School Eke-Nguru, where he received his primary school leaving certificate. He proceeded to Mbaise Secondary School, Aboh-Mbaise, where he received his secondary school leaving certificate. He attended University of Ibadan where he got his first Degree (BSc) and later his PGD in University College Hospital. There he also earned his MSc. Ahaneku obtained a Bachelor of Science degree in Biochemistry, a Master of Science degree in Chemical Pathology, and a Ph.D. in Chemical Pathology from the University of Ibadan. and Institute of Biology London, Cboi.

== Career ==
Ahaneku joined Nnamdi Azikiwe University, Awka, as a foundation academic staff member in the Department of Chemical Pathology in 1991. In January 1992, he was appointed Honorary Consultant Chemical Pathologist at Nnamdi Azikiwe University Teaching Hospital, Nnewi..

In January 1992, Ahaneku was appointed Honorary Consultant Chemical Pathologist at Nnamdi Azikiwe University Teaching Hospital, Nnewi. In 1992 he became a senior lecturer. Ahaneku has held leadership positions in the Association of Clinical Chemists of Nigeria, including serving in its national executive structure and later becoming National President.

He worked as a research fellow for the Department of Biochemistry and Cell Biology and foreign research fellow of the Department of Biochemistry Saga Medical School, Saga Japan. He conducted research in Japan during the 1990s, including work at institutions in Tokyo and Saga. From 1995 to 1996 he was senior research scientist and professorial fellow of Second Department of Physiology and as the visiting researcher of South-West Medical Research Foundation, San Antonio, Texas. He was the staff and head of department for the Department of Chemical Pathology and sub-dean of the School of Postgraduate Studies, Nnamdi Azikiwe University, Awka. From 2001 to 2003 he was the chairman of the board of trustees of O.M Okonkwo foundation and Demlaz Group of Companies and an executive member of Mbaise Frontline Circle also the executive director of JG ventures and rental services.

== Publications ==
He has published over 52 scientific papers.

== Personal life ==
Joseph Ahaneku is married to Prof. Dr. (Mrs.) Gladys I. Ahaneku mni and has five children namely; Chibueze Ahaneku, Chinaza Ahaneku, Chimeremeze Ahaneku, Chukwumaijem Ahaneku and Chijindu Ahaneku.
