= Mufutau Egberongbe =

Nigerian politician

Federal Representative
- Succeeded by: Adesola Adedayo
- Constituency: Apapa

Personal details
- Party: All Progressives Congress
- Occupation: Lawmaker

Mufutau Egberongbe is a Nigerian politician. He was a member of the 9th House of Representatives, representing Apapa Constituency in Lagos State under the All Progressives Congress (APC). He was succeeded by Adesola Adedayo.
