= Dolapo Fasawe =

Nigerian Health Physician and Environmentalist

Mandate secretary of Federal Capital Territory Health and Environment Secretariat (FCT-HES)
- Incumbent
- Assumed office 2023
- Appointed by: President Bola Ahmed Tinubu (GCFR)

Personal details
- Education: Obafemi Awolowo University; Liverpool School of Tropical Medicine; Lagos State University School of Medicine

Adedolapo Fasawe is a Nigerian public health physician and environmentalist. She served as the first woman General Manager of the Lagos State Environmental Protection Agency (LASEPA) from August 2019 to 2023. She was nominated for Lagos State Commissioner but turned down the offer to become the Mandate Secretary for Health Services and Environment in the Federal Capital Territory Administration (FCTA).

== Education ==
Fasawe earned an MBBS in Medicine and Surgery from Obafemi Awolowo University, Ile-Ife. She holds a Master's Degree in Public Health from Lagos State University College of Medicine, a diploma in International Health Consultancy from the Liverpool School of Tropical Medicine, and a qualification in Global Mental Health Management from King's College London.

== Career ==
Fasawe has over 20 years of experience as a public health physician, which includes clinical medicine and policymaking. She served 19 years in the Lagos State government before her FCTA appointment. In 2014, she coordinated the State Emergency Public Health Information Strategy for the Ebola Virus Disease outbreak in Lagos. From 2019 - 2023, she served as the general manager for Lagos State Environmental Protection Agency. In 2023, she was nominated for a commissioner appointment but turned it down to become the Mandate Secretary for Health Services and Environment in the Federal Capital Territory Administration (FCTA).

== Awards and honours ==
In June 2025, she received the Amazon Environmental Health award from the Pest Control Association of Nigeria, the Silent Hero in Healthcare Delivery Award from the Nigeria Silent Heroes and the Award of Excellence in Climate Action from Obafemi Awolowo University.
