= Abimbola Abolarinwa =

Nigerian physician (born c. 1979)

- Born: Abimbola Ayodeji Abolarinwa c. 1979; England, United Kingdom
- Occupations: physician; urologist
- Years active: 2006–present
- Children: 2

Abimbola Ayodeji Abolarinwa (born c. 1979), is a Nigerian physician. She was the first female urologist in Nigeria.

== Life ==
Born in England, United Kingdom to a mother who is a lawyer and a father who is a Nigerian Air Force officer and surgeon, Abolarinwa is a native of Illofa, a suburb of Oke Ero local government area of Kwara State. She had her primary school education at Air Force Primary School Kaduna and her secondary school education at Air Force Girls Military School, Jos before she proceeded to study medicine at the University of Ibadan, graduating in 2004. Upon graduation, she did her internship in the Nigerian Air Force Hospital, Ikeja, Lagos State and thereafter completed her compulsory National Youth Service Corps in Nigerian Army Reference Hospital, Kaduna where she worked as a medical officer. In 2009, she got employed by the Lagos State University Teaching Hospital, where she currently works, for her residency training in surgery. In October 2013, she became a certified urologist after she passed the Part 2 West African College of Surgeons examination. She is a recent recipient of the First Awards known as the Zakilo Awards for pioneers in their field of endeavors in January 2019. She is a lecturer at the Lagos State University College of Medicine and an Honorary Consultant to the Lagos State University Teaching Hospital, Ikeja
