= Joseph Ugboaja =

Nigerian obstetrician and gynaecologist

Joseph Odirichukwu Ugboaja is a Nigerian obstetrician and gynaecologist. He is currently the Chief Medical Director of Nnamdi Azikiwe University Teaching Hospital (NAUTH) and an Officer of the Order of the Niger (OON).

== Education and career ==
Joseph Ugboaja holds a Bachelor of Medicine and Surgery (MBBS) degree. He is a Fellow of the National Postgraduate Medical College of Nigeria, West African College of Surgeons, International College of Surgeons, Minimal Access Surgery and the Institute of Management Consultants of Nigeria. Until his appointment as CMD, he served as the Chairman Medical Advisory Committee (CMAC) of NAUTH.
