= Charles Esimone =

Nigerian academic

Professor Charles Esimone
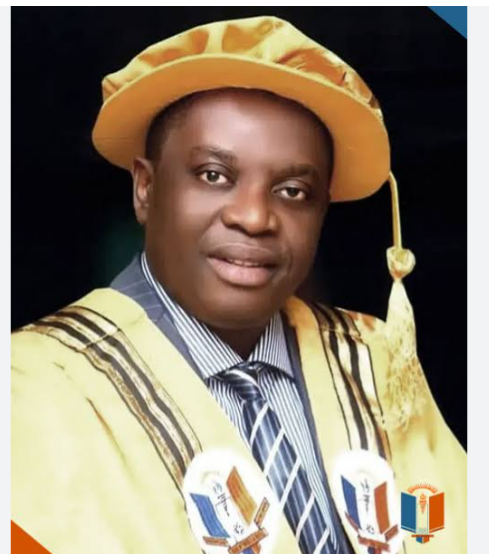

Vice Chancellor of Nnamdi Azikiwe University
- In office 2019–2024
- Preceded by: Joseph Ahaneku
- Succeeded by: Ugochukwu Bond Stanley Anyaehie

Personal details
- Born: 31 December 1970 (age 55)
- Education: Nnamdi Azikiwe University

Charles Okechukwu Esimone (born 29 December 1970) is a Nigerian professor of biopharmaceutics and pharmaceutical biotechnology who served as the vice-chancellor of Nnamdi Azikiwe University, Awka, Nigeria from 2019 to 2024. He is the first professor of pharmaceutical microbiology in South-Eastern Nigeria.

== Early life and education ==
Esimone was born on 29 December 1970 in Tiko, Cameroon. He earned a Bachelor of Pharmacy degree from the University of Nigeria Nsukka in 1995, followed by postgraduate studies in pharmaceutical microbiology and pharmaceutics, completing a PhD in 2002.

== Professional career ==
Esimone started his career as internee pharmacist and then became a laboratory instructor, all in the Department of Pharmaceutics, University of Nigeria Nsukka. He became a professor of biopharmaceutics and pharmaceutical microbiology at the age of 37 years and was the pioneer Dean, Faculty of Pharmaceutical Sciences, Agulu Campus of Nnamdi Azikiwe University Awka. He also served two terms of 2 years each as the Deputy Vice-Chancellor (Academics) of Nnamdi Azikiwe University, Awka.

He is a researcher with well over 100 publications and in May 2019 was ranked 18th on the list of 28 Most Published Scholars in Nigeria. Prof. Esimone was also the Director of Confucius Institute of Nnamdi Azikiwe University, Awka. On the 14 of May 2019 he was elected the new Vice Chancellor of Nnamdi Azikiwe University, Awka.

He is the State Campus Coordinator for Deeper Life Campus Fellowship, Anambra State and also a member, BOT (Board of Trustees) of Anchor University, Lagos.

== Research contributions ==
Esimone pioneered research in the use of recombinant viral vectors as surrogates for high-throughput antiviral screening studies, as well as on the use of indigenous medicinal plants as immunomodulators, vaccine adjuvants, and anti-infectives. The vector-based antiviral screening technique developed by Esimone between 2003 and 2005 in Germany significantly revolutionized high-throughput screening for anti-HIV compounds worldwide.

In addition to this work, his research led to the discovery of new antimicrobial compounds—including antibacterial, antifungal, and antiviral agents—derived from endophytes, lichens, ferns, herbs, and spices. Esimone was instrumental in the isolation and characterization of resistance genes from clinical settings, abattoirs, and poultry, with a particular focus on extended-spectrum beta-lactamases (ESBLs) and metallo-beta-lactamases (MBLs) identified in the southeastern regions of Nigeria.

His team became the first to demonstrate the presence of ESBL-producing bacteria harboring the CTXM-15 gene, which confers resistance to third-generation cephalosporins in Nigeria. Additionally, they were the first to identify MBL-producing bacteria containing the blaIMP-1 and blaVIM-1 genes within poultry and abattoirs in southeastern Nigeria. They also reported the increasing frequency of MBL-producing Klebsiella, Pseudomonas, and Escherichia species in the country.

Moreover, Esimone's research team was the first to demonstrate the occurrence of the FOX-1 gene, responsible for expressing the AmpC enzyme in gram-negative bacteria in Nigeria. This enzyme significantly enhances the ability of organisms to resist cephamycin antibiotics.

== Editorship of journals ==
- Editor-in-Chief, Journal of Current Biomedical Research (2017 to date)
- Associate Editor of African Journal of Pharmaceutical Sciences and Pharmacy
- Associate Editor, Journal of Pharmaceutical and Allied Sciences
- Member Editorial Board of American Journal of Pharmacotherapy and Pharmaceutical Sciences (2024)

== Membership of professional bodies ==
- Member of the Governing Council of the Pharmacists Council of Nigeria, Nnamdi Azikiwe University
- Member of the Nanomedicine Society of Nigeria
- Member of the Global Young Academy
- Member of the American Society for Cell biology
- Member of many other professional bodies including, Institute of Public Analysts of Nigeria; West African Society for Pharmacology, Nigeria; Society for Medicinal Plant Research, Germany; Pan African Medical Mycology Society, South Africa; International Society for Anti-infective Pharmacology; Materials Society of Nigeria; and, Nigerian Society of Forensic Scientists (Pioneer member of Board of Directors)

== Awards and recognition ==
Esimone is a recipient of several awards. They include:

- The Alexander von Humboldt Fellowship to Germany (2003–2005)
- Visiting Scientist to the University of Pittsburgh, (2007–2008)
- The ANDI Bright Contest Award for the Best African Innovative Researcher, South Africa (2009)
- Young Scientist (representing Nigeria) at the "Summer Davos" Annual Meeting of New Champions, Tianjin, China (2010)
- CV Raman Senior Fellowship, India (2013)
- Fellow of the Nigerian Academy of Science (2017)
- Pioneer national president of the Nanomedicine Society of Nigeria
- Recipient of various national and international grants and a reviewer to several national and international journals.

== Select academic publications ==
Esimone is one of the most published scholars in Nigeria: His publications have been cited 7,402 times according to the AD Scientific index ranking, and 7,463 times according to the Google Scholar index. Here are a select few:

- Esimone, Charles, MI Okeke, CU Iroegbu, EN Eze, AS Okoli, "Evaluation of extracts of the root of Landolphia owerrience for antibacterial activity", Journal of ethnopharmacology 78 (2-3), 119-127
- Esimone, Charles, KF Chah, CA Eze, CE Emuelosi, "Antibacterial and wound healing properties of methanolic extracts of some Nigerian medicinal plants", Journal of ethnopharmacology 104 (1-2), 164-167
- Esimone, Charles, CS Nworu, CL Jackson, "Cutaneous wound healing activity of a herbal ointment containing the leaf extract of Jatropha curcas L.(Euphorbiaceae)", International Journal of Applied Research in Natural Products 1 (4), 1-4
- Esimone, Charles, IR Iroha, EC Ibezim, CO Okeh, EM Okpana, "In vitro evaluation of the interaction between tea extracts and penicillin G against Staphylococcus aureus", African Journal of Biotechnology 5 (11)
- Esimone, Charles, PA Ekwealor, MC Ugwu, I Ezeobi, G Amalukwe, BC Ugwu, U Okezie et al., "Antimicrobial evaluation of bacterial isolates from urine specimen of patients with complaints of urinary tract infections in Awka, Nigeria", International journal of microbiology 2016 (1), 9740273

== Personal life ==
Esimone is married to Dr. Celestina Chinyere Esimone who is an Associate Professor of Music. They have five children: a son, and a set of quadruplets (two boys and two girls).
