= Olajide Aluko =

Nigerian professor of International relations and writer

- Born: June 3, 1942; Ise Ekiti, Nigeria
- Died: March 5, 1991 (aged 48)
- Occupations: academic; writer; professor
- Spouse: Ekundayo Monilola Aluko
- Children: 5

Academic background
- Education: University of Ibadan; University of London

Academic work
- Discipline: International Relations

Olajide Aluko (3 June 1942 – 5 March 1991) was a Nigerian scholar who in October 1977 became the first professor of international relations in Sub-Saharan Africa. He was also said to be the doyen of International Relations. He was a prolific writer and conference speaker who wrote and edited several books and journals concerning international relations.

== Early life and education ==
Aluko was born on 3 June 1942 into a Christian family in Ise-Ekiti, in Ondo State (present day Ekiti State)

He attended St Mark's Primary School, Ise-Ekiti, From there, he proceeded, in 1955, to Ekiti Parapo College, Ido Ekiti, which had been established in 1954 by Chief Adepoju Akomolafe. He was the Head Prefect in 1959. He went on to study at the Nigerian College of Arts and Science from where he proceeded to the University of Ibadan where he graduated top of his class with a B.A. History in 1965 and was awarded the best student in History during the 1964/65 session.

On completing his degree, he travelled to London to further his studies at the London School of Economics, University of London where he graduated with a master's degree in economics (Msc. Econs) in 1966, and went on to complete his doctorate (Ph.D) in international relations and upon returning to Nigeria, he was awarded a professor of international relations at the age of 35 years in 1977, becoming the first professor of international relations in Sub-Saharan Africa.

== Views and works ==
Olajide Aluko mostly favoured Hans Morgenthau's view of realistic foreign policy in his studies of Nigeria and Africa's foreign policy. In some of his early writings during the oil boom era of the 1970s, he leaned towards the viewpoint of a strong and powerful Nigerian nation, where the potential benefits of the country's natural resources such as oil and agro-commodities could be utilized to generate internal economic strength. The corollary to this would be the nation maximizing its strength in regional and international politics and devising its policies based on its internal economic, political, and social interests. However, with the fall in oil price, the illusion of a powerful Nigeria or stable foreign policy was shattered by the early 1980s. Professor Aluko later often argued against Nigeria's march towards grandeur in foreign policy. He believed it would transfer national resources and energy towards regionalisation when Nigeria was still mired in poverty and had little economic and political stability to earn respect among other nations.

== Career ==
After he was awarded a PhD in international relations at the London School of Economics, University of London, he returned to Nigeria, where he took up a position as a lecturer of international relations at the former Institute of Administration, University of Ife. Under his leadership, the former institute of Administration was reconstituted into the Faculty of Administration on 5 March 1976. He founded the first Department of International Relations in Sub-Sahara Africa where he became the Head of Department from 1976 1981 and subsequently was appointed as Dean, Faculty of Administration in 1981 and served till the end of his tenure in 1985.

Jide Aluko contributed significantly to the study of international relations in Africa. He was the professor who pioneered the study of international relations in Africa. In 1971, he launched the postgraduate diploma and master's degree programme in international relations at the University of Ife (now Obafemi Awolowo University, Ile-Ife) He was the sole author of four internationally acclaimed books on government, international relations and foreign policy. He also co-authored seven books on international relations. In addition, he had to his credit over forty-five single authored publications in local and international journals across many countries in the world.

Jide Aluko, was a recipient of several international awards and honors notably: Departmental Prize, best student in History, 1964/65 sessions, University of Ibadan, visiting professor, Fellowship awarded by the Social Sciences and Humanities Research Council of Canada, Dalhousie University, Halifax, 1978; The Rockefeller Fellowship to study in the Rockefeller Study Centre, Bellagio, Italy in April/May 1989. He served the Federal Government of Nigeria in various capacities within and outside the country and other African countries on policy issues.

He gave annual lectures at the National Institute of Policy and Strategic Studies, Kuru since 1979 and participated in several seminars organised by the Federal Government of Nigeria and the Nigeria Army.

He was the chairman of the Nigerian Society of International Affairs in 1974-1975, and President from 1981 – 1983. He was a member of several local and international professional bodies including the Canadian Association of Africa Affairs, International Institute of Strategic Studies UK, Royal Institute of International affairs. He was a Fellow of the Nigerian Institute of International Affairs, Lagos and a member of the Governing Council of the Foreign Service Academy of the Ministry of External Affairs, Lagos from 1980 till 1988. He lectured at the Hebrew University of Jerusalem from 1989 -1990 and proceeded to become a visiting professor at the Johns Hopkins University, Baltimore, U.S.A in 1990.

== Personal life, death and legacy ==
Olajide Aluko married Ekundayo Monilola Aluko and together they have five children. He died on 5 March 1991 at the age of 49. Since his death, his former students and associates have immortalised his name, for example Professor Olusoji Akomolafe, along with one of his junior colleagues, late Professor Olayiwola Abegunrin, have brought together a string of his former students to write “Nigeria in Global Politics; Twentieth Century. In his honour, Prof Tale Omole, the former Vice Chancellor of Obafemi Awolowo University 2011 - 2016 publicly acknowledged him in his Inaugural lecture, “Nigeria, France and the Francophone States”, delivered in May 2010, and Professor Abiodun Alao, a Professor of African Studies at the African Leadership Centre King's College London, dedicated the book “Mugabe and the Politics of Security in Zimbabwe” to his memory.

In 2013, some of his students joined the family in establishing the Professor Olajide Aluko Educational Memorial Foundation (POAEMF) in his memory.

== Selected publications ==
- Essays in Nigerian Foreign Policy. Unwin Hyman December 1981, ISBN 99924-40-65-1
- Ghana and Nigeria, 1957-70. Africa Book Centre Ltd July 1977, ISBN 0-901720-92-5
- Foreign Policies of African States. Editor, Hodder Arnold April 10, 1977. ISBN 0-340-21030-3
- Africa and the Great Powers in the 1980s. Editor, Univ Pr of Amer November 1987. ISBN 0-8191-5592-6
- The Future of Africa and the New International Economic Order Nieo. Co-editor, Palgrave Macmillan April 1986, ISBN 0-312-31412-4
- Southern Africa in the 1980s. Editor, Allen & Unwin Pty., Limited Australia, April 1985, ISBN 0-04-320169-5
- The Political Economy of African Foreign Policy: Comparative Analysis, editor. Palgrave Macmillan August 1984. ISBN 0-312-62253-8.
