= Ayo Aderinwale =

Nigerian diplomat

Ayodele Patrick Aderinwale MFR is the executive director of the Africa Leadership Forum (ALF) in Ota, Nigeria.

== Work ==
Aderinwale provides consulting services for several international agencies including the United Nations, the European Union and the former Organization of Africa Unity, now known as the African Union. He participated in the initial drafting of the Millennium Plan for Africa which later became the New Partnership for Africa's Development and was an inaugural member of the Nigeria Steering Committee of the Africa Peer Review Mechanism.

Ayo serves in various board and he is part of the boards of directors of Justrite Limited and the Business School Netherlands and chairman of the board of governors of the Bells Educational Services, as well as the Bells Comprehensive Secondary School for Boys and Girls.

=== Africa Leadership Forum ===
As the executive director of ALF, he began several programs such as the Regional African Parliamentarians Conference, the Africa Women's Forum, the Legislative Internship Programme and the Democratic Leadership Training Workshop. He helped to create the Conference on Stability, Security, Development and Cooperation in Africa which was adopted by the African Union in 2002.

Presently, he is the deputy chief co-ordinator at the Olusegun Obasanjo Presidential Library while Obansanjo remains the chief co-ordinator.

== National honours ==
On 21 December 2006, the President of Nigeria, Olusegun Obasanjo, conferred on him the membership of the Order of the Federal Republic. His classmates and colleagues launched a foundation, the Ayodele Aderinwale Foundation for Education and Leadership in Africa in his honor, which provides scholarships to young boys and girls in schools across Nigeria.
