= Omokhudu Idogho =

Omokhudu Idogho is a Nigerian physician and public health specialist who serves as the managing director of the Society for Family Health (SFH) Nigeria, a non-governmental organization focused on reproductive health, family planning, HIV/AIDS prevention, malaria control, and primary healthcare services in Nigeria.

== Education ==
Idogho obtained a Bachelor of Medicine, Bachelor of Surgery (MBBS) from the University of Benin in 1995. He later earned a Master of Public Administration (MPA) from the University of Ilorin in 2006 and a Master of Public Health (MPH) from the University of South Africa in 2010.

== Career ==
Idogho began his career as a Medical Officer of Health at the local government level in Nigeria. He subsequently worked as a Health Advisor with WaterAid in Benue State, where he was involved in public health and community health programmes.

He later joined the Society for Family Health, holding several positions including Programme Director for the Enhancing Nigeria's Response to HIV/AIDS Programme (2009–2014), Director of the Expanded Enterprise Project, Deputy Managing Director, and Head of the Innovation Hub.

On 1 January 2019, Idogho was appointed managing director of SFH Nigeria, succeeding Bright Ekweremadu.

His work has included contributions to programmes related to family planning, maternal and child health, HIV prevention, and health systems development. He has also co-authored research on community-based family planning distribution and public health interventions.

Idogho is based in Abuja, Nigeria.
