= Olusoga Sofola =

Nigerian Professor

- Born: Ogun State, Nigeria
- Citizenship: Nigerian
- Occupations: physiologist; Educationist; researcher

Olusoga Sofola is a Nigerian Professor of Physiology and former Vice Chancellor of Olabisi Onabanjo University. He is currently the treasurer of Nigerian Academy of Science. He was formerly an academic staff at the University of Lagos, where he taught Physiology. He served as Provost of the College of Medicine, University of Lagos before he rose to the position of Deputy Vice Chancellor (Academics). In 2009, he was appointed as Vice Chancellor of Olabisi Onabanjo University, Ogun State, Nigeria.
