= Ise Ekiti =

City in Ekiti state

Ise Ekiti Ùsẹ̀
- Motto: Akinludase á gbe á o!
- Location in Nigeria
- Coordinates: 7°27′36″N 5°25′12″E
- Country: Nigeria
- State: Ekiti State
- LGA: Ise/Orun

Ise Ekiti (Yoruba: Ìṣẹ̀-Èkìtì, also Ise) is a city in Ekiti State, Nigeria. It is the traditional home of Akinluaduse, also known as Akinluse by the inhabitants of the city. Akinluse was a great warrior in the ancient ife Empire. Ise-Ekiti is the headquarters of the Ise/Orun Local Government Area, along with Orun. Its geographic coordinates are 7°27′36″N 5°25′12″E. Ise ekiti is divided into three quarters namely; Oraye, Odo Ise and Erinwa. The Arinjale of Ise-Ekiti is Oba Ayodele Ajayi Aweloye II. .

As of 2007 Ise local government had an estimated population of 204,022.
