= Adesola Adedayo =

Nigerian politician

Federal Representative
- Preceded by: Mufutau Egberongbe
- Constituency: Apapa

Personal details
- Party: All Progressive Congress (APC)
- Occupation: Politician

Adesola Samuel Adedayo is a Nigerian doctor and politician. He currently serves as a member of the House of Representatives, representing the Apapa Federal Constituency in the 10th National Assembly. Adedayo is also the Deputy Chairman of the House of Representatives Committee on Health. He is also a two-term Chairman of the Apapa-Iganmu Local Council Development Area (LCDA). He succeeded Mufutau Egberongbe.
