= Abiola Odejide =

Nigerian academic

Emeritus Professor of Communication and Language Arts at University of Ibadan
- In office 2011–present

Professor of Communication and Language Arts at University of Ibadan
- In office 1991–2011

Deputy Vice Chancellor (academic) at University of Ibadan
- In office November 8, 2004 – November 7, 2006

Personal details
- Born: 17 April 1946 (age 80)
- Education: University of Ibadan (Bachelor of Arts in English); University of Leeds ( Master of Arts in Linguistics and English Language Teaching); University of Ibadan (Doctor of Philosophy in English: Children Literature)

Abiola Odejide is an emeritus professor of communication and language arts at University of Ibadan. She was previously the deputy vice chancellor at the university and was the first woman to attain such position at the 58-year-old university.

== Early life and education ==
Odejide had her first degree in English, graduating with a second class upper at University of Ibadan in 1968. She then proceeded to University of Leeds to obtain a master's degree in Linguistics and English Language Teaching, finishing with distinction in 1974. Her PhD thesis on Children literature was completed at Ibadan in 1986. She became a full professor at University of Ibadan in 1991.

== Publications ==
In a 2014 article titled "What can a woman do?" Gender norms in a Nigerian university written for Feminist Africa, Odejide opined that gender discrimination which is contrary to the constitution of the university remains a prevalent issue in the school. She identified mindsets that labelled women as "quarrelsome", "less academically gifted", "shallow thinkers" and "being malicious" as responsible for the persistence of such biased, hierarchical gender ideologies. She also noted that despite the educational exposure of an academic community such as Unibadan, its inhabitants still allow traditions positing gender supremacy to play a major role in their affairs. In her recommendation, she proposed an entrepreneurial program that would improve women's self-sufficiency. She also advocated for effective policies by management that would promote gender equality.

In 2017, Odejide gave a lecture at a conference tagged Thirty Years on: What Do Women Want, What Should Women Want?. In her speech, she admonished the Nigerian government to make decisive decisions to promote gender fairness. She cited women heads of state around the world as an example of how Nigeria can be better when women are given the opportunity. She also decried the cabinet of the president as having a lower percentage of women than its predecessors, stating that it showed a lack of belief in women.

== Administrative positions ==
Odejide was the first female deputy vice chancellor at University of Ibadan. Additionally, she has previously held various core positions at the university including director, Distance Learning Center. She retired from the Unibadan in November 2011
