= Nnamdi Nwauwa =

Nnamdi Nwauwa

Nnamdi Nwauwa (1954–2018) was a Nigerian medical doctor. The first Chairman of the Society of Emergency Medical Practitioners of Nigeria (SEMPON) and of the Advanced Trauma Life Support (ATLS) chapter in Nigeria, he is generally regarded as a pioneer of emergency medicine in Nigeria (Father of Emergency in Nigeria).

== BLS, ACLS and PALS in Nigeria ==
Nnamdi Nwauwa Introduced the American Heart Association Emergency cardiovascular care(ECC) programs in 2003 and became the second center coordinator in Africa after South Africa and the first AHA training center coordinator in west Africa. He secured the first CME points and recognition of AHA ECC programs by the Medical and Dental Council of Nigeria and secured the approval of AHA ECC programs by the Nursing and midwifery council.

== ATLS in Nigeria ==
Advanced Trauma Life Support program was introduced by The American college of surgeons In 2009 through the National Orthopedic Association(NOA) and Emergency Response International under the leadership of Nnamdi Nwauwa as the course chairman and Bob Yellowe as the course director.

== Achievements ==
- First African Recipient of the prestigious World best 10 EMS innovators for 2015 at EMS today in Baltimore, USA (Feb 2016).
- First Nigerian Recipient of the American Heart Association award for pioneering Emergency Cardiovascular Care programs in Nigeria at the International Federation for Emergency Medicine (IFEM) 2016 in Cape Town).
- International Appointment as Member of the EMS International Advisory Board of the Australasian Registrar of the Emergency Medical Technicians for Middle East and Africa.
- International Appointment as Member of the International Editorial Board for the Journal of Emergency Medical Services,(JEMS) USA.
- Represented Nigeria in the board of African Federation for Emergency Medicine(AFEM) and non voting member in International Federation for Emergency Medicine(IFEM).
- He led the advocacy through SEMPON for the establishment of Emergency Medicine Residency in Nigeria with various institutions around the world to assist to develop Emergency Medicine in Nigeria and was part of the committee setup by the National Post Graduate Medical College of Nigeria to establish the faculty of Emergency medicine in Nigeria.

== Publications ==
- Characteristics and capabilities of emergency departments in Abuja, Nigeria – Texila international journal 2015 (review article).
- Reasons for delay in patient admission at an emergency department – Texila international journal 2015 (review article).
