= Pharmaceutical microbiology =

Pharmaceutical microbiology is an applied branch of microbiology. It involves the study of microorganisms associated with the manufacture of pharmaceuticals e.g. minimizing the number of microorganisms in a process environment, excluding microorganisms and microbial byproducts like exotoxin and endotoxin from water and other starting materials, and ensuring the finished pharmaceutical product is sterile. Other aspects of pharmaceutical microbiology include the research and development of anti-infective agents, the use of microorganisms to detect mutagenic and carcinogenic activity in prospective drugs, and the use of microorganisms in the manufacture of pharmaceutical products like insulin and human growth hormone.

== Drug safety ==
Drug safety is a major focus of pharmaceutical microbiology. Pathogenic bacteria, fungi (yeasts and moulds) and toxins produced by microorganisms are all possible contaminants of medicines- although stringent, regulated processes are in place to ensure the risk is minimal.

== Antimicrobial activity and disinfection ==
Another major focus of pharmaceutical microbiology is to determine how a product will react in cases of contamination. For example: You have a bottle of cough medicine. Imagine you take the lid off, pour yourself a dose and forget to replace the lid. You come back to take your next dose and discover that you will indeed left the lid off for a few hours. What happens if a microorganism "fell in" whilst the lid was off? There are tests that look at that. The product is "challenged" with a known amount of specific microorganisms, such as E. coli and C. albicans and the anti-microbial activity monitored

Pharmaceutical microbiology is additionally involved with the validation of disinfectants, either according to U.S. AOAC or European CEN standards, to evaluate the efficacy of disinfectants in suspension, on surfaces, and through field trials. Field trials help to establish the frequency of the application of detergents and disinfectants.

== Methods and specifications ==
Testing of pharmaceutical products is carried out according to a Pharmacopeia of which there are a few types. For example: In America, the United States Pharmacopeia is used; in Japan there is the Japanese Pharmacopeia; in the United Kingdom there is the British Pharmacopoeia and in Europe the European Pharmacopeia. These contain a test method which is to be followed when testing, along with defined specifications for the amount of microorganisms allowed in a given amount of product.

The specifications change depending on the product type and method in which it is introduced to the body. The pharmacopoeia also covers areas like sterility testing, endotoxin testing, the use of biological indicators, microbial limits testing and enumeration, and the testing of pharmaceutical grade water.

== Cleanrooms and controlled environments ==
Pharmaceutical microbiologists are required to assess cleanrooms and controlled environments for contamination (viable and particulate) and to introduce contamination control strategies. This includes an understanding of risk assessment.

Risk management has been successfully employed in various industrial sectors like US Space industry (NASA), nuclear power industry and automobile industry which benefited these industries in several areas. But in application, the pharmaceutical sector is still in its infancy and the utilization of risk assessment techniques to pharmaceutical production is just beginning and the potential gains are yet to be realized.

Cleanrooms and zones are typically classified according to their use (the main activity within each room or zone) and confirmed by the cleanliness of the air by the measurement of particles. Cleanrooms are microbiologically assessed through environmental monitoring methods.

Viable monitoring is designed to detect levels of bacteria and fungi present in defined locations /areas during a particular stage in the activity of processing and filling a product. Viable monitoring is designed to detect mesophilic micro-organisms in the aerobic state. However, some manufacturers may have requirements to examine for other types of microorganisms (such as anaerobes if nitrogen lines are used as part of the manufacturing process).

Surface methods include testing various Surfaces for numbers of microorganisms, such as:

• Product Contact Surfaces • Floors • Walls • Ceilings

Using techniques like:

• Contact Plates • Touch Plates • Swabs • Surface Rinse Method

For air monitoring, this is undertaken using agar settle plates (placed in the locations of greatest risk) or active (volumetric) air-samplers (to provide a quantitative assessment of the number of microorganisms in the air per volume of air sampled). Active air-samplers generally fall into the following different models:

• Slit to Agar • Membrane Filtration • Centrifugal Samplers

Monitoring methods will all use either a general purpose culture medium like tryptone soya agar (TSA), which will be used at a dual incubation regime of 30 °C – 35 °C and 20 °C – 25 °C or two different culture media are used at two different temperatures, of which one of the media is selective for fungi (e.g. Sabouraud Dextrose agar, SDA). The choice of culture media, incubation times and temperatures requires validating.

== Professional guidance ==
The main sources of education and professional guidance for pharmaceutical microbiology come from Dr Tim Sandle's Pharmaceutical Microbiology Resources, Dr Scott Sutton's Microbiology Network, and the UK and Ireland Pharmaceutical Microbiology Interest Group (Pharmig).
