= Olubola Babalola =

Nigerian quantity surveyor and academic

Olubola Babalola is a Nigerian quantity surveyor, academic and researcher. She is a professor at the Obafemi Awolowo University, (OAU), Ile-Ife, where she has taught since 1993. She is the first female professor of quantity surveying in Africa. She served as the Dean of the Faculty of Environmental Design and Management at Obafemi Awolowo University, Ile-Ife, Nigeria.

== Awards and recognition ==
Professor Babalola has received:

- The Most Distinguished Ibadan Indigene by the Central Council of Ibadan Indigenes.
- Carnegie of US Fellowship for Female academics on Ph.D. programme.
