= Nnamdi Azikiwe University Teaching Hospital =

Government owned hospital in Nigeria

Coordinates: 4°38′49″N 7°56′34″E

Geography
- Location: Anambra, Nigeria

Organisation
- Affiliated university: Nnamdi Azikiwe University

Services
- Emergency department: Yes

History
- Opened: 9 July 1991

Links
- Lists: Hospitals in Nigeria

Nnamdi Azikiwe University Teaching Hospital is a Federal Government of Nigeria Teaching Hospital located in Nnewi, Anambra state. The current Chief Medical Director is Joseph Ugboaja.

The teaching hospital was alleged to detain patients who could not pay for their treatment in 2019. The then Chief Medical Director (CMD), Prof. Anthony Igwegbe, clarified the issue of the hospital's policy on detaining patients for non-payment of hospital bills. According to him, “We do not trap anybody. We offer services to our patients and they are expected to pay thereafter. We use our facilities, drugs, expertise and materials. At the end of the day, patients are expected to pay so we can replenish those things to treat others.” He also stated that “some philanthropists pay occasional visits to the hospital, especially during festivities, to offset bills for indigent patients.”

== History ==
The Nnamdi Azikiwe University Teaching Hospital was established by the Anambra State Government edict number 10 of 1988 as the Anambra State University of Technology Teaching Hospital, Nnewi and shared premises with the then General Hospital, Nnewi. On 16 June 1990, the General Hospital merged with the Nnamdi Azikiwe University Teaching Hospital.

It was then officially commissioned on 19 July 1991, by the then Military Governor, Robert Akonobi.

The hospital was renamed by the Federal Government of Nigeria to Nnamdi Azikiwe University Teaching Hospital through decree number 68 in 1992, in honour of Nnamdi Azikiwe.

== Nnamdi Azikiwe University Teaching Hospital Cancer Registry ==
Nnamdi Azikiwe University Teaching Hospital Nnewi is recognized as one the Cancer treatment Centers in Nigeria. In 2009, the Cancer Registry of the Nnamdi Azikiwe University Teaching Hospital was established as Hospital Based Cancer Registry. The registry is with the Pathology Department of Nnamdi Azikiwe University Teaching Hospital, Awka. Over the years since its establishment, the registry has recorded thousands of cancer cases from various departments in the hospital.

In 2022, Nnamdi Azikiwe University Teaching Hospital, Nnewi was mapped out for the construction of Cancer Treatment Centre. The project code was ERGP25179042 under the FEDERAL MINISTRY OF HEALTH AND SOCIAL WELFARE . The total appropriation of N250000000.00 was announced with an annual appropriation of N250000000.0.

== Departments ==
The hospital consists of five Outstations namely:

- The Centre for Community Medicine and Primary Health Care, Neni, Anaocha L.G.A
- The Centre of Community Medicine and Primary Health Care, Ukpo, Dunukofia L.G. A.
- The Trauma Centre, Oba, Idemili South L.G. A.
- Federal Staff Clinic, Awka, Awka South L.G. A.
- Comprehensive Health Centre, Umunya, Oyi L.G. A
