= Tella Adeyinka =

Nigerian librarian

Adeyinka Tella
- Born: Adeyinka; February 10, 1972 (age 54)
- Education: St.Andrews College of Education (NCE); University of Ibadan (B.sc); University of Ibadan (M.Sc); University of Botswana (Ph.D)
- Occupation: Librarian Lecturer
- Employer: University of Ilorin
- Notable work: Social Media Strategies for Dynamic Library Service Development; Perception and Use of YouTube by Music Lecturers and Librarians in Selected Tertiary Institutions in Kwara State, Nigeria; Assessment of Nigerian University Library Web Sites/Web Pages; The perspective of undergraduate students on information needs and seeking behavior through YouTube; Attitudinal Correlates of Selected Nigerian Librarians Towards the Use of Information Technology
- Title: Professor
- Awards: Commonwealth Scholarship (2005); Federal Government of Nigeria Postgraduate Scholarship Award (2002); CODESRIA Award (2007)

Adeyinka Tella (born 1972) is a librarian and Nigerian professor at the University of Ilorin Nigeria, he is also the current editor-in-chief, Ilorin University International Journal of Library and Information Science.

== Early life and education ==
Adeyinka born on 10 February 1972, began his educational journey at St. Andrews College of Education, Oyo, Nigeria, where he earned a National Certificate in Education (NCE) in 1992. This foundational qualification marked his entry into the teaching profession. Subsequently, he pursued higher education at the University of Ibadan, Nigeria where he obtained a bachelor's degree in Guidance and Counselling/Political Science. He pursued further studies at the University of Ibadan, completing dual master's degree programs. His first master's degree in Counselling Psychology was followed by a second Master's in Library and Information Studies in 2004, and culminated in a Ph.D. from the Department of Library and Information Studies, University of Botswana in 2009.

== Career ==
With over 200 published academic papers, he has made contributions to research with a focus on areas such as ICT for Development, e-learning, information literacy, and information communication technology in libraries. He has authored numerous articles in reputable international journals and contributed chapters to scholarly books. He served as the chairman of the Nigerian Library Association Kwara State Branch, and vice chairman of the Nigerian Association of Library and Information Science Educators, he is also a member of editorial board for several Web of Science and Scopus-based LIS journals, Library Philosophy and Practice, University of Nebraska Lincoln, USA, Journal of University Research, Maltepe University, Istanbul, Turkey. African Regional Journal of Information and Knowledge Management, Technical University, Kenya. Zambian Journal of Library and Information Science, University of Zambia. Adeyinka Tella is currently the head of the Department of Library and Information Science, University of Ilorin

== Awards and recognition ==
Adeyinka contributions to academia have been recognized through various awards and accolades. In February 2022 he was rated C2 Researcher by the South African National Research Foundation. Also in 2015 he was rated 28th scientist in Nigeria by Webometrics.

Awards

- Dr. T.M. Salisu Award for Most Published Librarian in 2015, 2017, and 2018, by the Nigerian Library Association.
- Commonwealth Scholarship – 2005
- Federal Government of Nigeria Postgraduate Scholarship Award- 2002
- CODESRIA Award for Small Grant for Thesis Writing - 2007
- Visiting research fellow by the Department of Information Science, University of South Africa in Pretoria South Africa 2016–2019

Visiting professor, Department of Information and Science, UNISA, 2019-2020

== Notable works ==
Selected academic publications

- Work motivation, job satisfaction, and organisational commitment of library personnel in academic and research libraries in Oyo State, Nigeria
- Correlates of academic procrastination and mathematics achievement of university undergraduate students
- An Assessment of Secondary School Teachers Uses of ICT's: Implications for Further Development of ICT's Use in Nigerian Secondary Schools.
- Teacher variables as predictors of academic achievement of primary school pupils mathematics
- University Undergraduate Students' Information Seeking Behaviour: Implications for Quality in Higher Education in Africa.
- ICT and Entrepreneurship in Information: Perspectives from Developing Digital Economies
- Revitalizing the library through usability features of the university library websites
- The green library revolution: a catalyst for climate change action
- 9 Exploration of Data Sharing and Information Exchange among Nigerian Library and Information Science Researchers
- Using WhatsApp as a medium of postgraduate instruction in a private university in Nigeria: fall-outs of the COVID-19 Pandemic
- Teaching and Learning Online During COVID-19 Lockdown, Encouraging and Discouraging? The Perspectives of Students and Staff of Library and Information Science in Nigerian
- Nigerian LIS Research in the Post-COVID-19 Era
- The factors determining knowledge sharing intention among information professionals in Nigeria
- Information Literacy and Lifelong Learning
- Science in Developing Countries: Contemporary Issues
- Perceived Academic Performance and Attitude of Undergraduates Enrolled in Library and Information Science Research Methodology Course
- Cataloguing and classification in the era of artificial intelligence: Benefits, and challenges from the perspective of cataloguing librarians in Oyo State, Nigeria
- Access to full-text documents in libraries via Sci-Hub: a blessing in disguise to library users
- Opportunities and Challenges of E-Book Readers and Mobile Devices in Libraries: Experiences From Nigeria
- Usage of Social Media for 2019 Electoral Peace Campaign by Non-Governmental Organizations in Kwara State, Nigeria.
- Resource Sharing: Vehicle for Effective Library Information Dissemination and Services in The Digital Age
- Adoption of a quadratic usage framework for predicting blockchain use intention from the perspective of librarians in Southwest Nigerian universities.
