= Ayo Bankole =

Nigerian composer and organist

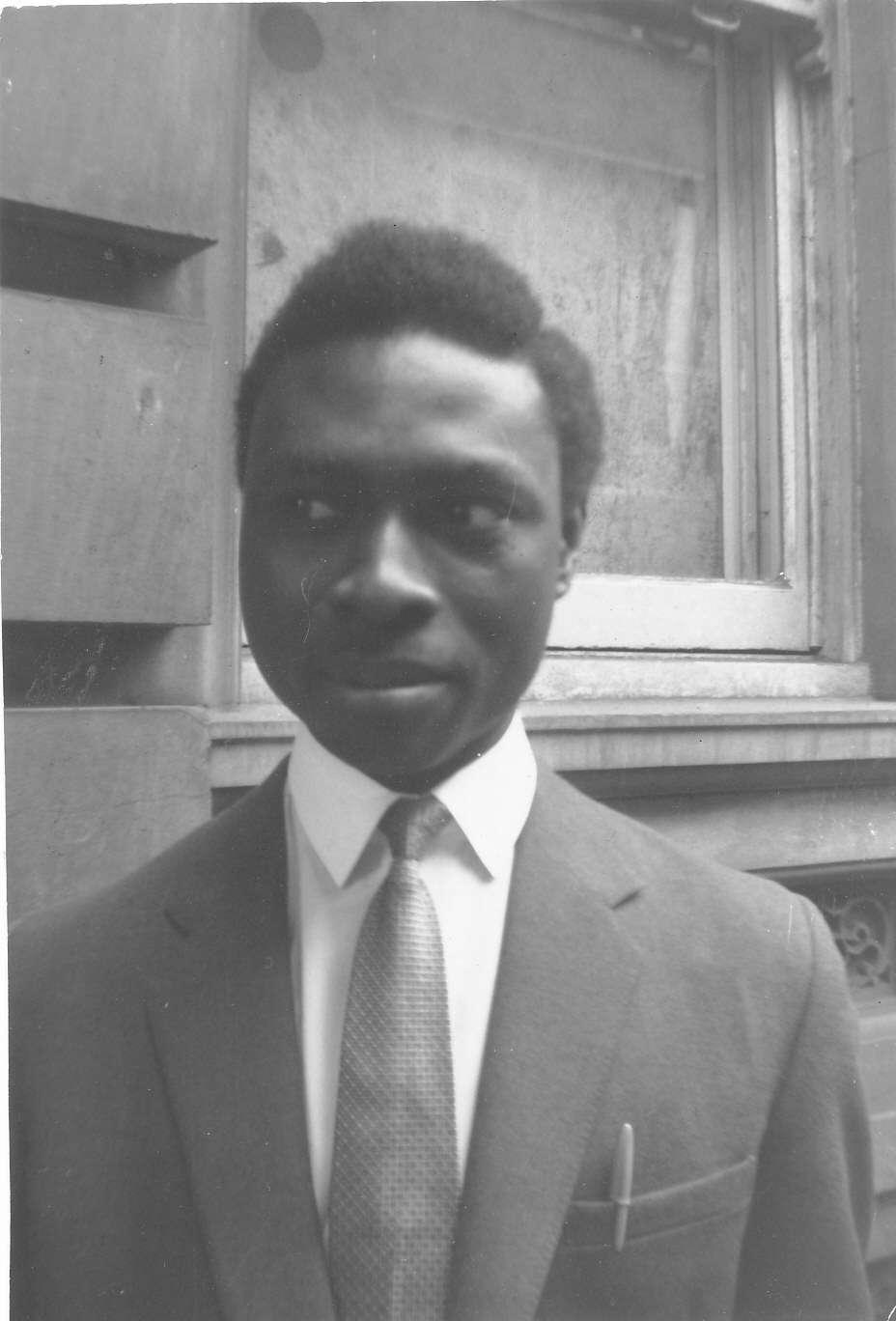
- Bankole in 1960
- Born: 17 May 1935; Jos, Nigeria
- Died: 6 November 1976 (aged 41); Lagos
- Education: Guildhall School of Music and Drama
- Occupations: Composer and organist
- Spouse: Toro Bankole

Ayo Bankole (17 May 1935 – 6 November 1976) was a composer and organist from the Yoruba ethnic group in southwest Nigeria.

== Early life and education ==
Ayo Bankole was born in Jos, Nigeria, into a musical family: his father, Theophilus Abiodun Bankole was an organist and Choirmaster at St. Luke's Anglican Church in Jos. His mother was a music instructor for several years at Queen's School, Ede, Osun State, a Federal government high school.

Bankole studied in London at the Guildhall School of Music and Drama. There he met drama student and poet Brian Edward Hurst and set one of Hurst's poems, "Children of the Sun", to music; this was performed at the Guildhall School in 1960. He also studied at Clare College, Cambridge and received a Rockefeller Foundation Fellowship to study ethnomusicology at the University of California, Los Angeles.

== Musical career ==
Bankole returned to Nigeria in 1966 and was appointed Senior Producer in Music at the Nigerian Broadcasting Corporation, Lagos, where he worked until 1969, after which he was appointed lecturer in music at the School of African and Asian Studies, University of Lagos.

He worked as a music educator, composer, choral conductor, performer and musicologist with independent choral groups, including the Choir of Angels (students from three high schools in Lagos: Reagan Memorial, Lagos Anglican Girls Grammar School, and the Methodist Girls High School), Lagos University Musical Society, Nigerian National Musico-Cultural Society, and the Chapel of the Healing Cross Choir, all in Lagos. He wrote much Christian liturgical music in the Yoruba language and his compositions show elements of both traditional Nigerian music and Western classical music. He also composed theme songs for some Nigerian television drama series.

One of his major late works was FESTAC Cantata No. 4, composed for soloists, chorus, organ, orchestra, and Nigerian traditional instruments. The work was associated with the Second World Black and African Festival of Arts and Culture (FESTAC) and was premiered in 1976 at the Cathedral Church of Christ in Lagos under the composer's direction.

== Style and compositions ==
Ayo Bankole is regarded as one of the pioneer composers of modern Nigerian art music. His compositional style reflects a synthesis of Western classical traditions and African musical elements, particularly those derived from Yoruba music.

His works include compositions for organ, piano, choir, and solo voice, many of which are intended for Christian liturgical use. His music is characterized by rhythmic vitality, modal inflections, and the integration of indigenous musical idioms within a Western formal framework.

== Death ==
Bankole died in 1976 in Lagos under tragic circumstances. Some accounts indicate that he was killed by a family member.
