= AYO Foods =

American food company

- Founded: 2020, Chicago, Illinois, United States
- Founder: Fred and Perteet Spencer
- Products: Frozen food and hot sauces

AYO Foods is an American food company specializing in foods from West African cuisine. The company was founded in 2020 in Chicago, Illinois, by Fred and Perteet Spencer, and produces frozen and boxed foods and hot sauces.

== History ==
AYO Foods ("Ayo" is Yoruba for "joy") was started by Fred and Perteet Spencer. Fred Spencer is a businessman from Chicago, and his wife Perteet a first-generation Liberian-American who learned to cook West African food from her father, who migrated from Lofa County in Liberia to Minnesota. Fred had mentioned the idea to her in 2011 already, and in 2020, during the COVID epidemic, Perteet commenting that people eating more at home during the epidemic may have helped their business. As of 2022, their foods are available in supermarkets across the United States.
