= Seiyefa Fun-Akpa Brisibe =

Nigerian academic and administrator

Seiyefa Fun-Akpa Brisibe is a Nigerian medical professional, academic, professor of family medicine and the Commissioner of Health in Bayelsa State government. He served as a dean of clinical services at Niger Delta University Teaching Hospital between August 2008 to December 2012. He was appointed by the government of Nigeria to serve as co-chairman of the National Emergency Medical Treatment Committee.

== Early life and education ==
Brisibe was born at Sampou, Kolokuma/Opokuma local government area of Bayelsa State, Nigeria. He obtained a Bachelor of Medicine, Bachelor of Surgery at the University of Port Harcourt, following the completion of a compulsory National Youth Service Corps program, he furthered his studies in family medicine and proceeded to pursue an MSc degree in health economics and policy at the University of Birmingham. After which he got an executive MBA from the London Metropolitan University and a diploma in development management from Coventry University UK.

== Career ==
Brisibe began his career as an accident and emergency doctor at the University of Port Harcourt Teaching Hospital in 1996, where he rose to the rank of a resident doctor in 2001, before he later become a full professor of family medicine in 2008.

== Public services ==
Brisibe served as a Dean of Clinical Sciences at Niger Delta University. In 2011-2012 he served as a Health Desk Officer and Head of Conditional Grants Scheme at the Office of the Senior Special Assistant to the Nigerian President Goodluck Jonathan on MDGs. He has also served as a consultant for the Department for International Development (DFID), the European Union (EU), and the United Nations Development Programme (UNDP) and the Oloibiri Health Programme (OHP) .

== Research and honour ==
Brisibe's research interest is focused on family health and accessible healthcare. Since he became a professor, he had supervised several undergraduate and postgraduate students. He had published several scholarly articles in reputable academic journal as well as conference abstracts and monograph.
