= Oluwaserimi Adewumi Ajetunmobi =

Nigerian physician and politician

Dr. Oluwaserimi Adewumi Ajetunmobi

Commissioner for Health of Oyo State
- Incumbent
- Assumed office 2023
- Governor: Seyi Makinde
- Preceded by: Gbolahan Adeniran

Personal details
- Education: University of Ibadan
- Occupation: Physician, politician

Oluwaserimi Adewumi Ajetunmobi is a Nigerian physician and politician. Since 2023, she has served as Commissioner for Health in Oyo State.

== Education ==
Ajetunmobi studied medicine at the University of Ibadan, where she qualified as a physician. She later obtained a master's degree.

== Career ==
Ajetunmobi's medical career has included work in public health and family medicine. She worked at the United Nations Development Programme (UNDP)‑affiliated teaching hospital in Ido‑Ekiti, Ekiti State. She has also held positions as Consultant Family Physician at Afe Babalola University, Ado‑Ekiti, and at the Federal Teaching Hospital, Ido Ekiti. She has contributed to healthcare initiatives with emphasis on maternal and child health, health financing, and emergency response systems.

=== Political career ===
In 2023, Governor Seyi Makinde nominated her for a commissioner role. Following confirmation, she was appointed Commissioner for Health in Oyo State.

== Membership ==
Ajetunmobi is a Fellow of the West African College of Physicians (FWACP).
