= Peter Onumanyi =

Nigerian mathematician

Peter Onumanyi is a Nigerian mathematician. He was born in 1951 in Okene, Nigeria. A graduate of the University of Ibadan and Imperial College, London, he is a fellow and past president of the Mathematical Association of Nigeria. He has been the head of the Mathematics department, dean of the Faculty of Natural Sciences, and deputy vice-chancellor (academic) of the University of Jos.

== Early life and education ==
He was born in 1951 in Okene town of Kogi State of Nigeria. He attended the RCM primary school, Okene-South and had his secondary education at Government Secondary School, Dekina, from where he obtained a division-one in the 1968 West African School Certificate Examination.

He proceeded to Titcombe College, Egbe, Kogi State for the Higher School Certificate course in 1969. Onumanyi later attended the University of Ibadan, where he graduated in mathematics in 1975 with the B.Sc. Hons. degree. Thereafter, he obtained the M.Sc. and PhD (numerical analysis) degrees from the Imperial College of Science and Technology, University of London in 1979 and 1981, respectively. He obtained his M.Sc. degree with “a mark of distinction” at the Imperial College, London.

== Academic career and PhD supervision ==
Onumanyi has taught and carried out research in mathematics at the department of Mathematics, University of Ilorin, Ilorin, Kwara State of Nigeria (1982–1992), University of Jos, Jos, Plateau State of Nigeria (1992–2004). He has supervised eight students that have obtained PhD degree in numerical analysis and over twenty-five for the M.Sc. degree in numerical analysis. The University of Jos appointed a senior lecturer in 1992 and a professor of mathematics in 1993 and he is still very active in research and paper writing. He has forty scientific publications in Journals across Africa, Europe, Japan and US.

== Scholarly journal and professional assessment work ==
Onumanyi has assessed many of his academic colleagues’ papers for professorship appointments. He has served and still serving as external examiner to many Nigerian Universities and Polytechnics. He has served in many editorial boards of academic journals and mathematical abstracts reviews both in Nigeria and overseas. They include:

- Mathematical Abstracts reviewers for Zentrablatt for Mathematic, West Germany (1983–1993),
- Editor-in-chief of Abacus, Journal of Mathematical Association of Nigeria (MAN) (1989–1994),
- Member, Editorial board of Abacus (1994–2004).

== Convocational service ==
Onumanyi has served on many important committees as chairman or member within and outside the University Communities of University of Jos and University of Ilorin. He has served as the national president of the Mathematical Association of Nigeria (MAN) (1998–2000). He is a life member of the association and awarded the highest honour of the association, Fellow of MAN (FMAN) in 2001. He has held the following positions in the University of Jos:

- Head of Department of Mathematics (1993–1995)
- Dean, Faculty of Natural Sciences (1995–1998),
- Chairman, Committee of Deans (1997–1998), elected representative of the congregation to the University Governing Council (1997–2000)
- Deputy Vice-chancellor (academic) (1998–2000).

== Personal life ==
Onumanyi is married and has six children.

== Selected publications ==
- P. Onumanyi, E. L. Ortiz and H. Samara (1981), Software for a method of finite approximations for the numerical solution of differential equations. Applied Mathematical Modelling, vol. 5, pp. 282 – 286. Published in the United Kingdom by IPC Science and Technology press.
- P. Onumanyi and E. L. Ortiz (1982), Numerical Solution of high order Boundary value problems for ordinary different equations with an estimation of the error. Numerical Methods in Engineering, Vol. 18, 775-781. Published in Great Britain by John Wiley & sons Ltd.
- P. Onumanyi and E. L. Ortiz (1984), Numerical solution of stiff and singularly perturbed boundary value problems with a segmented adaptive formulation of the Tau method. Mathematics of Computation, Vol. 43, pp. 189-203. Published in USA by the American Mathematical society.
- S. A. Okunuga and P. Onumanyi (1985). An accurate collocation method for ordinary differential equation. Advances in Modelling and Simulation, Vol.4, pp. 45-58. Published in France by the AMSE Press.
- M. O. Afolabi, M. A. Ibiejugba and P. Onumanyi (1986). Numerical Experiments with non-linear differential equations and application to optimal control. The Nigerian Journal of Pure and Applied Sciences, Vol. 1, pp. 26-38. Published by Faculty of Science, University of Ilorin Press, Ilorin, Nigeria.
- P. Onumanyi (1988). A collocation method for elliptic partial differential equations. Advances in Modelling and Simulation Review, vol. 6, pp. 35-41 published in France by AMSE Press.
- R. B. Adeniyi, P. Onumanyi and O. A. Taiwo (1990). A computational error estimate of the Tau method for nonlinear ordinary differential equations. Journal of Nigeria Mathematical Society, vol. 9, pp. 21-32. Published by the Nigerian Mathematical Society, Nigeria.
- 'P. Onumanyi, U. W. Sirisena and S. N. Jator (1993). Continuous Adams-Moulton Methods for a direct Solution of Nonstiff Boundary Value problems, Nigerian Journal of Mathematics and Applications, vol. 6pp. 75 – 84.
- U. W. Sirisena, P. Onumanyi and D. O Awoyemi (1996). A new family of Predictor – corrector methods. Spectrum Journal, vol. 3, Nos. 1 & 2, pp. 140-147. Published by the Kaduna Polytechnic, Nigerian.
- P. Onumanyi, U. W. Sirisena and S. N. Jator (1999). Continuous Finite difference Approximations for solving Differential Equations. Computer Mathematics, vol. 72, No. 1, pp. 15-27. Published in Great Britain by John Wiley & Sons Ltd.
- P. Onumanyi, U. W. Sirisena, and S. N. Jator, (2002). A better approach for solving some Odes problems by linear mutistep method. Science Forum, Pure and Applied Science, vol. 5 No. 2, pp. 273 – 291.
- P. Onumanyi, J. Fatokun and B.O. Adejo (2008). Accurate numerical differentiation by continuous integrators for ordinary differential equations. Journal of the Nigerian Mathematical Society, Vol. 27, pp. 69 -90.
- Samson Olatunji Ale, Peter Onumanyi and Oyelami Benjamin Oyelami (2008). The Proceedings of NMC-COMSATS International Conference on Mathematical Modelling of some Global Challenging Problems in The 21st Century, (26 – 30 Nov. 2008). National Mathematical Centre Abuja, Nigeria, ISBN 978-8141-11-0.
