= Ayo Rock Formations =

Monolithic rock boulders on the island of Aruba

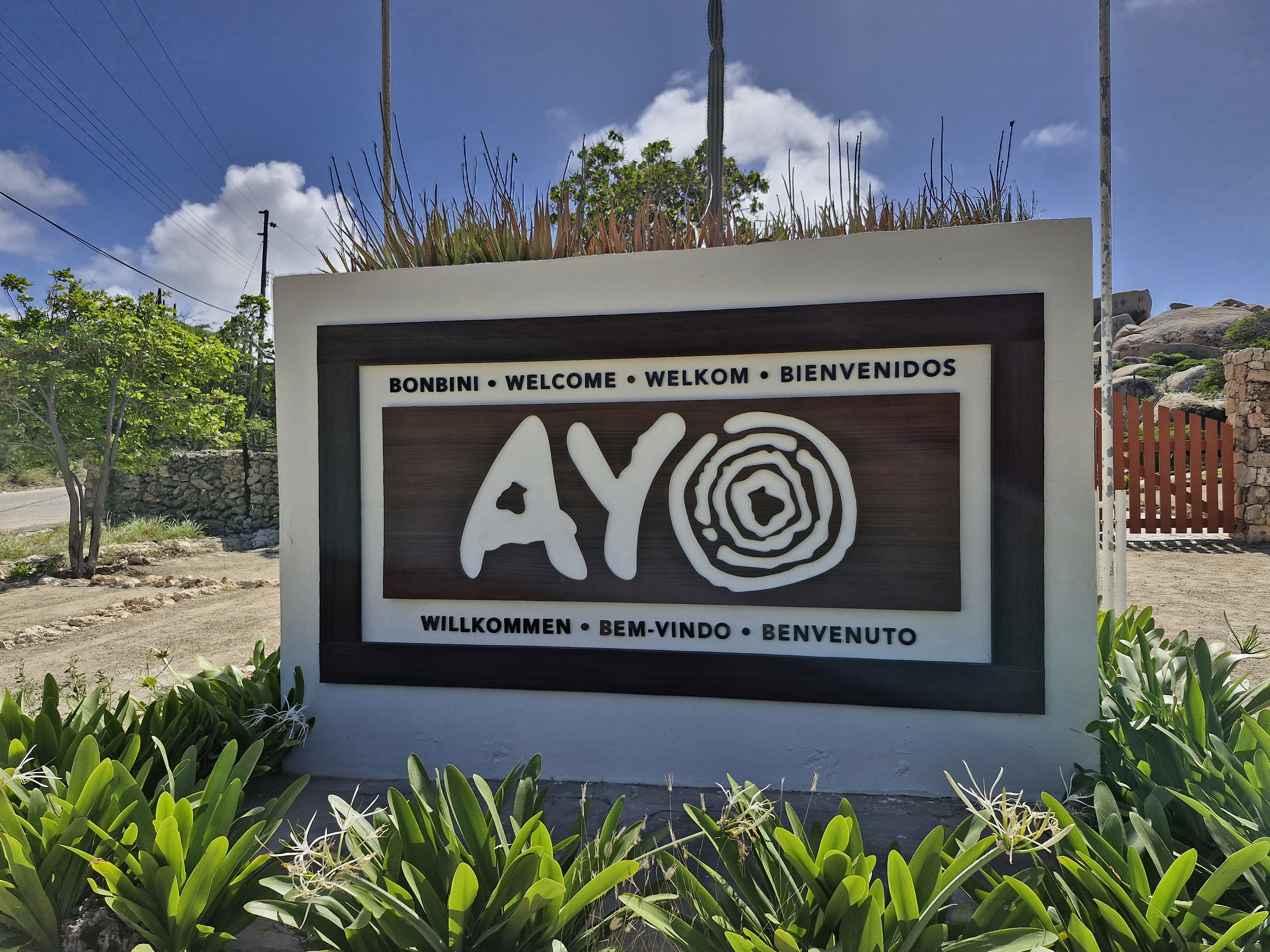
Logo and entre, Ayo Rock Formations

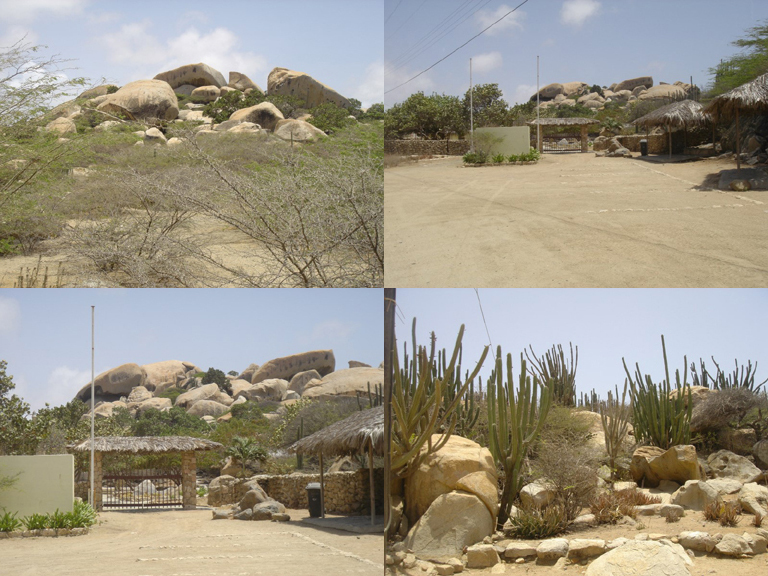
Logo and entre Ayo Rock Formations

Ayo Rock Formations are monolithic rock boulders located on the island of Aruba in the Caribbean, near Ayo village and about 3.2 km (2.0 mi) from the defunct natural bridge towards Casibari. Similarly, the Casibari Boulders are about 3.2 km (2.0 mi) inland between Natural Bridge and Oranjestad, the capital of Aruba, to the west of Boca Andicuri.

== History ==
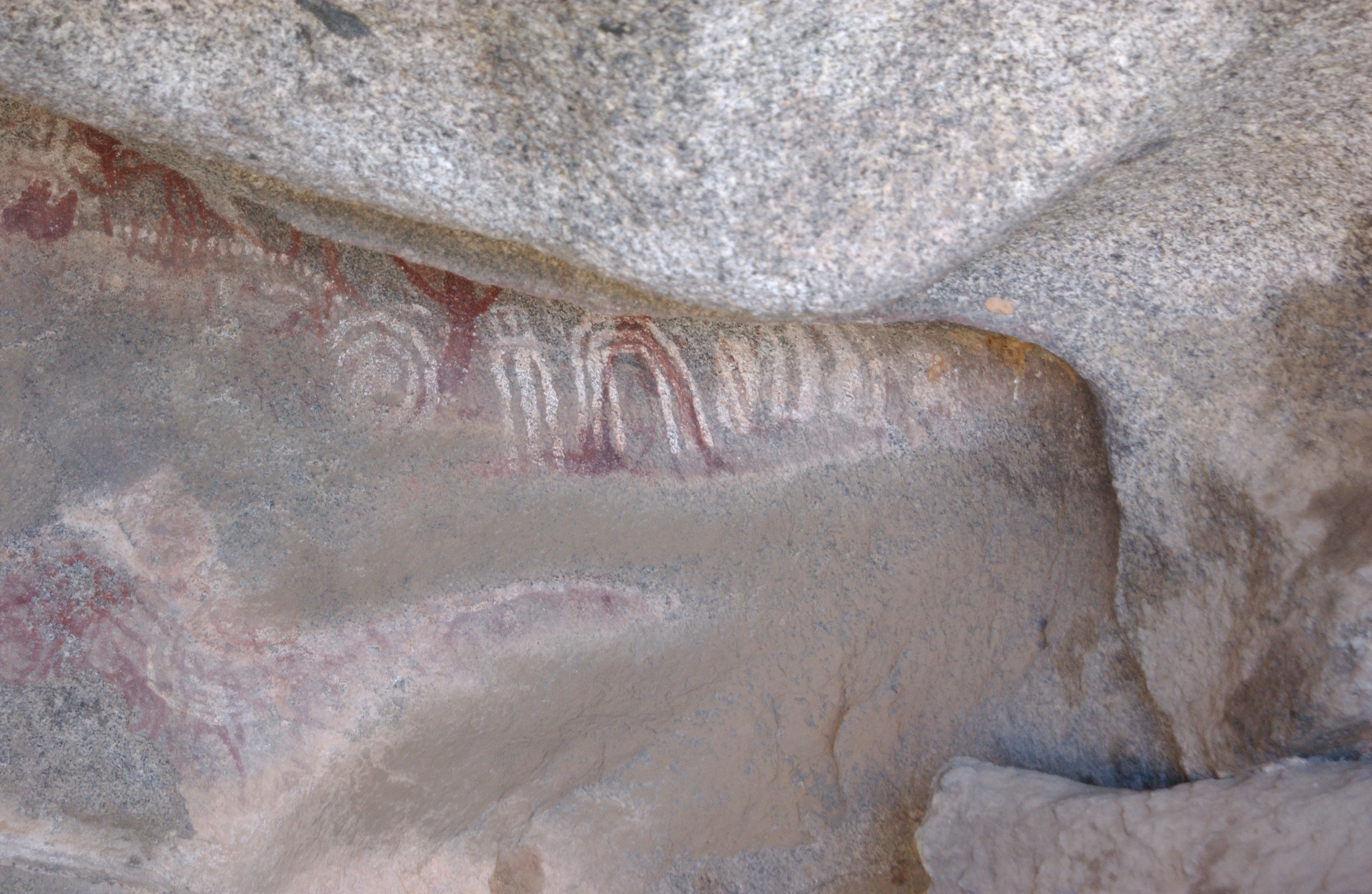
Arawak petroglyphs in the Ayo Rocks

The Arawak people were the earliest settlers on the island. They used to visit Ayo Rock Formations so that they could hear incoming thunderstorms closing in on the island of Aruba. They also carved paintings in rocks called petroglyphs while performing religious rites.

== Formations ==
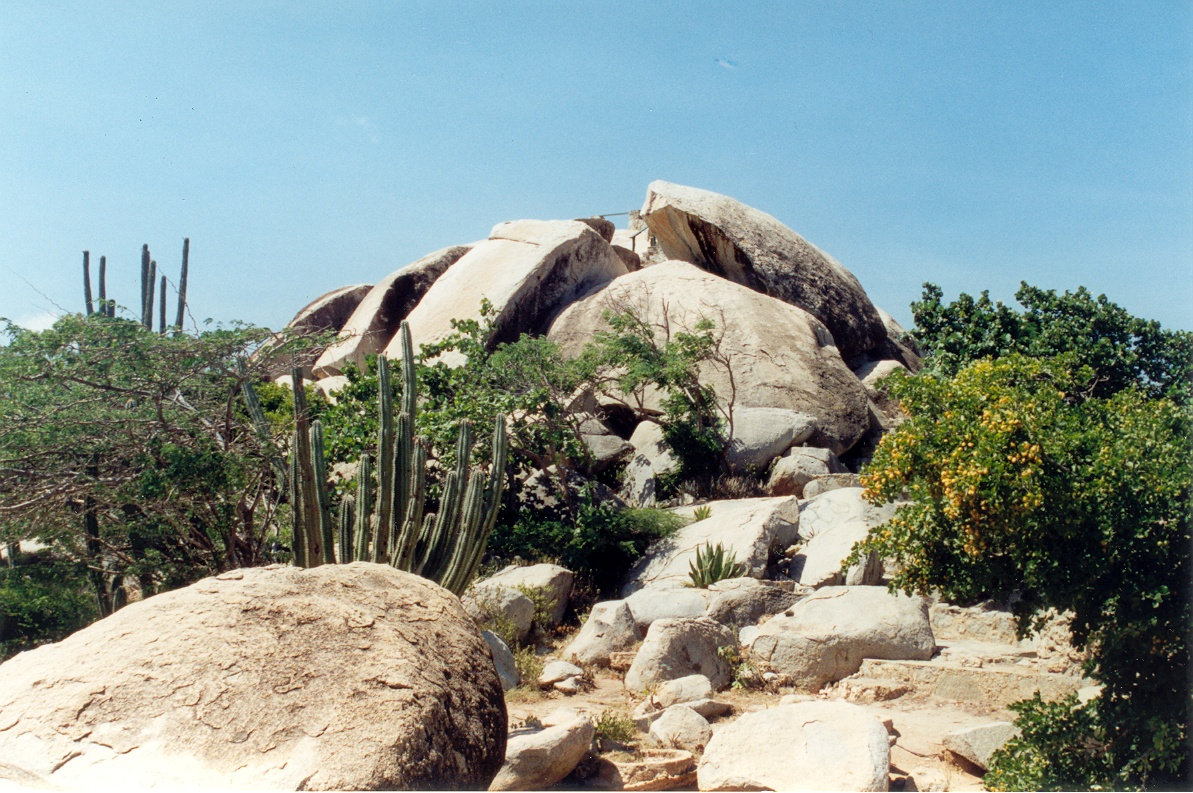
Rock formations near Ayo village

One of the most unusual and notable rock formations on the island are the Casibari Boulders, which are tonalite rocks seen to the north of Hooiberg. They rise above the desert landscape giving a panoramic view of the island. They are located amidst cacti, and lizards are commonly encountered here. The boulders have unusual shapes resembling birds and dragons. There is no plausible explanation yet for the presence of these unusual wind-carved boulder formations on a flat sandy island. However, the geological formations seen on the island are of volcanic origin in its eastern sector, and some areas which are of coral formation are ascribed to the sea which was at higher level. However, in the diorite rock formation region, the Ayo Rock Formations are seen in a heap of monolithic boulders.

== Walking trails ==
Walking trails and steps have been set around the formation. They pass through several narrow tunnel which make the access through a single line quite difficult. Casibari formations are approached 3.2 km from the Highway 4A/B. At the entrance, there is a formation named Dragon Mouth. On a clear day, the entire island and even Venezuela coast line can be seen from the formations site.

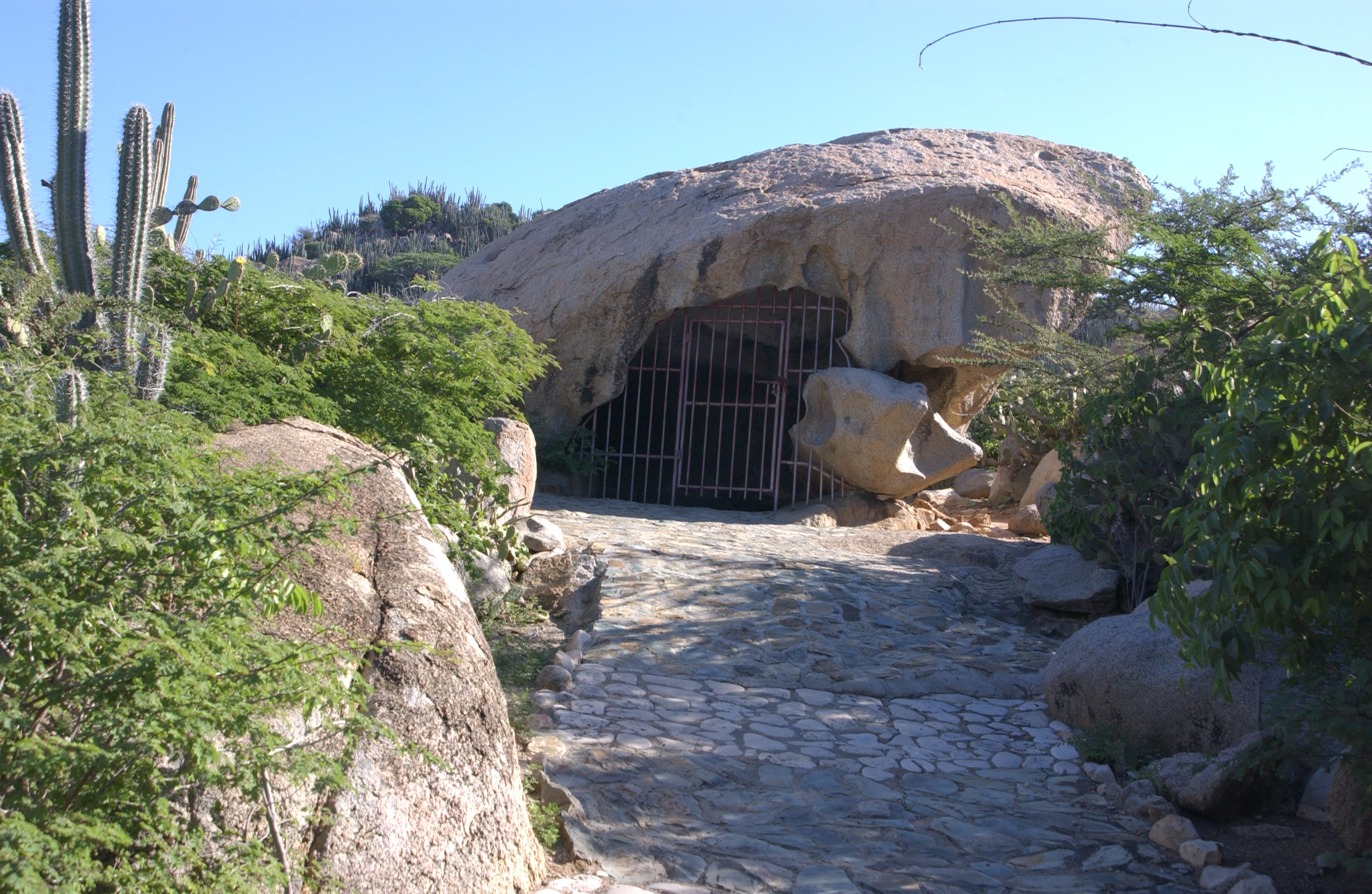
Another rock formation
