= Auchi Polytechnic =

Polytechnic in Auchi, Edo State, Nigeria

- Auchi Polytechnic official Logo
- Other name: AuchiPoly
- Motto: Hands & Brain for Development
- Type: Public
- Established: 1963
- Rector: Dr. S. S. Umar
- Location: Auchi, Edo State, Nigeria; 7.08175°N 6.27817°E
- Campus: Campus1, campus 2, campus 3; Auchi
- Colors: Yellow, red, green
- Website: www.auchipoly.edu.ng

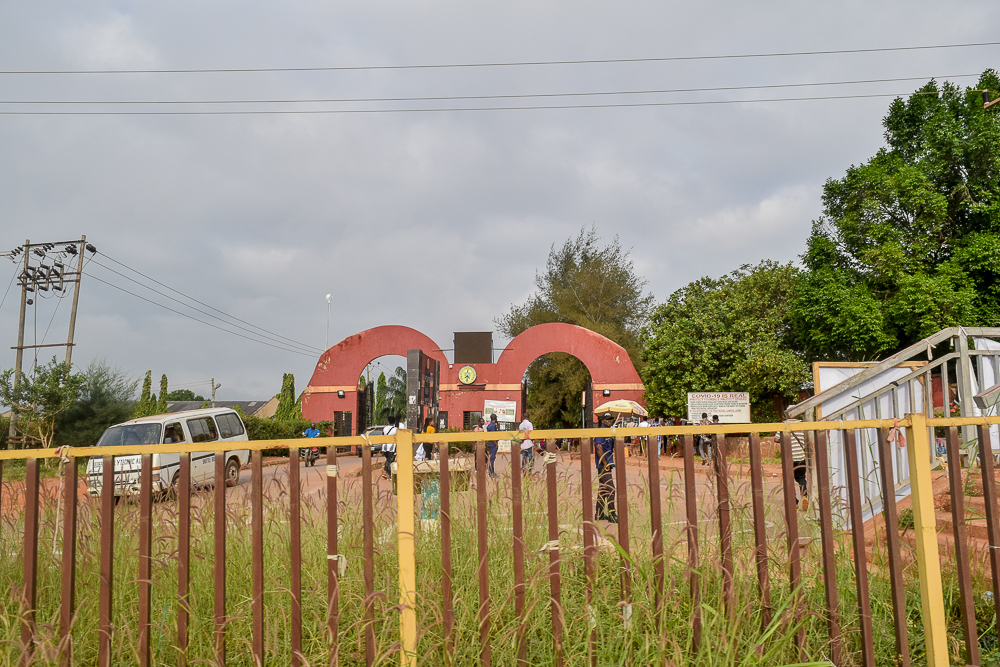
Auchi Polytechnic gate, Auchi, Edo state 6

Auchi Polytechnic is a Federal Polytechnic in Auchi, Edo State, Nigeria. It is one of the first four Polytechnics established in Nigeria and has 9050 students as of 2021. It is located along Benin – Okene Road, Auchi, Edo State, Nigeria.

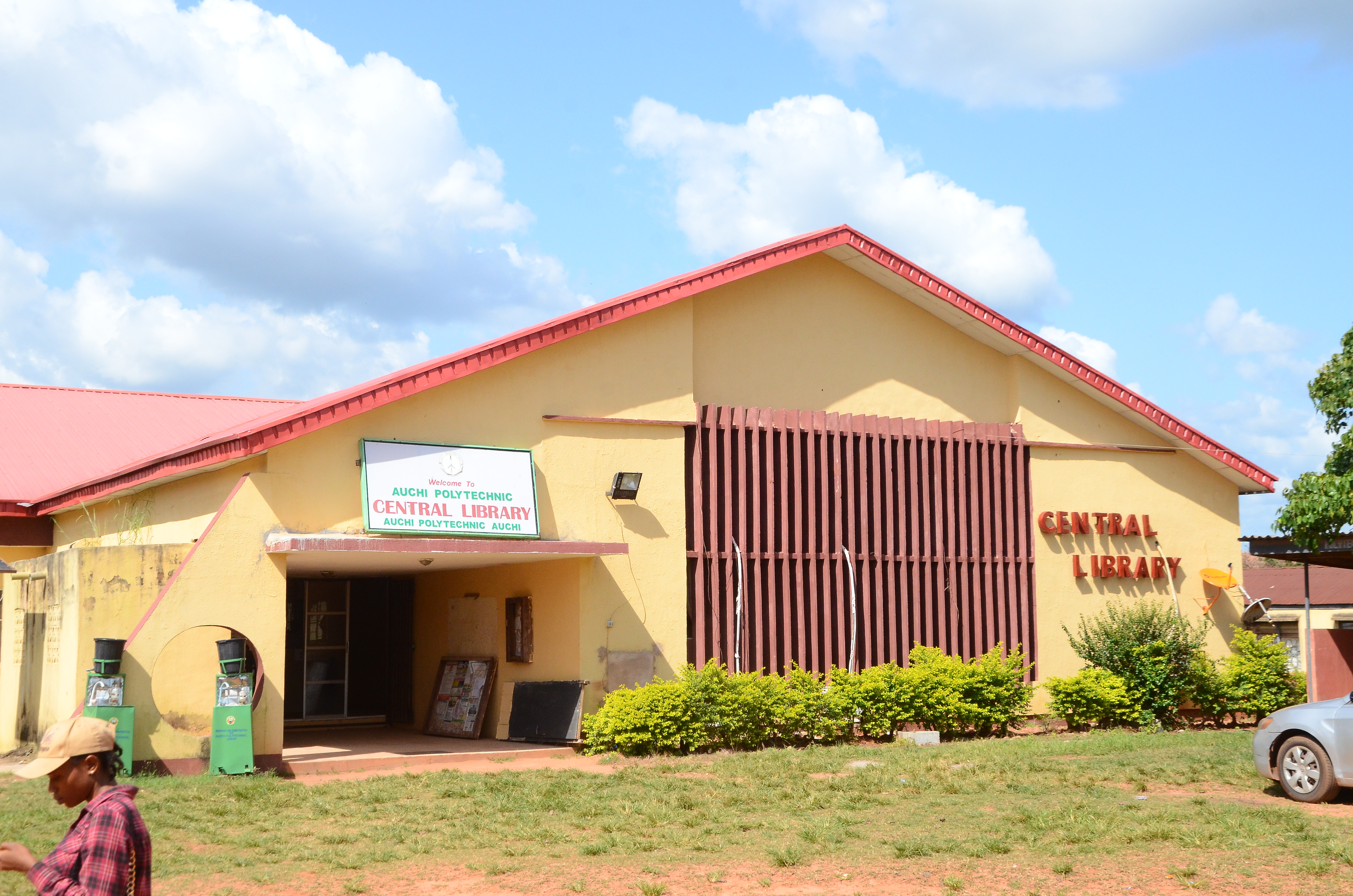
Auchi Polytechnic Central Library

== History ==
Auchi Polytechnic was founded in 1963, first as a technical college which was a gift of the British government to the then Midwestern Region. It offered courses only up to the Ordinary Diploma level in limited areas of engineering and business. By the seventies, there was a need for skilled manpower at a higher level and in many more disciplines. Thus in 1973, the Bendel State Government upgraded the technical college to a full-fledged polytechnic with the mandate to train skilled manpower up to the Higher National Diploma level in a broad range of engineering, science, environmental studies, business studies and art and design.

The extant law establishing it assigned to the institution the task of producing well trained and highly skilled middle level manpower for the national economy in the areas of engineering, applied sciences and technology, environmental studies, management studies, and art and industrial design. In 1994, the Federal Government took over the polytechnic from the Edo State Government.

== Library ==
The polytechnic library is stock with information resources in books format and online resources, which are located in two campuses to support the learning process in the institutions. The library is managed by the polytechnic librarian.

== Notable alumni ==
- Hanks Anuku, Nigerian-Ghanaian actor.
- Philipa Idogho, former Rector
- Tom Ikimi, politician.
- Paul Obazele, Nigerian actor
- Ijeoma Otabor, known as Phyna, entertainer and winner of Big Brother Naija season 7
- Shallipopi, rapper and songwriter.
- Victor AD, Nigerian singer and songwriter
