= Oni Idigbe =

Nigerian doctor (born 1947)

Prof. Oni Idigbe
- Born: Oni Emmanuel Idigbe; April 20, 1947 (age 78); Yaba, Lagos, Nigeria
- Education: University of Glasgow (PhD)
- Occupations: Medical practitioner, microbiologist
- Years active: 1999–present
- Partner: Married
- Medical career
- Profession: Director General of the Nigerian Institute of Medical Research
- Field: Diseases and control
- Research: Tuberculosis, HIV

Oni Emmanuel Idigbe (born 20 April 1947) is a Nigerian doctor, microbiologist and academic professor who served as the Director General of the Nigerian Institute of Medical Research (NIMR). He held the post subsequently in 2000 after acting in that capacity from 1999. He is widely known for his contributions to the field of diseases and Control, especially tuberculosis and HIV. Idigbe has published over 65 scientific papers in both Local and international peer review journal in this subject area. He bagged his PhD from the University of Glasgow.

A native of Delta State, Nigeria. He works as an Adjunct Professor of Microbiology at the Feinberg School of Medicine and Northwestern University, Chicago, USA.

== Early life and background ==
Idigbe had his BSc in Microbiology from the University of Nigeria, Nsukka in 1974 and PhD in Medical Microbiology from University of Glasgow, Scotland in 1979. He became a research fellow of the Nigerian Institute of Medical Research in 1980 and subsequently 1982.

=== Teaching and lecturing ===
From 1986 till 1989, he was an associate senior lecturer of the Department of Microbiology at the University of Lagos.

== Publications ==
- Chima Ohuabunwo; Oni Idigbe (2016). "Clinical Profile and Containment of the Ebola Virus Disease Outbreak in Two Large West African Cities, Nigeria, July-September 2014". Epidemiology. 53 (13). doi:10.1016/j.ijid.2016.08.011. ISSN 1878-3511. PMC 7129421.
