= Lagos State University Teaching Hospital =

Hospital in Ikeja, Lagos State, Nigeria

Geography
- Location: Ikeja, Lagos State, Nigeria
- Coordinates: 6.590608°N 3.342225°E

Organisation
- Type: Teaching
- Affiliated university: Lagos State University

Services
- Emergency department: Yes
- Specialty: Research, General hospital Family Medicine Pediatric Medicine, Pediatric Surgery, Obstetrics, Gynecology, General Surgery, Heart Surgery, Urology, Neurosurgery, Cardiothoracic Surgery, Orthopedics, Maxillofacial Surgery, ENT, Ophthalmology, Plastic Surgery, Cardiology, Endocrinology, Rheumatology, Dermatology, Neurology, Nephrology, Gastroenterology, Respiratory Medicine, Pathology, Radiology, Fertility Medicine,

History
- Opened: 1955

Links
- Website: www.lasuth.org.ng
- Lists: Hospitals in Nigeria

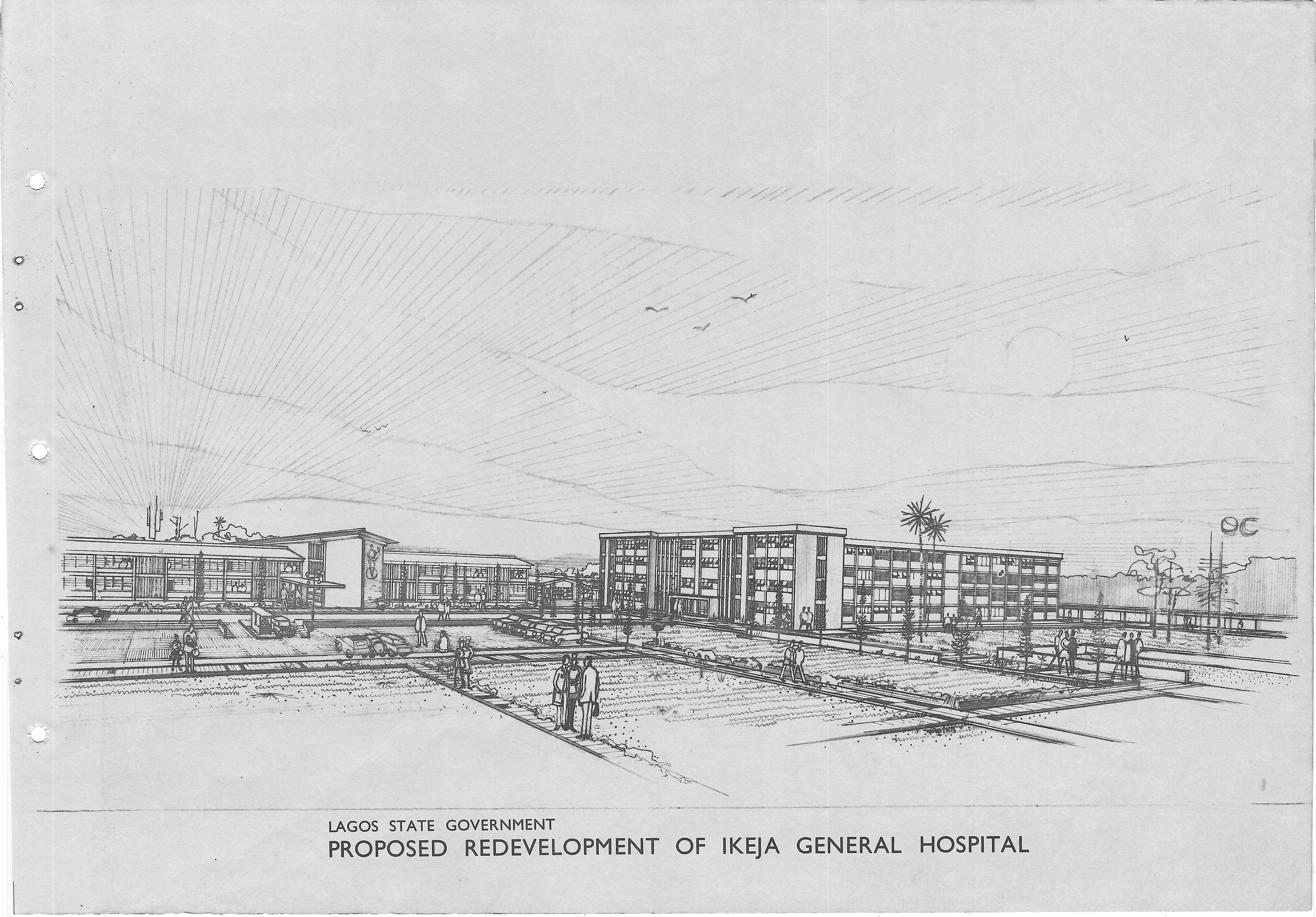
Ikeja General Hospital Nigeria 1972 Designed by Michael Olutusen Onafowokan Lagos State Govt 022.jpg

Lagos State University Teaching Hospital popularly known as LASUTH is a state-owned teaching hospital in Lagos, Nigeria, attached to the Lagos State University. It is in Ikeja – the state's capital.

LASUTH also shares structures with the College of Medicine, Lagos State University. The hospital was established in 1955 from a small cottage health centre by the Old western region. The hospital was later redesigned entirely post independence by Onafowokan Michael Olutusen in the year 1972, it was named Ikeja general hospital. It was converted to a teaching hospital in July 2001.

Lagos State University Teaching Hospital (LASUTH) now has a centre for advanced neonatal studies.

== Departments ==
Department of Medicine, Department Of Nursing Services, Department Of Ear, Nose And Throat, Department of Family Medicine, Department Of Haematology And Blood Transfusion, Department Of Medical Microbiology, Department Of Child Dental Health, Department of Accident and Emergency, Department Of Community Health & Primary Care, Department Of Clinical Pathology, Department Of Anaesthesia, Department Of Anatomic And Molecular Pathology.

== Schools ==
School of Community Health, Anaesthetic Technicians, Federal School of Biomedical Engineering, School of Health Information Management, School Of Nursing, School Of Post Basic Nursing, School of Medical and Psychiatry Social Work, School Of Midwifery

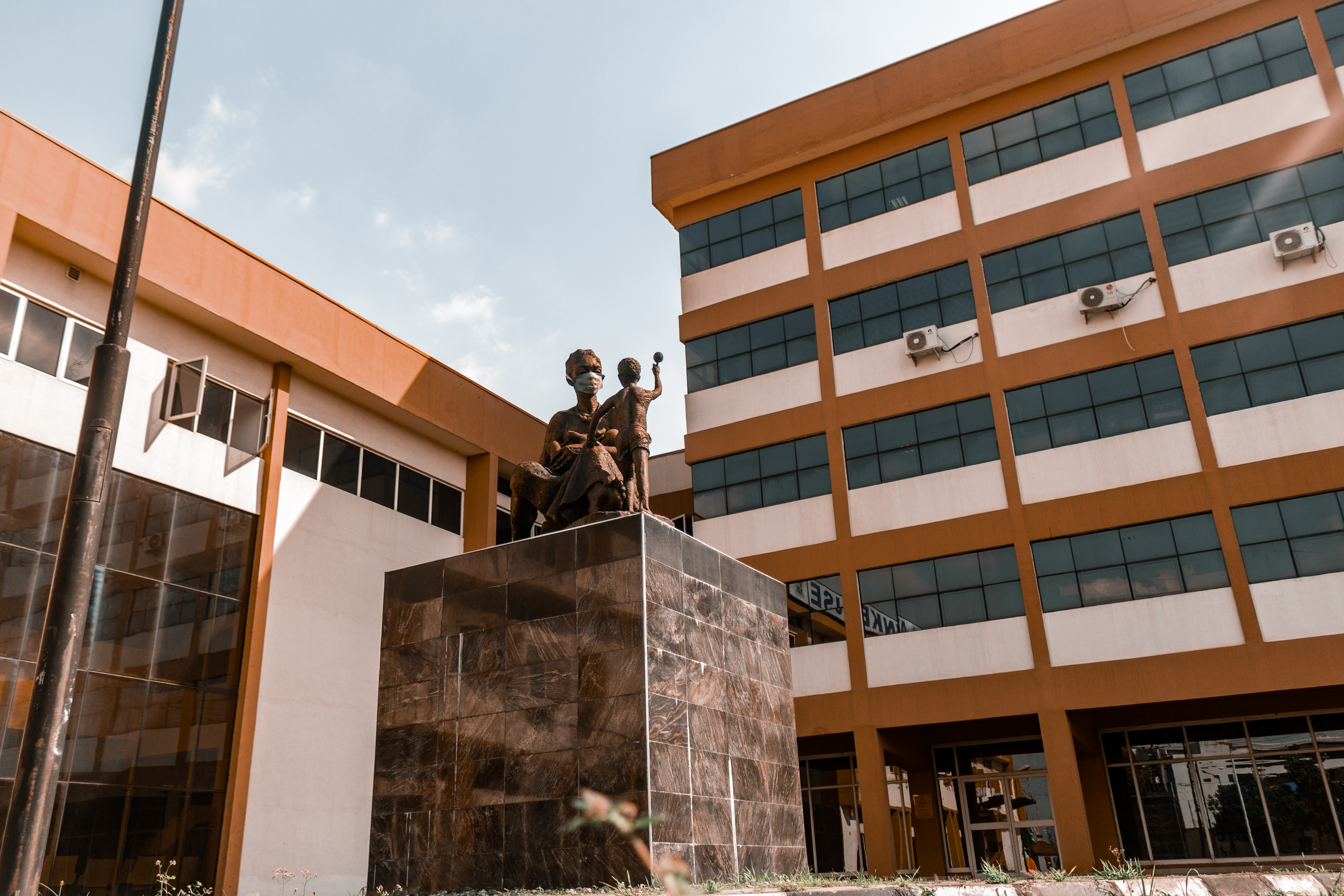
Maternity Ward

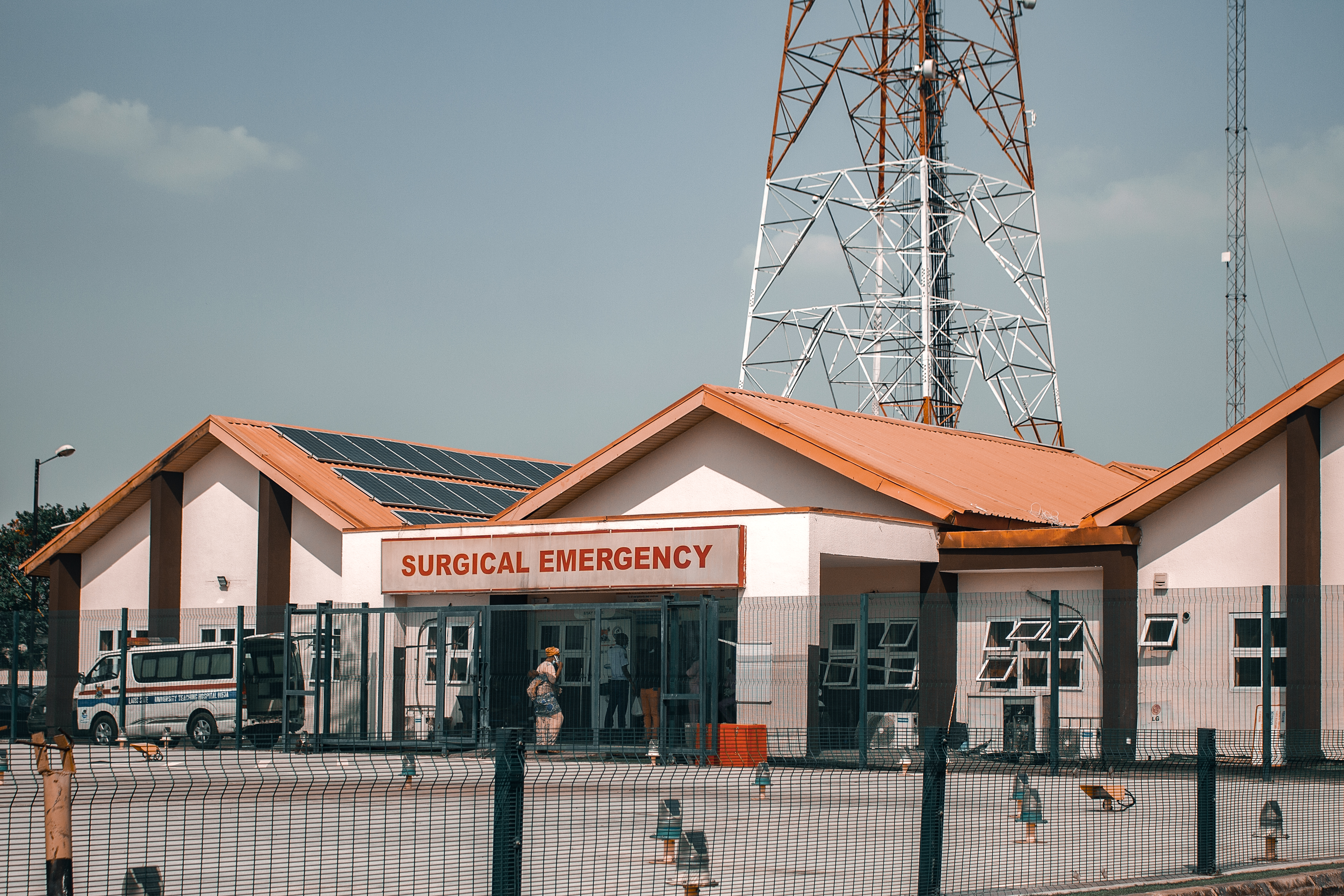
Surgical Emergency

== Achievements ==
On 12 November 2015 the first successful kidney transplant was performed in the hospital.
