= Rose Osuji =

Nigerian physicist

Rose Uzoma Osuji
- Born: 1947 (age 78–79); Nigeria
- Education: University of Nigeria
- Known for: Nanotechnology research, solar energy studies
- Awards: Fellow of the African Academy of Sciences (2022)
- Scientific career
- Fields: Physics, Nanotechnology, Materials Science, Solar Energy
- Workplaces: University of Nigeria, Nsukka

Rose Uzoma Osuji (born 1947) is a Nigerian physicist. She is professor of physics at the University of Nigeria, where she founded the nanotechnology research group. Her research interests include solar energy and materials science.

== Life ==
Osuji served as head of the university's department of physics and astronomy from 2006 to 2008 and again from 2012 to 2015.

In 2018 Osuji announced that the University of Nigeria would be partnering with the oil service company Oilserv to set up an African Centre for Nanosciences and Nanotechnology Research and Application.

In 2022 Osuji was inducted as a Fellow of the African Academy of Sciences.
