= Society for Family Health Nigeria =

Non-governmental organization

The Society for Family Health (SFH) is a pan-African non governmental organisation (NGO), founded in 1983 and incorporated in 1985.

The organisation was founded by three eminent Nigerians, Professor Olikoye Ransome-Kuti, Mallam Dahiru Wali, and Hon. Justice Ifeyinwa Nzeako.

Society for Family Health (SFH) is a leading Nigerian non-governmental organization that implements public health interventions across several key areas. Its programme focus includes malaria prevention and treatment—promoting the use of rapid diagnostic tests and microscopy, HIV and tuberculosis (TB) prevention and treatment (including prevention of mother-to-child transmission), adolescent and youth health programming, reproductive health and family planning (RH/FP), health policy and financing, pharmaceutical systems strengthening, and health research and information systems.

In addition, SFH implements initiatives on cervical cancer screening and prevention, and promotes access to safe water through improved water, sanitation, and hygiene (WASH) practices. The organization integrates evidence-based strategies and social behavior change approaches to drive sustainable health outcomes in Nigeria and across the West African subregion.

To further expand its reach and ensure equitable access to health commodities, SFH established a subsidiary, SFH Access to Health LTD/GTE. This entity focuses on increasing sustainable access to RMNCH-N and non-communicable disease products across Nigeria. Leveraging a blended financing model—including out-of-pocket payments, donor funding, loans, and innovation grants—it supports long-term affordability. Profits from premium brands are reinvested to subsidize lower-cost alternatives for underserved populations, reinforcing SFH's commitment to nationwide health equity.

== History ==
SFH is a pan- African non-governmental organisation founded in 1983 by Honourable Justice Ifeyinwa Nzeako, Prof. Olikoye Ransome-Kuti, and Pharm (Mallam) Dahiru Wali. SFH began as a Population Services International (PSI) affiliate with one HIV grant and reproductive health products for distribution in Nigeria.

In 1985, SFH was incorporated as a Nigerian non-governmental organisation and in 1994 released the Who Get This Rain Coat Gold Circle Condom/Family Planning campaign on national television. In the late 1980s, it went into partnerships with pharmaceutical companies to distribute Gold Circle condoms in Lagos, Oyo, and Ogun States, in South Western Nigeria. It soon scaled up its operations, expanding nationwide, and commencing the marketing of oral contraceptives, in partnership with USAID. A partnership with the then UK's Department for International Development (DFID) (now the Foreign, Commonwealth and Development Office) followed which also focused on the marketing of condoms, oral and injectable contraceptives, and a water-based lubricant.

By 1997, SFH was distributing seventeen million condoms annually, and by 2009, 200 million condoms all over Nigeria at a subsidised price. In 2003, SFH launched its malaria programme, in partnership with USAID USAID. The focus was on the treatment and prevention of malaria - one of the biggest causes of infant and child mortality in Nigeria. The malaria programme has grown significantly, with funding and support from The Global Fund to Fight AIDS, Tuberculosis and Malaria. Currently, the focus is on the use of Artemisinin-based Combination Therapies (ACT) and conducting Rapid Diagnostic Test for malaria before treatment as well as encouraging proper use of Long-Lasting Insecticidal Nets.

In 2005, SFH became the first Nigerian organisation to receive direct funding from the United States Agency for International Development (USAID) to implement programmes in reproductive health. SFH is operating in five West African Countries - Liberia, Ghana, Sierra Leone, Côte d'Ivoire and Nigeria. SFH has 20 regional offices, and 26 active projects present across all 36 states in Nigeria including the Federal Capital Territory where the organisation is headquartered.

The Society for Family Health ensures healthy pregnancies, safe deliveries, child spacing, and emergency interventions for women at risk. The organisation receives its funding support from a number of national and international donors. Among these are: The World Bank, USAID, Bill & Melinda Gates Foundation, The Children's Investment Fund Foundation, Lagos state governor Sanwo-Olu inaugurates SFH's innovation hub in Lagos MSD for Mothers, the United States International Development Agency, Stop TB partnership, the Foreign, Commonwealth and Development Office, Oxfam Novib, United Nations Population Fund, and The Global Fund to Fight AIDS, Tuberculosis and Malaria.

== Board of Trustees ==
SFH Nigeria's board of trustees are as follows;

- Prof. Ekanem Ikpi Braide - President, Board of Trustees, Society for Family Health, Nigeria
- Pharm. Ahmed I. Yakasai - Former president, Pharmaceutical Society of Nigeria
- Dr Chikwe Ihekweazu - Assistant Director-General for Health Emergency Intelligence, World Health Organisation
- Professor Joy Ngozi Ezeilo - Founder of WACOL
- Sir Bright Ekweremadu - Country Director, CBM International
- Abdulrazak Ibrahim
- Kim Schwartz- Senior Vice President and Chief Financial Officer, Population Services International (PSI)
- Dr Goodluck Obi, FCA- Partner & Head, Consumer and Industrial Markets at KPMG
- Abasi Ene-Obong, PhD - Founder and CEO of 54gene

== Operations and locations ==
The Society for Family Health (SFH) operates in five West African countries: Sierra Leone, Ghana, Liberia, Côte d'Ivoire and Nigeria. In Nigeria, SFH has 20 regional offices and 26 active projects are present across all 36 states in Nigeria including the FCT- Abuja where the organisation is headquartered.

The Society for Family Health works in six thematic areas affecting family health in Nigeria. The thematic areas are: Safe Water Systems in Nigeria, Family Planning and Reproductive Health, Maternal and Child Healthcare, HIV/AIDS Prevention and Treatment, Malaria Prevention and Treatment, & Health and Social Systems Strengthening.

SFH Nigeria's public health interventions in these thematic areas are implemented through different projects across several states across Nigeria. SFH creates demand for life-saving health commodities through social marketing. The commodities are stored at a 7,400 square meters SFH Warehouse in Ota, Ogun State. and are also packaged, and distributed all over West Africa. The organisation has a condom testing lab where male condoms are tested prior to packaging and distribution.

== Publications ==
- Baruwa, Sikiru; Tobey, Elizabeth; Okafor, Emeka; Afolabi, Kayode; Akomolafe, Toyin O.; Ubuane, Innocent; Anyanti, Jennifer; Jain, Aparna (2022). "The role of job aids in supporting task sharing family planning services to community pharmacists and patent proprietary medicine vendors in Kaduna and Lagos, Nigeria". BMC Health Services Research. 22 (1): 981. doi:10.1186/s12913-022-08360-0. PMC 9340708. PMID 35915491.
- Brunie, A.; Rademacher, K. H.; Nwala, A. A.; Danna, K.; Saleh, M.; Afolabi, K. (2020). "Provision of the levonorgestrel intrauterine system in Nigeria: Provider perspectives and service delivery costs". Gates Open Research. 4: 119. doi:10.12688/gatesopenres.13135.1. PMC 7463110. PMID 32908965.
- Shobo, Olukolade George; Umar, Nasir; Gana, Ahmed; Longtoe, Peter; Idogho, Omokhudu; Anyanti, Jennifer (2020). "Factors influencing the early initiation of breast feeding in public primary healthcare facilities in Northeast Nigeria: A mixed-method study". BMJ Open. 10 (4) e032835. doi:10.1136/bmjopen-2019-032835. PMC 7204917. PMID 32317258.
- Anyanti, Jennifer; Akuiyibo, Selema Margaret; Fajemisin, Oluwole; Idogho, Omokhudu; Amoo, Babatunde (2021). "Assessment of the level of knowledge, awareness and management of hypertension and diabetes among adults in Imo and Kaduna states, Nigeria: A cross-sectional study". BMJ Open. 11 (3) e043951. doi:10.1136/bmjopen-2020-043951. PMC 7942260. PMID 34006029.
- Wada, Yusuf Hassan; Ogunyinka, Ibrahim Abayomi; Yusuff, Kazeem Babatunde; Ochu, Chinwe Lucia; Yahaya, Mohammed; Khalid, Garba Mohammed; Mutalub, Yahkub Babatunde; Adeniye, Sulaiman Badmus (2022). "Knowledge of Lassa fever, its prevention and control practices and their predictors among healthcare workers during an outbreak in Northern Nigeria: A multi-centre cross-sectional assessment". PLOS Neglected Tropical Diseases. 16 (3) e0010259. doi:10.1371/journal.pntd.0010259. PMC 9045733. PMID 35286303.
- Eluwa, George I.; Adebajo, Sylvia; Idogho, Omokhudu; Fajemisin, Oluwole; Anyanti, Jennifer; Ahonsi, Babatunde (2015). "Evaluating the Impact of Health System Strengthening on HIV and Sexual Risk Behaviors in Nigeria". Journal of Acquired Immune Deficiency Syndromes. 70 (1): 67–74. doi:10.1097/QAI.0000000000000701. PMID 26322668. S2CID 9793419.
