= Ayo Ogunsheye =

Nigerian academic and businessman

- Died: Nigeria
- Known for: Adult education
- Scientific career
- Fields: Education, economics
- Workplaces: Henry Stephens, University of Ibadan

Ayo Ogunsheye is a Nigerian academic, nationalism scholar and former Head of the Department of Extra Murals, University of Ibadan. In 1970 he was one of the major high-profile executive personnel brought into indigenous private enterprise which were historically family dominated at the executive level.

== Extra murals department ==
The extra murals department of the university of Ibadan was established in 1949 to focus on adult education in the nation. A reason given for its creation was to expand knowledge to non-Ibadan graduates so as not to create a dominant network of graduate elites. However, the prospect of independence led to increased enthusiasm for knowledge in various towns and cities. The department soon devoted resources and research into the issue of self-government. A number of nationalistic politicians attended courses or seminars offered by the department in the 1950s. Ayo Ogunsheye, as director was a vital element in the department which included noted scholar Ulli Beier.

=== Self government seminar ===
As an academic, Ayo Ogunsheye wrote often on the need to tilt education towards improving national consciousness and bringing the informal education sector into public consciousness. In 1959, when the clamor for independence was at it loudest, a conference was held at Ibadan to hash out impending independent issues. As chairman of the first of such seminar in the region, the international conference discussed 'representative government and Progress in West Africa'. Most of his views about self-government emphasized the need to ensure internal cohesion in order to improve the standard of living of citizens. Using the adage, a nation divided against itself cannot stand, he stressed the extradition of internal chaos by the use of an appropriate constitution, which would become a necessary factor for strengthening the country, However, like his views on education, a lot them dealt with nationalism and how to ensure dynamic progress for black Africa. He also emphasized major complementary cases for unity in West Africa and Nigeria. That Nigeria as a large and diverse nation will provide instances where regions can benefit from fair exchange of food and resources. The need to attract foreign capital will become closer to reality with the existence of a large country suitable for foreign investors. Most of his views shed light on the need to maximize the potential of a large nation in order to benefit from increased external visibility and internal financial base for extended social services.
