= Arinola Olasumbo Sanya =

Nigerian academic

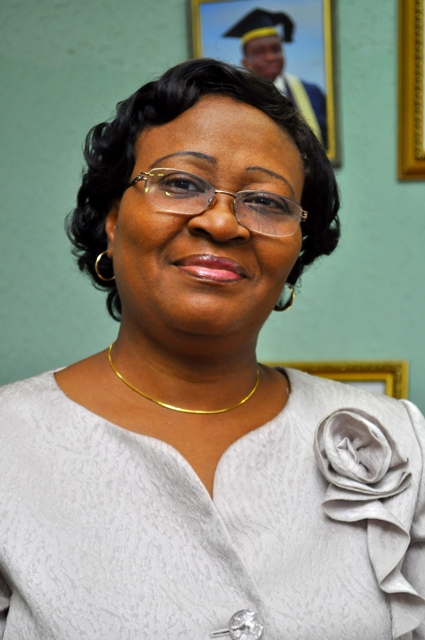
A portrait photo of Prof Arinola Olasunmbo Sanya taken in her office at the University of Ibadan in 2013

Arinola Olasumbo Sanya Arinola Olasumbo Sanya (born 1953) is a Nigerian professor of physiotherapy at the University of Ibadan and a former commissioner of health in Oyo State, Nigeria. She was appointed professor in 2000, making her the first female professor of physiotherapy in Africa, and the second ever professor of physiotherapy in Nigeria. She is among the Notable Oyo State indigenes.

She is the current Deputy Vice-Chancellor (Administration) at the University of Ibadan. She trained in physiotherapy at the University of Ibadan. She joined the Department of Physiotherapy at the University of Ibadan as a graduate assistant in 1978 where she remains as professor. Arinola is a Consultant Physiotherapist to the University College Hospital (UCH), Ibadan.. She sits on several management level committees at the University of Ibadan such as the Appointments and Promotions Committee.

== Public service ==
She was appointed commissioner for health in Oyo State (Nigeria) in 2005.

== Family ==
Professor Sanya is married to Dr. Yemi Sanya, a pharmacist and a business magnate in Lagos, Nigeria. They have four children.

== Publications ==
- Physical treatment of Buruli (Mycobacterial) ulceration in Nigeria: a case study report
- Risk factors for low back pain among hospital workers in Ibadan, Oyo State, Nigeria
