= Olaitan Soyannwo =

Nigerian professor of anaesthesia

- Citizenship: Nigerian
- Occupations: Anesthetist; Educationist; consultant

Olaitan Soyannwo is a Nigerian Professor of Anaesthesia and consultant at the University of Ibadan and foreign secretary of the Nigerian Academy of Science. She was formerly the President of International Association for the Study of Pain.
