= Lagos State University College of Medicine =

Medical school in Lagos, Nigeria

Lagos State University College of Medicine (LASUCOM)
- Type: Public
- Established: February 9, 1992
- Parent institution: Lagos State University
- Provost: Prof. Olufemi Idowu
- Undergraduates: 900
- Location: Ikeja, Lagos State, Nigeria
- Campus: Urban
- Website: www.lasucom.edu.ng

The College of Medicine of the Lagos State University popularly known as LASUCOM is one of the top College of Medicine in Nigeria.

The College is located within the structure of the Lagos State University Teaching Hospital, in Ikeja the Lagos State Capital.

It was established in 1999 under the administration of Col.Mohammed Buba Marwa who donated the building known as Ayinke House to the School.

The College started with training medical student that led to the award of Bachelor of Medicine, Bachelor of Surgery (MB;BS) Degree and expanded to other programmes such as Bachelor of Dental Surgery (BDS), Bachelor of Nursing Science (BN.Sc), Bachelor of Science, Physiology (B.Sc. Physiology), Bachelor of Science, Pharmacology (B.Sc. Pharmacology) and postgraduate programmes in Physiology, Anatomy, Medical Biochemistry and Public Health.

It currently has six faculties, Clinical sciences, Basic Medical Sciences, Basic Clinical Sciences, Dentistry, Pharmacy and Allied Health Sciences.

LASUCOM is also the fastest growing College of Medicine in Nigeria.

== Provosts ==
LASUCOM PROVOSTS
| NAME | TENURE |
|---|---|
| Prof. Wole Alakija | 1999-July 2004 |
| Prof. Aba Omotunde Sagoe | Aug 2003-Feb 2006 |
| Prof. John O. Obafunwa | March 2006-Feb 2010 |
| Prof. B.O. Osinusi | March 2010-Feb 2012 |
| Prof. Olumuyiwa O. Odusanya | March 2012-Feb 2014 |
| Prof. Gbadebo O. G. Awosanya | March 2014-Feb 2016 |
| Prof. Babatunde Solagberu | March 2016-October 2017 |
| Prof. Anthonia Ogbera | November 2017-December 2019 |
| Prof. Abiodun Adewuya | January 2020 - December 2021 |
| Prof. Mobolaji Adewale Oludara | January 2022 - October 2022 |
| Prof. Babatunde Solagberu | October 2022 - December 2022. |
| Prof. Abiodun Adewuya | January 2023 till December 2024 |
| Prof. Olufemi Idowu | December 2024 - till date |

== History ==
The Lagos State University College of Medicine (LASUCOM) is distinguished by its unique academic programmes such as medicine, dentistry, nursing, physiology, therapeutics and toxicology and postgraduate programmes. It is the only state university in Nigeria with an accredited dental programme.

The college was founded in February 1999 when it was commissioned by the Lagos State Government. The history of the college can be traced back to March 1987, when the foundation Vice Chancellor of Lagos State University, Prof. Afolabi Olumide, set up an advisory board in an attempt to establish the Lagos State University College of Medicine, based on the recommendation of the Tertiary Education Review Committee. Although the advisory board submitted its report in 1987, the problems faced by the University at the time delayed the establishment of the College of Medicine.

The University went through hard periods during the successive administrations headed at different times by Prof. Jadesola Akande and Prof, Enitan Bababunmi as Vice-Chancellors. Consequently, the attempt to establish a College of Medicine could not materialize because the University was grossly underfunded. When Prof. Fatiu Akosede (now deceased) assumed office in February 1997 as the fourth Vice Chancellor of Lagos State University, he sought the support of the then Lagos State Military Administrator, Col. Muhammed Buba Marwa in a second attempt towards the establishment of Lagos State University College of Medicine (LASUCOM) in July 1997. The advisory committee submitted its report to the military administrator, Col. Muhammed Buba Marwa, in August 1997. Most of the recommendations of the committee were accepted.

The MBBS programme commenced in 1999 with 52 students.s. The 50-student quota for intake at inception increased to 100 in 2013, and currently stands at 200. As of 2025, the LASUCOM has graduated and inducted into their respective professional fields, 18 sets of Medical Doctors, 8 sets of Dental Surgeons and 5 sets of Nursing Science students.

The College currently has six (6) faculties:

- Faculty of Clinical Sciences (9 Departments) – Obstetrics & Gynaecology, Behavioral Medicine, Community and Primary Health Care, Radiology, Medicine, Surgery, Anesthesia, Paediatrics, Nursing
- Faculty of Basic Clinical Sciences - (5 departments) – Haematology, Chem. Path, Medical Microbiology, Pharmacology, Therapeutics & Toxicology, Forensic Pathology
- Faculty of Dentistry - (5 departments) – Child Dental Health Care, Restorative Dentistry, Preventive Dentistry, Oral & Maxiofollical Surgery, Oral Pathology
- Faculty of Basic Medical Sciences - (3 departments) – Anatomy, Physiology and Medical Biochemistry.
- Faculty of Pharmacy - (6 departments) – Pharmaceutics & Pharmaceutical Technology, Pharmacology & Toxicology, Clinical Pharmacy, Pharmaceutical Microbiology & Biotechnology, Pharmaceutical and Medicinal Chemistry, Pharmacognosy & Herbal Medicine.
- Faculty of Allied Health Sciences - (3 departments) – Physiotherapy, Medical Laboratory Sciences and Radiography & Radiation Science.

In two decades, the college has witnessed rapid administrative and infrastructural transformation in terms of building structures, equipment, facilities as well as significant increase in personnel.

Plans have been made to construct two new students hostel complexes to add to the existing three hostel structures which have a total housing capacity of 600 students. The new buildings will include a total of 80 rooms to accommodate a minimum of 320 students, among others.
