= Ado J. G. Muhammad =

Nigerian medical practitioner

Dr Ado JG Muhammad
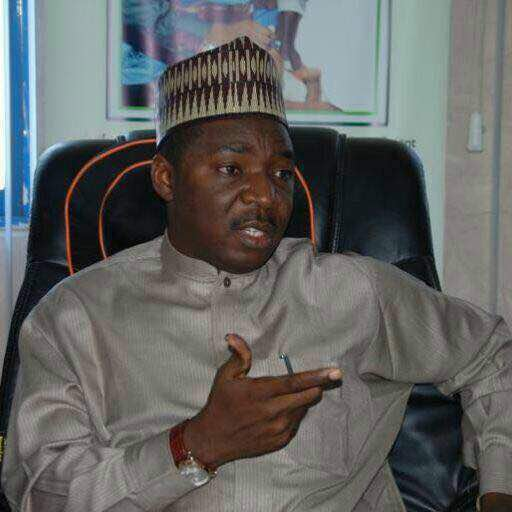
- Dr Ado Muhammad
- Born: 18 January 1967 (age 59)
- Spouse: Bilkisu Ado (m. 1997)
- Children: Fatima, Hauwa, Muhammad, Hindatu and Al-Ameen

Ado Jimada Gana Muhammad OON (born 18 January 1967) is a Nigerian medical doctor and public health administrator who serves as Global Programme Director of the D-8 Health and Social Protection Programme. He previously served as the Executive Director/CEO of the Nigeria's National Primary Health Care Development Agency (NPHCDA), the government agency responsible for developing national primary health care (PHC) policy and supporting states and local government areas (LGAs) to implement them. Muhammad was appointed to that position on 1 November 2011, by the administration of President Goodluck Jonathan. Prior to his appointment, Muhammad served as a special assistant to the permanent secretary, in the State House, Abuja. Muhammad succeeded Muhammad Ali Pate who was appointed as the Minister of State for Health in 2011.

== Education ==
Muhammad graduated from the School of Medicine, University of Ilorin in Nigeria. He was admitted to the school in 1987. He also studied at the University of Wales, United Kingdom where he obtained a master's degree in public health (1996) and the University of Nottingham where he obtained a master's degree in public administration.

== NPHCDA tenure ==
Muhammad worked to achieve seven major objectives at the NPHCDA. The objectives were: To control preventable diseases; Improve access to basic health services; Improve quality of care; Strengthen institutions in the healthcare system; Develop a high-performing and empowered health workforce across the country. Other goals are to strengthen partnerships and engage with communities regularly to get feedback.

== Achievements ==
In what was described by The Guardian UK as "The Toughest Job in Nigerian Healthcare," Muhammad served as Executive Director/CEO of the National Primary Health Care Development Agency (NPHCDA) from November 2011, he played a key role in Nigeria's successful eradication of polio.

He established the National Polio Emergency Operations Centre in October 2012 and introduced community engagement innovations such as health camps, polio survivor groups, religious leaders, volunteer mobilizers, and child-friendly incentives. These efforts reduced wild poliovirus cases from 122 in 2012 to 53 in 2013 and six in 2014 (an 89% decline), with no new cases for over a year by mid-2015. Nigeria was removed from the polio-endemic list in September 2015, earning global praise from the WHO, Bill Gates, and partners as a model for Africa.

The Emergency Operations Centre model was later adapted for epidemic responses across Africa, including during the COVID-19 pandemic for coordination, surveillance, and community engagement in Nigeria and beyond.

He also strengthened routine immunization by deploying over 6,000 frontline workers, improving cold chain infrastructure, and rolling out the pentavalent vaccine nationwide to boost uptake.

Additionally, he launched the "Primary Healthcare Under One Roof" initiative to consolidate services under state agencies, improving coordination and efficiency in Nigeria's federal system.

== Awards ==
On 29 September 2014, President Goodluck Jonathan honoured Muhammad with the national award of the Officer of the Order of the Niger (OON) for his contributions to primary health care in Nigeria. In 2013, Muhammad won the Public Administrator of the Year Award (PAYA), organized annually by the Centre for Policy Development and Political Studies, Lagos, Nigeria. The centre said after announcing the winner that of the 10 nominees for the award, Muhammad scored 3,025 votes, representing over 50 percent of the total votes cast. He was praised for his efforts in "eradication of poliomyelitis; reduction in maternal and infant mortality; initiatives in addressing human resource challenges in the primary health care sub-sector; integration and decentralization of HIV/AIDs intervention in PHC services in over 1,500 PHC facilities." Muhammad also won the Kwame Nkrumah Leadership Award and the Africa Leadership Icon in 2014 at the 71st Conference of AASU, held at OATTU Conference Centre, in Accra, Ghana. The Kwame Nkrumah Leadership Award and Africa Leadership Icon 2014 are awarded by the All-Africa Students' Union (AASU).

== Previous appointments ==
Muhammad previously worked as Senior Technical Adviser (Health Sector), in the Office of the Senior Assistant to the Nigerian President on Millennium Development Goals. Prior to that role, he was National Health Adviser for the Bamako Initiative Programme which was part of the now defunct Petroleum Trust Fund. He had also worked with the National Programme on Immunization (NPI), prior to its merger with the NPHCDA.

== Personal life ==
Muhammad is happily married and has children.
