= Faisal Shuaib =

Nigerian Public Health Professional

Dr Faisal Shuaib, OON, MPH, DrPH
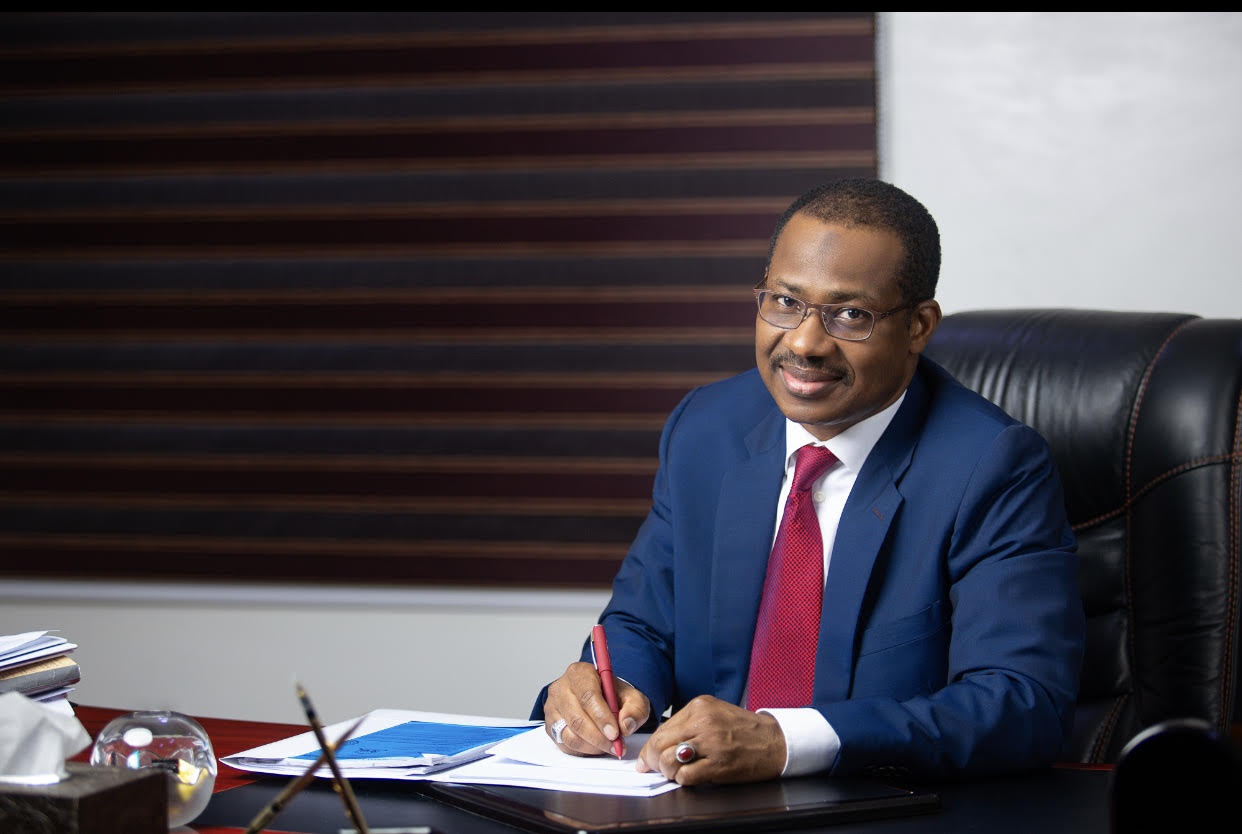

Executive Director of the National Primary Health Care Development Agency
- In office January 11, 2017 – October 20, 2023
- President: Muhammadu Buhari
- Preceded by: Dr. Emmanuel Odu

Incident Manager of the Nigeria Ebola Emergency Operations centre (EEOC)
- In office 2014–2014

Deputy Incident Manager (DIM) and Chief Operations Officer of the National Polio Emergency Operation Center
- In office 2014–2014

Personal details
- Born: Faisal Shuaib; August 15
- Education: Ahmadu Bello University (MD); University of Alabama at Birmingham (DrPH)
- Awards: Officer of the Order of Niger, National Productivity Order of Merit, Nigerian Excellence Award in Public Service
- Scientific career
- Fields: Public health
- Workplaces: University of Alabama at Birmingham, World Health Organization, Bill & Melinda Gates Foundation

Faisal Shuaib OON, MPH, DrPH, (born 15 August) is a Nigerian medical doctor and public health specialist. He served as the executive director and chief executive officer of the National Primary Health Care Development Agency, a parastatal of the Federal Ministry of Health (Nigeria) from 2017 to 2023. Prior to his appointment by President Muhammadu Buhari in January 2017, he was a Senior Programme Officer at the Bill & Melinda Gates Foundation in Seattle, USA.

Shuaib served as the Incident Manager/Head of the Nigeria Ebola Emergency Operation Center during the July - October 2014 outbreak of Ebola Virus Disease. In addition to serving as a Senior Technical Advisor to the Minister of State for Health on Immunization and Polio Eradication, he was also the Chief Operations Officer/Deputy Incident Manager of the National Polio Emergency Operation Centre.

He has received several awards, including the Officer of the Order of the Niger (OON), the Nigeria Excellence Award in Public Service (NEAPS), the National Productivity Order of Merit (NPOM), the Africa COVID-19 Hero Award, among others.

Shuaib is a respected expert on managing epidemics and has authored and co-authored over 70 peer-reviewed scientific publications. He serves as a valuable resource for public health officials and has advised the World Health Organization (WHO) and the Nigeria's Ministry of Health on a range of subjects.

== Education ==
Shuaib holds a medical degree from the Ahmadu Bello University Zaria, Nigeria. He later obtained a Master of Public Health from the University of Lagos in 1998, as well as a Doctor of Public Health Degree from the University of Alabama at Birmingham, USA, in 2020, graduating with distinction.

== Career ==
Shuaib began his early career at the Nasarawa State Ministry of Health, where he rose to the position of Director of Primary Healthcare and Disease Control. He also served as the WHO State and Zonal Coordinator for Nasarawa and the North Central Zone. Additionally, Shuaib worked as a Research Associate at the University of Alabama at Birmingham.

Until his appointment as Executive Director/CEO of the National Primary Health Care Development Agency in January 2017, he was a Senior Program Officer at the Bill and Melinda Gates Foundation (BMGF), Seattle, Washington, USA. At the BMGF, Shuaib was responsible for developing and implementing strategies on polio outbreak response activities in Africa.

Shuaib coordinated Nigeria's successful response to the outbreak of Ebola Virus Disease (EVD) as the Incident Manager of the Ebola Emergency Operations Center (EEOC) in 2014. In this position, he was in charge of establishing a comprehensive system that provided quality diagnostic, treatment, care and follow up of EVD patients, their contacts and their families. He was also a member of the six-man panel established to assess the response of the WHO to the global Ebola outbreak in 2014.

While working with the Bill and Melinda Gates Foundation as Senior Program Officer in charge of polio surveillance and outbreak response in Africa, he developed an innovative smartphone application (AVADAR) and strategy that quadrupled the rate of detection of polio-like cases in Africa and was used to enhance COVID-19 reporting and response.

He previously provided technical advice to the Nigeria Ministry of Health and National Primary Health Care Development Agency in the area of immunization and polio eradication activities.

Shuaib was the Deputy Incident Manager (DIM) and Chief Operations Officer of the National Polio Emergency Operation Center. As Deputy Incident Manager (DIM) of the National Polio EOC, he co-managed the overall coordination of the polio eradication program in Nigeria and also led the Operations Working Group within the EOC, which is responsible for coordinating the implementation of field-level strategies adopted by the larger group that included international development partners. In 2014, he also led the EOC syndicate that jointly developed and implemented new strategies to deliver vaccine to children living in security compromised areas of Borno and Yobe States. As part of this work, he led the team that implemented the first-ever, large-scale community-based campaign using Inactivated Polio Vaccine (IPV).

Under his watch as the executive director of the National Primary Health Care Development Agency (the primary agency with a mandate to control preventable diseases, eradicate polio, and limit the occurrence and impact of diseases using education, immunization and other proven interventions) he piloted the campaigns for the eradication of the wild poliovirus. This led to the WHO declaring Nigeria free of the wild poliovirus on 25 August 2020.

== Awards ==
In recognition of his outstanding achievements, Shuaib has received numerous awards and honors. Some of which are:

- Award of excellence for providing health care to persons of concern during the COVID-19 pandemic through vaccination against the virus, National Commission for Refugees, Migrants and Internally Displaced Persons (November 2022)
- Officer of the Order of Niger (OON), National Honours Award (October 2022)
- Fellowship of the College of Education, Akwanga, Nasarawa State (2023)
- Outstanding vaccination program in Nigeria, Nigerian Excellence Award in Public Service (NEAPS) (October 2022)
- National Productivity Order of Merit Award (May 2022)
- Award for outstanding performances in supporting other disease interventions using the AVADAR structure and resource mobilization for effective implementation of the AVADAR project, in recognition of his conceptualization and development of the AVADAR multi disease surveillance application, WHO AFRO AVADAR Team (May 2022)
- Outstanding Performance in Character and Public Service by the Generational Citizen for Better Leadership Initiative (October 2022)
- National Human Rights Awards (NHRA) (December 2021)
- Africa's COVID-19 Hero of All Time Award Certificate, in recognition of efforts to interrupt the spread of COVID-19 and the vaccine distribution model as best in Africa (July 2021)
- Certificate of Performance Award, by the Civil Society Groups for Good Governance (July 2020)
- Outstanding Healthcare Recognition for primary health care development, by Leader of Health Media Nigeria
- Certificate of Appreciation for valuable contribution to Expanded Program on Immunization, by the WHO (June 2008)

== Publications ==
- Reproductive health effects of aflatoxins: a review of the literature (2010)
- Ebola Virus Disease Outbreak — Nigeria, July–September 2014 (2014)
- Containment of Ebola and Polio in Low-Resource Settings Using Principles and Practices of Emergency Operations Centers in Public Health (2017)
- "AVADAR (Auto-Visual AFP Detection and Reporting): demonstration of a novel SMS-based smartphone application to improve acute flaccid paralysis (AFP) surveillance in Nigeria" (2018)

Political offices
Preceded by Dr Emmanuel Odu	Executive Director of the National Primary Health Care Development Agency; 2017–present	Incumbent
