= Sydani =

Nigerian-based international development consultancy

- Type: Private
- Industry: Management consulting, International development
- Founded: 2018
- Founder: Sidney Sampson
- Headquarters: Abuja, Nigeria
- Area served: Africa, Asia and North America
- Website: sydani.org

Sydani also known as Sydani Group, is a Nigerian-based international development consultancy headquartered in Abuja, Nigeria.

== History ==
Sydani was founded in 2018 by Sidney Sampson. In its early years, beginning in 2018, the organisation worked with Results for Development (R4D) on health financing programmes in Nigeria. This included technical assistance to the Federal Ministry of Health on budget process reforms and to the National Primary Health Care Development Agency and National Health Insurance Scheme on implementation of the Basic Health Care Provision Fund.

During the COVID-19 pandemic, Sydani took part in vaccination activities in Nigeria. A 2024 study reported that, in 2022, the U.S. Centers for Disease Control and Prevention worked with the African Field Epidemiology Network and Sydani to support COVID-19 vaccination activities in nine Nigerian states.

Later in 2023, Sydani was involved in the Southern Religious and Traditional Rulers Engagement for Primary Health Care Delivery (SoRTLE) project in Anambra State. BusinessDay reported that the project involved engaging traditional and religious leaders in support of immunisation and primary health-care services.

In 2023, BusinessDay reported on a health sector seminar organised by Sydani in Abuja to mark its fifth anniversary. The seminar examined the effect of changes in government on public health policies and programmes and was attended by health-sector stakeholders, including officials from the United States Agency for International Development.

Between 2023 and 2024, Sydani provided technical support to the National Primary Health Care Development Agency under the Nigerian Federal Government's Expanded Midwives Service Scheme (eMSS). PUNCH reported that health workers under the scheme had complained of unpaid salaries. A Sydani analyst said the company was not their employer and that NPHCDA was responsible for their employment and payment. Two days later, PUNCH reported that the Federal Government had begun paying the arrears.

In July 2025, Sydani, the Nigerians in Diaspora Commission (NiDCOM) and FirstBank Nigeria launched the Home and Abroad platform, which was designed to provide Nigerians living abroad with access to verified real-estate opportunities in Nigeria and a payment channel through FirstBank. Sydani was responsible for its development, design and implementation.

In August 2025, The Punch reported that Sydani had supported vaccination activities involving HPV, mpox, polio and other vaccines between January and June 2025.

== Research and technology ==
Sydani has been involved in research and technology initiatives in public health and digital systems. In 2024, Sydani-affiliated researchers contributed to studies of COVID-19 vaccination in Benue State and Niger State.

In 2024, Sydani Technologies participated in discussions on harmonising Nigeria's National Identification Number and Bank Verification Number, together with voter identification data, in relation to identification and security.

In December 2025, Sydani coordinated a Gates Foundation-funded study examining midwife-led enterprises in Nigeria, Kenya, Senegal, Uganda and Bangladesh.
