= Bamidele =

Bamidele, meaning "Follow me home" in the Yoruba language, is a given name, sometimes shortened to Dele. Notable people with this name include:

Surname:

- Biyi Bamidele (born 1967), Nigerian novelist, playwright, and filmmaker
- Daniel Bamidele (1949–1986), a Nigerian army officer who was executed by the government of Major General Ibrahim Babangida
- Emmanuel Bamidele (born 1999), Nigerian athlete
- Michael Opeyemi Bamidele (born 1963), Nigerian Lawyer, human right activist, politician, and member of the National Assembly
- Tunde Bamidele (1953–1997), Nigeria football Defender

Given name:

- Bamidele Abiodun (born 1966), Nigerian businesswoman, philanthropist, wife of Dapo Abiodun, governor of Ogun State, Nigeria
- John Adedayo Bamidele Adegboyega (born 1992), British actor and producer
- Dennis Emmanuel Abiodun Bamidele Chijioke Adeniran (born 1999), English professional footballer
- Bamidele Mathew Aiyenugba (born 1983), Nigerian footballer
- James Bamidele Oluwafemi Alabi (born 1994), English footballer
- Bamidele Ali (born 1976), former gridiron football defensive end
- Bamidele Alli (born 1996), English professional footballer
- Bamidele Aturu (1964–2014), Nigerian Lawyer and human rights activist
- Bamidele A. Ojo (born 1960), Nigerian and American political scientist, author, professor of political science, and international studies
- Bamidele Olaseni (born 1996), English-American football player
- Johnson Bamidele Olawumi, Major General of the Nigerian army and former Director-General of the National Youth Service Corps
- Bamidele Olumilua (1940–2020), a Nigerian politician who was the elected Governor of Ondo State, Nigeria
- Michael Bamidele Otiko (1934–1999), the first director of naval education in Nigeria, and later was Governor of Ondo State, Nigeria
- Olanrewaju Olusegun Mark Bamidele Oyebanjo (born 1990), professional footballer
- Olusola Bamidele Oyewole (born 1955), vice-chancellor of Federal University of Agriculture, Abeokuta
- Bamidele Yusuf (born 2001), Nigerian footballer

== See also ==
- Dele (name)
