= Olasupo =

- Gender: Male
- Language: Yoruba

Origin
- Origin: Nigerian
- Meaning: Wealth has gathered together
- Region of origin: South-west Nigeria

OlasupoOlasupo is a Nigerian masculine name of Yoruba origin meaning "Wealth has gathered together." The name is derived from the words “ọlá” (wealth), “sù” (gather), and “pọ̀” (together). The name can also be seen in the shortened form Ṣùpọ̀.

== Notable people with the name ==
=== First name ===
- Supo Shasore (born 1964), Nigerian lawyer
- Supo Ayokunle (born 1957), Nigerian pastor

=== Middle name ===
- Wahab Egbewole, born Wahab Olasupo Egbewole, Nigerian academic

=== Last name ===
- Abideen Olasupo (born 1993), Nigerian entrepreneur
- Ebenezer Obey (born Ebenezer Remilekun Oláṣùpò, 1942), Nigerian juju singer and songwriter
