= Jeleel Ojuade =

Nigerian academic

Jeleel Olasunkanmi Ojuade

Vice-Chancellor of Crown-Hill University
- Incumbent
- Assumed office 2023

Personal details
- Born: Jeleel Olasunkanmi Ojuade; April 18, 1969 (age 57) Ifetedo, Osun state
- Education: University of Ilorin

Jeleel Olasunkanmi Ojuade is Nigerian professor of dance studies, first Yoruba Professor of Dance in Nigeria and the Vice-Chancellor of the Crown-Hill University, Ilorin since January 2023. After Ojuade's inauguration in January 2023, Crown-Hill University was renamed as Ojaja University, following the acquisition of the university by the Pro-Chancellor, a Yoruba monarch, Ooni of Ife, Oba Adeyeye Ogunwusi Enitan Ọjájá II in May, 2023.

Ojuade was appointed a professor in 2019 at the University of Ilorin and conferred the title, Aare Alasa of Ifetedo by the Olubosin of Ifetedo, Oba Akinola Oyetade Akinrera (Latiri 1).

== Life ==
Professor Jeleel Ojuade is a native of Ifetedo in Osun state, one of the western states in Nigeria. He was born in 1970. His early childhood life was spent at Ifetedo but he had the opportunity to travel, accompanying his father's troupe to different states across Nigeria. As a child, he participated in the Festival of Arts and Culture, also known as FESTAC '77, which took place in Lagos Nigeria in 1977. As a teenager, he participated in dance performances both at the local and state levels.

== Education ==
Ojuade obtained a first degree and masters degree in Performing Arts from the University of Ilorin but obtained a PhD in Performance Studies (with the specialization in dance) from the Institute of African Studies, University of Ibadan. Ojuade also obtained a degree in Common Law (LL.B Hons) and a Masters degree in Copyright Laws (LL.M ) both from the University of Ilorin, Kwara State, Nigeria.

== Professional Achievements ==
As an academic staff of University of Ilorin and a professor of Dance Studies, Ojuade specialises in Performance Studies, Choreography and Dance Culture. His publications which cut across the areas of his specialty include:

- The Secularization of Bata Dance in Nigeria 2002
- Change and Continuity in Bata Performance 2005
- African Dance in Diaspora: The Examples of Yoruba Bata and Dundun 2011

Jeleel presented the 208th inaugural lecture in 2021 at the University of Ilorin. The lecture was titled: "Dance is Life, Life is Dance: A Cyclical Nature of Man on Earth". He was one-time President of the Association of Dance Scholars and Practitioners of Nigeria (ADSPON) .
