= Abdul Ganiyu Ambali =

Nigerian academic (1967–2026)

Prof. Abdul Ganiyu Ambali

9th Vice-Chancellor of University of Ilorin
- In office 2012–2017
- Preceded by: Is-haq Oloyede
- Succeeded by: Sulyman Age Abdulkareem

Personal details
- Born: Abdul Ganiyu Ambali; 29 November 1957 Ilorin, Northern Region, Federation of Nigeria (now Kwara State, Nigeria)
- Died: 6 June 2026 (aged 68)
- Education: Ahmadu Bello University; University of Liverpool
- Occupation: Academic; author
- Profession: Veterinary

Abdul Ganiyu Ambali (29 November 1957 – 6 June 2026) was a Nigerian academic, administrator and vice chancellor of the University of Ilorin. Ambali was also chairman of the Association of West African Universities (AWAU), and a recipient of one of Nigeria's highest honours, CON.

== Early life and education ==
Abdul Ganiyu Ambali was born in Ilorin, Kwara State to the family of Mall. Ambali Gidado and Mrs. Husseina Angulu. Ambali had his primary education at Pakata Primary School, Ilorin, he proceeded to McBride Secondary School Jalingo, (now Government Secondary School, Jalingo) in Taraba State, Nigeria. Abdul was awarded a scholarship from the Borno State government to pursue an undergraduate degree in veterinary medicine at the Ahmadu Bello University which he completed in 1981. He had his masters and Doctorate degree from the University of Liverpool, United Kingdom. Ambali became a Member of College of Veterinary Surgeons of Nigeria, (MCVSN) in 2004 and Fellow of College of Veterinary Surgeons of Nigeria (FCVSN) in 2009.

== Career ==
Abdul Ganiyu started his career as an Assistant at the University of Maiduguri immediately after his National service where he served with the Ministry of Rural & Community Development, Kano in 1982. Ambali became a Professor in 1995. He has served as a member of the National Universities Commission (NUC), Veterinary Council of Nigeria (VCN), Department of Livestock Services of the Federal Livestock Department, Federal Ministry of Agriculture, monitoring the accreditation of several institutions, industries and agencies. As the vice chancellor of the University of Ilorin, he stated that "his target for the university is for it to be the number one varsity in Africa".

== National service ==
Ambali served as the Collation Officer for the 2015 Presidential election in Nigeria and Returning Officer for Governorship election for Niger State.

== Controversy ==
Legit reported that he was walked out by House of Representatives Standing Committee on Tertiary Education and Services after failing to explain the amount allocated for several projects in 2015. The committee declined to take a look at the university's 2016 budget saying that of 2015 was shrouded in controversy. A member of the committee Hon. Kehinde Odeneye was quoted as saying "How many days were spent at the hotels and who were the guests you hosted? Then another N100 million for takeoff grant for new departments without actually telling us how many they are and the things needed for the takeoff. Also N50 million on workshops and seminars. This is apart from the training grants obtained. Then, there is maintenance of buildings which also is without details".

== Personal life and death ==
Ambali was married with children. His hobbies included playing football, watching wildlife films and listening to music.

Ambali died after a brief illness on 6 June 2026, at the age of 68. The University of Ilorin Vice Chancellor Wahab Egbewole announced Janazah was to be held at 4pm the same day. University of Ilorin Senate later announced plan to Immortalise Ambali, describing him as a visionary leader who repositioned the university as a centre of academic excellence and stability, marked by peace, growth, and global recognition.

== Honours and awards ==
Ambali was a recipient of several awards some of which include

- Distinguished Veterinarian Award, 2013, by the Nigerian Veterinary Medical Association (NVMA)
- Fellow of Science Association of Nigeria (SAN)
- Fellow of the Institute of Corporate Administration of Nigeria
- Fellow of the Solar Energy Society of Nigeria
- National Merit Award of Officer of the Order of the Niger (OON) by the Federal Government of Nigeria.
