= General Hospital Nangere =

Public hospital in Yobe State, Nigeria

Geography
- Location: Nangere, South, Yobe State, Nigeria

History
- Opened: 2019

Links
- Lists: Hospitals in Nigeria

The General Hospital Nangere is a public hospital, located in Sabon Garin Nangere, Nangere Local Government Area, Yobe State, Nigeria. It was established in 2019, and operates on 24hours basis.

== Description ==
The Nangere General Hospital was licensed by the Nigeria Ministry of Health with a facility code 35/12/1/2/1/0001 and registered as Secondary Health Care Centre
