= General Hospital Yunusari =

Public hospital in Yobe State, Nigeria

Geography
- Location: Yunusari, East, Yobe State, Nigeria
- Coordinates: 13.09413°N 12.1037°E

History
- Opened: 2003

Links
- Lists: Hospitals in Nigeria

The General Hospital Yunusari is a public hospital, located in Yunusari, Yunusari Local Government Area, Yobe State, Nigeria. It was established in 2003, and operates on 24hours basis.

== Description ==
The General Hospital Yunusari was licensed by the Nigeria Ministry of Health with a facility code 35/16/1/1/1/0030 and registered as Primary Health Care Centre. It was upgraded to a general hospital in the year 2022.
