= General Hospital Fika =

Public hospital in Yobe State, Nigeria

Geography
- Location: Fika, South, Yobe State, Nigeria

History
- Opened: 1990

Links
- Lists: Hospitals in Nigeria

The General Hospital Fika is a public hospital, located in Fika, Fika Local Government Area, Yobe State, Nigeria. It was established in 1990, and operates on 24hours basis.

== Description ==
The General Hospital Fika was licensed by the Nigeria Ministry of Health with a facility code 35/04/1/2/1/0001 and registered as Secondary Health Care Centre.

== Departments ==
- Antenatal Care (ANC) Unit
- Immunization Unit
- Family Planning
- Intensive Care Services Unit
- Accidents and Emergency Unit
- Nutrition and Dietary Unit
- Health Education and Community Mobilization Unit
- Maternity Unit
