= Fact Check Africa =

Non-profit organisation

- Type: Non-profit organisation
- Industry: Journalism
- Founded: June 2022; 4 years ago
- Headquarters: Nigeria
- Area served: Nigeria, Cameroun and Senegal
- Key people: Abideen Olasupo (Executive director); Mustapha Lawal
- Services: Fact checking
- Website: factcheckafrica.net

Fact Check Africa is a non-profit independent fact checking platform set up in 2022 to verify claims and debunking fake news around electoral activities in Nigeria under the Brain Builders Youth Development Initiative, a non-government and non-profit organisation. The organisation was established by Nigerian civic entrepreneur Abideen Olasupo as Fact Check Election and then rebranded itself as FactCheckAfrica in 2023 when it expanded its scope to cover not only election-related activities, but also government-related issues, climate and conflicts in Africa.

In 2023, FactCheckAfrica was one of two winners of the U.S.-West Africa Tech Challenge, where it demonstrated an artificial-intelligence-powered fact-checking tool known as My AI Factcheck.TechCabal subsequently reported on the platform’s use of artificial intelligence and external news sources to assist users in assessing claims.

In May 2025, FactCheckAfrica became a verified signatory of the International Fact-Checking Network’s Code of Principles following a review covering areas including methodology, funding transparency, sources and nonpartisanship.

The organisation has also conducted fact-checking and digital-literacy training programmes for students, educators, journalists and other information stakeholders in Nigeria.
