= MC BigJohny =

Nigerian comedian, event host, and content creator

- Born: John Taiwo Ojiebun; Ibadan, Oyo State, Nigeria
- Education: B.Sc. Mass Communication, University of Ilorin
- Notable work: CLAP Owambe Editions, Son of Jonathan

Comedy career
- Years active: 2015–present
- Medium: Stand-up comedy, event hosting

John Taiwo Ojiebun (known professionally as MC BigJohny or BigJohny Da Talkative) is a Nigerian comedian, master of ceremonies, and content creator. He is best known for his stage performances, event hosting, and his comedy series CLAP With BigJohny & Friends, later rebranded as CLAP Owambe Editions. He has performed widely across Nigeria and is regarded as one of the prominent comedic voices emerging from Ibadan, Oyo State.

== Early life and education ==
Ojiebun was born and raised in Ibadan, Oyo State, Nigeria. He obtained a bachelor's degree in Mass Communication from the University of Ilorin, where he began performing comedy in 2015.

== Career ==
MC BigJohny started his professional comedy career in Ibadan, organizing small-scale shows that evolved into the widely recognized CLAP With BigJohny & Friends. The show later transitioned into CLAP Owambe Editions, a series that blends stand-up comedy with Yoruba traditional celebration themes. A 2024 installment, the Coronation Edition, was held in Ibadan.

He has appeared at several major Nigerian comedy events, including AY Live, Laff Matazz, and Akpororo vs Akpororo, sharing stages with leading Nigerian comedians. In addition to his comedy career, BigJohny is an accomplished master of ceremonies, reportedly hosting over 1000 events across the world.

== Son of Jonathan and later work ==
In 2025, BigJohny staged his Father’s Day comedy special titled Son of Jonathan at Filmhouse Cinemas, Dugbe, Ibadan. The performance, dedicated to his late father Elder Jonathan Ojiebun, explored themes of fatherhood, masculinity, and cultural expectations. Discussing the show, he explained that the event aimed to highlight men’s emotional and societal struggles, subjects often overlooked in mainstream Nigerian comedy.

== Recognition ==
BigJohny was nominated in 2022 for both Comedian of the Year and MC of the Year at the Blingz Events Award, winning the latter category.

== Style ==
Observational humour, satire, and cultural storytelling with Yoruba cultural references.
