= Olayemi Akinwunmi =

Nigerian academic

Olayemi Akinwumi

Vice-Chancellor of Federal University of Lokoja
- Incumbent
- Assumed office 15 February 2021
- Preceded by: Angela Freeman Miri

Personal details
- Born: Olayemi Durotimi Akinwumi; 20 January 1964 (age 62)
- Profession: Academic; Educator; Administrator

Olayemi Durotimi Akinwunmi (born 20 January 1964) is a Nigerian professor of African history who became the vice-chancellor of the Federal University of Lokoja, Kogi State, Nigeria since 2021. He was the Deputy Vice-Chancellor at the Nasarawa State University, Keffi until his appointment as the Vice-Chancellor of the Federal University of Lokoja.

== Biography ==
Akinwunmi was born on 20 January 1964 and graduated from the University of Ilorin as a History major, he was later employed as a lecturer at the department of History at the university and obtained his doctorate degree, attaining the rank of senior lecturer in 1996. Akinwumi worked as a visiting professor at the Institut for Ethnologie at Freie Universitat, Berlin, Germany between 1999 and 2004.

On his return to Nigeria in 2004, Akinwumi was employed by Nasarawa State University, Keffi (NSUK), where he partnered with Adamu Baikie, a renowned scholar and educationist, who was the Vice-chancellor in the development of the new institution. Akinwumi worked in several positions in the university including as head of department, dean of faculty and deputy vice chancellor amongst others.

== Awards ==
Akinwumi's commitment to scholarship has earned him several awards, notably the Ali Mazrui Award for Academic Excellence, the Stellenbosch Institute of Advanced Studies Award and the prestigious von Humboldt Award. He has also received the Nord-Sud-Kooperation Award from the University of Zurich, the European Research Award and the Institute of Commonwealth Studies Award from University College, London, and the German Deutscher Akademischer Austauschdienst (DAAD Award).

He has held the position as the president of the Historical Society of Nigeria, and a distinguished fellow of the body. He is also a fellow of the Nigerian Academy of Letters (FNAL), among others. He is credited with several publications of local and international journals and books notably; Conflict and Crises in Nigeria: A Political History since 1960, and Colonial Contest for the Nigerian Region: A History of the German Participation.
