= Salamat Ahuoiza Aliu =

Nigerian neurosurgeon

- Born: 1980 (age 45–46); Ilorin, Kwara State
- Education: University of Ilorin
- Occupations: Neurosurgeon, National Hospital, Abuja
- Known for: First woman neurosurgeon in West Africa

Salamat Ahuoiza Aliu is a Nigerian neurosurgeon.

== Early life and education ==
Salamat Ahuoiza Aliu, was born in Ilorin, Kwara State, North Central, Nigeria, in 1980, but she is a native of Okene, Kogi State. She attended the medical school at the University of Ilorin for her first degree. She trained and specialized in neurosurgery at Usmanu Danfodiyo University under Professor B.B. Shehu.

== Medical career ==
Aliu is the first female neurosurgeon in West Africa and also the first indigenous-trained female neurosurgeon in Nigeria. She currently works at the University of Ilorin Teaching Hospital.

== Appointment ==
On July 21, 2026, Aliu was appointed as the medical director of Freeman Children's Clinic in Joplin, Missouri, United States.

== Personal life ==
Aliu is married with children.

== Publications ==
- "Knotting of a nasogastric feeding tube in a child with head injury: A case report and review of the literature"

Aliu, alongside seven other physicians, discusses the complications that can arise from the placement of a nasogastric tube, a common procedure for patients who are unable to feed themselves. In previous case studies regarding nasogastric tubes, complications such as coiling and knotting are blamed on small bore tubes and are said to be more common in patients with small stomachs. However, Aliu and her colleagues challenge the position that small stomachs are at a greater risk for tube knotting, based on the extreme rarity of related complications in children. Instead, they argue that factors such as excess tube length, gastric surgery, and reduced gastric tone, specifically due to head injury, are the most reasonable predispositions for nasogastric tube knotting.

- "Using the head as a mould for cranioplasty with methyl methacrylate"

Aliu and her colleagues discuss the benefits of using methacrylate in the absence of custom bone, which can be too expensive or unavailable during a cranioplasty. They further describe cranioplasty techniques leading to successful outcomes when employing methacrylate.

- "Subdural actinomycoma presenting as a recurrent chronic subdural hematoma"

In this joint publication with the previously mentioned colleagues, Aliu brings to light a rare chronic bacterial infection in the brain called subdural actinomycoma, which is commonly mistaken radiologically with a subdural hematoma or an empyema.
