= John Omoniyi Abiri =

Nigerian academic

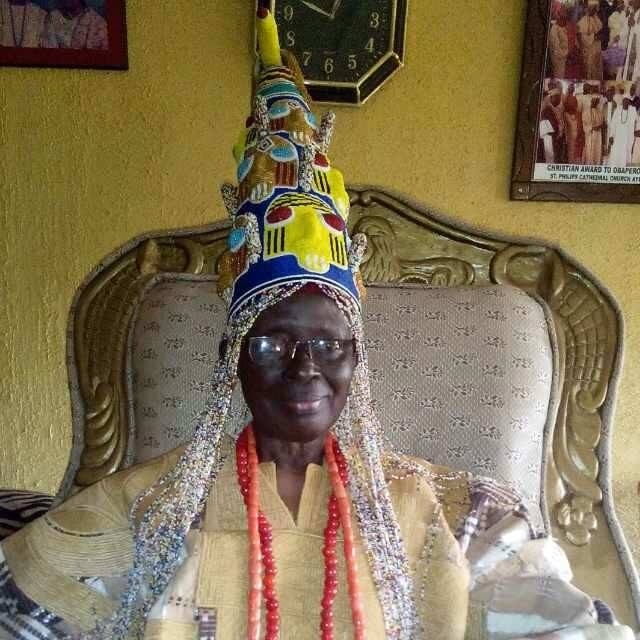
- John Omoniyi Abiri

John Omoniyi Abiri is a Nigerian academic.

== Life ==
Abiri was born into the family of Pa Abraham 'Muyiwa Abiri (d.1964) at 28, Oke Ayetoro street, Ile-Ife, South-Western Nigeria. Abiri attended St. Phillips School, Ile-Ife and, Odudwa College Ile-Ife, where he obtained the West African School Certificate in the first division in 1955. After a brief spell in the Federal civil service in Lagos and as a teacher at Ife Grammar School Ile-Ife, he gained admission to the University College, Ibadan, in 1957 and graduated in 1961.

Abiri holds the B.A degree of the University of London (1961), Master of Education (M.Ed) degree (1965) of the University of Birmingham, U.K as well as the PGCE (1963) and the Ph.D. (1969) degrees, both of the University of Ibadan, Nigeria. He is a winner of both the Irving Bonnar Graduate Prize and the George Cadbury Prize in Education.

After obtaining his first degree (B.A), he served as a graduate teacher at Ife Grammar School, Ile-Ife, in 1961–1962. He later moved to the University of Ibadan, starting as a Research Fellow and then as Assistant Lecturer. He rose steadily through the academic ranks until he became a Reader (Associate Professor). He was a visiting Senior Fellow in the Institute of Education of the University of London in 1973–74. He later served in an acting capacity as the First Head of Department and Dean of the Faculty of Education at the then Jos Campus of the University of Ibadan in 1974–76. He subsequently secured an appointment in 1976 at the then University College, Ilorin, later the University of Ilorin, where he served as the first Head of Department and Dean of the Faculty of Education with the responsibility of providing leadership in the formulation and initiation of the degree After obtaining his first degree (B.A) he served as a graduate teacher at Ife Grammar School, Ile-Ife in 1961–1962. He later moved to the University of Ibadan, starting as a Research Fellow and then as Assistant Lecturer, he rose steadily through the academic ranks until he became a Reader (Associate Professor). He was a visiting Senior Fellow in the Institute of Education of the University of London in 1973–74. He later served in acting capacity as the First Head of Department and Dean of the Faculty of Education at the then Jos Campus of the University of Ibadan in 1974–76. He subsequently secured appointment in 1976 at the then University College, Ilorin, later University of Ilorin, where he served as the first Head of Department and dean of the Faculty of Education with responsibility of providing leadership in the formulation and initiation of the degree programmes of that faculty. He was the Resident Electoral Commissioner of the Federal Electoral Commission successively in four states of Nigeria between 1987 and 1993. He was once an Assistant Editor of the West African Journal of Education (WAJE) at the University of Ibadan and Editor of the Nigerian Journal of Educational Psychology. He is the author of Moremi: An Epic of feminine Heroismand its Yoruba version Moremi: Itan Akoni Obinrin. He is also the Editor and Co-author of Perspectives on History of Education in Nigeria. He has many scholarly articles published in learned journals. He supervised many students for M.Ed., and Ph.D. degrees at the University of Ibadan and Ilorin, many of whom have become full Professors. He retired from academia in 2001 after many years of meritorious service, including 25 years as a full professor.

He was awarded the title of Baapitan of Ife (Chief Historian of Ife) by the Ooni of Ife in 1981, and later crowned as the paramount ruler and king of Abiri town, with the title of Obapero of Abiri in 2010.
