= Sulyman Age Abdulkareem =

Nigerian academic

10th Vice-Chancellor of University of Ilorin
- In office 2017–2022
- Preceded by: Abdul Ganiyu Ambali
- Succeeded by: Wahab Egbewole

Personal details
- Born: Sulyman Age Abdulkareem
- Education: University of Ilorin, University of Detroit, University of Louisville

Sulyman Age Abdulkareem is a Nigerian academic and professor of chemical engineering who served as the Vice-Chancellor of the University of Ilorin from 2017 to 2022.

Abdulkareem graduated from University of Detroit in the US in 1980, with BChE and MChE degrees in chemical engineering. In 1988 he was awarded a Ph.D. by the University of Louisville in the US. His areas of specialisation are heterogeneous catalysis and reaction engineering.

Abdulkareem has worked for the Nigerian Steel Development Company in Ajaokuta, Nigeria, and for 3M in Minnesota, US. He was a research engineer and assistant professor in the King Fahd University of Petroleum and Minerals in Saudi Arabia.

Prior to his appointment at the University of Ilorin, Abdulkareem was Vice-Chancellor of Al-Hikmah University in Ilorin. He was appointed as new Vice-Chancellor of the University of Ilorin on 28 August 2017 and took up his role on 16 October 2017. He was preceded by Abdul Ganiyu Ambali.

== Publications (selected) ==
- Adeyanju, Comfort Abidemi; Ogunniyi, Samuel; Ighalo, Joshua O.; Adeniyi, Adewale George; Abdulkareem, Sulyman A. (2021). "A review on Luffa fibres and their polymer composites". Journal of Materials Science. 56 (4): 2797–2813. Bibcode:2021JMatS..56.2797A. doi:10.1007/s10853-020-05432-6. ISSN 0022-2461.
- Abdulkareem, SA; Adeniyi, AG (30 June 2017). "Production of Particle Boards Using Polystyrene and Bamboo Wastes". Nigerian Journal of Technology. 36 (3). African Journals Online (AJOL): 788–793. doi:10.4314/njt.v36i3.18. ISSN 2467-8821.
- Abdulkareem, S.A.; Raji, S.A.; Adeniyi, A.G. (19 July 2017). "Development of particleboard from waste styrofoam and sawdust". Nigerian Journal of Technological Development. 14 (1). African Journals Online (AJOL): 18. doi:10.4314/njtd.v14i1.3. ISSN 2437-2110.
