= Temi Olajide =

Nigerian child/sleep training consultant

Temitope Olajide
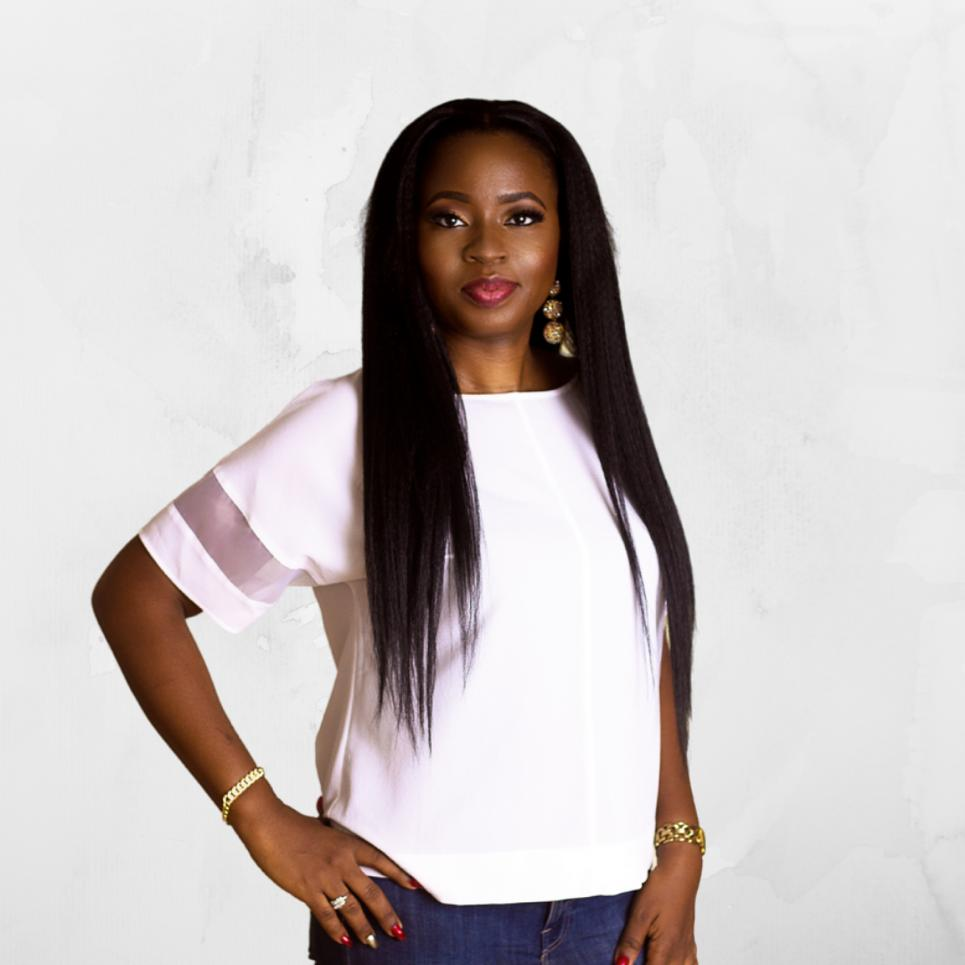
- Education: University of Ilorin
- Occupations: Child sleep consultant; Author
- Years active: 2016–present

Temi Olajide is the first Nigerian Child Sleep Consultant. She is the founder of Mummyclinicc Global Services, an organisation that provides strategies and practicable solutions to the challenges of parents in raising children in the digital age through their online platform. She was listed in the Leading Ladies Africa – 100 most inspiring women in Nigeria 2016 alongside Jemima Osunde, Kiki Mordi, Mercy Chinwo, Nancy Isime, Natasha Akpoti and other notable Nigerian women. She is also the author of Wi-Fi Kids and Analog Parents on Amazon Books, a co-founder of the Association of Child Sleep Consultants of Nigeria, and a member of the International Association of Child Sleep Consultants.

== Early life and education ==
Temi is the oldest child and only girl in a family of four children. As a child, she wanted to be a successful business mogul, philanthropist and renowned speaker.

She graduated with a BSc with Upper second-class honours in Chemistry from the University of Ilorin in 2003. She also holds a certificate in Introductory Journalism from the London School of Journalism and a certificate in Makeup Artistry and Aesthetic Spa from the London School of Makeup. She received a certification in Potty Training and Child Sleep Behaviour from the Institute of Pediatric Sleep and Parenting, becoming the first Nigerian to be certified in the field.

== Career ==
After graduating from the University of Ilorin and completing mandatory national service, she worked with Zenith Bank Plc. She left the banking industry after having her first child to be a business consultant. She became a child sleep and potty training consultant out of her passion to help other mums in achieving their dreams of raising well-rounded children.

In her interview with Henry Ojelu of Vanguard, she stated that she was experiencing sleepless nights in raising her kids which were overwhelming and exhausting, and that prompted her to seek knowledge with the aim to find solutions. It was after joining Instagram in 2016 that she saw other mothers struggling with motherhood and decided to find a means to help them. In 2007, while in London and pregnant, she was intrigued by a TV program where a sleep consultant was showing how to sleep-train children
In December 2017, she started Mummyclinicc, an online platform that provides strategies to the challenges of childrearing. She started Mummyclinicc with only the money spent on internet connection. She focuses on sleep and potty training services, as well as running classes and mummy coaching programs for mothers to get their children to cooperate with them and others. She authored a book, Wi-Fi Kids and Analog Parents which addresses the changes in the dynamics of parenting in the digital age compared to that of time past and how to handle those changes. She is a co-founder of the Association of Child Sleep Consultants of Nigeria, and was accepted as a member of the International Association of Child Sleep Consultants in 2019. She works with a consultancy organisation alongside Mummyclinicc.

== Personal life ==
Temi Olajide is married with children. She is a Christian. She is a columnist for BellaNaija, a lifestyle, entertainment and fashion website based in Lagos, Nigeria.
