= University of Ilorin =

Public Research University in Ilorin, Nigeria

- Motto: Latin: Probitas Doctrina
- Motto in English: "Learning and Character"
- Type: Public
- Established: October 25, 1976
- Chancellor: Abdulmumini Kabir Usman
- Vice-Chancellor: Wahab Egbewole
- Faculty: over 500
- Students: 50,000+
- Location: Ilorin, Kwara State, Nigeria; 8.4820°N 4.6716°E
- Campus: Urban
- Nickname: Better By Far
- Website: www.unilorin.edu.ng

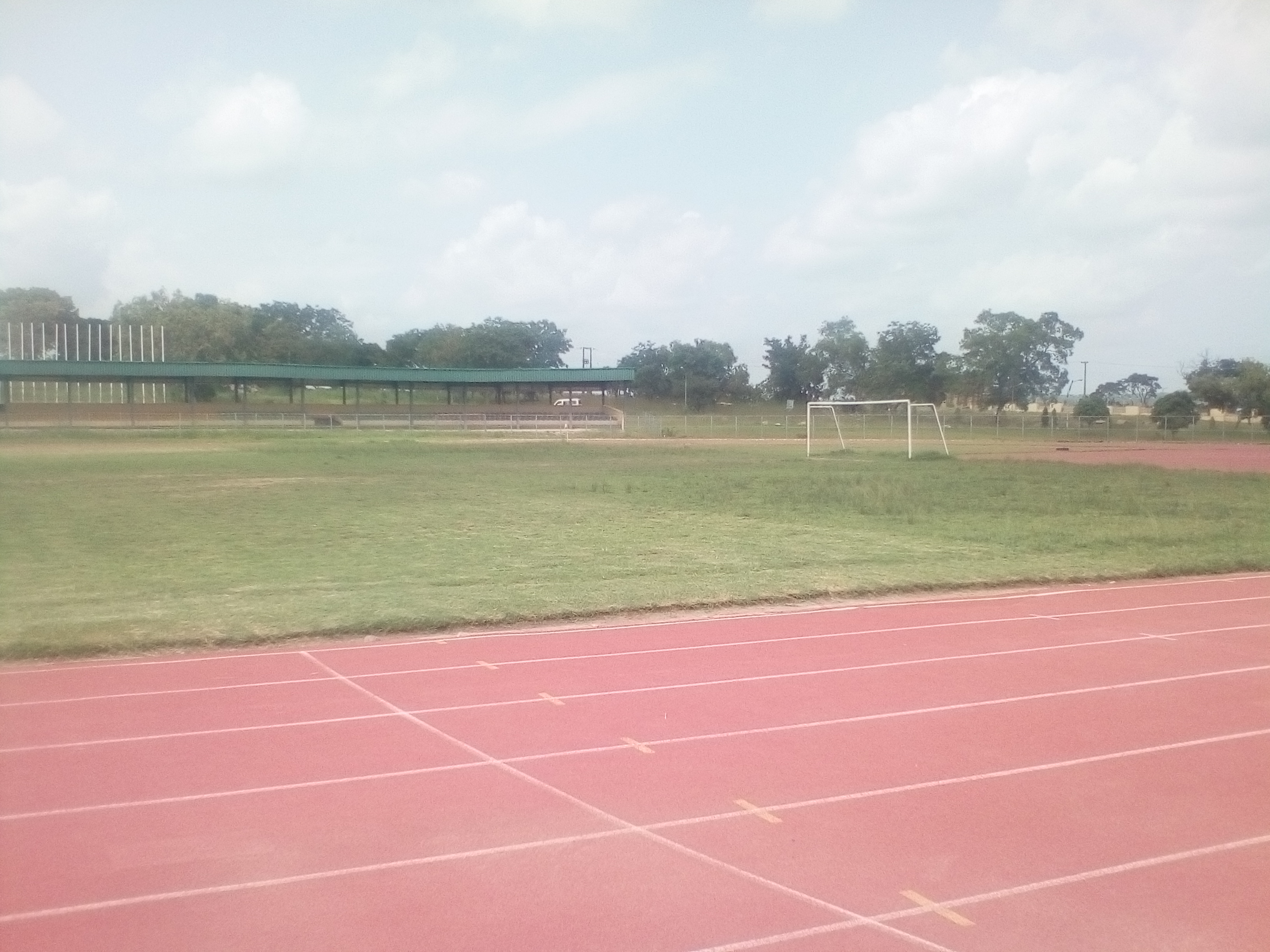
University of Ilorin track Field

University of Ilorin (UNILORIN) is a federal government-owned public research university in Ilorin, Kwara State, Nigeria. The university's main campus sits on an expansive area of land, about 5,000 ha (60,000,000 yd^{2}) in the ancient city of Ilorin; making it the largest university in Nigeria and one of the largest in Africa by landmass. The university comprises 16 faculties and over 100 academic departments offering 103 programmes. It was established by a decree of the Federal Military Government of Nigeria in August 1975. The University of Ilorin has the highest enrollment of foreign students in Nigeria. The establishment aimed to implement one of the educational directives of the Third National Development Plan, which was aimed at providing more opportunities for Nigerians aspiring to acquire university education and to generate high-level manpower, which is vital for the rapidly expanding economy. Compared to other higher institutions of learning in the country, the institution has one of the largest land areas, covering approximately 15,000 hectares of land. It is reported by Joint Admission Matriculation Board (JAMB) to be the most sought-after Nigerian university in 2021. And again in 2023, and also in 2024, it was announced by the JAMB Head, Professor Ishaq Oloyede to be the sought-after University, for the 2023 Unified Tertiary Matriculation Examinations (UTME), making it for the 10th consecutive year.

For 2024-2025, Times Higher Education ranked the university 38th in sub-Saharan Africa.

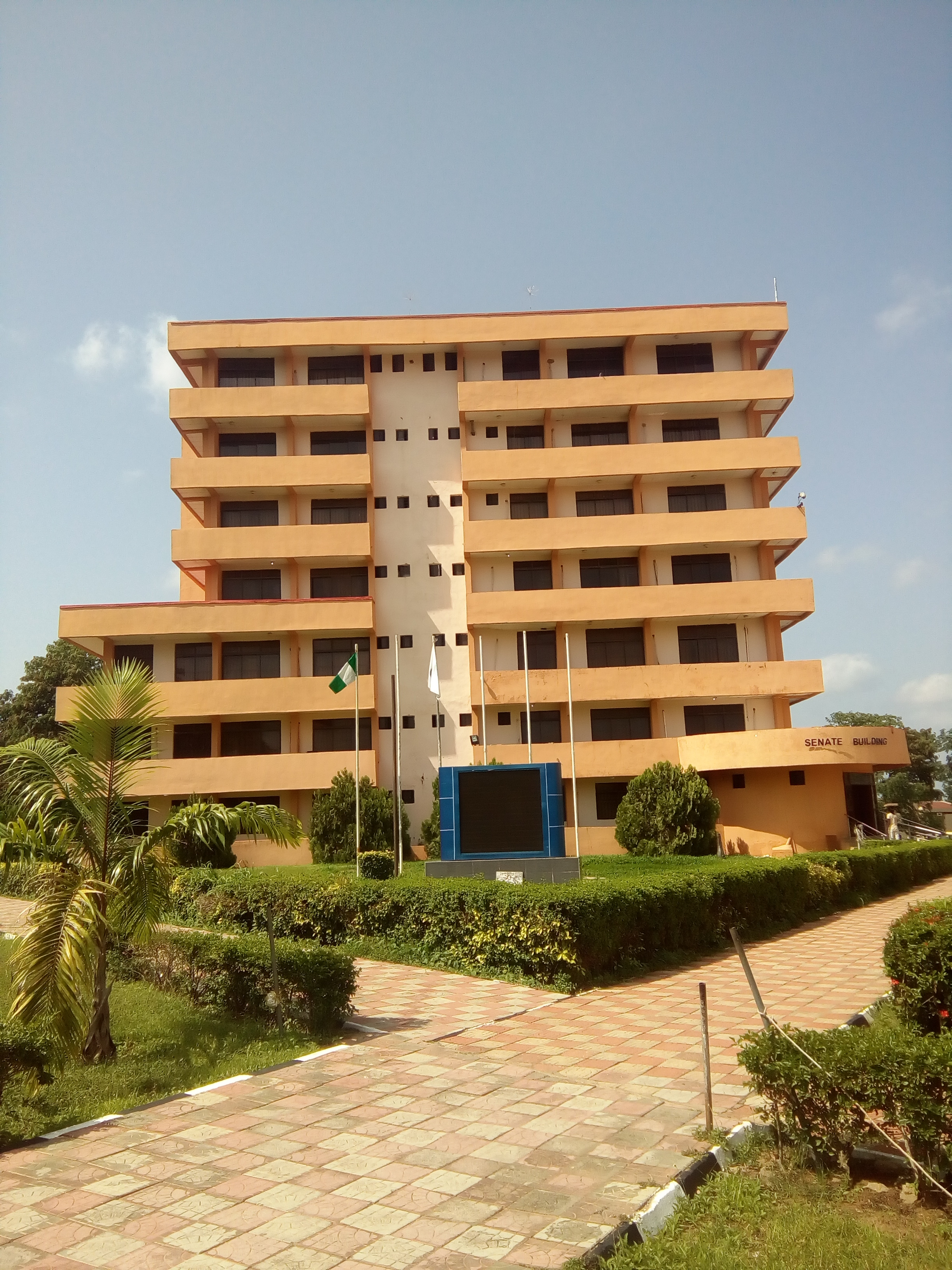
Senate Building

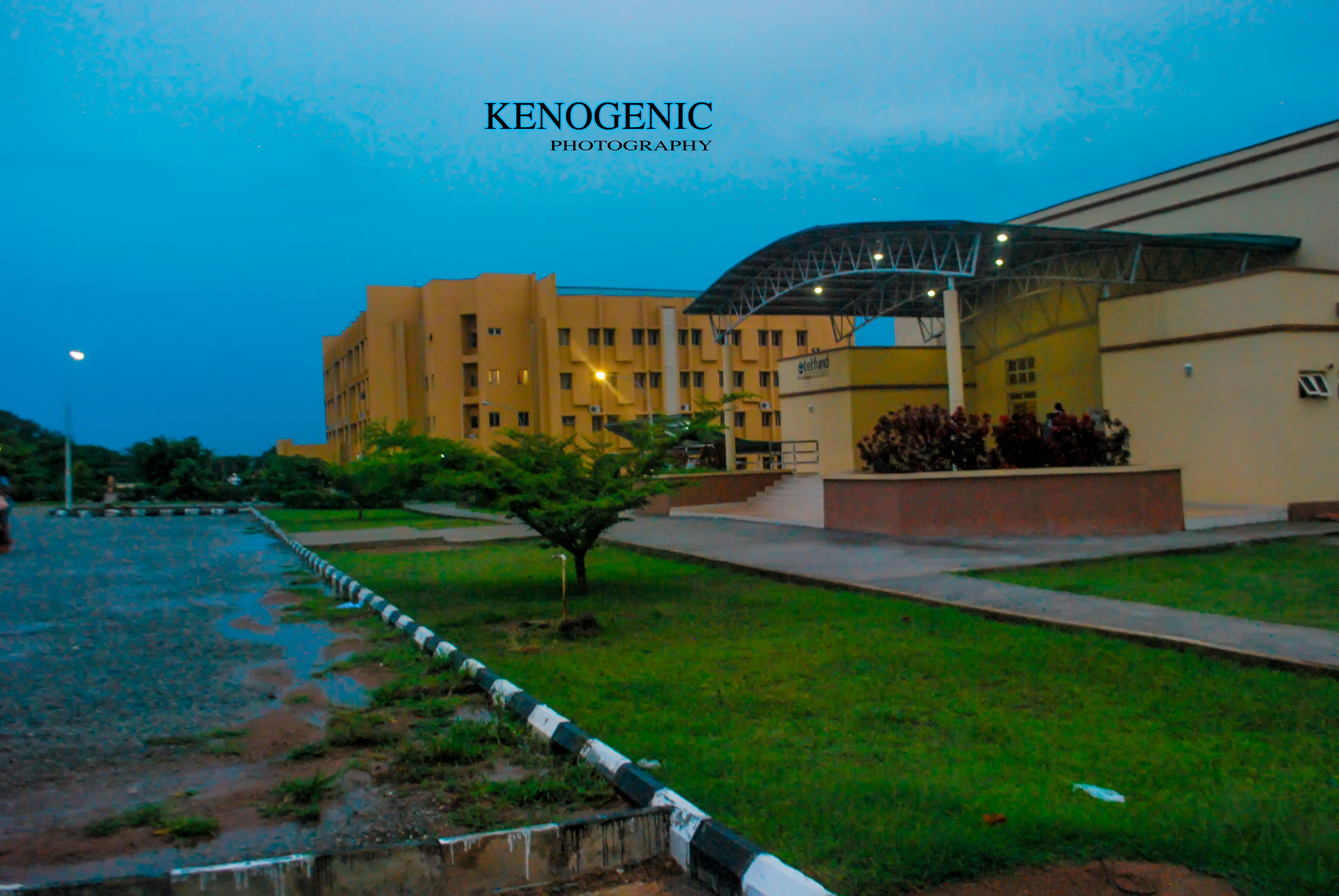
The Faculty of Education

== History ==
The university began in 1975 as a university college affiliated to the University of Ibadan. Dr. T. N. Tamuno who was a professor and Head of the History Department at the University of Ibadan was appointed the first principal of the college in September 1975. By December 1975, Tamuno was appointed the Vice-Chancellor of the University of Ibadan. As a result, Professor O. O. Akinkugbe was appointed as the new Principal for the University of Ilorin (then, a University College) in 1975. Akinkugbe was the former Dean of the Faculty of Medicine, University of Ibadan.

Akinkugbe, made several visits to the second Military Governor of Kwara State, the late Colonel Ibrahim Taiwo in connection with the new institution, such that by March 1976, he had established residence at Ilorin. The support given to the inexperienced Institution by Governor Taiwo continued even more vigorously under the third Military Governor of the State, Brigadier George Agbazika Innih, who ceded a portion of the land of the Kwara State College of Technology to the university. In October 1977, the institution attained full autonomous status with the appointment of Professor O.O Akinkugbe as the first Vice-Chancellor of the university.

The first set of 200 students were admitted on 23 October 1976 following an entrance examination and academic work started on 25 October 1976 following the Principal's address. The University College started with three academic faculties: Arts, Science and Education. The university started off on a portion of the temporary campus of the Kwara State Polytechnic known as the mini-campus. The mini-campus was the site of academic programmes for the Faculties of Arts, Science, Education, Engineering & Technology, Business and Social Sciences and Basic Clinical Sciences section of the Health Sciences Faculty. All operations of the university were conducted on the mini-campus until January 1982 when more than 1000 students studying in sciences were moved to the permanent site of the institution following completion of new Faculty blocks and residences for Natural Sciences and Engineering in the site. In 1983, the law programme was established as a department under the Faculty of Business and Social Sciences. Following a 6-year hiatus, the Law Department was accorded a full-fledged Faculty status in 1993.

The university has fifteen faculties and dozens of (over 60) Academic Departments. The faculties existing in University of Ilorin now are: Arts, Agriculture, Environmental Sciences, Life Sciences, Management Sciences, Physical Sciences, Social Sciences, Communication and Information Sciences, Education, Engineering and Technology, Pharmaceutical Sciences, Veterinary Medicine, Law, Basic Medical Sciences and Clinical Sciences (the last two faculties are operating under the University College of Health Sciences). In addition, there are two Institutes - Institute of Education and Unilorin Sugar Research Institute, this is in addition to a full-fledged Postgraduate School. The university also has several centres notably among which are: Centre for Ilorin Studies, Centre for Peace and Strategic Studies, Ilorin Business School and so on.

Undergraduate Degree programmes run for 3–5, or 6 years, depending on entry qualifications and chosen discipline. Similarly, the postgraduate programmes are run on different dimensions depending on the nature of the program.

There have been several vice-chancellors of the university. Is-haq Oloyede was the first alumnus to be appointed as vice-chancellor.

In 2020, The Nigerian Journal of Technological Development, a quarterly publication of the Faculty of Engineering and Technology, was accepted by the Scopus database.

In 2025, the University of Ilorin reached a milestone and called for the celebration of its 50years of existence. During this period, the institution recounted its achievements, inventions, research, and notable alumni,

=== Vice-chancellors ===
- Prof. Ladipo Akinkugbe (1975–1978) second principal and first vice chancellor
- Prof. A. O. Adesola (1978–1981)
- Prof. S. A. Toye (1981–1984)
- Prof. A. Adeniyi (1985–1992)
- Prof.J.O Oyinloye (1992–1997)
- Prof. S. O. Abdulraheem (1997–2002)
- Prof. S. O. Amali (2002–2007)
- Prof. I. O. Oloyede (2007–2012)
- Prof A. G. Ambali (2012–2017)
- Prof. Sulyman Age Abdulkareem (2017–2022)
- Prof. Wahab Egbewole (2022–present)

== Notable alumni ==
- Femi Adebayo, Nollywood actor.
- Ezekiel Adebiyi, president, Nigerian Society of Bioinformatics and Computational Biology
- Pius Adesanmi, professor and columnist
- Ifedayo Adetifa, Former Director General, Nigeria Centre for Disease Control
- Abdulfatah Ahmed, former Kwara State Governor.
- Sarah Alade, banker, former acting Governor of Central Bank of Nigeria.
- Salamat Ahuoiza Aliu, first woman neurosurgeon in West Africa
- Jekwu Anyaegbuna, writer and poet
- Charles Ayo, former vice-chancellor, Covenant University.
- Ado J. G. Muhammad, Global Programme Director, D-8 Health and Social Protection Programme. Former Executive Director, National Primary Health Care Development Agency.
- Abdul Rasheed Na'Allah, former vice-chancellor of Kwara State University and the University of Abuja
- Aize Obayan, former vice-chancellor, Covenant University and Landmark University.
- Josephine Obiajulu Odumakin, women's rights activist
- Adenike Oladiji, vice-chancellor, Federal University of Technology Akure
- Temi Olajide, child/sleep training consultant
- Johnson Bamidele Olawumi, former Director General, National Youth Service Corps.
- Is-haq Oloyede, the university's first alumni vice chancellor, Registrar Joint Admissions and Matriculation Board
- Nkem Owoh, comedian.
- Kemi Nanna Nandap, Comptroller-General of Nigeria Immigration Service
- Olayemi Akinwumi, Vice-Chancellor of Federal University of Lokoja
- Lekan KingKong, Nigerian content creator and entrepreneur

== Notable faculty ==
- John Omoniyi Abiri, Nigerian academic, the first head of department and dean of the Faculty of Education

== Academic and physical development ==
Following an entrance examination, 200 foundation students were admitted into residence on Saturday, October 23, 1976, and academic activities commenced on Monday, October 25, 1976, after the Principal's maiden address in the Africa Hall. The University College had three foundation Faculties namely: Arts, Science, and Education. The Institution began to develop its programmes in a way that not less than 60% of its effort was directed towards science-oriented programmes.

In October 1977, the Institution attained full autonomous status and has since then developed by leaps and bounds. The student population of 200 in 1976 has increased to 20,084 by the 2005/2006 session, while the total staff strength of the university stood at approximately 3,040 as of March 1, 2007.

Until January 1982, the university carried out its academic programmes, involving the Faculties of Arts, Science, Education, Engineering & Technology, Business and Social Sciences, and the Pre-Clinical aspect of the Health Sciences on the Mini-Campus. The completion of the Faculty blocks for Natural Sciences and Engineering as well as 8 blocks of student hostels by December 1981, made it possible, on 2 January 1982, for the actual movement of over 1,000 science-oriented students to the Main-Campus to pursue their various academic programmes.

The law degree programme was initially established in 1983/84 session as a department in the Faculty of Business and Social Sciences. Though canceled in 1986/87, it was resuscitated in 1993/94 as a full-fledged Faculty.

The Main Campus currently houses the Faculties of Science, Communication and Information Sciences(CIS), Engineering & Technology, Agriculture, Education, Law, Arts, Business and Social Sciences, (following the completion of the new seven-storey Senate Complex), the Unilorin Sugar Research Institute, Postgraduate School, the Main University Library, Computer Services and Information Technology (COMSIT), works yard, conference centre, Unilorin Resources Development and Management Board (URDMB), student canteens, the newly completed 2,000-seat multipurpose auditorium and the Alumni/ Endowment Office. The Mini-Campus presently houses the College of Health Sciences, a mini library, canteens and shopping complex, the Institute of Education, some of the revenue-yielding projects which are under the URDMB such as the Unilorin Computer Centre (Training Wing), Unilorin Bookshop, the bakery, the printing press, and the guest houses. Each campus has a health centre, a post office, and banking facilities.

Aside from two lecture theatres commissioned in 1997, there is an upsurge, from 2002 to date, in the physical development of the Main Campus. Five new Hostels were completed in 2002. Other projects were the Faculty of Education blocks and Lecture theatre; Lecture rooms, Offices and Lecture Theatre for the Faculty of Business and Social Sciences; Faculty of Science Chemistry block; Department of Agricultural Engineering block; offices for the Department of Physical and Health Education; COMSIT building (Phase I) among others.

A water dam and treatment plant to provide uninterrupted water supply to the main campus has just been completed. The university will soon construct a rail-line to boost transportation between the university's main campus and the township.

Apart from the renovation of buildings, a systematic upgrading of teaching and research facilities are being undertaken by the university within its lean resources. This includes the provision of computers, laboratory equipment, etc.

== Growth of faculties ==
From three faculties in 1976, today there are fifteen faculties: Arts (1976), Education (1976), Engineering & Technology (1978), Agriculture (1982), Law (1993, after an initial start-up in 1983), Basic Medical Sciences (2004), Clinical Sciences (2004) Communication and Information Sciences (2008), Veterinary Medicine (2009), Pharmaceutical Science (2010), and Life Science; Physical Science; Environmental Science; Management Sciences; and Social Sciences in (2013).

Altogether, there are over 60 academic departments in the existing ten faculties. Undergraduate degree programmes run for 3,4,5, or 6 years, depending on entry qualifications and discipline. The university started with the traditional British “Three Term System” but later changed into a modified form of the American “Two Semester System” called Harmattan and Rain semesters with effect from 1979/80 session.

Each semester comprises one half of an academic year as determined by Senate. Also, instruction in the various Faculties with the exception of the Health Sciences is by the course system. These courses are quantified into credits. The university has teaching support units which include the Computer Centre, Central Workshop and Stores, Biological Garden, Community Based Experience and Services (COBES), Medical Educational Resources Unit, General Studies (Use of English/National Awareness) Division, and Teaching & Research Farm.

There are also the Public Units which are the University Primary School, the University Secondary School, the Science Laboratory Technology (SLT) programme, Institute of Education and Educational Technology Centre. Although an academic unit, the Library is actively involved in rendering service to the university and the public. In addition, there is a Sugar Research Institute which is mainly a research unit served by academic mainly from Science and Agriculture Faculties.

== Halls of residence ==
- University-owned hostels
  - Village I – Male, 500 places in five compounds
  - Village II (Lagos) – Female, 880 places in five compounds
  - Village III (Abuja and Kwara) – Female, 434 places in four blocks
  - Village IV (Zamfara) – Female, 720 places in seven blocks
  - Village V (Trunil) – Female, 240 places in five blocks
- Private hostels
  - Academic – Male, 80 places
  - Albanic — Female, 250 places
  - Al-Mutawakil – Female, 240 places
  - Arafims 1 – Male, 720 places
  - Arafims 2 – Male, 512 places
  - Asuu – Female, 20 places
  - Atlantic Heights - Female, 4 blocks
  - Bethany – Female, 216 places
  - Easy and Quiet — Female
  - Edge Hostel – Female, 84 places
  - El Mubarak Hostel – Female, 270 places
  - Gulf Pearl – Female, 320 places
  - Hawa Hostel – Female, 324 places
  - Healthcare MCS – Male, 200 places
  - Ibidun Hostel – Female, 252 places
  - Kam Abioye – Female, 280 places
  - Kikelomo Runsewe — Male
  - Las Vegas – Female, 202 places
  - Michael Hostel – Female, 276 places
  - Probitas MCS – Female, 100 places
  - Prime Rose – Female, 324 places
  - Robiat Ajike – Female, 213 places
  - Rubiks Private Hostel – Female, 264 places
  - Sanusi Hostel – Male, 360 places
  - Sanusi Hostel – Female, 84 places
  - Sasakawa Hostel – Female, 44 places
  - Scientific Hostel – Female, 90 places
  - Takleema Hostel - Male, 256 bed space.
  - Vegas 1 Hostel Tanke - Male, Female, 14 places
  - Vegas 2 Hostel Tanke - Male, Female, 18 places
  - Zapel Hostel – Male, 320 places (2 Blocks)

== The case of the 49 sacked lecturers ==
What eventually assumed the toga of a national crisis started within the domain of University of Ilorin in January 2001. Those involved are Academic Staff Union of university (ASUU) - Unilorin branch activists who were battling the then vice-chancellor, Professor S. Oba Abdulraheem and the institution's authority over the delay in the payment of salaries, allowances, and other sundry welfare issues. They were vociferous in their demands and the authorities considered them as a clog in the wheel of their plans for the institution. In such a conservative environment, the university authority considered such radical demand for rights a taboo.

The allegations against the institution's authorities were still on when the parent ASUU commenced a national strike in April 2001. The nationwide university strike was embarked upon against the backdrop of the general rot in universities across the country. Problems of poor infrastructure, poor funding, university autonomy, conditions of service for academic staff and academic freedom budgetary allocation were among the demands of ASUU.

As usual with successive administrations, attempts were made to break the strike. In most of the universities, including the University of Ilorin, attendance registers were opened for lecturers who came to work to sign. This sent jitters down the spines of most of the lecturers who for fear of losing their jobs rushed to the institution on a daily basis to sign the registers. Those of them who believed strongly in the cause of the struggle shunned the register, daring the institution's authority threat to sack those lecturers who defied its order.

At the end of the day and consequent upon series of negotiation between the Federal Government and the ASUU leadership, the strike was called off not without an agreement to be implemented by both parties. ASUU reportedly ensured the insertion of a “no victimization clause” into the agreement. The essence of this was to guarantee that none of its members who partook in the strike would be persecuted because of their involvement. However, the University of Nigeria, (UNN), Nsukka and University of Ilorin terminated the appointment of some lecturers perceived to have played prominent roles in ensuring the success of the strike by ASUU. UNN authorities after public hues and cries reinstated its sacked lecturers. But in Unilorin, its authorities refused to reverse itself. 103 lecturers were given sack letters that did not state the reasons behind the decision.

The breakdown of these figures are: 15 professors, two associate professors. 15 senior lecturer, 18 lecturers: 40 doctors and 12 medical school lecturers out of which 11 were consultants. Consequent upon this sack, the Ayo Banjo-committee was set up to look into the crisis. The committee report did not find any of the UNILORIN 49 guilty. While several others were re-absorbed into the system, the institution's authorities did not see any wisdom in recalling the UNILORIN 49 lecturers. Afterall, they were seen as a fraction of about 700 lecturers in the university. However, among the sacked were deep intellectuals and key functionaries, which led to the stagnation of some classes especially in the medical field which could not graduate students due to the sack of key lecturers. Still, some of the lecturers who could not immediately get alternative accommodation were forcefully ejected from their staff quarters.

Recourse to litigation: When the University of Ilorin authorities remained recalcitrant in its resolve not to reabsorb the Unilorin 49, several external bodies acting as pressure groups intervened, sometimes pleading with the institution's authorities to reconsider its position. Traditional rulers, Yoruba Council of Elders, National Assembly and Nigeria Inter-religious Council (NIREC), all tried to no avail to bring back peace to Unilorin and the entire university system in the country. The Nigerian Labour Congress (NLC), the International Labour Organisation (ILO), UNESCO and a coalition of civil society organisations led by the Committee for the Defence of Human Rights (CDHR) also intervened to no avail. At this point, five of the Unilorin 49, led by Dr. Taiwo Oloruntoba-Oju, approached the Federal High Court, Ilorin to seek redress on behalf of their other colleagues.

Precisely on July 26, 2005, the Federal High Court, Ilorin under Justice Peter Olayiwola, ruled that the termination of the appointment of the affected lecturers on account of participation in the strike without a fair hearing was “illegal and unconstitutional.” The termination exercise was declared “null and void:” and the court ordered their earnest reinstatement.

Nevertheless, the institution exercised its right of appeal when it challenged the judgment at the Court of Appeal. On July 12, 2006, the Court of Appeal sitting in Ilorin, Kwara State upturned the judgment of the Federal High Court by declaring that the university was in order by sacking the 49 lecturers. Out of the three Justices that sat over the case, two Justices, Muntaka Coomasie and T. Abdullahi ruled against the lecturers while Justice Helen Ogunwumiju ruled in favour of the lecturers.

The Court of Appeal ruled that the lecturers should have taken their case to the National Industrial Court being a trade dispute matter as Union leaders: that the lecturers were not sacked for their role in the strike: that since the lecturers were not sacked for any offense, the issue of fair hearing did not arise. At another point, the court upheld the university's claim that the lecturers were given an opportunity for fair hearing while observing in another part that the lecturers were not sacked for any offense.

The judgment of the Court of Appeal was challenged by the lecturers at the Supreme Court.

After about eight years and 10 months of a tortuous legal battle, the 44 sacked lecturers of the University of Ilorin (UNILORIN) in Kwara State were ordered to be reinstated by Nigeria's Supreme Court on December 11, 2009. The apex court ordered their immediate reinstatement and the payment of all their entitlements from February 2001, the date of their illegal disengagement, to date. The 5 UNILORIN ASUU leaders had earlier had their sack reversed by the same Supreme Court on June 12, 2009.

This was reported to be the basis of the two decade - long feud between the University of Ilorin Chapter of the ASUU and the National Headquarters of the Union. Until 2009 when series of consultations between the two factions of the UNILORIN chapter of ASUU, led by Dr. Usman Raheem and Dr. Kayode Afolayan, and a delegation from the national headquarters of the union led by Dr. Ben Ugbeoke were made.

== Students' union and departmental associations ==
The University of Ilorin Students' Union consists of three arms which include Central Executives Council (CEC), Students' Representative Council (SRC) now Senate Council (SC) and Judicial Council.

There are also Students' Faculty and Department Associations at the Faculty and Departmental Level respectively.
