= Haliru Alhassan =

Nigerian medical doctor and politician

Minister of Health
- In office March 2015 – May 2015
- President: Goodluck Jonathan
- Preceded by: Onyebuchi Chukwu
- Succeeded by: Isaac Adewole

Minister of State for Health
- In office February 2014 – March 2015
- President: Goodluck Jonathan
- Preceded by: Muhammad Ali Pate
- Succeeded by: Fidelis Nwankwo

Personal details
- Born: 1954
- Died: 10 May 2020 (aged 66)

Haliru Alhassan (1954 – 10 May 2020) was a Nigerian medical doctor and politician who served as the Minister of Health from March 2015 to May 2015 and as Minister of State for Health from February 2014 to March 2015 under the administration of President Goodluck Jonathan.

== Early life and education ==
Alhassan was born in 1954 and hailed from Sokoto State. He attended the Medical University, Plovdiv, Bulgaria, from 1982 to 1988. He later pursued a master's degree in tropical paediatrics at the Liverpool School of Tropical Medicine between 1994 and 1995.

== Career ==
Alhassan pursued a career in medicine before transitioning into public service. He ventured into politics as a member of the Peoples Democratic Party (PDP), and his contributions to the growth of the party led to his elevation and subsequent appointment as Minister of Health under the administration of President Goodluck Jonathan.

Alhassan served as Minister of State for Health and Chairman of the Presidential Task Force on Polio Eradication in Nigeria between February 2014 and March 2015. Following the departure of Onyebuchi Chukwu, he served as Supervising Minister and was later appointed Coordinating Minister after a cabinet reshuffle in March 2015. As Minister of Health, he played a significant role in Nigeria's healthcare sector, particularly in the eradication of polio, Guinea worm and Ebola, serving as co-lead of the Nigeria Ebola Response Team during the 2014 outbreak. He also advocated for increased government regulation of the health sector.

After his tenure as minister, Alhassan remained active in healthcare governance, serving as Chairman of the Governing Board of the Health Services Management Board in Sokoto State from September 2019 until his death in 2020.

== Personal life and death ==
Alhassan was married and had four children. He died on 10 May 2020 at the age of 66, after a brief illness.
