= Osagie Ehanire =

Nigerian medical doctor and politician (born 1946)

Dr. Osagie Ehanire CON

Minister of Health
- In office 21 August 2019 – 29 May 2023
- President: Muhammadu Buhari
- Deputy: Adeleke Mamora; Ekumankama Joseph Nkama
- Preceded by: Isaac Adewole
- Succeeded by: Muhammad Ali Pate

Minister of State for Health
- In office 11 November 2015 – 28 May 2019
- President: Muhammadu Buhari
- Minister: Isaac Adewole
- Preceded by: Khaliru Alhassan
- Succeeded by: Adeleke Mamora

Personal details
- Born: Osagie Emmanuel Ehanire; 4 November 1946 (age 79)
- Party: All Progressives Congress
- Education: LMU Munich
- Alma mater: Royal College of Surgeons in Ireland
- Occupation: Surgeon

Osagie Emmanuel Ehanire CON (born 4 November 1945) is a Nigerian medical doctor and politician who served as the minister of Health from 2019 to 2023. He previously served as the minister of state for Health from November 2015 to May 2019.

== Early life ==
Ehanire was born on 4 November 1946 in Warri Town, Warri South Local Government Area of Delta State.

== Education ==
After his primary education, Ehanire attended Government College Ibadan in Oyo State for his West African School Certificate where he excelled at his Higher School Certificate examination. Ehanire went on to study Medicine at LMU Munich in Germany, qualifying as a Surgeon. He went on to the Teaching Hospital of the University of Duisburg and Essen and to the BG Accident Hospital in Duisburg, Germany for his post graduate education. In 1976, he attended the Royal College of Surgeons in Ireland where he obtained a postgraduate Diploma in Anaesthetics. He got his Board Certification in both General Surgery and Orthopaedic Trauma Surgery at the Medical Board of North Rhine-Westphalia in Düsseldorf, Germany. In 1984, he became a Fellow of West African College of Surgeons.

== Career ==
Ehanire worked in Germany as a Resident Anesthesiologist, Resident Vascular Surgeon and Resident General Surgeon in Thoracic Surgery at various hospitals. He also served as Clinical Instructor, Fracture Internal Fixation Course at BG Accident Hospital in Duisburg, Germany. On his return to Nigeria in 1982, he worked at the University of Benin Teaching Hospital as Senior Registrar in the Department of Surgery (Orthopaedic Surgery), a position he held until 1984. Between 1985 and 1990, he joined the Shell Petroleum Development Company Hospital as a Divisional Consultant Surgeon. He also served at various times on the Medical Review Board of Edo State Hospital Management Board and remains as a Trustee of TY Danjuma Foundation.

== Politics ==
Ehanire was appointed as a delegate of Congress for Progressive Change (CPC) to the political merger conference that gave birth to the All Progressive Congress (APC), the name which he coined. As the Edo State Coordinator for the Buhari Support Organisation (BSO), he was a key player in ensuring the victory of President Muhammadu Buhari at the 2015 presidential election. In October 2015, he made the list of ministerial nominees to serve the Buhari led administration. After being screened and cleared by the National Assembly, he was appointed as the Minister of State for Health in November 2015.

Following the beginning of a new administration in May 2019 and the submission of the ministerial nominees to the Senate by the Presidency in July 2019 and subsequent screening, Ehanire was appointed the Minister of Health in August 2019.

== Other activities ==
- Partnership for Maternal, Newborn & Child Health (PMNCH), Member of the Board

== Personal life ==
He is married to Dr. Eleanor Neal-Ehanire, an Ear Nose and Throat surgeon and they have 7 children.

== Award ==
In October 2022, a Nigerian national honour of Commander of the Order of the Niger (CON) was conferred on him by President Muhammadu Buhari.

== See also ==
- Cabinet of Nigeria
