= Ladipo Akinkugbe =

Nigerian professor of medicine

Ladipo Akinkugbe OFR, OON

Vice Chancellor of University of Ilorin
- In office 1975–1978

Vice-chancellor of Ahmadu Bello University, Zaria
- In office 1978–1979

Pro- Chancellor of University of Port Harcourt
- In office 1986–1990

Personal details
- Born: Oladipo Olujimi Akinkugbe; 17 July 1933
- Died: 15 May 2020 (aged 86)
- Citizenship: Nigeria
- Education: University of Ibadan; University of London; Balliol College, Oxford University; King's College London
- Profession: Nephrologist, Academic, Researcher

Oladipo Olujimi Akinkugbe (17 July 1933 – 15 May 2020) popularly known as Baba or Prof was the first Nigerian professor of medicine at the University of Ibadan. He specialised in hypertension and nephrology. He was a former chairman of the Joint Admissions and Matriculation Board (JAMB), former vice chancellor of Ahmadu Bello University, Zaria and the foundation Vice Chancellor of the University of Ilorin.

== Early life and education ==
Ladipo Akinkugbe was born on 17 July 1933 to the house of Akinkugbe in Ondo state. He obtained his first degree in medicine from the University College Ibadan and University of London in 1958 and did his internship at the London Hospital and King's College Hospital, London. In 1960, he obtained a Diploma in Tropical Medicine from the University of Liverpool. In 1961, he obtained Membership of the Royal Colleges of Physicians of the United Kingdom diploma and proceeded to Balliol College in Oxford University for his D.Phil. in 1962, he studied the role of angiotensin in hypertension and obtained the degree in 1964. In 1968, he obtained his professional Medical Degree from King's College of London based on his thesis titled "Observations on High Blood Pressure in the West African".

== Career ==
Akinkugbe returned to Nigeria in 1961 and worked with Government Specialist Hospital, Adeoyo, Ibadan. He went back to England to further his studies and later returned to Nigeria in 1965. He became Professor of Medicine at the age of 35 in 1968, the Dean of the Faculty of Medicine of the University of Ibadan in 1970 and head of department in 1972 In 1975, he was a visiting professor of medicine at the Harvard University, University of Oxford in 1981 and University of Cape Town in 1985. In 1997, he became an emeritus professor.

== Administrative appointments ==
He became the pioneer vice chancellor of the University of Ilorin in 1975 to 1978. In the same year, he was appointed the 4th Vice-chancellor of Ahmadu Bello University, Zaria. Between 2000 and 2003, he was the chairman of Joint Admissions and Matriculation Board. (JAMB)

== Personal life ==
Ladipo Akinkugbe married Folasade Akinkugbe (1938–2023) and they had two children.

== Awards and honours ==
Ladipo Akinkugbe received the Commander of the order of the Niger in 1979, Officer de l'Ordre National de la Republique de Côte d'Ivoire in 1981, Searle Distinguished Research Award in 1989, Nigerian National Order of Merit in 1997, Boehringer Ingelheim Award from the International Society of Hypertension and Commander of the Order of the Federal Republic of Nigeria were received by him in 2004. He was also honored with D.Sc. in seven Universities. In 2020, he received the International Society of Nephrology's pioneer award.

== Fellowships and memberships ==
In 1968, he became a Fellow of the Royal College of Physicians (FRCP). In 1980, he became a Fellow of the West African College of Physicians and a Fellow of the Nigerian Academy of Science. He was the pioneer president of the Nigerian Association of Nephrology (NAN) and the Nigerian Hypertension Society. He was also the pioneer fellow of the Nigerian Academy of Medicine

== Selected publications ==
- Akinkugbe, O. O. (1990). Epidemiology of cardiovascular disease in developing countries. Journal of hypertension. Supplement: official journal of the International Society of Hypertension, 8(7), S233-8.
- Akinkugbe, O. O., Nicholson, G. D., & Cruickshank, J. K. (1991). Heart disease in blacks of Africa and the Caribbean. Cardiovascular clinics, 21(3), 377–391.
- Akinkugbe, O. O., & Ojo, O. A. (1969). Arterial pressures in rural and urban populations in Nigeria. British medical journal, 2(5651), 222.
- Akinkugbe, O. O., & Ojo, A. O. (1968). The systemic blood pressure in a rural Nigerian population. Tropical and geographical medicine, 20(4), 347–56.
- Akinkugbe, O. O., Lewis, E. A., Montefiore, D., & Okubadejo, O. A. (1968). Trimethoprim and sulphamethoxazole in typhoid. British Medical Journal, 3(5620), 721.
- Akinkugbe, O. O. (1978). Nephrology in the tropical setting. Nephron, 22(1–3), 249–252.
- Akinkugbe, O. O., Akinkugbe, F. M., Ayeni, O., Solomon, H., French, K., & Minear, R. (1977). Biracial study of arterial pressures in the first and second decades of life. British Medical Journal, 1(6069), 1132.
- Akinkugbe, O. O. (1968). The rarity of hypertensive retinopathy in the African. The American journal of medicine, 45(3), 401–404.
- Akinkugbe, O. O. (1996). The Nigerian hypertension programme. Journal of human hypertension, 10, S43-6.
