= Emmanuel Nyong Nsan =

Nigerian medical professional and politician (1947–2024)

Emmanuel Nyong Nsan OFR

Minister of Health
- In office 1984–1985
- President: Muhammadu Buhari

Minister of Works and Housing
- In office 1984–1984
- President: Muhammadu Buhari

Personal details
- Born: July 14, 1947 Calabar, Cross River State, Nigeria
- Died: December 12, 2024 (aged 77) Nigeria
- Occupation: Medical doctor, politician, broadcaster
- Awards: Officer of the Order of the Federal Republic (OFR)

Emmanuel Nyong Nsan OFR (14 July 1947 – 12 December 2024) was a Nigerian medical doctor and politician who served in various federal government roles, including Minister of Works and Housing and Minister of Health during the military regime of General Muhammadu Buhari in the 1980s. He was also a broadcaster, academic, and community leader from Akpabuyo, Cross River State.

== Early life and education ==
Nsan was born on 14 July 1947 in Calabar, Cross River State. He trained in medicine and became a qualified physician before entering public service.

== Career ==
Before his political career, Nsan worked as a broadcaster and later became a medical practitioner. He combined his medical expertise with public communication, hosting weekly health programmes on television and radio.

In 1984, he was appointed Minister of Works and Housing under the military administration of General Muhammadu Buhari. Later that year, he became Minister of Health, where he introduced policies such as the Primary Health Care Policy, which expanded access to basic health services nationwide. He was also involved in early efforts toward a National Health Insurance Scheme.

Beyond ministerial roles, Nsan held various leadership and advisory positions, contributed to infrastructure development such as federal highways and bridges in Cross River State, and was involved with professional and community organisations.

== Personal life and legacy ==
Nsan came from the Obong Nsan ruling family of Ifondo in Akpabuyo and was recognised for his service in both government and community development. He was awarded the Officer of the Order of the Federal Republic (OFR) for his contributions to public service.

== Death ==
Nsan died on 12 December 2024 at the age of 77, following a prolonged illness. His death was announced by his family, and funeral rites were held in Calabar in March 2025.

== See also ==
- Federal Ministry of Health and Social Welfare
