= Angela Miri =

Nigerian academic

- Born: 22 August 1959 (age 67); Plateau State, Nigeria
- Title: Vice-Chancellor

Academic background
- Education: University of Maiduguri, University of Jos

Angela Freeman Miri is a Nigerian Professor who became the Vice Chancellor of Federal University, Lokoja in 2017. She is a professor of English and a published poet also.

== Life ==
Miri did her PhD in English with her specialization in African and English Literatures, Gender Studies and Creative Writing from the University of Jos.

In 2004 Malthouse published a collection of over 40 of her own poems titled "Running Waters and other poems". Professor Angela Freeman Miri has acquired immense administrative and working experiences both within and outside the University System. She has served in various establishments and held various positions of responsibilities which include membership of Plateau State Executive Council, Presidential Task Team on Education and served as the chairperson, Governing Council, Plateau State Polytechnic, Barkin-Ladi, Plateau State. Between 2007 and 2011, Professor Miri was appointed by the Executive Governor of Plateau State as the Honourable Commissioner for Health and due to her outstanding performance and rich experience was subsequently appointed the Honourable Commissioner for Education in Plateau State where she contributed immensely to the upliftment of the standard of education in Nigeria.

She also served as a member of the Jury of the Nigerian Liquefied Natural Gas (NLNG) Literary Competition 2012 In February, 2016, His Excellency the President and Commander-in-Chief of the Armed Forces of the Federal Republic of Nigeria, Muhammadu Buhari GCFR appointed her the Vice-Chancellor of this University - Federal University Lokoja. Prof Angela Freeman Miri's stewardship lasted five years and she completed her tenure on the 15 February 2021.

In 2017 she became the Vice Chancellor of the Federal University, Lokoja.
