= Muhammad Ali Pate =

Nigerian physician and politician (born 1968)

Muhammad Ali Pate OON CON
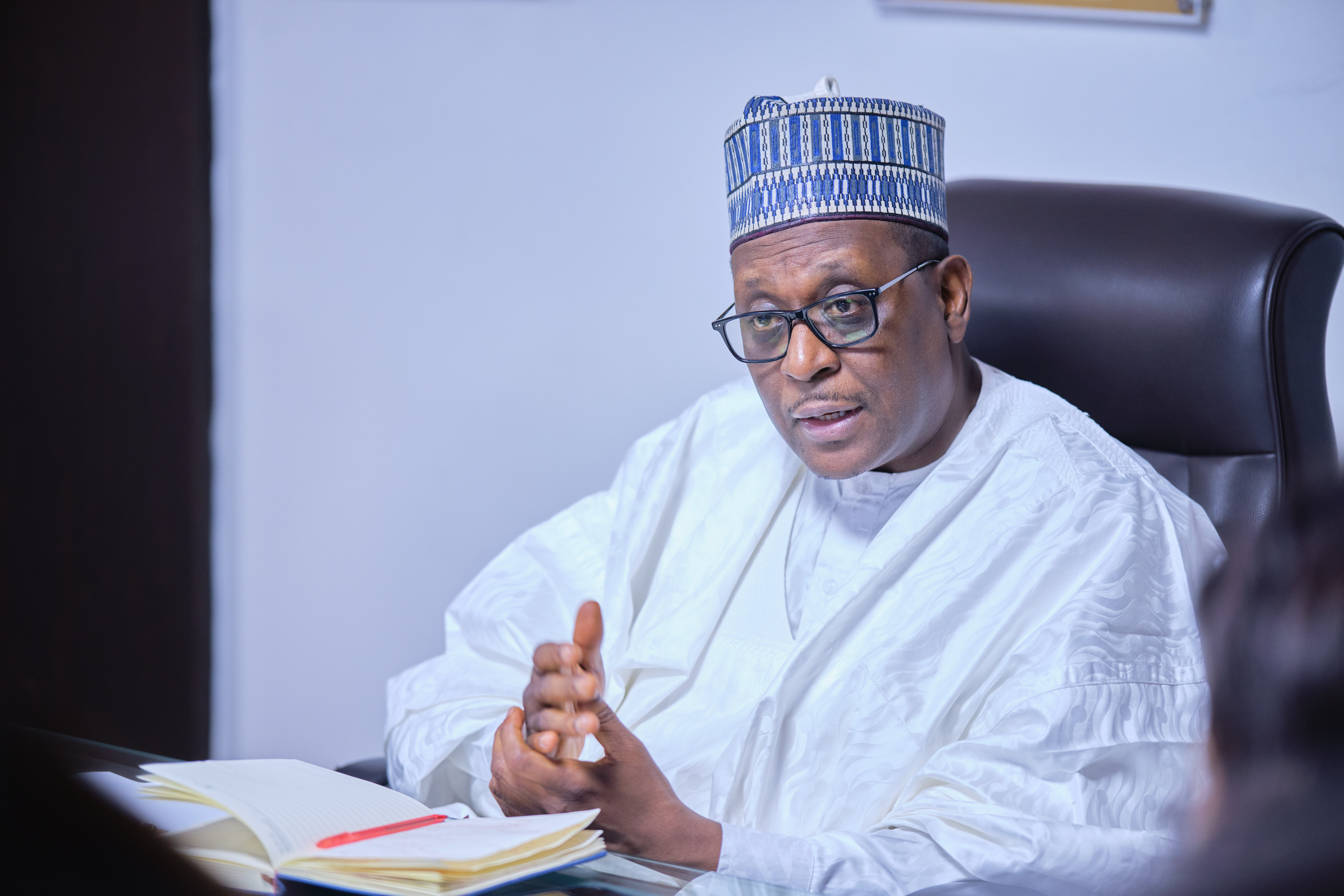
- Nigeria's first-ever Coordinating Minister of Health and Social Welfare

Minister of Health and Social Welfare
- Incumbent
- Assumed office 21 August 2023
- President: Bola Tinubu
- Minister of State: Iziaq Adekunle Salako
- Preceded by: Osagie Ehanire

Minister of State for Health
- In office 14 July 2011 – 23 July 2013
- President: Goodluck Jonathan
- Minister: Onyebuchi Chukwu

Executive Director and Chief Executive Officer of the National Primary Health Care Development Agency of Nigeria
- In office 14 November 2008 – 11 July 2011

Personal details
- Born: 6 September 1968 (age 58) Misau, Northern Region (now in Bauchi State), Nigeria
- Party: All Progressives Congress
- Education: Ahmadu Bello University; University of Rochester Medical Center; Duke University; University College London; London School of Hygiene & Tropical Medicine
- Occupation: Politician; physician

Muhammad Ali Pate (born in September 1968 in Misau, now in Bauchi State) is a Nigerian physician and politician. He is certified by the American Board in Internal Medicine and Infectious Diseases. He was appointed as Nigeria’s first-ever Coordinating Minister of Health and Social Welfare of Nigeria in August 2023. Before taking office, he was a professor of public health leadership in the Department of Global Health and Population at Harvard University. He also served as the director of the Global Financing Facility (GFF) for women, children, and adolescents at the World Bank Group. He worked in various roles across several regions for the World Bank Group beginning in 2000.

== Early life and education ==
Pate was born on 6 September 1968 and was raised in the northern region of Misau, now Bauchi state, Nigeria. After graduating from high school, he enrolled at Ahmadu Bello University in Kaduna State. After earning his medical degree, he moved to The Gambia and worked in rural hospitals. He later became a fellow in infectious diseases at the University of Rochester Medical Center.

Pate studied at University College London, earning a master's degree in Health System Management from the London School of Hygiene & Tropical Medicine, and an MBA with a Health Sector Concentration from Duke University.

== Career ==
Before his appointment to the National Primary Health Care Development Agency (NPHCDA) in 2008, Pate had a 10-year career at the World Bank, where he led health sector reform programs in Africa, East Asia, and other regions. He held senior positions, such as Senior Health Specialist, Human Development Sector Coordinator for the East Asia/Pacific Region, and Senior Health Specialist for the African Region. He initiated a public-private partnership to replace a national referral hospital in Lesotho.

Pate served as the Executive Director of Nigeria's National Primary Health Care Development Agency, and was later appointed as Nigeria's Minister of State for Health in July 2011. He resigned on 24 July 2013 to take up a professorship at Duke University Global Health Institute. He later served as the Chief Executive Officer of Big Win Philanthropy and as the Global Director for Health, Nutrition, and Population.

In October 2022, Pate was conferred the title Commander of the Order of the Niger (CON) by then-President Muhammadu Buhari, alongside 447 other Nigerians. In February 2023, he became the CEO of the Global Alliance for Vaccines and Immunization (GAVI).

== Minister of Health and Social Welfare ==
President Bola Ahmed Tinubu appointed Pate in August 2023 as Nigeria's Coordinating Minister of Health and Social Welfare. During his tenure, Pate has announced initiatives related to healthcare delivery and social welfare programs. His tenure has focused on addressing healthcare accessibility and social welfare challenges, especially in light of Nigeria's population of more than 220 million . Pate's policies have addressed issues including healthcare accessibility, poverty, and literacy.

Pate has overseen changes at the National Health Insurance Authority of Nigeria, including efforts to expand coverage and lower healthcare costs. In 2023 and 2024, he oversaw the extension of basic healthcare provisions, distributing 45,900,000,000 naira to 8,800 Primary Healthcare Centers (PHC), expanding the malaria vaccine (RTSS) rollout, and improving immunization and maternal health programs in rural Nigerian PHCs. These policies have improved maternal health across 172 local government areas of Nigeria and advanced primary healthcare sustainability through domestic financing and private-sector partnerships. Pate has also introduced programs focused on community health engagement and social welfare integration.

== Partisan Politics ==
Pate contested Bauchi State governorship under the PRP in 2019 general election. He scored a total of 46,326 votes. He lost a bid to win 2022 APC governorship primary to Air Marshal Sadique Baba Abubakar. In May 2026, Pate announced that he would not run for governor of Bauchi state in the 2027 election. He said he intended to remain involved in the political process and support candidates who emerged from the party primaries.

== Recognition's and awards ==
Among several national and international accolades he has received for his contributions to the health sector in Nigeria, Pate was included in Time magazine's "100 Health 2025" list, where he was recognised for shaping Nigeria's healthcare system.

Life Blessing

Ali Pate in company of President Bola Ahmed Tinubu were allowed entry into the Holy Ka'aba along side other delegation on the 2 November 2026.

In 2012, the Harvard Ministerial Leadership Program awarded him the title of Harvard Health Leader. He holds the traditional title of Chigari (or Knight) in Misau.

== Recent publications ==
- Nkengasong, John N.; Raji, Tajudeen; Ferguson, Stephanie L.; Pate, Muhammad A.; Williams, Michelle A. (10 June 2021). "Nursing leadership in Africa and health security". eClinicalMedicine. 36 100930. doi:10.1016/j.eclinm.2021.100930. PMC 8207179. PMID 34169244.
- Bali, Sulzhan; Stewart, Kearsley A; Pate, Muhammad Ali (9 November 2016). "Long shadow of fear in an epidemic: fearonomic effects of Ebola on the private sector in Nigeria". BMJ Global Health. 1 (3) e000111. doi:10.1136/bmjgh-2016-000111. PMC 5321397. PMID 28588965.
- Moon, Suerie; Sridhar, Devi; Pate, Muhammad A; Jha, Ashish K.; Clinton, Chelsea; Delaunay, Sophie; Edwin, Valnora; Fallah, Mosoka; Fidler, David P.; Garrett, Laurie; Goosby, Eric; Gostin, Lawrence O; Heymann, David L; Lee, Kelley; Leung, Gabriel M.; Morrison, J Stephen; Saavedra, Jorge; Tanner, Marcel; Leigh, Jennifer A.; Hawkins, Benjamin; Woskie, Liana R; Piot, Peter (2015). "Will Ebola change the game? Ten essential reforms before the next pandemic. The report of the Harvard-LSHTM Independent Panel on the Global Response to Ebola". The Lancet. 386 (10009): 2204–2221. doi:10.1016/S0140-6736(15)00946-0. PMC 7137174. PMID 26615326.
- Okoli, Ugo; Morris, Laura; Oshin, Adetokunbo; Pate, Muhammad A.; Aigbe, Chidimma; Muhammad, Ado (12 December 2014). "Conditional cash transfer schemes in Nigeria: potential gains for maternal and child health service uptake in a national pilot programme". BMC Pregnancy and Childbirth. 14 408. doi:10.1186/s12884-014-0408-9. PMC 4273319. PMID 25495258.
- Abubakar, Ibrahim; Dalglish, Sarah L.; Angell, Blake; Sanuade, Olutobi; Abimbola, Seye; Adamu, Aishatu Lawal; Adetifa, Ifedayo M. O.; Colbourn, Tim; Ogunlesi, Afolabi Olaniyi; Onwujekwe, Obinna; Owoaje, Eme T.; Okeke, Iruka N.; Adeyemo, Adebowale; Aliyu, Gambo; Aliyu, Muktar H; Aliyu, Sani Hussaini; Ameh, Emmanuel A.; Archibong, Belinda; Ezeh, Alex; Gadanya, Muktar A.; Ihekweazu, Chikwe; Ihekweazu, Vivianne; Iliyasu, Zubairu; Kwaku Chiroma, Aminatu; Mabayoje, Diana A.; Nasir Sambo, Mohammed; Obaro, Stephen; Yinka-Ogunleye, Adesola; Okonofua, Friday; Oni, Tolu; Onyimadu, Olu; Pate, Muhammad Ali; Salako, Babatunde L.; Shuaib, Faisal; Tsiga-Ahmed, Fatimah; Zanna, Fatima H (19 March 2022). "The Lancet Nigeria Commission: investing in health and the future of the nation". The Lancet. 399 (10330): 1155–1200. doi:10.1016/S0140-6736(21)02488-0. PMC 8943278. PMID 35303470.
- Wood, Stacy; Pate, Muhammad Ali; Schulman, Kevin (14 October 2021). "Novel strategies to support global promotion of COVID-19 vaccination". BMJ Global Health. 6 (10) e006066. doi:10.1136/bmjgh-2021-006066. PMC 8521672. PMID 34649869.
- Swaminathan, Soumya; Sheikh, Kabir; Marten, Robert; Taylor, Martin; Jhalani, Manoj; Chukwujekwu, Ogochukwu; Pearson, Luwei; Allotey, Pascale; Gough, Jean; Scherpbier, Robert W.; Gupta, Anuradha; Wijnroks, Marijke; Pate, Muhammad Ali; Sorgho, Gaston; Levine, Orin; Goodyear-Smith, Felicity; Sundararaman, Thiagarajan; Montenegro, Hernan; Dalil, Suraya; Ghaffar, Abdul (18 December 2020). "Embedded research to advance primary health care". BMJ Global Health. 5 (12) e004684. doi:10.1136/bmjgh-2020-004684. PMC 7751205. PMID 33355263.
- Yamey, Gavin; Schäferhoff, Marco; Hatchett, Richard; Pate, Muhammad; Zhao, Feng; McDade, Kaci Kennedy (2020). "Ensuring global access to COVID-19 vaccines". The Lancet. 395 (10234): 1405–1406. doi:10.1016/S0140-6736(20)30763-7. PMC 7271264. PMID 32243778.
- Kruk, Margaret E.; Gage, Anna D; Arsenault, Catherine; Jordan, Keely; Leslie, Hannah H.; Roder-DeWan, Sanam; Adeyi, Olusoji; Barker, Pierre; Daelmans, Bernadette; Doubova, Svetlana V.; English, Mike; Elorrio, Ezequiel García; Guanais, Frederico; Gureje, Oye; Hirschhorn, Lisa R.; Jiang, Lixin; Kelley, Edward; Lemango, Ephrem Tekle; Liljestrand, Jerker; Malata, Address; Marchant, Tanya; Matsoso, Malebona Precious; Meara, John G; Mohanan, Manoj; Ndiaye, Youssoupha; Norheim, Ole F; Reddy, K Srinath; Rowe, Alexander K; Salomon, Joshua A; Thapa, Gagan; Twum-Danso, Nana A Y; Pate, Muhammad (2018). "High-quality health systems in the Sustainable Development Goals era: time for a revolution". The Lancet. Global Health. 6 (11): e1196–e1252. doi:10.1016/S2214-109X(18)30386-3. PMC 7734391. PMID 30196093.
- Upfill-Brown, Alexander M.; Lyons, Hil M.; Pate, Muhammad A.; Shuaib, Faisal; Baig, Shahzad; Hu, Hao; Eckhoff, Philip A; Chabot-Couture, Guillaume (4 June 2014). "Predictive spatial risk model of poliovirus to aid prioritization and hasten eradication in Nigeria". BMC Medicine. 12 92. doi:10.1186/1741-7015-12-92. PMC 4066838. PMID 24894345.
- Tulenko, Kate; Møgedal, Sigrun; Afzal, Muhammad Mahmood; Frymus, Diana; Oshin, Adetokunbo; Pate, Muhammad; Quain, Estelle; Pinel, Arletty; Wynd, Shona; Zodpey, Sanjay (1 November 2013). "Community health workers for universal health-care coverage: from fragmentation to synergy". Bulletin of the World Health Organization. 91 (11): 847–852. doi:10.2471/BLT.13.118745. PMC 3853952. PMID 24347709.
- Gupta, Neeru; Maliqi, Blerta; França, Adson; Nyonator, Frank; Pate, Muhammad A.; Sanders, David; Belhadj, Hedia; Daelmans, Bernadette (24 June 2011). "Human resources for maternal, newborn and child health: from measurement and planning to performance for improved health outcomes". Human Resources for Health. 9 16. doi:10.1186/1478-4491-9-16. PMC 3157412. PMID 21702913.
- Abimbola, Seye; Okoli, Ugo; Olubajo, Olalekan; Abdullahi, Mohammed J.; Pate, Muhammad A. (1 May 2012). "The Midwives Service Scheme in Nigeria". PLOS Medicine. 9 (5) e1001211. doi:10.1371/journal.pmed.1001211. PMC 3341343. PMID 22563303.
- Gupta, Neeru; Maliqi, Blerta; França, Adson; Nyonator, Frank; Pate, Muhammad A.; Sanders, David; Belhadj, Hedia; Daelmans, Bernadette (December 2011). "Human resources for maternal, newborn and child health: from measurement and planning to performance for improved health outcomes". Human Resources for Health. 9 (1): 16. doi:10.1186/1478-4491-9-16. PMC 3157412. PMID 21702913. Gale A265232619.
- Pate, Muhammad Ali; Gyapong, John O.; Dowdle, Walter R.; Hopkins, Adrian; Hozumi, Dairiku; Malecela, Mwelecele; Tyson, Stewart (2011). "Group Report: Designing Elimination or Eradication Initiatives that Interface Effectively with Health Systems". Disease Eradication in the 21st Century. pp. 273–286. doi:10.7551/mitpress/9780262016735.003.0019. ISBN 978-0-262-01673-5.
- Wassilak, Steven; Pate, Muhammad Ali; Wannemuehler, Kathleen; Jenks, Julie; Burns, Cara; Chenoweth, Paul; Abanida, Emmanuel Ade; Adu, Festus; Baba, Marycelin; Gasasira, Alex; Iber, Jane; Mkanda, Pascal; Williams, A. J.; Shaw, Jing; Pallansch, Mark; Kew, Olen (1 April 2011). "Outbreak of Type 2 Vaccine-Derived Poliovirus in Nigeria: Emergence and Widespread Circulation in an Underimmunized Population". The Journal of Infectious Diseases. 203 (7): 898–909. doi:10.1093/infdis/jiq140. JSTOR 41151031. PMC 3068031. PMID 21402542.
- Jenkins, Helen E.; Aylward, R. Bruce; Gasasira, Alex; Donnelly, Christl A.; Mwanza, Michael; Corander, Jukka; Garnier, Sandra; Chauvin, Claire; Abanida, Emmanuel; Pate, Muhammad Ali; Adu, Festus; Baba, Marycelin; Grassly, Nicholas C. (24 June 2010). "Implications of a Circulating Vaccine-Derived Poliovirus in Nigeria". New England Journal of Medicine. 362 (25): 2360–2369. doi:10.1056/nejmoa0910074. PMID 20573924.

== Book chapters and technical reports ==
- Baris, E., Silverman, R., Wang, H., Zhao, F., Pate, M., Walking the Talk: Reimagining Primary Healthcare in the post-COVID-19 era. Published by the World Bank, April 2022.
- Liam Donaldson, Thomas Frieden, Susan Goldstein, Muhammad Pate. Every virus. 17th Report of the Independent Monitoring Board (IMB) of the Global Polio Eradication Initiative (GPEI). June 2021.
- Liam Donaldson, Thomas Frieden, Susan Goldstein, Muhammad Pate. Every virus. 16th Report of the Independent Monitoring Board (IMB) of the Global Polio Eradication Initiative (GPEI). June 2019.
- Liam Donaldson, Thomas Frieden, Susan Goldstein, Muhammad Pate. Every virus. 15th Report of the Independent Monitoring Board (IMB) of the Global Polio Eradication Initiative (GPEI). June 2018.
- Liam Donaldson, Thomas Frieden, Susan Goldstein, Muhammad Pate. Every virus. 14th Report of the Independent Monitoring Board (IMB) of the Global Polio Eradication Initiative (GPEI). June 2017.
- Emmanuel Jimenez and Muhammad Pate. Reaping a Demographic Dividend in Africa's Largest Country: Nigeria. In: Hans Groth & John F. May, eds. "Africa's Population: In Search of a Demographic Dividend", Dordrecht: Springer Publishers, 2017 (ISBN 978-3-319-46887-7).
- Muhammad Pate. Contributor to "The Art and Science of Delivery": McKinsey's Voices on Society, Published in 2013 in honor of the 10th Anniversary of the Skoll World Forum.
- Pate, Muhammad Ali; Gyapong, John O.; Dowdle, Walter R.; Hopkins, Adrian; Hozumi, Dairiku; Malecela, Mwelecele; Tyson, Stewart (2011). "Group Report: Designing Elimination or Eradication Initiatives that Interface Effectively with Health Systems". Disease Eradication in the 21st Century. pp. 273–286. doi:10.7551/mitpress/9780262016735.003.0019. ISBN 978-0-262-01673-5.
- Pate, Muhammad Ali; Schoppig, Joel (2012). "Africa's Growing Giant – Population Dynamics in Nigeria". Population Dynamics in Muslim Countries. pp. 211–224. doi:10.1007/978-3-642-27881-5_13. ISBN 978-3-642-27880-8.
- Pate M.A., Beeharry G., Abramson W. Improving health care access for the poor: A case study of the Washington, D.C. public health care reforms. Presented at the 4th Europe and the Americas conference on health sector reforms, February 2002, Malaga, Spain.
