= Muhammed Babandede =

Nigerian politician

Comptroller-General of Nigeria Immigration Service
- In office May 2016 – September 2021
- Preceded by: Martin Abeshi
- Succeeded by: Idris Isah Jere

Personal details
- Born: Jigawa, Nigeria

Muhammed Babandede born in Jigawa State, Nigeria in 1963 is a former Comptroller General (CG) of the Nigeria Immigration Service NIS, before his appointment by President Mohammadu Buhari, he was the Deputy Comptroller General (DCG) of NIS, Operations & Passports.

Babandede holds a Bachelor of Arts degree in History and Islamic Studies, he has master's degree in Law Enforcement and Criminal Justice at the Ahmadu Bello University, ABU Zaria.

He served as Assistant Comptroller General ACG passport at the Immigration Headquarters. His appointment came after President Mohammadu Buhari sacked the former Immigration boss Martin Abeshi.

Babandede has an award of Member of the Order of the Federal Republic, MFR, in 2014. He is currently the longest service NIS top officer.

Babandede tested positive for COVID-19 after returning from the United Kingdom on 22 March 2020.
