= Kemi Nanna Nandap =

Nigerian government official

Kemi Nandap
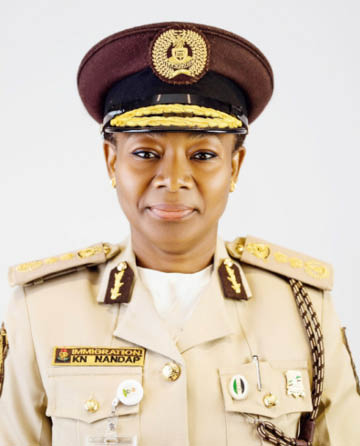

Comptroller-General of Nigeria Immigration Service
- Incumbent
- Assumed office March 2024
- Preceded by: Adepoju Carol Wura-Ola

Chairperson of ECOWAS Heads of Immigration Forum
- Incumbent
- Assumed office September 2024

Deputy Comptroller-General
- In office 2022–2024

Assistant Comptroller-General
- In office 2021–2022

Personal details
- Born: Kemi Nanna Nandap; 3 June 1966 (age 60) Zaria, Kaduna State, Nigeria
- Education: University of Ilorin

Kemi Nandap (born 3 June 1966) is a Nigerian government official who is the Comptroller-General of the Nigeria Immigration Service. She was appointed by president Bola Tinubu on 20 January 2024.

== Early life and education ==
Kemi Nanna Nandap was born on 3 June 1966 in Zaria, Kaduna State with roots in Ogun State. She attended Corona Primary School, Jos and Therbow Primary School, Zaria for her first school leaving certificate. Nandap attended St. John's College, Jos and Yejide Girls' Grammar School, Ibadan, Oyo State for her secondary school leaving certificate.

Nandap holds a Bachelor of Science degree in Biochemistry from the University of Ilorin. She also earned a Master of Science in International Relations and Strategic Studies from the University of Jos, as well as an MBA from the University of Abuja.

== Career ==
Nandap joined the Nigeria Immigration Service (NIS) in 1989 as an Assistant Superintendent. She completed training at the Immigration Training School in Kano and the Immigration Command and Staff College in 2016. Over the course of her career, she has held various positions within the NIS across Nigeria, including roles at the Murtala Muhammed International Airport Command and Zone F Headquarters. Nandap was promoted to Assistant Comptroller-General and later to Deputy Comptroller-General, overseeing the Migration Directorate. In these roles, she worked on issues related to human trafficking, smuggling, and international migration cooperation.

In December 2023, she was appointed to lead the Passport and Other Travel Documents Directorate, where she oversaw the implementation of a reform to modernize Nigeria’s passport system.

In 2024, Nandap was appointed Comptroller General of the Nigeria Immigration Service (NIS). Her tenure has focused on incorporating technology into immigration processes, including the e-Border Solution Project, the deployment of Advance Passenger Information System (APIS), passenger name record (PNR) systems, the installation of e-Gates at airports, and the automation of visa issuance and passport processing.
