= Bamidele A. Ojo =

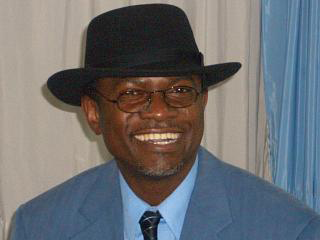
- Born: April 7, 1960 (age 66); Ibadan, Nigeria
- Education: Obafemi Awolowo University; Institut d'études politiques (IEP) de Bordeaux; University of Nottingham
- Website: alpha.fdu.edu/~ojo

Bamidele Adesegun Ojo (born April 7, 1960) is a Nigerian and American political scientist, author and professor emeritus of political science and international studies at Fairleigh Dickinson University, Teaneck, New Jersey, USA.

== Education ==
Ojo holds B.Sc, M.Sc., M.Phil, LLM, and Ph.D.degrees. He received his degrees; a B.Sc in Political Science, an M.Sc in International Relations and Diploma in French from the University of Ife, Nigeria (now Obafemi Awolowo University); An M.phil (DEA) in African Studies and a PhD in Political Science from the University of Bordeaux 1 in France; An LLM in international Law from the University of Nottingham, England and a DIHL in International Humanitarian law, among other degrees.

== Career ==
Ojo's areas of expertise include African politics, geography and world issues, globalization, human rights, international law, international relations, political violence, and terrorism. He is actively involved in Nigerian politics and was appointed by President Obasanjo as the chairman of the Governing Council of the Michael Imodu National Institute for labour studies (2005–2006) and appointed by former Nigerian President Yar'Adua as member of the National Institute for Trypanosomiasis Research in 2009. A Fulbright senior scholar for teaching and research at the University of Lagos in 2001-2002, Adesegun Ojo was a governorship aspirant in Ekiti state, Nigeria in 2003 and 2006 under the Nigerian ruling party, The Peoples Democratic Party (PDP).

Ojo was also a member of the Nigerian national delegation to the annual conference of the International Labour Organization in Geneva, Switzerland in June 2006.

== Selected publications ==
- ECOWAS and Democratic Consolidation in West Africa: Praetorian Resurgence as a Failure of Democratic Process" (2012), African Renaissance (1744-2532);2012, Vol. 9 Issue 2, p33
- "Transformative Online Education & Social Equality: The Prospects for E-Governance and Democracy in Africa" in Handbook of Research on Transformative Online Education and Liberation: Models for Social Equality Gulsun Kurubacak and T. Volkan Yuzer (2010)
- "Obama and Africa: Understanding the Framework for President Obama’s Foreign Policy in Africa” African Renaissance, Volume 7, Number 1, 2010
- "E-LEARNING AND THE GLOBAL DIVIDE: The Challenges Facing Distance Education in Africa" (2009), The Turkish Online Journal of Distance Education 01/2009;
- “Africa’s Triple Dilemma: The State, Democratization and the Challenges of Globalization”.Globalization, 4:2 (October 2004)
- Contemporary African Politics : A Comparative Study of Political Transition to Democratic Legitimacy (1999) (Ed) (Lanham, MD: University Press of America)
- Human Rights and the New World Order : University, Acceptability and Human Diversity (1997) (New York: Nova publ.)
- "La Namibie: Vers l'independance" (1989), Annee Africaine (CEAN/Edition Pedone, Paris.France

== Selected Panel discussions and interviews ==
- China Radio International (CRI), Political Crisis in Nigeria (2013-09-26)
- China Radio International (CRI), The Latest Situation in Nigeria (2012-01-03)
- China Radio International (CRI), Nigeria in Post Election Violence (2011-06-06)
- The Evening Edition, a Newstalk93fm radio discussion program in Kingston, Jamaica, with hosts Prudence Kidd Deans & Garnett Roper July 30, 2009
