= Onyebuchi Chukwu =

Nigerian politician

Prof. Onyebuchi Chukwu
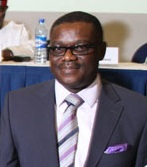

Minister of Health
- In office April 27, 2010 – October 20, 2014
- Preceded by: Professor Babatunde Osotimehin
- Succeeded by: Haliru Alhassan
- Constituency: Afikpo North

Personal details
- Born: 22 April 1962 (age 64) Yaba, Lagos, Nigeria
- Children: Chinyere, Ezeogo, Amarachi, Chinedu
- Education: University of Lagos
- Profession: Orthopedic and Trauma Surgeon
- Committees: Ebola eradication 2014
- Website: www.onyebuchichukwu.net

Onyebuchi Chukwu (born 22 April 1962) is a Nigerian politician who served as Minister of Health from 2010 to 2014.

== Early life and education ==
Chukwu was born in Yaba, Lagos, Nigeria. After attending the Federal Government College, Sokoto, Chukwu trained as a medical doctor at the College of Medicine of the University of Lagos, graduating in 1986. Subsequently, he obtained post-graduate qualification in orthopaedic surgery from the West African Postgraduate Medical College.

== Academic career ==
He is a fellow of the West African College of Surgeons and a fellow of the International College of Surgeons. He is an international affiliate and a member of the American Academy of Orthopaedic Surgeons and a member of the Société Internationale de Chirurgie Orthopédique et de Traumatologie (SICOT).

He served as the Chief Medical Director/Chief Executive Officer of the Ebonyi State University Teaching Hospital, Abakaliki from 2003 to 2008. In 2007, he was appointed Professor of Orthopaedic Surgery at the Ebonyi State University, Abakaliki, Nigeria, and visiting Professor of Surgery at the University of Nigeria, Enugu Campus in 2010.

Chukwu was the Minister of Health who led Nigeria's successful fight against the Ebola virus disease outbreak. He is a member of the Board of the Partnership for Maternal, Newborn and Child Health. He served as the Chairman of the Country Coordinating Mechanism (Nigeria) of the Global Fund to Fight AIDS, Tuberculosis and Malaria (GFATM), the West and Central African Constituency Representative on the Board of the GFATM; and the Chairman of the Bureau of Ministers of Health of the African Union (CAMH6).

== Political career ==
Chukwu was first appointed Minister of Health of the Federal Republic of Nigeria by President Goodluck Jonathan, in April 2010 and re-appointed in June 2011. As Minister of Health, he championed the transformation agenda of the president in the health sector with considerable success. He ensured the approval of the National Strategic Health Development Plan (NSHDP) by the Federal Executive Council and the signing of the International Health Partnership (IHP+) compact securing partners' commitment to the implementation of the plan. He later resigned in October 2014, to run as a candidate for the governorship of Ebonyi State, Nigeria.

During his term, Guinea worm disease was eradicated in Nigeria, and in December 2013, the WHO certified Nigeria as a Guinea worm-free country. It was also during his term that Nigeria was declared Ebola-free by WHO Regional Office for Africa, following a successful response to the Ebola virus outbreak in the country.

== Later career ==
Since 2020, Chukwu has been a member of the Global Leaders Group on Antimicrobial Resistance, co-chaired by Sheikh Hasina and Mia Mottley.
