= Abideen Olasupo =

Nigerian entrepreneur

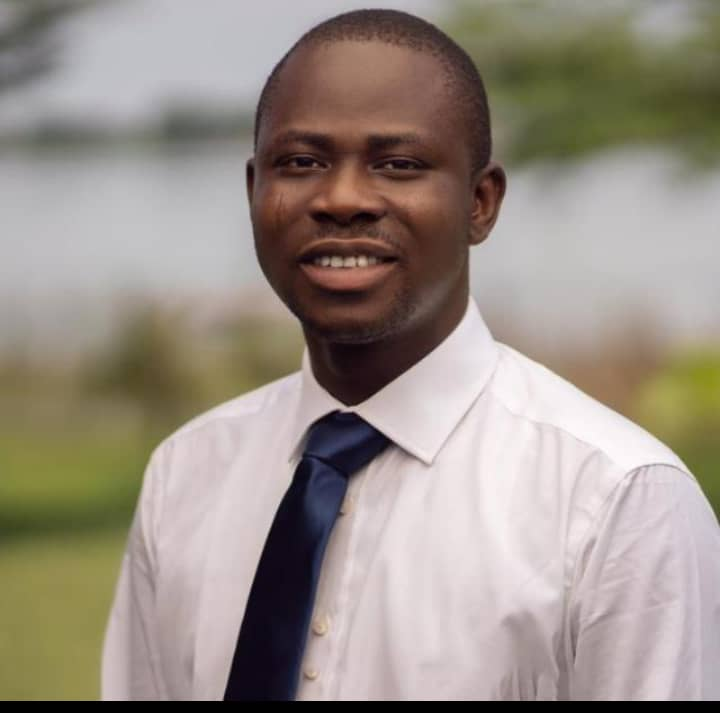
- Born: 17 October 1993 (age 33); Ifon, Osun State
- Occupation: SDGs activist

Olasupo Abideen Opeyemi (born 17 October 1993) in Ifon, Osun State, is a Nigerian entrepreneur, founder of OPAB Gas and Brain Builders Youth Development Initiative (BBYDI). He is an SDGs advocate.

Olasupo Abideen was invited by the UN to speak at its 2023 Economic and Social Council (ECOSOC) Youth Forum speaking on the topic of "Strengthening the Trust of Youth in Multilateralism: Exploring Intergenerational and Peer-to-Peer Dialogue. He was also named among the young activists who would speak at the UNGASS's virtual Youth Forum on the issues and solutions for preventing and combating corruption as well as fostering global cooperation.

== Education ==
He received his primary and secondary education at Grace Nursery and Primary School, Ilobu, and Al-Mansoor Model College, respectively. He had his tertiary education in the University of Ilorin where he bagged a degree in chemistry.

== Career ==
Olasupo is the founder and executive director of the Brain Builders Youth Development Initiative. Also, he is a member of the Global Goals Youth Panel. He advocated for the SDGs to be translated into regional languages. Currently, he is organizing community activists to meet with stakeholders in all 774 LGAs in an effort to aid in the localization and, most importantly, the achievement of the SDGs. Mr Olasupo was the lead campaigner for youth participation in elections in Nigeria, especially in Kwara State, North-central region.

In 2020, he launched a dedicated platform, Know COVID-19 Nigeria, to combat fake news and misinformation about COVID-19 during the pandemic in Nigeria. In January 2022, he introduced FactCheckAfrica, a platform aimed at verifying election reports and government-related claims on projects. Olasupo is one of the participants selected from 12 countries for the 2025 AI Journalism Lab Leadership Cohort, hosted by the Craig Newmark Graduate School of Journalism at the City University of New York (CUNY), United States.
