= Johnson Bamidele Olawumi =

Nigerian army general (born 1964)

Major general Johnson Bamidele Olawumi

Commandant, Nigerian Army School of Electrical and Mechanical Engineering
- In office 13 April 2016 – 2021

Director-General, National Youth Service Corps
- In office 23 December 2013 – 12 April 2016
- Preceded by: Brig-Gen. Nnamdi Okorie-Affia
- Succeeded by: Brig-Gen. Suleiman Kazaure

Personal details
- Born: 20 November 1964 (age 62) Iyin Ekiti, Western Region, Nigeria (now in Ekiti State, Nigeria)
- Children: 3
- Education: Nigerian Defence Academy; University of Ilorin; University of London

Military service
- Allegiance: Nigeria
- Branch/service: Nigerian Army
- Years of service: 1984–2021
- Rank: Major general

Johnson Bamidele Olawumi (born 20 November 1964) is a retired Nigerian army major general and former Director General of the National Youth Service Corps. He was Coordinator, Nigerian Army Aviation, Director, Cyber Security at the Defence Space Agency, Commandant at the Nigerian Army School of Electrical and Mechanical Engineering. Prior to his appointment as the DG NYSC, he was the Principal Staff Officer to the then Chief of Army Staff, Lieutenant General Azubuike Ihejirika.

== Background ==
Olawumi was born in Iyin Ekiti, a town in Ekiti State, Southwestern Nigeria. He attended primary school at the Army Children School, Mokola in Ibadan, he then proceeded to CAC Grammar School, Akure in Ondo State where he obtained the West African School Certificate. He was enlisted into the Nigerian Defence Academy on 24 September 1984 and was commissioned as a second lieutenant into the Nigerian Army on 23 September 1989. He obtained a bachelor's degree in mathematics from the Nigerian Defence Academy in 1988 and a master's degree in mechanical engineering from the University of Ilorin in 1997. He proceeded to University of London, where he received a master's degree in defence studies in 2006.

== Military career ==
He was enlisted into the Nigerian Defence Academy on 24 September 1984 and was commissioned as a second lieutenant into the Corps of Nigerian army on 23 September 1989. In 1992, he was promoted to the rank of captain, and five years later, to the rank of major. In 2002, he attained the rank of lieutenant colonel. In 2007, he was promoted to the rank of colonel, and in 2012, he attained the rank of brigadier general. In 2011, he was appointed deputy director, Department of Logistics, Army headquarters Department of Policy and Plans. On 23 December 2013, he was appointed director-general of the National Youth Service Corps by president Goodluck Jonathan

On 9 December 2016, he was promoted to the rank of Major General.
