= Nigeria Immigration Service =

Nigerian government agency

- Formation: 1963
- Headquarters: Umaru Musa Yar'Adua Expressway, Sauka, Abuja.
- Comptroller-General: Kemi Nanna Nandap
- Website: immigration.gov.ng

The Nigeria Immigration Service (NIS) is a government agency of the Federal Republic of Nigeria, responsible for the country's border security and migration management. It was established by the Act of Parliament in 1963. In 2015, the 1963 Act was repealed and replaced with the Immigration Act 2015 which positions the service with the legal instrument to combat the smuggling of migrants (SOM) in Nigeria. The Nigeria Immigration Service is a paramilitary agency under the Federal Ministry of Interior and it is considered a critical member of the National Security Architecture of Nigeria.

== History ==
The Nigeria Immigration Service (NIS) was separated from the Nigeria Police (NP) in August 1958, known at that time as the Immigration Department, and headed by the Chief Federal Immigration Officer.

The Immigration Department was established by an Act of Parliament (Cap 171, Laws of the Federation of Nigeria) on August 1, 1963, when Alhaji Shehu Shagari was the Minister of Internal Affairs (a position now referred to as Minister of Interior).

The initial Law regulating Immigration Duties was the Immigration Act of 1963 which was amended in 2014 and again in 2015 (Immigration Act, 2015).

The Service has from 1963 been restructured to manage modern migration in line with global, regional, and sub-regional political alignments.

The NIS has leveraged the use of Information and Communication Technologies in its operations including:

- The introduction of the Machine Readable electronic passport (MRP) in 2007
- The creation of a Service website (www.immigration.gov.ng) and portal (portal.immigration.gov.ng)
- Global Passport intervention in line with the Federal Government Policy on Citizenship Diplomacy
- Forensic laboratory services for the examination of travel documents and monetary instruments
- The introduction of the Combined Expatriate Residence Permit and Aliens Card (CERPAC)

As empowered by Section 2 of the Immigration Act, 2015, the Service is responsible for:

- The control of persons entering or leaving Nigeria
- The issuance of travel documents, including Nigerian passports, to bonafide Nigerians within and outside Nigeria
- The issuance of residence permits to foreigners in Nigeria
- Border surveillance and patrol
- Enforcement of laws and regulations with which they are directly charged; and
- The performance of such para-military duties within or outside Nigeria as may be required of them under the authority of this Act or any other enactment

== Structure ==
The Nigeria Immigration is administratively structured into 10 directorates and 7 units.

Directorates

- Human Resources Management;
- Finance and Accounts;
- Planning, Research and Statistics;
- Passport and Other Travel Documents;
- Investigation and Compliance;
- Border Management;
- Migration;
- Visa and Residency
- Works and Logistics
- ICT and Cyber Security

Units

- Procurement;
- Legal;
- Internal Audits;
- SERVICOM;
- Internal Security;
- Press and Public Relations;
- Anti-Corruption and Transparency.

== Personnel ==
The NIS as a strategic paramilitary organization comprises 25,303 (twenty five thousand three hundred and three) personnel, with officers ranging from Assistant, Inspectorate, Superintendent to Comptroller cadre responsible for all the key immigration duties in migration and border management.

== Command and Control Centre ==
On the 1st of November, 2018, the contract for the construction of the first phase of the NIS Technology Building was awarded to Julius Berger and the second phase of the project was awarded on the 14th of December, 2020. The Technology Building, which when completed will be the most technologically sophisticated building to be owned and operated by NIS since its establishment in 1963, is designed to serve as the Command and Control of the service. The project was executed, completed and delivered by Julius Berger. It was commissioned by President Muhammadu Buhari on the 21st of March, 2021. During the commissioning, the Comptroller General of the NIS Muhammed Babandede, said, "For us in NIS, the unveiling of this building today, provides a unique platform for security agencies in the country to truly synergize and harmonize efforts under one roof to frontally address various national security concerns using the instrumentality of information and communication technology. The nature of the building and its robust IT infrastructure makes it a great investment and a huge contribution to global security, particularly with its effective connectivity to special platforms such as the INTERPOL and ICAO PKD/PKI databases..........with this, both local and transnational criminal activities can be easily monitored and nipped in the bud.” The Command and Control Centre is located at the NIS headquarters in Sauka. The building is located within the NIS headquarters complex in Sauka, Abuja and has a gross floor area of 3600 square meters. It facilitates include E-border Management System, Passport Management System, and the Advanced Passengers Information System. The facility provides air, marine, and land border surveillance and at the same time affords the NIS global integration where it can seamlessly work with the INTERPOL and other international security agency. In October 2024, over 100 specially trained personnel were inaugurated to man the infrastructure at the facility.

== Data Centre ==
The Nigerian Immigration Service operates a tier-1 1.4 petabytes data centre within its sprawling headquarters complex in Abuja, which houses a comprehensive range of critical national informatics like bio-data of citizens.

== Board ==
The Nigeria Immigration Service is governed by the Civil Defence, Correctional, Fire and Immigration Services Board (CDCFIB), a joint board under the Federal Ministry of Interior that envisages to develop a virile, motivated, disciplined Paramilitary Services that ensure peace, safety and stability of the Country. The CDCFIB provides governance for the Nigeria Immigration Service and its sister paramilitary agencies, the Nigeria Security and Civil Defence Corps, Nigerian Correctional Service, and the Federal Fire Service.

== Training school ==
The Nigeria Immigration Service Training Service is located in Kano State.

== Enabling instruments ==
- Nigerian Immigration Act 2015
- Immigration Regulation 2017
- Immigration Manual 2019
- Standard Operating Procedure for Combating SOM 2019
- Nigerian Visa Policy 2020

== List of leadership ==
- E. H. Harrison, Esq (Chief Federal Immigration Officer) from 1962 – 1966
- J. E. Onugogu, Esq (Chief Federal Immigration Officer) from 1966 – 1967
- Alayedeino, Esq (Chief Federal Immigration Officer) from 1967 – 1976
- Alhaji Aliyu Muhammed (Director of Immigration) from 1977 – 1979
- Alhaji Lawal Sambo (Director of Immigration) from 1979 -1985
- Muhammed Damulak, Esq (Director of Immigration) from 1985 – 1990
- Alhaji Garba Abbas (last Director of Immigration, 1st Comptroller-General Immigration Service – CGIS) from 1990 – 1995
- Alhaji Sahabi Abubakar (Comptroller-General Immigration Service – CGIS) from 1995 – 1999
- Alhaji U. K. Umar (Acting Comptroller-General Immigration Service – Ag. CGIS) from 1999 – 2000
- Lady U. C. Nwizu (Comptroller-General Immigration Service – CGIS) from 2000 – 2004
- Mr. Chukwurah Joseph Udeh (Comptroller-General Immigration Service – CGIS) from 2005 – 2010
- Mrs. Rose Chinyere Uzoma (Comptroller-General Immigration Service – CGIS) from 2010 – 2013
- Rilwan Bala Musa, mni (Acting Comptroller-General Immigration Service – Ag. CGIS) 2013
- David Shikfu Parradang, mni (Comptroller-General Immigration Service – CGIS) from 2013 – 2015
- Martin Kure Abeshi (Comptroller-General Immigration Service – CGIS) from 2015 – 2016
- Muhammed Babandede, MFR (Comptroller-General Immigration Service – CGIS) from 2016 – 2021
- Idris Isah Jere, Acting (Comptroller-General Immigration Service – CGIS) from 2021 – 2023
- Adepoju Carol Wura-Ola, (Comptroller-General Immigration Service – CGIS) from 2023 – 2024
- Kemi Nanna Nandap,(Comptroller-General Immigration Service – CGIS) from 21 February 2024 – date

== See also ==
- Immigration to Nigeria
