= Wahab Egbewole =

Nigerian academic

11th Vice-Chancellor of University of Ilorin
- Incumbent
- Assumed office 15 October 2022
- Preceded by: Sulyman Age Abdulkareem

Personal details
- Born: Wahab Olasupo Egbewole
- Education: Obafemi Awolowo University, University of Ilorin
- Profession: legal practitioner and academic

Wahab Olasupo Egbewole is a professor of International law and jurisprudence and a Senior Advocate of Nigeria and the Vice-Chancellor of the University of Ilorin in Nigeria. He is a professor in the Department of Jurisprudence and International Law, University of Ilorin. He was appointed after 25 years of working with the University as a lecturer. He is an academic and a published author.

== Background ==
Egbewole hails from Ile-Ife, of Osun State, Nigeria. He was once the Director of the General Studies Division of the university.

He served on the university's Senate and Governing Council before being named Professor of Jurisprudence and International Law in 2012.

== Career ==
Wahab Egbewole joined started his career at the University of Ilorin in 1997 as a Lecturer II. He was called to the Nigerian Bar as a Solicitor and Advocate on 20 August 1985. Prof Egbewole’s served at the Law Faculty as the Acting Head of Department, Sub-Dean, Acting Dean of Law, Dean of Law in 2010 among others. He has also served the University of Ilorin as the Director, General Studies Division. In 2012, Egbewole was appointed as a Professor of Jurisprudence and International law.

During an academic exchange mechanism conference organized in Beijing, China in September 2024, Egbewole signed a memorandum of understanding between the University of Ilorin and North China University of Water Resources and Electric Power; this partnership was aimed at establishing academic collaboration between the universities and promoting academic cooperation in various fields.

== Publications ==
- Education law, strategic policy, and sustainable development in Africa : Agenda 2063, 2017-2018
- Judicial independence in Africa 2017-2018
- Law and sustainable development in Africa, 2012
- Readings in jurisprudence & international law, 2004
- Law and climate change in Nigeria, 2011
- Education Law, Strategic Policy and Sustainable Development in Africa : Agenda 2063, 2018
- Perspectives on the legislature in the government of Nigeria, 2010
- Judex : hope for the hopeful and the hopeless, 2013
- Essays in honour of Hon. Justice Bolarinwa Babalakin, 2003
- Essays in honour of Hon. Justice Salihu Modibbo Alfa Begore, the honourable chief justice of Nigeria, 2006

== Professional membership ==
Professor Egbewole is member of professional associations, which includes:

- Nigerian Bar Association
- Nigerian Association of Law Teachers
- American Society of International Law
- African Bar Association
- International Bar Association
- Chartered Institute of Arbitrators (UK).
