= Federal University, Lokoja =

University in Kogi State

Federal University Lokoja
- Other names: Fulokoja, FUL
- Motto: Sic Itur Ad Astra
- Motto in English: The sky is the limit
- Type: Public
- Established: 2011
- Accreditation: NUC
- Academic affiliations: ACU, AAU
- Vice-Chancellor: Olayemi Akinwunmi
- Academic staff: 5
- Location: Lokoja, Nigeria; 7°51′34″N 6°41′01″E
- Campus: Urban
- Colors: Navy blue and Sky Blue
- Website: www.fulokoja.edu.ng

The Federal University Lokoja, officially styled as FU Lokoja or by its acronym, FUL, is a federal university in the confluence city of Lokoja, the capital of Kogi State, north central Nigeria. Lokoja lies at the confluence of the Niger and Benue rivers. This University has two campuses. The permanent campus is located at Felele in Lokoja, and the other campus is located at Adankolo in Lokoja Kogi State.

The university was established in February 2011 by the Federal Government of Nigeria as a result of the indispensable need to create more universities in the country.

== Faculties and College ==
- Faculty of Sciences
- Faculty of Arts
- Faculty of Social Science
- Faculty of Management Science
- Faculty of Education
- College of Health Sciences

== Library ==
The library serves the requirements of its use for teaching, learning, and research.

The University Library was established in the same year the university was established with Dr. Adekunle Kareem Sanusi as the pioneer University Librarian. In May, 2015, a University Librarian, Dr. Ezra Shiloba Gbaje was appointed. Dr. Sarah DaudaYani was appointed the second University Librarian in October 2020

Library Services

- Lending
- User education
- Reference service
- Internet Access
- Printing and Bindery
- Digital Literacy.

== Partnership/MoU ==
The university signed a memorandum of agreement with The Institute Of Sales And Marketing Management Of Nigeria (ISMMN), in enrolling of students in diploma certificate course in sales and marketing management in Nigeria.

=== Anti Corruption unit ===
The Independent Corrupt Practices and Other Related Offences Commission (ICPC) has an anticorruption unit in the university. It said it is to curb incidences of immoral acts in the institution.

==== Inauguration of Tech Lab ====
On 16 February 2024, there is a inauguration of Tech solar power modular Lab in the university.

=== Commission of Building ===
The former governor of Kogi state commission a administrative block building in federal teaching Hospital Lokoja, which is the Teaching hospital of the college of health science of the School.

== Matriculation ==
on 5 April the university matriculate 4925 students into various faculty in the school for the 2023/24 Academic section.

== Convocation ==
The university celebrated her 6th and 7th combined convocation ceremony on 16 October. 2,511 students graduated from the university.

== See also ==
- List of universities in Nigeria
