= Federal Ministry of Health and Social Welfare =

Nigerian government ministry

- Coat of arms of Nigeria

Agency overview
- Jurisdiction: Government of Nigeria
- Headquarters: Federal Secretariat Abuja
- Ministers responsible: Muhammad Ali Pate; Iziaq Adekunle Salako
- Website: www.health.gov.ng

The Federal Ministry of Health and Social Welfare is one of the federal ministries of Nigeria concerned with the formulation and implementation of policies related to health. It is headed by two ministers appointed by the president, assisted by a permanent secretary, who is a career civil servant. The minister of health is Muhammad Ali Pate, the minister of state for health is Iziaq Adekunle Salako and the permanent secretary is Daju Kachollom.

== Departments ==
The ministry has several departments specialising in different aspects of health care. The Department of Family Health is concerned with creating awareness on reproductive, maternal and neonatal and child health, ensuring sound nutrition including infant and young child feeding, and care of the elderly and adolescents.

The Department of Public Health coordinates formulation, implementation and evaluation of public health policies and guidelines. It undertakes health promotion, surveillance, prevention and control of diseases.

The Department of Planning Research and Statistics functions include developing plans and budgets and monitoring their implementation; serving as secretariat to the National Council on Health; conducting health research in collaboration with other departments and agencies, institutions and parastatals; conducting operational research and data collection, and performing various coordination functions.

The Department of Hospital Services coordinates Nigeria's teaching hospitals, orthopedic hospitals, federal medical centres and national eye centres. The department processes appointment of chief medical directors and medical directors, supervises oral health research, develops policies on nursing, coordinates training programmes for nurses and monitors the midwifery service scheme in collaboration with the National Primary Health Care Development Agency.

The Department of Food and Drugs Services formulates national policies, guidelines and strategies on food and drugs, and ensures ethical delivery of pharmaceutical services nationwide. The department sponsors the National Institute for Pharmaceutical Research and Development and the National Agency for Food and Drug Administration and Control, and acts as regulator through the Pharmacy Council of Nigeria, the Institute of Chartered Chemists of Nigeria and the Institute of Public Analysts of Nigeria.

The Health System Strengthening Division is mandated to plan for human resource development in health.

== Agencies and parastatals ==
- National Primary Health Care Development Agency (NPHCDA): Focuses on primary health care.
- National Agency for Food and Drug Administration and Control (NAFDAC): Regulates food and drugs.
- National Health Insurance Authority (NHIA): Manages health insurance.
- Nigeria Centre for Disease Control and Prevention (NCDC): Established in 2011 to manage disease outbreaks with assistance from the US Centers for Disease Control and Prevention.

== Past and present ministers ==
There have been 25 ministers appointed since 1957.

- Ayotunde Rosiji (1957–1959)
- Waziri Ibrahim (1959–1964)
- Moses Majekodunmi (1964–1966)
- Joseph Adetoro (1967–1971)
- Josiah Okezie (1971–1972)
- Aminu Kano (1972–1974)
- Emmanuel Abisoye (1974–1979)
- Daniel Ugwu (1979–1983)
- Patrick Koshoni (1984–1985)
- Emmanuel Nyong Nsan (1985–1985)
- Olikoye Ransome-Kuti (1985–1993)
- Julius Adelusi-Adeluyi (1993–1993)
- Dalhatu Tafida (1993–1995)
- Ihechukwu Madubuike (1995–1997)
- Jubril Ayinla (1997–1998)
- Timothy Menakaya (1999–2001)
- Alphonsus Nwosu (2001–2003)
- Eyitayo Lambo (2003–2007)
- Adenike Grange (2007–2008)
- Babatunde Osotimehin (2008–2010)
- Onyebuchi Chukwu (2010–2014)
- Haliru Alhassan (2015–2015)
- Issac Adewole (2015–2019)
- Osagie Ehanire (2019–2023)
- Muhammad Ali Pate (since August 2023)

== See also ==
- Nigerian Civil Service
- Federal Ministries of Nigeria
- Health care in Nigeria
