= National Primary Health Care Development Agency (Nigeria) =

Nigerian Government Agency

- Promoting primary health care across Nigeria
- Abbreviation: NPHCDA
- Formation: 1992
- Founder: Federal Government of Nigeria
- Type: Government agency
- Purpose: To strengthen and sustain primary health care systems in Nigeria
- Headquarters: Abuja, Nigeria
- Region served: Nationwide
- Official language: English
- Executive Director: Muyi Aina
- Main organ: Board of Directors
- Parent organization: Federal Ministry of Health (Nigeria)
- Affiliations: World Health Organization (WHO), UNICEF, Gavi, the Vaccine Alliance
- Budget: N13.5bn (Naira) - 2025
- Website: nphcda.gov.ng

The National Primary Health Care Development Agency otherwise known as NPHCDA is a Federal Government of Nigeria agency established to improve access to quality primary healthcare services, enhance immunization coverage, and promote sustainable health initiatives for communities across the nation.

== History ==
The agency was established by the Federal Government of Nigeria on December 10, 1992, following the promulgation of Decree No. 29. This decree aimed to address the deficiencies in Nigeria's primary healthcare system by creating a dedicated body responsible for its development, coordination, and implementation across the country. The agency was established as part of the government's commitment to achieving comprehensive and accessible healthcare services for all Nigerians, especially in underserved and rural areas.

The primary purpose of NPHCDA was to support the Federal Ministry of Health in strengthening the primary healthcare infrastructure and ensuring that essential healthcare services, including immunization, maternal and child health, and disease prevention, were accessible to all citizens. The agency was also tasked with coordinating national health programs, mobilizing resources, and facilitating partnerships with international organizations, such as the World Health Organization (WHO), UNICEF, and Gavi, the Vaccine Alliance.

In line with its mandate, the NPHCDA has played a significant role in health initiatives, such as the national immunization program, malaria control, and polio eradication. It also facilitates the development of community-based health systems and works towards integrating primary healthcare with secondary and tertiary levels of care.

The creation of NPHCDA was solidified under the Federal Republic of Nigeria's Decree No. 29, which states:

"A body to be known as the National Primary Health Care Development Agency shall be established, which shall be charged with the responsibility of developing and implementing primary health care programs across Nigeria."

=== Mandate ===
The agency is mandated to strengthen Nigeria's primary healthcare system, ensuring equitable access to essential health services, promoting immunization, and coordinating national health programs. It also mobilizes resources, fosters partnerships, and develops community-based health systems to improve overall healthcare delivery nationwide.

=== Jurisdiction ===
It operates nationwide, with jurisdiction over all regions and localities in Nigeria. The agency focuses on strengthening primary healthcare systems at the grassroots level, ensuring access to essential health services in urban and rural areas, and paying particular attention to underserved communities. The agency collaborates with state governments, local authorities, and international partners to implement its programs nationwide.

=== Leadership and structure ===
The agency is led by an executive director appointed by the president of Nigeria. The current executive director, Dr. Muyi Aina, oversees the agency's strategic direction, implementation of health programs, and partnership collaborations.

Its structure includes several key departments and units responsible for primary healthcare development, including immunization, disease control, maternal and child health, and healthcare infrastructure. These departments work together to execute NPHCDA's initiatives and ensure the effective delivery of healthcare services across Nigeria.

The leadership also includes a board of directors composed of key stakeholders from the health sector who provide oversight and guidance. Additionally, the agency is supported by a deputy executive director who assists in managing daily operations and other senior management and staff who oversee specific health programs and projects.

== See also ==
- Federal Ministry of Health (Nigeria)
- World Health Organization (WHO)
- UNICEF
