= List of teaching hospitals in Nigeria =

A teaching hospital is an institutional facility responsible for providing medical training to students and graduates of medical schools. These hospitals are usually affiliated with a university or medical school. There are more than 50 teaching hospitals in the country, owned by the federal government, state governments and private universities.. The following is a list of teaching hospitals in Nigeria.

- Afe Babalola University Teaching Hospital
- Lagos University Teaching hospital
- University of Benin Teaching Hospital
- Rasheed Shekoni Federal University Teaching Hospital
- Aminu Kano Teaching Hospital
- Abia State University Teaching Hospital
- Bingham University Teaching Hospital
- Barau Dikko Teaching Hospital
- Imo State University Teaching Hospital,
- Olabisi Onabanjo University Teaching Hospital
- Ahmadu Bello University Teaching Hospital
- University of Port Harcourt Teaching Hospital
- University of Uyo Teaching Hospital
- University College Hospital, Ibadan
- University of Calabar Teaching Hospital
- Usmanu Danfodiyo University Teaching Hospital
- Abuja University Teaching Hospital
- Delta State University Teaching Hospital
- Igbinedion University Teaching Hospital
- Irrua Specialist Teaching Hospital
- University of Nigeria Teaching Hospital
- Obafemi Awolowo University Teaching Hospital
- Benue State University Teaching Hospital
- Jos University Teaching Hospital
- Ekiti State University Teaching Hospital
- Niger Delta University Teaching Hospital
- Nnamdi Azikiwe University Teaching Hospital
- Federal Teaching Hospital, Ido Ekiti
- Ladoke Akintola University of Technology Teaching Hospital
- Abubakar Tafawa Balewa University Teaching Hospital
- Federal University Teaching Hospital Wukari
- Alex Ekwueme Federal Teaching Hospital
- Ebonyi State University Teaching Hospital
- University of Ilorin Teaching Hospital
- University of Maiduguri Teaching Hospital
- Lagos State University Teaching Hospital
- Federal Teaching Hospital, Gombe
- Federal University Teaching Hospital, Owerri
- David Umahi Federal University Teaching Hospital, Uburu
- Chukwuemeka Odumegwu Ojukwu University Teaching Hospital, Awka
- Enugu State University Teaching Hospital
- UNIOSUN Teaching Hospital, Osogbo
- Muhammad Abdullahi Wase Teaching Hospital, Kano
- Yobe State University Teaching Hospital
- Rivers State University Teaching Hospital
- Prince Abubakar Audu University Teaching Hospital, Anyigba
- Babcock University Teaching Hospital
- Bowen University Teaching Hospital
