= Mental healthcare in Nigeria =

Mental healthcare

Mental healthcare generally refers to services ranging from assessment, diagnosis, treatment, to counseling, dedicated to maintaining and restoring the mental well-being of people. In Nigeria, there is significant disparity between the demand and supply of mental health services. Though there are policies aimed at addressing mental health issues in Nigeria, in-depth information on mental health service in Nigeria is non-existent. This makes it difficult to identify areas of needs, coordinate activities of advocacy groups, and make an informed decision about policy direction. In effect, there is continued neglect of mental health issues. About 25-30 percent of Nigerians suffer from mental illness and less than 10 percent of this population have access to professional assistance. The World Health Organization estimates that only about three percent of the government's budget on health goes to mental health.

== Mental health policies history ==
The Nigeria's mental health legislation was tagged lunacy ordinance and was first passed in 1916. It was amended in 1958 to grants medical practitioners and magistrates the authority to detain anyone suffering from mental illness, it was renamed the lunacy Act of 1958. Nigeria's mental health policy was first formulated in 1991. Its components include advocacy, promotion, prevention, treatment and rehabilitation.

In 2003, a bill for the establishment of Mental Health Act was introduced by Sen. Ibiabuye Martyns-Yellowe and Sen. Dalhatu Tafida but was later withdrawn in April 2009 after no considerable progress.

Four years later, precisely on March 20, 2013, the bill was re-introduced to the National Assembly by Hon. Samuel Babatunde Adejare and Hon. Solomon Olamilekan Adeola. The bill was proposed to protect the rights of persons with mental disorders, ensure equal access to treatment and care, discourage stigma and discrimination and set standards for psychiatric practice in Nigeria. The bill makes provisions for access to mental healthcare and services, Voluntary and involuntary treatment, accreditation of professional and facilities, Law enforcement and other judicial issues for people with mental illness, mechanisms to oversee involuntary admission and mechanism to implement the provision of Mental health Legislations. The bill was also not enacted.

Another mental health bill tagged Mental and Substance Abuse Bill was sponsored in 2019 by Senator Ibrahim Yahaya Oloriegbe, representing Kwara Central Senatorial District in the 9th National Assembly, the bill was proposed to address the establishment and regulation of mental health and substance abuse services and to protect the right of people with mental health issues as well as to establish a commission for mental health. A public hearing for the bill took place on Feb 19, 2020 and was only signed into law in January 2023 by President Muhammad Buhari. [^{29}]

== Mental hospitals in Nigeria ==
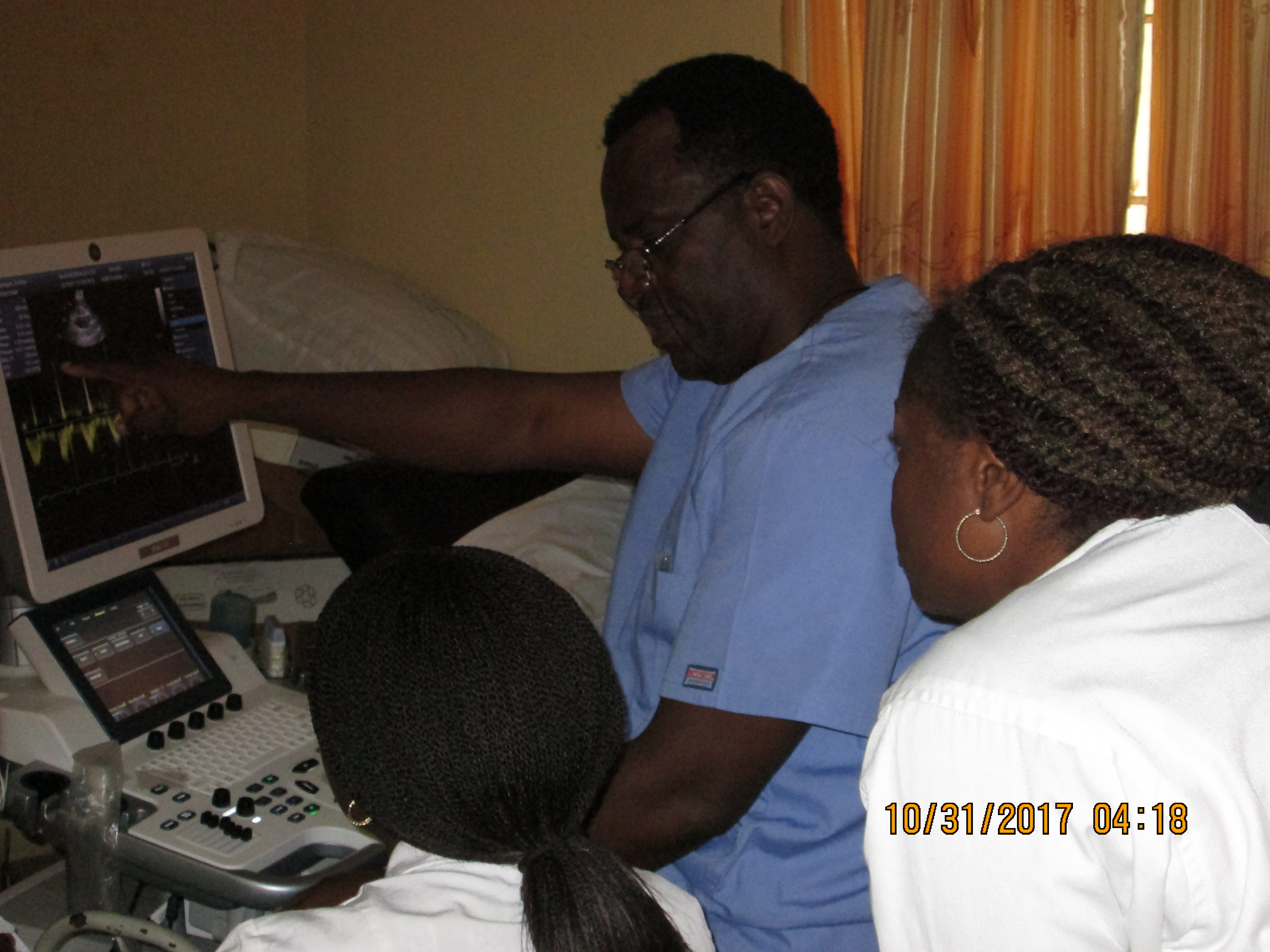
OAUTHC in Ile-Ife, Nigeria.

The first mental hospitals in Nigeria are the Calabar Lunatic Asylum in southeastern Nigeria, and Yaba Lunatic Asylum in southwestern Nigeria. The latter, renamed Yaba Mental Hospital in 1961, and again given its current name Yaba Psychiatric Center (Federal Neuro Psychiatric Hospital) in 1977, admitted its first batch of 14 patients (8 women and 6 men) on 31 October 1907. The Yaba Lunatic Asylum which was situated in the former headquarters of the Nigeria Railways. In 1915, it became overcrowded, and some cells in Lagos prison were turned into Lunatic Asylum. Dr. Crispin Curtis Adeniyi Jones, a Nigerian Physician and also an official of the Lagos Medical Service became the first Director of the Lagos Lunatic Asylum.

Neuropsychiatric Hospital Aro, Abeokuta started as an asylum on the 13th of April, 1944 with 13 health attendants from the then Yaba Asylum ad five mentally ill patients. In 1948, the present site of Aro Neuropsychiatric Hospital of 732 acres was acquired for the hospital to carter for the overpopulation being experienced at the Lantoro annex. The renowned late Professor Thomas Adeoye Lambo (OFR) headed the main hospital at new site and brought the institute into spotlight through the creative 'Aro Village System' of treating the mentally ill. The institute became a WHO Collaborating Centre for Research and Training in Mental Health in August 1979. The institute has won different awards over the years - 2015 Best Primary Health Care Provider in Nigerian, 2010 Health Facility Utilization Award in Ogun state, 2007 best Specialty Hospital in Nigeria, 1999 most outstanding public sector organization in Nigerian.

Federal Neuro Psychiatric Hospital, Uselu, Benin City was first created in 1963, as an asylum with pioneer staff from Neuropsychiatric Hospital, Aro, Abeokuta. It is one of Nigeria federal government funded centers for Psychiatry in Nigeria.

The remaining federal government funded centers for Psychiatry are:

- Federal Neuro-Psychiatric Hospital, Calabar
- Federal Neuro-Psychiatric Hospital, Maiduguri
- Federal Neuro-Psychiatric Hospital, Enugu
- Federal Neuro-Psychiatric Hospital, Kaduna
- Federal Neuro-Psychiatric Hospital, Kware

Federal Neuro-Psychiatric Hospital Budo-Egba Kwara State, established by President Muhammad Buhari administration in 2022 following a bill by Senator Ibrahim Yahaya Oloriegbe that was signed to law by the President in 2022 as the 9th Federal Neuro-Psychiatric Hospital in Nigeria. https://fnphbudoegba.gov.ng

Federal Neuro-Psychiatric Hospital, Dawanau, Kano State as an upgrade of the Kano State Psychiatric Hospital.

In addition to the Federal Neuro-Psychiatric Hospital, some Nigeria universities' teaching hospitals also have psychiatric units-

- University of Benin Teaching Hospital, Edo
- University College Hospital, Ibadan, Oyo
- Obafemi Awolowo University Teaching Hospital Complex, Ile-Ife, Osun
- University of Port Harcourt Teaching Hospital, Rivers
- University of Calabar Teaching Hospital
- University of Ilorin Teaching Hospital, Kwara
- Jos University Teaching Hospital, Jos, Plateau
- Ahmadu Bello University Teaching Hospital, Kaduna
- Usman Dan Fodio University Teaching Hospital, Sokoto
- Aminu Kano Teaching Hospital, Kano
- University of Nigeria Teaching Hospital, Enugu

== Mental health crisis in Nigeria ==
=== Shortage of psychiatrists and mental health support workers ===
One out of four Nigerians, an estimate of about 50 million people are living with some sort of mental illness. According to Nigerian Medical Association, 350 psychiatrists currently serve Nigerians with an estimated population of about 200 million people, this was stated during the celebration of 2020 World Mental Health Day. This is similar to the estimated number of 250 psychiatrists serving Nigerians claimed by Dr. Taiwo Sheikh, the president of the Association of Psychiatrists of Nigeria. Shortage of mental health professionals in addition to inadequate infrastructures and poor public attitudes towards mental illness has result to about 80 percent of people with serious mental illness unable to access adequate care. To address this challenge, Slum and Rural Health Initiative (SRHIN) has launched GENSCORE, an AI-powered innovation to improve mental health screening in low-resource communities using Nigerian local languages, including Hausa, Yoruba, and Nigerian Pidgin.

=== Cultural and religious beliefs ===
Cultural and religious stereotypes has significant impact on the recovery process of people with mental health issues. Studies by Africa Polling Institute in collaboration with EpiAFRIC found that many Nigerians still associate mental illness with evil spirits, Voodoo and related supernatural causes. This misconception prompt many to seek treatment from religious leaders, traditional healers etc. Poor public education about mental health has allowed many misconception and low public acceptance of mental health patients to thrive.

According to Nigerian mental health expert, Aisha Bubah, "People do not have [an] understanding about mental health. So mental health gets attributed to so many cultural beliefs, superstitious beliefs and evil. And the image of mental health people have is always the extreme cases." In 2019, Human Rights Watch reported that thousands of people with mental illness are living in ankle chains at institutions designed for care. These, often religiously run, centers are the only accessible option for many families.

=== Poor funding ===
Nigeria federal government has continuous earmarked less than 15% benchmark of health sector budget allocation agreed upon in April 2001 by leaders of the African Union (AU) at Abuja- 5.95% in 2012, 4.4% in 2014, 5.5% in 2015, 4.23% in 2016, 4.16% in 2017, 3.9% in 2018. Despite the low budget allocation for health care in Nigeria, mental health care does not have a clearly defined allocation from the total health care budget allocation. Funding of health care at State and local government level are even worse, with state and local government contributing 29% and 8% of total government spending in the care sector respectively in 2016.
