= Federal Medical Centres =

In Nigeria, primary healthcare is to be provided by Local Governments, secondary health care by State Governments and tertiary health care by the Federal Government. In operationalizing this policy, the Federal Government decided to establish at least one tertiary health institution in each State of the Nigerian Federation. Federal Medical Centres (FMCs), were established nationwide in states that do not have Federal University Teaching Hospitals present. The exception to this rule are Lagos State,and Plateau State which have one such centre in addition to a Teaching Hospital.

== List of Federal Medical Centres ==
There are a total of 23 FMCs all over the country. As a general rule, most of the centres are situated in the State capital, especially in situations where the apex secondary health institution run by the state does not adequately meet the demands for specialist health care by the citizenry.

- Federal Medical Centre, Abakaliki, Ebonyi State.
- Federal Medical Centre, Abeokuta, Abeokuta, Ogun State.
- Federal Medical Centre, Asaba, Delta State.
- Federal Medical Centre, Abuja, Nigeria, Federal Capital Territory.
- Federal Medical Centre, Azare, Bauchi State.
- Federal Medical Centre (Bida), Bida, Niger State.
- Federal Medical Centre, Birnin-Kebbi, Kebbi State.
- Federal Medical Centre, Birnin Kudu, Jigawa State.
- Federal Medical Centre Ebute, Ebute-Meta, Lagos State.
- Federal Medical Centre, Gombe, Gombe State.
- Federal Medical Centre, Gusau, Zamfara State.
- Federal Medical Centre, Ido Ekiti, Ekiti State
- Federal Medical Centre, Jalingo, Taraba State.
- Federal Medical Centre, Katsina, Katsina State.
- Federal Medical Centre, Keffi, Nasarawa State.
- Federal Medical Centre, Lokoja, Kogi State.
- Federal Medical Centre, Makurdi, Benue State.
- Federal Medical Centre, Nguru, Yobe State.
- Federal Medical Centre, Owerri, Imo State.
- Federal Medical Centre (Owo), Owo Ondo State.
- Federal Medical Centre, Umuahia, Abia State.
- Federal Medical Centre, Yenagoa, Bayelsa State
- Federal Medical Centre, Yola, Adamawa State
- Federal Medical Centre, Ikole Ekiti, Ekiti State
- Federal Medical Centre Wase, Wase, Plateau State

Federal Medical Center Hong, Adamawa State
