= Federal Medical Centre, Ido Ekiti =

Federal Medical Centre in Nigeria

Geography
- Location: Ido Ekiti, Ekiti State, Nigeria

Links
- Website: fethi.gov.ng
- Lists: Hospitals in Nigeria

Federal Medical Centre, Ido Ekiti is a federal government of Nigeria medical centre located in Ido Ekiti, Ekiti State, Nigeria. The current chief medical director is Adekunle Ajayi.

== History ==
Federal Medical Centre, Ido Ekiti was established in 1998. The hospital was formerly known as General Hospital, Ido Ekiti.

== CMD ==
The current Chief Medical Director is Professor Ebenezer Adekunle Ajayi.

=== Director of administration ===
After upgrading to Teaching hospital, the federal government in 2024 appointed Mrs Foluso Moronke Adelegan as the Director of Administration and secretary to the board of management in federal teaching hospital ido Ekiti.

== Department ==
=== Clinical Departments ===
- Family Medicine
- Health Information Management
- Haematology & Blood Transfusion
- Med Micro & Parasitology
- Accident & Emergency
- Dentistry
- Surgery

=== Physiotherapy ===
- Neurology / Medicine
- Orthopaedics / Manual Therapy
- Paediatrics Physiotherapy
- Physiotherapy in Women's health
- Cardiopulmonary Physiotherapy
- Geriatric Physiotherapy
- Community Physiotherapy

== Upgrade to Teaching hospital ==
The medical center in 2023 was upgraded to teaching hospital status.
