= List of hospitals in Edo State =

This is a list of hospitals in Edo State in Nigeria grouped by nature of ownership and sorted by hospital name.

== Federal ==
- Irrua Specialist Teaching Hospital
- University of Benin Teaching Hospital

== State ==
- Central Hospital Benin, Benin City
- General Hospital, Auchi

== Private ==
- Pastor Chris Oyakhilome Teaching Hospital, Okada, formerly Igbinedion University Teaching Hospital
- Aniso Specialist Medical Centre, No. 11 2nd Federal road, off 4th S&T road, or off Benin Technical College road, Uselu, Benin city
- Lily Hospital, Benin City
- City of Hope Medical centre, Km 7 Benin Sapele Road, Benin City Edo State
