= Michael Gbala =

Nigerian consultant obstetrician and gynecologist

Michael Olumide Gbala is a Nigerian consultant obstetrician and gynecologist specializing in materno-fetal and gynecologic imaging. He is currently the Chief Medical Director of the University of Medical Sciences Teaching Hospital (UNIMEDTH), Ondo State.

== Early and personal life ==
He was born and grew up in Ondo town by late Evangelist Phillip Osewumiju Gbala and Mrs Felicia Gbala. His father hailed from Irele while his mother was from Ondo town. Michael Gbala is married to Pastor Mrs. Gbala Patience with children.

Gbala is a Christian and serves as a Senior Pastor at the Redeemed Christian Church of God, for Ondo Province 2.

== Education and career ==
Dr Gbala Michael attended St John Bosco Primary School and Independence Grammar School Ondo. He was best students in both schools. His team won the first position of JET competition for all Science and Technology students in all Secondary School in Ondo State in 1990. He obtained a Bachelor of Medicine and Surgery (MBBS) degree from Obafemi Awolowo University, Ile-Ife. He proceeded for his residency training in obstetrics and gynaecology at the University of Benin Teaching Hospital and Jos University Teaching Hospital respectively. He is a member and fellow of the West African College of Surgeons and also the International College of Surgeons. He is a Fellow of the Chartered Institute of Human Resources Management, Associate member of the Chartered Institute of Personnel Management. He holds a Diploma in Theology from The Redeemed Bible College.
