= Lamidi Adeyemi III =

Nigerian traditional ruler (1938–2022)

- Aláàfin ti Ọ̀yọ́; Ikú Bàbá Yèyé
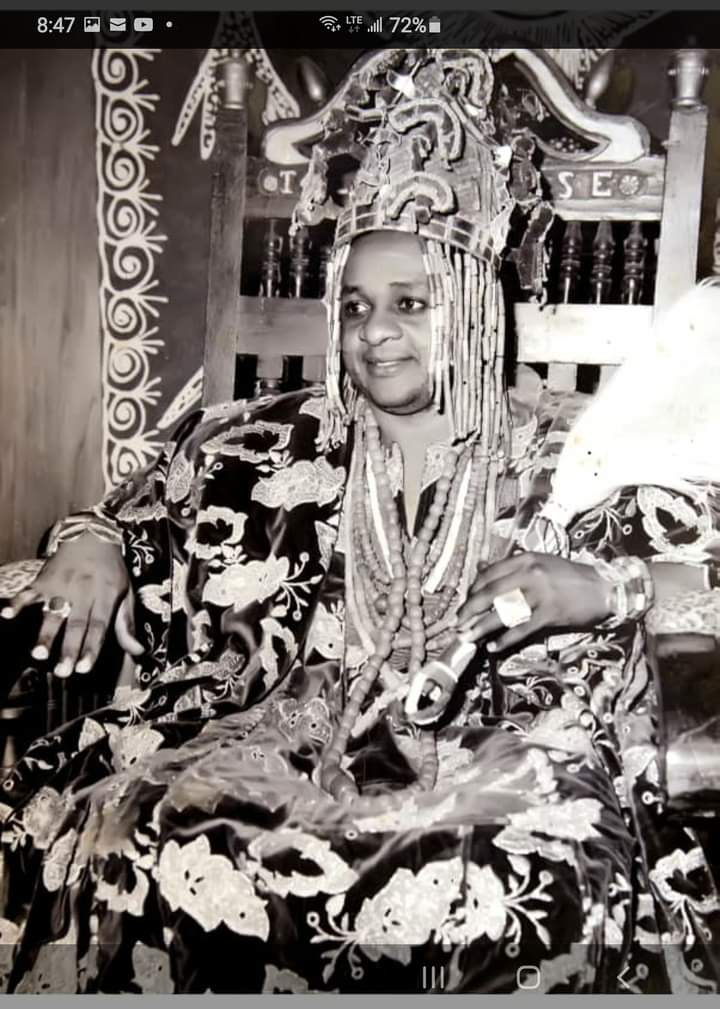

Alaafin of Oyo
- Reign: 18 November 1970 – 22 April 2022
- Coronation: 18 November 1970
- Predecessor: Gbadegesin Ladigbolu II
- Successor: Abimbola Owoade
- Born: Lámídì Ọláyíwọlá Àtàndá Adéyẹmí; 15 October 1938; Oyo, Nigeria
- Died: 22 April 2022 (aged 83); Ado-Ekiti, Ekiti State, Nigeria
- Spouse: See: Ayaba Abibat Adeyemi, amongst others
Names
- Lamidi Olayiwola Adeyemi
Regnal name
- Oba Lamidi Adeyemi III
- House: Oranyan
- Religion: Islam

Lamidi Olayiwola Adeyemi III (15 October 1938 – 22 April 2022) was the Alaafin, or traditional ruler, of the Yoruba town of Oyo and rightful heir to the throne of its historic empire.

== Early life and ancestry ==
Alaafin Adeyemi III was born Lamidi Olayiwola Atanda Adeyemi on 15 October 1938 into the Alowolodu Royal House, and as a member of the House of Oranmiyan to Alhaji Kareem Adeniran Adeyemi (born 1871–1960), who later became Alaafin in 1945, and Ibironke of Epo-Gingin, who died when he was young. His father is said to have had over 200 wives. His paternal grandfather was Alaafin Adeyemi I Alowolodu, who ruled during the Kiriji War, and was the last independent ruler of the Oyo Empire before British colonialism. Alaafin Adeyemi I's father, and Adeyemi III's great-grandfather was Oba Atiba Atobatele, who founded New Oyo. Atiba's father, his great-great-grandfather, was Alaafin Abiodun, and is a direct descendant of Oranmiyan, the founder of the Oyo Empire.

Lamidi's father, the Alaafin of Oyo Oba Adeyemi II Adeniran, was deposed and exiled in 1954 for sympathizing with the National Council of Nigerian Citizens (NCNC). He had come into conflict with Bode Thomas, deputy leader of the Action Group.

According to rumors, Bode Thomas shouted at him for not standing to greet him as the chairman of NCNC during a political gathering at a party. Oba Adeyemi II Adeniran, insulted, stood and then told Bode Thomas to go home and bark like a dog. Later, he started coughing blood and died while walking back home leaving his entourage. Shortly, Herbert Macaulay heard of the catastrophe, and along with Obafemi Awolowo accused Oba Adeyemi II of poisoning Thomas, and then exiled him from his kingdom. He lived out the rest of his days in Lagos where his subjects still visited him until his death in 1960.

== Coronation ==
Lamidi Adeyemi succeeded Alaafin Gbadegesin Ladigbolu II in 1970, during the governorship of Colonel Robert Adeyinka Adebayo, after the end of the Nigerian Civil War. In 1975, the head of state General Murtala Ramat Muhammed included Oba Adeyemi in his entourage to the hajj. He was chancellor of Uthman dan Fodiyo University in Sokoto from 1980 to 1992. In 1990, President Ibrahim Babangida appointed him Amir-ul-Hajj in recognition of his commitment to the consolidation of Islam in Nigeria. In 2021, President Muhammadu Buhari appointed him as the Chancellor of the University of Maiduguri

== Political attachment ==
On 3 May 2011, the outgoing Oyo State Governor Adebayo Alao-Akala announced that the Alaafin of Oyo, Oba Lamidi Adeyemi III was no longer Permanent Chairman of the Council of Obas and Chiefs in Oyo State. The state government had just passed a law that introduced rotation of the office of chairman between the Alaafin and his two rivals, the Olubadan of Ibadanland and the Soun of Ogbomoso. It was said that the measure, introduced by the state assembly with the People's Democratic Party (PDP) majority, was in response to the Oba's support for the Action Congress of Nigeria (ACN) during the April 2011 elections. The ACN beat the PDP decisively in that election.

Talking in September 1984 he said: "Traditional rulers should be seen as the perfect embodiment of the culture of the place, as well as the synthesis of the aspirations and goals of the nation. This is not only in social values of veracity, egalitarianism, justice and democracy; but in dress, utterances and comportment; even the mere necessary trivialities that mark Nigeria and the locality as a distinctive entity".

== Personal life ==
He was married to Ayaba Abibat Adeyemi, his senior wife. He attended most events with her or with one of the twelve junior wives that he also was married to.

His other wives were Ayaba Rahmat Adedayo Adeyemi, Ayaba Suliat Motunrayo Adeyemi, Ayaba Mujidat Adeyemi, Ayaba Rukayat Adeyemi, Ayaba Folashade Adeyemi, Ayaba Badirat Ajoke Adeyemi, Ayaba Memunat Omowunmi Adeyemi, Ayaba Omobolanle Adeyemi, Ayaba Moji Adeyemi, Ayaba Anuoluwapo Adeyemi, and Ayaba Damilola Adeyemi.

He was a lover of boxing, as he was a boxer before ascending the throne of his Fathers.

== Death ==
The Alaafin died at the age of 83 on 22 April 2022 at the Afe Babalola University Teaching Hospital, Ado Ekiti in Ekiti State, after developing complications related to prostate enlargement. His reign of 51 years is the longest reign of any Alaafin of Oyo in modern recorded history. His death was announced on several major Nigerian news networks on the morning of the next day, where his remains had already been returned to Oyo for the initial traditional rites which begins with the slaughtering of a goat at the entrance of the palace, called Oju Abata, to indicate the passing of the monarch. His death was the third of a senior monarch in Oyo State within five months. Abimbola Owoade was selected and approved as his successor.
