= General Hospital Gashua =

Public hospital in Yobe State, Nigeria

Specialist Hospital Gashua

Geography
- Location: Gashua, North, Yobe State, Nigeria

History
- Former name: General Hospital Gashua

Links
- Lists: Hospitals in Nigeria

The Specialist Hospital Gashua formerly General Hospital Gashua is a government established hospital located in Gashua, Bade Local Government Area of Yobe State, Nigeria. It provides medical and health care services to the community. It was upgraded to a Specialist Hospital in 2022.
