= Federal Neuro-Psychiatric Hospital, Benin City =

Federal Specialty Hospital in Nigeria

Geography
- Location: Benin, Edo State, Nigeria

Links
- Website: www.fnphbenin.gov.ng
- Lists: Hospitals in Nigeria

Federal Neuro-Psychiatric Hospital, Benin City is a federal government of Nigeria speciality hospital located in Benin, Edo State, Nigeria. The current chief medical director is Imafidon Agbonile.

== History ==
Federal Neuro-Psychiatric Hospital, Benin City was established on 7 December, 1964. The hospital was formerly known as Uselu Clinic.

== CMD ==
The current chief medical director is Imafidon Agbonile.
