= National Orthopaedic Hospital, Enugu =

Federal Specialty Hospital in Nigeria

Geography
- Location: Enugu, Enugu State, Nigeria

Links
- Website: www.nohenugu.org.ng
- Lists: Hospitals in Nigeria

National Orthopaedic Hospital, Enugu is a federal government of Nigeria speciality hospital located in Enugu, Enugu State, Nigeria. The current medical director is Emmanuel Iyidobi.

== History ==
National Orthopaedic Hospital, Enugu was established on 17 January 1975. The hospital was formerly known as Haile SelassieI Institute of Orthopaedic, Plastic and Ophthalmic Surgery.

== Medical Director ==
The current chief medical director is Emmanuel Iyidobi.
