= Federal Medical Centre, Owo =

Federal Medical Centre

Geography
- Location: Obo Road, Owo, Southwestern Nigeria, Ondo State, Nigeria
- Coordinates: 7.217460°N 5.597658°E

Organisation
- Type: General

Links
- Lists: Hospitals in Nigeria

Federal Medical Centre Owo is a public health care centre located in Owo, a city in Ondo State, southwestern Nigeria. The hospital, which had a land area of 58.5 hectares, was subsequently converted to a 300-bed federal tertiary healthcare facility and given the new name Federal Medical Centre, Owo. Activities acknowledged in the centre's administrative and clinical departments in 1993 and 1994, respectively. With the exception of instructing medical students, the centre, like other Federal Medical Centres, is supposed to carry out the duties of Federal University Teaching Hospitals. Additionally, it offers health services as well as any training or research that the health industry may require.

== CMD ==
The former CMD of federal medical center owo in Ondo state Dr Liasu Adeagbo Armed. The New CMD of the medical center appointed by President Bola Ahmed Tinubu is Dr. Adeyinka Joseph Aiyeyemi succeeding Doctor liasu Adeagbo.

== Mission ==
To begin and develop excellent service delivery by putting in place the required infrastructure to be able to provide all of our patients with effective, efficient, and inexpensive health care services. This will be sustained through an effective monitoring and evaluation methodology.

== Departments ==
The Federal Medical center has the following departments:

- Pharmaceutical Services
- Obstetric & Gynaecology
- Nursing Services
- Radiology
- Family Medicine
- Psychiatry
- Physiotherapy
- Ophthalmology
- Dental Services
- Community Health
- Emergency Services
- Surgery
- Medical Social Works
- Anaesthesia
- Dietetics
- Medical Records
- Ear, Nose & Throat
- Staff Medical Services
- Histopathology
- Haemodialysis / Renal Unit
- Intensive Care Unit
- Pathology
- Paediatrics

== Proposed upgrade ==
The Nigerian House of Representatives members on health committee proposed the upgrade of Owo medical center to a teaching hospital.

== Partnership ==
Federal medical centre owo partners with archiver University to boost medical training.
