= Adekunle Ajayi =

Nigerian professor and consultant physician

Adekunle Ebenezer Ajayi is a Nigerian professor and consultant physician. He is currently the Chief Medical Director of Federal Medical Centre, Ido Ekiti.

== Early life, education and career ==
Adekunle Ajayi was born on 2 February 1974 in Igogo-Ekiti, Moba Local Government Area, Ekiti State. He completed his elementary education at Emmanuel Anglican Primary, Igogo-Ekiti in 1985 and his secondary education at Unity Secondary School (now Government College), Usi-Ekiti in 1991. He obtained a Bachelor of Medicine and Surgery (MBBS) degree from the University of Ilorin in 1998. He completed his residency program at the Obafemi Awolowo University Teaching Hospital Complex, Ile-Ife (OAUTHC). He is a Fellow of the West African College of Physicians, Fellow of American College of Physicians, Fellow of the Institute of Management Consultants, amongst several others. He is married with children.
