= Shekoni =

Shekoni is a surname. Notable people with the surname include:

- Judi Shekoni (fl. from 1998), English actress, television personality and businesswoman
- Kayo Shekoni (born 1964), Swedish-Nigerian singer and actress
- Rasheed Shekoni (fl. 1996–1999), Nigerian army officer

== See also ==
- Rasheed Shekoni Federal University Teaching Hospital
