= Issa Baba Awoye =

Nigerian professor and psychiatrist

- Education: University of Ilorin
- Occupations: Professor, psychiatrist
- Title: Medical Director of Federal Neuropsychiatric Hospital (2023–)

Birth and place of Birth: Prof Baba Awoye Issa was born on 22 January 1970. He was born in Ogbondoroko, ASA local government area of Kwara State, Nigeria.

Parents: Alhaji Issa Adio Awoye and Alhaja Saratu Issa (nee Gbadamosi).

Issa Baba Awoye Pronounciationis a Nigerian professor and psychiatrist. He is currently the Medical Director of the Federal Neuropsychiatric Hospital, Budo Egba, Kwara State. He was appointed in 2023 by President Bola Tinubu.

== Education and career ==
Issa Baba is an alumnus of the University of Ilorin, Kwara State. He is a psychiatrist with special interest in mental health care. Until his appointment as CMD, he served as a consultant psychiatrist at the University of Ilorin Teaching Hospital, and is a professor in the faculty of clinical sciences, University of Ilorin. He is a fellow of the West African College of Physicians.

== Honors and awards ==
- Fellow, West African College of Physicians (Psychiatry) Received in April 2004, recognizing significant achievement in psychiatric medicine.
- Member, West African College of Physicians (Psychiatry) Elected in October 2001, marking his early expertise in psychiatry .
- Chairman, Kwara State Chapter of the Nigerian Medical Association (NMA) Elected in 2020, reflecting his peers' recognition of his leadership in state level medical affairs.
- Acting Chief Medical Director, Federal Neuro Psychiatric Hospital, Budo-Egba Appointed on 1 January 2022, as the pioneer head, a prestigious federal leadership role in health.
- Appointed as the substantive Chief Medical Director by President Bola Tinubu on 7 August 2023, in recognition of his outstanding leadership and performance.
