= Oluwabunmi Motunrayo Fatungase =

Nigerian consultant anesthesiologist

Oluwabunmi Motunrayo Fatungase is a Nigerian consultant anesthesiologist. She is currently the Chief Medical Director of the Olabisi Onabanjo University Teaching Hospital (OOUTH).

== Education and career ==
Oluwabunmi Fatungase is a Fellow of the National Postgraduate Medical College and the West African College of Surgeons. Prior to her appointment as CMD, she served as the chairman, Medical Advisory Committee of the hospital. She is happily married with children.
