= National Orthopaedic Hospital, Dala =

Federal Specialty Hospital in Nigeria

Geography
- Location: Dala, Kano State, Nigeria

Services
- Emergency department: Available

History
- Founded: 1959

Links
- Website: nohkano.gov.ng
- Lists: Hospitals in Nigeria

National Orthopaedic Hospital, Dala is a federal government of Nigeria speciality hospital located in Dala, Kano State, Nigeria. The current chief medical director is Dr. Nurudeen Isa.

== History ==
National Orthopaedic Hospital, Dala was established in 1959.

== CMD ==
The current chief medical director is Dr. Nurudeen Isa.
