= Usmanu Danfodiyo University Teaching Hospital =

Nigerian Teaching hospital

Usman Danfodiyo University Teaching Hospital

Geography
- Location: Garba Nadama Rd, Mabera, Sokoto, Nigeria

Organisation
- Type: Public, Multi-Specialty Teaching Hospital
- Affiliated university: Usman Danfodiyo University

Services
- Emergency department: Yes

Helipads
- Helipad: Yes

Links
- Website: www.uduth.org.ng
- Lists: Hospitals in Nigeria

Usman Danfodiyo University Teaching Hospital is a public hospital located in Sokoto, Nigeria. It serves as a training institute for clinical students studying at Usman Danfodiyo University. Among other conditions, the hospital treats cases of kidney stones.

== History ==
The teaching hospital signed a Memorandum of Understanding with Urology and Nephrology Centre of Mansoura University in Egypt to commence kidney surgeries in the hospital in 2020. The Minister of Health commissioned the construction of Cardiothoracic centre, Brachytherapy center, and Nuclear medicine department, while the Intensive care unit upgraded in 2022.

== Administration ==
In 2018, Anas Ahmad Sabir was appointed as the Chief Medical Director for a four-year tenure by Mohammadu Buhari and was reappointed to the position in 2022 by the Federal Government of Nigeria.

== Achievements ==
The teaching hospital signed a Memorandum of Understanding with the Sokoto State Government in 2018 under which three consultants from UDUTH were assigned to three hospitals in the rural parts of Sokoto to cater to the needs of patients affected by the shortage of doctors. Their salaries were paid by the state government.

Free kidney surgeries were carried out by the teaching hospital in partnership with the National Association of Urological Surgeons (NAUS), in 2018.

== Controversy ==
In 2020, the Independent Corrupt Practices Commission(ICPC) investigated the embezzlement of over 250 million naira stolen by one of the accountants at UDUTH. In 2021 the federal high court in sokoto sentenced lukmanu Waziri, an accountant at usman Danfodiyo university for the embezzlement of 60 million naira diverted into private accounts including his accomplice, Monday Adejo through the Government Integrated Management Information System in 2021.

== Department ==
- GOPD Clinic
- MOPD Clinic
- SOPD Clinic
- Fed. Staff Clinic
- Surgery
- Anaesthesiology
- Neuro Surgery
- Radiology
- Nursing Services
- Medical Library
- Internal Medicine
- Family Medicine
- Community Medicine
- Obstetrics & Gynaecology
- Paeditrics
- Psychiatry
- ENT
- Dental
- Health Records
- MSSD
- Accident & Emergency
- Orthopaedic & Trauma
- Radiotherapy
- Ophthalmology
- Pharmacy
- CSSD
- CHC Kware
- CHC Arungungu.

== Schools ==
- School of Community Health (SOCH)
- School of Nursing
- School of Post Basic & Midwifery
- School of Health Information Management (SHIM)
- School of Post Basic Perioperative Nursing
- School of Post Basic Paediatrics Nursing

== Careers ==
1. Resident Doctors (Various Specialities)
2. Medical Officers
3. Pharmacists
4. Physiotherapists
5. Senior Nursing Officers
6. Nursing Officers II
