= Federal Neuro-Psychiatric Hospital, Maiduguri =

Federal Specialty Hospital in Nigeria

Coordinates: 11.86609°N 13.11819°E

Geography
- Location: Maiduguri, North East, Borno State, Nigeria

Organisation
- Type: General

Services
- Emergency department: Available

Links
- Website: fnphmaiduguri.gov.ng
- Lists: Hospitals in Nigeria

Federal Neuro-Psychiatric Hospital, Maiduguri is a federal government of Nigeria speciality hospital located in Maiduguri, Borno State, Nigeria. The current chief medical director is Ibrahim Abdu Wakawa.

== History ==
The hospital was established as part of Nigeria’s efforts to expand mental healthcare services across the country. It is one of several Federal Neuro-Psychiatric Hospitals in Nigeria, alongside facilities in Enugu, Calabar, Kaduna, Kware, and Benin City.

== Services ==
The hospital provides a range of mental health services, including:

- Diagnosis and treatment of psychiatric disorders
- Rehabilitation for individuals with substance abuse issues
- Research and training in mental health and neuroscience
- Community-based mental health outreach programs

== Administration ==
The hospital is managed by a Chief Medical Director (CMD), currently Dr. Ibrahim Abdu Wakawa. It operates under the Federal Ministry of Health (Nigeria) and aligns with the national mental health policies.

== Collaboration and Impact ==
FNPH Maiduguri plays a significant role in addressing mental health challenges worsened by insurgency in the region. It collaborates with the World Health Organization (WHO) to integrate mental health services into primary healthcare facilities. The hospital is also involved in rehabilitating former insurgents under the Nigerian government’s Operation Safe Corridor program.

=== Proposed construction of trauma center ===
The North East development commission has proposed to construct a trauma center at Federal Neuro-Psychiatric Hospital, Maiduguri in other to support victims of the bokoharam insurgency in the north east region to speed the recovery of the affected people.

== See also ==
- Mental health in Nigeria
- Federal Ministry of Health (Nigeria)
- List of hospitals in Nigeria

== CMD ==
The current chief medical director is Ibrahim Abdu Wakawa.
