= Regions Stroke and Neuroscience Hospital =

Geography
- Location: Lagos state, Nigeria
- Coordinates: 5.363849586168607°N 6.95813989489539°E

Organisation
- Type: Specialist

Links
- Lists: Hospitals in Nigeria

Regions Stroke and Neuroscience Hospital is a medical institution in Nigeria specializing in the diagnosis and treatment of neurological disorders. Established to enhance the availability of advanced neuroscience care in the country, the hospital offers specialized treatment for conditions such as stroke, epilepsy, Parkinson’s disease, memory disorders, Alzheimer’s disease, headaches, tremors, neuropathy, muscle weakness, back pain, brain tumors, and aneurysms. Its team of specialists has received advanced training in the United States and the United Kingdom and employs state-of-the-art technology and innovative treatment approaches comparable to those used in Western countries.

The hospital collaborates with various healthcare institutions, professionals, and organizations to improve neurological care in Nigeria. It is located at Km.17, Owerri-Port Harcourt Express Road, Mgbirichi Ohaji, Imo State.
