= Biu General Hospital =

Coordinates: 10.6111°N 12.195°E

Geography
- Location: Biu, Borno South, Borno State, Nigeria

Links
- Lists: Hospitals in Nigeria

General Hospital Biu is a government established hospital located in Sul-Umthla, Biu Local Government Area of Borno State, Nigeria. It provides medical and health care services to the community. It was established on 9/9/1976, and operates on 24 hours basis.

== Description ==
The Biu General Hospital was licensed by the Federal Ministry of Health with facility code 08/05/1/2/1/0001 as a Secondary Public Health Care Center.
