= Federal Medical Centre, Ikole Ekiti, Ekiti State =

Federal Medical Centre, Ikole Ekiti

Geography
- Location: Ekiti state, Nigeria
- Coordinates: 7.802114323539468°N 5.534104952582562°E

Organisation
- Type: General

Links
- Lists: Hospitals in Nigeria

The Federal Medical Centre, Ikole Ekiti is a government-owned tertiary healthcare institution located in Ikole Ekiti, Ekiti State, Nigeria. It provides specialized medical services, including diagnostics, treatment, and preventive care, to the residents of Ekiti State and its surrounding regions. The hospital is equipped with modern medical facilities and offers a range of departments, including internal medicine, surgery, pediatrics, obstetrics and gynecology, and emergency care. As part of Nigeria’s federal healthcare system, the center plays a crucial role in delivering quality and affordable healthcare services while also serving as a training ground for medical professionals.

== Advancement ==
The Federal Government of Nigeria has signed a Memorandum of Understanding (MoU) with the Ekiti State Government to upgrade the Ikole Ekiti Specialist Hospital to a Federal Medical Centre (FMC). This initiative aims to enhance healthcare accessibility and quality, particularly in remote areas. Minister of State for Health, Dr. Tunji Alausa, emphasized that the upgrade aligns with President Bola Tinubu’s commitment to democratizing healthcare.

Governor Biodun Oyebanji expressed gratitude for the approval, highlighting that the FMC would provide advanced medical services, attract skilled healthcare professionals, and stimulate local economic growth. Traditional rulers and state officials lauded the development, noting its potential to boost healthcare infrastructure, create job opportunities, and improve overall well-being in the region.
