= Abimbola Owoade =

Nigerian traditional ruler (born 1975)

Abimbola Akeem Owoade I
- Aláàfin ti Ọ̀yọ́; Ikú Bàbá Yèyé
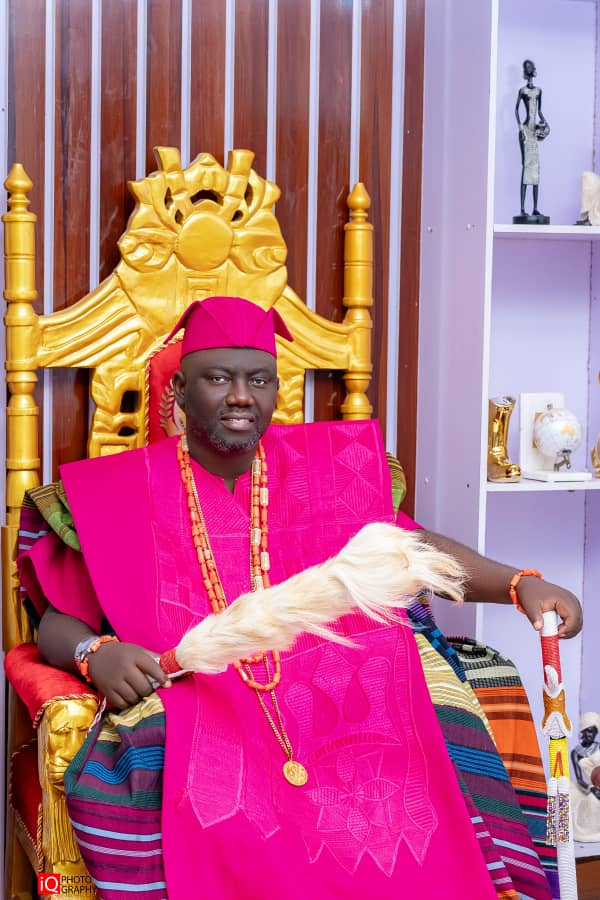

Alaafin of Oyo
- Reign: 13 January 2025 – present
- Coronation: 5 April 2025
- Predecessor: Lamidi Adeyemi III
- Born: Abimbola Akeem Owoade; 17 July 1975 (age 50); Akure, Western State (now Ondo State), Nigeria
- Spouse: Olori Abiwumi Owoade
Names
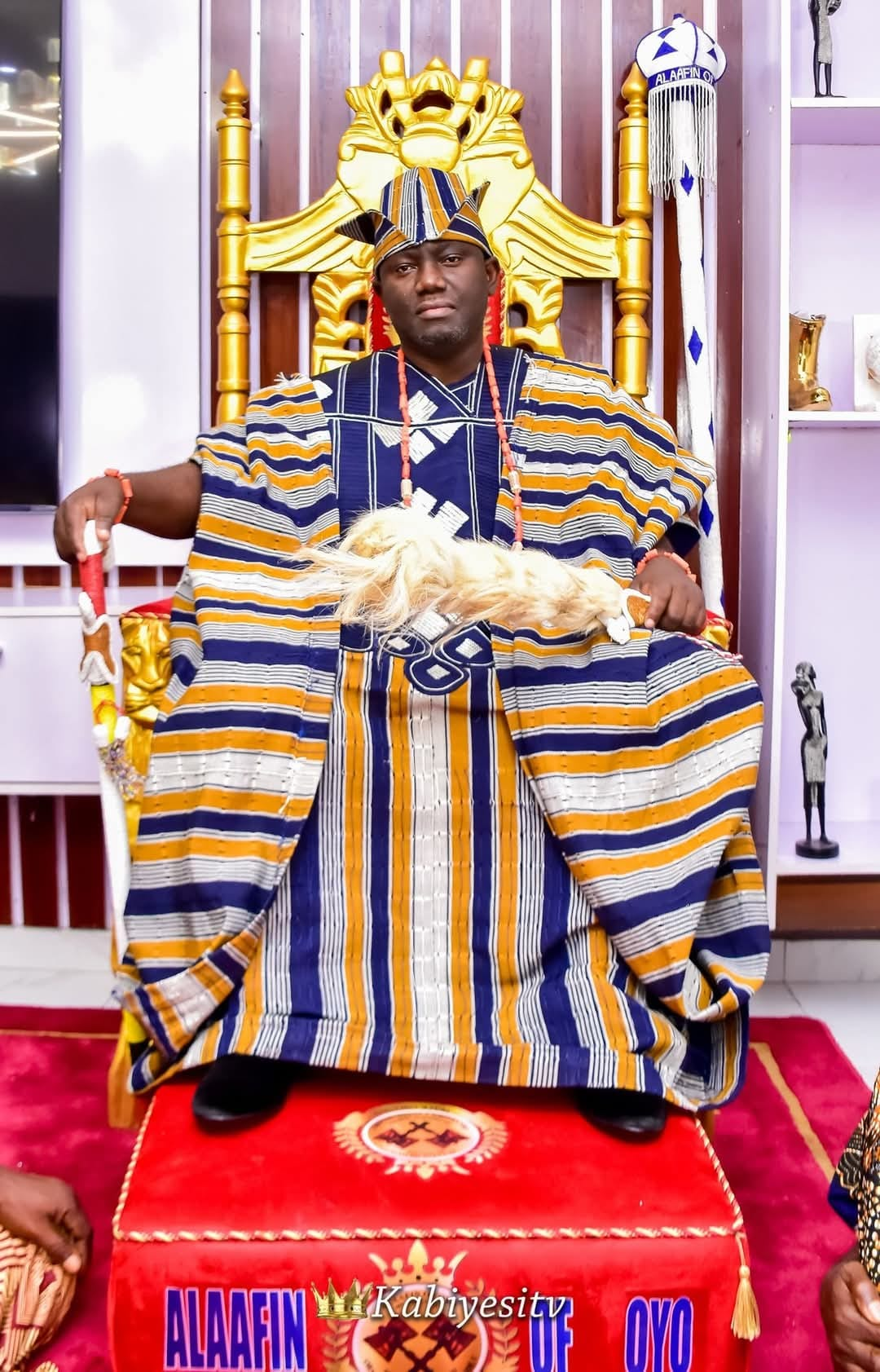
- Abimbola Akeem Owoade

Abimbola Owoade I (born 17 July 1975) is the 46th Alaafin, or traditional ruler, of the Yoruba town of Oyo and rightful heir to the throne of its historic empire.

== Early life and education ==
Abimbola Owoade was born into the royal family of Owoade-Agunloye, Agure Compound, Oyo Town, Oyo State to Rasaki Ibiyosi Owoade. Owoade is a paternal great-grandson of Alaafin Lawani Agogoja through his paternal grandfather Aderounmu Iyanda Owoade (who was a brother of Alaafin Ladigbolu I). Thus, he is a member of the Agunloye royal house as a great-great grandson of Alaafin Agunloye, and is a direct descendant of Alaafin Atiba.

In 1992, he completed his Senior Secondary School Certificate Examination (SSCE) at Baptist High School, Saki, Oyo State. He studied Mechanical Engineering at The Federal Polytechnic, Ilaro, Ogun State (1994–1997), and The Polytechnic, Ibadan, Oyo State (1999–2001), earning an Ordinary National Diploma (OND) and a Higher National Diploma (HND), respectively. He later moved to the United Kingdom, where he attended the University of Sunderland and Northumbria University, earning a Bachelor of Science and a Master of Science in Mechanical Engineering in 2008 and 2012, respectively.

== Career ==
Abimbola Owoade's career began in 2002 as a corps member of the National Youth Service Corps (NYSC), serving as a Mechanical Intern/Planner with the Nigeria Gas Company. He worked briefly with Oceanic Bank Plc as a teller from 2003 to 2004. He later relocated to the U.K., where he earned certification as a Project Manager after completing his degrees. Before being selected as Alaafin, he most recently worked as a project coordinator at Manitoba Hydro in Winnipeg, Canada.

== Ascendancy ==
Since the demise of Oba Lamidi Olayiwola Adeyemi III on 22 April 2022, the selection process for a replacement has been contentious. In May 2023, some royal families protested what they described as their exclusion from the process. In January 2025, another faction warned the Oyo State Government against interfering in the selection process due to a pending court case.

However, on 10 January 2025, the Governor of Oyo State, Seyi Makinde, approved the selection of Abimbola Owoade to succeed his second cousin twice-removed, (as they are both male line descendants of Alaafin Atiba) the late Oba Lamidi III. On 13 January, the state governor presented a certificate and staff of office to the new traditional ruler. He was crowned on 5 April 2025.
