= Federal Neuro-Psychiatric Hospital, Kaduna =

Federal Specialty Hospital in Nigeria

Geography
- Location: Barnawa, Kaduna State, Nigeria

Links
- Website: fnphkaduna.gov.ng
- Lists: Hospitals in Nigeria

Federal Neuro-Psychiatric Hospital, Kaduna, is a federal government of Nigeria speciality hospital located in Barnawa, Kaduna State, Nigeria. The current CMD is Dr. Aishatu Yushau Armaya'u.

== History ==
Federal Neuro-Psychiatric Hospital, Kaduna, was established in 1975. The hospital was formerly known as Psychiatric Hospital Kakuri. The institution was one of 52 federal hospitals to receive a 60 billion intervention from the federal government during the COVID-19 pandemic in 2022. Aside from the federal government intervention, the hospital was also supported by the Kaduna state governor, who launched the coronavirus intervention building, named after professor Jika in 2023.

== Facilities and programs ==
The psychiatric hospital in Kaduna caters for mental health of indigenes as stated by the former chief medical director Professor Abdulkareem Jika Yusuf at the Mental Health Day in 2019.

In February 2024, Federal Neuro-Psychiatric Hospital, Kaduna, collaborated with the Federal Road Safety Corps (FRSC), Kaduna, to carry out a compulsory mental health assessment for all motorists in the state, an initiative to reduce the number of road accidents.

Also, in February 2024, a toxicology ward was created in the hospital, a facility to cater for patients with substance abuse and drug disorder. The ward also differentiates the other mental issues from those caused by drug misuse, drug abuse and substance disorder.

=== Climate change ===
Owing to climate change weather conditions, the chief medical director of the hospital Dr Aisha yushau proposed planting 1000 trees in the hospital facility.

== Services ==
- Emergency psychiatry service
- Child and adolescent psychiatry service
- Forensics psychiatry service
- Substance abuse treatment and rehabilitation
- General psychiatric service
- Mental health clinic
- Community outreach psychiatry service
- Social work services
- Occupational therapy services
- psychological service
- Drug Rehabilitation services
- Molecular laboratory services
- Diagnostic laboratory services
- amenities care service.

=== Other specialized services are ===
- electroencephalography (EEG)
- Mental health Research and training
- Electrocardiography (ECG)
- Intensive care.
