= Benue State University Teaching Hospital =

Nigerian teaching hospital

Geography
- Location: 3 Makurdi-Gboko Rd, Walmayo, Makurdi 97010, Benue, Nigeria
- Coordinates: 7.7252404°N 8.5684491°E

Organisation
- Type: Public, Multi-Specialty Teaching Hospital
- Affiliated university: Benue State University

Services
- Emergency department: Yes
- Beds: 400

Helipads
- Helipad: Yes

Links
- Website: bsuth.org.ng
- Lists: Hospitals in Nigeria

Benue State University Teaching Hospital is a state government owned hospital located in Benue. It serves as a training institute for clinical student studying at Benue State University. The hospital attend to cases of cancer, delivery of children, mpox. The hospital has a working morgue to keep decreased patients.

== History ==
In 2023, BSUTH took the full control of the Muhammadu Buhari Mother and Child Hospital located in Makurdi to provide antenatal care and ease the comfort of patients who needs care within the state. Two billion naira was donated by Hyacinth Alia to the cancer centre of the Benue state university teaching hospital in 2024. The teaching hospital obtained equipments to carry out scarless fibroid surgery in April, 2024. In September 2024, new diagnostic equipment were purchased by the hospital management with the support of the state government to cater for the patients. The number of staffs recruited into the hospital are 400 including 60 Doctors and 140 nurses. In December, 2024, BSUTH signed a Memorandum of Understanding with the Benue State Emergency Management Agency to provide urgent medical treatment to Internally Displaced people living in the state. Pensioners in the state were offered free treatment at the hospital in 2025 as part of the state government effort to assist retired civil servants.

== Administration ==
Terlumun Swende was the second Chief Medical Director appointed by the teaching hospital in 2017. Stephen Hwande was appointed as the Chief Medical Director of the teaching hospital in 2023 by the state Governor, Hyacinth Alia.

== Achievement ==
The Benue State Government facilitated the collaboration between the BSUTH and the Shanghai Haitian Hospital in early 2024 for an exchange program to improve the clinical and academics of the medical student in the Benue State University. Cytology equipment were obtained to tackle cervical cancer treatment in BSUTH. The teaching hospital recorded the first in-vitro fertilization in 2025 with 25 others scheduled for the process as well.

In January 2025, Benue State University Teaching Hospital (BSUTH) recorded its first successful IVF deliveries, resulting in the birth of three babies. The procedures were carried out at the Muhammadu Buhari Mother and Child Hospital, an annex of BSUTH, and were offered at a subsidized cost. The hospital also began offering free medical services to certified pensioners in the state, covering consultations and admissions.

== Controversy ==
The management of the teaching hospital sacked 40 doctors due to the fear of COVID'19 outbreak, this action was frowned and got the disapproval of The Association of Resident Doctors, (TARD) Benue State Chapter who considered the sack letter illegal and against residency law.
