= General Hospital Potiskum =

Potiskum Specialist Hospital

Geography
- Location: Potiskum, South, Yobe State, Nigeria

History
- Former name: General Hospital Potiskum
- Opened: 1969

Links
- Lists: Hospitals in Nigeria

General Hospital Potiskum is a public hospital, located in Potiskum, Potiskum Local Government Area, Yobe State, Nigeria. It was established in 1969 and operates on 24hours basis. It was upgraded to a Specialist Hospital in the year 2022.

== Description ==
The General Hospital Potiskum was licensed by the Federal Ministry of Health with facility code 35/14/1/2/1/0001 and registered as Secondary Health Care Centre.

== Departments ==
- Accident and Emergency Unit
- Maternity Unit
- General Out Patient Department (GOPD)
- Special Baby Care Unit (S.C.B.U)
- Isolation Center
- Ante Natal Care (A.N.C)
- Female Ward Surgical
- Male Ward Medical
