= Federal Neuro-Psychiatric Hospital, Enugu =

Federal Specialty Hospital in Nigeria

Geography
- Location: Enugu, Enugu State, Nigeria

Organisation
- Type: Teaching

Services
- Emergency department: Available

History
- Construction started: 1962

Links
- Website: fnhe.gov.ng
- Lists: Hospitals in Nigeria

Federal Neuro-Psychiatric Hospital, Enugu is a federal government of Nigeria speciality hospital located in Enugu, Enugu State, Nigeria. The current chief medical director is Monday Igwe.

== History ==
Federal Neuro-Psychiatric Hospital, Enugu was established on 1962. The hospital was formerly an Outpatient Unit.

== CMD ==
The former chief medical director is Monday Igwe.

The current chief medical director of Federal Neuro-Psychiatric Hospital, Calabar is DR Ngozichukwu Nneka Nnaogu.

== Donation ==
There was a donation of mental health relief materials and drug to the Neuro-Psychiatric Hospital.
