= Reuben Eifediyi =

Nigerian professor and consultant obstetrician and gynecologist

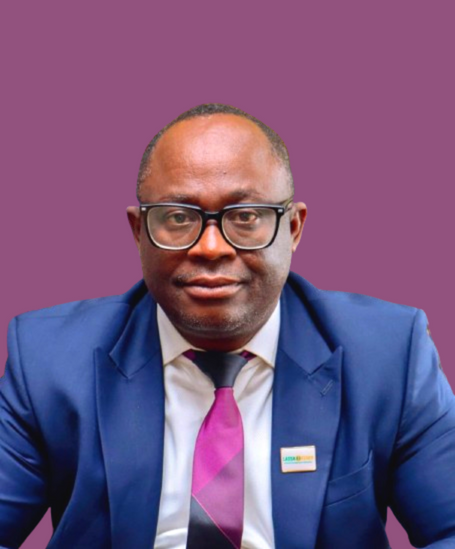
Image of Reuben Eifediyi

Reuben Agbons Eifediyi is a Nigerian professor and consultant obstetrician and gynecologist. He is currently the Chief Medical Director of Irrua Specialist Teaching Hospital, Edo State. He is a Fellow of the West African College of Surgeons, National Postgraduate Medical College, and the International College of Surgeons. Prior to his appointment as CMD, he served as chairman, Medical Advisory Committee of the hospital.
