= List of hospitals in Kano =

List of hospitals and medical centres in Kano State, Nigeria.

Name	Location
Aminu Kano Teaching Hospital	Tarauni
Infectious Disease Hospital	Fagge
General Hospital Bichi	Bichi
General Hospital Dambatta	Dambatta
General Hospital Dawakin Tofa	Dawakin Tofa
Abubakar Imam Urology Centre	Fagge
General Hospital Gwarzo	Gwarzo
General Hospital Wudil	Wudil
Gwagwarwa Comprehensive Clinic	Nassarawa
Muhammad Abdullahi Wase Teaching Hospital	Nassarawa
Muhammad Buhari Specialist Hospital	Nassarawa
Murtala Muhammad Specialist Hospital	Kano Municipal
National Orthopaedic Hospital, Dala	Dala
Nigeria Customs Service Medical Centre	Fagge
Nigerian Law School Medical Centre	Bebeji
Nuhu Bamalli Maternity Clinic	Kano Municipal
Hasiya Bayero Pediatric Hospital	Kano Municipal
Gwarzo General Hospital	Gwarzo
Aurora Specialist Hospital	Tarauni, Hotoro G.R.A.
Makkah Specialist Eye hospital	Gwale
Warshu Hospital	Ungogo
UMC Zhahir Hospital	KanoUMC Zhahir Hospital
National Orthopaedic Hospital	Dala
