= Federal University Teaching Hospital Wukari =

Nigerian teaching hospital

Geography
- Location: General Hospital, Wukari 670102, Taraba, Nigeria

Organisation
- Type: Public, Multi-Specialty Teaching Hospital
- Affiliated university: Federal University, Wukari

Services
- Emergency department: Yes

Helipads
- Helipad: Yes

Links
- Lists: Hospitals in Nigeria

Federal University Teaching Hospital Wukari is a public hospital located in Taraba State. It is affiliated with Federal University, Wukari. The Acting Chief Medical Director of the teaching hospital is Daniel Zanyu Egah.

== History ==
On September 26, 2022, the federal government of Nigeria released a memo to effect the establishment of FUTHW to serve as a training institute for medical and other allied courses at Federal University, Wukari.

== Administration ==
Madachi Dauda Ayuba was appointed as the Chief Medical Director of the teaching hospital in 2024 which sparked different opinions and reactions from the youth of Taraba State. In his stead, Daniel Zanyu Egah was appointed as the Acting Chief Medical Director of the teaching hospital until the issue is resolved.

== Controversy ==
Some youth groups in Taraba State condemned the selection of Madachi Dauda Ayuba as the Chief Medical Director in the teaching hospital as not out of merit with focus on favouritism. However, the southern Taraba Youth Group countered the opposition and supported the appointment of the CMD with their argument focused on the dedication of Ayuba to healthcare in the state.

== Project ==
The North East development commission in August 2024 installed a solar light across the teaching hospital as one of the major projects for the hospital.
