= Borno State Specialist Hospital, Maiduguri =

Geography
- Location: Maiduguri, Borno Central, Borno State, Nigeria

History
- Opened: March 2, 1928

Links
- Lists: Hospitals in Nigeria

Borno State Specialist Hospital, Maiduguri, is a public hospital in Zango, Maiduguri, Borno State, Nigeria. It was established in 1928, and operates on a 24 hour basis.

== Description ==
The Borno State Specialist Hospital, Maiduguri was licensed by the Federal Ministry of Health with facility code 08/21/1/1/1/0024 and registered as Secondary Health Care Center.

== Services ==
The Maiduguri State Specialist Hospital offers the following medical services:

- Cardiology
- Gastroenterology
- Nephrology
- Dermatology
- Hematology
- Geriatrics
- Neurology
- Infectious diseases
- Psychiatry / Behavioral medicine
- General surgery
- Orthopedic surgery
- Urology
- Anesthesia
- Radiology
- Pediatric surgery
- Pathology
- Antenatal care (ANC)
- Immunization
- HIV / AIDS services
- Tuberculosis
- Non-communicable diseases
- Family planning
- Hepatitis
- Accidents and emergency
- Nutrition
- Health education and community mobilization
- Obstetrics
