= African Medical Centre of Excellence =

African Medical Centre of Excellence (AMCE)

Geography
- Location: Abuja, Federal Capital Territory, Nigeria

Organisation
- Type: Multi-specialty

History
- Founded: 2025

Links
- Website: www.amce.net
- Lists: Hospitals in Nigeria
- African Medical Centre of Excellence
- Location: Apo-Kabusa Road, Wumba District, FCT Abuja
- Built: 2025

African Medical Centre of Excellence (AMCE) is a quaternary-level multi-speciality medical institution developed by the African Export–Import Bank (Afreximbank) and King's College Hospital, London, referred to locally and by staff simply as "AMCE".

== Facilities ==
The hospital is situated on Apo-Kabusa Road, Wumba District, Abuja. It currently has 170 beds with a plan to expand this to 500 beds.

== Medical ==
Facilities include inpatient and outpatient services across its specialties; oncology, cardiovascular services, haematology, and general medical and surgical services.

== Media ==
The hospital features in Arise News's documentary Afreximbank launch AMCE Abuja. The documentary focuses on the hospital's impact on reducing brain drain and medical tourism in Africa.

== See also ==
- List of hospitals in Nigeria
