= Darlington Obaseki =

Nigerian professor

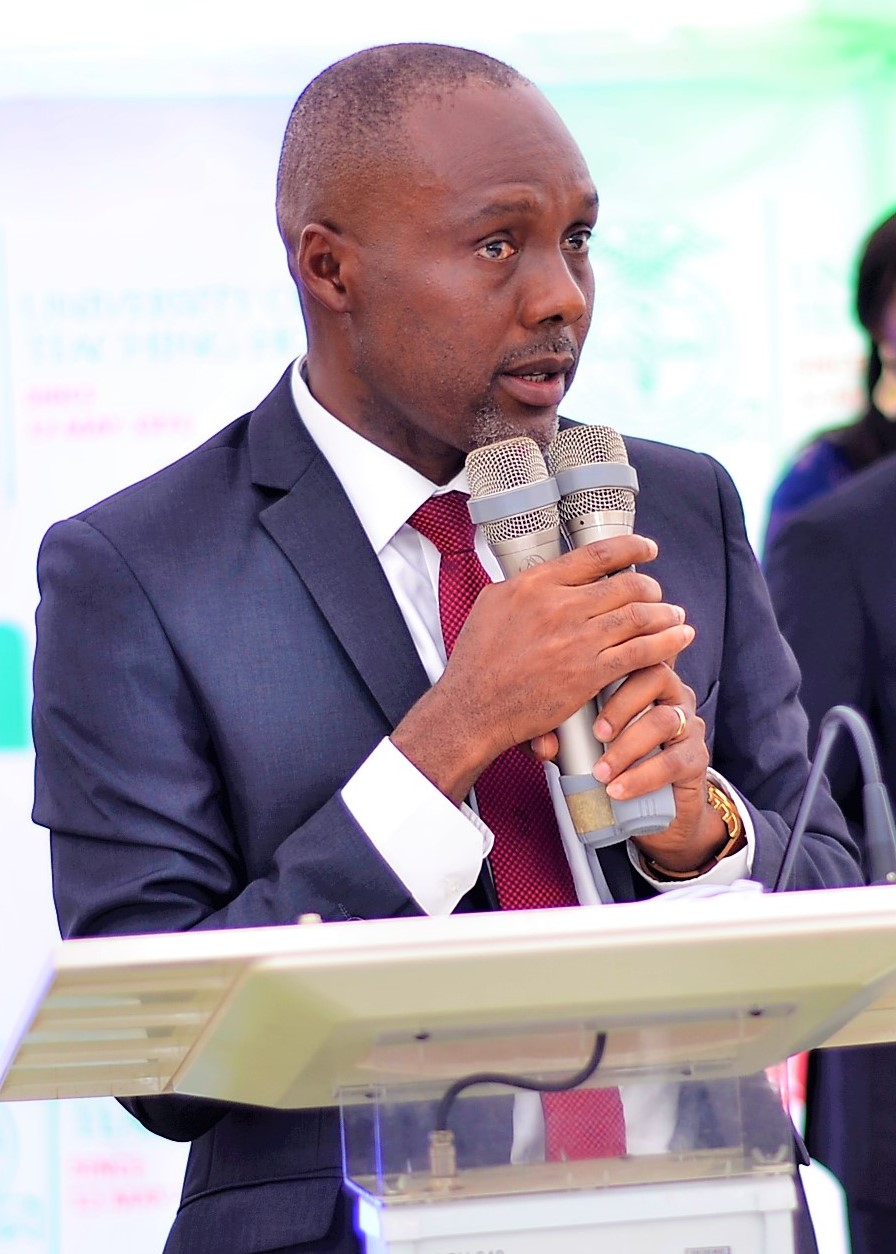
- Darlington Obaseki at the 2019 UBTH Inaugural Founders Day Celebration.
- Born: Darlington Ewaen Obaseki; January 1, 1968 (age 58); Benin City, Edo State, Nigeria
- Education: University of Benin
- Spouse: Chigozie Obaseki
- Children: 3
- Scientific career
- Fields: Histopathology

Darlington Ewaen Obaseki (born 1 January 1968) is a Nigerian professor of histopathology who served as the chief medical director of the University of Benin Teaching Hospital, Benin City, from 2017 to 2025.

Obaseki is an alumnus of the University of Benin School of Medicine. He is a gastrointestinal pathologist who has completed post-fellowship training at University Hospital Basel and Leeds General Infirmary. He has also received management training both locally and internationally, at the Administrative Staff College of Nigeria and the Galilee International Management Institute in Israel.

== Background ==
Obaseki was born on 1 January 1968 in Benin City, Nigeria. He attended Ezomo Primary School (1974–1980) and Asoro Grammar School (1980–1985), both in Benin City. Obaseki proceeded into the University of Benin in 1985 where he received a Bachelor of Medicine and Surgery (MBBS) degree in 1991.

== Medical career ==
After completing his housemanship programme in 1992 at the Central Hospital, Benin City, and the subsequent mandatory one-year National Youth Service Corps (NYSC) programme in 1993 at the Peretorogbene Health Centre, Rivers State, Obaseki worked as a medical officer at Ituah Hospital, Festac Town, Lagos State, from 1995 to 2001.

In 2001, Obaseki was admitted as a registrar in the Department of Pathology at the University of Benin Teaching Hospital. He completed the training programme in 2006, having passed the Part II and Part I fellowship examinations of the West African College of Physicians (2004), and the National Postgraduate Medical College of Nigeria (2006) respectively.

In 2007, Obaseki was appointed as an honorary consultant in the Department of Pathology at the University of Benin Teaching Hospital, following his appointment as a lecturer in the Department of Pathology at the University of Benin. Obaseki rose to the position of professor of pathology in October 2017, after a decade of scientific contributions in the field of medicine. He has attended numerous scientific conferences both within and outside Nigeria and has also presented articles and abstracts in these conferences.

=== Chief Medical Director ===
Obaseki was appointed as the 6th Chief Medical Director of the University of Benin Teaching Hospital on 17 August 2017, after serving in an acting capacity for about a month. Prior to this appointment, he had served in other executive roles, including Acting Chairman, Medical Advisory Committee (2017); Deputy Chairman, Medical Advisory Committee (2014–2016); and Coordinator, UBTH Cancer Registry (since 2014).

During Obaseki's administration, several technological advancements were introduced at the hospital, and his campaign for early referral of cases contributed to addressing some of the health challenges previously experienced by the institution.

== Personal life ==
Obaseki is married to Mrs Chigozie Obaseki, a physiotherapist, and they have three children. He is a Christian and a sports enthusiast, particularly of football, and plays for the Nigeria Medical Association All-Stars Football Club, UBTH. Obaseki is open-minded and takes an interest in the progress of those around him.

== Publications ==
Obaseki has authored and co-authored several medical and scientific research publications in the field of medicine, both locally and internationally.

== See also ==
- University of Benin Teaching Hospital (List of Chief Medical Director)
