= Egbe =

Yoruba town in central Nigeria

Coordinates: 8°13′9.36″N 5°30′23.85″E

Ẹgbẹ Mẹkun, popularly called Ẹgbẹ, is a historic town located in the Yagba West local government area of Kogi State and Ekiti local government area of Kwara State in Nigeria.

== History ==
This town is an ancient town bordering Kogi and Kwara States. It is surrounded by some undulating and luxuriant hills of savannah vegetation which are visible as you move around the town; this explained why it is sometimes referred to as "Jerusalem in Nigeria". The dialect spoken by these people is called Yagba, they have ancestry root linked to the Yorubas in Nigeria as they speak Yoruba. Their alphabet are similar to that of Yorubas. The town is known for its hospitality and the fact that it is located on the federal road axis, it serves as a central location to access other communities. It is one of the biggest towns found in Yagba land with long history of commercial activities; People come from far and near for trading purposes. Egbe is known for its ancestral songs called the oriki that shed light on their ancestors and their various clans, like the Anyanyin, Apoto, Oke-disin, Owa, Iloko, Oke Egbe and a few other clans.

Egbe town is blessed with fertile land for agriculture activities. The crops grown in this area include: yam, corn, sorghum, cocoa, beans, cassava, (groundnuts) and cotton. Traditionally, they go into clothes woven which are used during wedding ceremonies especially for the brides. The characteristic of the town include being quiet and having a natural environment which is most conducive for learning. No wonder in Egbe and indeed the entire region of Yagba in Kogi State, it is hard to cover a 500 metres radius without coming across an educational institution. Again it is not surprising that some of the best brains in Nigeria are products of educational institutions in this impressive region. Cassiterite, columbite, and tantalite are some of the mineral resources found in Egbe.

The family unit is an integral part of this community, as marriage is encouraged within the younger populace by the elderly. The existence of the extended family is still being practiced; where the younger ones care for the elderly by living together as a family unit. Respect for the elderly is of great importance to the younger ones and is encouraged. The presence of missionary activities in this town dates back to the early twentieth century when Rev. Tommy Titcombe (a British-born Canadian missionary) and his wife a missionary with SIM (Sudan Interior Mission; now Serving In Mission) came to Egbe in 1908. Against all the odds of the language barrier (they would later learn both Yoruba and the Yagba dialect) and West Africa being referred to as the "White man’s grave" (due to malaria caused by mosquito bites killing so many missionaries) they came into the community, becoming the pioneers of Christianity in the area; they preached the gospel of Christ to the people of Egbe and Yagba and were able to lay the foundation for a hospital which was started by newer missionaries in 1952. Known today as ECWA Hospital Egbe, the hospital, founded by Canadian missionaries Dr. George and Esther Campion has become one of the biggest, most popular and most successful Christian hospitals in Kogi State and Nigeria at large. A college of excellence was also established called Titcombe College, (named after Titcombe) and many churches were also planted. Egbe still has traditional Nigerian leadership positions, such as "Oba" "Baale" "Bashorun", which are king, chief (king's deputy) and prime minister. The Bashorun of Egbe is Chief Olayinka Simoyan, (former Nigerian diplomat). The former Oba of Egbe, who was a paramount ruler, Oba S. K. Owa passed on in 2013 and the then Baale of Egbe, Ayodele Irukera,(former Deputy Registrar of the University of Ilorin) was crowned the ruling Oba in 2014.

Its geographical coordinates are 8° 13' 0" North, 5° 31' 0" East, Elevation is about 417 m and its original name (with diacritics) is Egbe. Population of approximately 20,000
