= Federal Neuro-Psychiatric Hospital, Kware =

Federal Specialty Hospital in Nigeria

Geography
- Location: Kware, Northern, Sokoto State, Nigeria
- Coordinates: 13.2082°N 5.2640°E

Organisation
- Type: Specialist

Services
- Emergency department: Available

Links
- Lists: Hospitals in Nigeria

Federal Neuro-Psychiatric Hospital, Kware is a federal government of Nigeria speciality hospital located in Kware, Sokoto State, Nigeria. The current chief medical director is Shehu Sale.

The hospital commences Rehabilitation for drug addict in there woman and children drug dependent center which is commission in 2019.

== CMD ==
The current chief medical director is Shehu Sale.

== Sensitization ==
The federal Federal Neuro-Psychiatric Hospital, Kware embark on community outreach sensitization to the public to create more awareness on mental health.

=== Construction ===
There is construction of emergency clinics in the hospital in order to improve the emergency service.
