= Federal Neuro-Psychiatric Hospital, Calabar =

Federal Specialty Hospital in Nigeria

Geography
- Location: Calabar, Cross River State, Nigeria

Links
- Website: fnphcalabar.gov.ng
- Lists: Hospitals in Nigeria

Federal Neuro-Psychiatric Hospital, Calabar, founded in 1903, is the oldest mental health institution in Nigeria. It is a federal government of Nigeria speciality hospital located in Calabar, Cross River State, Nigeria. The chief medical director is Dr Emmanuel Aniekan Essien.

== History ==
Federal Neuro-Psychiatric Hospital, Calabar was established on 1903.

== Services ==
The service in Federal Neuro-Psychiatric Hospital, Calabar are;

- Health care giver program
- Ambulance service
- Laboratory services
- consultancy
- ICU
- Advanced Radiography services
- occupational therapy
- Outpost.

== CMD ==
The current Medical director is Dr Emmanuel Aniekan Essien. Prior to his appointment, some doctors have occupied that seat including:

Dr Theophilus Osim Onyuku: 2024 - 2025

Dr Bassey Eyo Edet: 2019 - 2024

Dr Esien E. Ekpe: 2019 - 2019

Dr Joseph Bassey Okegbe: 2011 - 2019

Dr Sunday Timothy Babatunde: 2007 - 2011

Dr Michael Ekpo (pioneer Medical Director): 1998 - 2006

== Top Management Committee ==
The Top Management Committee (TMC) of the Federal Neuro-Psychiatric Hospital (FNPH) Calabar includes the following members:

1. Dr. Emmanuel Aniekan Essien - Acting Medical Director

2. Dr Roger Abang - Acting Head of Clinical Services

3. Barr Edim Osadim Odey- Director of Administration

4. Ms. Rebecca Effiom Ibiang - Deputy Director and Head, Finance & Accounts

5. Elder Mrs Obo Mesembe Edet, Human Resources

6. Mrs. Eneanwan Iwok - Assistant Director and Head, Nursing Services

7. Mr. Kingsley Enang - Coordinator, School of Post Basic & Mental Health Nursing

8. Mrs. Helen Eyitayo Agbor - Secretariat
