= Alex Ekwueme Federal Teaching Hospital =

Nigerian teaching hospital

Coordinates: 6°19′57″N 8°6′29″E

Geography
- Location: A343, Ntezi Abba, Ebonyi, Abakaliki, Nigeria

Organisation
- Type: Public, Multi-Specialty Teaching Hospital
- Affiliated university: Alex Ekwueme Federal University Ndufu Alike Ikwo

Services
- Emergency department: Yes

Links
- Website: aefutha.gov.ng
- Lists: Hospitals in Nigeria

Alex Ekwueme Federal Teaching Hospital is a Nigerian public hospital formerly known as Federal Teaching Hospital Abakaliki. It serves as a training institute for clinical students studying at Alex Ekwueme Federal University Ndufu Alike.

== History ==
In 2019, Alex Ekwueme Federal University was granted the approval by the federal government of Nigeria to convert Federal Hospital Abakaliki to a teaching hospital to train medical students studying in the school. The change of name to Alex Ekwueme Federal Teaching Hospital was to honour the late vice president of Nigeria Ekwueme who ruled between 1979 and 1983, and died in 2017. To set up the hospital, the Independent Corrupt Practices and Other Related Offences Commission donated 150 million naira to support the establishment of the teaching hospital.

== Medical achievement ==
In June 2025, the Alex Ekwueme Federal University Teaching Hospital Abakaliki (AE-FUTHA) recorded its first successful in-vitro fertilization (IVF) delivery of triplets. The procedure resulted in the birth of two boys and a girl via caesarean section. This marked a significant milestone for the hospital, positioning it as one of the few tertiary institutions in southeastern Nigeria to achieve such a feat. According to reports, the hospital’s IVF center had achieved a 70% success rate within its initial batch of procedures, which included multiple singleton and twin births. The achievement was viewed as a step forward in improving access to advanced reproductive healthcare services in the region.

== Administration ==
In 2019, Emeka Onwe-Ogah was re-appointed as the chief medical director of the teaching hospital for a 4-year tenure in office. This was before the hospital was converted to a teaching hospital of which he still remained as the CMD after the hospital changed from Federal Teaching Hospital Abakaliki to Alex Ekwueme Federal University Teaching Hospital.

The present chief medical director of the teaching hospital is Prof. Robinson Chukwudi Onoh. He was appointed in 2023 by the President Bola Ahmed Tinubu.

== Controversy ==
The school management banned illegal means of earning money especially ponzi schemes and placed a sanction on staff caught engaging in such act in 2019.

== Donation ==
An oxygen plant was donated by the United Nations International Children's Fund (UNICEF), in partnership with IHS Towers and the Government of Canada. The oxygen plant which was inaugurated by Governor Francis Nwifuru, will produce 6000 liters of oxygen daily.

== Departments ==
Administration

Clinical Services

Office of the CMD

Public Relations

== Schools ==
School of Nursing

School of Midwifery

Internship Training

Industrial Training (SIWES)
