= ECWA Hospital Egbe =

- Serving In Mission

Geography
- Location: Egbe, Kogi State, Nigeria
- Coordinates: 8.213254°N 5.517783°E

Organisation
- Type: General

Services
- Emergency department: Yes
- Beds: 121

History
- Former name: Sudan Interior Mission
- Opened: 1926

Links
- Website: egbehospital.org
- Lists: Hospitals in Nigeria

ECWA Hospital Egbe is a Christian hospital located in Egbe, Kogi State, Nigeria. It has 121 beds, and was SIM's first training hospital.

== History ==
The hospital was founded by Rev. Tommy Titcombe and his wife, Ethel McIntosh, (a British-born Canadian Missionary), on behalf of Serving In Mission (SIM) from the United States, Canada, and the UK.

The couple arrived in Egbe shortly before Christmas 1915, on their honeymoon. On Christmas day, the couple saved a woman giving birth to twins from being killed by a medicine man. Ethel decided to start a small maternity center in their house, which became the genesis of ECWA Hospital Egbe.

In 1925, they built a maternity clinic with Christian converts' support, which was completed in 1926.

Rev. and Mrs. Titcombe, who had no formal medical training, worked hard to sustain the hospital until 1951. By 1950, Egbe residents had a positive response to the medical services, leading to an immediate need for trained personnel. Rev. Titcombe consulted with Dr. George Campion in 1949, who agreed to come to Egbe after his medical training. Campion and his wife, who returned home in 1958, marked the transition of the hospital to one of the largest, most popular, and most successful in Kogi State. He initiated the construction of several buildings, including the main building housing, autoclave room, operation theatre, doctor's offices, Outpatients Department, patients' waiting room, card room, Ward A, and laboratory. In 1965, he added a central supply room, administration, pharmacy, cashiers, and accounts. In 1971, he built three pastor's offices, dedicated to Dr. Janet Troupe, who died while treating Lassa fever patients.

== ECWA School of Nursing and ECWA School of Midwifery ==
Dr. Campion established a Nursing Training School (NTS, now ECWA School of Nursing, Egbe) in 1955. The government's approval was not secured until 1957. ECWA Nursing Training School was the first in Kogi and Kwara for many years. ECWA School of Midwifery, Egbe was established in 1977 as Midwives Training School and since has been graduating midwives who practice in Nigeria and abroad.

== Medical staff ==
- Dr. Benjamin Kakule Malikidogo, surgeon, head of surgery, medical director
- Dr. Hanson Chidi Otuneme, general surgeon, acting clinical services director
- Dr. Oguntoye Oladapo Stephen, consultant, family physician, head of department, Family Medicine Residency Program
- Dr. Osuji, Nnamdi Thaddeus, senior registrar II
- Dr. Layode Ibukun Israel, senior registrar II
- Dr. Ifede Chukwuanugo Jeremiah, medical officer
- Dr. Achebe Emmanuel, doctor of optometry, National Youth Service
- Komolafe, Grace A., manager, Clinical Support Services
- Lawal, Niyi Ademola, head of department, Pharmacy
- Iloabuchi Loveline Nneka, head of department, Medical Laboratory
- Carine Malikidogo, head of department, Physiotherapy
- Nurse Adeyemi, Olowoniyi Iyabo, nursing manager
- Aworo, Ayodele John, matron, Male/Surgical Ward
- Miss Yusuf Idowu, head of department, Female/Pediatric Ward
- Nurse. David Caroline Funmise, head of department, Emergency Room
- Nurse Ologun Seunayo Abigail, head of department, Intensive Care Unit (ICU)
- Stephen Jumoke Ololade, head of department, Operating Theater
- Olatunji Funmilayo Mary, head of department, Maternity
- Oyawale Olushola Elijah, head of department, Dental Clinic
- Oyedele Ayodeji Kayode, head of department, X-Ray Unit
- Okunrinmeta, Emmanuel Mayokun, head of department, Health Information Management
- Pastor Alabi, Julius Taiye, manager, Spring of Life HIV/AIDS Center

== Departments ==
- Administration
- Account
- Pharmacy
- Operating Room (theatre unit)
- Radiology (X-ray)
- Outpatient Department
- Laboratory
- Ward A (female medical ward)
- Ward C (children's ward)
- Male Surgery Ward
- Maternity
- Under fives' Clinic, Antenatal and Family Planning Clinic
- Eye Centre
- Maintenance
- Evangelism
- HIV/AIDS Counselling Clinic
