= Orishejolomi Thomas =

Nigerian academic

Professor Horatio Oritsejolomi Thomas
- Born: 1917; Sapele
- Died: 1979 (aged 61–62); Onboard Lagos - Warri
- Citizenship: Nigerian
- Education: University of Birmingham
- Known for: Tropical Medicine
- Awards: Memorial Lecture
- Scientific career
- Fields: Surgery Tropical Medicine
- Workplaces: University of Lagos; Vice Chancellor University of Ibadan

Professor Horatio Oritsejolomi Thomas (1917–1979), was a Nigerian medical pioneer, specialising in facial reconstructive and plastic surgery. He trained as an assistant to the renowned Sir Archibald MacIndoe in this discipline. Professor Thomas was educated at Methodist Boys' High School in Lagos and Birmingham University in England. He was a Nigerian academic and the pioneer provost of the College of Medicine at the University of Lagos, as well as the first Nigerian to be admitted to the Royal College of Surgeons of England. He also served as the first head of the university's Teaching Hospital, LUTH. Before moving to Lagos, he was a senior lecturer and surgeon at the University of Ibadan, from its inception until 1962. In addition, he was an editor of the West African Medical Journal and a member of the Federal Electoral Commission in 1958. In 1969, he chaired the advisory committee for the establishment of the Midwestern Medical Centre now known as the University of Benin Teaching Hospital.
