= Ahmadu Bello University Teaching Hospital =

Nigerian teaching hospital

Geography
- Location: A126, Ungwan Doka 810105, Zaria, Kaduna State, Nigeria
- Coordinates: 11°10′27.692″N 7°36′17.903″E

Organisation
- Type: Public, Multi-Specialty Teaching Hospital
- Affiliated university: Ahmadu Bello University

Services
- Emergency department: Yes
- Beds: 400

History
- Founded: 2019

Links
- Website: www.abuth.gov.ng
- Lists: Hospitals in Nigeria

Ahmadu Bello University Teaching Hospital is a public hospital located in Zaria, Nigeria. It serves as a training institute for clinical students studying at Ahmadu Bello University. The hospital attends to both in-patients and out-patients. Cases treated at the hospital include malnutrition, cancer, burn victims, and COVID-19.

== History ==
In 2023, the Department of Gynaecology and Obstetrics at the teaching hospital commenced the in vitro fertilisation process, with the first baby delivered on 16 May 2023 through this process, weighing 3 kg.

== Services and departments ==
- Surgical services
- Physiotherapy service
- Molecular Microbiology
- Pharmacy service
- Oncology
- Radiology services
- Pathology
- Maxillofacial and dental service
- Ophthalmology
- Gynaecology
- Paediatric
- Psychritic
- Medical microbiology

== Achievement ==
Ahmadu Bello University Teaching Hospital commissioned a COVID-19 centre in 2020 following the outbreak of the coronavirus. The 48-bed unit, donated by the Nigerian National Petroleum Corporation, was formerly used for burn patients. Urology and kidney facilities were set up at the teaching hospital in 2022. In 2024, Hassy Haven Foundation partnered with ABUTH to provide medical care for 25 female patients at the hospital.

=== Adoption of renewable energy ===
Ahmadu Bello University Teaching Hospital has opted for the use of renewable energy due to the high electricity costs and the unsustainability of the power supply in the medical facility.

=== Rehabilitation ===
The federal ministry of health and social development to rehabilitate and equipped the National eyes center kaduna institute of ophthalmology in the hospital.

== Administration ==
Ahmed Umdagas Hamidu was appointed Chief Medical Director of Ahmadu Bello University Teaching Hospital by the Federal Government of Nigeria, through the Ministry of Health, in 2019 for a four-year tenure. He was reappointed by Muhammadu Buhari in 2023 for an additional four-year term as Chief Medical Director of the teaching hospital.
