= University of Abuja Teaching Hospital =

Teaching hospital in Abuja, Nigeria

Geography
- Location: Gwagwalada 902101, Federal Capital Territory, Abuja, Nigeria

Organisation
- Type: Public, Multi-Specialty Teaching Hospital
- Affiliated university: University of Abuja

Services
- Emergency department: Yes
- Beds: 520

Helipads
- Helipad: No

Links
- Website: uathospital.ng
- Lists: Hospitals in Nigeria

The University of Abuja Teaching Hospital (UATH) is a Federal Government-owned teaching hospital located in Gwagwalada, Abuja, Nigeria. It serves as a training institute for clinical students studying at the University of Abuja. The Teaching Hospital provides treatment for a wide range of diseases, including COVID-19 and other viral infections.

== History ==
The University of Abuja Teaching Hospital (UATH) was established in 1992 as a specialist hospital under the Federal Capital Development Authority with a 360-bed capacity and is equipped with modern medical facilities to treat a wide range of illnesses. The hospital primarily serves residents of the Federal Capital Territory(FCT), Kogi, Niger, Nasarawa and Kaduna States. In 1993, the hospital was transferred to the Federal Ministry of Health and was upgraded to Federal Medical Centre/Specialist Hospital. In September 2006, it was designated as a teaching hospital for the University of Abuja.

During the COVID-19 pandemic, the teaching hospital honoured 80 staff members for their dedication as frontline workers during the outbreak.

In 2020, the Nigerian National Petroleum Corporation donated an oxygen-generating plant, a new ambulance, and a ventilator to the Hospital to help curb the coronavirus outbreak.

Also in 2020, the first Infectious Disease Centre in the Federal Capital Territory(FCT), Abuja, was launched, with the teaching hospital placed in charge of its operations.

In 2021, to further support efforts against the COVID-19 outbreak at the University of Abuja Teaching Hospital, the Nigerian Air Force donated liquid oxygen to the hospital.

In 2022, the Nigeria Liquefied Natural Gas Limited inaugurated a maternity centre at the University of Abuja Teaching Hospital as part of its Hospital Support Programme (HSP).

The hospital's 12-item Patient Bill of Rights was displayed in various locations around the teaching hospital in 2023 to promote patient care and rights.

In April 2024, the Tertiary Education Trust Fund (TETFUND) installed kidney transplant equipment in six teaching hospitals across Nigeria, including the Abuja University Teaching Hospital.

In July 2024, a mental health building, a medical outpatient clinic block, and a cardiovascular research centre were commissioned at the teaching hospital under the administration of Bola Ahmed Tinubu.

== Administration ==
Bisala Ekele was appointed as the Chief Medical Director of the University of Abuja Teaching Hospital in 2017 for a four-year tenure by Yemi Osinbajo while he was acting president. He was reappointed to the position in 2021 under the administration of Muhammadu Buhari.

== Departments ==
The various department in the hospital are: Administration, Nursing Services, Nutrition & Dietetics, Obstetrics & Gynaecology, Ophthalmology, Orthopaedics & Trauma, Paediatrics, Pharmacy, Physiotherapy, Public Relations Unit, Radiology Anaesthesia & Intensive Care, Central Sterility Supply, Ear, Nose & Throat (ENT), Family Medicine, Finance & Accounts, Haematology & Blood Transfusion, Community Medicine, Dental & Maxillofacial Surgery, Internal Medicine, Medical Library, Medical Social Services, Health Information Management, Histopathology, Internal Audit Unit, Mental Health, Microbiology & Parasitology, National Health Insurance Scheme, Surgery, Servicom, Works & Engineering

== CMD ==
Professor Bissallah Ahmed Ekele is the current Chief medical director of university of Abuja Teaching Hospital. He is a native of Ofante, Olamaboro Local Government Area of Kogi State but he was born in Mubi, Adamawa State.
