= Abia State University Teaching Hospital =

Nigerian Teaching hospital

Abia State University Teaching hospital

Geography
- Location: 34 Mcc Rd, Abayi, Aba 453115, Abia, Nigeria
- Coordinates: 5°6′39.72848″N 7°21′54.04788″E

Organisation
- Type: Teaching
- Affiliated university: Abia State University

Services
- Emergency department: Yes
- Beds: 692
- Speciality: Multi-Specialty Hospital

Helipads
- Helipad: Yes

Links
- Website: www.absuthng.org
- Lists: Hospitals in Nigeria

Abia State University Teaching Hospital is a hospital located in Abia State. It serves as a training institute for clinical student studying at Abia State University. Cases such as Mpox virus, have been identified at this hospital.

== History ==
After five years of continuous strike at the teaching hospital, gave the approval for the Medical and Dental Council of Nigeria (MDCN) recruitment of intern doctors for their mandatory one-year internship program. In 2023, the teaching hospital was renovated in response to failure to meet the accreditation exercise conducted by the MDCN the previous year. In December 2023, Abia teaching hospital regained accreditation from the MDCN after three years of suspension from the body due to lack of equipment and welfare.

In June 2024, staff at Abia State University Teaching Hospital (ABSUTH) staged a protest over unpaid salaries, citing up to 21 months in arrears. The action led to a temporary closure of the hospital, with union representatives urging government intervention to resolve the issue.

== Administration ==
In 2015, Nwachukwu Israel Kanu was appointed as Chief Medical Director of the hospital by Governor Theodore Orji. Ndubuisi Davidson Wokoh was approved as the chairman of the governing council of the teaching hospital in 2020.

Prof. Ijeoma Nduka, FMCPH+Chief Medical Director (CMD)

Associate Prof. John Chikezie Austin-Chairman Medical Advisory Committee (C-MAC)

Mr Emma O. Asomugha-Director Of Administration

Mrs. Ngozi Fred-Onwuaju-Director Of Finance.

== Departments/services ==
- Obstetrics and gynecology
- internal medicine
- Cardiac Diagnostics services
- Medical laboratory services
- Pharmacy services
- community medicine
- Accident and emergency services
- Medical Library services
- Mortuary and histopathology service
- Radio diagnostics service
- Paedratics service.
