= Irrua Specialist Teaching Hospital =

University Teaching Hospital in Nigeria

Geography
- Location: Irrua, Edo State, Nigeria

Links
- Website: isth.com.ng
- Lists: Hospitals in Nigeria

Irrua Specialist Teaching Hospital is a federal government of Nigeria teaching hospital located in Irrua, Edo State, Nigeria.The current Chief Medical Director is Professor Reuben Eifediyi. The purpose of Irrua specialist Teaching Hospital (ISTH) is to become a Centre of Excellence in Teaching, research and Services to various health problems facing the rural and suburban/small urban town communities. Their aim is to manage and control viral hemorrhagic fevers, with special reference to Lassa Fever.

Irrua specialist teaching hospital is also established to provide specialized, affordable, accessible and qualitative promotive, preventive and curative health care services for patients.

== History ==
Irrua Specialist Teaching Hospital was established by decree 92 of 1993 (Appendix I). The hospital was formerly known as Otibhor Okae Teaching Hospital.

== CMD ==
The current Chief Medical Director is Professor Reuben.A Eifediyi.

== Departments ==
Trauma & intensive care, Aged Care, Community Services, Diagnosis & Investigation, Medical & Surgical, Mental Health, Rehabitation, Specialised Support Service

== Schools ==
- School of Peri- operative Nursing
- College of Nursing
- School of Paediatric Nursing
