= Federal Teaching Hospital, Ido Ekiti =

Federal teaching hospital, Iddo Ekiti

Geography
- Location: Iddo Ekiti, Ekiti State, Nigeria

Organisation
- Type: General, Multi-Specialty Teaching Hospital
- Affiliated university: FUOYE

Services
- Emergency department: Yes
- Beds: 600

Helipads
- Helipad: Yes

History
- Founded: 1998

Links
- Website: fethi.gov.ng
- Lists: Hospitals in Nigeria

Federal Teaching Hospital, Iddo Ekiti is a public hospital located in Ekiti State and is used by the Federal University of Oye Ekiti to train its medical students. The hospital serves as an isolation centre during disease outbreaks such as Lassa fever. The hospital premises also serve as a learning environment for students in the state's school of nursing.

== History ==
There were 703 staff members in the school, according to statistics released in 2021 by the CMD, with 629 staff members promoted and 71 new staff members hired. In 2022, the Ogunruku family donated a six-bedroom flat to the teaching hospital to immortalize one of their family members, Ifelola Ana-Ogunruku, whodied as a bachelor.

A new annex of the hospital was approved for construction by Muhammad Ali Pate in 2023.

== Administration ==
The Chief Medical Director of FEHI is Adekunle Ajayi, who was first appointed in December 2017 and had his appointment renewed in 2021 by the Muhammadu Buhari administration.

Foluso Moronke Adelegan was appointed by the Federal Ministry of Health and Social Welfare as the Director of Administration and Secretary to the Board of Management of the hospital, Ido Ekiti, in 2024.

== Department ==
=== Clinical Services ===
Histopathology

Accident & Emergency

Surgery

Health Information Management

Family Medicine

Dentistry

DEPARTMENT OF CHEMICAL PATHOLOGY

PHYSIOTHERAPY DEPARTMENT

DEPARTMENT OF PHARMACY
