= Ahmadiyya Hospital Newbussa =

Hospital in New Bussa, Nigeria

- Ahmadiyya

Geography
- Location: New Bussa, Niger State, Nigeria
- Coordinates: 9.873974°N 4.501151°E

Organisation
- Type: General
- Religious affiliation: Ahmadiyya Muslim Community

Services
- Emergency department: Primary and secondary care Adult & Pediatric
- Beds: 25

History
- Opened: December 1997

Ahmadiyya Hospital New bussa provides humanitarian services to the people of New Bussa, Mokwa and its surrounding areas.

== History ==
Ahmadiyya Muslim Hospital, Newbussa, Niger state was opened on 1 December 1997. Dr Malik Mudassar Ahmed (MBBS) was appointed as the First Medical Director of the hospital while Dr Laiqa Fozia (MBBS) his wife started working as Gyne and Obs specialist. Initially Hospital opened with 12 bed inpatient facility a radiology department an operation theater and outpatient facility.

In November 2001 Dr Muhammad Saqib Ghumman (MBBS) was appointed as the second medical director of the Healthcare facility. In September 2005 Dr Mehboob Ahmed Rehan (MBBS) was appointed as the third medical director.

As of 2013 the facility contained 25 beds, ER, outpatient clinic, Diabetes and Hypertension clinics, a medical and a Surgical unit and a Radiology Department. On an average 35 health care professionals work in the facility.

The hospital was started under the Majlis Nusrat Jahan Scheme which was started by the worldwide head of the Ahmadiyya Muslim Community, Mirza Nasir Ahmed in 1970 on his tour of west African countries. The headquarters of the scheme is in Rabwah, Pakistan which is run by Secretary Majlis Nusrat Jahan from Rabwah.

This main objectives of the Nusrat Jehan Scheme was to render educational, humanitarian and social services to the local community in African countries. Under the guidelines of this project doctors and teachers were sent to serve in Nigeria, Ghana, Liberia, Gambia, and Sierra Leone. At the start of the project 17 hospitals and 15 secondary schools were set up by the Ahmadiyya community.

As of 2004 the scheme had 373 schools and 36 hospitals in 12 countries under its name.

Khaifatul Masih V, Mirza Masroor Ahmad visited the complex in 2008 during the Centenary Khilafat Celebration in Nigeria.

== Department ==
General Medical

Medical Consultants

Laboratory Services

Ultrasound Scan Services

Radiology (X-ray)

Outpatient Services

Inpatient Care Services

Maternity and Antenatal

Pharmacy Services

ART Clinic

Immunization and Vaccination

Family Planning

Surgery and Caesarean Section

Dental Services

Community Outreach Services.
