= Olabisi Onabanjo University Teaching Hospital =

Coordinates: 6.84904°N 3.65302°E

Olabisi Onabanjo University Teaching Hospital, Sagamu
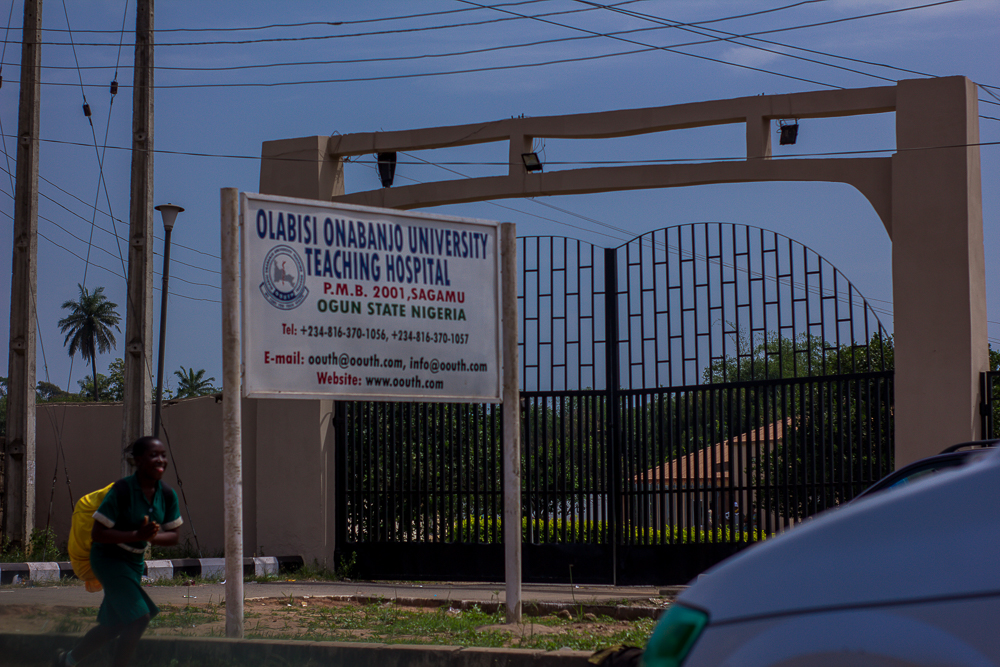
- University College Hospital

Geography
- Location: Sagamu, Ogun State, Nigeria

Organisation
- Care system: Public
- Type: Teaching
- Affiliated university: Olabisi Onabanjo University Ago-Iwoye, Ogun State

Services
- Emergency department: Yes

History
- Former name: Ogun State University Teaching Hospital
- Founded: January 1, 1986

Links
- Website: oouth.com/oouth/portal/home.php
- Lists: Hospitals in Nigeria

Olabisi Onabanjo University Teaching Hospital (OOUTH), formerly called Ogun State University Teaching Hospital (OSUTH), is situated at Sagamu, Ogun State, South West Nigeria. The teaching hospital was established in 1986 with the primary aim of teaching medical students from Olabisi Onabanjo University and providing healthcare services to the indigenes of Ogun State and Nigeria as a whole.

== Overview ==
OOUTH was founded on January 1, 1986, in partnership with Obafemi Awolowo College Health Sciences to provide medical training for medical students of Olabisi Onabanjo University. The teaching hospital was located at the former State Hospital, Sagamu, Ogun State, Nigeria. The Chief Medical Director (CMD) of the hospital was Prof. A.A.O. Laditan. The hospital is managed by governing council appointed by the state government. As of 2016, the chairman of the governing council is Professor Emmanuel O. Otolorin.

== CMD ==
The current chief medical director (CMD) of the OOU teaching hospital is Oluwabunmi Motunrayo Fatungase.

== Department ==
- Clinical
- Peadiatrics
- Pharmacy
- Ophthalmology
- Orthopeadic & Trauma
- Obstetrics & Gynaecology
- Nursing Services
- Medicine
- Laboratory Services
- Food Services
- Anaesthesia & Intensive Care
- ENT / ORL
- Physiotherapy
- Radiology
- Surgery

== Donation ==
The United Nation Children's Fund (UNICEF) in partnership with IHS, donated an oxygen plant to the teaching hospital in November 2023. The plant which produces 300 liters of oxygen per minute. In 2021, the newly built dialysis center in the teaching hospital, which was donated by The Redeemed Christian Church of God, was commissioned by the state governor, Dapo Abiodun.
