= Federal Medical Centre, Abeokuta =

Hospital in Abeokuta, Nigeria

Federal Medical Centre (FMC)
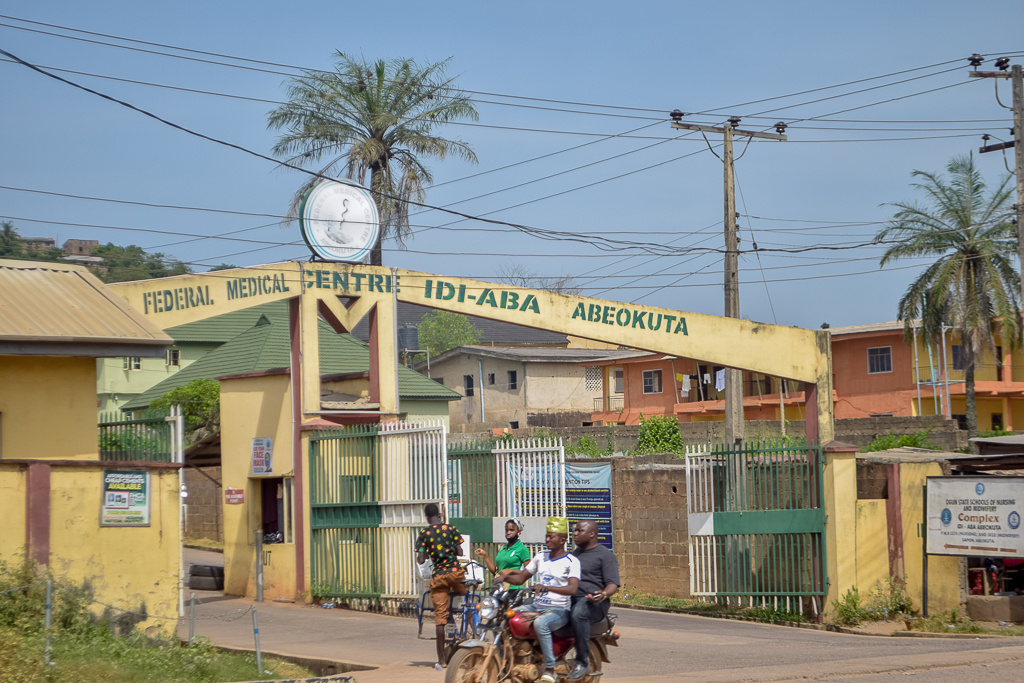

Geography
- Location: Abeokuta, Nigeria
- Coordinates: 7.144071°N 3.380450°E

Organisation
- Care system: Public
- Type: General, Teaching, Research

Services
- Emergency department: Yes

History
- Founded: 21 April 1983

Links
- Lists: Hospitals in Nigeria

The Federal Medical Centre (FMC) Abeokuta came into existence on 21 April 1983, when the state hospital, Idi-Aba, was handed over to the federal government by the then state Governor, Chief Olusegun Osoba for development into a federal tertiary health institution for the people of Ogun State and Nigerians in general.

The pioneer medical director, Professor E. O. Otolorin meticulously steered the ship of the hospital between 1993 and 1999. He was succeeded by Dr. T. O. Motayo who administered the hospital between 2000 and 2008. He was succeeded by Dr. O. S. Sotiloye who steered the affairs of hospital till 2017. He has since been succeeded by Prof A.A.Musa, who has already spent 4 years in office.

== Mission ==
The mission of the hospital as it appears on the official website is "To provide quality and timely clinical and other supportive services to patients within the jurisdiction, and qualitative research and training activities, and be the choice of seeking qualitative health care services in Ogun State and environs".

== Clinical Service ==
- Nursing Service
- Health Records
- Family Medicine
- Pharmacy
- Paediatrics
- Internal Medicine
- Obstetrics & Gynecology
- Surgery
- Anaesthesia/ICU
- Catering
- Nutrition and Dietetics
- Anatomy Pathology
- Haematology
- Chemical Pathology
- Medical Microbiology
- Physiotherapy
- Restorative Dentistry
- Preventive Dentistry
- Child Oral Health
- Oral & Maxillofacial
- Mental Health & Behavioral Medicine
- Radiology
- Ophthalmology
- Social Welfare
- Medical Library
- Orthopedic & Trauma
- CMPC
- Pain and Palliative
- ENT
- Oncology
- Environmental Health & Safety

=== Non Clinical Service ===
- Administration
- Information Communication Technology (ICT)
- Finance and Account
- Internal Audit
- Public Relations and Information (PRO)
- Works and Maintenance
- Procurement
- Security.

== CMD ==
The CMD of federal medical center abeokuta Mr. Abdullahi Dayo Israel, he was appointed by president Bola Armed in January 2025.

== Collaboration ==
Federal medical center abeokuta, collaborate with ogun state house of assembly to fight cancer in the state .

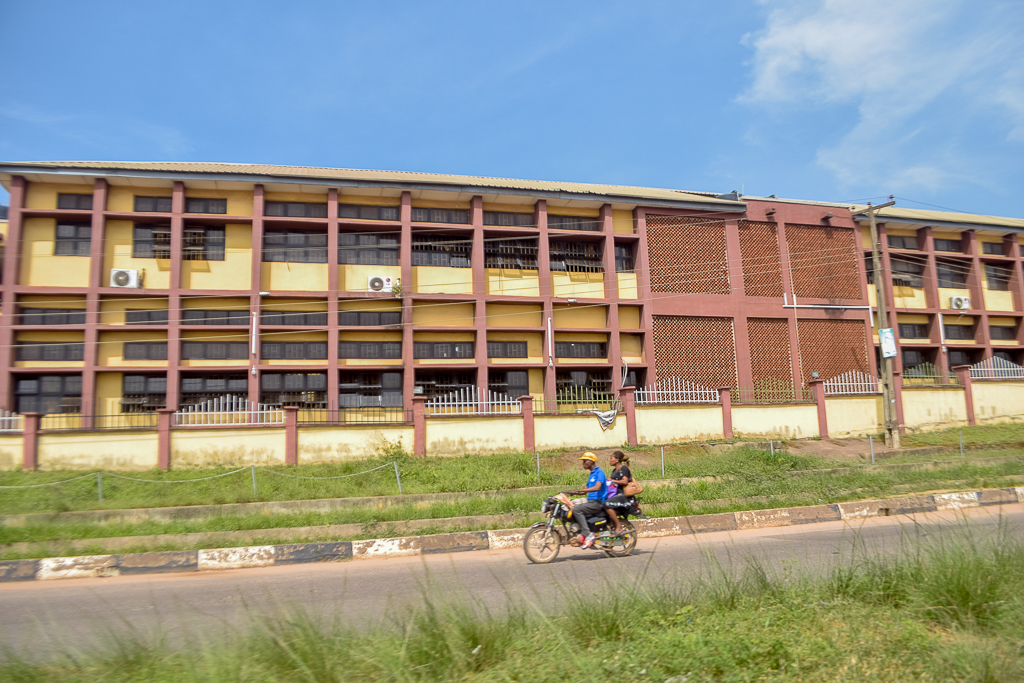

== Related pages ==
- Federal Medical Center, Azare
