= Afe Babalola University Teaching Hospital =

Geography
- Location: 99 Ureje, Ado Ekiti, Ekiti State, Nigeria
- Coordinates: 7°36′30.3732″N 5°15′18.8665″E

Organisation
- Type: Private, Multi-Specialty Teaching Hospital
- Affiliated university: Afe Babalola University

Services
- Emergency department: Yes
- Beds: 400

Helipads
- Helipad: Yes

History
- Founded: 2017

Links
- Website: amsh.abuad.edu.ng
- Lists: Hospitals in Nigeria

Afe Babalola University Teaching Hospital is a private hospital in Ekiti State, Nigeria. It serves as a training institute for clinical students studying at Afe Babalola University.

== History ==
It was commissioned in 2017 as a 400-bed building by Yemi Osinbajo, the former vice president of Nigeria, to serve as Afe Babalola University Teaching Hospital. The hospital is accredited by the Medical and Dental Council of Nigeria (MDCN) and the National Universities Commission (NUC). In 2019, the hospital recorded its first heart surgery, which was carried out by Tayo Adeleke and Paul Davies, a US-based cardiologist. The teaching hospital carried out its first kidney transplant, a procedure which lasted five hours was performed on a 46-year old man with hypertension and kidney failure in 2021.

== Collaboration ==
In 2018, ABUAD Teaching Hospital signed a memorandum of understanding with Aster Group of Hospitals, Dubai, which boosted medical administration and enhanced technology. In 2023, the founder of the university, Afe Babalola, sought a partnership with Ekiti State University to enhance health technology in Nigeria.

== Department ==
1. Intensive Care Unit
2. Dental Clinic
3. Pediatric Clinic
4. Laboratory Services
5. Cardiac Services
6. Rehabilitation
