= Obafemi Awolowo University Teaching Hospital =

Obafemi Awolowo University Teaching Hospital (OAUTHC)

Geography
- Location: Nigeria
- Coordinates: 7.4949°N 4.5779°E

Organisation
- Care system: Public
- Type: Teaching
- Affiliated university: Obafemi Awolowo University College of Medicine.

Services
- Emergency department: Yes

History
- Founded: 1967

Links
- Website: oauthc.com
- Lists: Hospitals in Nigeria

The Obafemi Awolowo University Teaching Hospital Complex(OAUTHC) is a tertiary healthcare facility established in 1967.it is affiliated with Obafemi Awolowo University, Ile Ife.

== CMD ==
The Nigeria President, Bola AhmedTinubu appointed Prof John Okeniyi, as Chief Medical Director of the hospital.

== Departments ==
The following departments are available at the university hospital; Cardiology Center, General Surgery Center, Neurology Center, Orthopedic Center, Emergency Department, Paediatrics Department, Haematology & Blood Transfusion Department, Community Health Department, Physiotherapy Department, General Surgery Department.

== Services ==
Research and Ethics

Diseases & Symptoms

Test and imaging
