= Ido Ekiti =

LGA in Ekiti state, Nigeria

Ido Ekiti is a town in the Ido-Osi Local Government Area of Ekiti State, Nigeria. It is situated in the northern part of the state where the routes from Oyo, Osun and Kwara states respectively converge. Ido-Ekiti is the headquarters of the Ido-Osi local council. It is bounded in the east by Ipere and Iludun, in the south by Igbole and Ifinsin and in the north and northwest by Usi Ekiti and Ilogbo Ekiti. It is the head of Ido Kingdom known as Ido mẹ́wa. It comprises Ido, Ifaki, Orin, Ifinsin, Igbole, Ilogbo, Usi, Oke-Ọra, Odo-Ora, and Ilogun.

== Healthcare ==
The major hospital in Ido Ekiti is the Federal Teaching Hospital. It is a Federal Government-owned primary, secondary and tertiary health service provider and clinical training institution in Nigeria. The hospital is one of the fastest-growing teaching hospitals in the country. It was established in 1998 to provide affordable, high-quality, and accessible care to every state in Nigeria, particularly to the people in the Ekiti State and its surroundings.
