= University of Ilorin Teaching Hospital =

- UITH Hospital Library

Geography
- Location: Oke-Ose, Ilorin, Kwara State, Nigeria
- Coordinates: 8°32′15″N 4°38′48″E

Organisation
- Type: District General, Teaching
- Affiliated university: University of Ilorin

Services
- Emergency department: Yes
- Beds: 600

Helipads
- Helipad: Yes

History
- Founded: 1970

Links
- Website: www.uithilorin.org.ng
- Lists: Hospitals in Nigeria

University of Ilorin Teaching Hospital (UITH) is the first tertiary hospital in Kwara state, Nigeria. The hospital has managed various medical conditions, including eclampsia and COVID-19. It is also one of the healthcare facilities in developing countries that provides palliative care including bereavement support, symptom management and pain control. The most common type of malignancy treated at UITH is breast cancer.

== History ==
Between 1972 and 1982, 138,577 births and 624 maternal deaths were recorded at the University of Ilorin Teaching Hospital(UITH), resulting in a maternal mortality rate of 4.50 per 1,000 births.

According to a research conducted at the University of Ilorin Teaching Hospital in 2014, Platyrrhine nose type is the most common in Ilorin, with a higher prevalence among males than females.

In 2020, following the outbreak of coronavirus, UITH isolated 25 health workers who were claimed to be in contact with the infected accountant, Obanimomo who eventually died according to the report disclosed by the Chief Medical Director, Prof. Abdullahi Yussuf during the outbreak.

=== Approval of outreach center ===
In 2022, the federal ministry of health approved the newly commission comprehensive health center in Idi-Isin Ilorin as the outreach center for university of Ilorin teaching hospital.

The Ilorin Descendants Progressive Union (IEDPU) in a statement released by Alhaji Aliyu Ota, at the 58th national conference of the union in December, 2023 called the attention of the Kwara State Governor, to the decaying infrastructure of UITH.

Fire outbreak reportedly damaged some part of the hospital building including computer appliance and the pharmacy in April, 2024.

== Commission of ICU ==
The Burn intensive Care Unit named after Batuli Ajiferuke Shagaya, donated by a member of the Shagaya family was commissioned by the Kwara state government in July, 2024.

== Departments ==
=== Clinical ===
Anesthesia

Invitro fertilization

Epidernology

Ophthalmology

Physiotherapy

Pharmacy

Surgery

Nursing service

Accident and Emergency

Dietetic

Urology

Medicine

Radiology

Paediatrics

NHIS

Community Health

Heamatology

=== Non clinicals ===
Account

Board and Tender

Corporate Affairs

ICT

Servicom

Procurement Unit

Legal

Audit

Central Administration

Ethics and Research

== Schools ==
Post Basic Nursing ( Nephrology, Accident& Emergency, Nephrology, Paediatric, Opyhalmology)

Community Health

Basic Nursing

Orthopedic Cast Technology

Health Information Management
