= Rasheed Shekoni Federal University Teaching Hospital =

Geography
- Location: Dutse, Jigawa State, Jigawa State, Nigeria
- Coordinates: 11.6785°N 9.3367°E

Organisation
- Type: Teaching
- Affiliated university: Federal University Dutse

Services
- Emergency department: Yes
- Beds: 600
- Specialty: Research teaching hospital

Helipads
- Helipad: Yes

History
- Founded: 17th March 2011

Links
- Website: www.rsfuth.org
- Lists: Hospitals in Nigeria

Rasheed Shekoni Federal University Teaching Hospital (RSFUTH) is a tertiary healthcare institution located in Dutse, Jigawa State, Nigeria. It serves as the primary teaching hospital for the Federal University Dutse College of Medicine and Allied Medical Sciences, providing clinical training for medical students, resident doctors, and other healthcare professionals. The current Chief Medical Director is Dr. Salisu Mu'azu Babura.

Originally established as Rasheed Shekoni Specialist Hospital, the facility was upgraded and formally taken over by the Federal Government of Nigeria on October 21, 2022, transforming it into a full-fledged teaching hospital.

RSFUTH offers a wide range of specialized medical services, including cardiology, nephrology, obstetrics and gynecology, surgery, pediatrics, and intensive care. The hospital is equipped with modern diagnostic and treatment facilities, including a multidisciplinary ultrasound unit, an advanced ophthalmology department, a CT scan, a dialysis unit, and a fully functional intensive care unit (ICU).

As one of the leading referral centers in northern Nigeria, RSFUTH plays a crucial role in healthcare delivery, medical research, and professional training. The hospital continues to expand its services and infrastructure to meet the growing healthcare needs of Jigawa State and beyond.

== History ==
Rasheed Shekoni Federal University Teaching Hospital, Dutse, was originally established as Rasheed Shekoni Specialist Hospital to provide advanced medical care in Jigawa State, Nigeria. The hospital was named in honor of Rasheed Shekoni, a distinguished figure known for his contributions to healthcare and community development.

The hospital's construction was completed during the military administration of Rasheed Shekoni, but it remained non-functional for years due to inadequate equipment and government neglect. Over time, the abandoned facility suffered vandalism, with many removable items stolen. In December 2007, Governor Sule Lamido announced plans to rehabilitate and upgrade the hospital to meet international standards.

The renovation and expansion of the hospital were carried out in two phases. The first phase, costing approximately ₦2.5 billion, focused on infrastructural rehabilitation, modernization of medical facilities, and procurement of advanced equipment. This included a multidisciplinary ultrasound unit, an upgraded ophthalmology department, and a defibrillator for cardiac emergencies. The second phase aimed at further expanding the hospital by establishing staff housing, enhancing the radiology department with a CT scan and fluoroscopy unit, and introducing specialized units such as dialysis, intensive care, orthopedics, and neurosurgery. These upgrades positioned the hospital among Nigeria’s leading medical institutions, comparable to the Stella Obasanjo Women and Children Hospital in Benin City. The hospital also attracted specialists from within and outside Nigeria, including Egypt.

On October 21, 2022, the Federal Government of Nigeria formally took over Rasheed Shekoni Specialist Hospital from the Jigawa State Government. The transition, formalized through a Memorandum of Understanding (MOU) signed between the Minister of Health, Dr. Osagie Ehanire, and the Governor of Jigawa State, Alhaji Mohammad Badaru Abubakar, marked the hospital’s upgrade to a Federal University Teaching Hospital. This transition aimed to integrate the hospital as the primary training and research facility for the Federal University Dutse College of Medicine and Allied Medical Sciences.

Today, Rasheed Shekoni Federal University Teaching Hospital serves as a key institution for medical education, offering training to medical students, resident doctors, and other healthcare professionals while providing high-quality medical services to the people of Jigawa State and beyond.

== Administration ==
Rasheed Shekoni Federal University Teaching Hospital (RSFUTH) is managed by a structured administrative framework that ensures the smooth operation of the hospital's medical, academic, and research activities. The hospital operates under the oversight of the Federal Ministry of Health and is affiliated with the Federal University Dutse College of Medicine and Allied Medical Sciences for medical training and research.

RSFUTH is overseen by a Governing Board appointed by the Federal Government of Nigeria. This board is responsible for policy formulation, resource allocation, and ensuring compliance with national healthcare regulations.

The Chief Medical Director (CMD) is the highest-ranking executive in the hospital, responsible for overall leadership, strategic planning, and hospital operations. The CMD is appointed by the Federal Government and works closely with other directors to manage the hospital effectively. Dr. Salisu Mu'azu Babura serves as the Chief Medical Director of RSFUTH.

As a teaching hospital, RSFUTH collaborates with Federal University Dutse (FUD) to provide clinical training for medical students, resident doctors, and other healthcare professionals.

RSFUTH receives funding from the Federal Government of Nigeria, primarily through budgetary allocations by the Federal Ministry of Health. Additional funding sources include grants, research partnerships, and internally generated revenue from medical services.
