= Jos University Teaching Hospital =

Government hospital in Nigeria

Coordinates: 9.90652°N 8.95471°E

Geography
- Location: Jos, Nigeria

Organisation
- Care system: Public
- Affiliated university: University of Jos

Services
- Emergency department: Yes

History
- Founded: 1975

Links
- Website: https://juth.gov.ng/
- Lists: Hospitals in Nigeria

Jos University Teaching Hospital (JUTH) is a Federal Tertiary Health Institution of Nigeria, established in 1975 formally recognized by an Act of parliament in 1981 located in Jos North Plateau State. The Chief Medical Director is Doctor Bupwatda Pokop Wushipba. The Chief Medical Director, recognized staff with meritorious and long-standing awards on December 15 to incentivize JUTH working environment.

== History ==
Jos University Teaching Hospital was established in 1975. It was established during the regime of Gen. Yakubu Gowon but was commissioned in 1977 during the regime of Gen. Olusegun Obasanjo. In 2001, Bill & Melinda Gates Foundation partnered with JUTH to establish a laboratory to combat HIV. In 2007, Obasanjo commissioned a permanent site for the hospital.

== Description ==
=== Locations ===
There are four locations of JUTH which are as follows:

- JUTH Permanent Site, Lamingo
- Comprehensive Health Centre, Gindiri
- Zamko Comprehensive Health Centre
- Federal Staff Clinic, Tudun Wada

=== Departments ===
JUTH has 43 departments:

1. Administration.
2. Accounts.
3. Anesthesia.
4. Catering.
5. Chemical Pathology.
6. Community Medicine.
7. Child and Oral Health.
8. Directorate of Clinical Training and Services.
9. Dietetic.
10. Domestic Services.
11. Family Medicine.
12. Hematology and Blood Transfusion.
13. Health Records.
14. Anatomic Pathology and Forensic Medicine.
15. Information and Communication Technology.
16. Information, Protocol, and Public relations.
17. Internal Audit.
18. Internal Security Unit.
19. Legal.
20. Medical Microbiology.
21. Medical Social Work.
22. Medicine.
23. Nursing Services.
24. Oral Diagnostics Services.
25. Oral and Maxillofacial Surgery.
26. Obstetrics and Gynaecology.
27. Ophthalmology.
28. Orthopedics and Trauma.
29. Otorhinolaryngology(ENT).
30. Pediatrics.
31. Pharmacy.
32. Physiotherapy.
33. Planning, Research, and Statistics.
34. Procurement.
35. Psychiatry.
36. Preventive Dentistry.
37. Radiology.
38. Radiotherapy Oncology.
39. Restorative Dentistry.
40. Stores and Supplies.
41. Surgery.
42. Transport.
43. Works.

== Facilities and Units ==
=== Accident and Emergency Unit (A&E) ===
This unit is the engine of the Jos University Teaching Hospital which responds to varying degrees of accidents and emergency patients. The Accident and Emergency Unit has 34 beds. It has a mediboard which displays real-time information of admitted patients, new patients reviewed, and discharged patients.

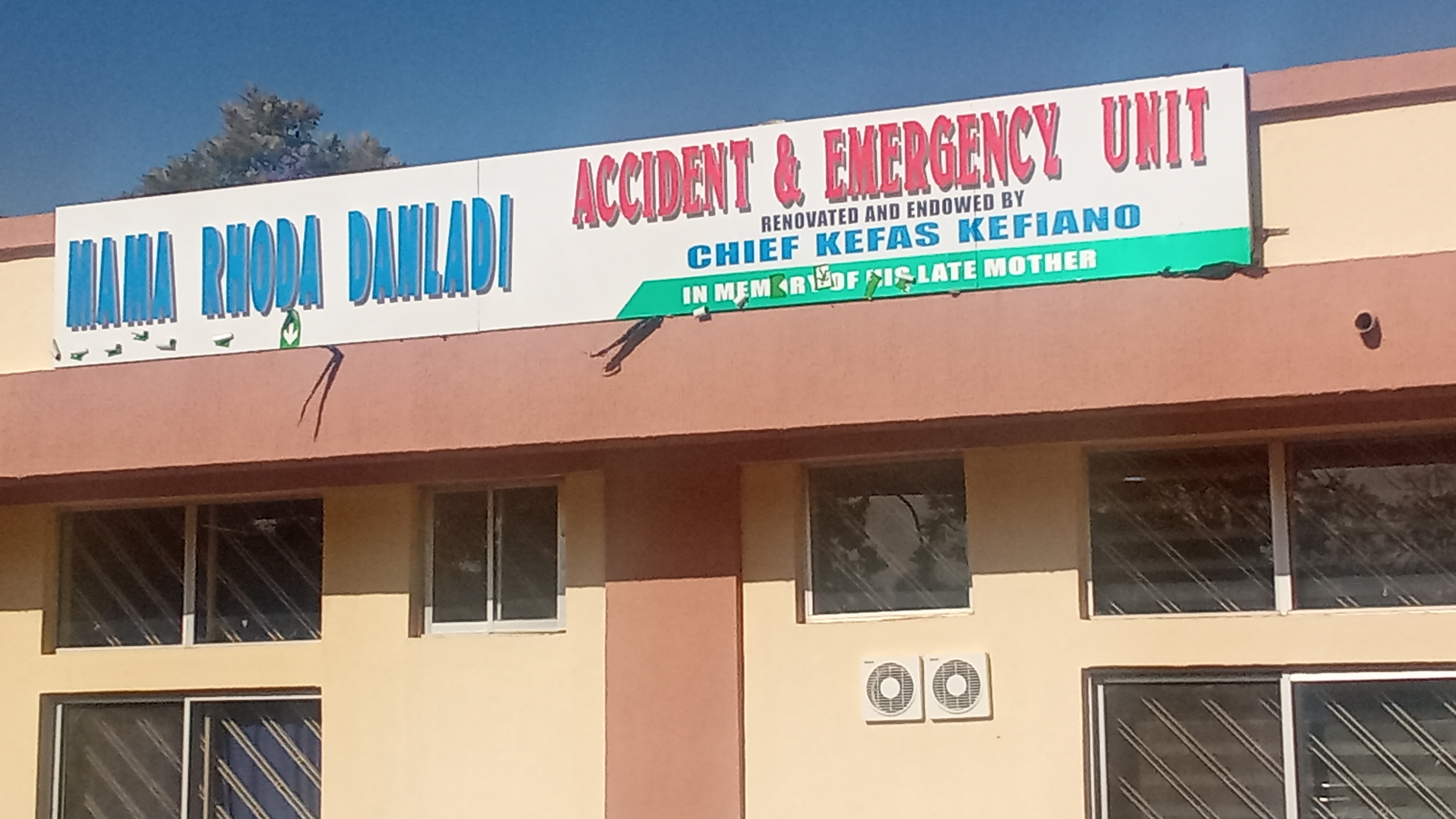
A&E Unit entrance

== Education ==
JUTH's partnership with the College of Health Sciences, University of Jos provides degree programmes to medical students. In this regard, JUTH provides specialized training experience and placement within its departments to medical students of University of Jos College of Health Sciences. Every year, JUTH inducts Doctors, Nurses, Medical Laboratory Scientists, Dentists, and more. There are 5 faculties which are as follows:

- Faculty of Basic Clinical Sciences
- Faculty of Basic Medical Sciences
- Faculty of Clinical Sciences
- Faculties of Dental Sciences
- Faculties of Health Sciences and Technology

== Kefiano Global Foundation ==
Due to under-equipment of public hospitals common with public health care providers in Nigeria, the founder of Kefiano Global Foundation, Chief Kefas Ropshik renovated and upgraded JUTH's Accident and Emergency Unit (A&E Unit), donating new wheelchairs, stretchers, patient's monitor, defilibrator, concentrators. Chief Kefas paid the medical bills of the incipient patients in the commissioned facility, pledged to pay for basic sanitary items in the Accident and Emergency Unit.

== NLNG Twin Theater suite ==
As part of its Hospital Support Programme, Nigeria LNG a leading player in Nigeria's Oil and Gas sector intervened in JUTH by constructing a twin theater suite. This facility makes access to critical surgical treatments a reality for patients.

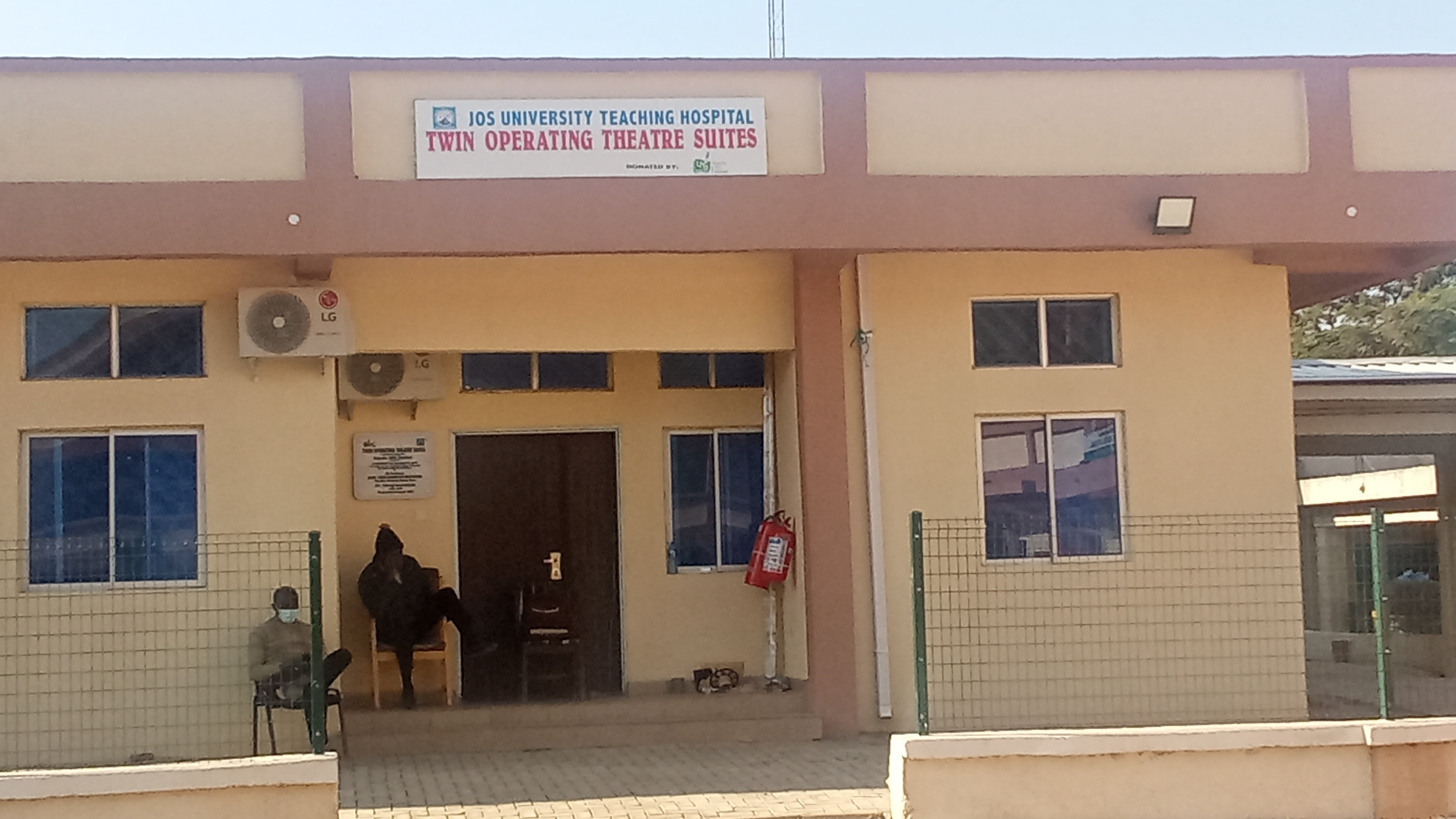
the facility
