= University of Benin Teaching Hospital =

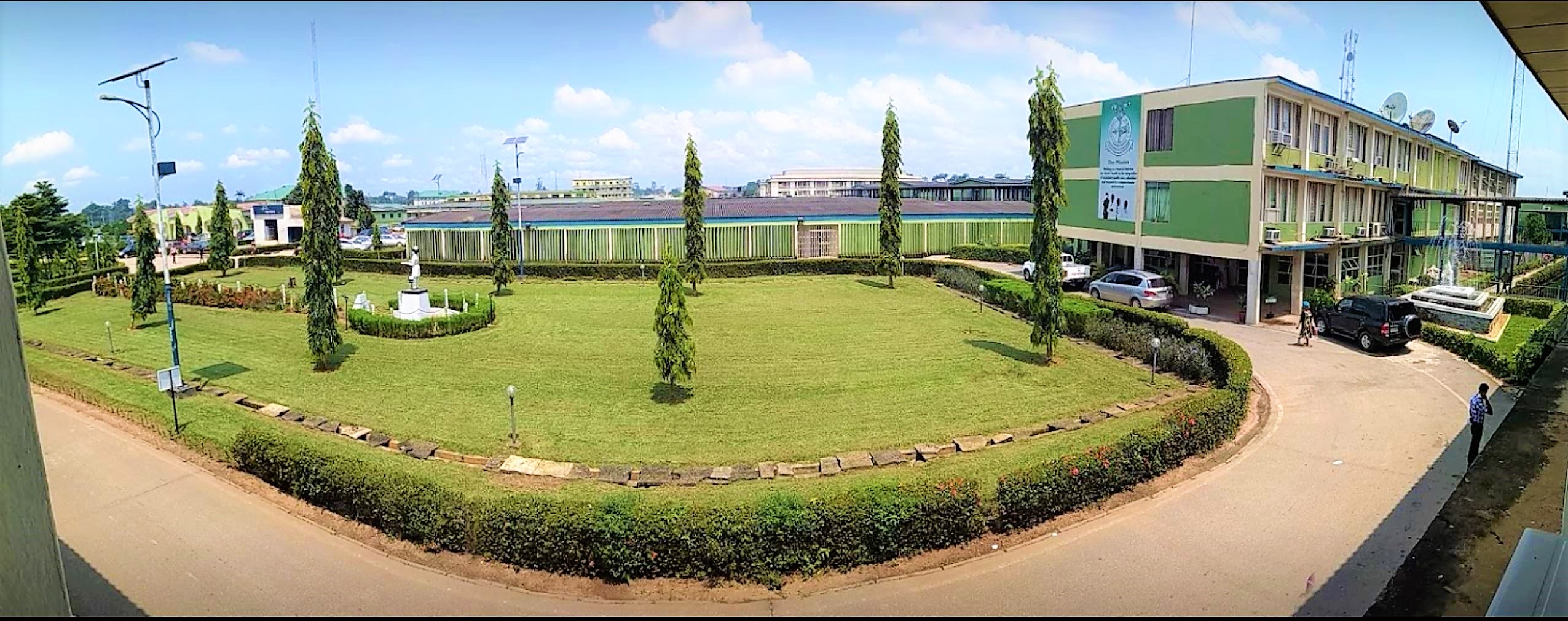
- Aerial view of the entrance to the hospital's administrative building

Geography
- Location: Ugbowo, Benin City, Edo State, Nigeria
- Coordinates: 6°23′26″N 5°36′44″E

Organisation
- Type: District General, Teaching
- Affiliated university: University of Benin, Nigeria

Services
- Emergency department: Yes
- Beds: 910

Helipads
- Helipad: Yes

History
- Founded: 1973

Links
- Website: www.ubth.org
- Lists: Hospitals in Nigeria

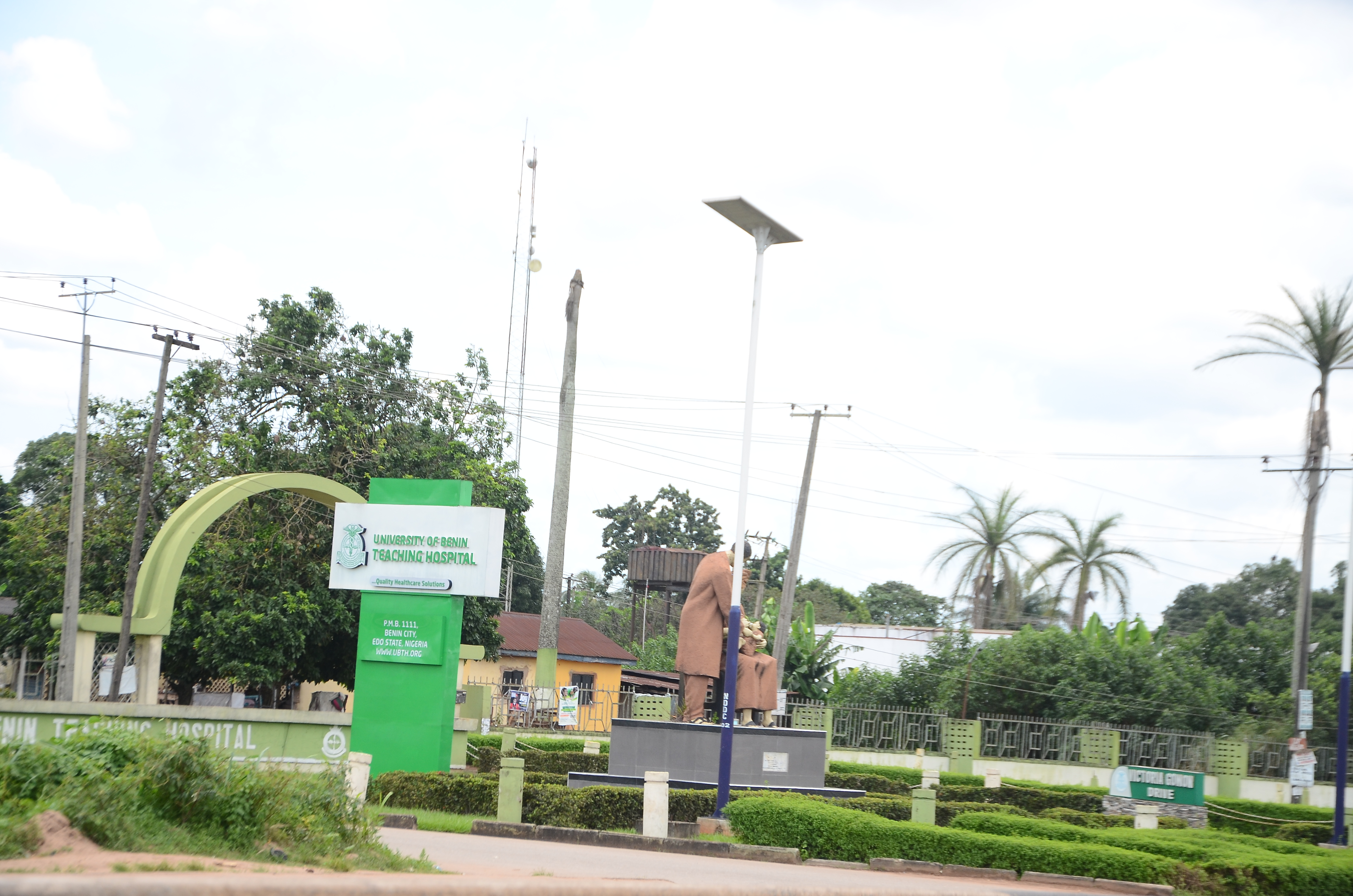
University of Benin Teaching Hospital, Benin

University of Benin Teaching Hospital (UBTH) is a multi-specialty healthcare provider in West Africa, located in Ugbowo, Benin City. The hospital was established on May 12, 1973, following the enactment of Edict No. 12 under the Nigerian National Health Act, but was taken over by the Federal Government on April 1, 1975.

As the sixth of Nigeria's first-generation teaching hospitals, its establishment was intended to complement its sister institution, the University of Benin, and to provide secondary and tertiary health care to the then Mid-Western Region (now Edo and Delta States) and its environs. The hospital also offers facilities for the training of high- and mid-level health care profession for the health industry. UBTH spearheads research opportunities for university lecturers and other researchers studying economic morbidity and related healthcare issues

Through the Community Health Centres in Ogbona and Udo, and the General Practice Clinic which was established later, UBTH also provides primary health care services to the surrounding communities. University of Benin Teaching Hospital offers internship training program for medical professionals across various fields including medicine, pharmacy, physiotherapy, ophthalmology, medical laboratory science, nursing, radiography, dentistry, nutrition and dietetics, and other health care professions.

== History ==
The concept of the University of Benin Teaching Hospital (UBTH) originated in 1969, spearheaded by Colonel Samuel O. Ogbemudia, the then Governor of the Midwestern State of Nigeria, and Prof. Tiamiyu Belo-Osagie. The plan to establish a modern medical centre in the Midwestern Region of Nigeria was conceived after the governor privately visited the Island Maternity Hospital, Lagos, and the Lagos University Teaching Hospital.

A few months later, an Advisory Committee for the Midwestern Medical Centre was established with Prof. H. Oritsejolomi Thomas as chairman. Other members included Prof. Tiamiyu Belo-Osagie, Prof. Alex Eyimofo Boyo, and Mr. O. I. Afe, who served as Secretary to the Midwestern Military Government and Head of Service.

Within the same year, the committee awarded the hospital's construction contract to Costain (Nigeria) Limited and with funding provided jointly by both the Government of the Midwestern Region and the Federal Government of Nigeria. Other prominent individuals who played key roles in the hospital's establishment from construction to its opening included Dr. Irene E. B. Ighodaro, Prof. Glyn O. Philips, Dr. A. E. Ikomi, Dr. F. O. Esiri Infirmary, and Mr. J. O. Iluebbey.

The Midwest Medical Centre was renamed University of Benin Teaching Hospital during a budget speech by Colonel Samuel O. Ogbemudia in April 1972.

The University of Benin Teaching Hospital is currently led by Darlington E. Obaseki.

== Department ==
=== Clinical Departments ===
- Child Health
- Department of Chemical Pathology
- Department of Obstetrics and Gynaecology
- Department of Physiotherapy
- Surgery
- Department of Paediatrics
- Mental Health
- Community Health
- Environmental Health Unit
- Radiology Department
- Department of Orthopaedics and Traumatology
- Haematology
- Restorative Dentistry
- Department of Ophthalmology
- Oral and Maxillofacial Pathology

== Notable people ==
- Osagie Emmanuel Ehanire
- Darlington E. Obaseki, Professor of Histopathology and the sixth Chief Medical Director of the hospital.
