= List of hospitals in Nigeria =

The following is a list of hospitals in Nigeria.

- African Medical Centre of Excellence, Abuja
- Borno State Specialist Hospital, Maiduguri
- Rasheed Shekoni Federal University Teaching Hospital
- General Hospital Potiskum
- Etta Atlantic Memorial Hospital
- Lekfad Medical Centre
- UDUTH SOKOTO
- Regions Stroke and Neuroscience Hospital, Mgbirichi, Imo State
- Aminu Kano Teaching Hospital
- University of Benin Teaching Hospital
- University of Ilorin Teaching Hospital
- University of Nigeria Teaching Hospital
- University College Hospital, Ibadan
- Jos University Teaching Hospital
- Ahmadiyya Hospital Newbussa
- Biu General Hospital
- General Hospital Ningi
- Federal Health Medical Center (FHMC)
- National Hospital, Abuja
- Abia State University Teaching Hospital, Aba
- Imo State University Teaching Hospital, Orlu
- Sir Yahaya Memorial Hospital Kebbi
- ECWA Hospital Egbe
- Federal Medical Center, Abeokuta
- Bingham University teaching hospital. Formerly Ecwa Evangel Hospital, Jos
- Olabisi Onabanjo University Teaching Hospital, Ogun
- Lagos University Teaching Hospital
- Lagos State University Teaching Hospital
- Federal Teaching Hospital, Ido Ekiti
- St Edmund Eye Hospital Surulere Lagos
- Massey Street Children's Hospital, Lagos Island
- Newlife Hospital Mubi, Adamawa State
- General Hospital Kumo (Proposed Specialist Hospital Kumo)
- University of Abuja Teaching Hospital, Abuja
- Ahmadu Bello University Teaching Hospital, Zaria

== Kano State ==
See: List of hospitals in Kano

== Lagos State ==
See: List of hospitals in Lagos

== Rivers State ==
See: List of hospitals in PH

== See also ==
- List of teaching hospitals in Nigeria
