= Early career doctors in Nigeria =

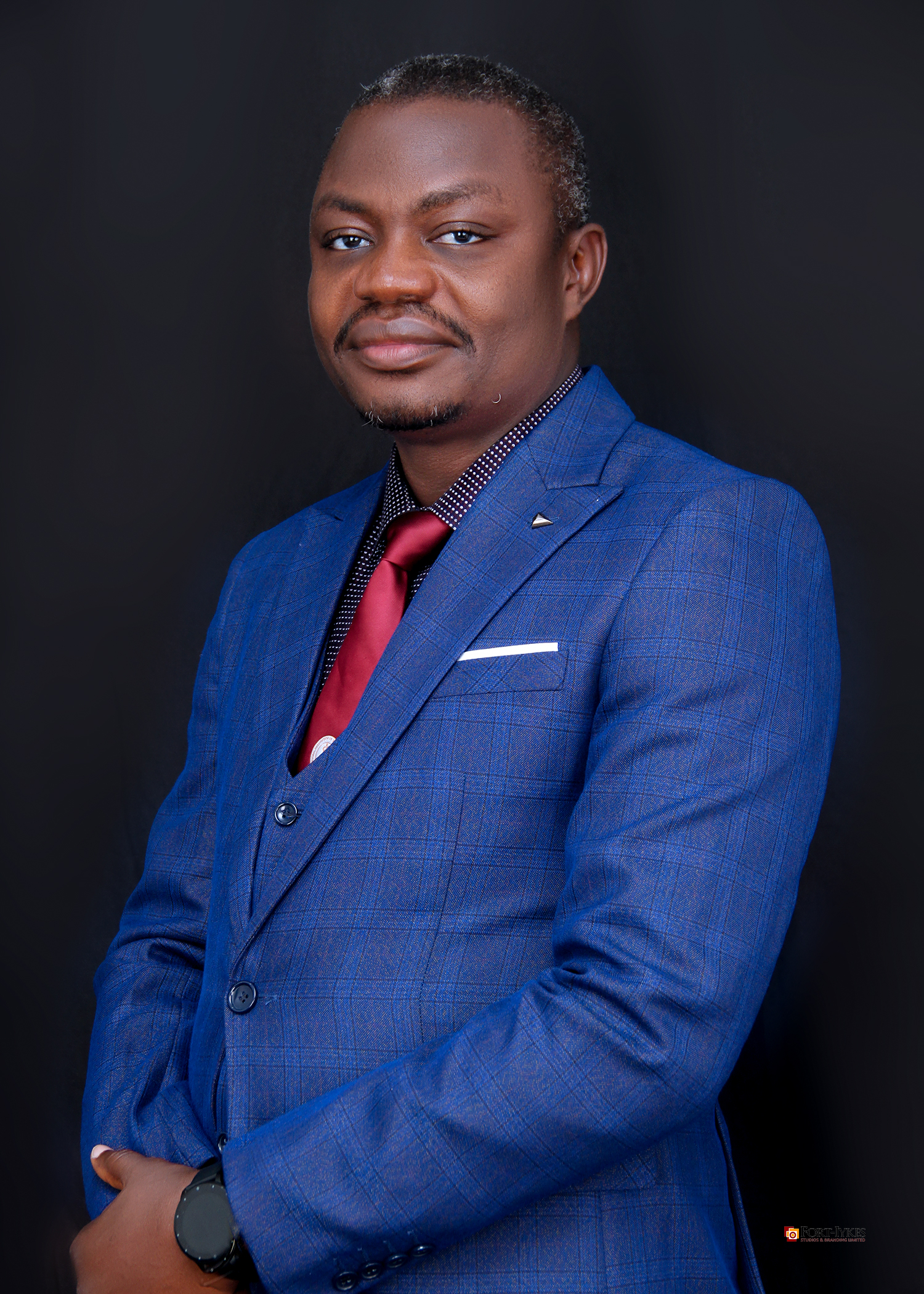
Dr Dare Godiya Ishaya, President of Nigerian Association of Resident Doctors (NARD)2022

In Nigeria, an early career doctor (ECD) is a medical or dental practitioner in the early phase of their professional career post-graduation. This includes house officers, resident doctors and medical officers below the rank of principal medical/dental officer (PMO/PDO). This term is more widely used in Nigeria compared to the junior doctor in the United Kingdom and Australia. Although Junior Doctors may seem synonymous with ECDs, ECDs embrace more cadres of doctors than junior doctors especially as it is in the UK or Australia. They may be engaged in training or non-training position at this point in their professional development. Those in training positions while rendering service include House physician or house surgeon and resident doctors. While medical officers and senior medical officers or the dentistry categories are in the non-training position. Generally, this period usually spans about the start of a career to fifteen years depending on the path an early career doctor chose for their professional development.

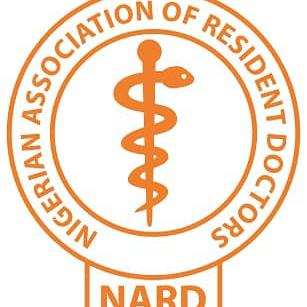
Logo of NARD

The overarching organisation of ECDs in Nigeria is the Nigerian Association of Resident Doctors(NARD) which was formerly called National Association of Resident Doctors of Nigeria(NARD), an affiliate of Nigerian Medical Association(NMA). It has 74 branches domiciled mainly in Federally and State-owned Teaching Hospitals, Specialist Hospitals and Public health institutions of the Federal Capital Territory.

== History of nomenclature ==
The term ECDs recently had a surge in popularity especially with the use of the term in the Challenges of Residency Training and Early Career Doctors in Nigeria (CHARTING) study which is a large multi-centre and multidisciplinary study in Nigeria to explore ECDs related themes. Also in recent publications by NARD.

The earliest use of the term in literature was by Milne et al. in 2013. Interestingly it was the United Kingdom where term such as Junior doctors is more pervasive. While the later also occasionally used in Australia and in these two locations are essentially describing medical trainees whether interns or residents doctors and excludes dental practitioners.

== Union ==
NARD is the largest affiliate of the Nigerian Medical Association and is in some quarters regarded as the militant wing of the medical profession. This probably stems from her various roles over the years advocating and fighting for improved welfare of doctors and the health profession as a whole. There is no gainsaying that the medical profession taps into and relies on the energy and vigour of this group of relatively young men and women. Thus, it is incontrovertible that NARD has been the arrowhead of most of the gains made by the medical profession in the last four decades.

Sadly, some of these struggles have had to be prosecuted with industrial actions. Paradoxically, in as much as government hates to hear the word "strike", it remains the language government understands most and often responds to in Nigeria. This is rather unfortunate as no doctor likes to abandon his patients, but the quest for self-survival and preservation usually leaves him with no other option. Interestingly, the Hippocratic Oath has been revised in recent times to accommodate the fact that the physician needs to also take care of himself to enable him to attend to others.

Right from inception in the late seventies, NARD had picked up the gauntlet, and one of the earliest struggles was the issue of call allowance, which the Alhaji Shehu Shagari's civilian government eventually approved. NARD and NMA went on a collision course with the succeeding military regime of General Muhammadu Buhari over improvement in hospital facilities, overseas clinical attachment for her members and sundry welfare issues, and the military junta proscribed both associations.

Leaders of the association had to take cover for their dear lives, and this period remains one of the darkest moments in the profession as it is believed this might have fuelled the brain drain of the eighties. After the Babangida regime lifted her proscription, NARD resumed from where it stopped and embarked on a national strike in late 1992, and this led to the first-ever review of the old Medical Salary Scale (MSS). It is pertinent to note that NMA had championed the negotiations for the new salary scale CONMESS, it was a NARD strike of April 2010 that eventually led to it is implementation.

2014 will remain a year to remember in the annals of medical unionism as NARD and NMA both went on strike again in July. The demands were improved facilities, relativity, universal health coverage, amidst other things. Collateral damage from this strike was the suspension of residency training by the Jonathan administration in a bid to force the almost two-month strike at the peak of the Ebola crisis to end. More recently, NARD advocated and fought to ensure the residency training act was passed into law by the parliament and subsequently assented to by President Muhammadu Buhari. She also followed up to ensure implementation of this Act by relevant parastatals of government and teaching hospitals. She also had to roll out the tanks to demand special COVID-19 inducement allowances to all health workers and the implementation of death in the service insurance policy for all health workers.

Over the years, different regimes have responded to these struggles in varying ways. There have been threats of sackings and actual sackings, which have left President Buhariwith some scars from previous battles. However, NARD as a union has remained steadfast and resolute in playing the role of lead advocate for improved welfare of doctors. Modest gains made over the years. but the fate and the future of the profession rests squarely on her shoulders. NARD has also had to learn subtle diplomacy using the National Assembly, especially the receptive leadership of the 8th and 9th assembly in pursuing her legitimate demands. History was made on 13 April 2021 when the Speaker of the House of Representatives, Right Honourable Femi Gbajabiamila, led a few other house members to meet with the association at the NARD secretariat. This was a follow up of a recently suspended industrial action where the house had again played a conciliatory role.

== Workplace and labour issues ==
The early career doctor in Nigeria is faced with myriad challenges and issues, most especially, in the workplace as it relates to their work and their career progression. These challenges are numerous and unique because of the peculiar circumstances surrounding medical practice and the health sector in general in Nigeria.

=== Salaries ===
ECDs are faced with the issue of poor remuneration for the work they do. For the long hours of work and the amount of stress they go through daily, inclusive of weekends, the salary they are paid is not commensurate. They are also poor compensated compared to there counterparts in other part of the world. Annual compensation for South African counterpart is ($80,000-128,000), and United Kingdom($34,000-50,000). Whenever they choose to ask for better pay and better working conditions, they are either harassed and threatened by the government itself or they are blackmailed by their fellow citizens with the Hippocratic Oath. They might have no other options than to resort to industrial actions to press home their demands.

=== Work Overload ===
Work overload is, by far, the commonest issue facing the ECD in Nigeria. This is because of the dearth of doctors working in the nation's public hospitals. According to Nigeria's Ministry of Health, the ratio of Nigerian doctors to the population is about 1:2753 which translates to about 36.6 doctors per 100, 000 people. This number falls considerably short of the World Health Organization (WHO) recommended doctor-to-population ratio of between 1:600 and 1:1000. Even at that, ECDs in Nigeria who are working and are in training make up just a tiny fraction of that number. This means that the burden of the shortage of ECDs in Nigeria have to be borne by those who are on ground and available in the nation's hospitals. This translates to prolonged work hours, little time for adequate rest and recuperation, stress-related illnesses, and high burn out rates in this category of doctors.

== Career progression of ECDs in Nigeria ==
The early career doctor in Nigeria may be employed in a number of settings. These include the government civil service, otherwise known as the public sector, and the private sector. In the private sector, ECDs may gain employment into private medical practise, health maintenance organisations, public health consulting firms, and health-related non-governmental organisations where they work as medical managers or medical consultants. Career progression in the private sector depends on the individual employer. In the public sector, there are two main career paths for ECDs - the medical officer cadre and the resident doctor cadre.

The Medical officer cadre: Medical officers are doctors fully licensed by the Medical and Dental Council of Nigeria to practise in Nigeria. They provide medical, surgical and emergency medical services depending on their work setting. Promotion occurs at regular intervals and depends on the employer. For the Federal Civil Service, promotion takes place every three years. Progression in this cadre is as follows:

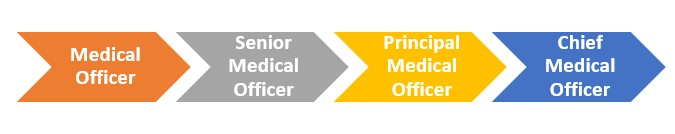

The Residency cadre: This cadre is for doctors in a fellowship training programme to be a specialist under the postgraduate medical colleges' guidance. They are referred to as resident doctors. The progression and general regulation of the programme is embedded in the Medical Residency Training Act (2017) Requirements for entrance into this cadre are undergraduate medical training from an accredited medical school, full license to practise by the Medical and Dental Council of Nigeria, and passing the Primary Fellowship examination of the postgraduate medical colleges (an exemption can be obtained from one college after passing the entrance examination of the other college). Admission into the residency training programme of a training institution could be into the Junior Residency Training Programme or the Senior Residency Training Programme.

Junior Residency Trainees are also called Registrar cadre: The junior residency training is a period is usually for the duration of at least 48 months which starts at Registrar I level. Promotion occurs yearly. Progression from this level to senior residency training is based on fulfilling the chosen speciality's training requirements as stipulated by the training colleges.

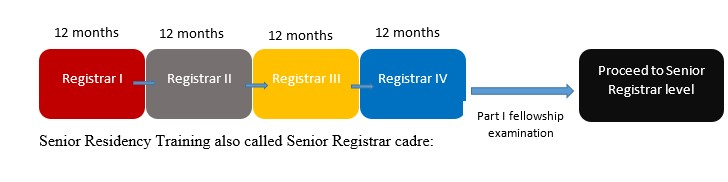

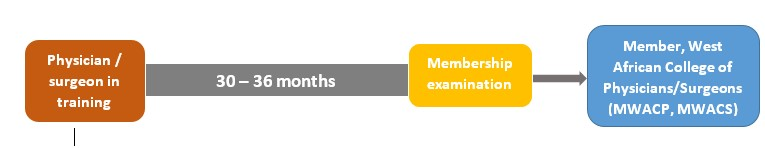

Progression is from Senior registrar II to Senior registrar I. The resident doctor is expected to fulfil the requirements of his/her chosen specialty as laid down by the training colleges within the stipulated time to become a Fellow or exit the program.

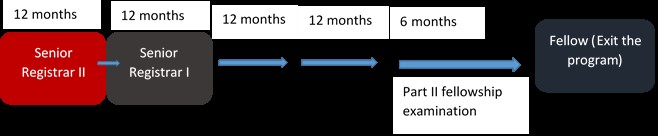

A recent modification to the residency training programme by the West African Colleges of Surgeons is in the process of adoption by the training institution. This is also a two-part training. The first stage is the membership training. This spans a period of 30 – 36 months, depending on the chosen specialty. On successful completion of the training, a membership certificate is awarded. The doctor may continue to the fellowship (sub-speciality) training or exit the training program.

The second stage is the fellowship training. This spans a period of 24 – 48 months, depending on the specialty. On successful completion, the doctor is awarded a fellowship of the West African College of Physicians or Surgeons and exits the program to practise as a specialist doctor.

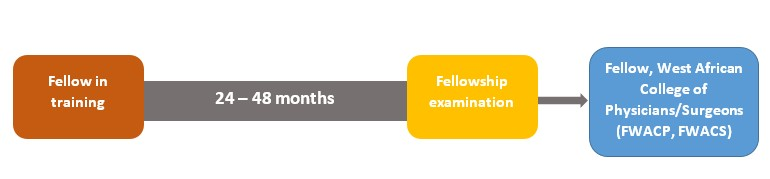
Progression during fellowship training or Senior Registrar stage of training

== Training ==
There are two postgraduate medical colleges involve in the training of resident doctors in Nigeria. They are the National Postgraduate Medical College of Nigeria(NPMCN)which wholly Nigerian and the West African Postgraduate Medical College(West African College of Physicians and West African College of Surgeons) which covers the West African region. Such training are provided by fellows of these colleges in the accredited training institutions(about 80) mainly secondary and tertiary health centres spread across Nigeria.

The postgraduate medical training in Nigeria involves three stages; an entrance examination called the Primary examination, the Part one examination and the Part two final examination. Eligibility for the primary examination is a medical graduate undergoing or has completed or been exempted from the National Youth Service Corps.

Upon gaining admission into the residency program in an accredited institution, the first examination is usually written after a specified period of training ranging from 24 months to 36 months, with success translating to a registrar's promotion to a Senior Registrar. The second examination holds after another period of a minimum of 24 months to 36 months, where the resident is expected to produce a thesis and be involved in the training of junior residents and medical students. He then becomes a fellow at the training's expiration and is expected to exit the training program six months after passing the final examination. He may be appointed a Consultant at the same institution if vacancies exist or at another facility.

The duration of residency training varies according to specialty but ranges from five to seven years. The examinations hold twice a year for each of the colleges; May/September for the National Postgraduate Medical College and April/October for the West African College of Physicians (or Surgeons). The training colleges also organize revision course and update courses which are prerequisites for participating in the college examinations.

Examples of accredited centres

NORTH - EAST GEOPOLITICAL ZONE

1. Federal Medical Center, Gombe

2. Federal Medical Center, Azare

3. Federal Medical Center, Jalingo

4. Federal Medical Center, Nguru

5. Federal Medical Center, Yola

6. Abubakar Tafawa Balewa University Teaching Hospital, Bauchi

7. Federal Neuro-Psychiatric Hospital (FNPH), Maiduguri

8. University of Maiduguri Teaching Hospital (UMTH), Maiduguri

NORTH - CENTRAL GEOPOLITICAL ZONE

1. Federal Medical Center, Keffi

2. Federal Medical Center, Bida

3. Federal Medical Center, Jabi

4. Federal Medical Center, Makurdi

5. Federal Medical Center, Lokoja

6. Association of Resident doctors (ARD), Nassarawa

7. University of Ilorin Teaching Hospital (UITH), Ilorin

8. University of Abuja Teaching Hospital, Gwagwalada

9. Benue State University Teaching Hospital (BSUTH), Makurdi

10. National Hospital, Abuja

11. Jos University Teaching Hospital (JUTH), Jos

12. Kogi State Specialist Hospital (KSSH), Lokoja

NORTH - WEST GEOPOLITICAL ZONE

1. Aminu Kano Teaching Hospital, Kano

2. Federal Medical Center, Katsina

3. Federal Medical Center, Gusau

4. Federal Medical Center, Kebbi

5. Federal Medical Center, Birmin Kudu

6. Ahmadu Bello University Teaching Hospital (ABUTH), Zaria

7. Uthman Danfodiyo University Teaching Hospital, Sokoto

8. National Orthopaedic Hospital, Dala

9. Federal Neuro-Psychiatric Hospital (FNPH), Sokoto

10. Federal Neuro-Psychiatric Hospital (FNPH), Kaduna

11. National Eye Center, Kaduna

12. National Ear Care Centre, Kaduna

SOUTH - WEST GEOPOLITICAL ZONE
1. Lagos University Teaching Hospital (LUTH), Lagos

2. Obafemi Awolowo University Teaching Hospital (OAUTHC), Ile-ife

3. Federal Teaching Hospital, Iddo

4. Ekiti State University Teaching Hospital, Ekiti

5. Federal Neuro-Psychiatric Hospital (FNPH), Aro

6. Federal Medical Center, Abeokuta

7. Olabisi Onabanjo University Teaching Hospital (OOUTH), Sagamu

8. Federal Medical Center, Owo

9. Federal Medical Center, Ebute Metta

10. Federal Neuro-Psychiatric Hospital (FNPH), Yaba

11. National Orthopaedic Hospital, Igbobi

12. LAUTECH Teaching Hospital, Osogbo

13. LAUTECH Teaching Hospital, Ogbomosho

14. University College Hospital, Ibadan

15. Lagos State University Teaching Hospital (LASUTH), Ikeja

SOUTH - EAST GEOPOLITICAL ZONE

1. Federal Medical Center, Umuahia

2. Federal Medical Center, Owerri

3. Abia State University Teaching Hospital, Abia

4. Nnamdi Azikiwe University Teaching Hospital (NAUTH), Nnewi

5. Federal Teaching Hospital (FETHA), Abakaliki

6. University of Nigeria Teaching Hospital, Enugu

7. Enugu State University Teaching Hospital, Enugu

8. Imo State University Teaching Hospital (IMSUTH), Orlu

9. National Orthopaedic Hospital, Enugu

10. Federal Neuro-Psychiatric Hospital (FNPH), Enugu

SOUTH - SOUTH GEOPOLITICAL ZONE

1. Federal Neuro-Psychiatric Hospital (FNPH), Benin

2. University of Uyo Teaching Hospital, Uyo

3. University of Calabar Teaching Hospital, Calabar

4. Federal Medical Centre, Yenagoa

5. University of Port Harcourt Teaching Hospital, Port-Harcourt

6. Braithwaite Memorial Specialist Hospital, Port-Harcourt

7. Niger Delta University Teaching Hospital (NDUTH), Bayelsa

8. Delta State University Teaching Hospital, Oghara

9. Federal Medical Center, Asaba

10. Irrua Specialist Teaching Hospital, Irrua

11. University of Benin Teaching Hospital (UBTH), Benin

12. Federal Neuro-Psychiatric Hospital (FNPH), Calabar

== See also ==
- Federal Medical Center, Azare

== Bibliography ==
- We are Early Career Doctors We are NARD. ISBN 978-978-57185-3-9

== See also ==
- Medical Education in Nigeria
