= Internship placement for health professionals in Nigeria =

Health training in Nigeria

Internship placement for health professionals in Nigeria refers to the compulsory, structured period of supervised clinical training that follows the completion of academic and professional health education. It serves as a transitional phase between academic instruction and independent professional practice. This phase is not only mandated by law and professional councils but is also a prerequisite for full licensure and registration across various healthcare disciplines.

In Nigeria, internship training aims to consolidate the theoretical knowledge and skills acquired during university or college education with hands on, practical experience in real world healthcare settings. It ensures that graduates demonstrate clinical competence, professional ethics, and the ability to work in multidisciplinary health teams before being allowed to practice independently.

Internships are undertaken in approved institutions that are accredited by relevant regulatory bodies. These include teaching hospitals, federal medical centers, specialist hospitals, and, in some cases, well equipped private healthcare institutions. The internship period varies in length depending on the profession but typically spans 12 months.

== Background ==
The health system in Nigeria, like many in the Global South, depends heavily on a workforce that is well trained, adequately supervised, and professionally licensed. The internship placement system emerged as a key component of health workforce development in response to the need for standardization in professional training and the assurance of safe clinical practices.

Historically, medical and allied health internships in Nigeria were less structured and often varied across regions and institutions. However, as the demand for quality healthcare grew, so did the need for reforms in how newly graduated professionals were inducted into the system. Over time, the establishment of professional regulatory councils such as the Medical and Dental Council of Nigeria (MDCN), Nursing and Midwifery Council of Nigeria (NMCN), and Pharmacy Council of Nigeria (PCN) led to the formalization and regulation of internship training.

Each health profession now has a defined curriculum or framework for internship training. These include mandatory rotations through key departments, supervised patient care, documentation, participation in clinical meetings, and periodic evaluations by senior professionals. For instance:

- Medical doctors are required to rotate through departments such as internal medicine, surgery, pediatrics, and obstetrics & gynecology.
- Pharmacists must undertake rotations in hospital pharmacy, clinical pharmacy, and community practice.
- Medical laboratory scientists gain experience in microbiology, hematology, chemical pathology, and histopathology laboratories.

The internship system also plays a critical role in addressing healthcare delivery gaps, especially in under-resourced parts of Nigeria. Interns, though still under supervision, often serve as a valuable part of the healthcare workforce.

Despite its importance, the internship placement process in Nigeria faces challenges such as oversubscription, inadequate placement centers, logistical issues, and reports of favoritism and corruption. These issues have led to calls for systemic reforms, including digital placement portals, increased funding, and equitable distribution of training centers across the country.

== Process of placement ==
Internship placement typically follows the completion of final professional examinations and the award of a qualifying degree (e.g., MBBS, B.Pharm, BMLS). The process includes:

1. Application to accredited hospitals: Graduates submit applications to institutions accredited by the relevant professional councils.
2. Selection and invitation: Based on merit, available slots, and institutional criteria, candidates are shortlisted and invited for interviews or direct placement.
3. Issuance of provisional license: Regulatory bodies issue a provisional license that enables the graduate to practice under supervision during the internship period.
4. Commencement of training: Interns rotate through various departments under supervision.
5. Evaluation and certification: At the end of the internship, interns are assessed and, if successful, awarded certificates of completion for full registration.

== Challenges ==
The internship placement process in Nigeria is often fraught with several challenges:

- Limited slots: There is often a mismatch between the number of graduating professionals and available internship positions.
- Geographic inequality: Certain regions have more accredited institutions, forcing interns to relocate.
- Delays in placement: Some graduates face prolonged waiting periods before securing placement.
- Corruption and favoritism: Allegations of nepotism, bribery, and favoritism in the selection process are common.
- Delayed remuneration: Some interns face late payment or non payment of stipends.
- Poor working conditions: Interns sometimes work under suboptimal conditions with limited supervision and infrastructure.

== Regulatory oversight ==
Each professional council oversees internship training through the accreditation of centers, regulation of internship standards, and evaluation of the interns. Some of the major regulatory bodies include:

- Medical and Dental Council of Nigeria (MDCN)
- Nursing and Midwifery Council of Nigeria (NMCN)
- Pharmacists Council of Nigeria (PCN)
- Medical Laboratory Science Council of Nigeria (MLSCN)

These councils publish lists of accredited institutions and monitor compliance with internship guidelines.

== Recent developments ==
- In 2020, the Federal Ministry of Health and MDCN introduced reforms to streamline the posting process for medical interns.
- There have been growing calls for a centralized internship placement system, similar to the National Youth Service Corps (NYSC) model.
- The Nigerian Association of Resident Doctors (NARD) and other health unions have repeatedly called on the government to increase funding and transparency in the internship process.

== See also ==
- Early career doctors in Nigeria
- Medical education in Nigeria
- Health care in Nigeria
- National Youth Service Corps
- Education in Nigeria
- Pharmacists Council of Nigeria
- Medical internship
