= Obesity in Nigeria =

Obesity-waist circumference

Obesity in Nigeria is an emerging public health challenge, driven by rapid urbanization, lifestyle changes, and dietary habits. While undernutrition has historically been a major health concern in the country, obesity and overweight cases have increased significantly in recent years. This shift is largely influenced by economic growth, urbanization, and westernized dietary patterns.

== Prevalence ==
Obesity rates in Nigeria have been on the rise, particularly in urban areas. According to the World Health Organization (WHO), the prevalence of overweight and obesity among adults in Nigeria has increased steadily. Studies indicate that approximately 20–35% of Nigerian adults are overweight, with obesity rates ranging between 8–22%, depending on gender and socioeconomic status. Women tend to have higher obesity rates compared to men, particularly in urban centers.

== Causes ==
=== Dietary changes ===
The increased consumption of processed foods, sugary beverages, and fast foods high in fats and carbohydrates has significantly contributed to obesity in Nigeria. Many people, especially in urban areas, rely on fast food due to convenience and affordability. These foods are often high in unhealthy fats, sugars, and calories while lacking essential nutrients. The rise in Western-style eating habits, influenced by globalization and economic growth, has also contributed to a decline in traditional diets that were rich in fiber, vegetables, and lean proteins. This shift in eating patterns has led to higher caloric intake without a corresponding increase in physical activity, causing weight gain and obesity.

Moreover, the marketing strategies of multinational food companies have played a role in promoting unhealthy eating habits. Advertisements targeting both adults and children encourage the consumption of processed snacks and sugary drinks, which further exacerbates the obesity crisis. In addition, the affordability of processed foods compared to healthier alternatives, such as fresh fruits and vegetables, makes it easier for people to opt for unhealthy choices. Without significant dietary changes, the increasing trend of obesity will continue to pose a major public health challenge in Nigeria.

=== Sedentary lifestyle ===
The shift from traditional labor intensive occupations to office jobs and increased screen time has led to reduced physical activity, contributing significantly to obesity in Nigeria. Many Nigerians now work in environments that require minimal movement, such as corporate offices, where they spend long hours sitting at desks. This reduction in physical exertion, combined with easy access to high-calorie foods, has resulted in weight gain and an increased risk of obesity-related diseases. Additionally, the widespread use of technology, including smartphones, computers, and televisions, has contributed to a more sedentary lifestyle, as people engage in passive activities rather than active ones.

Beyond the workplace, leisure activities have also changed, further reducing physical activity levels. In the past, children and adults engaged in outdoor games and physical labor, but today, many prefer indoor entertainment, such as watching television or playing video games. Public spaces that encourage exercise, such as parks and recreational centers, are limited in many Nigerian cities, making it difficult for people to engage in regular physical activity. Without conscious efforts to promote exercise and reduce sedentary behavior, obesity rates will likely continue to rise.

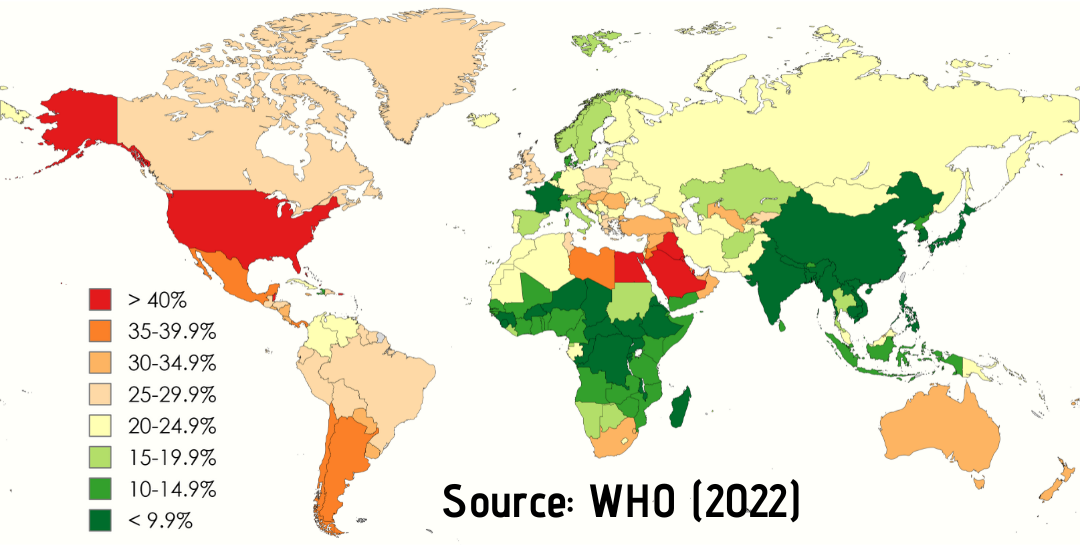
Obesity rate (WHO, 2022)

=== Urbanization and economic growth ===
Urbanization and economic growth have provided many Nigerians with better job opportunities and improved living standards, but they have also contributed to rising obesity rates. Urban dwellers often have easier access to high-calorie foods due to the availability of supermarkets, restaurants, and fast-food outlets. Unlike rural populations, where people engage in farming and other physically demanding activities, urban residents are more likely to have sedentary jobs and lifestyles. This combination of high-calorie food consumption and reduced physical activity has fueled the obesity epidemic in many Nigerian cities.

Furthermore, urbanization has led to increased reliance on transportation systems such as buses, motorcycles, and private vehicles, reducing the amount of walking people do daily. In rural areas, walking long distances for work, school, or market activities contributes to maintaining a healthy weight, but in urban centers, convenience has replaced physical exertion. Additionally, the cost of living in cities often makes healthy foods more expensive than processed alternatives, leading many to choose less nutritious, high-calorie meals. Addressing these challenges requires policies that promote healthier urban environments, such as the development of parks, sidewalks, and accessible fitness centers.

=== Cultural perceptions ===
In some Nigerian communities, being overweight is associated with affluence, good health, and high social status. Historically, a fuller body was seen as a sign of wealth and prosperity, especially in regions where food scarcity was once a concern. In many cultures, larger body sizes are still considered attractive, leading some individuals to intentionally gain weight. This perception discourages people from actively pursuing weight management strategies, even when faced with health risks associated with obesity.

Additionally, societal expectations and family pressure can make it difficult for individuals to adopt healthier lifestyles. Some people may feel ashamed to engage in weight loss efforts because it contradicts cultural norms that associate thinness with poverty or illness. As a result, public health campaigns aimed at addressing obesity must also focus on changing these cultural perceptions. Educating communities about the health risks of obesity and promoting body positivity in a way that encourages fitness and well-being, rather than just weight gain, is essential in tackling the obesity crisis.

=== Genetics ===
Some individuals have a genetic predisposition to obesity, which may be exacerbated by environmental factors. Genetic factors influence metabolism, fat storage, and the body's ability to regulate weight. People with a family history of obesity are more likely to gain weight easily, especially when exposed to unhealthy diets and sedentary lifestyles. However, while genetics play a role, they do not solely determine a person's weight. Lifestyle choices such as diet, exercise, and overall activity level can help mitigate the effects of genetic predisposition.

In Nigeria, limited awareness of genetic influences on obesity means that many people may not understand why they struggle with weight gain despite efforts to maintain a healthy lifestyle. This lack of knowledge can lead to frustration and a feeling of helplessness. However, adopting personalized nutrition and exercise plans, along with medical guidance, can help individuals with genetic predispositions to obesity manage their weight effectively. Public health initiatives should incorporate genetic education to encourage healthier lifestyles and preventive measures.

=== Lack of awareness ===
Many Nigerians are unaware of the health risks associated with obesity, leading to poor dietary and lifestyle choices. There is limited public education on the dangers of obesity-related diseases, such as diabetes, hypertension, and heart disease. As a result, many individuals do not see the urgency of maintaining a healthy weight. The lack of nutritional knowledge also means that people continue to consume high-calorie diets without understanding their long-term effects on health.

Additionally, the absence of widespread obesity prevention programs has contributed to the issue. Unlike in developed countries where health campaigns emphasize weight management, Nigeria has fewer public initiatives focused on obesity awareness. Many people do not have access to proper guidance on balanced diets and physical activity. To combat this problem, the government, healthcare providers, and community leaders must work together to educate the public on obesity prevention and encourage healthier lifestyle choices.

== Health implications ==
Obesity poses significant health risks, contributing to the rising prevalence of Non Communicable Diseases (NCDs) worldwide, including in Nigeria. One of the most concerning implications is its strong association with cardiovascular diseases such as hypertension and heart disease, both of which can lead to severe complications like heart attacks or heart failure. Obesity is a leading cause of type 2 diabetes, a condition that is becoming increasingly common in Nigeria due to lifestyle changes and dietary habits. High cholesterol levels and elevated blood pressure, often seen in obese individuals, also increase the risk of stroke, which can result in long-term disability or death. Furthermore, obesity has been linked to certain types of cancer, including breast and colorectal cancer, adding to the burden of disease. Respiratory disorders such as sleep apnea and asthma are also more prevalent among obese individuals, as excess weight can restrict airflow and impair lung function. Beyond physical health, obesity can have serious psychological effects, contributing to mental health challenges like depression and low self esteem. Given these risks, tackling obesity through lifestyle modifications, including a balanced diet and regular physical activity, is essential for preventing these life-threatening conditions and improving overall well being.

== See also ==
- Health in Nigeria
- Epidemiology of obesity
