= Houseboy =

Male domestic worker or personal assistant

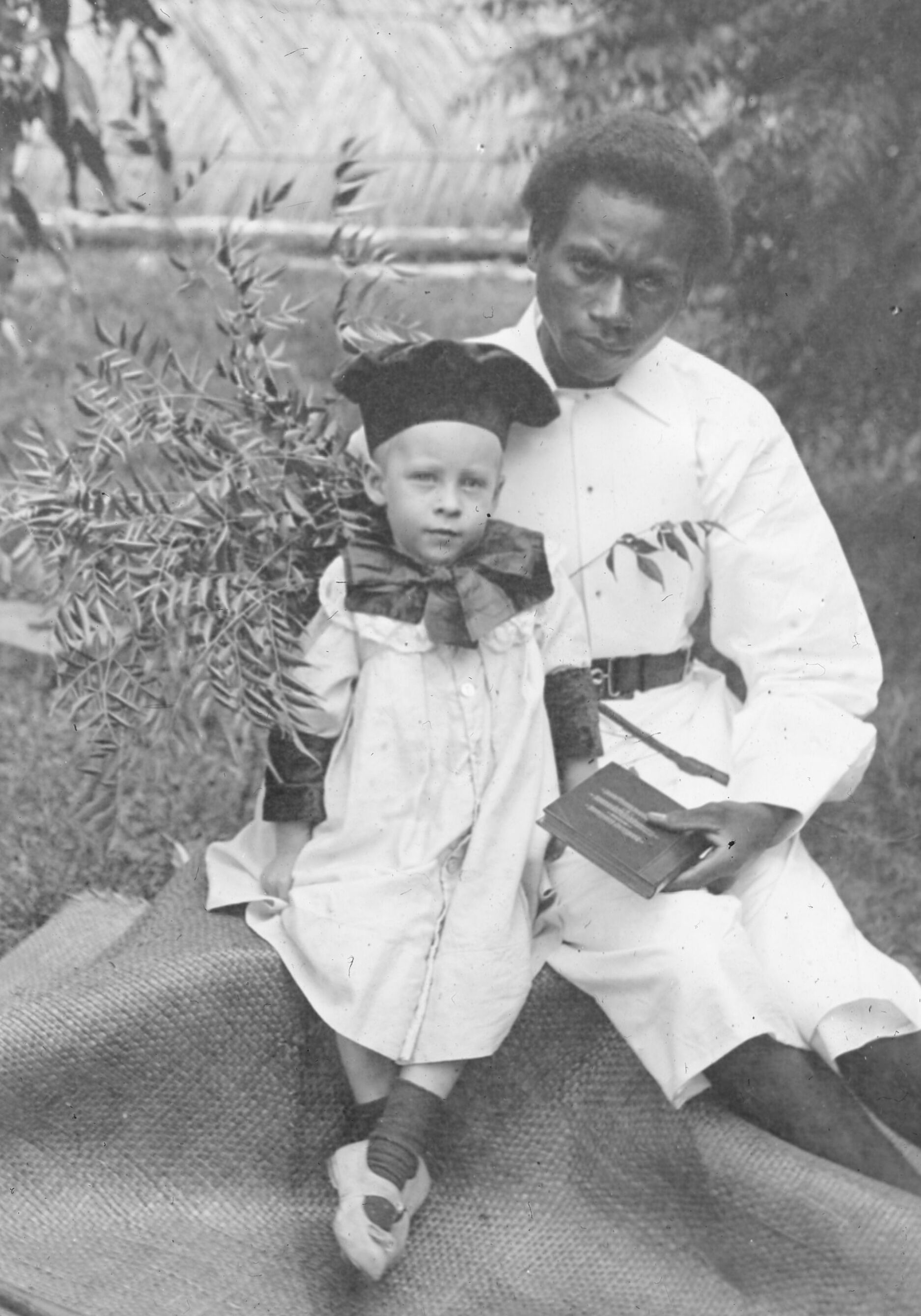
- Houseboy with child in New Guinea, c. 1930s

Occupation
- Occupation type: Domestic labour
- Activity sectors: Housework

Description
- Related jobs: Maid

Houseboy is a term which refers to a typically male domestic worker or personal assistant who performs cleaning and other forms of personal chores. The term has a record of being used in the British Empire and the military.

== United Kingdom ==
Historically, houseboy was a term used in the United Kingdom of Great Britain and Ireland for a male domestic servant. Houseboys were usually, but not always, native people who worked for a British family living in the non-British regions of the empire. A female housecleaner was termed a housegirl. Both sexes often wore uniform, due to their status as domestic servants.

== Military slang ==
Houseboy was also used as an American slang term originating in the Second World War for a young teenager who helped American soldiers perform basic responsibilities like cleaning, laundry, ironing, shoe-shining, running errands, etc. The British English term for this occupation was 'Batman'.

== See also ==
- Housekeeper
- Fagging
- wikt:Garçon, the French word for "boy", also used as an occupational title
- House officer, previously "houseman", various grades of doctor in British hospitals
- House slave, as opposed to field slaves, during the period of slavery in the United States
