= Smoking in Nigeria =

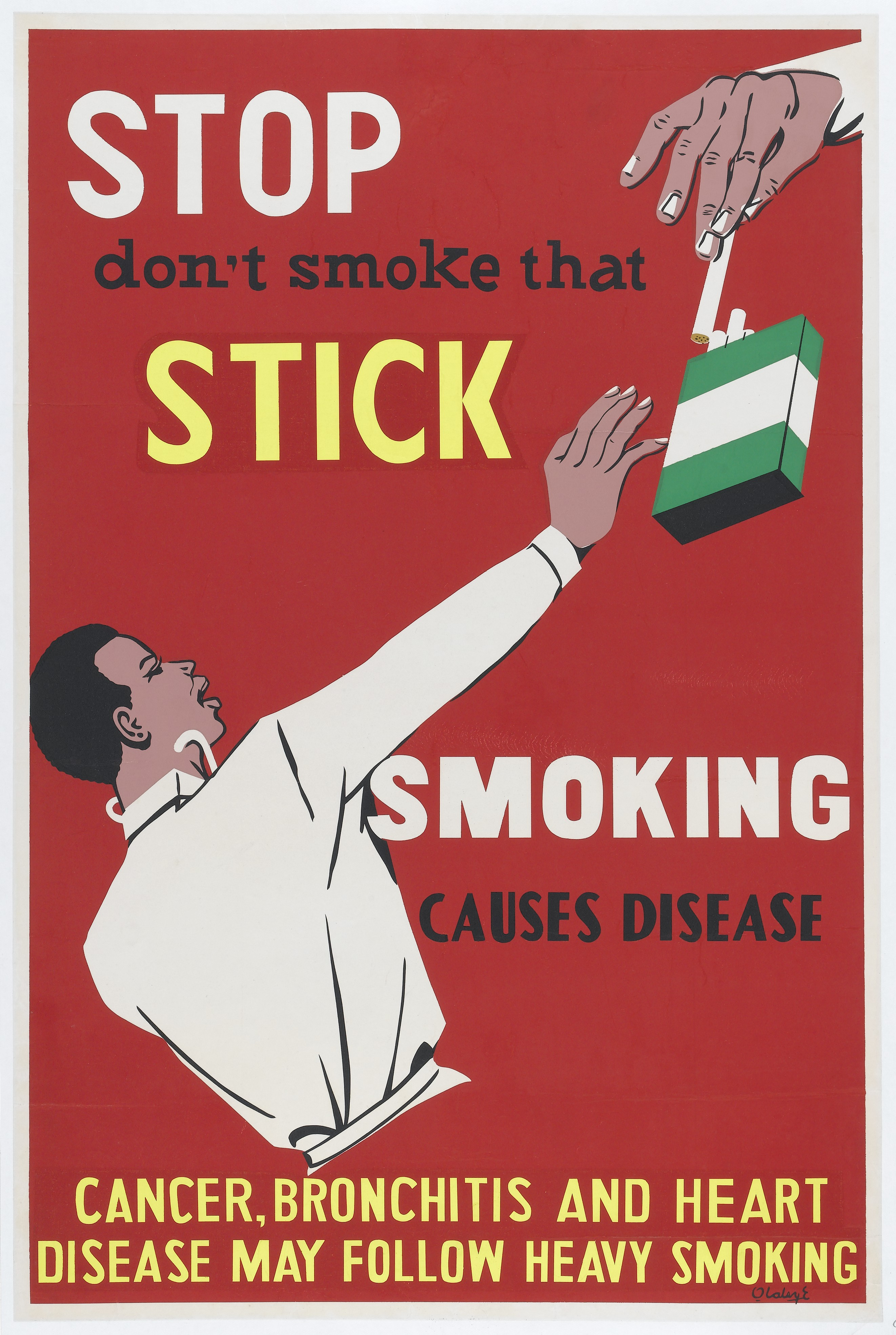
An anti smoking print from Nigeria; produced in the 1950s.

Smoking in Nigeria is illegal in public places. It is punishable by a fine of not less than 50,000 nor exceeding 100,000.00 naira, or by imprisonment to a term of 10 years minimum or your life, or by both a fine and imprisonment.

In Nigeria, anti-tobacco communities are at the forefront of ensuring smoke-free public places. Over 40 civil society groups, legal practitioners, and public health advocates stormed the Senate Hearing Room of the National Assembly Complex in Abuja on July 21 and 22 to present their memorandum in support of the National Tobacco Control Bill, (NTCB) 2009.

The Nigerian National Tobacco Control Bill is a comprehensive law which when passed will regulate the manufacturing, advertising distribution, and consumption of tobacco products in Nigeria.

It is a bill that is aimed at domesticating the Framework Convention on Tobacco Control (FCTC) because Nigeria is a party to that international convention. Nigeria signed the WHO FCTC in 2004 and ratified it in 2005. It enacted the National Tobacco Control Act (NTCA Act) 2015 to accommodate the provisions of the WHO FCTC.

The key highlights of the bill are the ban of smoking in public places, including restaurants and bars, public transport, schools, and hospitals. It also invokes a ban on all forms of direct and indirect tobacco advertising and prohibition of sales of cigarettes within a 1-kilometre radius of designated non-smoking areas, and the formation of a committee that will guide the government on the issue of tobacco control in the country.

== National Tobacco Control Bill 2009 ==
- It repeals the Tobacco (Control) Act 1990 CAP. T16 Laws of the Federation.
- Completely domesticates the Framework Convention on Tobacco Control (FCTC).
- It establishes the National Tobacco Control Committee.
- The National Tobacco Control Act 2009 will come to force six months from the date of assent.
- Every packet of tobacco for sale in Nigeria must carry the statement “Sales allowed only in Nigeria”.
- Every tobacco product manufactured in Nigeria for export must bear "Manufactured in Nigeria for Export”.
- Every packet of cigarette must bear:
1. Name and license number of the manufacturer/wholesaler/importer/exporter;
2. Serial number, date, location and country of manufacture;
3. Clearly visible “tax” stamp or marking.
- It prohibits the sale of cigarette to persons under 18.
- It prohibits the sale of tobacco products through vending machines.
- Prohibits the sale of cigarette in single sticks.
- Every cigarette pack must contain minimum of 20 sticks.
- No mail delivery of cigarette to consumers.
- Stipulates warning labels / health messages to cover at least 50 per cent of the principal display areas.
- The Health Minister can help us regulate format the health warnings/messages to include pictograms.
- It prohibits all forms of tobacco advertisement, sponsorships and promotions, endorsements or testimonials, sales promotions.
- Prohibits smoking in public places including restaurants and bars, public transportation, schools etc.
- Prohibition of the sale of tobacco products 1,000 meter radius places designated as non–smoking.
- Empowers government to use litigation to recoup liabilities related to tobacco consumption.

The NIGERIA NATIONAL TOBACCO CONTROL BILL blog, managed by ERA/FOEN features articles and news stories on the development and progress of this all important legislation. Environmental Rights Action (ERA) is a Nigerian advocacy non-governmental organization founded on January 11, 1993, to deal with environmental human rights issues in Nigeria. ERA is the Nigerian chapter of Friends of the Earth International (FoEI), the world environmental justice federation campaigning to protect the environment and to create sustainable societies.

== See also ==
- Health in Nigeria
- Smoking Ban
