= Cardiovascular disease in Nigeria =

Cardiovascular disease in Nigeria represents a significant public health concern and is among the leading causes of mortality in the country. The rise in cardiovascular diseases is closely linked to urbanization and the increasing prevalence of hypertension and diabetes.

== Overview ==
Cardiovascular diseases refer to a group of disorders of the heart and blood vessels. The most common forms include hypertension (high blood pressure), coronary artery disease, stroke, heart failure, rheumatic heart disease, and congenital heart disease.

In Nigeria, cardiovascular diseases account for a substantial proportion of hospital admissions and deaths, and are reported to be increasing.

== Prevalence, Risk Factors, & Challenges for Treatment ==
Recent epidemiological studies found that between 23–34% of Nigerian adults have hypertension. Urban populations tend to have a higher prevalence compared to rural communities, primarily due to increases in salt/alcohol consumption, sedentary lifestyles, and obesity. Strokes, typically caused by hypertension or diabetes, are the second highest cause of death in Nigeria not attributable to communicable diseases.

Rheumatic heart disease, which results from rheumatic fever, is prevalent across sub-Saharan Africa, including Nigeria. It is the most common cause of cardiovascular disease in individuals under 25 years old.

Several factors contribute to the increasing occurrence of cardiovascular diseases in Nigeria, including hypertension and socioeconomic factors such and poverty and insufficient healthcare infrastructure. Less than 5% of the Nigeria's population has health insurance coverage.

Nigeria's healthcare system may not be particularly well-equipped to diagnose and treat cardiovascular disease, due to a lack of cardiologists, public health awareness and affordable medications. The problem is exacerbated by insufficient government health spending, high levels of poverty, and low levels of preventative care.

However, implementing programmes like public health insurance has shown promise in addressing components of this problem. The 2016 National Health Policy proposed an increase in screening programmes to promote early detection of cardiovascular problems.

== See also ==
- Health in Nigeria
- Non-communicable diseases
- World Health Organization
