= Medical education in Nigeria =

Study of medical sciences in Nigeria

Undergraduate medical education in Nigeria started in 1948 in Ibadan, based wholly on a British curriculum. Since then, medical schools expanded across the country, and medical universities now exist in almost every state, including federal, state and private universities. Medical education in Nigeria is controlled by the National Universities Commission (NUC), and the Medical and Dental Council of Nigeria (MDCN).

== Background ==
In 1927, the government set up a five-year diploma programme to train medical manpower; it was ineffective as the teachers and facilities were inadequate to train doctors to standards acceptable outside the country. The doctors were trained to practice only in Nigeria and were subjected to differential conditions of service compared to foreign-trained doctors. The ineffectiveness eventually led to its abolishment. In 1948, a college branch of the University of London was set up in Ibadan, and the graduates were to be trained at par with British counterparts and awarded a degree of the University of London. This birthed undergraduate medical education in Nigeria.

== Education ==
=== Undergraduate ===
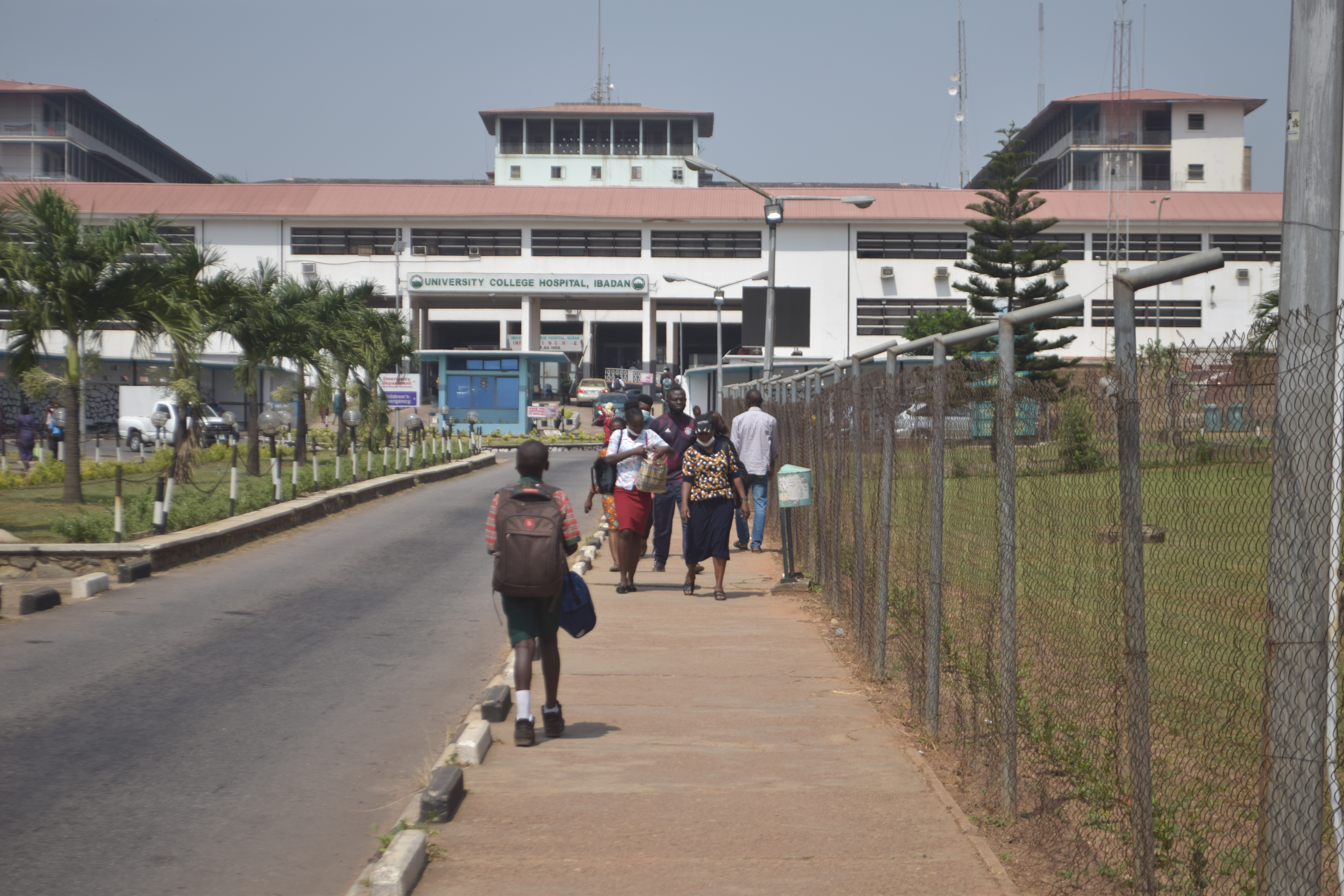

The undergraduate medical education in Nigeria lasts at least six years in the university. The first year is spent in the Faculty of Science studying mainly physics, chemistry and zoology, and some general subjects. The pre-clinical years last approximately 18 months, involving classroom lectures and laboratory work for about nine hours each day, and more time for dedicated self-study. The courses taken are all compulsory and include anatomy, physiology, and biochemistry. Success in the professional examination qualifies the student to proceed to the clinical years of study. Most of the next three and a half years is spent in the teaching hospital. Subjects studied include pharmacology and pathology, which is laboratory-based and continues until the fourth year of study.

The final two years of medical school are spent in the clinical sciences. All the principles learnt in the preceding years are applied to the care of human patients. Paediatrics, obstetrics and gynaecology, community medicine, surgery, medicine are taught at this level. Following success in the final Professional Medical School Examination, the individual obtains a provisional license to practice medicine under supervision for a year in Nigeria by the Medical and Dental Council of Nigeria (MDCN). The accreditation of medical and dental schools in Nigeria and minimum training standards are the joint responsibility of the MDCN and the National Universities Commission (NUC). Currently, in Nigeria there exist 42 medical schools, of which 17 are federal, 18 are state institutions, and seven are privately owned.

=== Postgraduate ===
Postgraduate medical education broadly includes pre-registration training of house-officers, specialist and sub-specialist training obtained after undergraduate medical education. Academic diplomas, Masters and PhD training are undertaken by medically qualified doctors receiving residency training, continuing medical education, and continuing professional development.

The residency training programme in Nigeria was formally commenced by the NMC3, now known as the Medical and Dental Council of Nigeria (MDCN), after the amendment in section 7A of the Medical and Dental Practitioners' Act of 1963, by Decree 44 of 1969. In 1972 the first examinations were held, and by 1976 the first set of trainees had completed training. Before this, there was no postgraduate specialist medical training in West Africa. Later, the National Medical College Act, Decree 67, of 24 September 1979, now Cap N 59 Laws of the Federation 2004, transferred the responsibility for postgraduate medical education from the MDCN to the National Postgraduate Medical College of Nigeria (NPMCN). In January 1975, the West African Postgraduate Medical College (WAPMC), a specialised agency of the West African Health Community (WAHC), was established to serve as an umbrella college for the West African College of Physicians (WACP) and the West African College of Surgeons (WACS). The first examinations took place in October 1979.

The NPMCN and the WAPMC share the responsibility of formal postgraduate medical education in Nigeria, which produces competent clinical specialists. They produce the curricula, accredit training institutions, conduct professional postgraduate examinations and certify candidates. To obtain a fellowship by examination, which is currently the highest of the colleges' earned qualifications, a medical graduate of an MDCN-approved institution has to undergo a residency training programme of not less than four years in a health facility approved by the college senate. The doctor needs to be successful in the primary examination and the Parts I and II Examinations of the relevant faculty during the residency training period after having met other training requirements. The colleges approve the award of diplomas as middle-level, sub-fellowship certifications in areas with critical shortages. These areas include anaesthesiology, family medicine, radiology, otorhinolaryngology and pathology.

== Challenges ==
The challenges of medical education in Nigeria include but are not limited to inadequate funding, poor planning, and erosion of values. Nigerian medical students and graduates perceive a declining standard and quality in their medical training; the quality of instruction, quality of training facilities, quality of support and frequent industrial actions are also highlighted. The imbalance of state government funding has strained federal government facilities. The available placement opportunities in the very few accredited centres for postgraduate training are few and inadequate compared to the number of doctors graduating each year. Many factors affect the selection process, also affecting the quality of training. There is a shortage of critical manpower across specialities, which is exaggerated across the socio-political zones and also urban–rural disparities. Resident doctors are poorly remunerated, overworked, have no clear job descriptions, and train in hostile work environments. Some have expressed doubt that the postgraduate colleges' curricula are in sync with global best practices, while the opportunity for additional exposure abroad is no more accessible. There is also poor monitoring and evaluation of training programmes, and currently, no formal training programme in medical education is available in Nigeria.

== Addressing challenges ==
Nigerian medical education has produced most of the academic staff in Nigerian medical schools and leadership capacities including vice-chancellors, presidents of postgraduate colleges, chief medical directors, state commissioners and federal ministers. The research output in Nigerian healthcare is a product of medical education. Medical graduates who pursue postgraduate training abroad attest to the acceptable foundation of Nigerian undergraduate medical education. Medical education has implications for regional development, primarily to ensure adequacy and efficiency in the health sector as recommended by the World Health Organization. Possible ways to tackle challenges may include:

- Improved funding
- Evidence-based revision of curriculum and the application of current methodologies of teaching and learning in medical education
- Strengthening mentoring programs
- Enhancing the research capacity of students, trainees and faculty to stimulate locally driven research and subsequently translate knowledge to public health approaches
- Training and retraining of faculty; the NPMCN can organise diploma or certificate courses in medical education
- Better synergy between the NUC, MDCN and postgraduate colleges to harmonise standards of training
- Establishment of more medical schools and teaching hospitals for training
