= Internship (medicine) =

Clinical training for advanced students in medicine

A medical (or surgical) intern is a physician in training who has completed medical school and has a medical degree, but does not yet have a license to practice medicine unsupervised. Under the guidance of senior doctors, interns will learn how to diagnose and treat patients, handle medical records and deal with different clinical situations. Medical education generally ends with a period of practical training similar to internship, but the way the overall program of academic and practical medical training is structured differs depending upon the country, as does the terminology used (see medical education and medical school for further details).

== Australia ==
In Australia, medical graduates must complete one year in an accredited hospital post before they receive full registration. This year of conditional registration is called the intern year. An internship is not necessarily completed in a hospital at the same state as the graduate's medical school.

== Austria ==
In Austria, the sixth and final year of medical school is called "Klinisch-praktisches Jahr" or "KPJ" (literally translated: clinical practical year). In this internship students complete at least three rotations in surgical and non-surgical specialties before they finish medical school. After graduation and before starting residency, new doctors must complete a 9 months long "Basisausbildung" (literally translated: basic training). In this time, they are supposed to acquire the most important ("basic") practical skills for practicing medicine regardless of their future specialty and are supervised by a board-certified specialist. After completion, new doctors are allowed to decide whether they want to complete residency ("Facharztausbildung") or the so-called "Turnus", which is the approx. 3.5 year long training in general medicine. Only after successfully completing residency or the "Turnus" and subsequent board-certification, doctors are allowed to practice medicine unsupervised.

== Brazil ==
In Brazil, medical school consists of six years or twelve semesters. The final two years (or one and a half years, depending on the university in question) are the internship. During this time, students work extensive hospital hours and do basic hospital work while supervised by residents and staff. This period is usually divided among internal medicine, surgery, gynecology and obstetrics, pediatrics, emergency medicine, family medicine, and a final elective period in which the student chooses an area for further experience. On conclusion of the internship, the student becomes a doctor and may work unsupervised or enter a residency program to gain a specialty.

== China ==
The basic medical license in China is granted by examination. Those with a bachelor's degree in medicine are allowed to participate in the exam after one year of internship. Those with an associate's degree are allowed to participate after two years of internship in primary care using an assistant physician's license. Those with a professional degree are allowed to participate after 5 years of internship in primary care using the same license.

A further internship system for Chinese medical practitioners is called guīpéi (规培, short for Chinese: 住院医师规范化培训; lit. 'standardized training for residential physicians'). This program consists of a minimum of 3 years of rotating (轮转) across secondary care departments. Interns have reported long hours, poor pay, repetitive work, and a lack of respect under this system, with a wave of suicides in January 2024. Guipei grants a further certificate, considered indispensable for career advancement. Being hired at a government-run hospital virtually requires this certificate, as hospitals prefer doctors that can work unsupervised (主治).

The guipei system has been in place since 1993. The latest system-wide rules were set in 2013, though some specific divisions have received updates since. For example, a new 2024 rule requires physicians who majored in traditional Chinese medicine to rotate through at least 15 departments in addition to the 3-year requirement.

=== Hong Kong ===
In Hong Kong, anyone who is awarded a bachelor's degree in medicine from the University of Hong Kong or the Chinese University of Hong Kong, or holds a non-local medical degree and passes the licensing examination held by the Medical Council of Hong Kong, must practice as a houseman in a public hospital under the administration of the Hong Kong Hospital Authority for 12 months, during which a department rotates every three months, which must include internal medicine and surgery. After passing the intern assessment, they can be officially registered as medical practitioners. The salary of interns is half of the starting salary of officially registered doctors working in public hospitals, which is now about HK$36,000 per month.

== Chile ==
After high school, a medical education in Chile takes seven years—five years as a medical student and two years as an intern, earning the degree of Médico Cirujano (equivalent to general practitioner in the US). Internships minimally include the four basic specialties (internal medicine, general surgery, gynecology and obstetrics, and pediatrics). After completing the internship, the new physician may work in primary care, hospitals, or apply to residencies for a specialty.

== DR Congo ==
DR Congo has a two-year internship program for public health schools. Many hospitals employ Doctors prior to their full registration with the medical council (CNOM).

== Ecuador ==
After finishing high school, students may apply to medical school. Medical school generally consist of six years of medical school. The final year is an internship, in which students rotate through surgical and clinical specialties. Completing the program earns the student the title of Médico Cirujano (equivalent to general practitioner in the US). Additionally, a doctor must complete one year of community medicine to obtain a medical register and license from the Public Health Ministry (MSP). After this, the MD may enter a residency or apply to a specialty.

== Egypt ==
Before 2018 and upon graduating from a six-year medical school, students undergo one year of internship or clerkship training at a university or teaching hospital, officially known as the National Compulsory Medical Internship Program. During this year, a graduate must complete two-month rotations in each of general surgery, internal medicine, pediatrics, obstetrics-gynecology and emergency-anesthesiology. They also must complete one-month rotations in a sub-specialty of their choice in internal medicine and/or surgery. After 2018 the length of medical school has been reduced to five years and the internship has been extended to two years. On completion of the internship they take the Egyptian Medical Licensing Examination (EMLE) and they are licensed to practice.

== Germany ==
The last year of the medical studies in Germany is a mandatory clinical internship called Praktisches Jahr or PJ (literally translated: practical year). This internship comes without a salary. Some clinics pay a small allowance. The interns work as doctors, but are closely supervised. Doctors of medicine, who successfully finish their medical studies receive legal qualification and the status of assistant doctor immediately when taking up a medical occupation. However, they cannot enter private practice or work unsupervised until they receive a full board certification (Facharzt) in their chosen specialty.

== Ghana ==
The housemanship (internship period) is a two-year period after graduating from medical school during which newly qualified doctors, practice under supervision in designated hospitals in the country. This involves six month rotations each in medicine, surgery, obstetrics and gynecology and pediatrics, in no particular order. Alternatively, a houseman may opt to do a rotation in anesthesia or psychiatry in place of one of the traditional four rotation areas. During this period the houseman (intern) holds provisional registration status with the Ghana Medical and Dental Council. After the student successfully completes the housemanship, they receive full registration status and the rank of Medical Officer (M.O.).

== India ==
After 4.5 years of medical school to earn their MBBS degree, every doctor in India must complete a one-year Compulsory Rotating Medical Internship in various specialties to achieve permanent registration from the National Medical Commission (NMC) as a physician licensed to practice as a primary care doctor throughout India.

== Indonesia ==
Every medical graduate from an Indonesian public or private university, or from an overseas-approved institution, after an adaptation process, must apply for internship registration to the Indonesian Medical Council (Konsil Kedokteran Indonesia (KKI)). After the council approves their application, an intern must apply to the Ministry of Health (MoH) for an internship position. After the MoH accepts the application, the intern serves supervised rotations in a hospital emergency department, hospital inpatient/outpatient and public primary healthcare. After completing the internship, they receive an Internship Completion Certificate (Surat Tanda Selesai Internsip, STSI) from the MoH—which is the requirement for full registration in the KKI. A full registered doctor can practice as a general practitioner or pursue postgraduate education for a specialty and sub-specialty.

Year	Months											
Year	1	2	3	4	5	6	7	8	9	10	11	12
Before 2020	Rotation 1				Rotation 2				Rotation 3			
Before 2020	hospital emergency department				hospital inpatient/outpatient				public primary healthcare			
Before 2020	public primary healthcare				hospital emergency department				hospital inpatient/outpatient			
Before 2020	hospital inpatient/outpatient				public primary healthcare				hospital emergency department			
Since 2020	Hospital Rotation						PHC Rotation					
Since 2020	emergency department inpatient/outpatient			inpatient/outpatient emergency department			public primary healthcare					

== Iran ==
In Iran, a seven-year medical education ends with an 18-month internship in a university hospital. On completing the internship, a person may work independently as a Medical Doctor (MD) or take the National Comprehensive Residency Exam and continue studies in a specialty. If they decide to work as a General Practitioner, they must first complete compulsory service in areas the Iranian Ministry of Health has designated as under-served. The internship rotates through all major and minor specialties, including emergency medicine, internal medicine, obstetrics and gynecology, pediatrics, surgery, dermatology, ophthalmology, otorhinolaryngology, infectious diseases, and psychiatry.

== Iraq ==
In Iraq, graduates of a six-year medical program start a two-year internship in a hospital. The first year is divided into three months in specialties: internal medicine, obstetrics and gynecology, surgery, and pediatrics. In the second year, students must finish various-length courses in sub-specialties (radiology, ophthalmology, psychiatry, etc.). After the two-year internship, doctors may practice independently. At that point, they must practice in under-served areas for one year—after which they may apply to study a specialty. (This information is in accordance with the Graduation Law for Medical Professionals of the Iraqi Ministry of Health for 2019)

== Ireland ==
To register fully with the Medical Council of Ireland as a doctor, graduates must complete twelve months of training in an approved public hospital. Internship comprises at least one surgical and one medical rotation. Interns must spend at least two months and not more than three months in another speciality, including emergency medicine, general practice, obstetrics and gynaecology, paediatrics, psychiatry, anaesthesia, and radiology.

After completing the internship, doctors obtain a certificate of satisfactory service. On receipt of the certificate, the Medical Council permits the provisionally registered doctor to apply for full registration in the General Register of Medical Practitioners.

== Israel ==
In Israel, medical graduates must complete a one-year internship in an accredited hospital before they receive full registration. After completing the intern year, the graduate can go into a specialty program or practice general medicine. There are two kinds of internships:

- Direct internship is done in either internal medicine, pediatrics or surgery. Interns spend two months in surgery, two months in pediatrics, one month in emergency medicine, and six consecutive months (the second half of the year) in a chosen specialty.
- Rotating internship offers a schedule that rotates through all major specialties—including three months of internal medicine, two months of pediatrics, two months of surgery, one month of emergency medicine, one month of anesthesiology and intensive care, and two elective months.

In both programs, every intern gets a month off. Some applicants prefer the rotating program because it generally is not as strenuous as a straight internship. However, a straight year can provide better preparation for the second year of residency.

== Jordan ==
In Jordan, after finishing medical school (6 years), medical students receive an M.D. degree, but may only practice medicine after they work in a hospital for 12 months. After they complete the year of hospital work, they are licensed to work as a general practitioner.

== Lebanon ==
In Lebanon, universities like the American University of Beirut (AUB), the University of Balamand (UOB), or the Lebanese American University (LAU), follow a curriculum similar to that of universities in the US. The Beirut Arab University (BAU) on the other hand, follows a six-year program like in Europe, with an internship as a post graduate 7th year.

Other universities, like Universite Saint Joseph (USJ), follow the French curriculum. This excludes, for example, pre-medical studies (e.g., a BS in science). Instead, students enroll directly in a seven-year program of science and medicine.

== Malaysia ==
Every medical graduate, from a Malaysian public or private university, or from an overseas-approved university or college, must apply for provisional registration with the Malaysian Medical Council. Once the council approves their application, they are listed as 'Approved for Consideration'. This approval is required for them to apply for the position of Medical Graduate Officer (Pegawai Perubatan Siswazah) from the government, to be accepted into the government service.

Once the government accepts the application (through an interview and government servant compulsory course), the Council registers them as a Medical Graduate Officer with a Provisional Registration Number, which allows them to serve as house officers (called H.O. for short), also known as housemen, working in major government hospitals only (ones with adequate consultants of each specialty or department).

Interns must complete six four month rotations in:

- Internal medicine
- Surgery
- Paediatrics
- Orthopaedics,
- Obstetrics and Gynecology
- A choice of Emergency Medicine, Anaesthesiology, Psychiatry, Family Medicine;

This adds up to 24 months of housemanship. They are then “Fully Registered” by the Malaysian Medical Council. Government service is compulsory for every medical graduate who wants full registration with the Malaysian Medical Council—after which, they may practice independently.

Sometimes the council extends the 24-month housemanship due to incompetency or health reasons. A fully registered doctor (called medical officer, MO) may choose to work in the government sector or private sector. Consultants in this country, largely, refers to a doctor with completed specialty and sub-specialty training and a Master or PhD degree, approved by the council.

== Mexico ==
To become a physician in Mexico, one must study 12 years of elementary and high school before entering medical school. Medical education includes:

- Five years of medical school (10 semesters) that include basic sciences and clinical rotations
- One year of rotating internship to become gradually responsible to work without supervision. Clinical areas included: pediatrics, surgery, internal medicine, obstetrics and gynecology, emergency department, and community medicine.
- One year of social service, whether the medical school is private or public

After completing medical school, the medical student may obtain a license to work as a general physician and may opt to train in a specific field such as pediatrics, internal medicine, orthopedic surgery, etc. The doctor must complete a residency of three to seven years (depending on the field) to get a specialist license.

== Nepal ==
After four and half years of medical/dental school (degree of MBBS or BDS) every doctor in Nepal must complete a one-year compulsory rotatory internship in various specialities and pass a medical licensing examination conducted by the Nepal Medical Council (NMC) to get Temporary registration in Nepal Medical Council as a physician or dental surgeon. The internship should be completed through their medical/dental college, as recommended by the NMC. Only after registration with the NMC is one licensed to practice medicine or dentistry as a primary care doctor or dental surgeon. Those who study abroad are not allowed to do internship in Nepal, though it was done in past.

== The Netherlands ==
The Netherlands historically had a four-year pre-clinical phase leading to a master-equivalent pre-doctoral degree (doctorandus), followed by a two-year internship with responsibilities similar to a U.S. intern. The two-year training lead to an M.D. degree with license for independent practice on successful completion. With the introduction of the Bachelor/Master system as prescribed by the Bologna Process, the medical education curriculum has been modified in all eight medical schools to consist of a three-year bachelor and a three-year master program. The bachelor phase is almost exclusively pre-clinical. The master includes internships, skills training, refresher courses, and a research internship. The "master" is awarded with an M.D. degree.

== New Zealand ==
All graduates of New Zealand and Australian accredited medical schools undertake pre-vocational medical training, also known as the intern training programme. It is also undertaken by doctors who obtained registration based on a pass in the New Zealand Registration Examination (NZREX Clinical). During postgraduate year 1 (PGY1) and postgraduate year 2 (PGY2), house officers complete a series of 13-week clinical attachments as part of their pre-vocational medical training. From 2020, one of these attachments must be community-based.

== Nigeria ==
The internship program (housemanship) is a one-year period in most hospitals in Nigeria. After an internship program under the supervision of qualified licensed doctors each house officer must complete a one-year program in the National Youth Service Corp (NYSC). During this period, they must have a provisional license from the Medical and Dental Council of Nigeria to practice, temporarily with little or no supervision. The residency program is available to any medical doctor who wants to continue in their medical career. This involves writing a postgraduate examination termed "primaries" in any faculty of choice.

== Pakistan ==
After completing five years of medical school, each graduate must complete a year of training at a teaching hospital, rotating through various departments. After they complete this mandatory training period, a candidate may begin residency (specialty) training.

== Peru ==
In Peru, a medical intern is a seventh year medical student who must complete the specialties of internal medicine, obstetrics and gynecology, surgery, and pediatrics. Some universities include mental health in the seventh year curriculum. Some hospitals pay interns. Universidad Peruana Cayetano Heredia has an internship program and externship program—in which the latter acts as an apprentice of the former, thus the medical student has two years of medical practice. Universidad Peruana de Ciencias Aplicadas has an internship program and two years of externship program, thus the medical student has three years of medical practice.

== Philippines ==
After earning their Doctor of Medicine (M.D.) degree through a four-year post-baccalaureate program, medical graduates are required to complete one year of internship in authorized hospitals and health centers. The program is supervised and monitored by the Association of Philippine Medical Colleges (APMC), and its completion is a requirement for the Physician Licensure Examination (PLE).

== Poland ==
In Poland internship starts after six years of medical school. During thirteen months interns have to attend rotations in internal medicine and transfusiology, general and trauma surgery, intensive care, emergency medicine, pediatrics and neonatology, family medicine and at least one and at most three other specialties of their own choosing, additionally few courses: medical law, medical judicature, bioethics, public health, vaccinology, medical communication and prophylaxis of burnout, oncology prophylaxis, pain medicine and prophylaxis of HIV and diagnosis and treatment of AIDS. After finishing the internship and passing medical exam young doctors can start residency to earn chosen specialty or work as a doctor without specific medical specialty.

== Slovenia ==
In Slovenia, medical graduates, after six-years of medical school, must complete a six-month paid internship at a medical institution. During the internship, they rotate through internal medicine, surgery, pediatrics, OB/GYN, ENT, ophthalmology, emergency medicine, and anesthesiology—with emphasis on emergencies in each department. Completing the internship is a condition for taking the professional medical exam, passing which earns a doctor a license to practice medicine in Slovenia and apply for a specialty.

== South Africa ==
An internship is a compulsory requirement for newly qualified medical doctors who are registered with the Health Professions Council of South Africa in order to obtain a medical license to practice. They work in designated hospitals under supervision for two years. They may work independently in specified medical disciplines, and for periods of time designated by the HPCSA. They are employed by the institution they work at, and this option is generally only available to South African citizens or permanent residents. Foreign-qualified doctors who have recently qualified and do not have the required medical experience to register with the HPCSA may be told to do an internship to qualify for full registration. They may intern in their country of origin or in South Africa.

In South Africa, an elective for medical students is where a student arranges to visit a hospital for a short period (three to six months) to gain experience in a different medical context. They work under supervision, mentored by experienced doctors. It is primarily a learning experience. They cannot work independently, and must register with HPCSA if they are a foreign student.

== South Korea ==
1 year internship is obligation to enter 3-4 year residency. In South Korea, an intern can practice medicine without supervision as the medical law.

== Sweden ==
The Swedish equivalent to an internship is the allmäntjänstgöring (AT, "general practice"), which is required for obtaining a medical license. It takes at least 18 months, but usually lasts longer—21 months in most cases. Students must fulfill at least nine months in medicine and surgery (at least three months of each, but mostly six + six months), three months in psychiatry, and six months as a general practitioner. After the allmäntjänstgöring, the students must complete a test from the National Board of Health and Welfare (Socialstyrelsen), to receive a medical license. This is followed by specialisttjänstgöring (ST, "specialization practice"), the equivalent of residency.

== Thailand ==
After graduation from medical school, most newly qualified doctors are required to undertake a compulsory placement at a provincial hospital outside Bangkok (internship) for up to 3 years according to the Medical Council of Thailand (TMC). In the first year, internships are generally held at larger provincial hospitals, while second to third years are spent in smaller community hospitals. Upon completion of the first year, interns will receive a certificate of initial training (Thai:ใบรับรองการปฏิบัติงานแพทย์เพิ่มพูนทักษะ). The duration spent in internship depends on the specialty the graduate wishes to study.

== United Kingdom ==
The British equivalent of an intern is the foundation year 1 (F1, FY1) doctor, who is on the first year of their two-year Foundation Programme, and has provisional registration with the General Medical Council. Before the introduction of the Foundation Programme in 2005, the equivalent post was called a "house officer" (also known as junior house officer and latterly, pre-registration house officer or PRHO). Despite its technical obsolescence, many clinicians still use the term house officer. (The term "senior house officer" or SHO is still used to refer to a tier of doctors that may include both those in the second year of Foundation Programme, and those who have begun a specialty training programme). The Foundation Programme is a 2 year long training period in which competencies are developed and documented.

== United States ==
A medical or surgical internship typically lasts one year and usually begins on July 1. It is also referred to as "PGY-1" for "post-graduate year 1". The Accreditation Council for Graduate Medical Education (ACGME) officially dropped the term "intern" in 1975, instead referring to individuals in their first year of graduate medical education as "first year residents".

Internships are typically in three tracks: transitional, preliminary, and categorical. Transitional and preliminary internships are often undertaken at a separate hospital or institution before beginning a specialty-specific (or advanced) training program elsewhere, though they may be taken at the same location as an advanced residency. Preliminary internships are often specifically for advanced fields such as anesthesiology, dermatology, neurology, ophthalmology, physical medicine and rehabilitation, radiation oncology, and radiology (specialties requiring a preliminary year) or surgical residencies, though they can be utilized for other specialties such as anesthesiology. A transitional internship (often shortened to just "TY" for transitional year) is similar to the clinical years of medical school in that the intern rotates through a variety of medical services over the year such as neurology, general surgery, and pediatrics. After completion of a transitional year, the resident may go onto an advanced, specialty-specific program.

After a physician completes an internship and Step 3 of the United States Medical Licensing Examination or Level 3 of the COMLEX-USA, they may practice as a general practitioner, though they are not yet board certified. However, most physicians go on to complete a specialty track residency program over two to six years after their intern year, depending on the specialty. Specialty residencies that incorporate the internship year into the program and provide all training necessary for a particular specialty are known as categorical residencies.

== Venezuela ==
Venezuela has two internship types: a two-year postgraduate internship and a one-year compulsory pre graduation internship.

- The postgraduate internship is an elective two year postgraduate internship in type III or IV hospitals. It is required for obtaining a medical license (the other option is one-year in a rural location). The intern must complete for four month each of the specialties of internal medicine, obstetrics, surgery (general surgery and orthopedics surgery), and pediatrics. Also, there is a six months externship in a city setting outpatient clinic.
- Pre graduation internship: Venezuela mandates two types of medical studies for a medical degree. The program for a degree of "Médico cirujano" or "Médico Integral Comunitario" during the final year or one and a half year, depending on the university program, has a compulsory internship program under the supervision of qualified licensed doctors at a type III or IV hospital. During this time, students undergo basic hospital work. The intern must complete eight weeks each of the specialties of internal medicine, obstetrics and gynecology, general surgery, orthopedics, surgery, and pediatrics. There is also an eight-week externship in a rural outpatient clinic.

== See also ==
- Residency (medicine)
- Fellowship (medicine)
