= Egyptian Medical Licensing Examination =

Standardized test in Egypt

The Egyptian Medical Licensing Examination (Arabic: امتحان مزاولة الطب في مصر) (EMLE) is a standardized examination for graduates of medical schools in Egypt to obtain a license to practice medicine in Egypt.

== Exam system ==
According to Law No. 153 of 2019, the Ministry of Health is the authority entrusted with setting the controls and procedures for the national examination for licensing to practice medicine, under the supervision of the Compulsory Training Authority for Physicians. The exam is scheduled to be held twice during the months of February and September, through the exam's website, where students will be logged in to the exam by registering the user name and password, in addition to using the facial identification fingerprint to verify the student's identity during the specified period of time to complete the exam. A committee will be formed to set standards for the national exam to obtain a license to practice medicine, including consultants from the Ministry of Health and Population and professors from Egyptian universities and the Military Medical Academy.

== Exam conditions ==
- To take the exam, the candidate must have completed the academic requirements for a Bachelor's degree in Medicine and Surgery either in Egypt or abroad:
1. Candidates who sit for the exam and who have completed their education requirements from an Egyptian educational institution recognized by the Supreme Council of Universities must have completed the compulsory internship period of minimum 2 years.
2. Candidates sitting for the exam who have completed their education requirements from a non-Egyptian educational institution must submit the relevant documents to prove that their educational institution is recognized by the Supreme Council of Universities.
