= National Postgraduate Medical College of Nigeria =

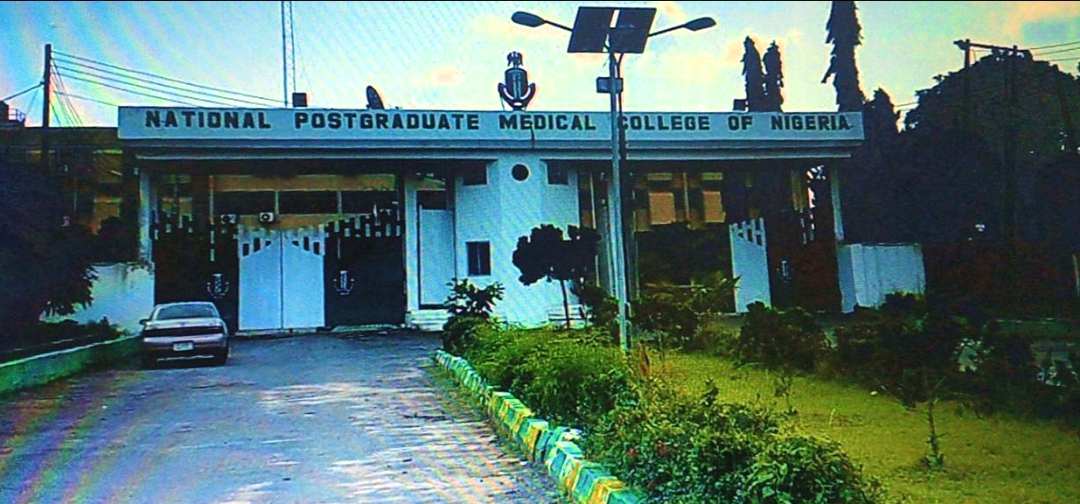
- Formation: 24 September 1979
- Headquarters: Ijanikin, Lagos, Nigeria
- President: Prof Peter Ndidi Ebeigbe
- Website: npmcn.edu.ng

The National Postgraduate Medical College of Nigeria is a parastatal of the Federal Government Ministry of Health, charged with the responsibility of postgraduate training of medical and dental doctors in Nigeria.

== History ==
It was established on September 24, 1979, under the National Postgraduate Medical College decree No. 67 now Cap N59 Laws of the Federation 2004. It is a tertiary institution at the apex of medical education in Nigeria, producing medical, surgical, and dental specialists/subspecialists who are capable of providing world-class research, teaching and healthcare.

== Professional examinations ==
The college organizes the mandatory part 1 and the part 2 (final) fellowship examinations for medical and dental doctors in residency training, as well as the entrance primary fellowship examinations into several faculties. Success in the part 2 examination leads to the award of the Fellow of the Medical College (FMC). The examinations are written twice in a year across the country. Diploma programmes are also run in select faculties, while revision courses are conducted for trainees in all faculties annually. The college administers the Nigerian Postgraduate Medical Journal, a MEDLINE-indexed journal published quarterly. On September 14, 2015, the college faulted and objected the dissolution of the Medical and Dental Council of Nigeria by Muhammadu Buhari, the then president of Nigeria. It insinuated that such premature dissolution of the council will encourage quackery and malpractice in the health sector.

The body has been under scrutiny lately for its poor recognition around the world, for its poorly updated medical education compared to other countries, and for the limited acceptance of its fellowship qualification in parts of the world. Meanwhile, such narratives are beginning to change since the recent introduction of the British model of postgraduate Doctor of Medicine (MD) in Clinical Sciences. The MD, an optional qualification equivalent to the PhD, is statutorily a pre-part 2 (fellowship) degree.

== Faculties ==
The college consists of sixteen faculties, including:

- Faculty of Anaesthesia
- Faculty of Dental Surgery
- Faculty of Family Medicine
- Faculty of Family Dentistry
- Faculty of Internal Medicine
- Faculty of Obstetrics and Gynaecology
- Faculty of Ophthalmology
- Faculty of Orthopaedics
- Faculty of Otorhinolaryngology Head & Neck Surgery
- Faculty of Paediatrics
- Faculty of Pathology
- Faculty of Psychiatry
- Faculty of Public Health and Community Medicine
- Faculty of Radiology
- Faculty of Surgery
- Faculty of Emergency Medicine

== College leadership ==
The college has recently announced Prof. Peter Ebeigbe, a professor of Obstetrics and Gynaecology at Delta State University, Abraka as the new president of the college with the investiture ceremony billed to hold on 1 March 2024.
