= Federal Medical Centre, Azare =

Hospital in Bauchi, Nigeria

Federal Medical Centre (FMC) Azare
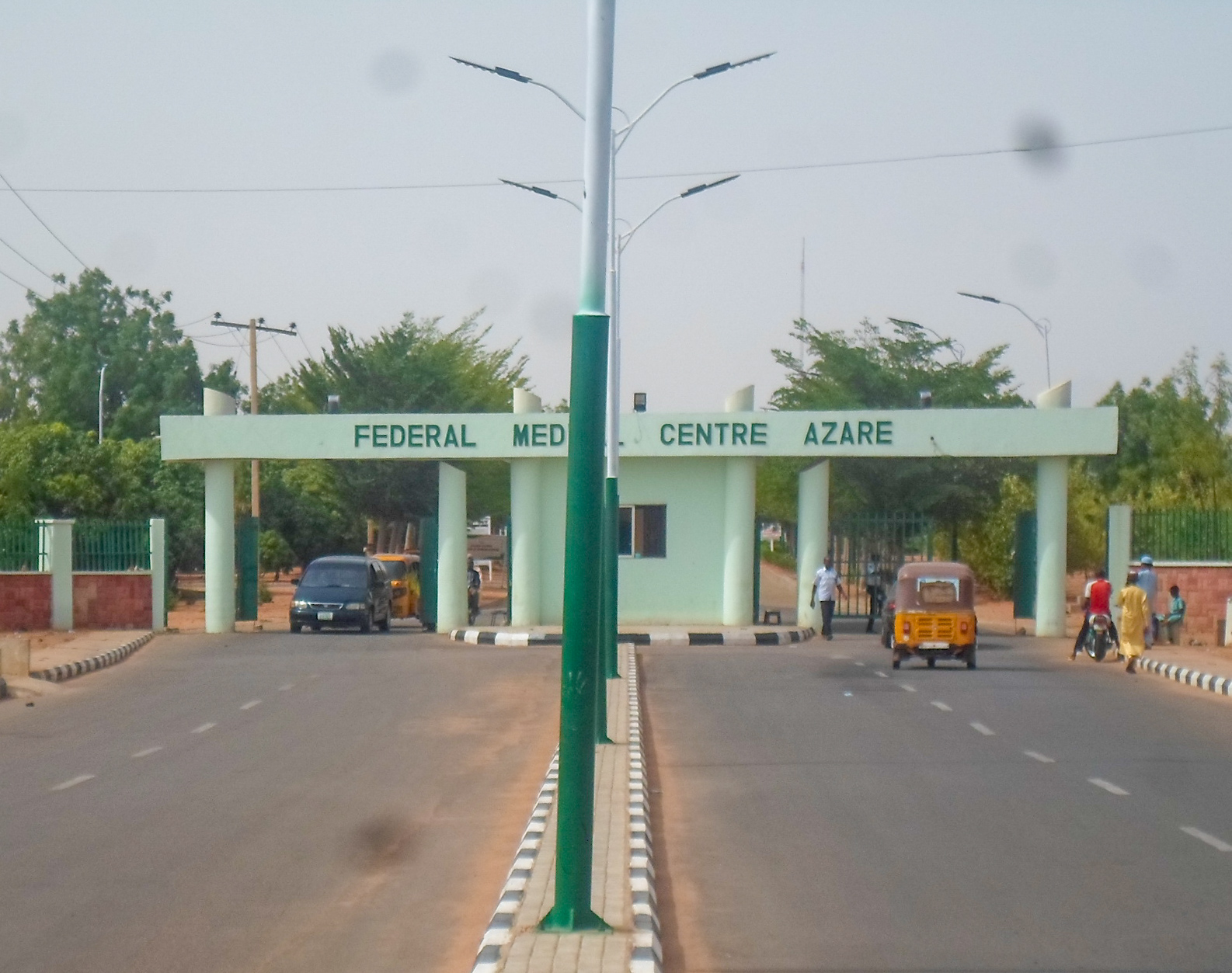
- Federal Medical Centre, Azare, main entry gate

Geography
- Location: Azare, Katagum, Bauchi State, Nigeria, Nigeria
- Coordinates: 11.6744°N 10.1991°E

Organisation
- Care system: Public
- Type: General, reaching, research

Services
- Emergency department: Yes

History
- Founded: 2001

Links
- Website: fmcazare.gov.ng
- Lists: Hospitals in Nigeria

Federal Medical Centre, Azare, is a medical centre owned by the Federal Government of Nigeria. It is located along Amb. Ahmed Abdullah Road in Azare, Katagum, Bauchi State, Nigeria. The center was opened to commence operation in 2001. The medical centre is an agency under the federal ministry of health. It marked its 20th anniversary on March 17, 2022.

== Accreditation ==
Federal Medical Center was accredited by WACS and NOUN.
