= House officer =

House officer (previously often called a houseman) may refer to:

- Foundation house officer, a doctor in the first two years after qualification in a British hospital, introduced in 2005
- Pre-registration house officer, a British hospital doctor in the first year after qualification, phased out in 2005
- Senior house officer, a British hospital doctor in the second and third years after qualification, phased out in 2005
- A physician undergoing residency training in a hospital
