= Nigerian Medical Association =

Professional association for registered Nigerian doctors and dentists

The Nigerian Medical Association (NMA) is the professional association of Nigerian medical doctors. The NMA has more than 35,000 members from 36 state branches and Abuja, including those registered in the diaspora. The NMA was established in 1951 and has its headquarters in Abuja, and over 30 state branch offices throughout Nigeria. NMA's membership spans all six major specialties of internal medicine, surgery, obstetrics and gynaecology, paediatrics, public health and laboratory medicine/pathology.

The incumbent president of the NMA is Prof. Afekhide Ernest Omoti., a Professor of Ophthalmology at the University of Benin.

== Distribution of members ==
According to experts, about 45% of Nigerian doctors practice in urban areas where only 55% of the population lives. This creates an unbalanced doctor-patient ratio, which is one of the challenges of the Nigerian health system that the association and the federal government are trying to address.

== Governance ==
The National Executive Council (NEC) is the governing body of the NMA and has full powers to act on its behalf in the period between the Annual Delegates' Meetings and also make policy decisions.

== See also ==
- Healthcare in Nigeria
