= Health in Nigeria =

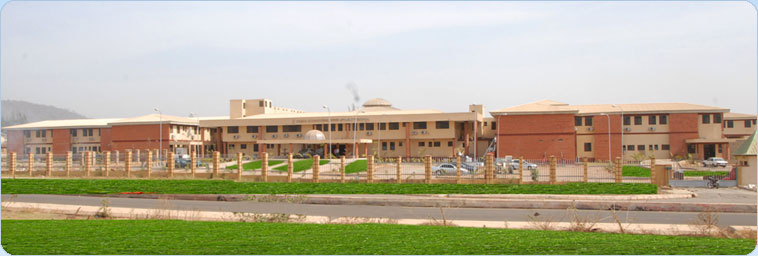
A hospital in Abuja, Nigeria's capital

In Nigeria, significant progress has been made in health improvement since 1950. However, lower respiratory infections, neonatal disorders, and HIV/AIDS remain the leading causes of death in the country. Diseases such as monkeypox, polio, malaria, and tuberculosis have shown improvement due to various interventions. Other major health concerns include malnutrition, pollution, and road traffic accidents. In 2020, Nigeria recorded the highest number of cases of COVID-19 in Africa.

The Human Rights Measurement Initiative (HRMI) estimates that Nigeria fulfills 48.2% of the expected obligations for the right to health, based on its income. For children's health, Nigeria achieves 66.6% of what is expected, while for adults, the figure is 61.7%. Reproductive health performance is particularly low, at 16.3% of the expected level.

== Life expectancy and under-five mortality rate ==
Life expectancy at birth in Nigeria increased from 49.4 years in 2007 to approximately 54 years in 2017. The under-five mortality rate (U5MR) per 1,000 live births decreased from 145.7 in 2007 to 100.2 in 2017. When compared with other countries and global averages, Nigeria's health indicators remain poor.

Life expectancy at birth in Nigeria

Top 10 causes of death in Nigeria (2007–2017)

Top 10 causes of death in Nigeria
| Cause of death | IHME rank 2007 | IHME rank 2017 | Percentage change (2007–2017) |
|---|---|---|---|
| Malaria | 1 | 4 | -35.8 |
| Diarrheal disease | 2 | 5 | -39.5 |
| HIV/AIDS | 3 | 3 | -25.7 |
| Lower respiratory infection | 4 | 1 | -10.7 |
| Neonatal disorders | 5 | 2 | -1.5 |
| Tuberculosis | 6 | 6 | -15.2 |
| Meningitis | 7 | 7 | -2.0 |
| Cirrhosis | 8 | 10 | +1.3 |
| Ischemic heart disease | 9 | 8 | +24.5 |
| Stroke | 10 | 9 | +15.0 |

Source: Institute for Health Metrics and Evaluation (IHME)

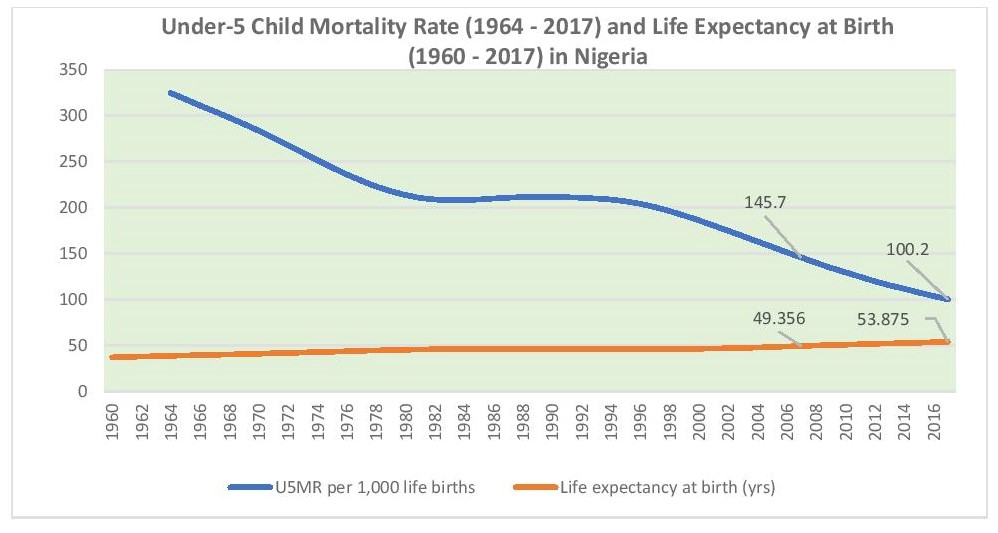

Source: Under-5 Mortality Rate (per 1,000 live births) and Life Expectancy at Birth (years). Estimates developed by the UN Inter-agency Group for Child Mortality Estimation (UNICEF, WHO, World Bank, UN DESA Population Division).

Comparison of health indicators in Nigeria and reference countries/regions

Comparison of health indicators
| Country/Region | Life expectancy at birth (2007) | Life expectancy at birth (2017) | U5MR (2007) | U5MR (2017) | Estimated population (2018) | |
|---|---|---|---|---|---|---|
| Nigeria | 49 | 54 | 146 | 100 | 195 million+ | |
| Reference countries | Ghana | 60 | 63 | 82 | 49 | 29 million+ |
| Malawi | 53 | 64 | 103 | 55 | 18 million+ | |
| Rwanda | 59 | 67 | 88 | 38 | 13 million+ | |
| Sudan | 61 | 67 | 84 | 63 | 41 million+ | |
| Norway | 80 | 83 | 4 | 3 | 5 million+ | |
| United States | 78 | 79 | 8 | 7 | 327 million+ | |
| China | 75 | 76 | 20 | 9 | 1.393 billion | |
| Australia | 81 | 82 | 5 | 4 | 24 million | |
| Reference regions & world | East Asia & Pacific | 74 | 76 | 26 | 16 | 2.328 billion |
| Europe & Central Asia | 75 | 78 | 15 | 9 | 918 million+ | |
| Latin America & the Caribbean | 73 | 76 | 24 | 18 | 641 million+ | |
| Middle East & North Africa | 72 | 74 | 31 | 23 | 448 million+ | |
| South Asia | 66 | 69 | 71 | 45 | 1.814 billion | |
| Sub-Saharan Africa | 55 | 61 | 116 | 76 | 1.078 billion | |
| World | 70 | 72 | 58 | 39 | 7.594 billion | |

Source: United Nations Population Division, World Population Prospects: 2017 Revision; The World Bank Group.

== Maternal mortality ==
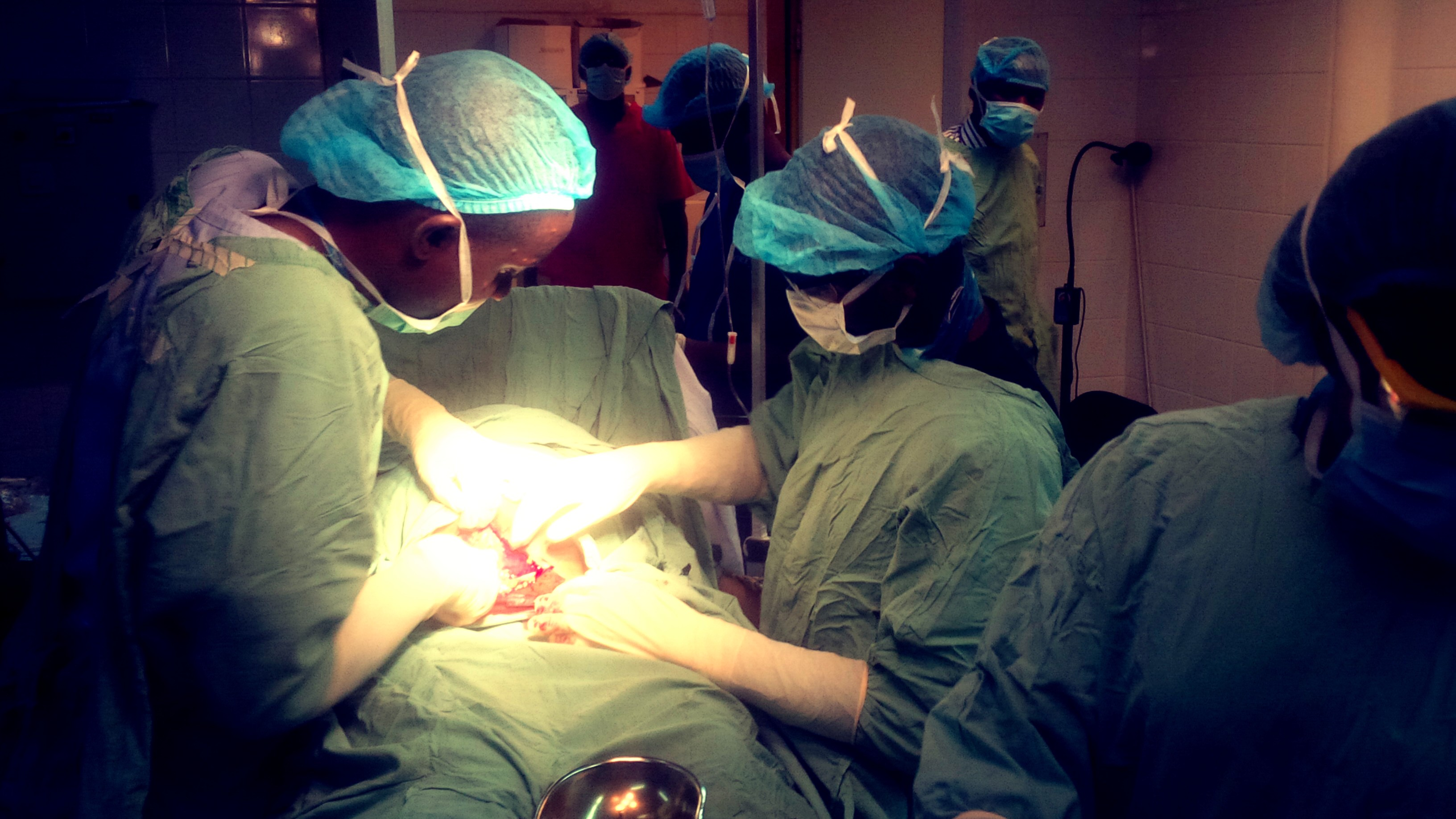
Successful emergency Caesarean section performed in Nigeria

The maternal mortality rate in Nigeria is over 800 per 100,000 live births. In 2013, the rate was recorded at 560 deaths per 100,000 live births, slightly higher than the 516 deaths per 100,000 live births reported in 1980. Contributing factors include inadequate healthcare infrastructure, limited access to quality medical services, malnutrition linked to poverty, displacement due to Boko Haram insurgency, unsafe abortions, and harmful traditional practices such as female genital mutilation.

In Nigeria, the lifetime risk of death for pregnant women is 1 in 22. The country has restrictive abortion laws, limiting access to safe procedures and increasing risks associated with unsafe abortions. A 2019 study highlighted insufficient skills in emergency obstetric care among healthcare providers. Regional disparities also exist, with maternal mortality declining in southern Nigeria but remaining high in the north due to lower educational levels and access to services.

Maternal mortality impacts Nigeria's socioeconomic development. Sustainable Development Goal 3, target 1, aims to reduce the maternal mortality ratio to below 70 per 100,000 live births by 2030. Achieving this goal requires awareness campaigns, improved healthcare access, and accountability from government and local leaders.

== Water supply and sanitation ==
Access to improved water sources in Nigeria increased from 47% in 1990 to 54% in 2010. Urban access, which had decreased from 80% to 65% in 2006, recovered to 74% by 2010.

Sanitation infrastructure remains inadequate. Most households rely on septic tanks as centralized sewage systems are limited to Abuja and parts of Lagos. A 2006 study revealed that only 1% of Lagos households were connected to sewer systems. In 2016, unsafe water, poor sanitation, and hygiene accounted for 68.6 deaths per 100,000 people.

== Disease ==
=== HIV/AIDS ===
The 2018 Nigeria HIV/AIDS Indicator and Impact Survey revealed that the national HIV prevalence rate among adults aged 15–49 is 1.4%. Prevalence varies significantly across regions and states. Akwa Ibom State has the highest prevalence at 5.6%, followed by Benue State (4.9%) and Rivers State (3.8%). In contrast, Jigawa State and Katsina State have the lowest prevalence at 0.3%.

The epidemic is primarily driven by high-risk behaviors such as multiple sexual partnerships, low risk perception, limited access to healthcare, and certain socioeconomic factors, including street hawking near military and police checkpoints. Other contributing factors include prostitution, high rates of sexually transmitted infections, clandestine high-risk sexual practices, and human trafficking. Young women are particularly vulnerable compared to young men.

=== Malaria ===
Malaria, a mosquito-borne disease, remains a leading cause of morbidity and mortality in Nigeria. While there has been a slight decline in transmission and deaths since 2007, it remains the top cause of death in the country. As of 2012, the malaria prevalence rate was 11%. The President's Malaria Initiative identifies Nigeria as a high-burden country. The National Malaria Control Program has adopted the global campaign theme, "End Malaria for Good."

In 2017, malaria ranked as the fourth leading cause of death in Nigeria, with under-five mortality and infant mortality rates of 103.2 and 62.6 deaths per 1,000 live births, respectively. High transmission persists in various states, compounded by challenges such as drug and insecticide resistance and the socioeconomic costs of eradication efforts. Effective mosquito control, accurate diagnosis, and treatment are critical to tackling the disease. Strong leadership, transparency, and accountability at all levels of government are necessary to ensure success in malaria control and eradication efforts.

=== Endemic diseases ===
In 1985, an outbreak of yellow fever in Nigeria resulted in the deaths of over 1,000 people. The epidemic spread over five years, causing further fatalities. The yellow fever vaccine has been available since the 1930s. Other endemic diseases in Nigeria include malaria, hepatitis A, hepatitis B, typhoid, meningitis, and Lassa fever. Travelers to Nigeria are generally advised to get vaccines and medicines to protect against these diseases.

=== Mpox ===
Mpox which is also called monkeypox is a common diseases among animals that has been transmitted from animals to human beings. It can also spread from someone that has contracted the disease to another human. Mpox occurs when there is contact with an infected animal or infected humans or contaminated materials. Mpox doesn't have a specific treatment. We can only prevent it by cleaning our hands regularly by washing and we make sure cook animals meat thoroughly. The diseas was first discovered in 1971 in Nigeria with two cases

=== COVID-19 ===
Nigeria's response to the COVID-19 pandemic included a range of measures aimed at controlling the spread of the virus, including lockdowns, travel restrictions, and increased testing. The government also collaborated with international organizations such as the World Health Organization (WHO) and the African Union to secure vaccines. Despite these efforts, Nigeria faced challenges in terms of vaccine distribution and public health infrastructure. The pandemic exacerbated existing health issues, putting a strain on the country's already limited resources.

=== Neglected tropical diseases ===
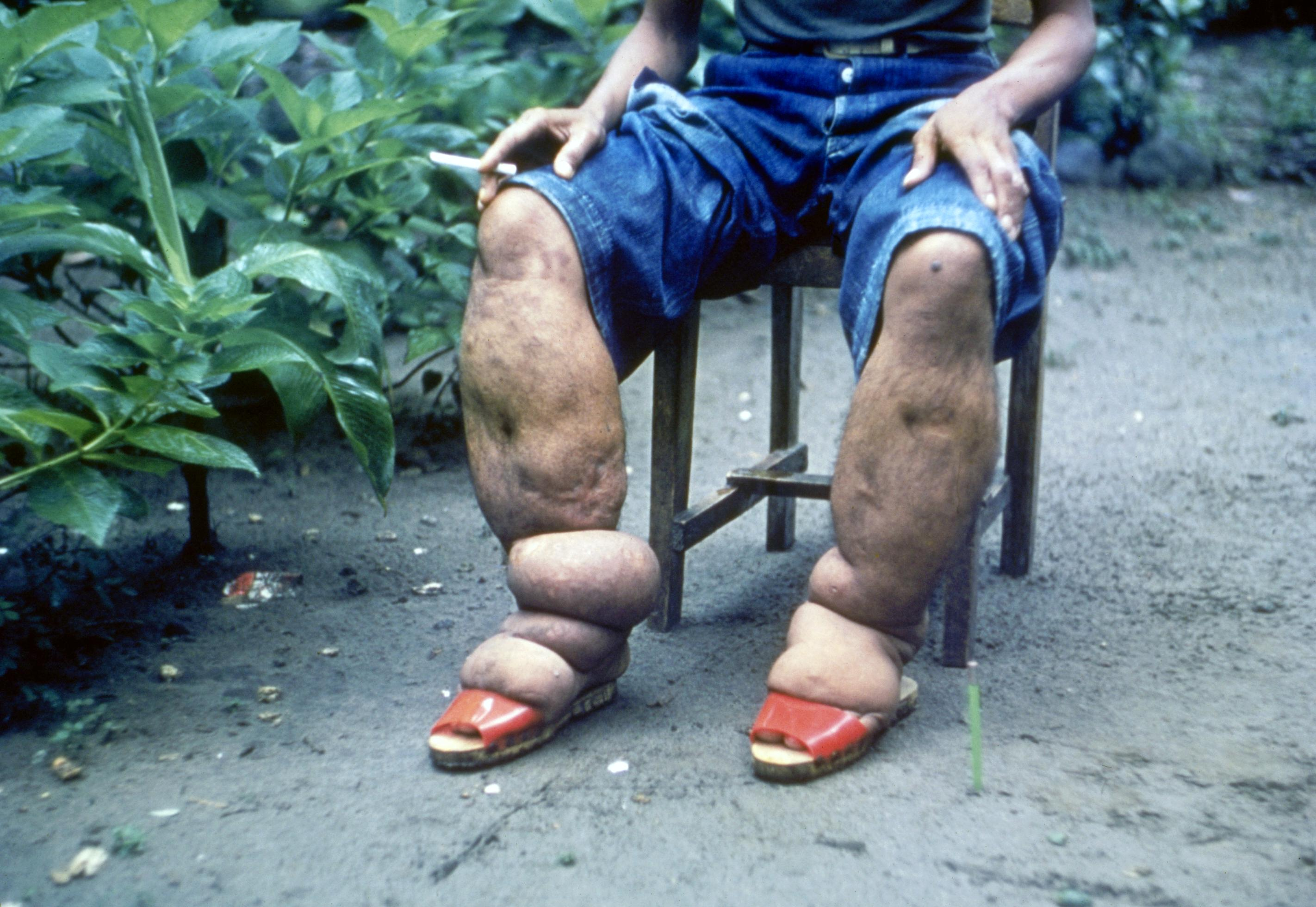
Elephantiasis

Neglected tropical diseases are a diverse group of infectious diseases caused by various pathogens, including viruses, bacteria, parasites, fungi, and toxins. These diseases disproportionately affect impoverished communities, particularly in tropical and subtropical regions. In Nigeria, neglected tropical diseases are a significant public health concern due to their widespread prevalence and socio economic impact.

Nigeria has one of the highest burdens of neglected tropical diseases in Africa. The epidemiology of these diseases in the country is influenced by environmental conditions, poverty, inadequate healthcare infrastructure, and a high reliance on subsistence agriculture. Many neglected tropical diseases in Nigeria are vector borne, have animal reservoirs, and exhibit complex life cycles, which pose significant challenges for public health interventions.

These diseases include:

- Lymphatic filariasis: Also known as elephantiasis, is a parasitic disease caused by worms such as Wuchereria bancrofti, Brugia malayi, and Brugia timori. It is transmitted through mosquito bites from species like Anopheles, Culex, Aedes, and Mansonia. The infection affects the lymphatic system, leading to severe swelling (lymphedema) in the limbs, genitals, and breasts. Over time, the skin thickens, and the affected areas become painful, making movement difficult. The disease can result in significant complications, including disability, secondary infections, and psychological distress. Many individuals suffering from lymphatic filariasis face social stigma due to their appearance, which can impact their mental health and quality of life. In severe cases, the condition limits mobility and daily activities, contributing to long-term physical and emotional suffering.
- Onchocerciasis, commonly known as river blindness, is caused by Onchocerca volvulus, a parasitic worm transmitted through the bites of infected blackflies (Simulium species). These blackflies breed in fast-flowing rivers, making communities near such areas particularly vulnerable. Once inside the human body, the worms produce microfilariae, which migrate through the skin and eyes, leading to severe health issues. The symptoms of onchocerciasis include intense itching, skin rashes, and depigmentation, often referred to as "leopard skin." Infected individuals may also develop nodules under the skin where adult worms reside. Over time, the disease can cause vision impairment, eventually leading to irreversible blindness. Beyond physical suffering, the disease creates social and economic burdens, as affected individuals may struggle with daily activities and employment. Prevention and treatment of onchocerciasis primarily involve the administration of ivermectin, which kills the microfilariae and helps control the disease's progression. Additionally, efforts to reduce the blackfly population through vector control methods, such as insecticide spraying, play a crucial role in minimizing transmission. Continuous treatment and preventive measures are essential to reducing the impact of this debilitating disease, particularly in endemic regions.
- Schistosomiasis, also known as bilharzia, is a parasitic disease caused by various species of Schistosoma, including S. mansoni, S. haematobium, and S. japonicum. The infection occurs when individuals come into contact with freshwater contaminated by infected snails that release parasitic larvae. Once inside the body, the parasites mature and migrate to different organs, leading to symptoms such as blood in urine (urinary schistosomiasis), diarrhea, liver damage, and in severe cases, kidney failure. If left untreated, schistosomiasis can cause serious complications, including bladder cancer, liver fibrosis, anemia, and growth retardation in children. Preventing schistosomiasis involves avoiding contact with contaminated water sources and implementing snail control measures to reduce the spread of infection. Mass drug administration with praziquantel is an effective treatment strategy to eliminate the parasites and prevent long-term complications. Public health efforts focus on improving water sanitation, educating at-risk communities, and promoting early diagnosis and treatment to minimize the disease's impact. Through sustained preventive measures and treatment programs, schistosomiasis can be effectively controlled and its burden significantly reduced.

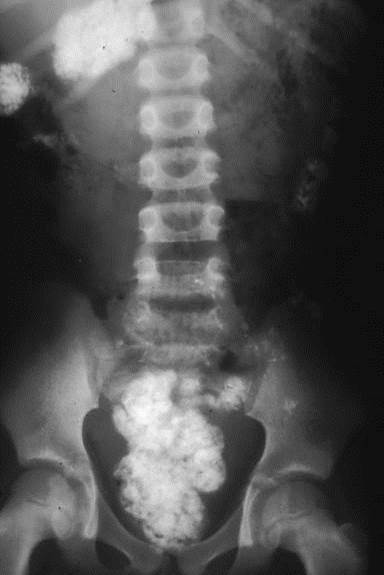
Ascaris infection in X-ray image- Pica, the practice of eating soil (South Africa) (16424840111)

- Soil-transmitted helminths, including roundworms (Ascaris lumbricoides), hookworms (Necator americanus, Ancylostoma duodenale), and whipworms (Trichuris trichiura), are parasitic worms that infect humans through contaminated food, water, or direct contact with infected soil. These parasites cause significant health issues such as malnutrition, stunted growth, anemia, abdominal pain, and diarrhea. In children, chronic infections can lead to cognitive impairment and reduced school performance, further impacting their development. The transmission of these worms is primarily linked to poor sanitation and hygiene practices, making them prevalent in regions with inadequate access to clean water and proper waste disposal. Preventing soil transmitted helminth infections requires a combination of improved sanitation, hygiene education, and mass deworming programs. Promoting proper handwashing, wearing protective footwear, and ensuring access to clean water can significantly reduce infection rates. Deworming treatments, such as albendazole and mebendazole, are widely used in public health initiatives to control and eliminate infections, especially among school-aged children. Addressing these parasitic infections is crucial for improving overall health, enhancing educational outcomes, and breaking the cycle of poverty in affected communities.

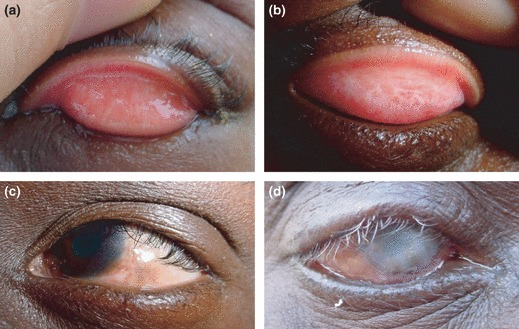
Trachoma 1

- Trachoma is an infectious eye disease caused by the bacterium Chlamydia trachomatis. It spreads through direct contact with eye discharge from infected individuals or via flies acting as vectors. The infection initially causes redness, irritation, and pus discharge in the eyes. If left untreated, repeated infections lead to trichiasis, a condition where the eyelashes turn inward and scrape against the cornea, resulting in scarring. Severe cases can cause irreversible blindness, making trachoma a leading cause of preventable blindness worldwide. Preventing and treating trachoma involves the SAFE strategy, Surgery to correct trichiasis, Antibiotics like azithromycin to eliminate the infection, Facial cleanliness to reduce transmission, and Environmental improvements such as better sanitation and reduced fly breeding. Public health initiatives targeting hygiene and access to clean water play a crucial role in reducing the disease's prevalence. With sustained efforts, trachoma can be eliminated as a public health concern in affected regions.
- Leprosy, also known as Hansen's disease, is a chronic infectious disease caused by Mycobacterium leprae, a slow growing bacterium that primarily affects the skin, nerves, and mucous membranes. It is transmitted through prolonged close contact with an infected person, typically via nasal droplets. The disease manifests through symptoms such as skin lesions, loss of sensation, nerve damage, and muscle weakness. If left untreated, leprosy can lead to severe complications, including deformities, permanent disabilities, and social discrimination due to misconceptions surrounding the disease. Despite its historical stigma, leprosy is a curable disease, and early detection plays a crucial role in preventing long-term complications. The World Health Organization (WHO) recommends multidrug therapy using a combination of rifampicin, dapsone, and clofazimine, which effectively eliminates the bacteria and stops transmission. Raising awareness, improving access to healthcare, and reducing social stigma are essential steps in eradicating leprosy and ensuring that affected individuals receive timely and effective treatment.

==== Challenges ====
- Inadequate funding: One of the major challenges in controlling Neglected tropical diseases in Nigeria is funding. The financial resources allocated to Neglected tropical diseases programs are often insufficient to sustain long-term intervention efforts. Many initiatives rely heavily on international donors, and when funding is inconsistent or insufficient, essential programs such as mass drug administration, vector control, and surveillance suffer setbacks. Without adequate investment in research, treatment, and preventive measures, progress toward eliminating these diseases remains slow, and affected communities continue to suffer.
- Weak healthcare infrastructure: Nigeria's healthcare system, particularly in rural and underserved areas, faces significant challenges in providing adequate services for control of neglected tropical diseases. Many communities lack well equipped health facilities, trained personnel, and essential medical supplies, making it difficult for individuals to receive timely diagnosis and treatment. In some regions, healthcare centers are located far from affected populations, further complicating access to necessary interventions. This weak infrastructure limits the effectiveness of disease monitoring, early detection, and management efforts, allowing neglected tropical diseases to persist and spread.
- Resistance and re-infection: The control of neglected tropical diseases is complicated by the challenges of parasite resistance and re infection. Many neglected tropical diseases, such as schistosomiasis and lymphatic filariasis, have complex transmission cycles that make complete eradication difficult. Environmental factors, including poor sanitation and inadequate waste management, contribute to ongoing transmission. Even after treatment, individuals living in high risk areas are often exposed to the same conditions that led to infection in the first place, increasing the likelihood of re-infection. In some cases, drug resistance develops, making treatment less effective and necessitating the development of new therapeutic strategies.
- Limited community engagement: Effective control of neglected tropical diseases requires participation from local communities, but sociocultural beliefs and a lack of awareness hinder engagement efforts. In some areas, misconceptions about disease causes and treatments lead to resistance against medical interventions. For example, traditional beliefs may attribute neglected tropical diseases to supernatural causes rather than environmental or biological factors, leading individuals to seek alternative treatments instead of medical care. Additionally, some communities are unaware of available healthcare services or fear stigmatization, which prevents them from seeking treatment. Enhancing health education and involving community leaders in awareness campaigns are crucial steps toward overcoming these barriers.

=== Opioid addiction ===
In 2024, opioids were the leading cause of fatal drug overdose in Nigeria. In 2024, opioids such as tramadol and codeine were widely available in Nigeria. Other opiates available include pentazocine and morphine. Opiate use is widespread, in both urban and rural areas. In some communities, opioid use is normalised, and seen as a non-stigmatised way to address personal stress.

In 2024, there were few treatment centres available. Law enforcement action has focused upon the criminalisation of drug use, rather than interdicting supply of the drugs.

== Food ==
Nutrition, especially in northern Nigeria, is often inadequate. Since 2002, food staples have been required to be fortified with nutrients such as vitamin A, folic acid, zinc, iodine, and iron. However, some Nigerian industries have opposed this, citing reduced profit margins. The Bill & Melinda Gates Foundation is contributing $5 million over four years to enforce a rigorous testing regime to ensure the standards are met. The initiative aims to provide critical nutrients to children, particularly those who consume mainly cereal and beans, at low cost. This would help reduce the risk of stunting and death from diseases like measles and diarrhea. Nearly half of child deaths under five are attributed to malnutrition. Additionally, Aliko Dangote, whose companies supply salt, sugar, and flour, has called for a crackdown on the importation of low-quality food products, often smuggled into local markets.

=== Pollution ===
Traffic congestion in Lagos, environmental pollution—including water pollution, air pollution, and noise pollution—are major health issues.

==== Water ====
Aquatic systems in Nigeria are reservoirs for toxic chemicals. Activities in the oil and gas industries, along with the widespread discharge of effluents into waterways, have caused significant environmental damage. Toxic substances such as polyaromatic hydrocarbons, per- and polyfluoroalkyl substances, and heavy metals contaminate oceans, rivers, and streams.

In 2018, The Nation newspaper reported on improper waste disposal in the country, noting the lack of a proper waste management system, which leads to indiscriminate dumping of refuse, used polythene bags, plastic bottles, and other waste materials in the environment. The Huffington Post in May 2017 raised an alarm about the pervasive dumping of plastics in the ocean, stating that "the oceans are drowning in plastics – and no one is paying attention to the menace." The Ellen MacArthur Foundation, in partnership with the World Economic Forum, predicted that by 2050, plastic in the oceans will outweigh fish. This surge in consumption is expected to increase the negative externalities associated with plastics. Many waste materials contain estrogenic and androgenic chemicals, which can leach into the environment, affecting the ecosystem and potentially disrupting hormonal functions. These contaminants are toxic to aquatic life, affecting their lifespan and reproductive capabilities, and they bioaccumulate up the food chain.

==== Air ====
Nigeria has some of the worst air quality in the world (ranked 4th globally), with four major cities—Onitsha, Aba, Kaduna, and Umuahia—ranking among the most polluted cities due to particulate matter (PM10). A recent WHO report found Nigeria's annual mean PM2.5 concentration at 72 μg/m^{3}, well above the recommended limit of 10 μg/m^{3}. According to the World Health data report, air pollution is a leading cause of death and disability in Nigeria, contributing to chronic respiratory diseases, cardiovascular diseases, and communicable diseases. Environmental risks, including indoor air pollution and ambient air pollution, account for significant morbidity and mortality in the country.

Table showing the proportion of deaths attributed to air pollution in Nigeria (2019) for all ages and sexes
| Disease/disorder | Air pollution attributable share of total death in percentages |
|---|---|
| Ischemic heart disease | 4.37 |
| Stroke | 3.98 |
| Lung cancer | 0.39 |
| Chronic obstructive pulmonary disease | 0.89 |

Table showing the proportion of DALYs attributed to air pollution in Nigeria (2019) for all ages and sexes
| Disease/disorder | Air pollution attributable share of total DALYs in percentages |
|---|---|
| Ischemic heart disease | 1.3 |
| Stroke | 1.47 |
| Lung cancer | 0.13 |
| Chronic obstructive pulmonary disease | 0.41 |

==== Causes ====
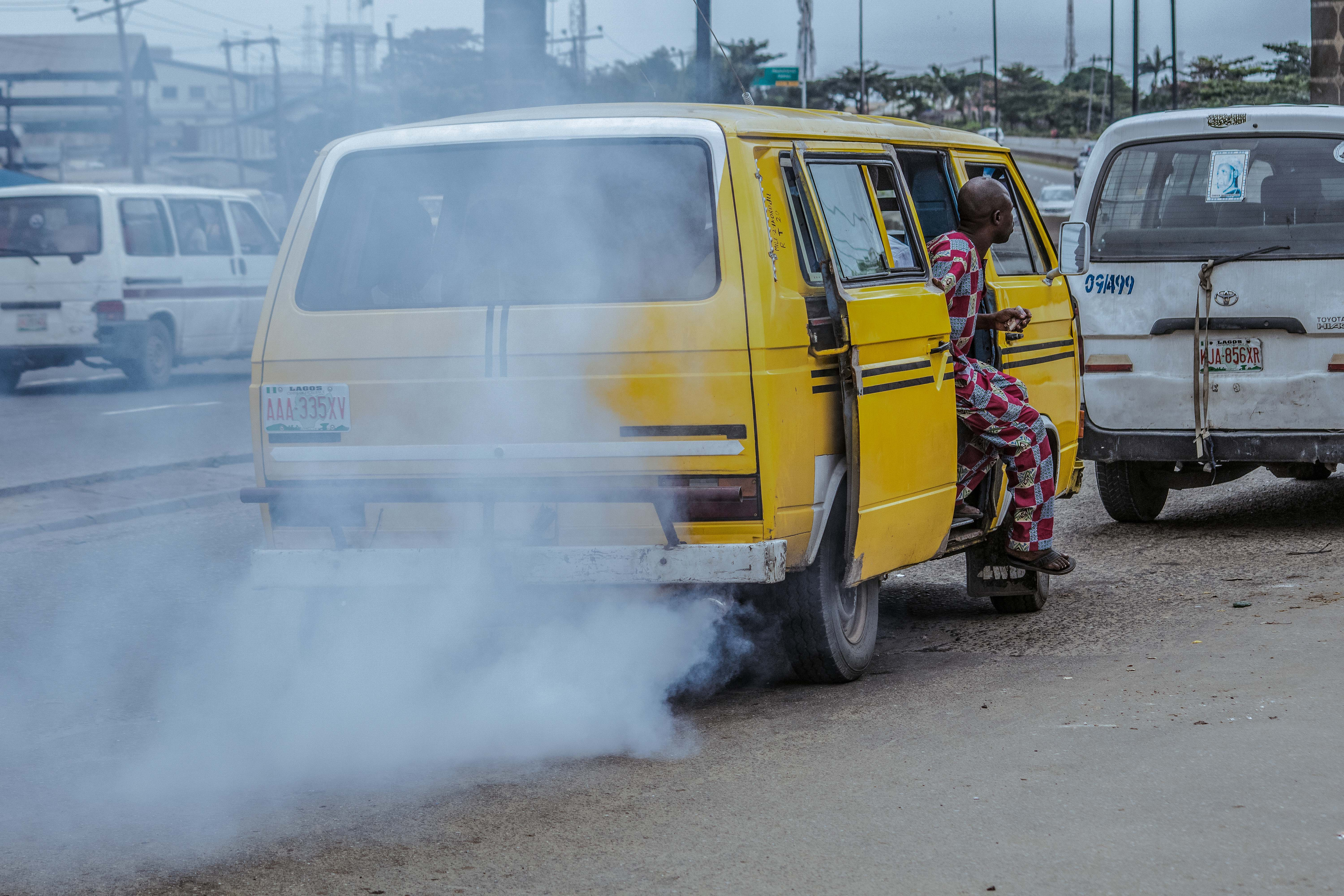
A yellow Danfo bus causing air pollution in Lagos State, Nigeria

Nigeria is home to many automobiles, including cars, motorbikes, and heavy-duty vehicles such as buses and lorries, many of which are old and inefficient in terms of energy consumption. These vehicles emit harmful fumes, including nitrogen oxides, sulfur oxides, carbon dioxide, carbon monoxide, particulate matter, and others. A significant amount of waste across the country, both household and industrial, is disposed of by combustion, releasing fumes from organic materials, synthetic materials such as plastic and rubber, and hazardous items like batteries and e-waste. Many households also contribute to air pollution through the use of inefficient kerosene stoves, firewood, and charcoal for cooking, often indoors with poor ventilation. Additionally, many offices and residences contribute to air pollution by using generators as substitutes for unreliable public power supply, with fumes released in poorly ventilated areas. Other major sources of pollution include emissions from factories and industries, which release similar fumes as automobiles, but primarily use diesel instead of gasoline.

== Road traffic accidents ==
Every year, 1.25 million people die in road traffic crashes. Between 20 and 50 million more people suffer non-fatal injuries, many of which lead to permanent disabilities. Road traffic injuries cause significant economic losses for individuals, their families, and countries, due to treatment costs and lost productivity from those killed or disabled, as well as for family members who need to take time off work or school to care for the injured. Road traffic crashes cost many countries about 3% of their gross domestic product. Road traffic injuries are the leading cause of death among people aged 15 to 29 years.

Over 3,400 people die on the world's roads every day, and tens of millions are injured or disabled annually. Children, pedestrians, cyclists, and older individuals are particularly vulnerable. The World Health Organization (WHO) collaborates with governmental and non-governmental partners globally to highlight the preventability of road traffic injuries and to promote practices that address key behavioral risk factors, including speed, drink-driving, motorcycle helmet use, seat-belts, and child restraints.

Due to the dangerous trend of road traffic collisions in Nigeria, which, in 2013, ranked it as one of the countries with the highest number of road traffic accidents worldwide (the most in Africa), the Nigerian government established the Federal Road Safety Corps (FRSC) in 1988 to address the carnage on the highways.

=== Level and trend of road traffic accidents ===
The Federal Road Safety Corps (FRSC) reported that 456 people died and 3,404 others were injured in 826 accidents recorded nationwide in January 2018.

The FRSC report for January was signed by Corps Marshal Boboye Oyeyemi.

=== The UN Sustainable Development Goals ===
In September 2015, the UN General Assembly adopted the 2030 Agenda for Sustainable Development, which includes 17 Sustainable Development Goals (SDGs). Building on the principle of "leaving no one behind," the agenda emphasizes a holistic approach to achieving sustainable development for all. Target 3.6 under Sustainable Development Goal 3 specifically addresses road traffic accidents. It states, "By 2020, halve the number of global deaths and injuries from road traffic accidents".

The Federal Government of Nigeria has implemented mechanisms to ensure the achievement of the SDGs in the country. However, Nigeria is still far from achieving this target. In 2025, President Bola Tinubu said the Federal Government was working towards a country where road accidents no longer claim lives. He made the statement during the International Day of Remembrance for Road Traffic Crash Victims Conference held in Abuja.

== Traditional/alternative medicine ==
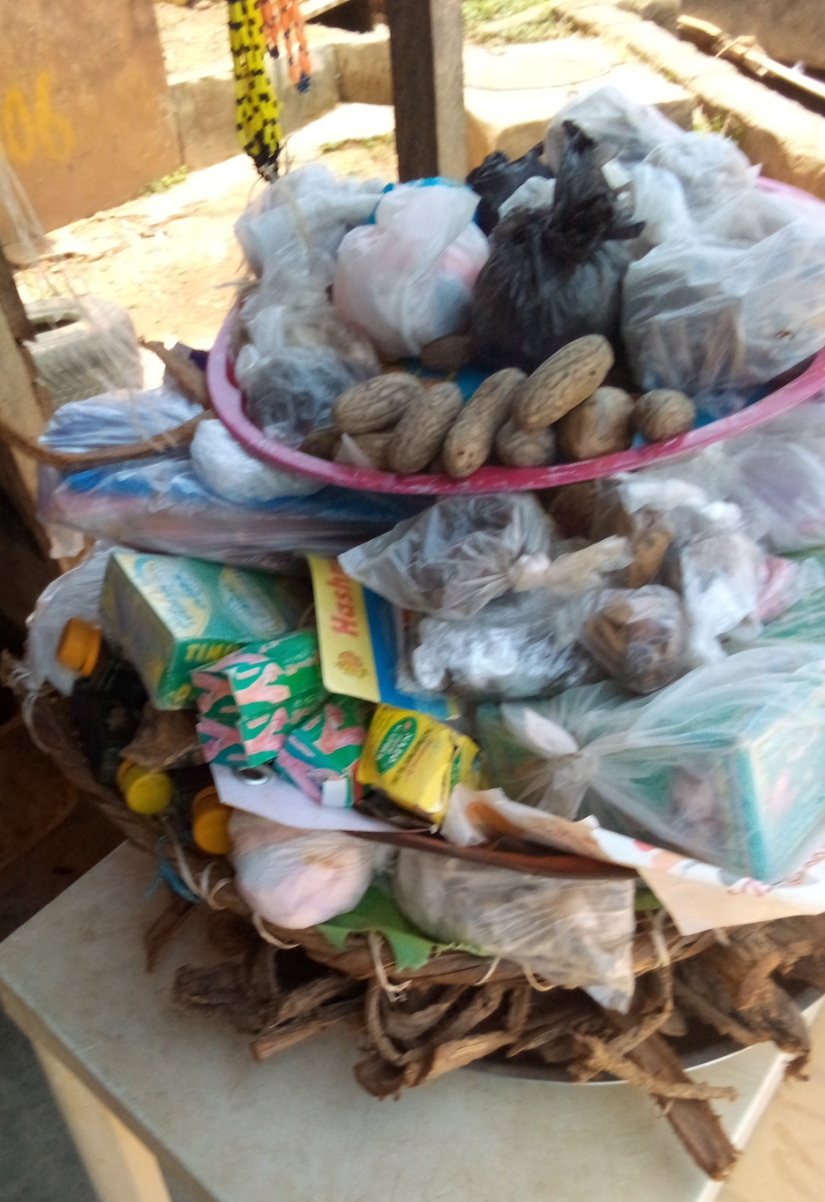
A tray of local herbal medicine products and concoctions

Recent reports have highlighted the risks associated with various forms of traditional and alternative medicine. While these treatments have benefits, many consumers lack sufficient information on how to use them safely, leading to potential harm. Although traditional medicine contributes significantly to health and the economy, the unregulated sale and misuse of these medicines, including herbs, has resulted in harm and delays in seeking professional healthcare.

== Climate change ==
With a population of around 200 million, Nigeria is the most populous country in Africa. As the continent's leading oil exporter, Nigeria faces the challenge of balancing global energy demands and domestic economic stability while addressing climate and environmental issues. The effects of climate change in Nigeria could include rising temperatures, more intense and frequent extreme weather events, and sea level rise. These changes could result in increased water and food insecurity, higher exposure to heat stress and ultraviolet radiation, shifts in disease transmission, and increased threats to coastal communities vulnerable to sea level rise. However, adequate adaptation and mitigation measures could help protect the population and present opportunities for improved health outcomes despite the challenges posed by climate change.

The greatest health risks stem from diseases that can result in mortality. Climate change could exacerbate existing diseases and contribute to the emergence of new ones, such as high blood pressure, psychosis, neurosis, and congenital malformations. Climate change compounds the challenges faced by an already impoverished population.

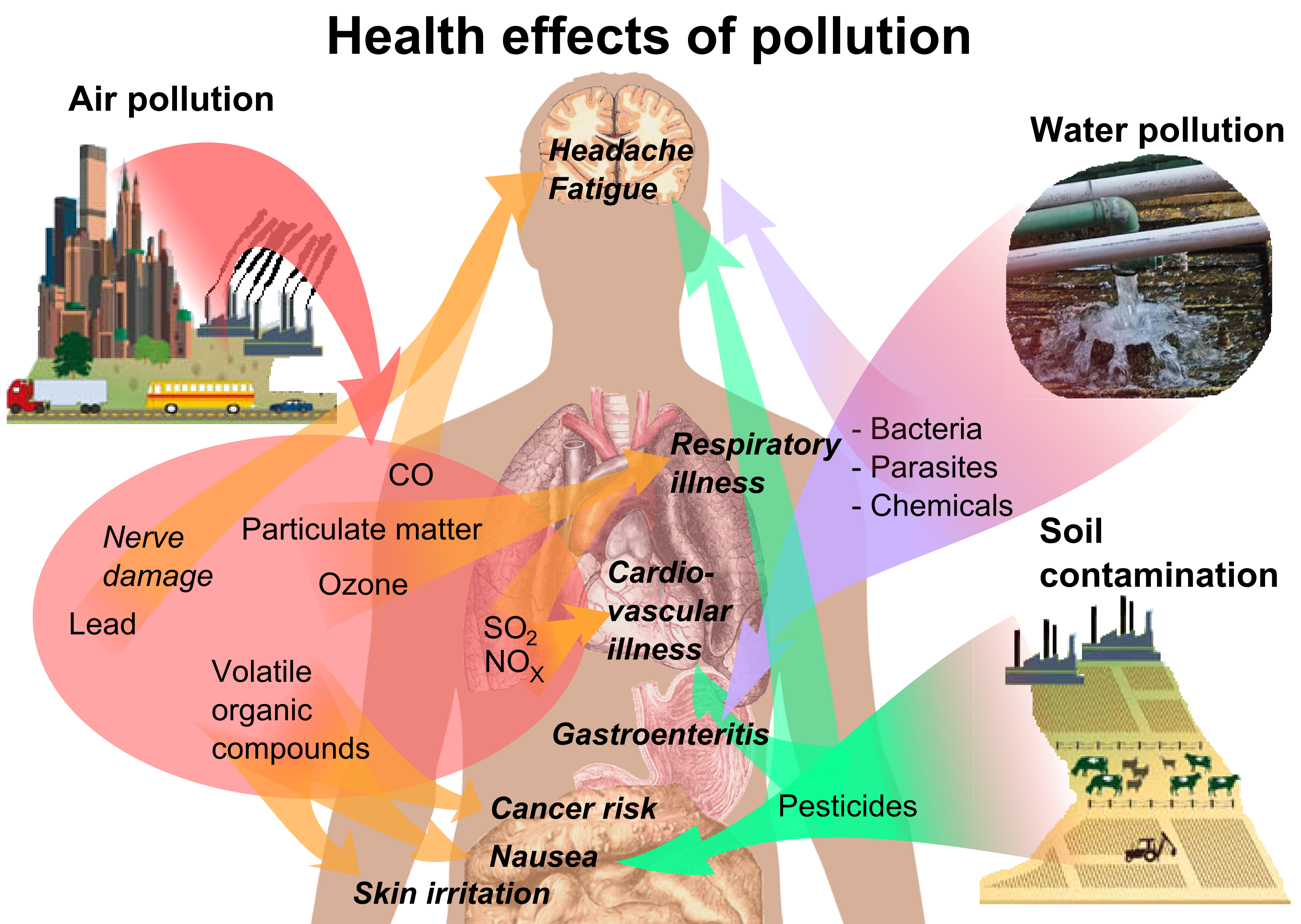
Health effects of pollution

Flooding, driven by rising sea levels and inadequate infrastructure, especially poorly planned drainage systems, poses significant health risks. Southern Nigeria, particularly Lagos—one meter above sea level—is highly susceptible to flooding, with the city facing potential extinction. The health implications of flooding include waterborne diseases such as typhoid, cholera, pneumonia, diarrhea, and malaria, which already place a significant burden on the Nigerian population.

Percentage of Total Deaths and DALYs of common diseases that can be aggravated by flood
| | Percentage of total deaths | Percentage of DALYs |
| Malaria | 12% | 11.16% |
| Typhoid fever | 0.22% | 0.24% |
| Diarreal diseases | 11.36% | 11.86% |
Source: Institute for Health Metrics and Evaluation (IHME 2019)

The WHO has identified diseases such as Schistosomiasis, African trypanosomiasis, malaria, lymphatic filariasis, onchocerciasis, and leishmaniasis as major tropical diseases. These diseases have a significant public health impact and economic consequences. As former WHO Director General Hiroshi Nakajima stated, these diseases hinder societal progress, make fertile land uninhabitable, impair intellectual and physical growth, and incur substantial treatment costs.

Increased temperatures also amplify the spread of diseases such as meningitis, measles, chicken pox, high blood pressure, and dehydration in pregnancy. The population in emerging countries is projected to grow from 2.3 billion in 2005 to 4 billion by 2030, leading to more carbon emissions and worsening urbanization issues, including poor housing. These changes increase the risk of heatwaves in cities.

Furthermore, high temperatures impact the spread of vector-borne diseases by accelerating the maturation of pathogens and increasing mosquito populations, which, in turn, raises the likelihood of disease transmission. Malaria parasites, for instance, are highly sensitive to temperature, which accelerates the reproductive cycles of mosquitoes and parasites.

Although Nigeria has acknowledged the potential health impacts of climate change, there remain gaps in planning and implementing mitigation strategies. The WHO's Climate and Health Country Profile for Nigeria (2015) highlights successes, such as the identification of a national focal point for climate change and the development of a national health adaptation strategy. However, there have been no significant efforts to strengthen institutional and technical capacities or to implement activities aimed at increasing health infrastructure resilience. Additionally, there have been no financial commitments (either domestic or international) to fund actions that would improve health resilience to climate change.

== See also ==
- Cardiovascular disease in Nigeria
- Healthcare in Nigeria
- Federal Ministry of Health
- Smoking in Nigeria
- Internship placement for health professionals in Nigeria

== Further consideration ==
- Nigeria's Neglected Diseases, National Public Radio, 3-part series. 12–13 March 2007.
