= Medical and Dental Council of Nigeria =

- Abbreviation: MDCN
- Formation: 1963; 63 years ago
- Headquarters: Plot 1102, Cadastral Zone B11, Off Oladipo Diya Road, Kaura District, Abuja, FCT.
- Location: Nigeria
- Coordinates: 9.0060°N 7.4472°E
- Chairman: Prof. Afolabi Lesi
- Registrar/CEO: Dr. Fatima Kyari
- Website: mdcn.gov.ng

The Medical and Dental Council of Nigeria (MDCN) is the statutory regulatory body responsible for the regulation of medical and dental practice in Nigeria. It was established by the Federal Government to ensure the provision of safe and effective healthcare services by maintaining professional standards, ethics, and discipline among medical and dental practitioners in the country.

== History ==
The MDCN was established by the Medical and Dental Practitioners Act Cap M8 LFN 2004, which repealed earlier regulations. The council began operations in 1963, shortly after Nigeria's independence, as part of efforts to develop a robust health system and ensure the professional integrity of medical and dental practitioners in Nigeria.

== Functions ==
The core functions of the Medical and Dental Council of Nigeria include:

- Regulating the practice of medicine, dentistry, and alternative medicine in Nigeria.
- Determining the standards of knowledge and skill required for registration as a practitioner.
- Accrediting medical and dental schools and monitoring training institutions.
- Maintaining the register of medical and dental practitioners in Nigeria.
- Investigating allegations of professional misconduct and disciplining erring practitioners.
- Issuing annual practicing licenses to qualified doctors and dentists.

== Structure ==
The council operates through a governing board composed of representatives from various sectors including:

- The Federal Ministry of Health
- Nigerian Medical Association (NMA)
- Nigerian Dental Association (NDA)
- Medical training institutions
- Practicing professionals from across Nigeria

The registrar is the chief executive officer and oversees the day-to-day administration of the council.

== Accreditation and licensing ==
The MDCN is responsible for accrediting medical and dental training institutions in Nigeria and abroad. It ensures that curricula, facilities, and faculty meet the required standards for producing competent healthcare professionals.

Graduates of accredited institutions must pass the MDCN licensing examination (often referred to as the Assessment Examination for foreign-trained graduates) before they can be registered and issued licenses to practice in Nigeria.

== Disciplinary role ==
The council has a Medical and Dental Practitioners Disciplinary Tribunal (MDPDT) which handles complaints and cases of professional misconduct, malpractice, or unethical behavior. Sanctions can range from suspension to outright de-registration, depending on the severity of the offense.

== Headquarters ==
The headquarters of the Medical and Dental Council of Nigeria is located in Abuja, the Federal Capital Territory, with additional zonal offices in various parts of the country.

== See also ==
- Nigerian Medical Association
- Healthcare in Nigeria
