= List of medical abbreviations: E =

Sortable table
Abbreviation	Meaning
E	ecstasy electrolytes Enterococcus epinephrine estradiol estrogen
E1	estrone
E2	estradiol
EAC	external acoustic meatus
EACA	epsilon-aminocaproic acid
EAEC	enteroadhesive Escherichia coli
EAF	enteric adherence factor
EAM	external auditory meatus
EB	epidermolysis bullosa
EBRT	external beam radiation therapy
EBL	estimated blood loss (see bleeding)
EBM	evidence-based medicine expressed breast milk
EBT	electron beam tomography
EBV	Epstein–Barr virus
EC	enteric coating
ECC	endocervical curettage
ECD	endocardial cushion defect
ECF	extracellular fluid enteric cytopathic human orphan
ECG	electrocardiogram
ECM	extracellular matrix
ECHO	enteric cytopathic human orphan virus
ECI	febris e causa ignota (normally written as febris E.C.I.) fever of unknown origin
ECLS	extracorporeal life support
ECMO	extracorporeal membrane oxygenation
ECP	emergency care practitioner
ECT	electroconvulsive therapy
ECTR	endoscopic carpal tunnel release
ED	eating disorder emergency department erectile dysfunction ectodermal dysplasia effective dose emotional distress
EDC	estimated date of confinement (at 40/40 weeks of pregnancy)
EDD	estimated date of delivery (at 40/40 weeks of pregnancy); expected date of delivery estimated date of discharge
EDF	end diastolic flow (describing the flow of blood through the umbilical artery)
EDH	epidural hematoma
EDM	esophageal Doppler monitor
EDRF	endothelium-derived relaxing factor aka nitric oxide
EDTA	ethylene-diamine-tetraacetic acid
EDS	Ehlers–Danlos syndrome
EDV	end-diastolic volume
EEE	eastern equine encephalitis
EEG	electroencephalogram
EENT	ears, eyes, nose, throat (see otolaryngology)
EEX	electrodiagnosis
EF	ejection fraction
EFM	electronic fetal monitoring, aka external fetal monitoring (cardiotocograph)
EFS	event-free survival
EFW	estimated fetal weight
EGBUS	external genitalia, Bartholin's glands, urethra & Skene's glands
EGD	esophagogastroduodenoscopy
EGF	epidermal growth factor
EGPA	eosinophilic granulomatosis with polyangiitis (formerly known as Churg–Strauss syndrome)
EHEC	enterohemorrhagic Escherichia coli
EIEC	enteroinvasive Escherichia coli
EIA	external iliac artery External iliac artery
EIB	Exercise Induced Bronchospasm
EJ	elbow jerk (triceps reflex)
EKG	electrocardiogram
ELLSCS	elective lower segment caesarean section
ELISA	enzyme-linked immunosorbent assay
EM	erythema multiforme
EMB	ethambutol endometrial biopsy or endomyocardial biopsy
EmBx	endometrial biopsy
EMC	encephalomyocarditis
EMD	early morning discovery electromechanical dissociation
EMDEX	essential medicines index
EMF	endomyocardial fibrosis
EMG	electromyography
EMLSCS	emergency lower segment Caesarean section
EMS	Emergency Medical Service(s)
EMU	early morning urine sample (being the most concentrated, generally used for pregnancy testing)
Emul	emulsion
ENT	ear, nose, and throat (see otolaryngology)
EOB	edge of bed
EoL	End-of-life (adjective)
EoLC	End-of-life care
EOM	extraocular muscles
EOMI	extraocular movements intact (see eye movement)
EPCT	estrogen-progesterone challenge test
EPEC	enteropathogenic Escherichia coli
EPH	edema, proteinuria, hypertension
Epi	epinephrine
EPO	erythropoietin
EPS	electrophysiology extrapyramidal syndromes
EQ	Empathy quotient
ER	emergency room
ERCP	endoscopic retrograde cholangiopancreatography
ERM	epiretinal membrane
ERMS	embryonal rhabdomyosarcoma
ERT	enzyme replacement therapy
ESA	erythropoiesis-stimulating agent
ESD	endoscopic submucosal dissection
ESHAP	etoposide, cisplatin, cytarabine, methylprednisolone (chemotherapy regimen for relapsed Non-Hodgkin lymphoma)
ESI	epidural steroid injection
ESKD	end-stage kidney disease
ESL	extracorporeal shockwave lithotripsy (also ESWL) (see lithotriptor); English as a second language (affects provider–patient communication)
ESBL	extended spectrum beta-lactamase (see also gram-negative bacteria)
ESM	ejection systolic murmur
ESR	erythrocyte sedimentation rate
ESRF	end-stage renal failure
ESRD	end-stage renal disease
ESS	empty sella syndrome enhanced support service
EST	endodermal sinus tumor
ESV	end-systolic volume
ESWL	extracorporeal shockwave lithotripsy (also ESL) (see lithotriptor)
ET	endothelin endotracheal embryo transfer Essential thrombocythemia
ETEC	enterotoxigenic Escherichia coli
Etiol	etiology
ETOH	ethanol (ethyl alcohol)
ETS	endoscopic thoracic sympathectomy
ETT	endotracheal tube
EUA	examination under anesthesia
EUP	extrauterine pregnancy
EUS	endoscopic ultrasonography
EVA	enlarged vestibular aqueduct
EVAR	endovascular aneurysm repair
EVD	external ventricular drain
EVF	erythrocyte volume fraction (see hematocrit)
Ex-n	previously; used for premature infants that have been born (ex-28 = born at 28 weeks gestation)
Exam	examination (for example, physical examination)
Exp Lap	exploratory laparotomy
Ext	extremities
