= Mfon =

Mfon // is a common Efik and Ibibio given name. It means 'grace' and is often an element in long names, like Daramfon ('celebrate grace') or Mfonabasi ('God's grace') or Mfonobong ('Lord's grace' but also 'chief's' and 'ruler's'). Notable people with the name include:

- Mfon Ekpo, Nigerian entrepreneur and author
- Mfon Udoh, Nigerian footballer
- Mfon Udoka (born 1976), Nigerian-American basketball player

== See also ==
- Fon (title), sometimes spelled 'mfon', a chieftain or king of a region of Cameroon
- MegaFon, a phone operator with the stock symbol MFON
