= Psychoactive drugs in Nigeria =

Psychoactive drugs, also known as psychotropic substances, are chemical substances that affect the central nervous system and alter brain function, leading to temporary changes in perception, mood, consciousness, and behavior. In Nigeria, the use, abuse, and regulation of psychoactive substances have been a major public health and social concern. Various categories of psychoactive drugs, including stimulants, depressants, hallucinogens, and opioids, are prevalent in different parts of the country, impacting both urban and rural communities.

== History and cultural context ==
The use of psychoactive substances in Nigeria dates back centuries, with indigenous communities traditionally consuming local stimulants such as kola nuts and herbal preparations for medicinal, religious, and social purposes. However, the introduction of synthetic and highly potent drugs has significantly changed the drug landscape. The widespread use of substances such as cannabis, tramadol, codeine, and methamphetamine has become a pressing issue, especially among youth and vulnerable populations.

== Commonly used psychoactive substances ==
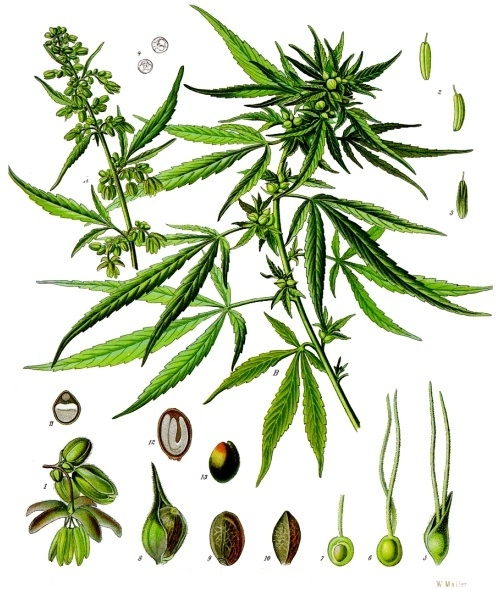

- Cannabis : known locally as "Igbo," is one of the most widely used illicit drugs in Nigeria. The plant is grown in different parts of the country, particularly in the southwestern and southeastern regions. Despite being illegal, its consumption remains widespread, especially among young people and commercial drivers.

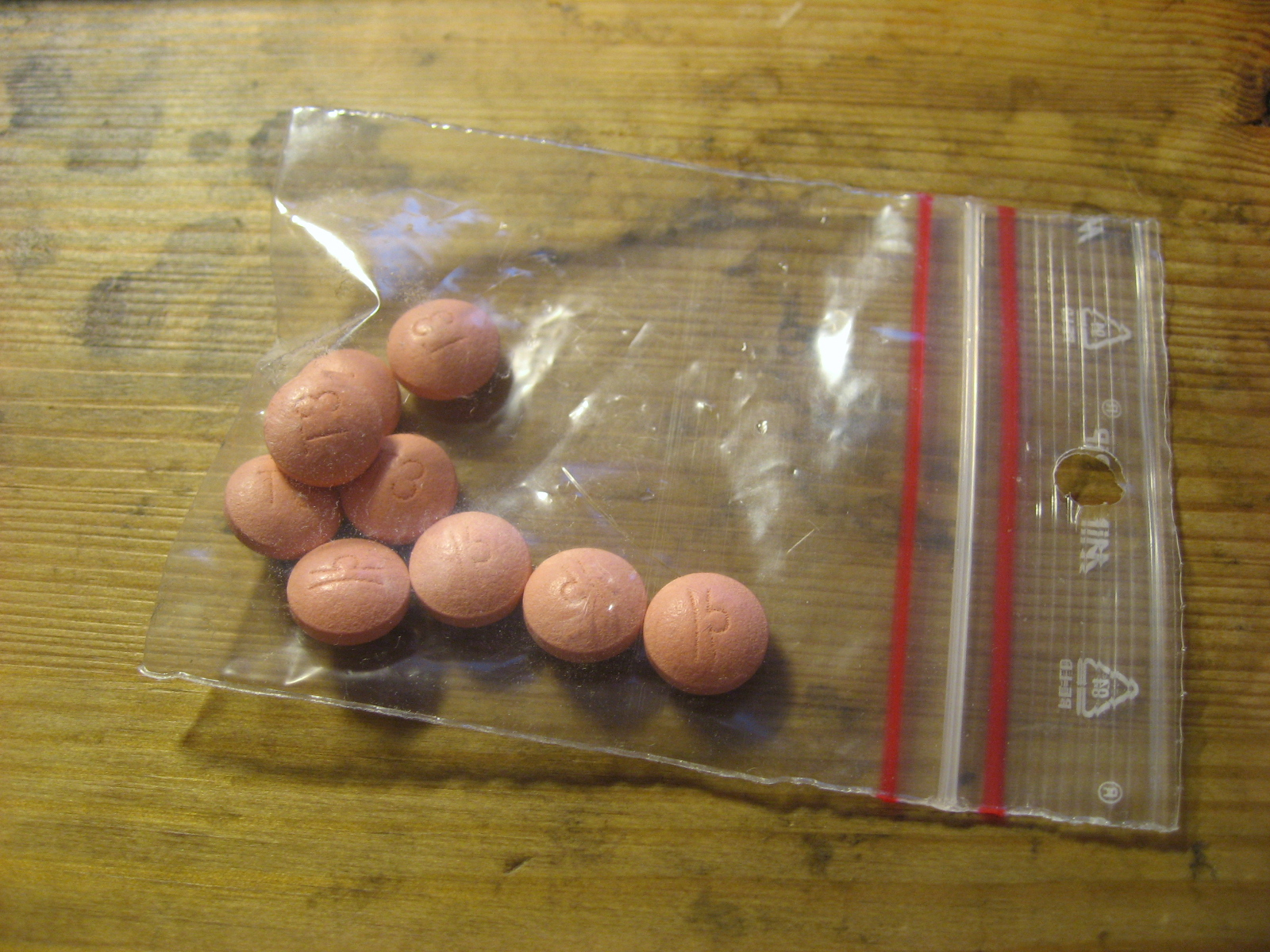
Tramal 200mg pills

- Tramadol: a synthetic opioid analgesic, is widely abused in Nigeria, particularly by youths and laborers seeking to enhance their physical endurance. It is often misused in higher-than-prescribed doses, leading to addiction and severe health complications.
- Codeine and Cough Syrups: commonly found in cough syrups, has been abused for its sedative and euphoric effects. Following reports of widespread addiction and health risks, the Nigerian government banned the production and importation of codeine based cough syrups in 2018.
- Methamphetamine: locally referred to as "mkpuru-mmiri," has seen a rise in abuse, especially in southeastern Nigeria. The highly addictive stimulant has severe effects on mental and physical health, contributing to crime and social instability.
- Alcohol: This remains the most widely consumed psychoactive substance in Nigeria. While legal, excessive consumption contributes to numerous social problems, including domestic violence, road accidents, and health issues such as liver disease.
- Other Substances: Other psychoactive substances found in Nigeria include cocaine, heroin, LSD, Rohypnol, and inhalants like petrol and glue, which are commonly abused by street children and marginalized populations.

== Impact on society ==
The abuse of psychoactive drugs in Nigeria has led to several socio-economic and health challenges. These include:

- Public Health Issues: Increased cases of drug-induced psychosis, organ damage, and infectious diseases such as HIV/AIDS due to shared needles.
- Crime and Violence: Drug abuse has been linked to a rise in violent crimes, cultism, and armed robbery.
- Economic Burden: The cost of rehabilitation and law enforcement places a strain on the economy and public resources.
- Educational Disruptions: Many young people drop out of school due to drug addiction, leading to a decline in human capital development.

== Government regulations and policies ==
The Nigerian government, through the National Drug Law Enforcement Agency (NDLEA), is responsible for enforcing drug laws and combating drug trafficking. Some key measures include:

- Banning of Codeine Cough Syrups (2018): A response to the rising cases of addiction.
- Drug Rehabilitation and Awareness Campaigns: Various non-governmental organizations (NGOs) and government agencies conduct educational programs on drug abuse prevention.
- Strengthening Border Control: Efforts to curb drug smuggling through Nigeria's porous borders.
- Legislation and Law Enforcement: The Dangerous Drugs Act and the NDLEA Act provide legal frameworks for tackling drug-related offenses.

== See also ==
- National Drug Law Enforcement Agency
- Mental health in Nigeria
- Cannabis in Nigeria
