= TCTR =

TCTR may refer to:

- thread carpal tunnel release, a medical surgical procedure
- Texas City Terminal Railway (est. 1921) operator of the rail line at the Port of Texas City, Texas City, Texas, USA
- T-Center (T-Ctr) office building in Vienna, Austria
