= Thread trigger finger release =

- Procedure of thread trigger finger release
- Other names: TTFR

Thread trigger finger release is an ultrasound-guided minimally invasive procedure of performing trigger finger release using a piece of surgical dissecting thread as a dividing element, instead of using a scalpel or a needle tip, as in open trigger finger release or percutaneous trigger finger release.

The technique of thread trigger finger release is the application of the Guo technique and the procedure is similar to that of the thread carpal tunnel release.

The successful rate of TTFR is high and there are almost no complications such as incomplete release, neurovascular or flexor tendon or A2 pulley injury, infection, bow string, or reflex sympathetic dystrophy. Triggering and locking are resolved, and complete extension and flexion are recovered immediately after the release in all cases. The patient does not take painkillers postoperatively. Most patients return to light daily activity with caution right after the procedure.

The technique of TTFR is clinically feasible, safe and effective.
