= Federal Medical Centre, Birnin Kudu =

Federal Medical Centre in Nigeria

Geography
- Location: Birnin Kudu, Jigawa State, Nigeria

Organisation
- Care system: Public

Services
- Emergency department: Yes

History
- Founded: 1961

Links
- Website: fmcbkd.gov.ng

Federal Medical Centre, Birnin Kudu is a federal government of Nigeria medical centre located in Birnin Kudu, Jigawa State, Nigeria. The current chief medical director is Dr. Adamu Abdullahi Atterwahmie.

== History ==
Federal Medical Centre, Birnin Kudu was established in 1961. The hospital was formerly known as General Hospital, Birnin Kudu.

== Heads of Departments ==
- Auwalu Yusuf Birnin Kudu - Information and Public Relations
- Saude Adamu Usman - Physiotherapy
- Dr. Halima Umar Ibrahim - Paediatrics
- Bashir Adamu - Information Technology Unit
- Dr. Uwadia Emeke (FMCFD) - Dental and Maxillofacial
- Dr. Mohammed Jamiu K - Ear Nose and Throat (ENT)
- Aminu Ado Taura - Environment Health
- Dr. Riyad Mohammed - Family Medicine
- Abdullahi Muhammad - Health Information Management
- Muhammad Also Abubakar - Medical Laboratory Services
- Dr. Abbas Sa’ad Bello - Medicine
- Head of Nursing Services - Nursing Services
- Dr. Emmanuel Ajuluchukwu Ugwa - Obstetrics & Gynecology
- Dr. Abubakar Mamuda - Ophthalmology
- Dr. Auwalu Dahiru - Orthopeadic
- Pharm. Abdurrashid Muhammad - Pharmacy
- Dr. Shehu Yunusa - Psychiatry
- Dr. Atiku Hafiz - Radiology
- Dr. Yusuf Nura Kassin - Surgery
- Nrs Mustapha I. Wurno - Main Operation Theatre
- Dr. Jatto Hamzah - Accident and Emergency

== Departments ==
- Department of radiology
- Department of nursing
- Department of family medicine
- Department of environmental health
- Department of dental and maxillofacial
- Department of medical laboratory services
- Department of surgery
- Department of pharmacy
- Department of physiotherapy
- Department of health information management
- Department of public health
- Department of pediatrics
- Department of psychiatrist
- Department of obstetric and gynaecology
- Department of orthopedic
- Department of ophthalmology
- Department of accident and emergency
- Department of anaesthesia and intensive care unit.

== CMD ==
The current chief medical director is Dr Adamu Abdullahi Atterwahmie.

== Tree planting project ==
Closer towards the ending of 2024, there was a planting of over 2000 tree in the federal medical center Birnin Kudu in jigsaw state, this is to prevent soil erosion, environmental degradation and environmental conservation in the medical facilities.

== See also ==
- Healthcare in Nigeria
- Jigawa State
