= Delta State Ministry of Health =

State government ministry responsible for public health in Delta State, Nigeria

Agency overview
- Jurisdiction: Government of Delta State
- Headquarters: State Secretariat Complex, Asaba, Delta State, Nigeria
- Agency executive: Dr. Joseph Onojaeme, Commissioner for Health
- Parent department: Government of Delta State
- Website: https://deltastate.gov.ng/category/health/

The Delta State Ministry of Health is the state government ministry responsible for the formulation, implementation, and regulation of health policies in Delta State, Nigeria. The ministry oversees public health programmes, healthcare delivery systems, medical institutions, disease control, and health planning across the state. It plays a central role in coordinating statewide health strategies in line with national policies established by the Federal Ministry of Health. The delta State Ministry of Health is located at the State Secretariat Complex, Asaba.

== History ==
The ministry was established following the creation of Delta State in 1991, with the mandate to improve population health outcomes and regulate healthcare institutions across the state. Over the years, the ministry has expanded its programmes in maternal and child health, disease surveillance, immunization, environmental health, and health insurance.

== Mandate and Functions ==
The core responsibilities of the Delta State Ministry of Health include:

- Developing and implementing state health policies and guidelines.
- Supervising public hospitals and primary healthcare facilities.
- Coordinating disease surveillance and epidemic response.
- Regulating private healthcare providers.
- Overseeing immunization and public health campaigns.
- Promoting health education and community health programmes.

== Departments ==
The ministry operates through various departments, including:

- Department of Public Health
- Department of Medical Services
- Department of Nursing Services
- Department of Pharmaceutical Services
- Department of Planning, Research and Statistics
- Department of Administration and Finance

These departments work together to deliver statewide health services and support local government health authorities.

== Programmes and Initiatives ==
The ministry implements several initiatives aimed at improving healthcare access and quality, such as:

- Strengthening primary healthcare systems.
- Expanding maternal and child health services.
- Managing the Delta State Contributory Health Scheme
- Coordinating immunization efforts and disease control interventions.
- Collaborating with national and international health partners, including WHO and UNICEF.

== Leadership ==
The ministry is headed by the Commissioner for Health, who provides strategic direction and oversees policy implementation. As of 2025, the position is held by Dr. Joseph Onojaeme.

== See also ==
- Delta State
- Federal Ministry of Health (Nigeria)
- Healthcare in Nigeria
