= Carpal tunnel surgery =

Surgery to relieve carpal tunnel syndrome

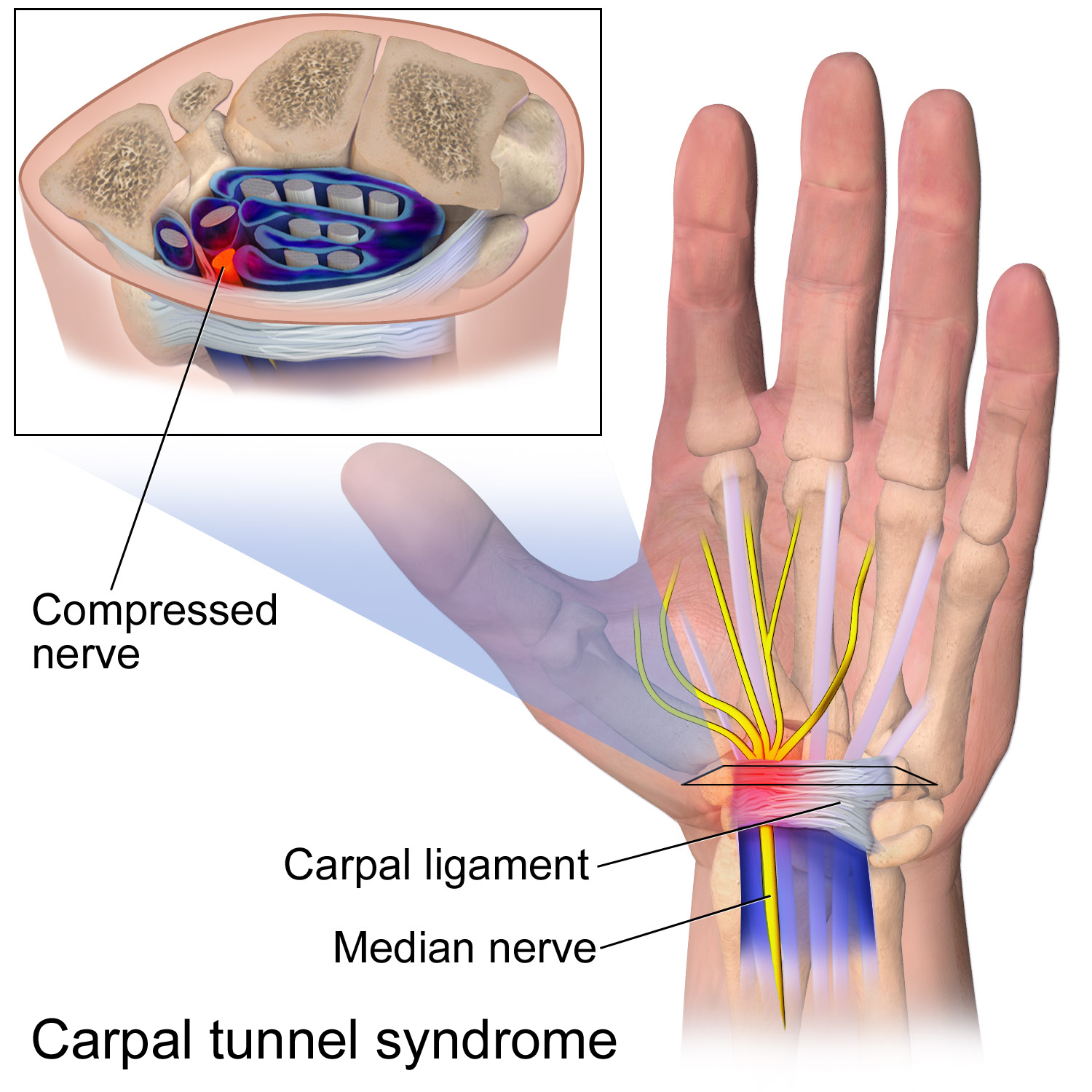
- Indication of the site of the problem in carpal tunnel syndrome.
- Specialty: Orthopedic surgeon

Carpal tunnel surgery, also called carpal tunnel release (CTR) and carpal tunnel decompression surgery, is a nerve decompression in which the transverse carpal ligament is divided. It is a surgical treatment for carpal tunnel syndrome (CTS) and recommended when there is constant (not just intermittent) numbness, muscle weakness, or atrophy, and when night-splinting no longer controls intermittent symptoms of pain in the carpal tunnel. In general, milder cases can be controlled for months to years, but severe cases are unrelenting symptomatically and are likely to result in surgical treatment. In the United States, approximately 500,000 surgical procedures are performed each year, and the economic impact of this condition is estimated to exceed $2 billion annually.

== Indications ==
The procedure is used as a treatment for carpal tunnel syndrome and according to the American Academy of Orthopaedic Surgeons (AAOS) treatment guidelines, early surgery is an option when there is clinical evidence of median nerve denervation or the patient elects to proceed directly to surgical treatment. Management decisions rely on several factors, including the etiology and chronicity of CTS, symptom severity, and individual patient choices. Nonsurgical treatment measures are appropriate in the initial management of most idiopathic cases of CTS. Splinting and corticosteroid injections may be prescribed, and they have proven benefits. Steroid injections can provide relief if symptoms are of short duration. If no improvement is seen following steroid injection, carpal tunnel release may not be as effective. Surgical treatment is indicated in acute cases of CTS from trauma or infection, in chronic cases with denervation of the abductor pollicis brevis muscle or a pronounced sensory loss, and in cases unresponsive to conservative management.

Before pursuing CTR, confirmation of the diagnosis of carpal tunnel syndrome is recommended, given that the symptoms of median nerve entrapment can overlap with other disorders including: cervical radiculopathy, thoracic outlet syndrome, and pronator syndrome. Beyond physical exam testing, confirmatory electrodiagnostic studies are recommended for all patients being considered for surgery. Nerve conduction studies are reported to be 90% sensitive and 60% specific for the diagnosis of carpal tunnel syndrome. These studies provide the surgeon with a patient baseline and can rule out other syndromes that present similarly. Specifically, a distal motor latency of more than 4.5 ms and a sensory latency of more than 3.5 ms are considered abnormal. Of note, these electrodiagnostic studies can yield normal results despite symptomatic median nerve compression. In this scenario, CTR should be considered only if physical signs of median nerve dysfunction are present in addition to classical symptoms of CTS.

== Surgical techniques ==
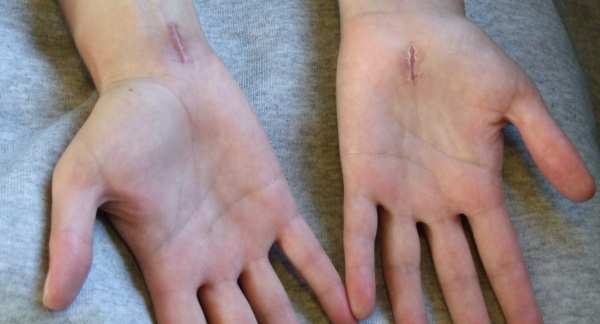
Scars from carpal tunnel release surgery. Two different techniques were used. The left scar is 6 weeks old, the right scar is 2 weeks old. Also note the muscular atrophy of the thenar eminence in the left hand, a common sign of advanced CTS.

The goal of any carpal tunnel release surgery is to divide the transverse carpal ligament and the distal aspect of the volar ante brachial fascia, thereby decompressing the median nerve and providing relief. The transverse carpal ligament is a wide ligament that runs across the hand, from the scaphoid bone to the hamate bone and pisiform. It forms the roof of the carpal tunnel, and when the surgeon cuts across it (i.e., in a line with the ring finger) it no longer presses down on the nerve inside, relieving the pressure.

The two major types of surgery are open carpal tunnel release and endoscopic carpal tunnel release. Open carpal tunnel release can be performed through a standard incision or a limited incision. Endoscopic carpal tunnel release, which can be performed through a single or double portal. Most surgeons historically have performed the open procedure, widely considered to be the gold standard. However, since the 1990s, a growing number of surgeons now offer endoscopic carpal tunnel release. Existing research does not show significant differences in outcomes of one kind of surgery versus the other, so patients can choose a surgeon they like and the surgeon also will practice the technique they like.

Historically, carpal tunnel release was performed under general anesthesia with a tourniquet, however the worldwide trend is now for 'wide awake hand surgery': with no tourniquet, no general or regional anesthesia and no sedation; which also enables carpal tunnel release to be performed under local anesthesia as a one stop procedure.

After carpal tunnel surgery, the long term use of a splint on the wrist should not be used for relief. Splints do not improve grip strength, lateral pinch strength, or bowstringing. While splints may protect people working with their hands, using a splint does not change complication rates or patient satisfaction. Using splints can cause problems including adhesion and lack of flexibility.

Carpal tunnel surgery is usually performed by a hand surgeon, orthopaedic surgeon, or plastic surgeon.

=== Open surgery ===
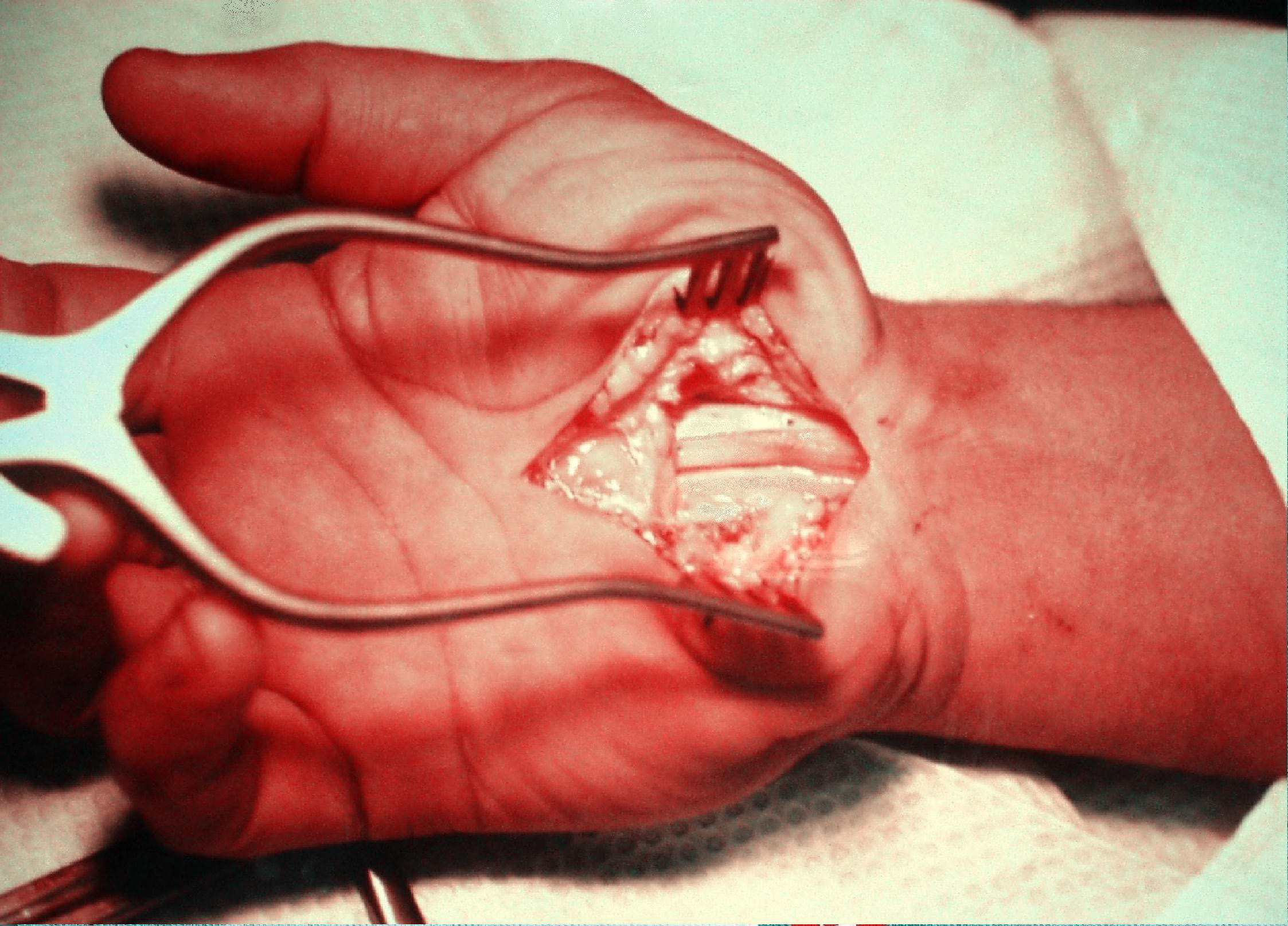
The traditional open carpal tunnel surgery

Open carpal tunnel release (OCTR) has long been considered the gold-standard surgical treatment for CTS. This approach allows for direct visualization of the anatomy and possible anatomical variants, which minimizes the risk of damaging critical structures. It also provides the surgeon with the option of probing the carpal canal for other structures that may be contributing to the compression of the median nerve, including ganglions and tumors. The technique involves placement of a longitudinal incision at the base of the hand. There are a few ways to determine where the incision can be placed. One of the ways is to make an incision over the carpal tunnel where it lines up with the 3rd web space of the hand. The other way is to bring the ring finger down and where that lays is where the incision can be made. The length of the skin incision varies but typically is <4 cm. The subcutaneous tissue, the superficial palmar fascia, and the muscle of the palmaris brevis (if present) are also incised in line with the incision, thereby exposing the TCL. With the incision of the transverse carpal ligament longitudinally, the median nerve is exposed. The release is extended to the superficial palmar arterial arch distally and for a limited distance proximally beneath the wrist flexion creases. For optimal outcomes, the TCL must be completely released while avoiding damage to the vital structures. The flexor tendons can be retracted to inspect the floor of the canal for lesions. Scar tenderness, pillar pain, weakness, and delays in return to work can occasionally be seen following an OCTR.

The open release technique has been compared to other treatments. The latest meta-data indicates that symptoms deteriorate for 2 weeks after open release compared to endoscopic surgery, but after 2 weeks open surgery is associated with greater improvements and a higher chance of cure.

==== Postoperative care ====
A light compression dressing and a volar splint may be applied. The hand is actively used as soon as possible after surgery, but the dependent position is avoided. Usually, the dressing can be removed by the patient at home 2 or 3 days after the surgery, and then gentle washing and showering of the hand is permitted. Gradual resumption of normal hand use is encouraged. If non-absorbable sutures are used, they are removed after 10 to 14 days. A splint may be continued for comfort as needed for 14 to 21 days.

=== Limited open carpal tunnel release ===
Limited-incision carpal tunnel release techniques similar to endoscopic surgery were developed to decrease palmar discomfort and hasten the return to activities. It allows for adequate exposure to avoid complications and keeps the incision out of the painful portion of the palm. The surgical approach involves a small skin incision in the palm followed by release of the distal end of the TCL under direct visualization. Patients experience reduced post-operative pain as this techniques leaves the palmar fascia intact over the proximal TCL.

==== Carpal tunnel release through mini-transverse approach (CTRMTA) ====
Sayed Issa's approach is a carpal tunnel release through a small approach on the distal wrist crease; it is about 1.5 cm; the benefits of this technique are less surgical traumatic and more tender, it takes less time for rehabilitation, so the patient can work next day of operation, and it has very cosmetic and gentle scar in results and outcome. A skin incision is made and the surgeon will dissect through fat and the superficial palmar fascia. Once the superficial palmar fascia has been released the transverse carpal ligament will be exposed. The transverse carpal ligament will be cut longitudinally to release it.

=== Endoscopic carpal tunnel release ===
Endoscopic techniques for carpal tunnel release involve one or two smaller incisions (less than half inch each) through which instrumentation is introduced including a synovial elevator, probes, knives, and an endoscope used to visualize the underside of the transverse carpal ligament. The endoscopic methods do not divide the subcutaneous tissues or the palmar fascia to the same degree as does the open method. Compared to open release, endoscopic decompression improves symptoms better in the first two weeks after surgery but in the longer term and overall, recovery is inferior to open release. Advocates of endoscopic carpal tunnel release cite less palmar scarring and ulnar "pillar" pain. Some studies comparing open and endoscopic carpal tunnel release found no significant differences in function. The advantages of the endoscopic technique in grip strength and pain relief are realized within the first 12 weeks and seem to benefit those patients not involved in compensable injuries. However, problems related to endoscopic carpal tunnel release include (1) a technically demanding procedure; (2) a limited visual field that prevents inspection of other structures; (3) the vulnerability of the median nerve, flexor tendons, and superficial palmar arterial arch; (4) the inability to control bleeding easily; and (5) the limitations imposed by mechanical failure. Although this technique has proved to be effective, it may not be applicable to every patient with carpal tunnel syndrome. If an endoscopic release cannot be accomplished safely, the procedure should be converted to an open technique.

Briefly, the endoscopic method can be performed using either one portal, or two portals. In the Agee single-portal technique, a small transverse skin incision is made at the ulnar border of the palamaris longus tendon. A distally based flap of forearm fascia is elevated to expose the proximal end of the carpal canal. With the wrist held in slight extension, the endoscopic blade is inserted into the canal, the distal edge of the TCL is identified, and the ligament is sectioned distally to proximally. The two portal technique requires a proximal incision and a distal incision deep to the TCL.

Many surgeons have embraced limited incision methods. It is considered to be the procedure of choice for many of these surgeons with respect to idiopathic carpal tunnel syndrome. Supporting this are the results of some of the previously mentioned series that cite no difference in the rate of complications for either method of surgery. Thus, there has been broad support for either surgical procedure using a variety of devices or incisions.

=== Thread carpal tunnel release ===
Procedure of Thread Carpal Tunnel Release

The thread carpal tunnel release (TCTR) is a minimally invasive procedure for transecting the transverse carpal ligament (TCL) by sawing a piece of thread looped percutaneously under the guidance of ultrasound. The TCTR is performed under local anesthesia in a clinic based procedure room, and results in only one needle entry point at the palm and one needle exit point in the wrist. The technique ensures that the division happens only inside the loop of the thread around the TCL without injuring adjacent tissues. The features of the procedure includes the potentials of reduced risk of iatrogenic injury, reduced surgical cost, and reduced patient recovery time.

=== Percutaneous carpal tunnel release ===
The sono-guided percutaneous surgical technique approach involves the use of ultrasound visibility by a surgeon in a day clinic setting, under local anesthesia, and without the use of a tourniquet or sedation. Before the operation, a thorough sonographic evaluation is conducted to identify important landmarks, structures at risk, and anatomical variations. Specific classifications, such as the Lanz classification for the median nerve motor branch, the Ferrari and Gilbert classification for Berrettini anastomosis, and the Lippert and Pabst classification for the superficial palmar arch, are assessed. The cross-sectional area (CSA) of the median nerve and the transverse carpal ligament's (TCL) thickness are measured at several anatomically significant points.

The limb is disinfected and draped during the procedure, ensuring sterility with a covered ultrasound probe and sterile gel. Local anesthesia is applied under sonographic control. A small skin puncture opening is made with a 14-gauge catheter, followed by the introduction of a 1.5mm probe to palpate the TCL and establish the safe zone for release. The surgical instrument, similar to a bent needle, is then used for the gradual release of the Transverse Carpal Ligament, monitored by sonographic imaging to confirm completeness. If uncertainty remains regarding the full release of the TCL, the procedure may be repeated.

== Outcomes ==
Carpal tunnel syndrome cannot be cured, but surgery to alleviate symptoms can be successful. Success is greatest in patients with the most typical symptoms. The most common cause of failure is incorrect diagnosis, and this surgery will only mitigate carpal tunnel syndrome, and will not relieve symptoms with alternative causes. The recurrence rate after primary carpal tunnel release is approximately 2%. The success rate of surgery to relieve symptoms depends on the definition of "success" and the metrics applied. For example, with respect to alleviation of symptoms, up to 90% success is reported. Yet with respect to patient satisfaction, approximately 50% is reported. The rate at which patients return to their former employer also is less than 90%. Yet approximately 25% of those patients are re-tasked to another duty in order to minimize further stress on their hands.

In general, endoscopic techniques are as effective as traditional open carpal surgeries, though the faster recovery time (2–3 weeks) typically noted in endoscopic procedures is felt by some to possibly be offset by higher complication rates.

A recent Cochrane Review showed that the use of absorbable sutures (stitches that the body dissolves) provide the same outcomes (i.e. scar quality, pain levels, etc.) as non-absorbable sutures but are much cheaper.

== Risks and complications ==
Complications and failures are estimated to be 3% to 19%. Unrelieved symptoms may lead to repeat operation in 12% of patients. Because most patients obtain relief in the early postoperative period, it is difficult to attribute one anatomical cause to recurrent symptoms. Findings reported at reoperation include incomplete release of the transverse carpal ligament, re-formation of the flexor retinaculum, scarring in the carpal tunnel, median or palmar cutaneous neuroma, palmar cutaneous nerve entrapment, recurrent granulomatous or inflammatory tenosynovitis, and hypertrophic scar in the skin.

As with most soft-tissue surgeries of the hand, postoperative wound infection is rare after CTR, occurring in only 0.36% of cases. Most of these are superficial, with only 0.13% of cases having deep infections.

The most common complication with open carpal tunnel release surgery is pillar pain (pain in the thenar or hypothenar eminence that is worse with pressure or grasping), followed by laceration of the palmar cutaneous branch of the median nerve. Pillar pain occurs in approximately 25% of surgical cases, with symptom resolution reported in most patients by 3 months. There is no difference in the rates of pillar pain between patients undergoing open or endoscopic release. Incomplete release of the TCL with persistent or recurrent CTS symptoms is the most frequent complication attributed to endoscopic carpal tunnel release surgery. Recurrent CTS develops in 7% to 20% of surgical cases. The problem is difficult to address, and revision surgery is less successful than primary carpal tunnel release surgery.

Injury to the median nerve proper occurs in 0.06% of cases. Risk of nerve injury has been found to be higher in patients undergoing endoscopic CTR compared with open, though most are temporary neurapraxias. The palmar cutaneous branch of the median nerve may be injured during superficial skin dissection or while releasing the proximal portion of the transverse carpal ligament with scissors or an endoscopic device. Nerve injury can lead to persistent paresthesias or painful neuroma formation.

In addition to pain, patients may have mechanical symptoms related to the flexor tendons contained in the carpal tunnel after release of the transverse carpal ligament. Damage to the tendons during release may cause inflammation and adhesions leading to triggering at the wrist.

== Balloon carpal tunnelplasty ==
Balloon carpal tunnelplasty is an experimental technique that uses a minimally invasive balloon catheter director to access the carpal tunnel. As with a traditional tissue elevator-expander, balloon carpal tunnelplasty elevates the carpal ligament, increasing the space in the carpal tunnel. As an experiment it has been described but there are no peer-reviewed series available in the current hand surgical literature that review or comment upon the procedure. The technique is performed through a one-centimeter incision at the distal wrist crease. It is monitored and expansion is confirmed by direct or endoscopic visualization. The technique's secondary goals are to avoid to incision in the palm of the hand, to avoid cutting of the transverse carpal ligament, and to maintain the biomechanics of the hand.

== See also ==
- Carpal tunnel
- Carpal tunnel syndrome
- Median nerve
- Nerve decompression
