= ECTR =

ECTR may refer to:

- European Council on Tolerance and Reconciliation
- endoscopic carpal tunnel release, a medical surgical procedure
- E-Center (E-Ctr) a multipurpose arena in West Valley City, Utah, USA
- E-Centre (E-Ctr) an amphitheater-theatre complex in Camden, New Jersey, USA
