= Childbirth in Nigeria =

Childbirth practices in Nigeria vary between urban and rural areas, traditional and modern medicine, and among ethnic and religious groups. As the most populous country in Africa, Nigeria has one of the highest fertility rates, with an estimate of 9.22 million births annually. The country faces significant challenges in maternal and child health, accounting for approximately 20% of global maternal deaths.

== See also ==
- Healthcare in Nigeria
- Reproductive rights in Nigeria
