= Mfon Ekpo =

Nigerian entrepreneur, lawyer and author

- Born: November 16, 1982 (age 44)
- Citizenship: Nigeria
- Occupation: Author

Mfon Ekpo (born 16 November 1982) is a Nigerian entrepreneur, lawyer, author, leadership consultant and development strategist. She is the chief executive officer of The Discovery Centre, a training and development organisation, and has served as an executive director and leadership trainer with organisations including The Future Project and the Maxwell Leadership Certified Team. She is also the founder of The Blueprint of How leadership and development programme and the convener of the Global Knowledge Festival.

Ekpo was selected in 2014 for President Barack Obama's Young African Leaders Initiative and subsequently served as chair of the advocacy committee of the Regional Advisory Board for the Mandela Washington Fellowship. She was also appointed an honorary citizen and Goodwill Ambassador of the U.S. state of Arkansas.

In 2025, Ekpo received the Outstanding Contribution Alumni Award from the University of Southampton, where she obtained an LLM in Maritime Law in 2011. The university described the award as recognising her contribution to leadership development, civic engagement and social impact.

In 2026, she founded and commissioned Africa's first Global Knowledge Centre in Uyo, Akwa Ibom State, establishing a permanent hub for knowledge, learning, leadership, collaboration, discovery and human development.

== Early life and education ==
Ekpo studied law and subsequently obtained an LLM in Maritime Law from the University of Southampton in the United Kingdom. She has undertaken additional training in areas including journalism, business law, negotiation, project management and neuro-linguistic programming.

While at the Nigerian Law School, she received an award for professional ethics. Her professional background combines legal training with leadership development, organisational consulting and entrepreneurship.

== Career ==
Ekpo began her professional career in law and subsequently moved into leadership development, organisational consulting and social-impact initiatives. She founded The Discovery Centre, a training and development organisation focused on leadership, personal development and organisational performance.

She later became executive director of The Future Project, an organisation associated with The Future Awards and programmes focused on youth leadership, entrepreneurship and civic engagement. Her appointment took effect in January 2014, having previously served as chief operating officer of the organisation.

In 2014, Ekpo was selected as part of President Barack Obama's Young African Leaders Initiative. She later became chair of the Advocacy Committee of the Regional Advisory Board for the Mandela Washington Fellowship.

Ekpo has worked as a leadership trainer and consultant and has conducted values-based leadership programmes in a number of countries. The University of Southampton has described her work as including leadership development, consulting and programmes aimed at developing individuals and organisations.

She is a founding partner and executive director associated with the Maxwell Leadership Certified Team and has worked with leadership expert John Maxwell. She has also spoken at universities and leadership programmes in Nigeria, the United Kingdom and the United States.

== The Blueprint of How ==
In 2016, Ekpo founded The Blueprint of How, a leadership and development seminar initially focused on helping women develop strategies for turning ideas into sustainable ventures. The programme subsequently expanded to include men and women and was held in several African cities.

The programme developed into a broader platform for discussions and training around leadership, entrepreneurship, personal development, execution and human potential. In 2023, Ekpo was listed among Nigeria's 100 Most Inspiring Women by Leading Ladies Africa, which cited her work with The Discovery Centre and The Blueprint of How.

== Global Knowledge Festival and Global Knowledge Centre ==
In 2026, Ekpo founded and convened the Global Knowledge Festival, a multidisciplinary gathering focused on knowledge, leadership, innovation, culture and human development. The inaugural edition, themed “The Convergence,” was held in Uyo, Akwa Ibom State, from 17 to 20 September 2026. It represented an expansion of The Blueprint of How from a travelling seminar and conversation platform into a larger destination-based festival.

The festival brought together participants from fields including business, leadership, entrepreneurship, education, media, entertainment and social development. Its programme included discussions and activities relating to knowledge exchange, leadership, innovation, culture and human development.

A major component of the 2026 festival was the commissioning of the Global Knowledge Centre in Uyo. The centre was conceived as a permanent hub for knowledge, learning, discovery, leadership engagement and human development. Several Nigerian media organisations reported that the organisers described it as Africa's first Global Knowledge Centre.

The commissioning attracted public figures including Umo Eno, governor of Akwa Ibom State; Richard Mofe-Damijo; Olori Atuwatse III; Gabriel Ogbechie; Busola Tejumola; Nike Adeyemi; Adebola Williams; Chude Jideonwo; Ini Edo; and Tunde Onakoya, among others.

The festival and centre represented a further development of Ekpo's work through The Discovery Centre and The Blueprint of How, moving from seminars and leadership conversations towards a permanent physical platform for knowledge exchange and collaboration.

== Awards and recognition ==
In 2014, Ekpo was selected for President Barack Obama's Young African Leaders Initiative and was subsequently involved with the Mandela Washington Fellowship's regional advisory structure. She was also appointed an honorary citizen and Goodwill Ambassador of Arkansas.

In 2017, Leading Ladies Africa named Ekpo among its list of influential and inspiring women in Nigeria. The organisation again included her among its 2023 list of 100 Most Inspiring Women.

In 2025, the University of Southampton presented Ekpo with its Outstanding Contribution Alumni Award. Mfon Ekpo joins the ranks of the University of Southampton’s most distinguished alumni, a list that includes trailblazers like Sir Tim Berners-Lee, inventor of the World Wide Web, and Adrian Newey, the legendary Formula 1 engineer and designer. The award recognised her work in leadership development, civic engagement and social impact.

Mfon Ekpo, was announced as a member of the 2026 Faculty for the Elevate Africa Fellowship (EAF), a prestigious pan-African leadership programme convening some of the continent’s most promising mid-career leaders.

== Public Talks ==
Mfon is a frequent John Maxwell speaker and trainer. She has delivered talks at the SME-Support Clinic, on "Technology -The Fulcrum of New Age SMEs in Africa", as part of Social Media Week 2015 (SMWLagos).

Ekpo has spoken on leadership, entrepreneurship, personal development and organisational development at conferences, universities and professional programmes. Her speaking engagements have included the University of Oxford, Yale University, Harvard University, Howard University and the University of Southampton, according to profiles published by the University of Southampton and The Discovery Centre.

At Harvard University, she was featured as a distinguished speaker at the 6th Annual Women in Power Conference (WIPC) hosted at the Harvard Kennedy School, addressing global governance, intersectional leadership, and women's empowerment alongside international leaders including Sheryl Sandberg.

She has also participated in leadership and entrepreneurship programmes in Nigeria and internationally and has served as a mentor on entrepreneurship and leadership initiatives.

She has also served as a keynote speaker and convener across multiple editions of The Blueprint of How seminar series and the inaugural Global Knowledge Festival in 2026.

Mfon Ekpo delivered a powerful address at the 2026 International Women’s Day celebration held on 7 March 2026 at the Godswill Akpabio International Stadium in Uyo, Akwa Ibom State, speaking before an audience of approximately 50,000 people gathered to mark the global observance.

In addition to her speaking engagements, Mfon Ekpo Joins Vice President Mahamadu Bawumia, Others for Harvard’s Africa Development Conference 2023 and served as a mentor for various youth, entrepreneurship, and executive leadership initiatives across Africa, Europe, and the United States.
