= Midwives Service Scheme =

Nigerian health service

The Midwives Service Scheme (MSS) is a national health initiative launched by the Federal Government of Nigeria in 2009. It aims to address the high maternal and child mortality rates in the country by deploying skilled midwives to rural communities where access to healthcare services is limited. The program is overseen by the National Primary Health Care Development Agency (NPHCDA) under the Federal Ministry of Health.

== Background ==
Nigeria has one of the highest rates of maternal and infant mortality in the world. According to the World Health Organization (WHO), many of these deaths are preventable with the presence of trained healthcare professionals during pregnancy and childbirth. In response to these challenges, the MSS was introduced as a human resources for health intervention aimed at improving maternal, newborn, and child health (MNCH) outcomes, especially in underserved rural areas.

== Objectives ==
The core objectives of the MSS include:

- Increasing access to skilled birth attendance in rural and underserved communities.
- Reducing maternal, newborn, and child mortality.
- Strengthening the primary health care system in Nigeria.
- Creating employment opportunities for midwives and community health workers.

== Structure and implementation ==
The MSS was designed as a collaborative initiative between the Federal Government, State Governments, and Local Government Areas (LGAs). The scheme recruits newly qualified, unemployed, and retired midwives who are deployed to Primary Health Care Centres (PHCs) in selected rural areas across the country.

Each participating PHC typically receives a team comprising:

- Four midwives
- One community health extension worker (CHEW)
- One health assistant

These healthcare personnel are rotated quarterly to maintain coverage and manage fatigue. The federal government is responsible for paying the stipends of the midwives, while the state and local governments provide accommodation and other logistical support.

== Achievements ==
Since its inception, the MSS has contributed to:

- Improved access to antenatal care and skilled delivery services in rural areas.
- Increased utilization of maternal and child health services.
- Reduced maternal and neonatal mortality in participating communities.
- Strengthened human resources for health at the primary level.

== Challenges ==
Despite its successes, the scheme has faced several challenges, including:

- Inconsistent funding and delayed payment of stipends.
- Poor infrastructure in some health facilities.
- Lack of proper monitoring and evaluation mechanisms.
- Irregular commitment from some state and local governments.

== Reforms and continuity ==
In subsequent years, there have been calls for the restructuring and strengthening of the MSS to ensure sustainability and effectiveness. The Nigerian government, in collaboration with development partners such as UNICEF, WHO, and the World Bank, continues to explore ways to improve the scheme and align it with the broader objectives of Universal Health Coverage (UHC) and the Sustainable Development Goals (SDGs).

== See also ==
- Healthcare in Nigeria
- Maternal health
- National Primary Health Care Development Agency
- Sustainable Development Goal 3
