= Adamu Abdullahi Atterwahmie =

Nigerian Consultant Obstetrician and Gynecologist

Adamu Abdullahi Atterwahmie (born 1970) is a Nigerian consultant obstetrician and gynecologist and a healthcare administrator. He is currently the Chief Medical Director of Federal Medical Centre, Birnin Kudu, Jigawa State.
