= Health law in Nigeria =

Health law in Nigeria refers to the legal framework that governs healthcare delivery, medical ethics, public health policies, and the rights and responsibilities of healthcare providers and patients. It encompasses legislation, regulations, and case law that guide the administration of healthcare services, the protection of public health, and the enforcement of medical standards.

The legal framework for health law in Nigeria is derived from various sources, including the 1999 Constitution of the Federal Republic of Nigeria, statutory laws, international treaties, and common law principles.

== Legislations governing health law in Nigeria ==
- The 1999 Constitution of Nigeria: serves as the supreme legal document governing all aspects of governance, including the protection of fundamental human rights. One of the most critical provisions related to healthcare is Section 33, which guarantees the right to life. This provision implies that the government has a responsibility to ensure that citizens have access to healthcare services necessary for preserving life. While the Constitution does not explicitly declare healthcare as a fundamental right, it indirectly places an obligation on the government to protect citizens from life-threatening conditions, including diseases, epidemics, and poor medical infrastructure. Section 17(3)(d) of the Constitution mandates the government to provide adequate medical and health facilities for all persons, reinforcing the state's role in safeguarding public health. Beyond individual rights, the Directive Principles of State Policy (Chapter II) emphasize the government's duty to ensure the well-being of its citizens by providing essential healthcare services. However, these directives are not legally enforceable, meaning citizens cannot sue the government for failing to provide healthcare. Nonetheless, these constitutional provisions form the foundation for subsequent healthcare policies and laws in Nigeria, shaping initiatives like the National Health Act (2014) and the National Health Insurance Authority Act (2022). By recognizing the relationship between health and the right to life, the Constitution provides a legal basis for advocating improved healthcare access, particularly for marginalized and vulnerable populations.
- The National Health Act (NHA) 2014: is one of Nigeria’s most comprehensive legal frameworks for healthcare delivery. It defines the responsibilities of federal, state, and local governments in providing healthcare services and establishes guidelines for both public and private healthcare facilities. One of the Act’s most significant provisions is the creation of the Basic Healthcare Provision Fund (BHCPF), which allocates at least 1% of the federal revenue to primary healthcare services. This fund is used to finance essential healthcare needs, particularly for vulnerable populations such as pregnant women, children, and the elderly. The Act also specifies the rights of patients, including the right to emergency medical treatment, informed consent, and privacy in healthcare settings. The National Health Act regulates professional standards within the medical field. It mandates the registration and licensing of healthcare providers and outlines strict penalties for professional misconduct. Furthermore, the Act strengthens health system regulation by setting national health standards, ensuring quality control in hospitals, and promoting public-private partnerships in healthcare delivery. By addressing financial barriers, regulatory gaps, and ethical concerns, the NHA 2014 plays a crucial role in improving Nigeria’s healthcare system and making medical services more accessible and efficient for citizens.
- The Public Health Act: is a legislative framework designed to regulate public health emergencies, disease control, and environmental health in Nigeria. This law gives the government the authority to take immediate actions during epidemics and pandemics, such as imposing quarantines, enforcing mass vaccinations, and implementing sanitation measures. The Act outlines the responsibilities of health agencies and local governments in preventing and managing infectious diseases, ensuring that public health threats are effectively contained. It also mandates the reporting of communicable diseases to prevent widespread outbreaks and protect communities from health hazards. Beyond emergency response, the Public Health Act also covers issues related to sanitation, waste disposal, and food safety. It establishes legal requirements for clean water supply, air quality control, and proper sewage management, recognizing the connection between environmental conditions and overall public health. The Act also empowers regulatory agencies to inspect food production and distribution processes, preventing contamination and ensuring consumer safety. By addressing both immediate health threats and long-term environmental factors, the Public Health Act plays a crucial role in promoting public health security and disease prevention across Nigeria.
- The Medical and Dental Practitioners Act: is the primary legislation governing the licensing, regulation, and professional conduct of doctors and dentists in Nigeria. This Act established the Medical and Dental Council of Nigeria (MDCN), which is responsible for accrediting medical and dental schools, certifying practitioners, and enforcing disciplinary measures against those who violate professional ethics. The Act ensures that only qualified individuals can practice medicine and dentistry by requiring mandatory registration and periodic licensing renewals. Any practitioner who fails to meet these standards risks suspension or permanent revocation of their license. The Act also emphasizes ethical medical practice, ensuring that doctors adhere to principles such as patient confidentiality, informed consent, and non-maleficence (do no harm). In cases of medical negligence or malpractice, the MDCN has the authority to investigate complaints and impose sanctions, including fines, suspensions, or permanent disqualification from practice. By maintaining high standards for education, licensing, and ethical conduct, the Medical and Dental Practitioners Act safeguards patients' rights and enhances the overall quality of healthcare in Nigeria.
- The Pharmacists Council of Nigeria (PCN) Act: is responsible for the regulation of pharmacy practice and pharmaceutical products in Nigeria. This law establishes the Pharmacy Council of Nigeria (PCN), which oversees the registration, licensing, and supervision of pharmacists to ensure compliance with professional and ethical standards. The Act mandates that all pharmacies must be operated by licensed professionals to prevent the sale of counterfeit or substandard drugs. It also sets standards for pharmacy education and continuous professional development, ensuring that pharmacists remain updated on industry best practices. In addition to professional regulation, the Act includes provisions for drug safety and quality control. It collaborates with agencies such as NAFDAC to enforce laws on prescription drug sales, counterfeit drug prevention, and pharmaceutical ethics. This regulatory framework helps protect public health by ensuring that medications are effective, safe, and legally approved before reaching consumers. By enforcing strict guidelines on pharmacy operations, the Pharmacists Council of Nigeria Act plays a critical role in safeguarding public health and ensuring responsible pharmaceutical practices.
- The NAFDAC Act establishes the National Agency for Food and Drug Administration and Control (NAFDAC), which is responsible for regulating and controlling the manufacturing, distribution, and sale of food, drugs, medical devices, and cosmetics in Nigeria. One of its primary functions is to ensure that drugs and food products meet safety and quality standards before they reach the public. The agency conducts laboratory tests, market surveillance, and product registration to prevent the distribution of counterfeit or harmful products. NAFDAC also has legal authority to investigate and prosecute manufacturers who violate drug safety regulations. It plays a key role in public health education, warning consumers about fake drugs, contaminated food, and unsafe medical products. The agency enforces strict regulations to protect consumers from harmful substances, ensuring that pharmaceutical and food products adhere to international safety standards. Through continuous monitoring and enforcement, the NAFDAC Act helps maintain public confidence in the safety and efficacy of consumable products.
- The National Health Insurance Authority (NHIA) Act (2022) is a landmark reform that establishes mandatory health insurance coverage for all Nigerians. This Act replaces the previous National Health Insurance Scheme (NHIS), which was voluntary and had limited coverage. By making health insurance compulsory, the new law aims to provide universal healthcare access, reducing out-of-pocket medical expenses. The NHIA works with employers, government agencies, and private insurance providers to create a structured health insurance system accessible to all citizens. The Act includes provisions for subsidized healthcare for vulnerable groups, such as low in come earners, children, pregnant women, and the elderly. The NHIA also establishes health insurance funds to ensure financial sustainability and prevent hospitals from rejecting patients due to lack of funds. By promoting financial protection and improved access to healthcare, this Act is a major step toward achieving universal health coverage in Nigeria.
