= Gabriel Ogbechie =

Nigerian businessman

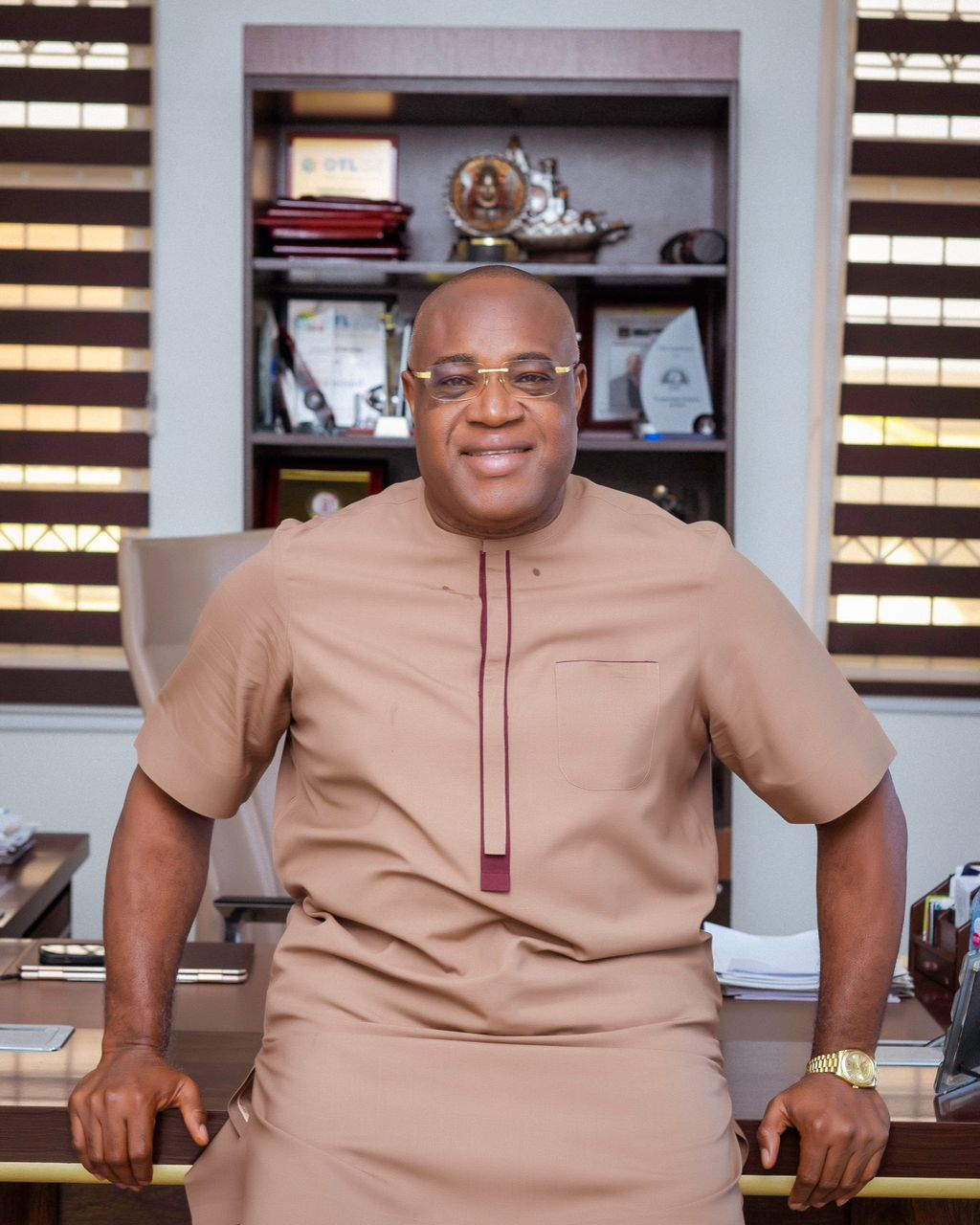
- Born: 28 May 1966 (age 59); Lagos, Nigeria.
- Education: Bachelor of Science (BSc), Production Engineering. University of Benin
- Occupation: Business Executive
- Years active: 1997–present
- Known for: Rainoil Limited
- Title: Founder and Group Managing Director of Rainoil
- Spouse: Godrey Ogbechie
- Children: 3
- Awards: Vanguard Media Business Man of the Year, 2023

Gabriel Ogbechie (OON) (born 28 May 1966) is a Nigerian Billionaire businessman and philanthropist who founded the Rainoil Group, one of Nigeria's largest indigenous oil and gas company.

== Early life and education ==
Ogbechie hails from Idumuje Ugboko in Aniocha North Local Government Area of Delta state and was born to an average home and the fifth of six children. He attended Queen of the Niger Primary School, Onitsha, and St. Patrick's College, Asaba, after which he proceeded to the University of Benin (Nigeria), where he obtained a Bachelor of Science (B.Sc.) degree in Production Engineering.

Gabriel Ogbechie is a pioneer member of the Lagos Business School Owner Manager Programme 2002 and an alumnus of the Harvard Business School’s 57th Owner/President Management Programme. In 2016, he was awarded an Honorary Doctorate (D.Sc.) in Technology Management by Novena University, Ogume, Delta State.

== Career ==
=== Early career ===
Ogbechie began his career working in an Accounting firm before landing his first job as a Sales Operations Manager in the oil and gas industry in the early 1990s.

=== Rainoil Limited ===
In 1997, Ogbechie founded Rainoil Limited. The downstream oil and gas company owns three state-of-the-art petroleum product storage depots, strategically located across Nigeria. These depots, each with a substantial 50 million litre capacity, are situated in Oghara, Delta State; Calabar, Cross River State; and Ijegun Egba, Lagos State. In addition to its storage facilities, Rainoil Limited manages a network of over 200 retail petrol stations and LPG plants across Nigeria. The company has a fleet of more than 400 petroleum product tank trucks for efficient distribution to its network of stations and customers.

In December 2017, Rainoil announced the annual Rainoil Tennis Open in partnership with the Nigerian Tennis Federation. Ogbechie revealed that the objective of Rainoil bankrolling a national open tournament was to pave way for an international tournament that would see stars from various parts of the world come to play in Nigeria.

=== Preline Limited ===
In October 2021, Ogbechie's Preline Limited acquired a controlling stake in Eterna PLC, a company quoted on the Nigerian Stock Exchange, thereby making him the Chairman of the Eterna PLC board of directors.

== Philanthropy ==
Through the establishment of the Gabriel Ogbechie Foundation, he has been involved in many philanthropic causes particularly in Delta State, where he provides scholarships to undergraduates, community healthcare services as well as youth employment initiatives.

In 2019, during the COVID-19 pandemic in Nigeria, Ogbechie donated ambulances and other medical equipment to the Federal Medical Centre, Asaba to support the fight against the virus in the country.

== Controversy ==
In December 2020, Ogbechie was accused in a public statement released by his fellow kinsman and Billionaire Ned Nwoko of plotting against him. Ogbechie has since denied the allegations. On November 30, 2022, the Nigerian Police Force, following its investigations submitted to the Federal High Court in Abuja a report clearing Ogbechie of complicity in the alleged assassination plot. Ogbechie has filed a one billion naira suit against Ned Nwoko for defamation of character.

== Awards and recognition ==
In 2018, Ogbechie was named the Downstream Man of the Year at the annual Oil Trading and Logistics Conference which was held in Lagos, Nigeria. On October 11, 2022, in Abuja, Ogbechie was conferred with the honour of Officer of the Order of the Niger (OON) by the Federal Government of Nigeria under the administration of President Muhammadu Buhari.

== Personal life ==
Ogbechie is married to Godrey Ogbechie and both have three children.
