= Healthcare in Nigeria =

Life expectancy at birth in Nigeria

Healthcare in Nigeria is a concurrent responsibility of the three tiers of government in the country. Private providers of healthcare in have a visible role to play in healthcare delivery in Nigeria. The use of traditional medicine (TM) and complementary and alternative medicine (CAM) has increased significantly over the past few years.

Healthcare delivery in Nigeria has experienced progressive deterioration as a result of under-investment by successive governments, to effectively solve several problems that have existed in the sector over many years. This directly impacts the productivity of citizens and Nigeria's economic growth by extension. As of February 2018, the country was ranked 187 out of 191 countries in the world, in assessing the level of compliance with Universal Health Coverage (UHC), as very little of the populace is health insured, whereas even government budget for health services is insignificant. Out-of-pocket payments for health causes households to incur huge expenditures. Private expenditure on health as a percentage of total health expenditure is 74.85%.

The implication of this is that government expenditure for health is only 5.03 percent of all the money spent on health across the nation. Of the percentage spent on health by the citizens (74.85%), about 70% is spent as out-of-pocket expenditure to pay for access to health services in both government and private facilities. Most of the remaining money spent by citizens on their health is spent on procuring 'alternatives'. Low wages and poor workplace culture have forced hundreds of thousands of them to flee to Europe and America. However, considering its size and population, there are fewer health workers per unit population than are required to provide effective health services to the entire nation. The most common reason is the brain drain of health professionals in other countries, especially in Europe and America.

Nigeria's health department operates within a multi tiered structure designed to provide medical services at various levels. The healthcare system is broadly categorized into primary, secondary, and tertiary levels, each serving distinct functions within the country's health sector. The Ministry of Health oversees the coordination and regulation of healthcare services, ensuring accessibility, quality, and efficiency.

== Health infrastructure ==
The federal government's role is mostly limited to coordinating the affairs of the university teaching hospitals, Federal Medical Centres (tertiary healthcare) while the state government manages the various general hospitals (secondary healthcare) and the local government focuses on dispensaries (primary healthcare), which are regulated by the federal government through the NPHCDA.

The total expenditure on healthcare as a percentage of GDP is 5.03, while the percentage of federal government expenditure on healthcare is about 1.5%. A long-run indicator of the ability of the country to provide food sustenance and avoid malnutrition is the rate of growth of per capita food production; from 1970 to 1990, the rate for Nigeria was 0.25%.

On December 12, 2023, key health sector stakeholders signed a new health sector renewal compact by all relevant stakeholders, including the federal and state governments, donors, and development partners, also known as the first Sector-wide Approach (SWAp) in the health sector in Nigeria, introduced by the Coordinating Minister for Health and Social Welfare Muhammad Pate.

In 2024, the Nigerian government held its first quarterly dialogue on the performance of the health sector across the country between the federal authorities and sub-national governments, and key stakeholders in the health sector. The dialogue was organised as a part of the nation's commitment to revamping the health system using the Health Sector Renewal Investment Initiative and the Sector-Wide Approach, backed by the National Health Act of 2014.

=== Primary Healthcare Centres (PHCs) ===
Primary Healthcare Centres (PHCs) serve as the foundation of Nigeria's healthcare system, providing basic medical services and preventive care. They are typically located in rural and semi urban areas to ensure accessibility for underserved populations.

==== Functions ====
- Immunization programs
- Maternal and child health services
- Health education and awareness campaigns
- Treatment of common illnesses and minor injuries
- Nutrition and family planning services

PHCs are managed by local government authorities with support from the state and federal governments, as well as international health organizations.

=== Secondary Healthcare Facilities ===
General hospitals fall under the category of secondary healthcare facilities and serve as referral centers for cases that cannot be handled at PHCs. These hospitals are present in urban and semi-urban areas, providing specialized care and advanced medical interventions.

==== Functions of General Hospitals ====
- Emergency medical care
- Diagnostic services such as laboratory tests and imaging
- Surgical procedures
- Specialized treatments in fields like pediatrics, gynecology, and internal medicine
- Outpatient and inpatient services

General hospitals are managed by state governments and often receive federal funding and technical support.

=== Online databases of healthcare providers ===
- The official body that registers doctors and dentists, the Medical and Dental Council of Nigeria, does not have an online register. They provide a service to confirm a doctor's status.
- The Pharmacists Council of Nigeria allows for searching for verified pharmacists and premises.
- Medpages: Healthcare providers by category and region. Search allows finding of providers by name or specialty.

=== Health insurance ===
Historically, health insurance in Nigeria could be applied to a few instances: free health care provided and financed for all citizens, health care provided by the government through a special health insurance scheme for government employees and private firms entering contracts with private health care providers. However, there are few people who fall within the three instances; as of 2015 less than 5% of Nigerians have health insurance coverage.

In May 1999, the government created the National Health Insurance Scheme, encompassing government employees, the organized private sector and the informal sector. Legislatively the scheme also covers children under five, permanently disabled persons and prison inmates. In 2004, the administration of President Olusegun Obasanjo gave more legislative powers to the scheme with positive amendments to the original 1999 legislative act. 1.5 percent of Nigerians have been covered by the National Health Insurance Scheme since its establishment. In 2017, the House of Representatives Committee on Health Care Services in Abuja, organized a two-day investigative hearing; where the Minister of Health Isaac Folorunsho Adewole said that the sum of N351 billion had been expended on health management organizations without commensurate result.

On May 19, 2022, President Muhammadu Buhari signed the National Health Insurance Authority Bill 2022 into law "to ensure coverage of 83 million poor Nigerians who cannot afford to pay premiums as recommended by the Lancet Nigeria Commission". This law "repealed the National Health Insurance Scheme Act, Cap N42, Laws of the Federation of Nigeria 2004". In 2024, the National Health Insurance Authority (NHIA) announced an increase in healthcare costs, introducing a 60% rise in capitation and a 40% adjustment in Fee-For-Service (FFS) fees, reportedly due to healthcare cost inflation and the need to maintain quality of care, even as the adjustment could also impose a financial strain on patients and employers.

There is immense private sector participation in the scheme with HMOs like Health Partners HMO, Total Health Trust, Police HMO, Clearline HMO, Multi Shield Nigeria, Expatcare Health International, Oceanic Health Management and Zuma Health Trust.

In 2024, the Federal Government reportedly disbursed a total of N37billion to relevant health agencies through the Basic Health Care Provision Fund (BHCPF) for designated Primary Health Care (PHC) facilities.

Over one million Nigerians are pushed into poverty every year due to health-related expenses, according to a World Bank Human Capital Public Expenditure Review and Institutional Review.

=== Bone marrow surgeries ===
A new bone marrow donor program, the second in Africa, opened in 2012. In cooperation with the University of Nigeria, it collects DNA swabs from people who might want to help a person with leukemia, lymphoma, or sickle cell disease to find a compatible donor for a life-saving bone marrow transplant. It hopes to expand to include cord blood donations in the future.

=== Cancer care ===
Symptoms of cancer metastasis

Cancer care in Nigeria is at a critical crossroads, as the country faces a rising tide of cancer related illnesses with limited resources to combat them. About 80,000 Nigerians die of cancer annually and over 100,000 are diagnosed with cancer annually. More people are dying of cancer in Nigeria because cancer and non-communicable diseases are not given priority in the country's health budget. There are only seven cancer radiotherapy centers in Nigeria. The future of cancer care in Nigeria depends on collective action, increased funding, and stronger awareness campaigns to ensure early detection and accessible treatment for all.

Many of the cancer-related deaths in Nigeria can be attributed to a lack of knowledge regarding this family of diseases. For example, women are not provided with sufficient guidance to identify the signs and symptoms of breast cancer, and healthcare providers lack the capability to diagnose breast cancer, even after women have actively sought medical examinations.

Moreover, the absence of sufficient knowledge regarding both the prevention and early detection of cancer, coupled with a societal environment that can promote silence and attaches a negative social stigma to such illnesses, has resulted in over 33% of avoidable cancer fatalities. Research showed that many women with breast cancer had their needs met in less scientific and indirect ways. Some believed that breast cancer could be the fault of evil spirits and many women chose to use a complementary and alternative medicine alongside standard treatment.

==== Types ====
Cancer is a significant health issue in Nigeria, with breast cancer, cervical cancer, prostate cancer, and liver cancer being the most common types. According to the World Health Organization (WHO), cancer cases in Nigeria have been rising, with thousands of new diagnoses annually. The lack of a comprehensive cancer registry poses a challenge to precise data collection, but estimates indicate that Nigeria bears one of the highest cancer burdens in Africa.

==== Challenges ====
- Limited Healthcare Infrastructure: Nigeria has an insufficient number of specialized cancer treatment centers, with most of them concentrated in major cities such as Lagos, Abuja, and Ibadan. This urban centric distribution makes it extremely difficult for people in rural areas to access timely and adequate cancer care. The lack of well equipped oncology units in general hospitals further worsens the situation, as patients often need to travel long distances for diagnosis and treatment. In some cases, delays in referrals and long waiting times at overburdened centers lead to disease progression before treatment begins.
- High Cost of Treatment: Cancer treatment is prohibitively expensive for many Nigerians. The costs of chemotherapy, radiotherapy, surgery, and other medical interventions are beyond the financial reach of most patients. This issue is compounded by the fact that Nigeria's National Health Insurance Scheme (NHIS) covers only a small fraction of the population, leaving most cancer patients to pay out of pocket. As a result, many individuals either abandon treatment midway due to financial constraints or resort to alternative treatments that may be ineffective.
- Late Diagnosis: One of the biggest contributors to poor cancer outcomes in Nigeria is the high rate of late stage diagnosis. Many patients seek medical attention only when symptoms have become severe, reducing the chances of successful treatment. This problem stems from a combination of factors, including inadequate cancer screening programs, lack of routine health check-ups, cultural and religious beliefs, and fear of the disease. Additionally, many primary healthcare providers lack the training to detect early signs of cancer, leading to misdiagnoses or delays in referrals to specialists.
- Shortage of Oncologists and Specialists: Nigeria faces a severe shortage of healthcare professionals trained in oncology. The number of oncologists, radiologists, pathologists, and oncology nurses is far below the recommended ratio needed to manage the increasing number of cancer cases. Many medical professionals who specialize in cancer care leave the country for better opportunities abroad, exacerbating the brain drain issue. This shortage means that the few available specialists are overworked, leading to long appointment wait times and reduced quality of care for patients.
- Limited Public Awareness: A significant proportion of the Nigerian population lacks basic knowledge about cancer, its risk factors, symptoms, and the importance of early detection. Myths and misconceptions about cancer, such as the belief that it is caused by spiritual forces or that it is a death sentence with no cure, discourage people from seeking medical help. Additionally, there is limited government-led public health education on cancer prevention, and awareness campaigns are not widespread or consistent. This lack of awareness results in low screening rates, unhealthy lifestyle choices, and delays in seeking medical intervention.

==== Treatment center ====
- National Hospital Abuja: The National Hospital Abuja is one of Nigeria's leading cancer treatment centers, equipped with modern radiotherapy facilities, chemotherapy units, and a dedicated oncology department. The hospital has highly trained specialists, including oncologists, radiologists, and surgical oncologists. It provides comprehensive cancer care, including diagnostics, treatment, and palliative care. However, due to high demand, patients often experience long waiting times for radiotherapy and other treatments.
- Lagos University Teaching Hospital (LUTH): Located in Lagos, LUTH is one of the most well-equipped cancer treatment centers in Nigeria. It offers chemotherapy, radiotherapy, and surgical oncology services. The hospital has a cancer research unit that focuses on improving cancer treatment outcomes in Nigeria. In recent years, LUTH has upgraded its radiotherapy facilities, making it one of the few centers in the country with functional linear accelerators for advanced radiation therapy. Despite these advancements, access to treatment remains a challenge due to high patient volume.
- University College Hospital (UCH), Ibadan: As one of Nigeria's oldest and most prestigious medical institutions, UCH Ibadan has a well-established oncology department that provides diagnosis, chemotherapy, and radiotherapy services. The hospital also plays a significant role in cancer research and medical training. UCH has collaborated with international organizations to improve its cancer care services, although equipment maintenance and funding remain key challenges.
- Ahmadu Bello University Teaching Hospital (ABUTH), Zaria: ABUTH Zaria is another major center for cancer diagnosis and treatment in northern Nigeria. It provides chemotherapy, radiotherapy, and surgical oncology services. The hospital serves a large population from the northern region, where access to specialized cancer care is particularly limited. The need for improved infrastructure and increased funding for equipment maintenance is a major concern at ABUTH.
- Federal Medical Centre, Asaba: Federal Medical Centre (FMC) Asaba has integrated cancer treatment into its medical programs, offering chemotherapy and other cancer-related treatments. While not as well-equipped as the major teaching hospitals, FMC Asaba plays a crucial role in providing cancer care to patients in the South-South region of Nigeria. Like many other cancer centers in the country, it faces challenges such as inadequate funding, limited oncologists, and outdated treatment facilities.

==== NGOs actively involved in cancer care ====
- CancerAware Nigeria – Focuses on breast and cervical cancer awareness and screening.
- Project Pink Blue – Engages in cancer advocacy, patient support, and fundraising for treatment.
- Breast Cancer Association of Nigeria (BRECAN) – A leading organization in breast cancer awareness and education.

=== Mental health ===
The majority of mental health services are provided by 8 regional psychiatric centers and psychiatric departments and medical schools of 12 major universities. A few general hospitals also provide mental health services. The formal centers often face competition from native herbalists and faith healing centres.

The ratio of psychologists and social workers is 0.02 to 100,000.

== Issues ==
Despite the structured health system, Nigeria's healthcare sector faces numerous challenges that hinder effective service delivery. These challenges affect both urban and rural populations, limiting access to quality care and exacerbating public health concerns.

=== Regulation of pharmaceuticals ===
In 1989 legislation made effective a list of essential drugs. The regulation was also meant to limit the manufacture and import of fake or sub-standard drugs and to curtail false advertising. However, the section on essential drugs was later amended. In 2005, it was estimated that about 16.7% of pharmaceutical drugs in the country were counterfeit. In 2012, a new study concluded that the proportion had fallen to 6.4%, of which 19.6% were Anti-Malaria medicines. In 2014 that had fallen to 3.6%. About N29 billion worth of counterfeit drugs were destroyed between 2015 – 2017.

Drug quality is primarily controlled by the National Agency for Food and Drug Administration and Control. The agency has established a Mobile Authentication Service. A team of girls from the Regina Pacis Secondary School in Onitsha devised a better technological solution, an app called the FD Detector which uses barcode technology to verify drug authenticity and expiration dates. This won them a place in the Technovation Challenge 2018.

Several major regulatory failures have produced international scandals:

- In 1993, adulterated paracetamol syrup entered into the healthcare system in Oyo and Benue State, the result was the death of 100 children. A year after the disaster, batches containing poisonous ethylene glycol, the major cause of the deaths, could still be purchased.
- In 1996, 11 children died after a clinical trial by Pfizer involving the drugs trovafloxacin and ceftriaxone during a meningitis outbreak.
- In 2008–2009, at least 84 children died from a brand of contaminated teething medication.

In 2024, the Coordinating Minister of Health and Social Welfare, Prof Muhammad Pate, lamented the pervasive corruption in the health sector and the country at large, such as a case where therapeutic food donated for children was diverted and the matter reported to police.

=== Access to medicines ===
Nigeria is heavily reliant on the import of medicines as well as the import of ingredients required for local medicine production. In 2023, the pharmaceutical companies GlaxoSmithKline and Sanofi ceased their local drug manufacturing, citing various operational challenges. In 2024, amidst a record 27-year high inflation rate of 28.92% and a significant decline in the value of the Naira, the cost of antibiotics witnessed a more than tenfold increase in price. Other medicines, such as asthma inhalers and diabetic medications, were also significantly affected.

=== Geographic inequality ===
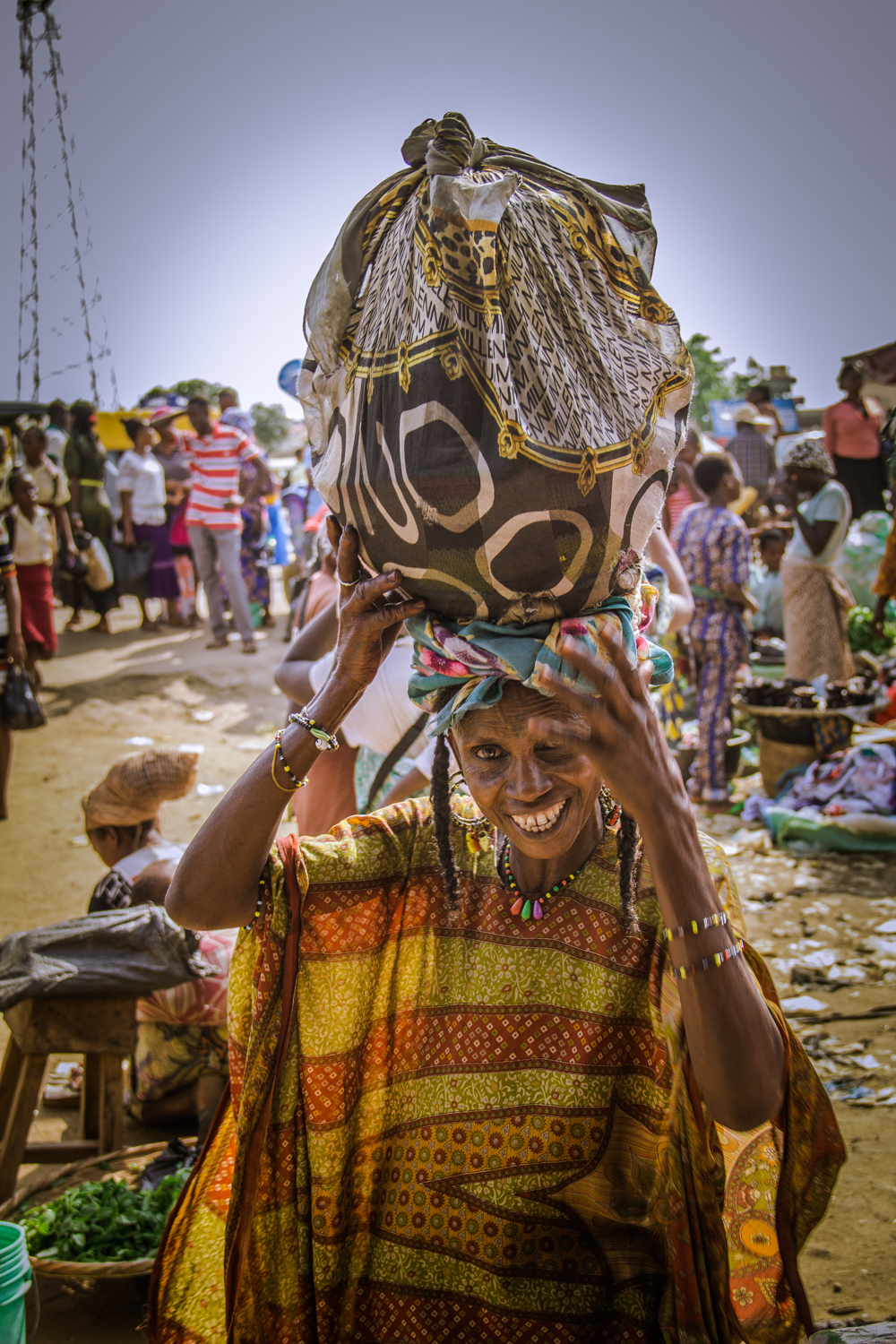
Malian Fulani immigrant selling herbal medicines in a Nigerian market

Healthcare in Nigeria is influenced by different local and regional factors that impact the quality or quantity present in one location. Due to the aforementioned, the healthcare system in Nigeria has shown spatial variation in terms of availability and quality of facilities in relation to need. However, this is largely a result of the level of state and local government involvement and investment in healthcare programs and education. Also, the Nigerian Ministry of Health usually spends about 70% of its budget in urban areas where around 50% of the population resides.

Access to quality healthcare in Nigeria remains a challenge, especially for rural populations. Poor road networks, long distances to healthcare facilities, and transportation costs prevent many Nigerians from seeking medical attention promptly. Additionally, disparities in the distribution of health facilities mean that while urban areas may have well-equipped hospitals, rural communities often rely on underfunded and poorly staffed primary healthcare centers. The lack of skilled medical personnel in these areas further exacerbates the problem, leading to increased mortality rates from preventable and treatable conditions. Programs such as mobile health clinics and telemedicine initiatives have been introduced to improve healthcare access in remote regions, but widespread implementation remains limited.

The challenges facing Nigeria's healthcare system require urgent policy reforms, increased government investment, and strategic partnerships to improve funding, infrastructure, and personnel retention. Without addressing these key issues, achieving Universal Health Coverage (UHC) and improving overall health outcomes will remain a difficult task for the country.

=== Emigration of healthcare workers ===
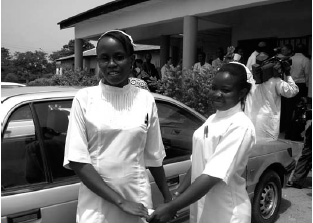
Retaining health care professionals is an important objective

Survey shows looming brain drain in Nigeria's health sector in the rising trend of emigration of healthcare personnel – physicians, pharmacists, nurses, laboratory scientists, physiotherapists and many others have difficulty getting into paid employment. Many fresh doctors, out of medical schools, and managed to get housemanship positions, the situation occurs every year. The problem persists beyond the period of housemanship or internship, when it comes to securing well-deserved employment. There are generally not enough job positions to go around. The challenge of this is clear. The problem of Sk distribution, with the few available personnel being mostly in the urban areas, where almost all the large facilities like General Hospitals and Teaching Hospitals are located. The underlying issues for this may include the political dimension, with some states unwilling to recruit large numbers of workers from other parts of the country as an act of deliberate policy, preferring to employ their own indigenes, or, where there is a short-fall, employ foreigners mostly from North Africa on short-term contracts. In 2007, a National Human Resources for Health Policy was formulated by the Federal Ministry of Health and approved by the National Council on Health. Subsequently, a Human Resource for Health Strategic Plan 2008–2012 was drawn up to guide implementation of the policy at all levels. The ultimate aim was to ensure that adequate numbers of skilled and well-motivated health workers were available and equitably distributed throughout the nation in order to ensure provision of quality health services. The situation appears set to get worse. As the era of Sustainable Development Goals commences and the target of 2030 begins to come into focus, the statistics are far from providing reassurance.

There are 4000 Nigerian doctors practicing in the United States and 8000 practicing in the United Kingdom. Retaining these expensively trained professionals has been identified as an urgent goal. The brain drain cuts across all healthcare professionals; thousands of Nigerian pharmacists and nurses are practicing in the UK and USA as well.

=== Inadequate funding ===
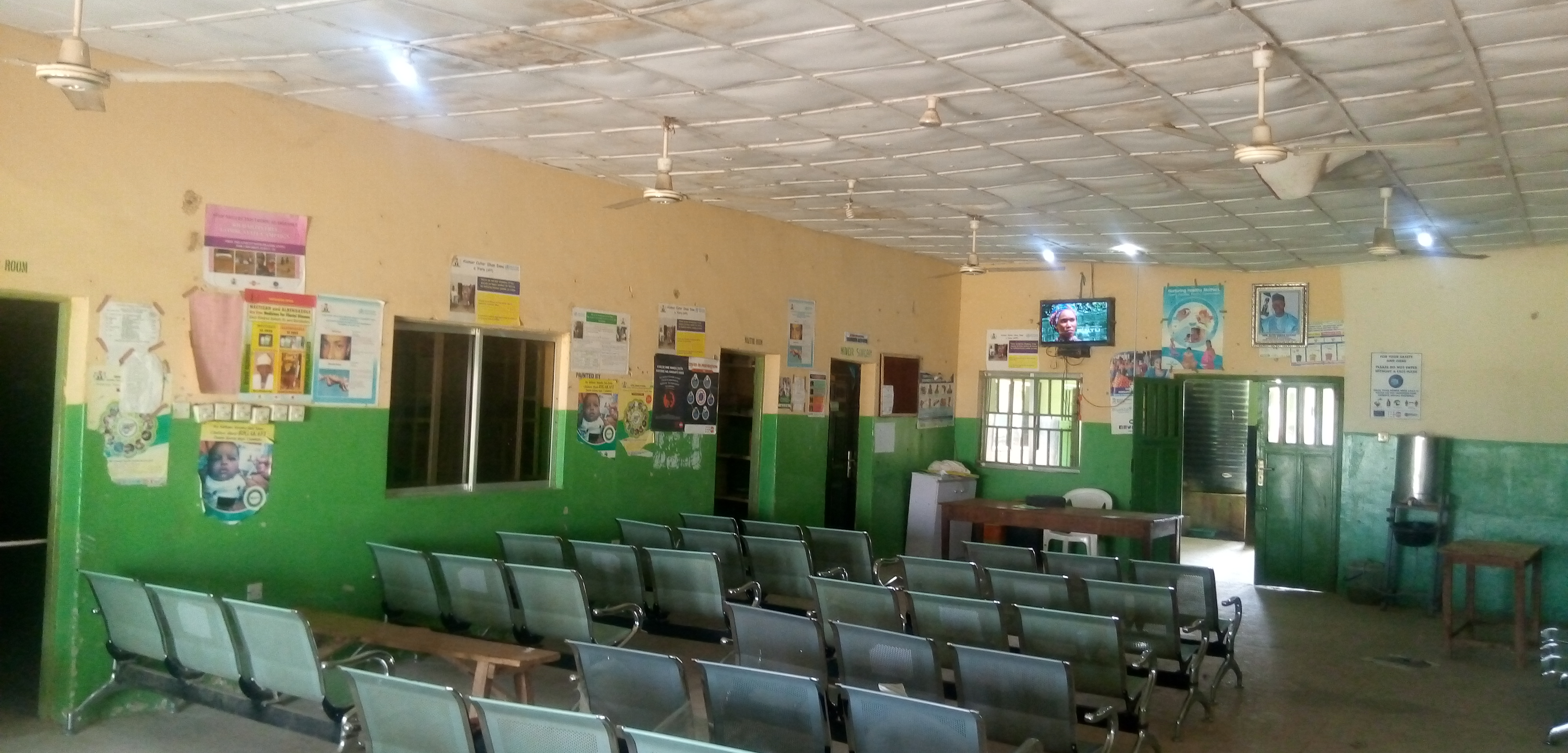
Kagarawal Primary Health Centre 05

One of the most significant barriers to effective healthcare delivery in Nigeria is inadequate funding. The healthcare sector consistently receives a lower budget allocation than the 15% benchmark set by the Abuja Declaration of 2001, where African Union (AU) countries pledged to increase health sector spending. As a result, many health facilities lack the necessary financial resources to provide essential services, procure medical equipment, and maintain infrastructure. The reliance on out-of-pocket expenses for healthcare financing places a heavy burden on individuals, particularly those in low-income and rural communities. Efforts such as the Basic Health Care Provision Fund (BHCPF) aim to improve healthcare financing, but implementation challenges and mismanagement of funds have slowed progress.

Healthcare financing is a mixture of government funding, personal charges, and private/insurance funding. Nigeria has a total of 39914 operational hospitals and clinics and 0.5 hospital beds per 1000 people. It has 0.381 and 1.7 units of doctors and nurses per 1000 people respectively.

The health sector funding of Nigeria is not meeting the African Union commitment of 15% of the total budget to the sector. Unavailability of fund and dwindling economy may have resulted in this. Also, the available scarce funds may not have been used judiciously. The continuous drastic increase in the population of Nigeria, due to a high fertility rate of 4.92 births per woman is adversely affecting the economic and health status of the country also. This is more so due to the triangular dynamic equilibrium between the trios of population, economic and health status. Inadvertently, the continuous increase in population has had an economic impact on, and has led to, inadequate financing of the healthcare sector. A typical example is the stopped free healthcare program of the Osun State government, one of the 36 states in Nigeria, as a result of an economic crisis in 2015. This led to the creation of a Public Private Partnership in the hospital pharmacies of the State.

=== Privatization and commercialization of public health service ===
Public health services in Nigeria are of poor quality and are not adequately available, accessible, and affordable to many people who need these services. The search for solutions has led to the idea of privatization and commercialization of public health services. This development is greatly favored by the idea that it will increase competition and result in the lowering of unit price of health services and make such services more affordable to the poor. However, the argument against it is that privatization and commercialization in Nigeria will be a mirage unless institutional reforms take place.

=== Poor Infrastructure ===
Many healthcare centers and general hospitals in Nigeria suffer from dilapidated infrastructure and outdated medical equipment. Inadequate electricity supply, poor water sanitation, and a lack of functional diagnostic tools limit the effectiveness of medical treatment. Some health facilities operate without basic amenities such as ventilators, incubators, and functional laboratories, making it difficult to handle emergencies and provide specialized care. Tertiary hospitals in major cities such as Lagos, Abuja, and Kano are often overwhelmed due to the failure of primary and secondary healthcare centers to meet patient needs. The government has initiated rehabilitation programs, but progress is slow, and rural areas remain the most affected.

== Patient harm in Nigeria healthcare system ==
The most common forms of harm in Nigeria's healthcare system are harm due to overtreatment and harm due to failure to provide appropriate treatment. Polypharmacy typically represents the harm due to overtreatment. It is not uncommon to see prescriptions containing several medications, five or more. The Beers Criteria and World Health Organization's report on medication safety in polypharmacy is useful in informing the decision of harm due to overtreatment. The Beers Criteria, as a tool, listed potentially harmful drugs (especially in the elderly). Criteria in the Beers Criteria tool has been found wanting in Nigerian healthcare settings. One of the research projects conducted with the tool in Nigeria is the Akande-Sholabi et al. paper which clearly showed that the prevalence of polypharmacy among geriatric patients is almost one in every four patients (23.8%) and the average medications prescribed was found to be 4.

Harm due to failure to provide appropriate treatment, which is a form of medical negligence, can be seen. Though no institutional protocol is available for detecting harm due to failure to provide appropriate treatment in the healthcare setting in Nigeria, discourses, searches and research have shown it is common. A typical example, from experience, is the prescribing of non-steroidal anti-inflammatory drug (NSAID) to a patient with a medical history of peptic ulcer as a result of failure to seek medical history.

Language and culture can also serve as one of the factors responsible for patient harm in Nigeria. It serves as a barrier to accessing health information and ensuring patient safety in some situations. Nigeria is diverse and made up of 371 tribes. A healthcare professional from a particular region that has to be newly introduced and work in another region may face a daunting task in communication with patients. This may harm patient safety. Most times, interpreters are relied on. However, this may be time-consuming and the information may not be perfectly relayed as expected by the healthcare professionals sometimes. To address language and cultural barriers, Slum and Rural Health Initiative (SRHIN), a non-profit organisation based in Nigeria has launched GENSCORE, an AI-powered innovation for mental health screening in Nigerian local languages, including Hausa, Yoruba, and Nigerian Pidgin.

Lengthy patient waiting time is another factor responsible for patient harm in healthcare settings in Nigeria, especially when the waiting periods are undue delay. For instance, a published work on waiting time in the pharmacy department of a tertiary hospital reveals a long delay in care is being experienced by patients. Patients were not satisfied with the undue delay. This is one of the systemic factors that may lead to patient harm due to fatigue experienced by patients while waiting. Suggestion was made that more time should be spent on pharmaceutical counseling and less time on the dispensing process.

=== Effect of non-technical skills on patient safety in Nigeria ===
Non-technical skills are a set of skills of an individual or a team that support learned technical skills. They include cognitive biases, communication and team dynamics. They have had effect on patient safety in the Nigeria healthcare system. As examples, areas where technical skills have had effect on pharmacy practice are explained below.

==== Cognitive biases ====
Cognitive biases have contributed to errors and adverse events in several areas of pharmacy practice. These include decisions in the making of drug formulary, pharmaceutical development, pharmaceutical marketing/sales, conversations with patients, and pharmaceutical counselling, among others.

==== Communication ====
Communication breakdown has threatened patient safety and harmed patients while discharging pharmaceutical services. It has led to medication errors while filling prescriptions, errors while counseling patients on medication use, a threat to patient safety as a result of unresolved disagreement during communication, and harm due to failure to communicate appropriately with patients on safety concerns (side-effects) of drugs, among others.

==== Team dynamics ====
Team dynamics do have impacts on patient safety. For instance, the interprofessional rivalry in the Nigeria healthcare sector has led to strikes in healthcare institutions which left patients in danger. Stress of healthcare professionals have contributed to the degradation of healthcare team performance also. Various sources of stress that have been identified include heavy workload, incivility, dissatisfaction with working conditions, bad leadership and, little reward for work done, among others.

== Human factors in Nigeria's healthcare system ==
Human factors is a discipline that takes into account the abilities and limitations of people in the execution of tasks or completion of assigned work. It recognizes that humans make errors and consider for designing a safe workplace. The discipline is rare to come across in Nigeria's healthcare system and should be implemented. Human factors help see a better way of ensuring safety and quality improvement, in healthcare system and, of patient care. Its focus on fitting the work to the workers rather than fitting the workers to the work is perfectly in order. Fitting the work to the worker is an ideal way of putting the round peg (the right work) in the round hole (to the corresponding abilities of the worker).

Human factor discipline helps create a better design of a system for quality improvement. In a healthcare system, this will improve the quality of care to patients and enhance patient safety. By such designs, the healthcare system will be better equipped to prepare for any unwanted scenario of preventable and/or unnecessary harms to patients and/or the healthcare force.

Human factors/ergonomics (safety science) helps to see quality improvement of health and social care is better achieved by focusing on fitting the work to workers rather than the workers to the work. Getting to know the specific characteristics of each worker, as each worker has different strength and thinking ability, has been recognized as the best way to go in harnessing their potential to the fullness. In addition, the knowledge of the interaction between people and equipment, work environments, and work activities is important for patient safety and quality improvement. This in turn will lead to optimizing human well-being and the healthcare system performance.

== Traditional and alternative medicine ==
As recent reports have shown, in addition to the many benefits there are also risks associated with the different types of traditional medicine /complementary or alternative medicine. Although consumers today have widespread access to various TM/CAM treatments and therapies, they often do not have enough information on what to check when using TM/CAM in order to avoid unnecessary harm. While traditional medicine has a lot to contribute to the health and economy, much harm has resulted from the unregulated sale and misuse of traditional/alternative medicine and herbs in the country and has delayed patients' seeking professional healthcare.

== Government efforts and reforms ==
The Nigerian government, in collaboration with international health organizations, has undertaken several initiatives to improve healthcare services. These include,

=== National Health Insurance Scheme (NHIS) ===
The National Health Insurance Scheme (NHIS) is a government initiative established to improve healthcare accessibility and affordability for Nigerian citizens. The scheme was launched in 1999 and became operational in 2005 under the National Health Insurance Scheme Act, aiming to reduce out-of-pocket healthcare expenses through a prepaid health plan. The NHIS provides coverage for various health services, including consultations, diagnostic tests, treatments, and hospital admissions. Over the years, efforts have been made to expand the NHIS to cover informal sector workers, vulnerable groups, and rural communities through programs such as the Basic Health Care Provision Fund (BHCPF) and the Group, Individual, and Family Social Health Insurance Programme (GIFSHIP). However, challenges such as inadequate funding, low enrollment rates, and administrative inefficiencies have limited its reach and effectiveness.

=== Revitalization of Primary Healthcare Centers (PHCs) ===
The Nigerian government has undertaken several initiatives to revitalize Primary Healthcare Centers (PHCs), which serve as the first point of contact for medical care, particularly in rural and underserved areas. This effort is part of the broader National Primary Health Care Development Agency (NPHCDA) strategy, which seeks to rehabilitate and equip PHCs across the country. Programs such as the Saving One Million Lives (SOML) initiative and the Primary Healthcare Under One Roof (PHCUOR) policy aim to ensure the availability of essential medicines, improve healthcare infrastructure, and enhance service delivery at the grassroots level. Despite these efforts, PHCs continue to face challenges, including inadequate staffing, insufficient medical supplies, and poor funding.

=== Public-Private Partnerships (PPPs) in Healthcare ===
Public Private Partnerships (PPPs) have been increasingly promoted as a strategy to bridge gaps in Nigeria's healthcare system. Through PPPs, private sector investment is encouraged in areas such as hospital infrastructure, medical equipment procurement, and healthcare service delivery. Several state governments have entered partnerships with private entities to build and manage healthcare facilities. Notable examples include the Lagos State Health Scheme (LSHS), which allows private healthcare providers to operate within the state's health insurance framework, and the Private Sector Health Alliance of Nigeria (PHN), which collaborates with the government on maternal and child healthcare initiatives. While PPPs have improved service delivery in some regions, concerns remain regarding affordability, regulatory oversight, and equitable access to healthcare services.

=== Recruitment and Retention of Health Workers ===
Nigeria has faced a persistent challenge of healthcare worker shortages, exacerbated by brain drain, where medical professionals migrate to countries with better working conditions and higher salaries. To address this, the government has introduced various incentives and training programs aimed at recruiting and retaining health professionals. Initiatives such as the Midwives Service Scheme (MSS) and the National Health Workforce Registry focus on deploying skilled personnel to under-served areas and tracking workforce distribution. Some states have implemented salary adjustments, hazard allowances, and continuous professional development programs to improve working conditions and discourage migration. However, challenges such as poor remuneration, inadequate working environments, and job dissatisfaction continue to drive health professionals abroad, affecting healthcare service delivery in the country.

=== The Society for Quality in Healthcare in Nigeria ===
The Society for Quality in Healthcare in Nigeria (SQHN) is advocating for patient safety in Nigeria. The society publishes a newsletter to ensure awareness of the need for patient safety. It also conducts training occasionally. It makes provision for registering members to ensure the widespread of its vision. Hospitals are also encouraged to sign up for accreditation in the society.

== Recommended strategies to improve the safety of healthcare in Nigeria ==
Strategies that have been recommended to be useful for improving patient safety include leadership and enhancing knowledge, identifying and learning from errors, setting standards and expectations for safety, and implementing safe systems within healthcare organisations. An example of demonstrating leadership and enhancing knowledge is leaders in healthcare organizations creating awareness and education/training programs on patient safety and its relevance in healthcare settings. The awareness of patient safety in Nigeria is currently low.

A typical example of identifying and learning from error is having a pharmacovigilance form where all adverse drug reactions are reported and collated. Adverse drug reactions are the unwanted and unexpected consequences from the use of medications. The pharmacovigilance form is already in existence in Nigeria but its implementation and monitoring could be improved. From the data gathered from the form, measures can be taken to prevent the future occurrence of these unwanted consequences.

Setting standards and expectations for safety is important to ensure that healthcare provision meets the requirements of safety and quality. Standards can be set at the local level or national level. Organizations, associations, and/or professional groups can set standards also. It has been revealed that standards could manage hazardous technologies if three criteria are met:

- Setting general standards is preferable to case-by-case decision-making;
- Some general safety philosophy, balancing risk and other factors, can be justified on normative grounds and;
- Philosophy is faithfully translated into operational terms. An example of such is the standard treatment guidelines for malaria which incorporate Artemisinin Combination Therapy (ACT) as the first line of therapy for treating malaria and exclude Chloroquine (for safety and quality care issues). In the guideline, some antimalarial drugs were excluded in pregnant women. Sulphadoxine-Pyrimethamine was advised to be used as a prophylactic antimalarial in pregnant women, especially in a malaria-endemic area like Africa.

Implementing safe systems, by erasing unsafe acts in healthcare organizations within healthcare organizations, has been recommended. It can ensure a safety culture in the healthcare environment where all employees are safety conscious and will imbibe it as a way of life for good practice. This can ensure both the healthcare professionals and patients are in a safe environment. Design of the healthcare system with the aid of human factors to ensure safety can also help. Human factors/ergonomics (safety science) helps to see quality improvement of health and social care can be better achieved through focusing on fitting the work to workers rather than the workers to the work. Getting to know the specific characteristics of each worker, as each worker has different strengths and thinking abilities, can be used to harness workers' potential to the fullest. In addition, the knowledge of interaction between people and equipment, work environments, and work activities is important for patient safety and quality improvement. This, in turn, can lead to optimizing human well-being and the healthcare system's performance. Gaining knowledge of this concept can improve patient safety and quality improvement in Nigeria.

== See also ==
- Health in Nigeria
- Mental health policies in Nigeria
- Health law in Nigeria
- Nigerian Medical Association
- EMDEX (Essential Medicines InDEX) - A Reference Source of Drug & Therapeutic Information for Nigeria's Healthcare Professionals
- Childbirth in Nigeria
- Midwives Service Scheme

== Sources ==
- Vogel, Ronald J. (1993). Financing Health Care in Sub-Saharan Africa. Greenwood Press. ISBN 978-0-313-28993-4.
- Akhtar, Rais (1991). Health Care Patterns and Planning in Developing Countries. Greenwood Press. ISBN 978-0-313-26745-1.
