= EMDEX =

EMDEX (Essential Medicines InDEX) is the most commonly used reference source of drug and therapeutic information by healthcare professionals in Nigeria. It is the largest and most up-to-date source of information on drug products approved for use in Nigeria by NAFDAC (National Agency for Food & Drug Administration & Control).

It was first published in 1991 as Nigeria's Essential Drugs (NED) Guide.
EMDEX drug information contents, arrangements, and therapeutic recommendations are supported by several references and clinical guidelines notably WHO Model Formulary, WHO ATC (Anatomical Therapeutic Chemical) Classification System, Nigeria's Essential Medicines List, and Standard Treatment Guidelines, etc. The information is regularly reviewed and updated by a select team of healthcare practitioners and academics.
The central objective of EMDEX has been to promote the rational use of medicines through the provision of independent drug information, and the use of clinical guidelines and essential medicines list.
The use of EMDEX as a reference drug manual is endorsed by the Pharmacists Council of Nigeria, the Nursing & Midwifery Council of Nigeria, and major health institutions. It is used both within and outside Nigeria by physicians, dentists, pharmacists, nurse practitioners, and auxiliary health workers at all levels of healthcare delivery. These healthcare providers rely on EMDEX for accuracy and completeness of drug information namely indications, contra-indications, precautions or warnings, adverse effects, dosages, and drug use in special populations like children, elderly, pregnancy & lactation.
EMDEX publications are also in the syllabus of various colleges & schools of medicine, pharmacy & nursing.

== EMDEX as Nigeria's National Drug Formulary ==
A national formulary is essentially a listing of available and affordable medicines that are relevant to the treatment of diseases in a particular country. It is usually a source of unbiased drug information and helps promote the rational use of safe, effective and good-quality medicines.

== EMDEX Publications ==
EMDEX vol. 1 (Drug Information for Healthcare Professionals) is published annually.
Other EMDEX print publications include:

- EMDEX vol. 2 (Nurses' Reference)
- EMDEX Paediatric Drug Guide
- Mini EMDEX (Clinician's Pocket Reference)
- EMDEX RapidRx – Quarterly Evidence-Based Medication Therapy Management Newsletter
- EMDEX API offers a comprehensive database of NAFDAC-approved drug products in Nigeria.
- RxFoods Nigeria (The Clinician’s Guide to Healthy Food Choices & Supplements, Food-Drug & Food-Disease Interactions.
- EMDEX App – available on Android & iOS
