= Endoscopic carpal tunnel release =

- Specialty: Orthopedic surgery

Endoscopic carpal tunnel release (ECTR) refers to a method of performing carpal tunnel surgery using an endoscope or an arthroscopic device to provide visualization of the anatomic structures.

Endoscopic techniques for carpal tunnel release involve one or two smaller incisions (less than half inch each) through which instrumentation is introduced including a synovial elevator, probes, knives, and an endoscope used to visualize the underside of the transverse carpal ligament. The endoscopic methods do not divide the subcutaneous tissues or the palmar fascia to the same degree as the open method does. Many studies have been done to determine whether the perceived benefits of a limited endoscopic or arthroscopic release are significant.

Many surgeons have embraced limited incision methods. It is considered to be the procedure of choice for many of these surgeons with respect to idiopathic carpal tunnel syndrome. Supporting this are the results of some of the previously mentioned series that cite no difference in the rate of complications for either method of surgery. Thus, there has been broad support for either surgical procedure using a variety of devices or incisions.

== The procedure ==
For ECTR or any carpal tunnel release surgery while there are many different blades and techniques the primary goal is to release the transverse carpal ligament (TCL) that overlies and compresses the median nerve within the carpal tunnel. It is this compression on the median nerve that leads to the characteristic 'pins and needles' paresthesia in the thumb, index, long and ring fingers. The primary benefit of endoscopic releases versus traditional open carpal tunnel release is often perceived to be the smaller incision size. ECTR incisions are commonly less than 1 cm (0.39 in) compared to a 2–4 in (51–102 mm) longitudinal incision with a traditional carpal tunnel release. However, the incision size is not the only factor that differentiates the two methods. The principle behind the endoscopic release is that the Palmar aponeurosis, a thick tough layer of tissue that lines the palm, is not divided with endoscopic methods. In addition, the endoscopic methods offer less dissection and interruption of tissue planes than the open methods because the endoscopic methods do not divide the subcutaneous tissues or the palmar fascia to the same degree as the open method does. Thus, a more rapid recovery is generally touted with ECTR as the normal skin above the TCL is not incised. Surgery, either open or endoscopic is a way to treat Carpal Tunnel Syndrome. A meta-analysis supports the conclusion that endoscopic carpal tunnel release is favored over the open carpal tunnel release in terms of a reduction in scar tenderness and increase in grip and pinch strength at a 12-week follow-up

The use of an endoscope to release the carpal tunnel was first described in 1989 by Okutsu et al. Here a flexible clear plastic tube was used with a standard endoscope to identify the transverse carpal ligament and release it with a retrograde knife.

=== Variations ===
Many variations of the endoscopic or arthroscopic methods have been described, each with its own unique apparatus and surgical protocol.

The two more common and popular devices were referred to early on as the Chow device and the 3M Agee device. The Chow device is a two-portal device, while the 3M Agee endoscopic carpal tunnel release system is a single-portal device. The Chow device was produced by Dyonics and early papers documented its success. It was heralded by its corporate manufacturer as a breakthrough in carpal tunnel surgery. The Agee 3M device used a single, transverse incision in the area of the proximal wrist flexion crease. The Chow two-portal or two-incision device has had other manifestations, and the Agee device was bought by MicroAire Surgical Instruments. Both methods are still in use today.

Additional modifications in technique for a smaller or limited incision have been accompanied by many variations of knives, rasps and tubes through which these instruments and the imaging arthroscope or endoscope are passed. Despite the many manifestations of these devices they are all either a single or two portal system. Athrex, Brown-Instratek, Linvatek and other manufacturers modified the original one or two portal systems for endoscopic carpal tunnel release. Most of these methods utilize an endoscope to visualize the under surface of the transverse carpal ligament while others simply rely on instrumentation that allows for a smaller incision and instrumentation that aids in guiding the surgeon's modified blade or knife. Lastly, several years later a distal portal or single incision in the distal palm was advocated by a group from Louisville.

=== Effectiveness ===
Many studies have been done to determine whether the perceived benefits of a limited endoscopic or arthroscopic release are truly significant. One prospective, randomized, multi-center study found no significant differences between the two groups with regard to the secondary quantitative outcome measurements. However, the open technique resulted in more tenderness of the scar than did the endoscopic method. A prospective randomized study using the MicroAire system was conducted in 2002 by Trumble and Diao et al. and revealed that good clinical outcomes and patient satisfaction are achieved more quickly when the endoscopic method of carpal tunnel release is used. Their study concluded that single-portal Endoscopic carpal tunnel release surgery is a safe and effective method of treating carpal tunnel syndrome. There was no significant difference in the rate of complications or the cost of surgery between the two groups. However, the open technique resulted in greater scar tenderness during the first three months after surgery as well as a longer time until the patients could return to work.

== Safety ==
It has been shown in recent literature that there is a learning curve for a hand surgeon who begins to use an endoscopic technique to release the transverse carpal ligament. However this same recent study also showed no significant morbidity associated with the endoscopic method.

== Research ==
Brown et al. conducted a prospective, randomized, multi-center study and found no significant differences between the two groups with regard to secondary quantitative outcome measurements. However, the open technique resulted in more tenderness of the scar than the endoscopic method. A prospective randomized study done in 2002 by Trumble revealed that good clinical outcomes and patient satisfaction are achieved more quickly with the endoscopic method. Single-portal endoscopic surgery is a safe and effective method of treating carpal tunnel syndrome. There was no significant difference in the rate of complications or the cost of surgery between the two groups. However, the open technique caused greater scar tenderness during the first three months after surgery, and a longer time before the patients could return to work. In addition, in patients without workers compensation issues, the single-incision endoscopic carpal tunnel release led to less palmar tenderness and a quicker return to work compared to the two-incision endoscopic carpal tunnel release

Despite these views, some surgeons have suggested that in their own hands endoscopic carpal tunnel release has been associated with a higher incidence of median nerve injury, and for this reason, it has been abandoned at several centers in the United States. At the 2007 meeting of the American Society for Surgery of the Hand, a former advocate of endoscopic carpal tunnel release, Thomas J. Fischer, MD, retracted his advocacy of the technique, based on his own personal assessment that the benefit of the procedure (slightly faster recovery) did not outweigh the risk of injury to the median nerve. Contrary to this one or any one opinion of any individual surgeon it has been shown that while there is a learning curve for a hand surgeon who begins to use an endoscopic technique to release the transverse carpal ligament no significant safety issues or morbidity associated with the endoscopic method exist. The use of endoscopic carpal tunnel release has continued to spread around the world and clinical and nerve electrophysiological states are significantly improved at the long-term follow-up after endoscopic carpal tunnel release. A meta-analysis supports the conclusion that endoscopic carpal tunnel release is favored over the open carpal tunnel release in terms of a reduction in scar tenderness and increase in grip and pinch strength at a 12-week follow-up In addition, in patients without workers compensation issues, the single-incision endoscopic carpal tunnel release leads to less scar tenderness and a quicker return to work compared to the two-incision endoscopic carpal tunnel release

A study comparing the open method and endoscopic method resulted in a longer interval until the patient could return to work (median, twenty-eight days, compared with fourteen days for the open-release and endoscopic-release groups).

A recent study regarding outcome of Endoscopic carpal tunnel release has shown that clinical and nerve electrophysiological states are significantly improved at the long-term follow-up after endoscopic carpal tunnel release. Further evidence supports that carpal tunnel release done endoscopically offers benefits in the early post operative period beyond that of open carpal tunnel syndrome. This came in the form of level 1 evidence as a meta-analysis that supports the conclusion that endoscopic carpal tunnel release is favored over the open carpal tunnel release in terms of a reduction in scar tenderness and increase in grip and pinch strength at a 12-week follow-up
