= Federal Medical Centre, Asaba =

Federal Medical Centre in Nigeria

Geography
- Location: Asaba, Delta State, Nigeria

Links
- Website: fmcasaba.org
- Lists: Hospitals in Nigeria

Federal Medical Centre, Asaba is a federal government of Nigeria medical centre located in Asaba, Delta State, Nigeria. The current chief medical director is Ekeneam Omo.

== History ==
Federal Medical Centre, Asaba was established in August, 1998. The hospital was formerly known as General Hospital, Asaba.

== CMD ==
The current chief medical director is Osiatuma Azubuike.

=== Managements ===
The managements in the medical center are;

Dr Omo Ekeneam as the chairman medical advisory committee, Mr Patrick Ononye Director of Administration, Dr James C Ibuaku as Deputy chair medical advisory committee, Mr Omonigho A. as director of finance and account.

== Departments in fmc Asaba ==
- Department of Radiology
- Department of surgery
- Department of physiotherapy
- Department of family medicine
- Department of pathology
- Department of anaesthesia
- Department of pharmacy
- Department of Nursing
- Department of pediatrics
- Department of internal medicine
- Department dentistry
- Department of Accident and emergency
- Department of communicable diseases and control
- Department of haematology
- Department of ophthalmology
- Department of health records and management
- department of public health
- Department of information and technology
- Department of Internal audits
- Department of stores and supply
- Department of social welfare
- Department of servicom

== Inauguration of Nursing college ==
In may 2024, college of nursing was inaugurated in federal medical center Asaba.
