= Thread carpal tunnel release =

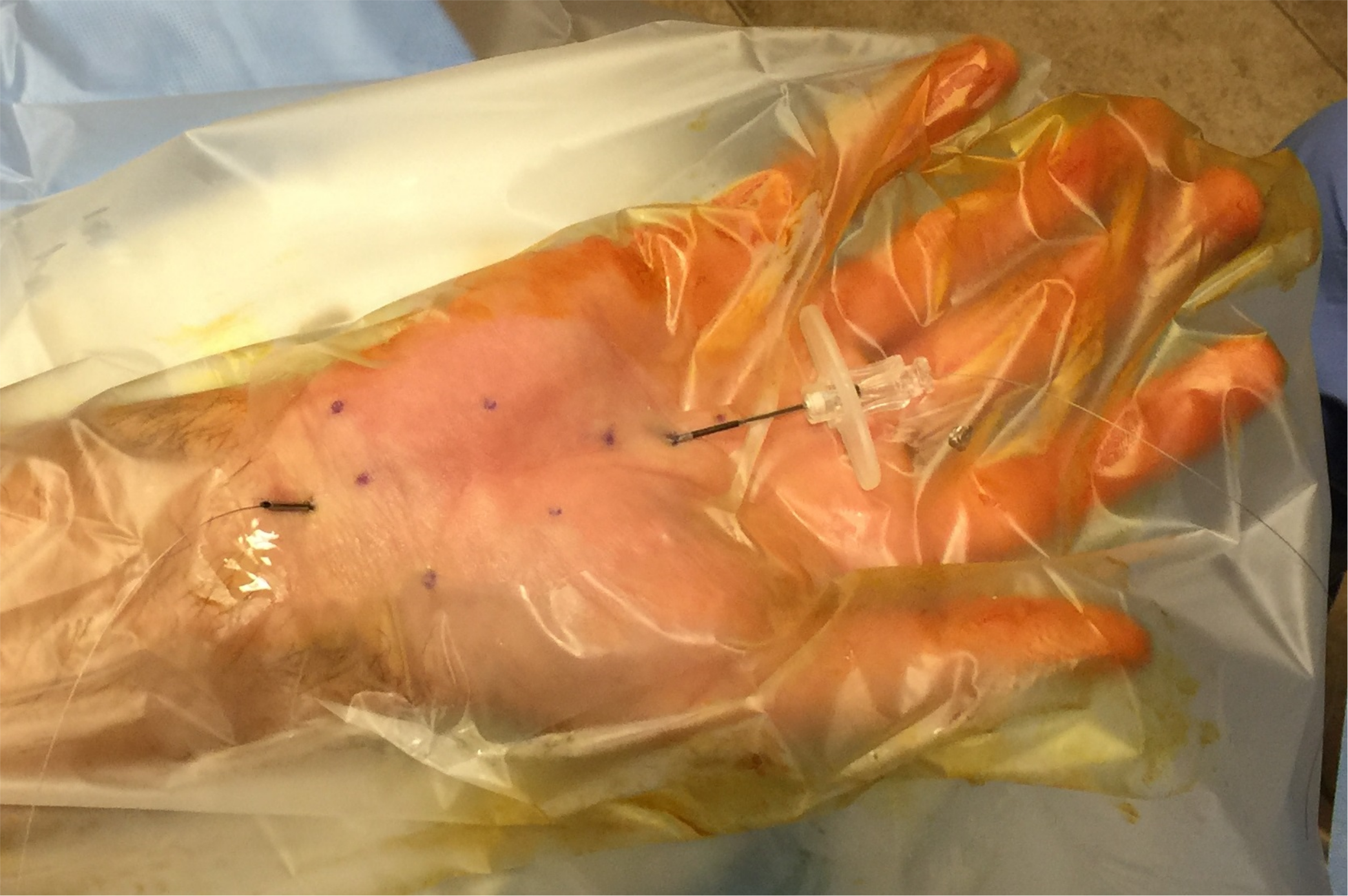
- Under the guidance of ultrasound, the routing needle makes a loop with a piece of cutting thread about the transverse carpal ligament in two needle passes.

Thread carpal tunnel release (TCTR), also known as the Guo technique, is a minimally invasive technique that uses a surgical transecting thread to divide the transverse carpal ligament. Unlike blade-based carpal tunnel release techniques, in which control and transection occur simultaneously, TCTR establishes control before transection begins. This “control-before-cutting” sequence is the distinguishing feature of TCTR.

== Procedure ==
Procedure of TCTR

Under the real-time guidance of ultrasound, a spinal needle is inserted at the palm of the hand and advanced underneath the transverse carpal ligament (TCL) and exiting at the wrist. Through this needle, a fine smooth thread (0.2 mm in diameter) is fed. The needle is inserted again in the same fashion over the TCL and the thread is again looped through back out of the original needle entry. The thread surrounds the TCL and is manipulated in a back and forth motion to divide the TCL. Once complete, the thread is removed and two small bandages are placed on the needle puncture sites. The procedure takes 10 minutes in a clinic based office.

=== Thread ===
The frictional effect of a sliding thread can cut tissue. This effect is more moderate than the abrasive effect found when using, for example, a wire saw. The frictional division of soft tissue concentrates the shear forces into the targeted tissue, resulting in significantly less collateral damage to adjacent anatomic structures than can be caused by the plowing and cutting of abrasive dividing.

Thread can be used to divide soft tissue in minimally invasive surgeries due to its unique properties: The flexibility of thread allows it to be routed along a designated path to form a loop around the targeted tissue that precisely controls the division. The nature of thread transection ensures that tissue is divided only inside the loop of thread around the targeted tissue without injuring adjacent non-targeted tissues. Thread can be easily placed using a spinal needle with only two punctures as entry and exit for the thread. Precise looping or routing is essential to the safe and effective use of a dividing thread. Precise routing is achieved percutaneously by use of real-time ultrasound guidance.

== Advantage ==
The routing control accuracy of TCTR is 0.15-0.20 mm, precise enough to preserve superficial palmar aponeurosis, common digital nerves and the communicating branch between the ulnar nerve and median nerve, while that is difficult or impossible for OCTR or ECTR. Through the technique of TCTR, the possible postoperative complications, such as pillar pain, scar tenderness, or functional weakness, may be minimized significantly by avoiding the unnecessary injuries and disturbers to the surrounding of TCL during the procedure of decompressing the median nerve.
