= List of Nigerian engineers =

This is a list of notable engineers in Nigeria arranged in alphabetical order.

== A ==
- Babajide Agunbiade A renowned Subsea Engineer, 1 of 13 subject matter experts worldwide.
- Akinsola Olusegun Faluyi (Born, 13 November 1934) is a Nigerian mechanical engineer and former president of the Council for the Regulation of Engineering (COREN) in Nigeria.
- Abubakar Sani Sambo, OON (Born 31 July 1955) is a Nigerian mechanical engineer and former director-general of the Energy Commission of Nigeria (ECN).
- Mayen Adetiba (born 1954) is a Nigerian actor who went on to be a leading civil engineer.
- Ahmad Salihijo Ahmad is a Nigerian engineer
- Godman Akinlabi is a Nigerian pastor, author, public speaker and engineer.
- Deji Akinwande professor of electrical and computer engineering
- Demola Aladekomo is a computer engineer
- Bolaji Aluko a professor of chemical engineering
- Edet Amana (born December 11, 1938) is a Nigerian engineer.
- Idiat Amusu female agricultural engineer in Nigeria
- Aderemi Aaron-Anthony Atayero
- Ifedayo Akintunde, Nigerian engineer, first African to win the WFEO Medal of Engineering Excellence. Distinguished Fellow of the Nigerian Society of Engineers (NSE), and former president of the society.
- Amusan Tauheed Abayomi FNSE, FNICE, FNIWE (Born, 17 May 1965) is a Nigerian civil engineer, water engineer and structural Engineer and former SA to the Hon Minister of Water Resources. Former General Manager FCT Water Board. Ag Director of Engineering Services, FCDA in Nigeria.

Akintayo Charles Akintola FNSE, FNIMechE, FNIEE, FNIFEngM is a Nigerian Agricultural, Mechanical, Environment and Facilities Engineer. Born, 7 September 1966. Former Chairman, NSE Ikeja Branch, Former Executive Committee Member NSE. Presently, Managing Partner, Dynamicinitiative Limited a leading total engineering resource company.

== B ==
- Babalola Borishade an electrical engineer,
- Maikanti Baru
- Olufemi Bamiro Professor of Mechanical Engineering
- Rahmon Ade Bello s a Nigerian professor of Chemical engineering, educational administrator and former vice chancellor of the University of Lagos, Nigeria

== D ==
- Danladi Slim Matawal, (Born 30 October 1955) is a Nigerian professor of Civil engineering and the Director-General of the Nigerian Building and Road Research Institute (NBRRI)
- John Dabiri a Nigerian-American aeronautics engineer
- Daere Akobo

== E ==
- Ebele Ofunneamaka Okeke (14 June 1948) is a Nigerian civil engineer and former Head of Nigerian Civil Service
- Edet James Amana (11 December 1938) is a Nigerian Civil engineer and former President of the Nigerian Academy of Engineering
- Ernest Ndukwe, Officer of the order of Niger (Born 2 September 1948) is a Nigerian Electrical engineer and former Chief Executive Officer of the Nigerian Communications Commission, NCC
- Eli Jidere Bala (Born 19 September 1954) is a Nigerian professor of Mechanical engineering and the Director-General of the Energy Commission of Nigeria (ECN)

== F ==
- Franklin Erepamo Osaisai (Born 1 October 1958), Former Director-General and Chief Executive Officer of the Nigeria Atomic Energy Commission.
- Seun Fakorede

== G ==
- Umar Garba, CEO/EVC Nigerian Communications Commission, electronic engineering

== H ==
- Femi Hamzat

== I ==
- Ibrahim Khaleel Inuwa (born 15 April 1949. Kano State). Mechanical Engineer. Past President NSE, Past President COREN, Past Deputy President NIM.

== J ==
- Joseph Atubokiki Ajienka (born 10 January 1955, Rivers State, Nigeria) is a Nigerian professor of Petroleum engineering

== K ==
- Ahmadu Musa Kida is a Nigerian engineer and former basketball player

== L ==
- Micheal Oladimeji Faborede (Born September 1956), Professor of Agricultural Engineerin

== M ==
- Salihu Mustafa

== N ==
- Nicholas Agiobi Damachi, Officer of the Order of the Niger, OON

== O ==
- Oyewusi Ibidapo Obe (Born July, 1951) is a Nigerian professor of System engineering
- Ogbonnaya Onu (born 1 December 1951) is a Chemical engineer and the first Executive Governor of Abia State
- Olawale Adeniji Ige Member of the Order of the Federal Republic, MFR (Born 13 October 1938) is a Nigerian Electrical engineer and former Minister of the Federal Ministry of Communications (1990-1992)
- Chris Ogiemwonyi
- Adeola Olubamiji Nigerian-Canadian Technologist
- Babatunde Ogunnaike an American chemical engineer of Nigerian descent
- Soni Oyekan is a Nigerian-American chemical engineer,

== P ==
- Azikiwe Peter Onwualu (27 April 1959) is a professor of Agricultural engineering

== R ==
- Rahmon Ade Bello (Born, October 1948) is a Nigerian professor of Chemical engineering

== S ==
- Samuel Olatunde Fadahunsi OFR, CON (March 1920 - August 2014) was a Nigerian Civil engineer and former President of the Council for the Regulation of Engineering in Nigeria (COREN)
- Hauwa Muhammed Sadique is a Nigerian engineer
- Ah
- Olatokunbo Somolu is a Nigerian structural engineer
- Igho Sanomi is a Nigerian businessman, geologist,

== U ==
- Umar Buba Bindir (Born 11 August 1961) is a Nigerian Agricultural engineer and incumbent Director-General of the National Office for Technology Acquisition (Notap).

== Y ==
Andrew Yakubu

== See also ==
- List of vice chancellors in Nigeria
- Nigerian Academy of Engineering
