= Grace Chijimma Ezema =

Nigerian electrical engineer

- Born: Grace Chijimma; June 30, 1942; Isiokpo, Ideato L.G.A., Imo State
- Died: May 8, 2024 (aged 81); Enugu, Enugu State
- Education: Ahmadu Bello University
- Occupation: Electrical engineer
- Years active: 1966-2006
- Known for: First female electrical engineer in Nigeria
- Spouse: Paul O. Ezema

Grace Chijimma Ezema (née Ezekoka) (June 30, 1942 – May 8, 2024) was a Nigerian electrical engineer, recognized as the first female graduate of electrical engineering in Nigeria. She had a notable career with the National Electricity Power Authority (NEPA) and later founded Guftane Engineering Nigeria Limited.

== Early life and education ==
Grace Chijimma Ezema was born on June 30, 1942, in Isiokpo, Ideato L.G.A., Imo State, Nigeria, to Chief Isaac N. Ezekoka and Mrs. Angelina Ezekoka. She began her education at Township School in Port Harcourt and attended Queen's School, Enugu, from 1956 to 1962. After graduating with a Grade I from the W.A.S.C. (Sciences), she studied pure mathematics and applied physics at the Federal Science School in Lagos for her A Levels.

In 1963, Ezema enrolled in electrical engineering at Ahmadu Bello University (ABU), Zaria, and graduated in 1966, becoming Nigeria's first female graduate in the field. She earned a certificate in management from the Nigerian Institute of Management in 1973.

== Career ==
Ezema began her career in 1966 with the National Electricity Power Authority (NEPA) as a communications engineer in Lagos until 1967. She held various positions within NEPA, including research engineer at Afam Power Station in 1967, commercial engineer in Lagos in 1971, and mains engineer in Kaduna in 1972.

In 1974, Ezema was subsequently transferred to NEPA's Enugu offices, where she served as a planning and construction engineer until 1978.

=== Entrepreneurial ventures and academia ===
In 1978, Ezema resigned from NEPA to establish Guftane Engineering Nigeria Limited, focusing on rural electrification projects. She also founded Pisces Integrated Farms Limited, contributing to Enugu State's agricultural output.

Ezema joined academia in 1998 as a senior lecturer in the Electrical & Electronics Department at the Institute of Management and Technology (IMT), Enugu. She served as head of department from 2004 to 2006 before retiring.

== Personal life and death ==
Ezema married Dr. Paul O. Ezema, a lecturer at the University of Nigeria in 1974. They had four children.

Ezema died on May 8, 2024, in Enugu.

== Recognitions ==
Ezema was a registered member of the Nigerian Society of Engineers (NSE) and the Council for the Regulation of Engineering in Nigeria (COREN). She played a role in establishing the Association of Professional Women Engineers in Nigeria (APWEN) and participated in international engineering conferences.

The Department of Electrical/Electronic Engineering at IMT, Enugu, formally recognized her contributions to engineering and education in a ceremony attended by engineers and academics from her alma mater, ABU.
