= Joana Maduka =

Nigerian female engineer

- Olutumbi
- Born: 6 May 1941 (age 85); Ilesa
- Education: Otapete Methodist School Queens school University of Ife Trinity College Dublin
- Occupation: Engineer
- Organization: Institution of Electrical Engineers the Nigerian Society of Engineers the Nigerian Academy of Engineering
- Spouse: Vincent Maduka
- Parent(s): Mr Daniel Dada and Olufunmilayo Layinka

Joana Maduka (born 6 May 1941) is a Nigerian engineer. She became the first female fellow of the Council for the Regulation of Engineering in Nigeria (COREN) in 1974. She is also a fellow of the Institution of Electrical Engineers, the Nigerian Society of Engineers and the Nigerian Academy of Engineering. She was made an honorary fellow of the Nigerian Institute of Science Technology in 1987 and Yaba College of Technology in 1988. She was honoured as a Member of the Order of the Federal Republic in 2008. She was the first female COREN President.

== Early life and education ==
Maduka was born on 6 May 1941 in Ilesha, Osun State. She is the first child of Mr Daniel Dada and Olufunmilayo Layinka. She went to Otapete Methodist School for her primary schooling. She attended Methodist Girls’ School then went to Queen's School in 1955. She had her B.Sc. in applied physics from University of Ife in 1965. She got her M.Sc. in engineering from Trinity College Dublin in 1969. In 1966, Maduka took the Institution of Electrical Engineers graduation examination and passed.

== Career ==
Maduka worked as a graduate assistant engineer for Western Nigeria Television (WNTV) in Ibadan in 1965. She was a graduate apprentice in the Engineering Division of Western Nigeria Broadcasting Corporation in Ibadan from 1965 to 1966. From 1966 to 1970 she was a lecturer in the department of Applied Physics at the University of Ife She joined Leccom Associates, a firm for consulting engineers, in 1970 and became the principal partner there in 1975.

In 1993, Maduka became the founder of Friends of the Environment, an innovation which seeks to improve renewable energy, manage wastes and also empower women.

She also founded the Association of Professional Women Engineers of Nigeria (APWEN).

Maduka was made the Chairperson of the Power Sector Group, set up by the Lagos Chamber of Commerce and Industry in 2014 to ensure improvements in the power sector and protect stakeholder interests.

On 23 June 2016 she became the ninth president, and the first female president, of the Nigerian Academy of Engineering.

She is the current president of the Ijesha society.

== Personal ==
She is married to Vincent Ifeanyi Maduka a former director general Of Nigerian Television Authority (NTA). They have four children. She also has multiple grandchildren, including Tobi Maduka, Ashikodi Maduka, Timi Maduka and Osita Maduka
