= Ibilola Amao =

Nigerian engineer

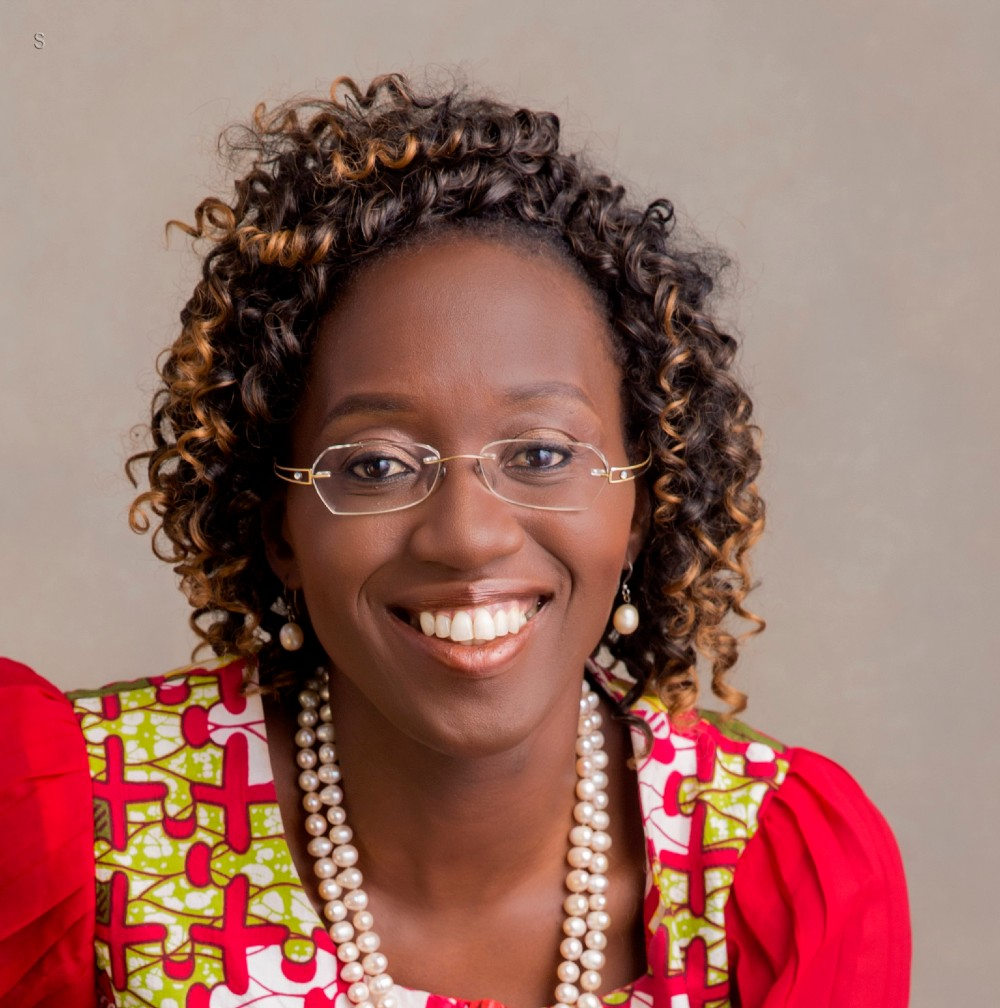
- Born: Lagos, Nigeria
- Education: Queen Mary University of London; Bradford University; Manchester Business School
- Scientific career
- Fields: Civil and Structural engineering
- Workplaces: Lonadek Services; Council for the Regulation of Engineering in Nigeria; Nigerian Society of Engineers; Energy Institute

Ibilola Amao is a Nigerian and British engineer, principal consultant of Lonadek Services (United Kingdom and Nigeria) and consultant for the vision 2020 initiative. She received several awards such as most active women business enterprise IWEC 2016, Energy Institute Champion 2016, C3E international woman of distinction Award, Access Bank “W” 100, and the 2019 Forbes Africa rising star Award. She was a Vital Voices (VV) GROW fellow, a member of vv100 and a WEConnect international fellow. Ibilola was also the co-founder of the cedar STEM and entrepreneurship hub.

Ibilola is a member of the Council for the Regulation of Engineering in Nigeria (COREN), panel of judges for the Royal Academy of Engineering UK Africa prize, and institute of Director's programmes committee. She is the chairperson for the industry advisory team, a chartered member of the Nigerian Society of Engineers (NSE) and a fellow of the Energy Institute (EI), UK. She specializes in civil and structural engineering; engineering technology and innovation; and was involved in the actualization of the Nigerian Oil and Gas Industry Content Development (NOGICD) guidelines passed into law on 22 April 2010. As a STEM entrepreneur, she focuses on youth empowerment and increasing the participation of women in STEM professions dominated by men in Nigeria.

== Early life and education ==
Ibilola is one of the six children born to a Nigerian highway engineer. She obtained her O levels from queens school, Ibadan, Nigeria and left for London where she acquired a first-class honors degree in civil and structural engineering from Queen Mary college, University of London. Afterwards, she got a PhD in computer-aided design and draughting from Bradford University, United Kingdom. After her PhD, she trained as a PPL engineer for three years. She also attended Manchester Business School, United Kingdom. She returned to Nigeria from England in 1991 for the National Youth Service Corps (NYSC) program in Abuja, Nigeria. Ibilola, born into a royal family, married a Yoruba man from Ibadan, Nigeria, in 1994 on her return to Nigeria. Her union of 27 years produced three children.

== Career ==
Upon return to Nigeria from England, Ibilola worked with university of Lagos as an associate lecturer with professor Ibidapo Obe. Then, she proceeded to a one-year National Youth Service Corps (NYSC) program during which she started and founded Lonadek in 1991. After her NYSC, she worked with National Engineering and Technical Company (NETCO) in 1992 where she trained the first 67 engineers recruited by Nigerian National Petroleum Corporation (NNPC) for NETCO. She left NETCO in 2003 to build Lonadek into a consultancy services company to cater for sustainable asset development and maintenance through qualitative local participation.

Ibilola sat on the Lagos State Technical and Vocational Education Board as the chairperson of the industry advisory team. This afforded her the opportunity to work on bridging the gap between the industry and the academia, empowering students with industry sort skills through internship placement opportunities.

== Awards and nominations ==
Ibilola was recognized with the Vital Voices (VV) 100 women in entrepreneurship award. In 2020, her contribution to advancing the role of women in the energy sector was acknowledged with the C3E international woman of distinction award at the 11th clean energy ministerial program. In 2022, Ibilola was inducted as a fellow of the Nigerian Academy of Engineering, the induction was announced by the President of the academy. In 2023, Ibilola becomes a fellow of the Queen Mary University of London, the fellowship was in acknowledgement for her dedication to developing STEM talents and mentoring of women.
