= Abubakar Sani Sambo =

Nigerian Profeasor

Director-General of the Energy Commission of Nigeria (ECN)
- In office 2007–2013

Vice-Chancellor of Abubakar Tafawa Balewa University
- In office 1995–2004
- Preceded by: Buba G. Bajoga
- Succeeded by: Garba Aliyu Babaji

Personal details
- Born: 31 July 1955 (age 70); Kaduna State, Nigeria
- Political party: Non-partisan

Abubakar Sani Sambo OON (Born 31 July 1955) is a Nigerian Mechanical engineer, former Director-General of the Energy Commission of Nigeria (ECN) and former Vice-Chancellor of Abubakar Tafawa Balewa University.

== Early life and education ==
He was born on 31 July 1955 in Zaria, Kaduna State, Nigeria. He obtained a Bachelor of Science (B.sc) degree in mechanical engineering from the prestigious Ahmadu Bello University, Zaria in 1979 with a first class honour. In 1983, he obtained a doctorate degree, Ph.D. in mechanical engineering from the University of Sussex, United Kingdom. After he received his Ph.D, he returned to Nigeria to join the services of Bayero University, Kano where he rose to the position of a senior lecturer in 1989 and was appointed a professor in energy studies at the same University. He was appointed as the vice-chancellor of Abubakar Tafawa Balewa University in 1995 and served in this capacity for two terms (1995-2004). He was a former director-general of the Energy Commission of Nigeria (ECN) till 2013.

== Awards ==
- Officer of the Order of the Niger, OON

== Fellowships and membership ==
- Fellow of the Nigerian Academy of Engineering
- Fellow of the Nigerian Society of Engineers
- Member of the Council for the Regulation of Engineering in Nigeria (COREN)
- International Solar Energy Society (ISES) (1986)
- International Energy Foundation (IEF)(1990)
- Member of the World Renewable Energy Network (WREN) (1992).
- Member of the Solar Energy Society of Nigeria
- Member of the Nigerian Academy of Science

== See also ==
- List of notable engineers in Nigeria
- List of vice chancellors in Nigeria
