= Salihu Mustafa =

Vice-Chancellor of Federal University of Technology Yola (FUTY)
- In office 1999–2004
- Preceded by: Aliyu Alkali Ahmad
- Succeeded by: Abdullahi Yusuf Ribadu

Personal details
- Born: 1948 (age 77–78) Hong, Adamawa State, Nigeria
- Spouse: Hajiya Fatima
- Education: Ahmadu Bello University, Zaria
- Profession: Civil Engineer

Salihu Mustafa, FNSE, FAENG, FNAHS, FAS, (born 1948) is a Nigerian academic, professor of civil engineering and former Vice-Chancellor of Federal University of Technology Yola (FUTY), Yola, Adamawa State, Nigeria. He has taught in many universities in Nigeria and is currently a visiting professor to Kebbi State University of Science and Technology, Aliero and Usmanu Danfodiyo University, Sokoto. He is married to Hajiya Fatima and they have four children.

== Early life ==
He was born in 1948 in Hong, LGA of Adamawa State (former Gongola State), in North East Nigeria.

== Education ==
He attended General Murtala Mohammed College, Yola, and Federal Government College, Sokoto. He later proceeded to Ahmadu Bello University, Zaria, Kaduna where he graduated with B.Eng (Civil Engineering) degree in 1973. In 1976 he obtained an M.Sc. degree in civil engineering with specialization in Water Resources Technology from University of Birmingham in the UK and thereafter, a Ph.D. in Civil Engineering (1981) from the University of Strathclyde, Scotland.

== Academic career ==
Mustafa after serving his compulsory National Youth Service Corp scheme as assistant engineer at Ijora Water Works, Lagos State, he began his teaching career at Ahmadu Bello University’s Department of Civil Engineering Zaria, Kaduna as assistant lecturer in 1974. Fourteen years later, he attained the rank of associate professor of civil engineering and was appointed full professor of civil engineering at Abubakar Tafawa Balewa University (ATBU), Bauchi in 1989. From 1989 to 1991, he served as head, Department of Civil Engineering and dean of School of Engineering in ATBU, Bauchi. He was appointed the vice-chancellor of Federal University of Technology Yola (FUTY). In addition, he served as chairman of the planning pommittee for the establishment of Adamawa State University, Mubi and chairman of the planning and implementation committee for the establishment of American University of Nigeria, Yola, both in Adamawa State. For five years (2013-2018), he served as a consultant on developing engineering programs at Kebbi State University of Science and Technology, Aliero. He equally served as a consultant on developing engineering programmes at Usmanu Danfodiyo University, Sokoto (February 2016 to 2018). He has published over sixty peer-reviewed articles in reputable national and international journals. One of his books, A Textbook of Hydrology and Water Resources is currently used for teaching undergraduate and postgraduate engineering students in universities and widely consulted by practicing engineers. His forthcoming book is on Fluid Mechanics and Hydraulics. He is the current Chairman Editorial Board of the Nigerian Academy of Engineering journal, Innovative Solutions in Engineering.

== Public service ==
Mustafa served as a Special Adviser in the Federal Ministry of Agriculture and Water Resources from 1991 to 1993. He later served as Director, Research and Postgraduate Development at the National Universities Commission (NUC), Abuja from 1995 to 1999 and Vice-Chancellor, Federal University of Technology Yola from 1999 to 2004. He served as Chairman, PIU World Bank Sector Adjustment Project for federal universities in Nigeria from 1995 to 1996.

== Fellowships and membership ==
- Mustafa is the Founder and Chairman, Triton International School, Nasarawa State (2006 to date).
- Member, Technical Advisory Committee of the Nigerian Building and Road Research Institute (NBBRI), Abuja.
- Chairman, Ministerial Policy Advisory Committee (MPAC) on Water Resources, Federal Ministry of Water Resources, Abuja (Jan 2018 to date).
- Member, Technical Committee on Annual Flood Outlook (AFO), under Nigeria Hydrological Services Agency, Abuja (2013 to date).
- Chairman, Governing Board Adamawa State University, Mubi, Adamawa State (April to June 2019).
- Member, Board of Assessors for Nigeria Merit Award (2001-2006).
- Chairman, Board of ABTI Academy, Yola, Adamawa State (2002-2005).
- Past Chairman, Nigeria National Committee for UNESCO-IHP
- Past President of the Nigerian Association of Hydrological Sciences.
- Chairman, Governing Board, College of Education Jalingo, Taraba State (1986-1992).
- Member, Board of Plateau State Polytechnic, Barikin Ladi, Plateau State (1986-1989).
- Fellow, Nigerian Society of Engineers.
- Fellow, Nigerian Academy of Engineering.
- Fellow, Nigerian Association of Hydrological Sciences.
- Fellow, Nigerian Academy of Science.

== See also ==
- List of notable engineers in Nigeria
- List of vice chancellors in Nigeria
