= Danladi Slim Matawal =

Nigerian engineer (born 1955)

Distinguished Professor of Civil Engineering & former Director-General/CEO NBRRI-FMST Abuja - Nigeria.

Personal details
- Born: 30 October 1955 (age 70) Plateau State, Nigeria
- Party: Non-Partisan
- Education: B.eng Civil Engineering, Ahmadu Bello University, M.Sc Civil Engineering, University of London Ph.D Civil Engineering
- Alma mater: Ahmadu Bello University, Zaria
- Occupation: Research and Lecturing
- Profession: Professor of Civil Engineering

Danladi Slim Matawal (born 30 October 1955) is a Nigerian distinguished Professor of (Civil engineering); a former Director-General & CEO, Nigerian Building & Road Research Institute (NBRRI), an agency of the Federal Ministry of Science and Technology. He is currently back to Abubakar Tafawa Balewa University, Bauchi - Nigeria.

== Life and career ==
He was born on 30 October 1955 in, Plateau State, Nigeria. He attended elementary school at Nigeria Army Primary School, Plateau State. He attended Government College, Keffi, Nasarawa State where he obtained the West African School Certificate (WASC) in 1968. He later attended Ahmadu Bello University, Zaria where he obtained a Bachelor of engineering (B.eng) degree in Civil engineering with a First Class Honour (1974-1978). In 1980, he obtained a Commonwealth scholarship to study at the Imperial College, University of London, where he obtained a Master of Science (M.Sc.) in Civil Engineering (1981) and Doctorate degree, Ph.D. in civil engineering from the University of Lagos (1992). He joined the services of Plateau State Polytechnic as a director of works in 1983 but left the Plateau State Polytechnic in 1987 to join the services of Abubakar Tafawa Balewa University Bauchi as a Lecturer II in the Department of Civil Engineering where he was later appointed a professor in 1999.

== Official duties ==
He had served in several capacities in Nigeria. In 2000, he was appointed as Director of Centre for Distance Learning Abubakar Tafawa Balewa University for four years, a tenure that ended in 2004. After he left that position, he was immediately appointed as Dean of Engineering and Engineering Technology at the same university, a position he held for four years (2004-2008). After that position, he was appointed as Dean of Postgraduate School at the same institution, a position he held for three years (2008-2011). In 2011, he was appointed as Director-General and chief executive officer of the Nigerian Building and Road Research Institute (NBRRI), an agency under Federal Ministry of Science and Technology.

== Awards and fellowships ==
- Raw Material Research and Development Agency Award (2006).
- Fellow of the Nigerian Academy of Engineering.
- Member of the Council for the Regulation of Engineering in Nigeria (COREN)
- Member of the Nigerian Institute of Management Science
- Member of the Solar Energy Society of Nigeria
- Fellow of the Nigerian Society of Engineers.

== See also ==
- List of notable engineers in Nigeria
- List of awards and fellowships for Prof Danladi Slim Matawal- https://www.theabusites.com/prof-danladi-slim-matawal-dg-nbrri/
