= Olatokunbo =

Olatokunbo (Yoruba: Ọlátòkunbọ̀, pronounced [ɔ̄látòkũ̄bɔ̀]) is a unisex Yoruba given name, meaning 'nobility/wealth returns from overseas'. It also occurs as a surname. Notable people with the name include:

- Lenrie Olatokunbo Aina (born 1950), Nigerian academic and public servant
- Adeyinka Olatokunbo Asekun (born 1956), Nigerian banker and diplomat
- Olatokunbo Susan Olasobunmi Abeke "Toks" Olagundoye (born 1975), Nigerian actress
- Olatokunbo Oduyinka Olopade (born 1953), Nigerian jurist and judge
- Olatokunbo Arinola Somolu (born 1950), Nigerian structural engineer
- Rashid Olatokunbo Oladobe Alao Yussuff (born 1989), English footballer
- Kudirat Motonmori Olatokunbo (born 1958), known as Kudirat Kekere-Ekun, Nigerian jurist and judge
