= Umar (given name) =

Umar is a masculine given name. Notable people with the name include:

- Umar Faruq Abd-Allah (born 1948), American Islamic theologian
- Umar Farouk Abdulmutallab (born 1986), Nigerian attempted bomber
- Umar Farouk Ahmed, Military Administrator of Cross River State, Nigeria
- Umar Seno Aji (1915–1984), Chief Justice of the Supreme Court of Indonesia
- Umar Akmal (born 1990), Pakistani cricketer
- Umar ibn Ali (died 680), Son of Ali ibn Abi Talib
- Umar al-Aqta (died 863), Emir of Malatya
- Umar Sulaiman Al-Ashqar (1940–2012), Jordanian Muslim scholar and Salafist preacher
- Umar ibn Abd al-Aziz (c. 680–720), Umayyad caliph
- Umar al-Bitar (1886–1946), Syrian rebel leader
- Umar Abdullah al-Kunduzi (born 1979), Afghan terror detainee
- Umar Al-Qadri, Pakistani Irish Muslim scholar
- Umar al-Tilmisani (1904–1986), Third General Guide of the Egyptian Muslim Brotherhood
- Umar ibn Ibrahim ibn Waqid al-Umari, Governor of the Yemen
- Umar ibn al-Walid, Umayyad prince, Commander and Amir al-hajj
- Umar al-Zaydani (died 1706), Ottoman district governor
- Umar Amin (born 1989), Pakistani cricketer
- Umar Jauro Audi (born 1967), Nigerian politician
- Umar Bakkalcha (1953?–1980), Ethiopian nationalist
- Umar Ata Bandial (born 1958), Pakistani judge
- Umar Bashiru (born 1997), Ghanaian footballer
- Umar Bhatti (born 1984), Pakistani-born Canadian cricketer
- Umar Buba Bindir (born 1961), Nigerian agricultural engineer
- Umar Bologi II (born 1982), Etsu Patigi
- Umar Kura (died 1881), Shehu of Bornu
- Umar Cheema (born 1976), Pakistani journalist
- Umar Farooq Dar, Pakistani politician
- Umar Bin Muhammad Daudpota (1896–1958), Sindhi researcher, historian, linguist and scholar
- Umar Aftab Dhillon, Pakistani politician
- Umar Dimayev (1908–1972), Chechen accordionist
- Umar Din, Sultan of the Adal Sultanate
- Umar Saidu Doka, Nigerian politician
- Umar Usman Dukku, Nigerian politician
- Umar Dzambekov (born 1997), Russian-born Austrian professional boxer
- Umar Dzhabrailov (born 1958), Russian politician
- Umar Edelkhanov (born 1963), Russian weightlifter
- Umar Ibrahim El-Yakub, Nigerian politician
- Umar Eshmurodov (born 1992), Uzbekistani footballer
- Umar Kamaal Farooqui (born 1992), Indian politician and lawyer
- Umar Farooq (cricketer) (born 1979), Danish cricketer
- Umar Garba (born 1959), Nigerian academic
- Umar Ghalib (1930–2020), Somali politician
- Umar Gombe (born 1983), Nigerian actor
- Umar Gul (born 1982), Pakistani cricket coach and former cricketer
- Umar Mohammed Gunu (born 1954), Nigerian Politician
- Umar bin Hafiz (born 1963), Yemeni Sunni Islamic scholar
- Umar ibn Hafsun, Al-Andalusian rebel political and military leader
- Umar Khayam Hameed (born 1989), British Pakistani athlete
- Umar Hassan, Eritrean commander
- Umar Bin Hassan (born 1948), American poet and recording artist
- Umar bin Haydar, Uzbek Emir of Bukhara
- Umar ibn Hubayra, Umayyad general and governor of Iraq
- Umar ibn Hafs Hazarmard (died 771), Abbasid provincial governor
- Umar Islam (born 1997), Pakistani cricketer
- Umar Israilov (1982–2009), Chechen warlord
- Umar Khan Jamali, Pakistani politician
- Umar Javed (born 1983), Pakistani cricketer
- Umar Hajee Ahmed Jhaveri, Indian South African businessman
- Umar Buba Jibrin (born 1960), Nigerian politician
- Umar Johnson (born 1974), American Afrocentrist psychologist and activist
- Umar Usman Kadafur (born 1976), Nigerian politician
- Umar Rida Kahhala (1905–1987), Syrian historian and writer
- Umar Kakumba, Ugandan management consultant and academic
- Umar Kamani (born 1988), English fashion retailer
- Umar Abdullahi Kamba (born 1968), Nigerian politician
- Umar Karsanov (born 1981), Russian footballer
- Umar Kayam (1932–2002), Indonesian sociologist and writer
- Umar Khalid (born 1987), Indian student activist
- Umar Daraz Khallil, Pakistani actor
- Umer Khan (cricketer) (born 1999), Pakistani cricketer
- Umar Khan (umpire) (1919–1990), Pakistani cricketer and umpire
- Umar Ali Khan, Indian politician
- Umar Kiyani (born 1995), Pakistani cricketer
- Umar Komajago (died 1520), Kanfari of the Songhai Empire
- Umar Kremlev (born 1982), Russian sports official
- Umar Krupp, Ghanaian actor
- Umar Muda Lawal, Nigerian politician
- Umar Lubis (born 1973), Indonesian actor
- Umar Makram (1750–1822), Egyptian political leader
- Umar ibn Ubayd Allah ibn Ma'mar (died 702/3), 7th-century Arab tribal leader
- Umar Nazir Mir (born 1993), Indian cricketer
- Umar Shaikh Mirza I (1356–1394), Timurid prince
- Umar Bala Mohammed (born 1998), Nigerian footballer
- Umar Sultan Mohamed (1956–2021), Sultan of the Arap
- Umar Muhammad (born 1975), American football player
- Umar Muhayshi (1941–1984), Libyan politician
- Umar Mustafa Al Muntasir (1939–2001), Prime Minister of Libya
- Umar Namadi (born 1963), Nigerian politician
- Umar Naseer, Maldivian politician
- Umar Nawaz (born 1986), Canadian cricketer
- Umar Nissar (born 1993), Indian cricketer
- Umar Nurmagomedov (born 1996), Russian mixed martial artist
- Umar Osman (born 2003), Malaysian sprinter
- Umar Farouk Osman (born 1998), Ghanaian footballer
- Umar Pate (born 1964), Nigerian academic
- Umar Patek (born 1970), Indonesian terrorist
- Umar Ramle (born 1996), Singaporean footballer
- Umar Rana (born 1975), Pakistani stand-up comedian
- Umar Rasheed (born 1962), Pakistani cricketer
- Umar Abdul-Razak (born 1975), Ghanaian agriculturist
- Umar Salamov (born 1994), Russian boxer
- Umar ibn Sa'd (died 686), son of prophet Muhammad's companion, Sa'd ibn Abi Waqqas
- Umar Sadiq (born 1997), Nigerian footballer
- Umar Saif (born 1979), Pakistani computer scientist
- Umar Sani (born 1963), Nigerian politician and advisor to the government
- Umar Semata (born 1987), Ugandan Muay Thai fighter
- Umar Siddiq (born 1992), Pakistani cricketer
- Umar Ibrahim Tsauri, Nigerian politician
- Umar Waheed (born 1994), Pakistani cricketer
- Umar Walasma (died 1276), Sultan of Ifat
- Umar Wirahadikusumah (1924–2003)), Vice President of Indonesia
- Umar Yusuf Yabo, Nigerian politician
- Umar Zahir (born 1963), Maldivian singer
- Umar Zahir (politician), (1936–2021), Maldivian politician
- Umar Farooq Zahoor (born 1975), Norwegian-born Pakistani businessman
- Umar Zango (born 1994), Nigerian footballer
