= Hauwa =

Hauwa is a feminine given name. It is the Northern Nigerian form of the Arabic name Hawwāʾ (حوّاء), which corresponds to the biblical Eve. Because many West African Muslims adopted personal names directly from Arabic, they retained features of classical pronunciation, including the geminated (long) w sound. It is especially common among the Hausa people. Notable people with the name include:

- Hauwa Ali (died 1995), Nigerian novelist
- Hauwa Allahbura, Nigerian actress and film producer
- Hauwa Ibrahim (born 1968), Nigerian human rights lawyer
- Hauwa Ojeifo (born 1992), Nigerian sexual violence and mental health activist
- Hauwa Muhammed Sadique (born 1969), Nigerian engineer
