= Nigerian Academy of Engineering =

Nigerian Academy of Engineering was founded in 1997 by concerned professional Nigerian engineers, with the aim to promote engineering training and practice in Nigeria as an effort to improve the technological growth of Nigeria as a developing country in West-Africa. The Academy was described as a Think Tank for Engineering and Technology in Nigeria with focus on researches and studies across the field of engineering.The academy website is NAE

== Notable members ==
Members of the academy are distinguish Nigerian engineers. Presently there are 143 members across all disciplines in engineering. Notable members of the Academy includes:

- Akinsola Olusegun Faluyi
- Abubakar Sani Sambo
- Danladi Slim Matawal
- Ebele Ofunneamaka Okeke
- Edet James Amana
- Ernest Ndukwe
- Eli Jidere Bala
- Franklin Erepamo Osaisai
- Joseph Atubokiki Ajienka
- Micheal Oladimeji Faborede
- Nicholas Agiobi Damachi
- Oyewusi Ibidapo Obe
- Ogbonnaya Onu
- Olawale Adeniji Ige
- Azikiwe Peter Onwualu
- Rahmon Ade Bello
- Samuel Olatunde Fadahunsi
- Salihu Mustafa
- Umar Buba Bindir

== See also ==
- List of notable engineers in Nigeria
