= Akinlabi =

- Language: Yoruba

Origin
- Meaning: We have given birth to the brave one
- Region of origin: West Africa

Akinlabí is a Yoruba given name and surname meaning "We have given birth to the brave one", "It is a brave one we gave birth to".

Notable people with this name include:

Given name

- Akinlabi Olasunkanmi, Nigerian businessman and politician
- Marvin Olawale Akinlabi Park, Spanish professional footballer

Surname

- Godman Akinlabi, Nigerian pastor
- Peter Akinlabi, Nigerian table tennis player
- Stephen A. Akinlabi, a Nigerian mechanical engineer and academic.
