= Ibrahim Khaleel Inuwa =

Nigerian engineer and politician (1949–2020)

Commissioner
- In office December 1986 – February 1989

Chairman (Technovation Limited)

Personal details
- Born: 15 April 1949 Kano State, Nigeria
- Died: 11 May 2020 (aged 71) Kano State
- Education: Ahmadu Bello University Cranfield University
- Occupation: Politician, engineer, consultant
- Profession: Automobile engineering

Ibrahim Khaleel Inuwa, also known as Engineer IK Inuwa, was a Nigerian politician, Kano State consultant, and a member of the Debate Coordinating Committee, that was chaired by Justice Niki Tobi on the Constitution of Nigeria (1999).

== Early life and education ==
Inuwa was born in Gwale Local Government Area of Kano State, Nigeria, on 15 April 1949. He received his primary education at Kofar Kudu Junior Primary School, Emir's Palace, and at Kano State, from 1956 to 1959, before later attending Gwale Senior Primary School in Kano from 1960 to 1962. Inuwa attended the Government College in California from 1963 to 1967, where he received the West Africa School Certificate. In 1968, he attended Rumfa College, Kano, and earned his Cambridge Higher School Certificate in 1969.

He then obtained a Master of Science in Automobile Engineering in 1978 from Cranfield University, Bedford, England.

== Career ==
Inuwa spent time with the National Youth Service Corps from 1973 to 1974 before working with the Kano State Civil Service Commission (CSC) as a mechanical engineer until 1976. Between 1980 and 1984, he was the assistant chief engineer and chief engineer in the Nigerian Ministry of Rural and Community Development.

During the Administration of Group Captain in December 1986, he was appointed to the post of commissioner and served in the Kano State Ministry of Rural and Community Development. Kano State is responsible for implementing the Directorate of Foods, Roads and Rural Infrastructures, Community Development, small-scale industries, and rural electrification programs. In October 1988, during the administration of Colonel Idris Garba, he was posted to the newly established Ministry of Animal Health and Forestry, which was responsible for resuscitating livestock production in the State, as well as implementing the afforestation program.

After serving as commissioner, Inuwa returned to the Kano State Agricultural Rural Development Authority (KNARDA) in February 1989, eventually serving as the director of engineering before retiring from the Kano State Civil Service. Following his retirement, Inuwa started a company called Technovation Limited, where he worked throughout the remainder of his life.

Inuwa was president of the Nigerian Society of Engineers from January 1989 to December 1990 and president of the Council for the Regulation of Engineering in Nigeria (COREN) between April 1991 and December 1994.

He served as a Member of the Presidential Task Force on the reactivation of Nigeria National Paper Manufacturing Company from April 1991 to December 1992. Inuwa then served as a Board Member for the National Agency for Science and Engineering Infrastructure (NASENI) between July 1992 and August 1994. Most recently, he was Trustee of the Kano Peace and Development Initiative (KAPEDI) between 2010 and 2020.

During the administration of President General Abdulsalami Abubakar, he was a member of the 1999 Constitution Debate Coordinating Committee chaired by Justice Niki Tobi.

== Awards ==
Inuwa received the Order of the Federal Republic (OFR) on 20 December 2005. He was also a recipient of the Nigerian Society of Engineers Merit Awards the following years: 1983, 1997, 2001, 2004, 2007, and 2008.

Additionally, he was a recipient of the Council for the Regulation of Engineering in Nigeria (COREN) Distinguished Merit Award for Excellence (Distinguished Service to Technology) in 1997.

Inuwa was granted the Lagos State Polytechnic Fellowship award in January 2005.
