= Ernest Ndukwe =

Nigerian electrical engineer

Ernest Chukwuka-Anene Ndukwe

Chief Executive Officer of the Nigerian Communications Commission
- In office February 2000 – March 2010

Personal details
- Born: 2 September 1948 (age 78) Anambra State, Nigeria

Chairman, MTN Nigeria Communications Plc

Ernest Ndukwe OFR (born 2 September 1948) is a Nigerian electrical engineer and former Chief Executive Officer of the Nigerian Communications Commission, NCC.

== Life and career ==
He was born 2 September 1948. He obtained a Bachelor of science (B.sc) degree in Electronic and Electrical Engineering from University of Ife (now Obafemi Awolowo University), Ile Ife in 1975. He later proceeded to Harris Corporation Training School, Melbourne, Florida where he received a certificate in Satellite communication (1977). He later participated in the Chief Executive Programme (CEP) at Lagos Business School in 1994.

He began his professional career with Radio Communications Nigeria (RCN) Limited in 1976. He left for an in-service training while in the service of the Radio Communications Nigeria to the United States in August 1976 to Harris Corporation in Melbourne, Florida.

He returned to Nigeria in August 1977 to continue his service with Radio Communications Nigeria (RCN) where he rose to the position of a maintenance supervisor in 1978 and later assistant engineering manager in 1979.

He was appointed as President of the Association of Telecommunications Companies of Nigeria (ATCON). He started his career with GEC Telecommunications as Engineering manager is 1980 and quickly rose to become the Commercial Director of the company in 1988 and Managing Director of the company in 1989.

He was later appointed as Executive Vice Chairman and Chief Executive Officer of the Nigerian Communications Commission in February 2000 by Olusegun Obasanjo, the former President of the Federal Republic of Nigeria. After his initial tenure, he was re-appointed for a second term of five years. He proceeded to preside over the building of an internationally respected institution earning a reputation as a strong, transparent and open regulatory agency. Under his tenure at the Nigerian Communications Commission (NCC), the ICT industry witnessed tremendous growth and transformation, leading to what has been generally referred to as the era of Nigeria’s Telecommunication Revolution.

Dr Ndukwe is currently chairman of Openmedia Group as well as a part-time Faculty at the Lagos Business School where he heads the Centre for Infrastructure Policy, Regulation and Advancement, CIPRA. He is also on the board of ICT Research Africa Network. He was appointed as Independent Non-Executive Director of access bank Plc in 2013. He is also on the board of Systemspecs Ltd as a non-executive Director. He is currently the board chairman, MTN Nigeria.

== Official duties ==
- He served as Chairman of the Administrative Council of the African Telecommunications Union
- Chairman of the West African Telecom Regulators Assembly (WATRA)
- Vice Chairman of the Telecom Development Advisory Group of the International Telecommunication Union representing Nigeria
- He had served on the Presidential Committee on job creation
- He served as Co-chairman of the Presidential Committee to develop Strategy and Roadmap for universal Broadband Access for Nigeria.

== Awards and fellowships ==
- Officer of the Order of the Federal Republic
- Fellow of the Nigerian Society of Engineers
- Fellow of the Nigerian Institute of Management Technology
- Fellow of the Nigerian Academy of Engineering.
- Dr Ndukwe is a recipient of five honorary doctorate degrees from various universities.
- He was also decorated in 2014 at the World Telecom Development Conference (WTDC) with the ITU Gold Medal Award “in recognition of his important contribution to global Information and Communications Technologies and to the work of ITU”
- Dr. Ndukwe is a recipient of the Zik’s prize for leadership Award
- Distinguished Excellence Award by Nigeria IT Professionals in the Americas for outstanding contribution towards the improvement of the Communications Industry in Nigeria;
- Distinguished Merit Award by the Nigerian Society of Engineers;
- Distinguished Leadership Award by Leadership Watch organization for the transparent and professional handling of the digital mobile Licensing Auction;
- Lagos Business School Alumni Association Award for outstanding contributions to the Telecommunications Industry;
- Distinguished Alumnus Award by Obafemi Awolowo University Alumni Association;
- Nigerian Achievers Award 2003 for outstanding contribution to the Communications industry;
- Man of the Year Award 2002 and 2006 by Nigerian Information Technology and Telecom Awards (NIITA) for exemplary courage in presiding over the organisation of the most transparent spectrum auction exercise in Africa;
- Obafemi Awolowo University Technology Hall of Fame Inductee 2005
- 2006 Best Regulator of the year award by Thisday Newspapers, February 2007
- Man of the Year Award 2007 by the National Daily Newspaper for his outstanding leadership role in the telecom industry.
- Best Pan African Regulator of All Time Award by NITTA Awards in 2008
- Award of Excellence For meritorious and Immense contribution to The Growth and Development of The Telecommunication Industry in Nigeria by The Justice Chambers, Faculty of Law, Obafemi Awolowo University, Ile-Ife, 2008
- African Regulator of the year for 2008 by Satcom Stars Awards.
- African Regulator of the year 2009 by Satcom Stars Awards
- Certificate of excellence for outstanding contribution to public office by Africa Business Awards 2009 organised by African Business Magazine and the Commonwealth Business Council.
- Obafemi Awolowo University Distinguished Alumni Award “ In Recognition of His Immense Contributions to ICT Development in Nigeria”
- Lifetime Achievement Award, Titans of Tech Awards 2024

== See also ==
- List of notable engineers in Nigeria
