= Xena Workwear =

Women's protective footwear company in Milwaukee, Wisconsin

- Company type: Private
- Industry: Footwear / Apparel
- Founded: 2019
- Founder: Ana Kraft
- Headquarters: Milwaukee, Wisconsin
- Products: Women's Work Boots, Safety, and Steel Toe Shoes
- Website: https://xenaworkwear.com

Xena Workwear is a Milwaukee-based women owned company that makes stylish women's work boots and safety shoes. The company primarily designs fashionable steel-toe shoes just for women.

== History ==
In 2017, the founder of Xena Workwear, Anastasia (Ana) Kraft, came upon the idea to start a women's workwear company while working as a project manager in the manufacturing industry. In 2019, Xena Workwear was accepted into the accelerator program gBETA run by Madison-based gener8tor. In May 2019, the company launched its first ASTM-certified product, the Gravity steel-toe safety shoe. Shortly afterwards, Xena Workwear closed a $750,000 seed round led by Chicago-based Starting Line.

== Description ==
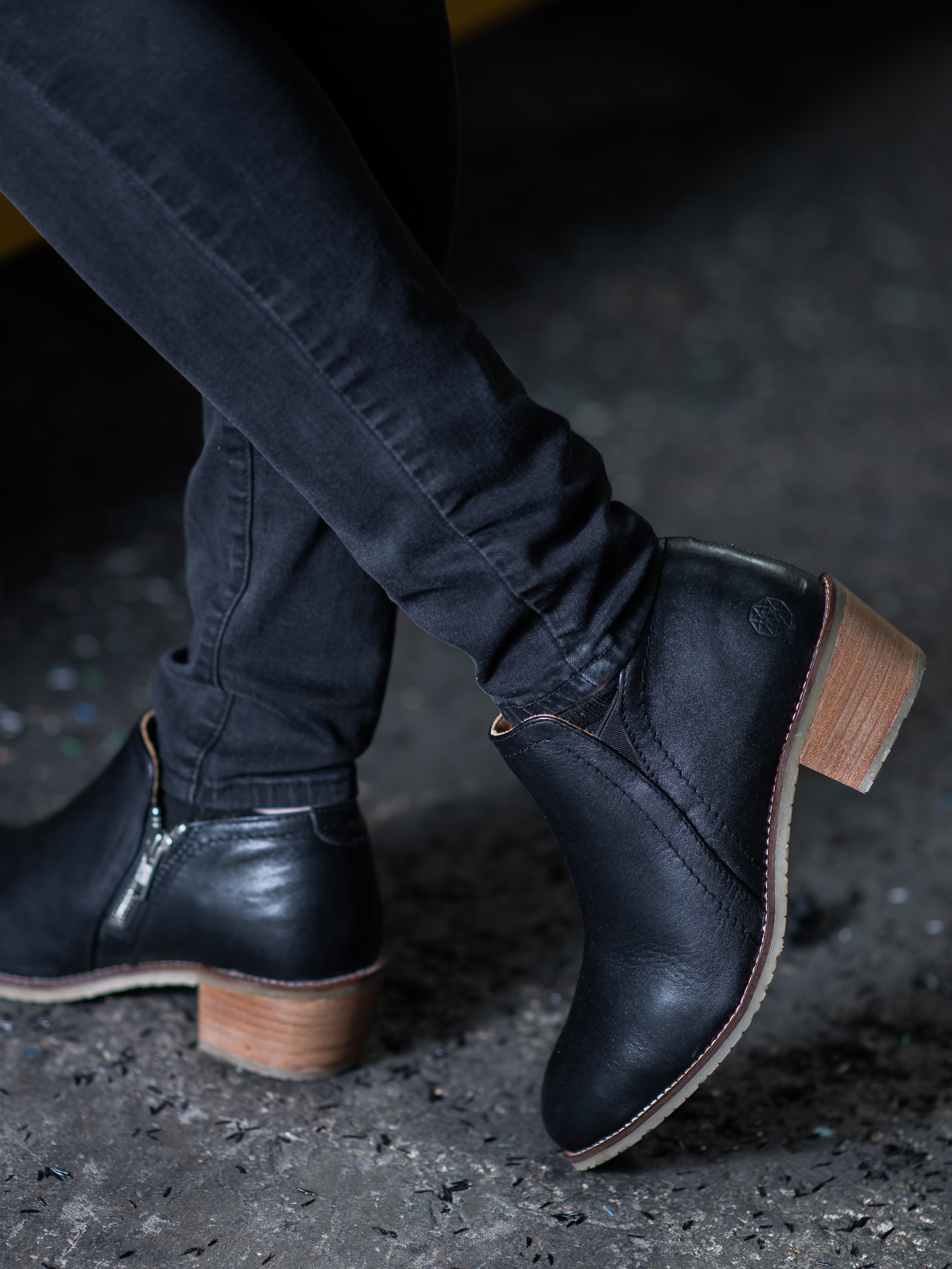
The Gravity low-cut boots

Xena Workwear develops shoes for women working in non-traditional industries. The company uses Leather Working Group (LWG) certified leather in their products.

== Partnerships & Endorsements ==
Xena Workwear is an official partner and sponsor of the National Association of Women in Construction (NAWIC) and Women in Manufacturing (WIM).

The company also partners with organizations which further the mission of inspiring more women to explore careers in STEM and trades:

- Reinvented Magazine - an organization focused on reinventing the general perception of women in STEM fields
- Beauty and the Bolt - an organization teaching that engineering and femininity are not mutually exclusive
- Her STEM Story - an organization sharing stories of female STEM professionals from around the world

In 2019, the company was endorsed by the Society of Women Engineers (SWE) FY20 President.

Xena Workwear is featured in the following publications, among others:

- Metalforming Magazine - January 2020
- Quartz - February 2020
- Chemical & Engineering News - April 2020
- Steel Times International - May 2020

The company was listed as a top 20 Wisconsin startup to watch in 2020 by Wisconsin Inno.
