= Ibilola =

Ibilola is both a given name and a surname. Notable people with the name include:

- Ibilola Amao, Nigerian and British engineer
- Aaron Ibilola (born 1997), Beninese footballer
