= Oyinkansola =

- Gender: Unisex
- Language: Yoruba

Origin
- Origin: Nigeria
- Meaning: "Honey drips into wealth or Sweetness is dropped into wealth"
- Region of origin: South-west Nigeria

Oyinkansola (meaning "honey drips into wealth" or "sweetness is dropped into wealth") is a Yoruba unisex given name.

== Notable people with the name ==
- Oyinkansola Abayomi (1897–1990), Nigerian nationalist and feminist
- Oyinkansola "foza" Fawehinmi, Nigerian entertainment lawyer
- Oyinkansola Sarah Aderibigbe (born 2002), Nigerian singer and songwriter known professionally as Ayra Starr
