= Rahmon Ade Bello =

Nigerian academic

Rahmon Ade bello

11th Vice Chancellor of the University of Lagos
- In office May 2012 – November 2017 acting May 2012 – November 2012
- Deputy: Professor Babajide Alao (academic); Professor Duro Oni (management)
- Preceded by: Babatunde Adetokunbo Sofoluwe
- Succeeded by: Oluwatoyin Ogundipe

Personal details
- Born: October 1948 (age 77) Ogun State, Nigeria
- Party: Non-Partisan

Rahmon Ade bello (born October 1948) is a Nigerian professor of Chemical Engineering, educational administrator and former vice chancellor of the University of Lagos, Nigeria.

== Early life and education ==
Rahmon was born in October 1948 in Ogun State, southwestern Nigeria. He was educated at Egbado College in Ilaro, a town in Ogun State. He proceeded to the Polytechnic of Ibadan, where he received an OND in mechanical engineering. In 1974, he obtained a Bachelor of Science (B.Sc.) degree in chemical engineering from the Obafemi Awolowo University. He holds a master's degree in chemical engineering from the University of Waterloo and doctorate degree (Ph.D.) from the same university

== Career ==
He was appointed as the acting vice chancellor of the University of Lagos in May 2012 following the sudden death of the then incumbent vice chancellor, professor Babatunde Adetokunbo Sofoluwe, who died of heart attack in 2012. In November 2012, Rahmon was confirmed as the vice chancellor of the university, a position he held till November 2017.

He is a fellow of several professional bodies like the Nigerian Academy of Engineering, Nigerian Society of Engineers, Nigerian Society of Chemical Engineers and a COREN registered engineer.

== See also ==
- Babatunde Adetokunbo Sofoluwe
- List of vice chancellors in Nigeria
- University of Lagos
