= Idiat Amusu =

Nigerian Female Engineer

- Born: 1952 (age 73–74); Kano
- Citizenship: Nigerian
- Education: Bcs in Agricultural Engineering
- Occupation: Engineer
- Organization: Council for Regulation of Engineering in Nigeria(COREN)
- Notable work: Founding members of the Association of Professional Women Engineers of Nigeria (APWEN)

Idiat Aderemi Amusu (born 27 November 1952, in Kano) is a Nigerian engineer. She is the first female agricultural engineer in Nigeria and the first female council member of the Council for the Regulation noof Engineering in Nigeria (COREN). She was among the original founding members of the Association of Professional Women Engineers of Nigeria (APWEN) in 1983. She was also the fourth President of the Association of Professional Women Engineers of Nigeria (APWEN).

== Education ==
She attended St Theresa College, Ibadan and Baptist High School, Iwo where she finished her secondary education. She proceeded to University of Nigeria Nsukka and obtained BSc in agricultural engineering in 1977. She graduated with a second class Upper Division and became the first female graduate of agricultural engineering in Nigeria. She later acquired a Postgraduate Diploma and a Masters in Food Science and Technology. She is a Fellow of Nigerian Society of Engineers, Fellow of the Nigerian Institution of Agriculture Engineers and Fellow of the Nigerian Institute of Food Science and Technology.

== Career ==
After her graduation, Amusu participated in the mandatory National Youth Service Corps (NYSC) in Ibadan between 1977 and 1978. Thereafter she joined ADFARM Ltd, Alakuko as a general manager. Her duties at the farm involved managing 45 acres of farmland. Between 2007 and 2009, Amusu proceeded on sabbatical at Moshood Abiola Polytechnic, Abeokuta, Ogun State Nigeria.

Amusu taught mathematics and physics at Epe Grammar School, Epe Lagos and subsequently at Our Lady of Apostles Secondary School, Yaba, Lagos. In 1982, she moved to Yaba College of Technology, Lagos where she taught engineering mathematics. Yaba College of Technology is the first tertiary institution in Nigeria. She was the head of the Department of Food Technology from 1996 to 1998. Subsequently, she was elevated to be the pioneer Dean, School of Technology, Yaba College of Technology where she served between 1998 and 2002. She retired as Head of Department of Agricultural Technology, Yaba College of Technology.

Amusu has served as a member of the accreditation committee of the National Board for Technical Education that accredited many polytechnics institutions in Nigeria. She has also served as an external assessor to Raw Material Research and Development Council of Nigeria; Lagos State Polytechnics, Technical Journal of the National Board for Technical Education and to the Federal Polytechnics Offa. Amusu is the first female council member of the Council for the Regulation of Engineering in Nigeria. She has also served as a council member of Nigerian Society of Engineers; she is one of the founding members of the Association of Professional Women Engineers in Nigeria (APWEN) and was the fourth President of the Association. She is a Fellow of Nigerian Society of Engineers, Fellow of the Nigerian Institution of Agricultural Engineers and Fellow of the Nigerian Institute of Food Science and Technology. Amusu has a special interest in fabrication and reverse engineering. In 2018, the national body of APWEN honoured her in Abeokuta for her contributions to engineering through its national ‘Invent, in Built’ campaign.

In recognition of her service, the Nigerian Society of Engineers, Ikeja Lagos branch dedicated its annual competition, Project Skill Competition, in her honour. The Skill Competition is organized for secondary schools students in Lagos State. The 2019 competition is held on 15 May 2019 at the Olu Awoyinfa Hall of the Ikeja Branch Secretariat in Lagos.
