= Nicholas Agiobi Damachi =

Nigerian politician and academic

Permanent Secretary of the Nigerian Ministry of Defence
- Incumbent
- Assumed office March 2012

Permanent Secretary of the Nigerian Federal Ministry of Education
- In office October 2006 – March 2012

Personal details
- Born: 16 March 1953 (age 73) Obudu, Cross River State, Nigeria
- Party: Non-partisian

Nicholas Agiobi Damachi, OON (Born 16 March 1953, Obudu, Cross River State, Nigeria) is a Nigerian professor of Industrial engineering and former Permanent Secretary of the Nigerian Federal Ministry of Education. He is currently the incumbent Permanent Secretary of the Nigerian Ministry of Defence.

== Early life ==
Professor Damachi was born on 16 March 1953 in Obudu, a Local Government Area of Cross River State, an area known for the Obudu Cattle Ranch which is one of the Nigeria's Mountain resort. He had his secondary education at Mary Knoll Secondary School, Ogoja in Cross River State, Nigeria where he wrote the West African Senior School Certificate Examination in 1970. In 1976, he obtained a Bachelor of Science (B. sc) degree in Industrial engineering and a Master of Science (M. sc) degree in Systems engineering from Ohio State University (1978). He later attended the University of Cincinnati for a Doctorate degree, Ph.D in Industrial engineering.

== Career ==
He began his career in 1977 as a system engineer with the Technical Services Group of the Division of Water, City of Columbia, Ohio before he joined the services of the University of Cincinnati as a research associate and instructor. In 1966, he became an adjunct professor of Industrial and Manufacturing Engineering at the Department of Mechanical, Industrial and Nuclear Engineering of the University of Cincinnati. His research interest in engineering focuses on system analysis, technical management and water related researches, such as water utility system modeling. In 1983, he returned to Nigeria and was appointed as General Manager in a dredging and Marine company called Lamic Nig. Ltd. Few years later, he joined the Nigerian Civil Service where he was appointed as Permanent Secretary of the Nigerian Federal Ministry of Education in October 2006 After his tenure as Permanent Secretary of the Nigerian Federal Ministry of Education in March 2012, he was again appointed as the Permanent Secretary of the Nigerian Ministry of Defence

He became an adjunct professor in 1976 and not 1966

== Awards and fellowships ==
He is a receiver of several awards and fellowships. Few among other includes:

- Officer of the Order of the Niger, awarded by the president of the Federal Republic of Nigeria
- Fellow of the Nigerian Academy of Science
- Fellow of the Nigerian Society of Engineers.
- Fellow of the Institute of Industrial Engineers (I. I. E)
- Fellow of the Industrial Engineering Society (Alpha Pi Mu)
- Fellow of the Scientific Research Society (Sigma Xi).
- Fellow of the American Society of Quality Control
- Member of Tri-State Human Factors Society
- Member of Board of Trustees, Cincinnati Free Store Member
- Fellow of the Nigerian Institute of Industrial Engineers (N. I. I. E)
- Member of the Council for the Regulation of Engineering in Nigeria, COREN.

== See also ==
- List of notable engineers in Nigeria
