= APWEN =

Nigerian professional association

The Association of Professional Women Engineers of Nigeria (APWEN) was established in 1982 by Nigerian engineer Joana Maduka. It is a division of the Nigerian Society of Engineers (NSE).

According to the body's leadership, APWEN was founded by six women and now has a membership of over 3,000 people with chapters in 35 cities, and collegiate in 16 campuses in all six geopolitical zones of Nigeria.

APWEN advocates the inclusion of females in the engineering sector, by educating them to contribute to the production sector of the economy.

The chairman of the Ota chapter, Dr. Imhade Okokpujie — during the 2021/2022 executives' inauguration — was quoted to have said, "Nigeria, as it stands, lacks involvement in that aspect of production engineering, hence the need to answer the question, 'What do Nigeria produce?' This is why women's development will be a catalyst for national development, hence, the need for more mentorship and encouragement for the girl child to study engineering."

APWEN advocates for more female representation in STEM courses and projects in the engineering field by organising programs that encourage young girls in high schools and colleges, as well as promote women considered prominent in various engineering fields. Some of their programs include scholarships to young females. The award programme is often in conjunction with other bodies and corporations.
