= Ibijoke =

Nigerian Given Name

Ìbíjọkẹ́
- Gender: Female
- Language: Yoruba

Origin
- Language: Nigerian
- Meaning: One who family jointly pampers
- Region of origin: Southwest

Other names
- Variant forms: Àjọkẹ́, Àdéjọ́kẹ́, Àládéjọ̀kẹ́, Àjọ̀kẹ́àdé, Gbanejọ̀kẹ́, Ifájọ̀kẹ́, Oyéjọ̀kẹ́
- Short form: Jọkẹ́

Ìbíjọ̀kẹ́ audiois a Nigerian given name of Yoruba descent meaning "One that family jointly pampers". It has its diminutive form to be 'Jọkẹ́' meaning (Jointly pampered). Other variants of Ìbíjọkẹ́ are, Ájọ̀kẹ́ (One who is jointly pampered), Ádéjọ̀kẹ́ (The crown pampers this one, together), Áládéjọ̀kẹ́ (The crowned heads jointly care for this one), Ájọ̀kẹ́ádé (Jointly caring for the crown), Ifájọ̀kẹ́ (One Ifá joins in to care for), Oyéjọ̀kẹ́ (The honored gathers to cherish this one), Gbanejọ̀kẹ́ (Multitudes care for this one) etc.

== Notable people bearing the name ==
- Ibijoke Sanwoolu, Lagos State First Lady
- Ibijoke Faborode, Nigerian Women's Right Activist
- Ibijoke Patricia Byron, Academic
