= Ifedayo (name) =

Nigerian given name

Ifetdao
- Gender: Male
- Language: Yoruba

Origin
- Origin: Yoruba
- Meaning: "(My) love has turned to joy.”
- Region of origin: South-west Nigeria

Other names
- Variant forms: Ife; Dayo

Ifedayo is a Nigerian given name of Yoruba origin, commonly used among the Yoruba people in southwestern Nigeria. The name is composed of three Yoruba words: “Ife” (love), “di” (become), and “ayo” (joy or happiness). Together, Ifedayo translates to “(My) love has turned to joy.” Morphologically, it is written as ifẹ́-di-ayọ̀.

== Notable people with the given name ==
- Ifedayo Akintunde –Nigerian engineer.
- Ifedayo Adetifa – Nigerian paediatrician
- Ifedayo Olusegun – Nigerian footballer
- Ifedayo Oladapo – Nigerian professor
