= Akinsola Olusegun Faluyi =

President of the Nigerian Society of Engineers (NSE)
- In office 1985–1986

President of the Council for the Regulation of Engineering (COREN)

Personal details
- Born: 13 November 1934 (age 91)

Akinsola Olusegun Faluyi (born 13 November 1934) is a Nigerian mechanical engineer and former President of COREN, an engineering regulation body in Nigeria.

== Life and career ==
His middle name "Olusegun" translates to "God is Victorious" in Yoruba He attended Ibadan Boys High School, Oyo State, Nigeria where he obtained the West Africa School Certificate (WASC) and later proceeded to Loughborough University where he obtained a first degree (B.Eng) in Mechanical engineering (1953-1985). He joined the service of the University College Hospital, University of Ibadan as Hospital Engineer in 1960. He left the teaching hospital after two years of services as hospital engineer, to join the Lagos University Teaching Hospital (LUTH) in 1962 as Chief Engineer. In 1975, he retired from LUTH in 1975 to join Edison Group and Partners. He became the President of the Nigerian Society of Engineers (NSE) in 1985 and served in that capacity for one year, a tenure that ended in 1986. He later became the president of COREN. He also served as President of the Nigerian Academy of Engineering.

== Fellowship ==
- Fellow, Nigerian Society of Engineers (NSE)
- Fellow, Nigerian Academy of Engineering

== See also ==
- University of Lagos
