= Babajide Agunbiade =

Nigerian engineer

- Born: Babajide Ademola Agunbiade; April 16 1972; Ibadan
- Citizenship: Nigerian American
- Education: University of Ibadan; American Intercontinental University; Higher Place Christian University; Texas Southern University
- Occupation: Engineer
- Known for: his contributions to the offshore oil and gas industry
- Spouse: Olufunke Agunbiade

Babajide Ademola Agunbiade (born April 16 1972) is a Nigerian engineer, businessman, and philanthropist known for his contributions to the Offshore Oil and Gas Industry. He is the Chief Executive Officer of Alpha Energy Resources, and was formerly a director at General Electric (GE) Oil & Gas and the Executive Director at National Oilwell Varco. He is one of the only 13 subject matter experts globally in subsea production systems.

He is also known as the Atobaase of Yorubaland, a Royal Title conferred on him by His imperial Majesty, Oba (Dr) Lamidi Olayiwola Adeyemi III, Alaafin of Oyo for his contribution to the development of Yoruba land on the August 28, 2020 and a fellow of the Nigerian Society of Engineers.

== Early life and education ==
Agunbiade was born in Ibadan, Oyo State, into the family of Mr Solomon Emiola Agunbiade from Fiditi and Mrs. Mary Olufunke Agunbiade from Ibadan. He holds a bachelor's degree in Industrial and Production Engineering from the University of Ibadan in 1996 and later earned a master's degree in System Engineering from GE Edison Advanced Engineering Development Program in Crotonville, USA.

== Career ==
Agunbiade began his professional journey in Nigeria at Industrial Measurements & Control and then Subsea Engineer at Texaco Oversea Houston before joining General Electric (G.E.) where he served as Principal Engineer in the Gasification Business Unit and later as Managing Director of G.E. Power and Gasification for West Africa where he led the team that designed the 618-megawatt Integrated Gasification Combined Cycle (IGCC) plant at Duke Energy’s Edwardsport Station in Indiana, the largest and cleanest IGCC plant in the world. He then moved to National Oilwell Varco (NOV) where he served as General Manager for Africa and the Gulf of Mexico before advancing to Director of Business Development for the Subsea Production System business group.

In 2020, he founded Alpha Energy Resources, an engineering, procurement, construction, and installation service provider in the oil and gas sector of Sub-Sahara Africa. In 2024, his company Alpha Petroleum secured the largest diamond mining contract worth US$200 million in the Republic of Namibia which was a joint venture between De Beers Group and the Namibian government.

In 2024, he joined the board of director of Mobihealth, a telemedicine and digital health service provider. In May 2021, at the 17th Nigerian Society of Engineers Ceremony, he was conferred as a fellow of the Nigerian Society of Engineers (FNSE).

== Philanthropy ==
Agunbiade is the founder and president of the Jide Agunbiade Foundation, a private charity foundation. The primary goal of the foundation is to uplift families across Nigeria providing primary healthcare, access to basic education and community development. His donations include water systems donation, library in the U.S. and Nigeria and in 2023 became the first diaspora alumnus to donate £6,000 to his Alma mater, the University of Ibadan Institution Alumni Trust Fund following the 70th anniversary of the university and has raised over 100m Naira to support secondary education across Nigeria among others support.

== Personal life ==
He is married to Yeye Funke Agunbiade, CEO of Sifax Shipping and Logistics in Houston and they have children. In 2020, he was conferred as the Atobaase of Yorubaland, a Royal Title conferred on him by His imperial Majesty, Oba (Dr) Lamidi Olayiwola Adeyemi iii, Alaafin of Oyo for his contribution to the development of Yoruba land and also the Asiwaju of Fiditi conferred on him by His Royal Majesty, Alayeluwa, Oba Sakiru Oyewole Akanni Adekola Oyelere, Ajani -Eedu II, Agbadewolu I, OniFiditi Of Fiditi

On November 12, 2021, Congresswoman Sheila Jackson Lee shared a proclamation marking the day "Atobasse Dr. Babajide Agunbiade and Yeye Atobasse of Yorubaland Day in Texas' 18th Congressional District," recognizing the couple as "strong pillars" in the community.
