= Eli Jidere Bala =

Nigerian professor of mechanical engineering

Former Director-General of the Energy Commission of Nigeria (ECN).
- In office 5 May 2013 – 5 May 2023

Rector of Abubakar Tatari Ali Polytechnic, Bauchi State, Nigeria.
- In office 1993–1994

Director of Renewable Energy Department of the Energy Commission of Nigeria.
- In office 2006–2012

Personal details
- Born: 19 September 1954 (age 71) Gombe State, Nigeria
- Party: Non-Partisan.

Eli Jidere Bala (born 19 September 1954) is a Nigerian professor of Mechanical engineering and the Director-General of the Energy Commission of Nigeria.

== Life and career ==
He was born on 19 September 1954 in Gelengu, a city in Balanga Local Government Area of Gombe State, Nigeria. He attended the prestigious Ahmadu Bello University, Zaria where he obtained a Bachelor of Engineering (B.Eng.) degree in mechanical engineering in 1977 and a Master of Engineering (M.Eng.) degree in mechanical engineering in 1980. He later proceeded to Cranfield Institute of Technology, United Kingdom where he won a Doctor of Philosophy (PhD) degree in applied energy in 1984. He joined the services of Ahmadu Bello University as a graduate assistant in 1978 and was appointed Senior Lecturer in 1987 and later became a professor of applied energy in 2004.

== Official duties ==
He has held several administrative position in the country. He served as the Head of the Department of Mechanical Engineering, Ahmadu Bello University, Zaria between 1991 and 1993 and was reappointed in 1997, a tenure that lasted for two years (1997-1999). After four years, he was reappointed for the third time in 2003, a tenure that ended in 2006. After his first tenure as the Head of the Department of Mechanical Engineering, Ahmadu Bello University, he was appointed as the Rector of Abubakar Tatari Ali Polytechnic, Bauchi State, Nigeria, a tenure that lasted for 4 years (1993 - 1997). He then returned to Ahmadu Bello University where he was reappointed as Head of the Department of Mechanical Engineering He also served as the Deputy Director of Energy Planning and Analysis Department of the Energy Commission of Nigeria (1999-2003). He was later appointed as Director of Renewable Energy of the Energy Commission of Nigeria, a position he held from 2006 to 2012. Before his appointment as the acting Director-General of the Energy Commission of Nigeria (January 2013- May 2013).

- Director-General of the Energy Commission of Nigeria (May 2013- till May 2023).

== Fellowship and membership ==
- Fellow of the Nigerian Society of Engineers|Nigeria Society of Engineers
- Fellow of the Nigerian Academy of Engineering
- Member of Solar Energy Society of Nigeria
- Member of the Council for the Regulation of Engineering in Nigeria.
- Member of the Nigerian Institute of Mechanical Engineers
- Member of the International Association of Energy Economics

== See also ==
- List of notable engineers in Nigeria
