= Joseph Ajienka =

Nigerian academic

Joseph Atubokiki Ajienka

7th Vice chancellor of University of Port Harcourt

Personal details
- Born: 10 January 1955 (age 71) Rivers State, Nigeria
- Party: Non-Partisan
- Website: Official website

Joseph Atubokiki Ajienka (born 10 January 1955) is a Nigerian professor of Petroleum engineering, educational administrator and the seventh vice chancellor of University of Port Harcourt, Rivers State, Nigeria. Under his leadership, the University of Port Harcourt was ranked 6th in Africa and 1st in Nigeria in Research Influence by Times Higher Education (THE).

== Life and career ==
He was born on 10 January 1955 in Okrika, a metropolitan area and Local Government Area in Rivers State, Nigeria. He attended Okrika Boys’ School but obtained the West Africa School Certificate at Government Comprehensive Secondary School in Borokiri town, Port Harcourt. He obtained a bachelor's degree in Petroleum engineering from the University of Ibadan and master's degree and Doctorate (Ph. D) degree from the University of Port Harcourt in 1986 and 1990 respectively.

He began working in the University of Port Harcourt in 1982 as a graduate assistant in Department of Petroleum engineering where he was later appointed a professor of Petroleum engineering.

== Summary of major appointments and recognitions ==
- Chairman Association of Vice-Chancellors of Nigerian Universities (AVCNU), 2014/15
- Chairman Committee of Vice-Chancellors (CVC) of Federal Universities, 2014/15
- 7th Vice-Chancellor, University of Port Harcourt, 2010–2015
- Pioneer Director, Institute of Petroleum Studies (IPS), University of PH, 2003-2010
- Head of Department of Petroleum & Gas Engineering, 1995-1997
- Coordinator, M. Eng Environmental Engineering Programme, Faculty of Engineering, University of Port Harcourt, 2000-2003
- Emmanuel Egbogah Chair of Petroleum Engineering, University of Port Harcourt, 2005-present
- Member, Governing Council, University of Port Harcourt, 2006-2007
- Chairman, University of Port Harcourt Housing Committee, 2006-2010
- Member, Graduate School Board, University of Port Harcourt, 2002-2010
- Chairman, Graduate School Seminars & Lectures Committee, 2006-2010
- Chairman 25th Anniversary of the School of Graduate Studies, University of PH, 2008

== Fellowship and membership ==
- Fellow of the Nigerian Academy of Engineering
- Member of the Institute of Administrators and researchers of Nigeria
- Fellow Nigerian Society of Engineers
- Fellow, Nigerian Environmental Society
- Fellow, Nigerian Institute of Management
- Fellow, Institute of Safety Professionals of Nigeria
- Fellow, Institute of Petroleum Studies
- Fellow, Institute of Industrial Administration

== Honours and awards ==
- Paul Haris Fellow (Rotary Club), 2012
- Chieftaincy Title: Enyi Oha of Ebem Ohafia, 2012
- NREP Global Award of Professionalism in Higher Education (2009)
- Chairman Standard Organisation of Nigeria Committee on Petroleum Upstream (2009), elected
- Selected to attend TOTAL International Seminar on Energy & Education, November 2007, Paris
- SPE African Regional Award for Production and Operations, 2008
- Nigeria Petroleum Golden Jubilee Award of Excellence, (Who is Who in 50 years of Oil and Gas Production in Nigeria), August 2008 organised by Nigerian Energy Chronicles
- Rotary Club of Ogbor Hill Aba, 2000
- Letter of Commendation from the University of Port Harcourt Central Appointment & Promotion Committee (Academic) for brilliant performance at the interview for the post of professor
- Visiting Lecturer, Department of Fuel and Energy, University of Leeds, U.K., British Council sponsored University of Leeds/Uniport Energy Link (February 28 -March 31, 1992).
- Safety Ambassador, ISPON 2014 Safety Award
- Award of Honour, Faculty of Education, University of Port Harcourt, on the Occasion of 100 year of Education in Nigeria, November 11, 2014
- Pan-African Leaders Award, African Students Union Parliament, ASUP, Sept 2014
- Award of Honour, 3rd Registry Day Celebration, 29 October 2014
- Award of Excellence Centre for Gas, Refining & Petrochemicals, PH, 2014
- Recognition Award, Faculty of Agriculture, World Food Day, 2014
- Award of Excellence, Association of Medical Lab. Students, June 2014
- Award of Excellence by the Department of Theatre & Film Studies, Art Patron, 2014
- SSLT 3rd Induction Distinguished Service Award, March 2014
- Institute of Petroleum Studies 10th Anniversary Distinguished Service Award, 2013
- University of PH School of Graduate Studies Silver Jubilee Award of Excellence, 2008
- Institute of Petroleum Studies 5th Year Award of Excellence 2008
- University of Port Harcourt Alumni Award of Excellence, 2008
- Senior Staff Club Award of Excellence, 2004
- Award of Excellence (4 February 2004), National Assoc. of Delta State Graduate Students, Uniport
- SPE Uniport Chapter Service Award, 1996/97

== Family ==
Ajienka is married; he and his wife, Mercy, have children.

== See also ==
- List of vice chancellors in Nigeria
- University of Port Harcourt
