= Daere Akobo =

Nigerian entrepreneur and business executive

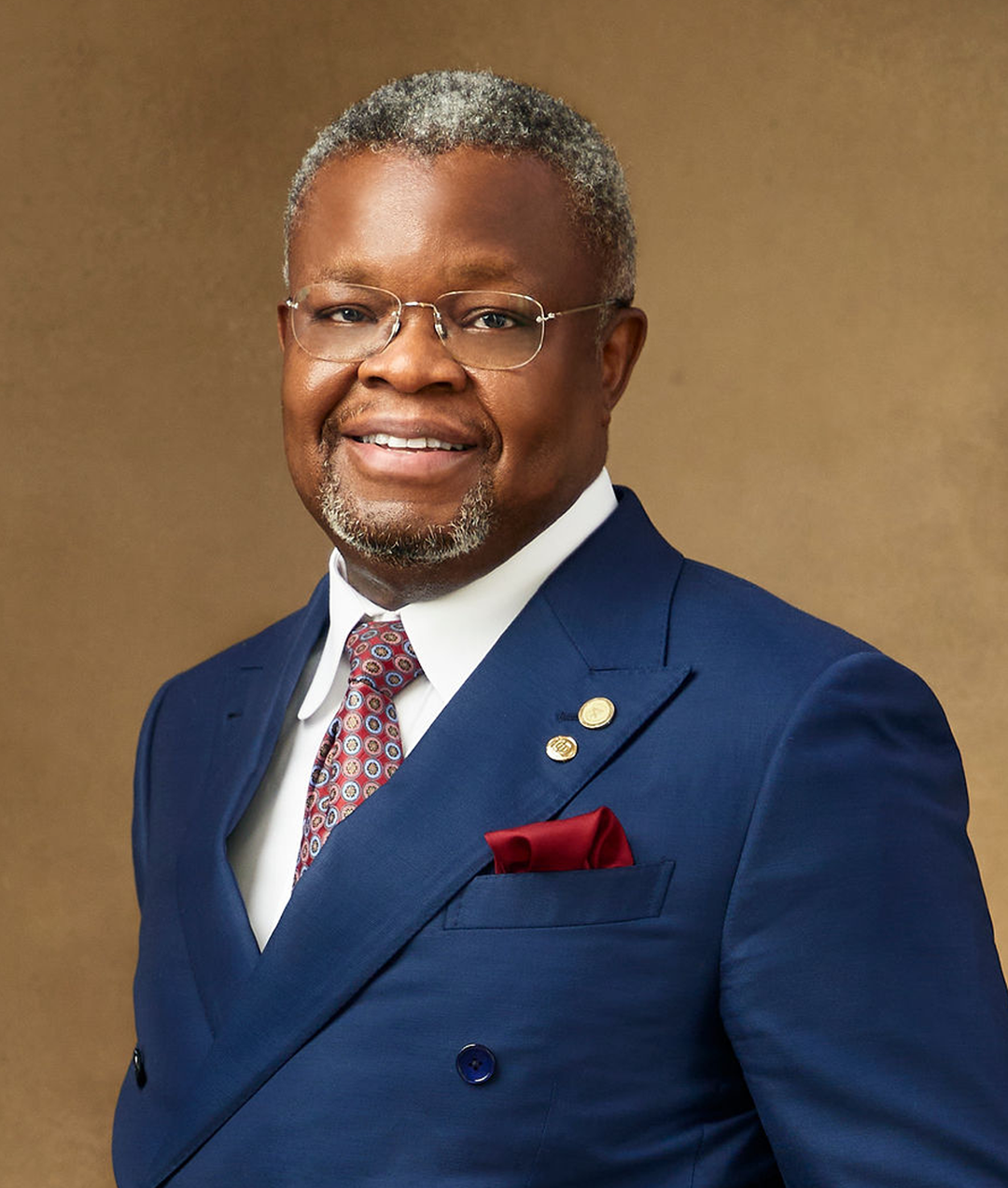
- Daere Afonya-a Akobo
- Born: Daere Afonya-a Akobo; 12 May 1973 (age 53); Port Harcourt, Rivers State, Nigeria
- Citizenship: Nigerian
- Education: Rivers State University (B.Sc. Applied Physics, 1997) Harvard Business School (Executive Education) INSEAD (Executive Education) Alliance Manchester Business School (Executive Education)
- Occupation: Entrepreneur · Business Executive
- Title: Chairman, PANA Holdings
- Spouse: Married
- Children: 4

Daere Afonya-a Akobo (born 12 May 1973) is a Nigerian entrepreneur and business executive. He is the founder and Chairman of PANA Holdings, a conglomerate with interests spanning the Petroleum industry, Energy, Infrastructure, Digital solutions, Financial services, and Agribusiness. He is also the founder and Chief Executive Officer of PE Energy Ltd, an oil and gas engineering and services company, and has established several other ventures, including AKD Consulting, and PANA Academy.

He has received industry and leadership recognitions, including the African Energy Person of the Year Award by African Leadership Magazine. Akobo is a Fellow of the Chartered Institute of Directors (London and Nigeria) and serves on advisory boards and committees linked to Nigeria’s energy sector, policy reform, and entrepreneurship.

== Early life and education ==
Akobo studied Applied Physics at Rivers State University of Science and Technology, where he earned a bachelor's degree in 1997. During his university years, he was noted for early leadership qualities and later pursued professional and executive education at institutions including Harvard Business School, INSEAD, and Alliance Manchester Business School. In 2024, Obafemi Awolowo University awarded Akobo an honorary doctorate in Business Management, recognizing his philanthropy and contributions to industry.

== Career ==
=== Early career ===
Akobo began his professional career in Nigeria’s oil and gas sector in the late 1990s. He worked with the International Petroleum Company of Nigeria (IPCO) as an Electrical Instrumentation Superintendent before joining Total E&P, where he served as a technical assistant in stock control under the company’s procurement operations. In the mid-2000s, Akobo joined General Electric Nigeria, initially working in vibration and flow measurement technologies before moving to a senior sales role. During his tenure, he was credited with driving significant commercial growth, including a reported quadrupling of the company’s sales.

=== Entrepreneurship and business ventures ===
In 2009, Akobo founded Plant Engineering Limited, later rebranded as PE Energy Ltd, to provide engineering, procurement, and technical services for Nigeria’s oil and gas industry. The company was established to bridge the gap between the technical requirements of international oil companies and the local service capacity. Over time, PE Energy developed expertise in automation, Flow measurement, Valve systems, and Systems integration.

By 2015, PE Energy was engaged in professional engineering circles, presenting on High-integrity pressure protection system (HIPPS) at a seminar hosted by the Nigerian Society of Engineers in Port Harcourt. In 2016, Akobo launched PANA Holdings as a multi-sector conglomerate, consolidating his various business interests. The group’s portfolio includes Synergy E&P, an exploration and production company. AKD Digital Solutions, a subsidiary specialising in automation, telecoms, and digital innovation. PANA Infrastructure, a subsidiary focused on power and renewable energy. PANA Academy, a skills-development platform. Afriksnus and KariCare, an e-commerce subsidiary.

In August 2021, the company commissioned a Centre of Excellence in Port Harcourt, designed to serve as a hub for automation, process and systems integration, valve assembly and actuation, metering systems, and compressor solutions. In 2022, PE Energy inaugurated Nigeria’s first HIPPS recertification facility, providing in-country capacity for testing and certification of critical oilfield safety systems.

PE Energy signed a strategic partnership with Endress+Hauser and Thomassen Energy on measurement and turbine asset-management projects. A partnership with Siemens with a focus on automation and electrification and Cross River State with a focus on solid mineral development and industrialisation. By 2025, PE Energy had expanded its scope to include decarbonization and flaring-reduction initiatives, unveiling new multiphase pumping systems and process technologies aimed at reducing gas flaring and boosting oil production.

== Leadership roles and policy engagement ==
Beyond his entrepreneurial ventures, Akobo has taken on leadership and advisory roles in Nigeria’s energy sector and on international platforms. He has served as a member of the board of the Petroleum Technology Association of Nigeria (PETAN) and sits on several advisory boards within the industry. The Nigerian Upstream Petroleum Regulatory Commission (NUPRC) appointed PE Energy Ltd to conduct a comprehensive audit of upstream measurement systems. He has also been listed as a mediator with the Alternative Dispute Resolution Centre (ADRC) of NUPRC, which provides industry conflict-resolution mechanisms. Akobo is a frequent participant in regional and international energy forums. He has spoken at the West African International Petroleum Exhibition and Conference (WAIPEC) on unlocking Africa’s oil and gas potential, and at the Nigeria International Energy Summit, where he joined policy discussions on energy transition and industrial growth. In 2024, Akobo led a delegation from PANA Holdings to IIT Madras in India for strategic discussions on Africa’s energy future and opportunities for technological collaboration.

== Philanthropy and social impact ==
Akobo has combined his business career with philanthropy and social investments, particularly in education, youth development, and community welfare. Through his companies, Akobo has supported skills development and human-capital programmes, including the training of young Nigerian engineers and technicians at PE Energy Ltd’s Centre of Excellence. The facility has hosted capacity-building workshops and graduation programmes aimed at improving local technical expertise and advancing in-country value in the oil and gas sector. He is also linked with community projects in Port Harcourt, including contributions to healthcare and religious institutions, as well as support for orphanages and charity drives. In 2024, Obafemi Awolowo University conferred on Akobo an honorary doctorate in Business Management, recognising his philanthropic contributions and efforts to expand access to education and training opportunities. He is an advocate for youth empowerment.

== Public speaking and media engagement ==
Akobo has been an active public speaker at regional and international conferences, often addressing themes of energy transition, industrial growth, and youth empowerment. He has delivered keynote addresses at the West African International Petroleum Exhibition and Conference (WAIPEC), where discussions focused on unlocking Africa’s oil and gas potential, and at the Nigeria International Energy Summit, where he joined policy and industry leaders in debates on energy diversification and local-content development.

In 2025, at the SAIPEC, Akobo emphasised the importance of youth-centred innovation and technology in Africa’s energy transition. Beyond conferences, Akobo has been profiled in business media. An exclusive interview with the Nigerian Content Development and Monitoring Board (NCDMB) highlighted his vision for PE Energy Ltd’s Centre of Excellence and the need for stronger local capacity in engineering and procurement.

Media outlets have also covered his business announcements. In 2025, The Whistler reported on his remarks at the launch of a PANA Infrastructure strategy aimed at reducing Nigeria’s electricity tariffs by 25 percent. Coverage in The Guardian Nigeria has likewise profiled Akobo as part of broader reports on business integrity and ethical leadership.

== Recognition and awards ==
Akobo has received multiple awards for leadership, entrepreneurship, and contributions to Nigeria’s energy sector. Early in his career, he was recognised by the Shell Petroleum Development Company with the Super Vendor Delivery Performance Award and the Integrity Award, as well as by Honeywell EMEA with a sales excellence award. His companies have also been recognised for governance and industry leadership. In 2023, the NNPC honoured him with the NOG Excellence Award.

In 2024, African Leadership Magazine named Akobo the African Energy Person of the Year, citing his contributions to energy transition and regional industrial development. That same year, he received the Visionary CEO of the Year Award from Energy Times Nigeria. In 2025, Akobo was listed among the Global Power Leaders at a ceremony held at the UK House of Lords, an event covered by multiple Nigerian media outlets. That year, he also received the Global Business Conclave Leadership Award from White Page International.

In 2024, the South Carolina House of Representatives passed a resolution recognising Akobo for his work in the energy sector in Nigeria.

== Personal life ==
Akobo was born in Port Harcourt, Rivers State, Nigeria, and is married with 4 children.
