= Olawale Adeniji Ige =

Nigerian electrical engineer (1938–2022)

Minister of the Federal Ministry of Aviation
- In office 1993–1994

Minister of the Federal Ministry of Communications
- In office 1990–1992

Personal details
- Born: 13 October 1938 Lagos, Nigeria
- Died: 9 May 2022 (aged 83)
- Party: Non-Partisan

Olawale Adeniji Ige MFR (13 October 1938 – 9 May 2022) was a Nigerian electrical engineer and former Minister of the Federal Ministry of Communications (1990–1992). He also served as the Minister of the Federal Ministry of Aviation (1993).

== Life and career ==
He was born on 13 October 1938 in Ogbomosho, a city in Oyo State, Nigeria. He was educated at Baptist Boys High School, Abeokuta, the capital of Ogun State, Nigeria (1951–1956) where he obtained the West African School Certificate (WASC). He proceeded to the Polytechnic, Regent Street, London now University of Westminster where he obtained a Diploma in electrical engineering. He later became a graduate of the Institute of Electrical and Electronics Engineers in 1965.

He returned to Nigeria as a chartered engineer in 1967 to join the services of the Federal Ministry of Communications where he rose to the position of a Director General in 1989. He was appointed the honorable Minister of the Federal Ministry of Communications in 1990, a tenure that ended in 1992 and later reappointed the Minister of the Federal Ministry of Aviation in 1993. He was the first civilian Chairman of Nigerian Telecommunications Limited, NITEL, and was the Chairman of the Board of Trustees of the Nigerian Internet Group and also on the Board of the Nigerian Communications Commission, NCC.

== Awards and fellowship ==
- Member of the Order of the Federal Republic, MFR (1979)
- Fellow of the Nigerian Academy of Engineering

== See also ==
- List of notable engineers in Nigeria
