= Micheal Faborode =

Nigerian academic (born 1956)

9th Vice-chancellor of Obafemi Awolowo University
- In office July 2006 – June 2011
- Preceded by: Rogers Makanjuola
- Succeeded by: Idowu Bamitale Omole

Personal details
- Born: Micheal Oladimeji Faborode; September 1956 (age 69) Ondo State, Nigeria

Micheal Oladimeji Faborode (born September 1956) is a Nigerian educational administrator and a professor of Agricultural Engineering. He was vice chancellor of Obafemi Awolowo University from 2006 to 2011.

== Background and education ==
Faborode was born in Supare, a town in Akoko Ondo state, Nigeria to the family of the late Pa. S.O Faborode. He attended his elementary school at St. John's, Oka-Akoko Ondo state Nigeria and secondary school at Victory College, Ikare Akoko. He obtained his Bachelor of Science (B.sc) and Master of Science (M.sc) degrees at Obafemi Awolowo University, then University of Ife. He was awarded a Doctor of Philosophy (Ph.D.) in Engineering at the University of Newcastle, UK.

== Career ==
Faborode was appointed the 9th, Vice Chancellor of Obafemi Awolowo University in July 2006, after the tenure of professor Rogers Makanjuola (VC, between 1999 and 2006). Before Faborode was appointed as the Vice Chancellor of Obafemi Awolowo University, he has served as head of several professional bodies. He was the former vice president of COREN, an engineering regulation body in Nigeria.

He is a member and fellow of several professional bodies. He is member, Commonwealth Association for Development, Nigerian Materials Society, Nigerian Biomathematics Society and American Society of Agricultural Engineers. He is fellow, Nigerian Society of Engineers, Nigerian Society of Agricultural Engineers (now Nigerian Institution of Agricultural Engineers), Nigerian Academy of Engineering and honorary fellow, Nigerian Institute of Building(NIOB).

== Awards and prizes ==
- He was awarded an honorary fellow of the Nigerian Institute of Building (NIOB)
- Nigerian Society of Engineers (NSE) Merit Award in 1989
- The National University Commission (NUC) 40th Anniversary OAU distinguished Alumni Award
- Association of Professional Bodies of Nigeria Professional Excellence Award

== Selected published works ==
- Aregbesola, O. A., Faborode, M. O., & Ezeokoli, O. I. (2016). Engineering properties of Roselle (Hibiscus sabdariffa) calyxes. Agricultural Engineering International: CIGR Journal, 18(3), 225-232.
- Faborode, M. O. (1986). The compression and relaxation behaviour of fibrous agricultural materials (Doctoral dissertation, University of Newcastle upon Tyne).
- Sanni, L. A., Ugoso, E. S., & Faborode, M. O. (2015). Effect of dryer parameters on the drying characteristics and quality of cassava flour. African Journal of Food Science and Technology, 6(7), 185-193.
- Elime, A., Mpele, M., Ohandja, A., Jeremie, M., Rehman, A., Sarviya, R. M., ... & Mandal, S. Biodegradation of Some Bioplastic Materials under Different Soil Types for Using as a Biodegradable Drip Tubes Abstract PDF.

== See also ==
- Obafemi Awolowo University
- List of vice chancellors in Nigeria
- Nigerian Academy of Engineering
