= Ibijoke Faborode =

Nigerian women's rights activist

- Born: Osun
- Citizenship: Nigerian
- Education: Bachelor's degree in History and International Relations
- Alma mater: Obafemi Awolowo university
- Occupation: Business
- Organization: ElectHer
- Father: Micheal Faborode
- Awards: One Young World 2019 Dutch MFA

Ibijoke Faborode is the co-founder and CEO of Nigerian nonprofit ElectHER.

== Biography ==
Faborode was born in Osun State. Her father is Micheal Faborode, Vice chancellor at Obafemi Awolowo University.

Faborode has a bachelor's degree in History and International Relations from Obafemi Awolowo University, a master's degree in Project Management from École de management de Normandie, and a master's degree in Social Business and Entrepreneurship from The London School of Economics.

Faborode has a graduate degree in business. She worked for the UK Foreign and Commonwealth Office, leading policy, trade and investment relations across West Africa. She also managed communication campaigns for governments and brands and worked as the Regional Business Development Manager Sub-Saharan Africa for The Africa Report.

After the 2019 Nigerian general election resulted in only four percent of female candidate's election, Faborode founded ElectHER to increase the number of women in government. She also spearheaded the first African mobile app for election data analysis.

== Awards ==
- 2019: One Young World 2019 Dutch MFA
- 2019: Public Service Nominee for The Future Awards Africa
- 2022: 100 Women (BBC)
- 2023: Global Citizen's 18 global activists to look out for
