= Olatokunbo Somolu =

Nigerian structural engineer (born 1950)

- Born: 1950 (age 75–76); Lagos, Nigeria
- Education: Anglican Girls' school
- Alma mater: Queen's College Lagos; University of Lagos
- Occupations: Teacher at Yaba College of Technology; Assistant chief Civil Engineer at Nigerian National Petroleum Corporation
- Organizations: Nigerian Academy of Engineering; Nigerian Society of Engineers; Nigerian Institute of Management

Olatokunbo Arinola Somolu (Yoruba pronunciation; born 1950) is a Nigerian structural engineer. She was the first Nigerian woman to gain a PhD in any engineering field.

== Early life and education ==
Olatokunbo Somolu was born in Lagos State on 11 October 1950. She received primary education at the Anglican Girls' School, Lagos, and secondary schooling at Queen's College, Lagos. She studied Civil Engineering at the University of Lagos, graduating top of her class with a B.Sc. degree in 1973. In 1978 she gained her PhD in Civil Engineering (Structures).

== Career ==
Somolu became.a Pupil Engineer with Sokoto Waterworks in 1973. She lectured at Yaba College of Technology from 1977 to 1982. In 1982 she joined the Nigerian National Petroleum Corporation (NNPC) as Assistant Chief Civil Engineer. In 2005 she became the first woman to head the Engineering and Technology Division of NNPC as the Group General Manager. She retired in 2009.

In 2007 Somolu was inducted into the Nigerian Women Hall of Fame. In 2017 she was honoured for her pioneering professional achievement by the Professional Excellence Foundation of Nigeria (PEFON). She is a fellow of several professional bodies like Nigerian Academy of Engineering, Nigerian Society of Engineers and member, Nigerian Institute of Management (NIM).
