= Bruce Krasberg =

Industrialist and horticulturist

- Born: December 30, 1906; Schenectady, New York, US
- Died: June 1, 1988 (age 81); Evanston, Illinois, US
- Education: University of Illinois
- Occupations: Businessman, horticulturist
- Spouse: Corinne Raster
- Children: 2

Bruce Krasberg (1906–1988) was an American industrialist and horticulturist who was president of the R. Krasberg and Sons Manufacturing Company of Chicago, which later became the Krasberg Corporation (Krasco).

The Boy Gardener statue in the Bruce Krasberg Rose Garden at the Chicago Botanic Garden

== Biography ==
Krasberg was born in Schenectady, New York, the youngest of two sons of inventor and industrialist Rudolph Krasberg, a German American immigrant who founded the Krasberg manufacturing business with his sons in 1930. Bruce was educated at the University of Illinois and took over Krasco upon the retirement of his father. The Krasberg Corporation produced a variety of machinery, from phonograph motors to kitchen and gardening equipment. Bruce was president of both the Tool and Die Institute of Chicago and the Pressed Metal Institute of America.

During World War II, Krasco was subcontracted for services and supplies for the Metallurgical Laboratory at the University of Chicago, which was established as part of the Manhattan Project. Documentation remains unclear as to what services and supplies the Krasberg Corporation provided for the laboratory.

Later in his career, Bruce Krasberg became known for his horticultural pursuits. He began planting roses in 1937, was a member of the Chicago Horticultural Society from the early 1950s, and later became president of the Chicago Flower and Garden Show Corporation and national president of the Men's Garden Clubs of America. The showpiece rose garden at the Chicago Botanic Garden, behind which Krasberg was the moving force, was named in his honor upon completion in 1985. The Krasberg Rose Garden features more than 5,000 varieties of roses.

Krasberg was married to Corrine Raster, granddaughter of 19th century Chicago newspaper editor and political figure Hermann Raster.
