= Umar Garba =

Nigerian academic

Umar Garba Danbatta
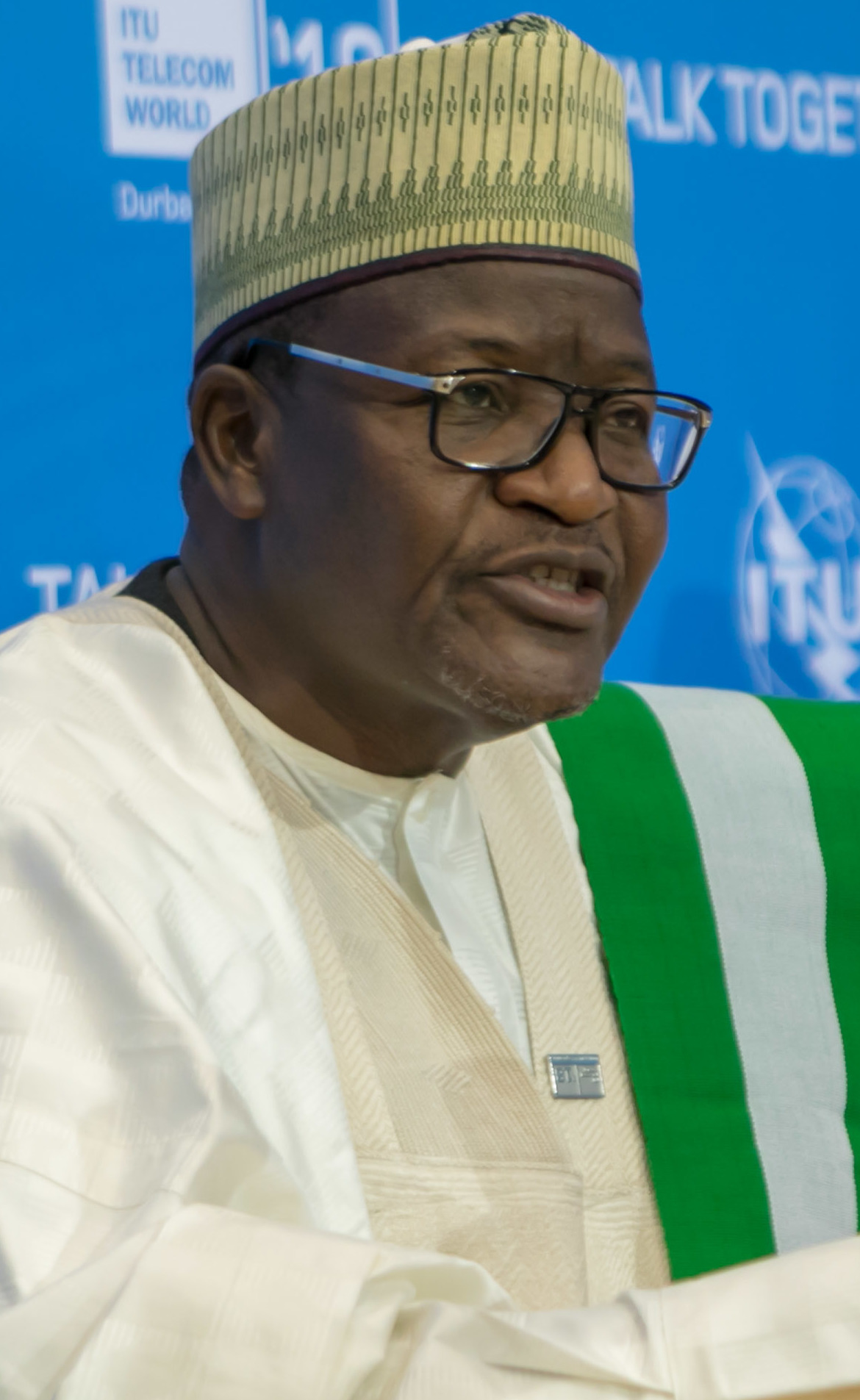

Executive Secretary Nigerian Communications Commission
- In office 2014–2023
- Preceded by: Dr. Eugene Juwah

Personal details
- Born: January 22, 1959 Kano State, Nigeria
- Education: Wrocław University of Technology; University of Manchester
- Profession: Professor

Umar Garba Danbatta, is a Nigerian author, philanthropist, administrator and professor of electrical, telecommunications engineer. He served as the executive vice-chairman and chief executive Officer of Nigerian Communications Commission since November 2015 to April 2020 and was reappointed in July 2020 to October 2023 by the confirmation from the Senate house. Prior to his appointment, he has been acting vice-chancellor of Kano State University of Science and Technology since its establishment in 2001 and became acting vice-chairman of Nigerian Communications Commission in August 2014.

== Background ==
He was born in Danbatta in Kano State. He earned his Bachelor's and master of sciences and engineering from Wrocław University of Technology and holds a PhD of science and technology from the University of Manchester.

== Career ==
He began lecturing at Bayero University Kano in the faculty of technology working for up to 30 years and also lectures in telecommunications engineering in the institution, he later became the head of department at electrical engineering dean of faculty science and technology. He also held various postings in the institution and was member and chaired more 50 universities committee and task forces. He was also a supervisor of many Masters, Bachelor's and philosophy doctor projects in engineering and telecommunications.

He was a member of the Council for the Regulation of Engineering in Nigeria and the Nigerian Society of Engineers, serving as a member. He became vice president of International Centre for Advanced Communication Studies in its establishment by the Nigerian Communications Commission and Digital Bridge Institute.

Since 2013, he has been a member of the Common Wealth Nations.

He has authored several books, and has been credited in more than 50 articles in journals. He also has received many awards and honors.
