= Adeola Olubamiji =

Canadian engineer (born 1985)

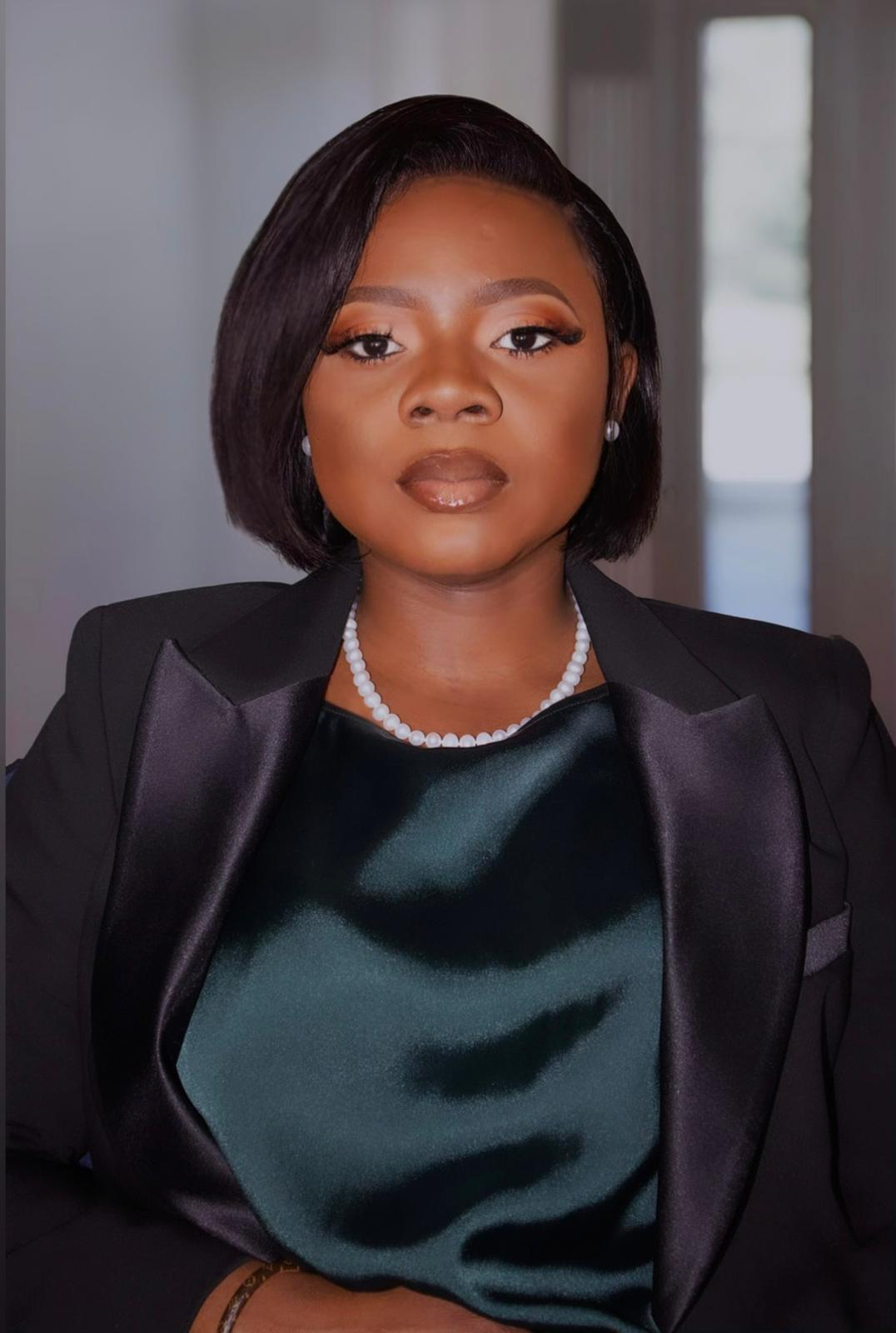
- Born: April 3, 1985 (age 41); Ibadan, Nigeria
- Education: Olabisi Onabanjo University; Tampere University of Technology; University of Saskatchewan
- Employer: Desktop Metal Inc
- Known for: Biomedical Engineering, 3D-Printing, Industry 4.0

Adeola Deborah Olubamiji (born April 3, 1985) is a Canadian technologist who specializes in metal and plastic additive manufacturing (also known as 3D printing). In 2017, she became the first Black person to obtain a PhD in Biomedical Engineering from the 112-year-old University of Saskatchewan, Canada. She went on to give a TEDx Talk on how she utilized 3D printing for recovery of damaged articular cartilage in Canada.

== Background and education ==
Adeola Olubamiji was born on April 3, 1985, in Nigeria, a native of Ijare area, Ondo state. She was raised in Ibadan where she attended Alafia Public Primary School and St Gabriel Secondary School, Mokola. She obtained her bachelor's degree in Physics (with Electronics) from Olabisi Onabanjo University, and later went on to obtain her master's degree at Tampere University of Technology, Finland. She received her Doctorate degree from University of Saskatchewan, becoming the first Black person to obtain a Ph.D. in Biomedical Engineering from the University.

== Career ==
She is currently the Director of Additive Manufacturing Solutions at Desktop Metal. Prior to that, she worked as an Advanced Manufacturing Technical Advisor at Cummins Inc. Indiana, as an additive manufacturing subject matter expert, instrumental in the development of additive manufacturing technology roadmap, also improving Cummins' laser printed 316L stainless steel.

She worked as the Lead Metallurgist and Material Engineer at Burloak Technologies from 2016 to 2018. While at Burloak Technologies, she also acted as the Principal Liaison Officer for all Burloak's and Multiscale Additive Manufacturing Lab at the University of Waterloo, Ontario, Canada.

She is the Founder of STEMHub Foundation, a Canadian non-profit that empowers and teaches science, technology, engineering and mathematics (STEM) education to students and early career professionals. In addition, she sits on the board of Health Science & Innovation Inc. Indianapolis, Indiana as the Secretary of the board. She is the chief consultant at D-Tech Centrix, an education and career consulting company, located in Ontario Canada and Indiana USA

== Awards and recognition ==
In 2017, CBC named her on a list of 150 Black women making Canada better, commemorating the 150th celebration of Canada.

In 2019, she was named one of the 10 L'Oréal Paris Women of Worth Honoree Canada.

In 2019, she was named as one of 27 Influential Women in Manufacturing Honoree in the USA.

In 2020, Olubamiji was awarded as one of 130 STEP Ahead Honoree and female manufacturing leaders by the Manufacturing Institute, USA.

She was selected as an awardee of Top 100 Canada's Most Powerful Women in 2020, under the Life Science and Technology category.
