= Oyinkansola Fawehinmi =

Nigerian lawyer

- Born: 16 February 1993 (age 33); Isolo Lagos
- Other name: Zaeedat Adesola
- Education: Babcock University (Bachelor of Laws); Nigerian Law School (Civil Litigation, Criminal Litigation, Corporate law, Ethics); Quantic School of Business and Technology (Master of Business Administration)
- Known for: Entertainment law
- Father: Major General (Rtd.) Abdul Lateef Fawehinmi
- Awards: Lawyer of the Year, The Future Africa Awards, 2022. Outstanding Young Lawyer of the Year, Esq Awards, 2022. Top 50 Music Executives, Turntable Power List, 2021/22. Advisory Board Member, Audio Girl Africa. Vice President Events, Women in Music Nigeria

Oyinkansola "foza" Fawehinmi is a Nigerian entertainment lawyer also known as Foza which is an acronym of her names Fawehinmi, Oyinkansola, Zaeedat, Adesola. She was born in Lagos to Mr. and Mrs. Fawehinmi on February 16, 1993.

== Career ==
Foza began her career as a road manager at Monarc Entertainment, where she managed the press rounds for Burna Boy's debut album, "L.I.F.E." She also coordinated Chee's tour arrangements. She later moved to Incubation Factory, initially as head of business and album executive producer, eventually becoming the general manager.

She has worked with artists and companies such as Timaya, GoodGirl LA, Boomplay Music, Music Time!, ColdPlay, Warner Music, and Teni the Entertainer.

Foza is a founding partner at Technolawgical Partners, representing clients in the media, cyber, and entertainment industries, including The Sarz Academy, Odunlade Adekola, Timaya, Linda Ikeji Blog, and Incubation Factory Entertainment Limited. She served as Managing Partner from 2014 to 2020.

She also served as the President of Digital Music Commerce and Exchange Limited, a pan-African IP valuation, catalog management, and administration company. Foza co-founded Greenlight Music Publishing, one of Nigeria's first local music publishing companies, addressing music rights ownership in the country. She is the founder of Zaeda Oracle Limited.

== Conference Engagements ==
On August 28, 2020, Foza participated as a Moderator for The MTN Business of the Arts Series. An initiative launched by the MTN Foundation in partnership with the Musical Society of Nigeria, to educate music scholars about the intricacies of the music industry, the art, the culture, the people, and most importantly, the business.

She was part of a panel of discussants for the January 9th Collective (J9C) conference. J9C is a socio-cultural group that holds annual public lectures. Other panelists were the Centre Director of CIAPS, Lagos, Prof. Anthony Kika; and the columnist and publisher of The Cable Newspaper, Mr. Simon Kolawole.

She featured at the AfricaNXT conference alongside some other entertainment industry experts like Seun Fakorede, Commissioner for Youth and Sports, Oyo State. She was also part of the panelists of MTV Base Musicology 2022 titled: The Art of Performance: Balancing Expectations and Obligations.

== Memoir ==
In 2023, Foza published her memoir titled "So Far So Foza," detailing her journey from childhood to her professional achievements. The book, published by Zmirage Publishing, offers insights into her personal life and career.

== Awards and memberships ==
- Lawyer of the Year, The Future Africa Awards, 2022
- Outstanding Young Lawyer of the Year, Esq Awards, 2022
- Top 50 Music Executives, Turntable Power List, 2021/22
- Advisory Board Member, Audio Girl Africa
- Vice President Events, Women in Music Nigeria.
