= Government Comprehensive Secondary School =

Government Comprehensive Secondary School (GCSS) is the premier comprehensive secondary school in Nigeria. It is located in the Borokiri neighbourhood of Port Harcourt, the capital of Rivers State, Nigeria. The school was established through the collaboration of the United States Government of John F. Kennedy represented by the United States Agency for International Development (USAID), the University of California, Los Angeles (UCLA) and the then government of Eastern Region, Nigeria in 1962. Its foundation teaching staff were professors of the University of California, Los Angeles, led by Professor Lynne C. Monroe. Monroe was principal of the school from inception until June 1964 when he returned to UCLA.

The school is currently funded and administered by the Rivers State government through the Rivers State Ministry of Education.

== Notable alumni ==
Government Comprehensive Secondary School has produced notable alumni in different fields, they include:

- Joseph Atubokiki Ajienka, former vice-chancellor of the University of Port Harcourt
- A. Igoni Barrett, writer
- Sam Dede, actor
- Finidi George, former Nigerian footballer
- Okey Wali (SAN), former president of the Nigerian Bar Association (NBA)
- David Ibiyeomie, Nigerian pastor, founder and senior pastor of Salvation Ministries, Port Harcourt, Nigeria

== See also ==
- List of schools in Port Harcourt
- Comprehensive High School, Aiyetoro
