= Edet Amana =

Nigerian engineer

Chief Dr Edet Amana (born December 11, 1938) is a Nigerian engineer.

== Early life and education ==
Edet James Amana, Officer of Order of the Niger (OON) was born December 11, 1938, in Oyubia Oron, Akwa Ibom State was educated at Methodist College, Uzuakoli and King's College, Lagos. He attended Imperial College London (1961-6) where he attained a First class degree in Civil Engineering coming first overall in his graduating class. After which he began working for a British firm of consulting engineers. On his return to Nigeria he was employed as a service engineer for Shell-Mex & BP (1968–72).

== Career ==
In 1972 he set up Amana Consulting Engineers. Over a 15-year period the firm was responsible for the design and implementation of projects valued at about $2bn. The engineering services division held services for AW Chesterton of Boston, and Hewlett-Packard (1982). In 1981 a joint venture was set up with Earth Technology Corporation of California for geotechnical and geophysical surveying and mapping. Another venture involving Israeli interests covered architectural planning. At its peak, the company employed 30 engineers, including 10 expatriates. From 1980, the group began to develop rubber farms and has recently established a rubber processing venture. The group is also involved in insurance brokerage and trading in supply for the oil industry. Investments have been made in banking, publishing and property. Edet Amana was a founding director of Citibank Nigeria and served on the board of that bank from 1985 to 2010.

Today Edet Amana is the chairman of Amana Group of Companies and a past president of the Nigerian Academy of Engineering. He is also a fellow of the Nigerian Society of Engineers, a past president of the Association of Consulting Engineers Nigeria, fellow Nigerian Institute of Management and fellow International Institute of Directors. He is also a member of the American Society of Civil Engineers and the Association of African Development Experts.

== Personal life ==
Edet Amana's first wife, Doris Edet Amana, with whom he shared six children, died on December 11, 2004. He shares two children with his second wife, Hilda Edet Amana.

== Awards ==
- Officer of the Order of the Niger 2005
- Knight of John Wesley awarded by Methodist Church Nigeria 2004
- Doctor of Science DSc (Honoris Causa) by University of Uyo 2010
