= Precision Metalforming Association =

- Abbreviation: PMA
- Formation: 1942; 84 years ago
- Type: Industry trade association; advocacy group
- Purpose: Lobbying, membership improvement, industry surveys and information
- Headquarters: Independence, Ohio
- Chairman: Gene Lambert
- President: David Klotz
- COO/CFO: Mark Getsay
- Website: PMA.org

Precision Metalforming Association or PMA is a trade association representing the $137-billion metalforming industry of North America: the industry that creates precision metal products using stamping, fabricating, spinning, slide forming and roll forming technologies, and other value-added processes. PMA’s origin was the Pressed Metal Association founded in 1913; the group disbanded during the Great Depression. In 1942 the organization re-emerged as the Pressed Metal Institute, founded by 42 members in Cleveland Ohio. In 1961, the association’s name changed to the American Metal Stamping Association. The organization consists of several industry-focused “divisions:” Metal Spinning (chronological first division, 1975); Washer Manufacturing; Slideforming (1985); Small-Lot Stamping and Fabrication; Custom Rolforming(founded as the Custom Roll Forming Institute in 1972); Tool and Die(1999); Next Generation (2006); and the largest division, Metal Stamping. The Stamping division was formed in 1987 when the AMSA changed its name to the Precision Metalforming Association, to better demonstrate industries the PMA serves.

PMA generates industry information in economic and industry survey reports. It provides benefits like Health Insurance for Members and the PMA 401(k) Retirement Plan. Additional, PMA is an advocacy group attempting to influence policy makers in Washington DC through a partnership with the National Tooling and Machining Association on topics like supply chain, safety regulations and taxes.

Chicago-based industrialist and horticulturalist Bruce Krasberg was president of the PMA in the 1950s. In March 2025 the association elected Christopher Zuzick, Vice President of Sales of Waukesha, Wisconsin-based Waukesha Metal, as its 2025 chairman of the board.

PMA has 1,000 member companies primarily located in the United States and Canada.
