= Hauwa Muhammed Sadique =

Nigerian engineer

- Born: February 6, 1969 (age 57)
- Education: Army command children school, Kaduna Queen Amina college University of Maiduguri Bayero university
- Organization: Nigeria society of Engineers Society of Women engineers
- Parents: Muhammed Abubakar (father); Amina Muhammed (mother)

Hauwa Muhammed Sadique (born February 6, 1969) is a Nigerian engineer and the 14th President of the Association of Professional Women Engineers of Nigeria (APWEN). She is the first Northern President of the association.

== Early life ==
Hauwa was born on February 6, 1969, to the family of the late Muhammed Abubakar, and Late trader Amina Muhammed Shuwa. She is a native of Mafa local government area in Borno State, Nigeria.

She had her primary education at Army Command Children School in Kaduna in 1976. She attended Queen Amina College, Kakuri for her secondary education. She gained a national diploma in Agricultural Engineering Technology and later got a B.Eng in 1994 from the University of Maiduguri. She received a M.Sc in Economics from Bayero University in 2005.

== Career ==
Hauwa started as a teacher at Airforce Primary School in Kano. She began working for the Family Economic Advancement Programme (FEAP) in 1999. She was later posted into the engineering department of the Federal Ministry of Agriculture and Water Resources. She later became the chief engineer in dams and reservoir operations department in Kano.

She is the 14th President for The Association of Professional Women Engineers of Nigeria (APWEN) and the first northern President. She was Inaugurated on February 16, 2016. She has served as the financial secretary, general secretary, ex-officio and vice-president for the association.

She is a member of the Nigerian Society of Engineers, the Society of Women Engineers, the National Institute of Cost and Appraise Engineers, and the Council for the Regulation of Engineering in Nigeria.
