= Hauwa Ali =

Nigerian writer

- Occupation: Writer, Novelist
- Language: English
- Citizenship: Nigerian
- Genre: Fiction
- Notable works: Destiny

Hauwa Ali (died 1995) was a Nigerian writer known for her novels exploring the lives of Muslim women and raising questions about Islamic values and women's independence. Her best-known novel, Destiny, won the Delta prize for fiction.

== Life ==
Alia was born in Gusau in northern Nigeria. She taught at the University of Maiduguri and her novels were published in late 1980s. In 1995 she died of breast cancer.

== Writing ==
Ali's fiction is written from the point of view of a young unmarried woman, and presents education as "the gateway to a successful, stimulating future".

The central character of her first novel Destiny (Enugu, 1988) is 16-year-old Farida. The story sets up tensions between, on one hand, education, employment, independence and a husband of Farida's choice and, on the other, a husband who persuades her relatives he offers financial security, but tries to coerce her to be subservient and agree to all his choices. Her second novel, Victory (Enugu, 1989), continues some of these themes and also introduces questions about inter-cultural marriage.

One critic makes connections between Farida's problems and Islam, suggesting she shows "submissive acceptance of fate". Another argues against this and emphasizes her "unwillingness to be discouraged" and her commitment to prayer, seeing her faith as a positive strength. Destiny has been said to belong to a "tradition of Islamic resurgence, while managing to interrogate the consequence of its rigid application". Ali has been described as one of the women writers in 1990s northern Nigeria "giving voice to [their] creative talents " within "walls of religion and culture".

Destiny won the Delta prize for fiction.
