= Samuel Olatunde Fadahunsi =

Nigerian engineer (1920–2014)

President of the Council for the Regulation of Engineering in Nigeria (COREN)
- In office 1977–1986

President of the Nigerian Society of Engineers (NSE)
- In office 1967–1970

Personal details
- Born: 17 March 1920 Osun State, Nigeria
- Died: 12 August 2014 (aged 94) Lagos, Lagos State, Nigeria

Samuel Olatunde Fadahunsi OFR CON (17 March 1920 – 12 August 2014) was a Nigerian civil engineer and former President of COREN, an engineering regulation body in Nigeria.

== Life and career ==
He was born on 17 March 1920 in Osun State, southwestern Nigeria. He was educated at Saint John School, Iloro, Ilesha, Osun State (1927-1936). He also attended Government College, Ibadan (1937-1942). In 1948, he received a scholarship that earned him a bachelor's degree in Civil engineering at the Battersea Polytechnic in London. Having completed his bachelor's degree in 1952, he joined the service of Cubits, British engineering company, where he worked for two years. He returned to Nigeria, where he became a full engineer in 1954. He left to England in 1957 for a post graduate (PGD) training as a water engineer. He completed the program in 1958 and returned to Nigeria as a Senior Engineer in various towns in the old Western Region, including Abeokuta, Ibadan and Benin. He later rose to the position of a Chief Water Engineer in the old Western Region of Nigeria (1960-1963). He later became the Deputy Chief Executive Officer (1963-1965) and Chief Executive Officer, Lagos Executive Development Board (LEDB), now Lagos State Development and Property Corporation (LSDPC) (1965-1972). He served as Chairman of Industrial Research Council of Nigeria between 1971 and 1974.

== Fellowship ==
- Foundation Fellow of The Nigerian Academy of Engineering.

== Awards ==
- Certificate of Honour, Nigerian Boy Scouts Movement
- Officer of the Order of Niger, OFR (1982)
- Commander of the Order of Niger, CON (2002)

== See also ==
- Ilesha
- Olateju Oyeleye
