= International Institute of Directors =

International business organization

The International Institute of Directors (IIOD) is an international organization set up in 1985 to support and set standards for business strategic growth and personal professional development. Organizations such as the Centre for Professional Development exist to assist business owners and company directors.

The IIOD currently runs small support network groups called RHINO Groups, who offer real support for businesses in the countries in which the IIOD (International Institute of Directors) operates.
