= Ifedayo Akintunde =

Nigerian engineer

Robert Ifedayo Akintunde (born 2 November 1935) is a Nigerian engineer, a distinguished Fellow of the Nigerian Society of Engineers (NSE), and former President of the society. He was the first African to win the WFEO Medal of Engineering Excellence after doing so in 2017. Akintunde is also a Fellow of the Nigerian Academy of Engineering, the Institution of Civil Engineers (UK), and a Chartered Engineer of the U.K. since 1965. He was registered by Council for the Regulation of Engineering in Nigeria in 1974.

== Career ==
Akintunde began his career in the United Kingdom with some engineering consulting firms before taking up an appointment with the then-Western State Ministry of Works and Transport. Afterward, he obtained a second Master’s degree in Environmental Engineering before returning to handle some World Bank Assisted Road projects in Western Nigeria.

He founded the firm Profen Consultants Inc. in 1976, of which he is the Chief Executive to date. As a senior engineer in the Highways Division of Western Region Ministry of Works and Transport 1962 – 74, as Chief Engineer with a frontline Roads and Bridges contractor 1974 – 76, and also as Chief Executive of his civil engineering consulting firm 1976 – present, Akintunde has been involved in the designing and construction of many highways, bridges, and water supplies.

He is the former Vice President of the World Federation of Engineering Organizations (WFEO) 1991-2003, an umbrella international engineering organization. He was recently a winner of the Ibadan Anglican Diocese 2007 Merit Award and the Patron of a Zonal Christian Association of Nigeria. In recognition of Akintunde's contributions, the headquarter office and auditorium buildings in the Nigerian Society of Engineers Ibadan would be named after him.

Akintunde formed a one-man delegation accompanied by the WFEO Secretary-General, Mr. John Mckenzie of the U.K. to ascertain and convince the WFEO that Havana, Cuba, was a suitable venue to hold the 1993 WFEO General Assembly and Conference. His favorable report confirmed Havana as the venue for the 1993 conference. At Havana, the discussion that originated at Arusha in 1991 on the determination of acceptable subscription formula for members took a dramatic turn with members rejecting the existing formula. Akintunde indicated the wrong assumptions contained in the existing formula and suggested a completely new approach which he developed in Budapest, Hungary, in 1995, to become known as the “Akintunde formula”.

Akintunde served variously in other dimensions. He was the chairman of the Editorial Committee for WFEO Publications and assisted President Carroll to develop the first WFEO Brochure. With late Mr. Donald Laplante of Canada, he contributed substantially to the development of the Engineers’ Codes of Ethics, and with Mr. David Thom of Australia, the Engineers’ Code of Environmental Ethics.

For his last years as Vice President from 2001 – 2003, he was the chairman of the WFEO Merit Award Committee, a body that seeks and sorts out the best engineers in the world for the honor of the WFEO Prize of Merit Award.

=== Publications ===
Apart from contributions to learned discussions on engineering and technology, he is the author of two books on the subject: Technological Development Through Self-Help, published by Vintage Publishers (Int’l) Ltd., 1994, and Nigerian Construction Industry, Past, Present, Problems, and Prospects, printed by Ibadan University Printery, 2003.

== Awards and honors ==
Akintunde was inducted into Nigeria’s Construction Industry Hall of Fame, in 2017.

In 2018, The Nigerian Society of Engineers (NSE), Oluyole Branch, held the maiden edition of the Ifedayo Akintunde Engineering Lecture at the Felicia Hall, JOGOR Centre, Ibadan.

Akintunde is quoted in at least four World "Who's Whos".
