= Kebbi State University of Science and Technology =

Public university in Kebbi State, Nigeria

- Type: State University
- Established: 2006
- Founders: Kebbi state government
- Chairman: Sen. Maj. Gen. Mohammed Magoro
- Academic staff: 1343
- Location: Kebbi state, Nigeria
- Campus: Rural
- Website: http://www.ksusta.edu.ng

The Kebbi State University of Science and Technology (KSUSTA) is a state government-owned University in Aliero, Kebbi State, Nigeria. KSUSTA offers programmes in agriculture and sciences, among others. It was the 79th university in Nigeria

== Library ==
The library houses materials that support teaching, learning and research in the institution with the availability of e-library resources

Availability of E-resources, status and access

Electronic Resources	Status	Access
Science Direct	Available	Online
Dspace Repository	Available	Online
HINARY	Available	Online
AGORA	Available	Online
GOALI	Available	Online
AORE	Available	Online
ARDI	Available	Online
Emarald	Available	Online
Scopus	Available	Online
E-Thesis/Dissertation	Available	Offline
KOHA	Available	Online/Offline
Electronic Newspapers	Available	Offline
Egranary	Available	Offline
Open Education Resources	Available	Online/Offline
AJOL	Not Available	Online
Ebscohost	Not Available	Online

== History ==
Kebbi State University of Science and Technology was established in 2006.
