= Olatokunbo Olopade =

Olatokunbo Oduyinka Olopade

Chief Judge of Ogun State
- In office 27 September 2011 – August 2018
- Preceded by: Oluremi Jacobs
- Succeeded by: Mosunmola Dipeolu

Personal details
- Born: 1953 (age 72–73)

Olatokunbo Oduyinka Olopade, CON is a Nigerian jurist, who was appointed chief judge of Ogun State. She is the first female justice since the formation of the state.

== Personal life and career ==
Olopade was born in 1953. She had her basic and secondary education at Queens School, Ede and Adeola Odutola College, Ijebu-Ode respectively. She obtained her law degree from University of Ife, and was called to bar in 1976. She has previously worked in the justice department for Edo and Lagos states. Prior to her appointment as chief justice, she was state counsel (1978), director of public prosecution (1993), then chief judge (2011). In August 2018, she retired from her post and was replaced by Honourable Justice Mosunmola Dipeolu in acting capacity.

She is a recipient of the national honor, Commander of the Order of the Niger.
