= Women in Manufacturing =

Women in Manufacturing (WiM) is a national trade association headquartered in Cleveland, Ohio, that promotes and supports women who are pursuing or have chosen a career in manufacturing. It is the only national trade association dedicated to women in manufacturing careers.

== History ==
WiM was founded in 2011 as “Women in Metalforming” to be a supplementary group by the Precision Metalforming Association (PMA). The following year, PMA recognized the need for an organization that could serve as a national resource for women in the manufacturing industry and the name was changed to the Women in Manufacturing Association (WiM). WiM operated under PMA until 2015 when it became a separate, independent 501(c)(6) trade association in 2015. In November 2016, WiM launched its Education Foundation (WiMEF), which is officially designated as a 501(c)(3).

== Organization ==
=== Membership ===
WiM is a membership-based organization with five categories: Student, Professional, Professional Plus, Retired and Corporate. Members are able to participate in virtual and in-person networking opportunities, professional development webinars, online discussion communities, and educational opportunities both regionally and nationally.

=== Leadership ===
The current Chairwoman of WiM Board of Directors is Virginia Harn, Principal for CliftonLarsonAllen (CLA). Allison Grealis is the Founder and President of WiM.

=== Chapters ===
The Women in Manufacturing Association has almost 30 local chapters throughout the United States which operate under the jurisdiction of the WiM national organization. These state-wide and regionally-based chapters provide members local access to networking, training, education and inspiration. Each Chapter offers activities and programming specific to the unique needs of the local area served. .

=== Funding ===
WiM receives funding from membership and programs fees, foundations, and corporations.

== Partnerships ==
In 2016, WiM and Case Western Reserve University's (CWRU) Weatherhead School of Management, with the support of the GE Foundation, collaborated to launch the Leadership Lab for Women in Manufacturing, which provides executive education and training to individuals in mid-to-high level management roles in manufacturing. The Leadership Lab for Women in Manufacturing builds on the CWRU's Leadership Lab for Women in STEM, created in 2014 to provide professional development for women in male-dominated industries.

Also in 2016, WiM partnered with Arconic Foundation to create the Virtual Learning Series, a program consisting of six bimonthly webinars covering a variety of industry-related topics.

== Events & programs ==
WiM's largest annual event, the WiM SUMMIT, launched in 2010. The annual SUMMIT brings hundreds of members together to a location that changes each year, affording attendees the opportunity to experience manufacturing and develop their networks throughout the United States. The 2022 SUMMIT will be held in Atlanta, GA, on October 11–12.

WiMWorks, WiM's proprietary career center resource, is a platform for connecting job seekers with employers. The system's features include a board for job postings, an anonymous résumé bank, and an internal messaging system for users.
