= Umar Buba Bindir =

Nigerian agricultural engineer

Secretary to the State Government (SSG) Adamawa State, Nigeria
- In office 2015 – till date

Director-General and Chief Executive Officer of the National Office for Technology Acquisition and Promotion (NOTAP), Abuja. Nigeria
- In office 2009–2015

Director, Technology Acquisition and Assessment, Federal Ministry of Science and Technology, Abuja. Nigeria
- In office 2006–2009

Director of Sports, Federal Ministry of Sports and Social Development, Abuja. Nigeria
- In office 2005–2006

Director of Monitoring and Management Information Services, National Poverty Eradication Programme, The Presidency, Abuja. Nigeria
- In office 2000–2005

Director of Operations, Family Economic Advancement Programme (FEAP), The Presidency, Abuja. Nigeria
- In office 1998–2000

Personal details
- Born: 11 August 1961 (age 65) Adamawa State, Nigeria

Umar Buba Bindir (born 11 August 1961) is a Nigerian agricultural engineer and currently, Secretary to the State Government (SSG) Adamawa State of Nigeria.

== Life and career ==
He was born on August 11, 1961, in Yola, the capital of Adamawa State, northeastern Nigeria. He obtained a Bachelor of science (B.sc) degree with first class honours in Agricultural Technology from the University of Maiduguri and took the compulsory one year National Youth Service Corps in Benue State, the north central region of Nigeria. He later obtained a Master of science (M.sc) degree in agricultural machinery engineering and a doctorate degree, Ph.D. in agricultural machinery design from Cranfield University. Having completed his doctorate degree, he joined the academic staff of Papua New Guinea University of Technology where he later became head of Agricultural Engineering Department, a position he held from 1992 to 1998. He specialized in Machine Design and Development Engineering. He had served in several institute and government parastatals, including the Appropriate Technology and Community Development Institute in Northern Australia, Family Economic Advancement Programme, FEAP and Director of Sports, Federal Ministry of Sports and Social Development, Nigeria. Specifically, he served as Director of Operations – Family Economic Advancement Programme (FEAP), The Presidency Nigeria from 1998 to 2000; Director of Monitoring and Management Information Services at the National Poverty Eradication Programme (NAPEP) The Presidency Nigeria from 2000 to 2005; Director of Sports – Federal Ministry Sports and Youth Development Nigeria from 2005 to 2006; Director Technology Acquisition and Assessment – Federal Ministry of Science and Technology Nigeria from 2006 to 2009; Director General/CEO National Office for Technology Acquisition and Promotion (NOTAP) Nigeria from 2009 to 2015 and currently the Secretary to the State Government (SSG) Adamawa State of Nigeria from 2015 to date. He is a registered Engineer with the Council for the Regulation of Engineering in Nigeria (COREN), a European Engineering Council Chartered Engineer, holds wide range of professional Fellowships and currently serves as a Council member of the Nigerian Academy of Engineering. He is also passionately involved in driving the establishment of Nigeria's Science and Technology Parks programme and pioneered the establishment of Africa's Premier Science and Technology Innovation Corridor (APSTICA) in Abuja. He also pioneered the Technology Story Board project (TSB) and NOTAP-Industry Technology Transfer Fellowship (NITTF) as guided capacity building strategies to evolve highly skilled Science Technology and Innovation (STI) manpower for Nigeria at the primary and tertiary levels.

== Selected works ==
He Designed and produced a once-over groundnut combine harvester suitable for Nigerian farmers and animal gears system for processing agricultural commodities in rural area, designed, developed and commercialized a coconut de-husking machine for small coconut producers in Australia/Pacific and Asia, designed and developed solar water desalinating plant for rural areas of the pacific, designed and developed vegetable storage system for rural areas, designed a 16-bird slaughtering kit for small scale poultry processors.

== See also ==
- University of Maiduguri
