= Stephen A. Akinlabi =

Nigerian mechanical engineer and academic

- Education: Federal University of Technology, Akure; University of Port Harcourt; University of Johannesburg
- Engineering career
- Discipline: Mechanical Engineering
- Institutions: University of Johannesburg; Northumbria University; Colorado State University
- Employer: Colorado State University
- Significant advance: Advanced manufacturing, friction stir welding, and additive manufacturing
- Awards: Fellow of the Higher Education Academy (FHEA); 2024 Student Teaching Award (Northumbria University)

Stephen A. Akinlabi is a Nigerian mechanical engineer and academic. He is an Associate Teaching Professor in the Department of Mechanical Engineering at Colorado State University and a faculty member of the Adams State University–Colorado State University Mechanical Engineering Partnership Program. His research addresses advanced manufacturing and materials processing, including additive manufacturing and welding technologies, with applications in industrial engineering and sustainability.

== Education ==
Akinlabi obtained a Bachelor of Engineering degree in Mechanical Engineering from the Federal University of Technology, Akure. He earned a Master of Engineering degree from the University of Port Harcourt and completed a Doctor of Engineering degree at the University of Johannesburg in 2017.

== Career ==
Prior to his appointment at Colorado State University, Akinlabi held academic and research appointments at institutions including the University of Johannesburg. His work encompasses teaching, supervision, and collaborative research in mechanical and manufacturing engineering.

== Research ==
His research lies in mechanical and manufacturing engineering, focusing on friction stir welding and spot welding, additive manufacturing, and materials characterisation. His work examines the mechanical performance, microstructural evolution, and optimisation of metallic and composite materials processed using advanced solid-state joining and manufacturing techniques.

He has contributed to peer-reviewed studies on friction stir-based processes, including analyses of microstructure–property relationships, joint integrity, and the thermomechanical behaviour of aluminium and copper alloys. His co-authored review article in Welding in the World provides an overview of friction stir-based techniques and their applications in manufacturing. Additional experimental studies published in Advances in Materials and Processing Technologies and Materials Today: Proceedings address welding parameters, microstructural characterisation, and material behaviour during friction stir processing. His peer-reviewed articles in Thermal Science examine heat transfer and energy-related aspects of mechanical systems. His work on laser technologies has also been noted in SPIE Professional, which discussed sustainable laser applications and laser research activities in Africa.

== Awards and honors ==
- Fellow of the Higher Education Academy (FHEA), United Kingdom, recognizing professional commitment to learning and teaching in higher education.
- 2024 Student Teaching Award, Northumbria University, awarded for excellence in engineering education.

== Selected publications ==
- Adedeji, P. A., Akinlabi, S., Madushele, N., & Olatunji, O. (2020). Hybrid neuro-fuzzy wind power forecasting and wind turbine location for embedded generation. International Journal of Energy Research, 45(1), 413–428. doi:10.1002/er.5620
- Omoniyi, P., Acharya, U., Akinlabi, S., & Akinlabi, E. (2025). Taguchi–Grey relational analysis-based multi-objective optimisation of weld bead geometry and hardness in laser-welded Ti-6Al-4V alloy. International Journal on Interactive Design and Manufacturing
- El-Zathry, N. E., Mahamood, R. M., Akinlabi, S., & Woo, W. L. (2024). Taguchi-based optimisation of friction stir welding parameters for Al-Li 2060 alloy. Heliyon, 10(24)
- Abima, C. S., Akinlabi, S., & Akinlabi, E. T. (2022). Comparative analysis of TIG, MIG and TIG–MIG hybrid welding of AISI 1008 steel joints. Scientific African, 17
- Ikumapayi, O. M., Kazeem, R. A., Popoola, L. T., Laseinde, O. T., Afolalu, S. A., Nwala, N. C., Akinlabi, S. A. & Akinlabi, E. T. (2024). Development and assessment of African star seed (Chrysophyllum albidum) oil-based cutting fluid in turning AA6061 using Taguchi grey relational approach. International Journal on Interactive Design and Manufacturing, 18, 6397–6412
- El-Zathry, N. E., El-Attar, T., Sabry, I., Mahamood, R. M., Akinlabi, S., Woo, W. L., Akinlabi, E. & El-Assal, A. (2025). Fused deposition modeling component quality enhancement by experimental investigation and ANN prediction. International Journal on Interactive Design and Manufacturing
