= Federal Ministry of Information and National Orientation =

Government ministry in Nigeria

The Federal Ministry of Information and National Orientation is a ministry in the Government of Nigeria. It is responsible for the dissemination of essential and vital information that will enhance and facilitate democratic governance of Nigeria as a Federal Republic, as well as promoting the culture and tourism potentials of the country.

The ministry was created in 1999 by the administration of Olusegun Obasanjo. It was later dissolved on January 11, 2007, as part of a restructuring process that led to the creation of the Nigerian Federal Ministry of Information and Communications and the Nigerian Federal Ministry of Tourism, Culture, and National Orientation. However, in 2015, the ministry was re-established by the administration of Muhammadu Buhari, who merged the two ministries into one.

The ministry is led by a minister appointed by the President of Nigeria. The current minister is Mohammed Idris Malagi, who assumed office on 21 August 2023.
