= Godman Akinlabi =

Nigerian pastor and author

- Born: Godman Akinlabi; 28 December 1974 (age 51); Oyo State, Nigeria
- Occupation: Pastor
- Years active: 2010–present

Godman Akinlabi (born 28 December 1974) is a Nigerian pastor, author, public speaker and engineer. He is the lead pastor of The Elevation Church.

== Early life and education ==
Born on December 28, 1974, Godman Akinlabi is from Igbo-Ora, Oyo State, located in the South-Western part of Nigeria. He grew up in Ibadan, where he attended Government College, Ibadan, Oyo State, Nigeria from 1985 to 1990. In 1992, he was admitted to the Federal University of Technology Akure, Ondo State to study Mining and Mineral Engineering, for which he received a Bachelor of Technology (B.Tech.) in 1997. He obtained his master's degree in international diplomacy at the University of Lagos. He is an alumnus of Manchester Business School, England, from where he earned an MBA.

== Pastoral ministry ==
He started his pastoral ministry at Daystar Christian Centre, where he served in different capacities which included ushering pastor, teacher, preacher and director of pastoral care. He serves on the faculty of Daystar Leadership Academy, where he facilitates Leadership Development courses over a period of twelve years. On 10 October 2010, the senior pastor of Daystar Christian Centre, Sam Adeyemi, commissioned The Elevation Church of which Godman has since been its lead pastor.

In July 2016, he facilitated and launched "BelieversConnect", an application developed with a view to connecting single-status Christians "with similar desires for a successful marriage." Based on the appeal of his sermons to a demographic population largely dominated by youths, he was featured as one of the five most influential pastors in Nigeria.

== Published works ==
Akinlabi has published several books, which include the following:

- The 7 Commandments of Foolishness, April 2014, WestBow Press. ISBN 978-1-4908-1503-9
- Sexuality: Get a Grip (Singles)
- Sexuality Get a Grip (Couples)
- Don't Waste Your Pain
- Moving from Fear to Faith
- I am Possible
- Burning Questions, Flaming Answers
