= Seun Fakorede =

Nigerian politician

Commissioner for Youth and Sports, Oyo State
- In office August 26, 2019 – 14 September 2023
- Preceded by: Abayomi Oke
- Succeeded by: Wasilat Adegoke Adefemi

Personal details
- Born: Oluwaseun Temidayo Fakorede; May 22, 1992 (age 33)
- Citizenship: Nigerian
- Education: Obafemi Awolowo University
- Alma mater: Government College Ibadan 2003-2006, Oladipo Alayande School of Science Oke-Bola, Ibadan 2006-2009.
- Occupation: Politician, Engineer

Seun Fakorede (born May 22, 1992) is a Nigerian entrepreneur, speaker and politician. At 27, he became the youngest commissioner in Nigeria's history when he was appointed Commissioner for Youth and Sports in Oyo State in August 2019 to July 2021. Seun was reappointed on October 11, 2021. He is the founder and director of non-profit Home Advantage Africa where he advocates for African patriotism among youths.

== Education ==
Fakorede attended Government College Apata, Ibadan. In 2016, he graduated with a degree in Civil Engineering from Obafemi Awolowo University, Ile Ife. He is an indigene of Idere area of Ibarapa Central Local Government Area, Oyo State.

== Awards ==
He won The Future Awards Africa Prize for Governance in 2020.

Fakorede was named a 2022 Politician of Year by One Young World, receiving his award in Manchester, England in September 2022 alongside four other young politicians from around the world.

== See also ==
- Not Too Young To Run
- Ishaku Elisha Abbo
- Oluwaseyi Makinde
