= Council for the Regulation of Engineering in Nigeria =

Nigeria supreme council for engineers

- Formation: Decree 55 of 1970
- Type: Professional organization
- Purpose: To regulate and continue the training and practice of Engineering in Nigeria and to ensure and enforce the regulation of all Engineering personnel
- Headquarters: 22, Addis Ababa Crescent, Wuse Zone 4, FCT Abuja
- Location: Nigeria
- Members: Over 80,000
- Official language: English
- President: Professor Engr. Sadiq Zubair Abubakar FNSE, FNAE
- Registrar: Professor Engr. Bello Adisa. FNAE
- Website: http://coren.gov.ng/

Council for the Regulation of Engineering in Nigeria (COREN) formerly known as Council for the Registration of Engineers in Nigeria, is the regulatory body that governs the practice of engineering in Nigeria. The current serving President is Prof Sadiq Zubair Abubakar FNSE ,FAE

== Council Structure ==
The Council is the highest policy making body. The members of the council must be registered engineering professionals. The council consists of 26 members in accordance with the Act, as follows:

- President – elected by the Council
- Six Representatives of the Nigerian Society of Engineers
- Four Representatives of the Universities with Engineering Faculties
- One Representative of the Polytechnics
- One Representative of the Technical Colleges
- Six Representatives from States of the Federation
- Four Representatives of the Minister
- One Representative of NATE
- One Representative of NISET
- One Representative of NAEC
