= Nigerian Society of Engineers =

Umbrella organisation for engineers in Nigeria

- Abbreviation: NSE
- Founded at: Nigerian House in London
- Headquarters: National Engineering Centre, Labour House Road, Central Business District, FCT, Abuja
- Fields: Engineering
- Website: www.nse.org.ng

The Nigerian Society of Engineers (NSE) is an umbrella organization for engineers in Nigeria. It was founded on 16 February 1958 in the United Kingdom and inaugurated at the Nigerian House in London.

NSE is registered with the Corporate Affairs Commission as a company limited by guarantee.

== Governance ==
The society has a president, deputy president, 3 vice presidents and 6 other executive committee members. The current president is Engr. Ali Alimasuya Rabiu, FNSE, who was elected and sworn in as its 35th president.

Engr. Rabiu had served as the vice president of NSE for three consecutive terms prior to his role as the president. He was elected in 2026, assuming office on the first day of the same year. He was also the former president of COREN, serving between 2019 and 2023.

== Structure and leadership ==
The president of the society is the chief executive, and directs the programme and mandate of the Society on behalf of the members. The president is the chairman at every general meeting, meeting of the council and executive committee of the society. The president holds for a period of two years and is succeeded by the deputy president. The deputy president is elected every two years, who automatically becomes the president after the expiration of the two-year tenure of the predecessor.

The council is the governing body of the society. The council meets bi-monthly to consider memo from the executive committee and others to make policies touching on the conduct and business of the society. The council is made up of statutory members and reports to the annual general meeting, which is an expanded gathering of members once every year.

The executive committee (EXCO) of the society is responsible for overseeing the management and administration of the affairs of the society and reports to council of the society. EXCO is made up of the president, deputy president, vice presidents, members who were elected by other members at the annual general meetings every year and nominated representatives of the divisions.

The secretariat of the society is staffed by professionals with different skills and discipline. The secretariat implements policies of the society and the overall co-ordination of its activities. The executive secretary is the head of the secretariat and oversees the day-to-day management of the secretariat. The National Engineering Centre NEC Abuja houses the secretariat.

The society has established numerous branches in both Nigeria and the UK.

== Membership ==
There are six grades of membership in NSE. They include:

- Student member
- Graduate member
- Corporate member
- Associate
- Fellow..
- Honorary fellow

Membership Levels of the Nigerian Society of Engineers (NSE)

Student Member Description: This membership is designed for students currently pursuing an engineering degree in accredited institutions. Criteria: Applicants must provide proof of enrollment in an accredited engineering program.

Graduate Member Description: Graduate membership is for individuals who have successfully completed a degree in engineering. Criteria: Applicants must present their degree certificate from an accredited institution and must have completed their National Youth Service Corps (NYSC) or received an exemption.

Corporate Member Description: Corporate membership is granted to professional engineers who meet specific criteria and have made notable contributions to the engineering field. Criteria: The applicant must hold an engineering degree from an accredited institution. Completion of mandatory training programs and workshops. Registration with the Council for the Regulation of Engineering in Nigeria (COREN). Submission of a portfolio demonstrating significant professional experience and outstanding contributions to engineering and technology.

Associate Member Description: This membership category is for individuals who are not engineers but have made contributions to the engineering profession or practice. Criteria: Applicants must have a strong affiliation with engineering or related fields, demonstrating contributions or involvement in engineering activities.

Fellow Description: Fellow membership is the highest level of recognition in the NSE, reserved for corporate members who have demonstrated exceptional leadership, innovation, and contributions to the engineering profession. Criteria: The applicant must have been a Corporate Member for at least five years. Demonstrated significant and outstanding contributions to engineering and technology. Recommendations from other Fellows of the NSE. Approval by the NSE Council after a rigorous review process.

Honorary Fellow Description: This membership is reserved for individuals of exceptional stature who are not engineers but have made outstanding contributions to engineering or society at large. Criteria: Selection is based on nominations and approval by the NSE Council, recognizing exceptional achievements or contributions to the field. Key Note: Corporate membership, as well as the Fellow and Honorary Fellow levels, require engineers to showcase outstanding contributions to engineering and technology. This demonstrates that these levels of membership demand a higher level of professional excellence and recognition, aligning with the requirements for proving extraordinary ability or achievements in the field.

== Publication ==
NSE official journal publication is The Nigerian engineer. It also publishes conference proceedings, technical paper and inaugural lectures.

== Past Presidents ==
List of Past Presidents of NSE

Name	Tenure
Engr. Chief G. O. Aiwerioba, FNSE	1958
Engr. Adeniyi Williams, FNSE	1959-1962
Engr. S.O. Williams, FNSE	1963-1964
Engr. J.C. Egbuna, FNSE	1965-1967
Engr. Chief S. O. Fadahunsi, FNSE	1968-1969
Engr. Obi Obembe, FNSE	1970-1971
Engr. Dr. S. O. Meshida, FNSE	1972-1973
Engr. C. S. O. Akande, FNSE	1974-1975
Engr. 'Teju Oyeleye, FNSE	1976-1977
Engr. I. Igiehon, FNSE	1978-1979
Engr. O. Olugbekan, FNSE	1980-1981
Engr. Rev. P.B. Oyebolu, FNSE	1982-1983
Engr. M. N. A. Manafa, FNSE	1984
Engr. A. O. Faluyi, FNSE	1985-1986
Engr. Ife Akintunde, FNSE	1987-1988
Engineer Ibrahim Khaleel Inuwa, FNSE	1989-1990
Engr. Dr. F. A. Shonubi, FNSE	1991-1992
Engr. V. I. Maduka, FNSE	1993-1994
Engr. Dr. O. Ajayi, FNSE	1995
Engr. Dr. E. J. S. Uujamhan, FNSE	1996-1997
Engr. C. A. Mbanefo, FNSE	1998-1999
Engr. H.A. Gumel, FNSE	2000-2001
Engr. F.A. Somolu, FNSE	2002-2003
Engr. M. Bulama, FNSE	2004-2005
Engr. E. M. Ezeh, FNSE	2006-2007
Engr. K. A. Ali, FNSE	2008-2009
Engr. O. A. Ajibola, FNSE	2010-2011
Engr. Mustafa B. Shehu, FNSE	2012-2013
Engr. Ademola I. Olorunfemi, FNSE	2014-2015
Engr. Otis Anyaeji, FNSE, FAEng	2016-2017
Engr. Adekunle Mokuolu, FNSE	2018-2019
Engr. Babagana Mohammed, FNSE	2020-2021
Engr. Tasiu Sa'ad Gidar-Wudil, FNSE	2022-2023
Engr. Margaret Oguntala, FNSE	2024-2025
Engr. Ali Alimasuya Rabiu, FNSE	2026

== National Engineering Center (NEC) ==
The National Engineering Center (NEC) Abuja was commissioned on Thursday 26 July 2007. The commissioning ceremony was performed by the former president of the Federal Republic of Nigeria, Engr. Chief Olusegun Obasanjo, FNSE, GCFR. The Nigerian Society of Engineers (NSE) applied for the allocation of a plot of land in Central Area of Abuja in August 1980 to build the National Engineering Centre (NEC) Abuja during the tenure of past President of NSE Engr. O. Olugbekan, FNSE. The foundation laying ceremony was performed by General I. B. Babaginda GCFR, the then President of Nigeria in December 1992.

== Divisions ==
The following Divisions exist in NSE:

- Aeronautical
- Agricultural
- Appraisers and Cost Engineers
- APWEN
- Automotive
- Chemical
- Civil
- Electrical
- Environment
- Facility
- Geotechnical
- Highway
- Industrial
- Institute of Communication Engineers
- Marine Engr & Naval Architecture
- Mechanical
- Metallurgical, Mining and Materials
- Petroleum
- Polymer
- Power
- Procurement
- Safety
- Space
- Structural
- Water
