= Odunbaku =

Odunbaku is a surname. Notable people with the surname include:

- Oguntola Odunbaku Sapara (1861–1935), Nigerian physician
- Omoayena Odunbaku (fl. 2012), Nigerian development expert
