= YNaija =

Nigerian online magazine

- Website type: News, entertainment, and political weblog
- Available in: English
- Founded: Jan 2010
- Headquarters: Lagos, {{{location_country}}}
- Founders: Chude Jideonwo; Adebola Williams
- Key people: Abiola Olaore (Chief Executive Officer) Isime Esene (Co-Owner) Seun Oluyemi (Shareholder)
- Employees: 10+
- Parent: Generation Y!
- Website: www.ynaija.com
- Launched: January 1, 2010
- Current status: Active

YNaija is a Nigerian online content publishing platform, founded by Chude Jideonwo and Adebola Williams of RED Africa media group. YNaija launched in May 2010 with columnists and various news sources. It offers news, original content and covers politics, business, entertainment, environment, technology, popular media, lifestyle, culture, comedy and healthy living.

In July 2012, YNaija was ranked #5 top blog in the country, by CPAfrica.

== Y! ==
The Y! brand also includes a television show, a radio show and a print magazine. The magazine, Y!, is a 100–150-page monthly publication that initially began as a quarterly.

It has organised events including the #Hashtag Party in July 2011, the YNaija Black Ball, and others.

== Contributors ==
In addition to the Y! Frontpage columns by Ebuka Obi-Uchendu, Tolu Ogunlesi, Kathleen Ndongmo, Japheth J. Omojuwa, Ayo Sogunro and Akintunde Oyebode, there are several other contributors to the Y! Politico, SuperBlogger and 30 Days, 30 Voices series and more on the newspaper, including Abang Mercy, Subomi Plumptre and Ifeanyi Dike Jr.

== Awards ==
In 2012, YNaija co-founders Chude Jideonwo and Adebola Williams were included by BusinessDay, in a 40 under 40 list.

In February 2013, Jideonwo and Williams were named in Forbes' 30 Under 30: Africa's Best Young Entrepreneurs.

Nigerian technology and lifestyle blog, CPAfrica named YNaija the #5 Nigerian blog of the year, in 2012.
