= Akinfolarin =

- Gender: Male
- Language: Yoruba

Origin
- Origin: Nigerian
- Meaning: Valor/bravery walks with wealth
- Region of origin: South West, Nigeria

Akínfọlárìn is a Nigerian surname. It is a male given name and of Yoruba origin, which means "Valor walks with wealth". The diminutive forms include Akin, Fọlá and Fọlárìn.

== Notable individuals with the name ==
- Abisoye Ajayi-Akinfolarin (born 1985), Nigerian entrepreneur and activist.
- Mayowa Akinfolarin (born 1962), Nigerian politician.
