= Emilia Asim-Ita =

Nigerian entrepreneur (1988–2021)

Emilia was the Founder/Practice Director of AML

Personal details
- Born: 29 January 1988
- Died: January 29, 2021
- Citizenship: Nigerian
- Education: BSc and MSc in Mass Communication
- Alma mater: University of Lagos, Cambridge University
- Occupation: Communicator and Journalist

Emilia Asim-Ita (1988 – 29 January 2021) was a Nigerian entrepreneur and co-founder of The Future Awards Africa.

For the past 16 years, she worked in all facets of the Integrated Marketing Communication gamut, Youth Development, and Development Communications.

A graduate (MSc. & BSc.) of Mass Communication from the University of Lagos, Emilia completed various training programmes, taught and consulted on Development Communications, Sustainability, Corporate Social Responsibility, Environmental & Social Risk Management, Corporate Reporting, Advocacy & Policy Influencing, Corporate Governance, Grant Writing, and Executive Coaching amongst many others.

Emilia was the Founder/Practice Director of AML, a multi-disciplinary, strategic communications firm which evolved from a PR/Media Business started in December 2010.

Prior to AML, she co-founded ThistlePraxis; one of the foremost indigenous management consulting companies focused on Sustainability and CSR; and The Future Awards/The Future Nigeria Project and was PR/Marketing Director for the convening organisation, RedSTRAT Communications (now RED Media) for six years.

She has also been Strategy & Communications Director, 3AL, Associate Producer and Content Director, The Academy and Amstel Malta Box Office Reality shows. She started her career as Presenter, Book Review Segment, Mind Your Grammar on NTA 2 Channel 5 before working as Presenter, Youth Talk with Emilia on NTA Network Service for five years.

In her spare time, she served as a mentor for Queens Young Leaders (YLP) Programme by Cambridge University, United Kingdom and both Tony Elumelu Entrepreneurship Programme (TEEP) and I.N.V.E.N.T. in Nigeria. Emilia was an Associate Fellow, Nigeria Leadership Initiative (NLI), a Global Shaper of World Economic Forum and Member, Global Shapers Advisory Council on Impact after serving as Curator of the Lagos Hub.

Emilia's learning and research interests were in project management, digital & social innovation, specialised communication, media ecology, and cybernetics.

On May 2, 2020 in an interview with Kingsley Olumona, she spoke about her work and journalism; business and brand; Nigerian tourism, the proposed social media and hate speech bills by the Senate, and her advice for young people. And went further to talk about how she had always built or grown Brands since she was 16 years old.

== Education ==
Emilia held her bachelors and masters degrees in Mass Communication from the University of Lagos. She started her career as a presenter on the Nigerian Television Authority book review segment, ‘Mind Your Grammar’ and later as an anchor on ‘Youth Talk with Emilia’ on Nigerian Television Authority Network. In 2005, she co-founded The Future Awards with Chude Jideonwo and Debola Williams. Prior to The Future Awards Africa, she was the associate producer for Amstel Malta Box Office reality shows. She moved on to start AML Media, a content advisory firm.

== Personal life and death ==
Friday, 29 January 2021, Emilia Asim-Ita died after a successful appendicitis surgery. Her brother Williams Asim-Ita said, "my sister died having an appendix rupture. The appendix has a small lump underneath it and that small lump burst; that the spleen went to her intestines and polluted parts of her intestine. That she had to go through a surgery to cut the affected part of the intestines. It was successful as it was done by a specialist. Williams noted that his sister was already active and was meant to be discharged but she slumped and died when she was about taking her routine stroll."

A’LimeMedia mourns Emilia Asim-Ita - The entire staff and Board of Strategic Communications Advisory Firm, A’Lime Media Limited, have joined family and friends to mourn the death of the company's founder and practice director, Emilia Asim Ita.
