= Future Awards Africa =

Annual awards in Nigeria

- Current: 2022 Future Awards Africa
- Logo
- Awarded for: Outstanding achievements
- Country: Nigeria
- Presented by: The Future Project
- First award: 6 February 2006; 20 years ago
- Website: awards.thefutureafrica.com

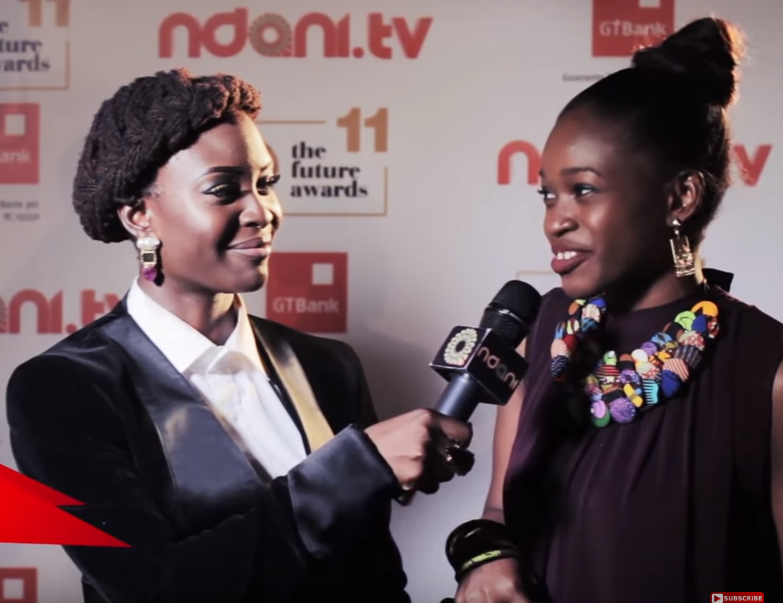
Folu Storms interviewing a guest at the event in 2016

The Future Awards Africa (commonly known as the Future Awards) are a set of awards given annually by The Future Project, a social enterprise communications firm affiliated to Red Africa. The awards celebrates young people between the ages of 18 and 31, who have made outstanding achievement in the year.

The idea for the awards was conceived by Chude Jideonwo, Adebola Williams, and Emilia Asim-Ita in 2005.

== History ==
The Future Awards Africa's first event was on 6 February 2006, at Magnolia Hall, City Mall, Lagos. The venue for the 2011 event was the Landmark Events Centre, Victoria Island, Lagos. Since 2012, it has been held at the Altec Azcum in Port Harcourt, Rivers State. The 2013 edition was hosted by on-air personality Toke Makinwa and rapper Vector.

== Categories, nomination, judging and awards ==
The awards are given to winners in diverse categories, including the Young Person of the Year category.

There is a four-stage, three-month-long judging process involving a board of judges and an audit committee. Judges come from all over Africa. The judges include Mfonobong Nsehe, Belinda Otas (assistant editor, New African Woman), Brenda Wendo (deputy features editor, The Star newspaper, Kenya), Billie Adwoa McTernan (Ghana correspondent, The Africa Report), Adam Bouhadma (editor, 9rayti.com, Morocco), and Michelle Atagana (managing editor, Memeburn).

The audit committee includes Katja Schiller Nwator (Leadership Development and CSR Manager, The Tony Elumelu Foundation), Mahamadou Sy (founder and executive director of the Institut Supérieur de Développement Local (ISDL), Senegal), Wendy Luhabe (author), Abiola Alabi (MD, MNet Africa), Tonye Cole (executive director, Sahara Group), Ndidi Nwuneli (founder, LEAP Africa), Mo Abudu (CEO, EbonyLife TV), Gbenga Sesan (founder, Paradigm Initiative Nigeria), Eikem Nutifafa (founding partner, Oxford and Beaumont, Ghana), Chi-Chi Okonjo (publisher, Ventures Africa), Victoria Trabosh (founder, Ithafari Foundation), Taa Wongbe (managing partner The Khana Group), Ayo Ajayi (MD, PATH Global) and Jennah Scott (director, Liberia Philanthropy Secretariat, Office of the President).

The awards are presented at a live televised ceremony that is also streamed on the internet, most commonly in February or March following the relevant calendar year, and six weeks after the announcement of the final shortlist of nominees.

== Young Person of the Year Award ==
Winners of the Young Person of the Year award include Tanzanian entrepreneur Ashish Thakkar, malaria scientist Ify Aniebo, writer Chimamanda Adichie, NASA scholar Tosin Otitoju, and agriculture entrepreneur and advocate Nnaemekan Ikegwuonu.

== Criticism ==
The awards have drawn criticism regarding the ages of the nominees. In December 2011, Chude Jideonwo said: "We certainly have had more than a few complaints about the ages of one or two nominees... Over the years we have had to withdraw the nominations of a few nominees who have been unable to prove their actual ages..."

The awards have a two-week complaint period, within which the public can email complaints about any nominee to the Central Working Committee about the age or the substance of the achievement of the nominees.

In 2009, an email exchange between a dancer and a former winner of the award, Qudus Onikeku and Chude, leaked on the Sahara Reporters website, as the former sought to clarify comments he had made about the Young Person of the Year Award given to D'banj, in the year after his win, against the backdrop of the musician's controversial video for "Suddenly".

In 2026, Nigerian writer Somto Ihezue stated in a Bluesky post that he had declined a nomination in the literature category because it sought to honour writers who use AI in their storytelling.

== Awards ==
The Future Awards Africa won the Event of the Year award at the first The Nigerian Event Awards (TNEA), in May 2011.
