= Mercy Abang =

Nigerian journalist

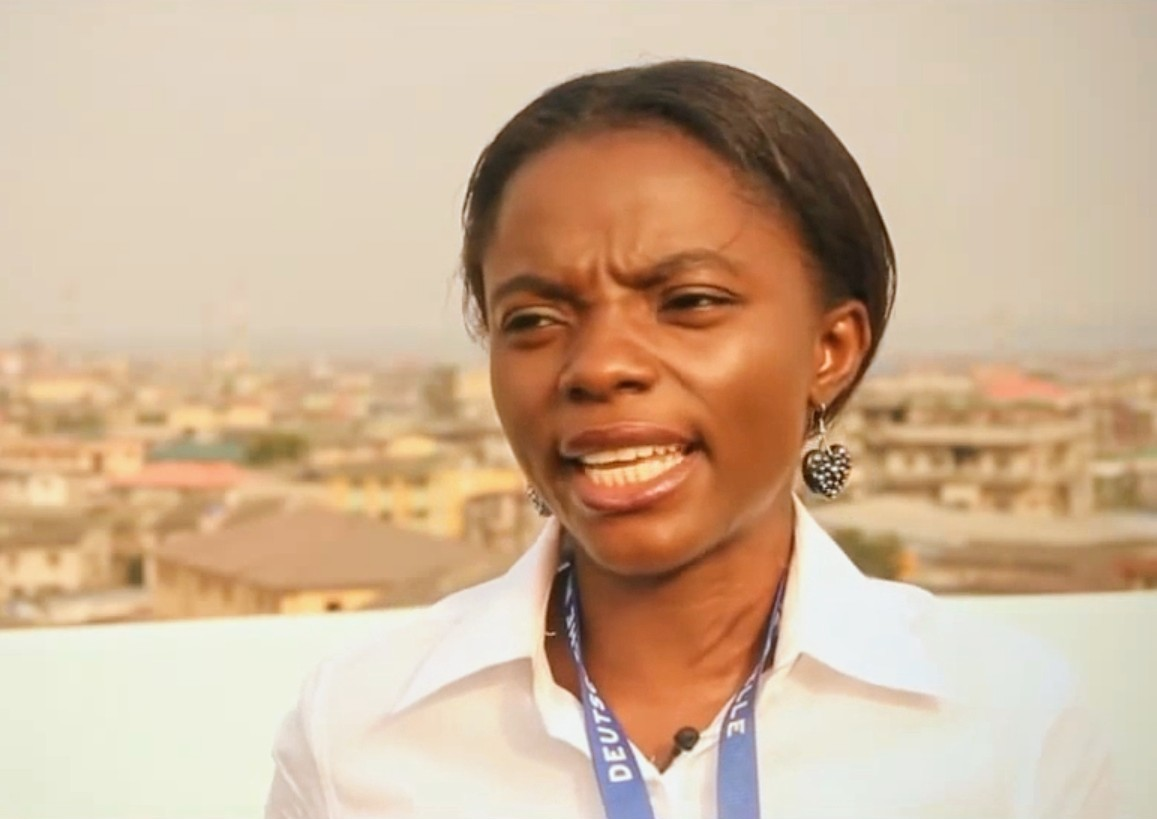
- Mercy Banku Abang
- Born: Mercy Banku Abang; 20 September 1984 (age 42)
- Other name: Banku
- Education: Holy Child Primary and Secondary School; Gwarinpa Secondary School; Grimme-Institute; Kofi Annan International Peace Keeping Training Center
- Occupations: Journalist; educator

Mercy Banku Abang is a Nigerian journalist. She is known for her self-funded journalism focused on vulnerable populations. She is described as one of Nigeria's most syndicated freelance journalists and Nigeria's most syndicated storyteller. Mercy is the 2017 United Nations (Dag Hammarksjold) Journalism Fellow. She has gone on several election observation missions in West Africa. She has interviewed notable Nigerians in her program "Conversations with Abang Mercy", which has had guests such as Reno Omokri, Dele Momodu and Chude Jideonwo. In 2017, she was named Woman of the Year in Journalism. In 2012, she was named as one of 10 Young Nigerian Women to Watch.

She played an important role in reporting the Ghanaian elections, covering various polling stations all over the country and reporting about the role of Ghanaian bloggers during the recently concluded elections. She has also reported extensively about the activities of Fulani herdsmen in Northern Nigeria, visiting communities in Niger state - bringing attention of the Nigerian people to the under -reported stories in Gbagyi communities.

== Background ==
Mercy was born in Ogoja, a neighbouring town to Boki. Her childhood was divided between there and Abuja where her parents eventually moved to. She studied at Holy Child (Convent) Primary School and later at Holy Child Secondary School (Mount Carmel), both in Igoli- Ogoja.

After that, she moved to Abuja with her parents to continue at Gwarinpa Secondary School, Federal Capital Territory, Abuja, and later proceeded to the International Institute of Journalism to study journalism, concluding with a Post-Graduate in Advertising and Public Relations.

Recently, she studied Digital Story Telling at the Grimme-Institut in Bonn, Germany and had in the past studied Media in Peace Keeping Operations and Elections Observation at the Kofi Annan International Peace Keeping Training Center in Accra, Ghana.

== Early life ==
Mercy was born on 20 September 1984. She studied Elections Observation at the Kofi Annan International Peacekeeping Centre Accra

== Career ==
Mercy Banku Abang started her work on television – as a political correspondent with Independent Television and Radio, Abuja – at a very young age. She was saddled with the responsibility of covering the political parties and the electoral commission. She became knowledgeable in Nigeria's politics and election matters. At ITV Abuja, she worked as a non-linear editor, presentation director and producer. One of the programs produced was This Morning on ITV, a breakfast show. She has reported on issues of vulnerable populations and hardships.

In the past, she has worked with her fellow African youths and civil societies organizations in lobbying and advocacy, organizations like Oxfam GB Nigeria, West African Civil Society Forum, Heinrich Boell Foundation amongst others. She has also been a stringer for the Associated Press and a fixer for the Sunday Times of London, the BBC World Service Trust amongst others. Mercy is versatile and doubles as an International Media Fixer with many Organizations like the Associated Press, Al Jazeera, BBC, Sunday Times of London as well as the Columbia Journalism School New York.

In the course of her work with Heinrich Boll Foundation, she has done articles and presentations on Nigeria's environmental situation and postulations for the future in several Nigerian cities including Lagos, Abuja and even internationally, in Berlin and London. Mercy has skills in Television, Print and digital media.

At age 20, she represented Nigeria alongside other influential Africans lobbying against the Economic Partnership Agreements (EPA) with the European Union and the African and Caribbean Countries (ACP) in Senegal and the Gambia.

Mercy worked as a media assistant to then Cross River State Governor Donald Duke, during his presidential campaigns on the platform of the Donald Duke Campaign Organization.

In 2014, she was invited to the African Union's Third Annual High Level Dialogue on Democracy, Human Rights and Governance in Africa; Trends, Challenges and Prospects that held at Nairobi's Safari Park - a meet with participants from over 40 African countries. In March 2015, Mercy alongside international journalist, Kadaria Ahmed of the BBC, hosted Nigerians to a 2-hour live television town hall meeting with the Chairman of the Independent National Electoral Commission, Attahiru Jega in Abuja.

Also, in the run up to the 2015 elections in September 2014, Mercy anchored a Lagos meeting with young people where she interviewed Nigeria's Former Vice President and a presidential aspirant in the election, Atiku Abubakar. She contributes to other media like YNaija and EcoJournalism.

== Advocacy ==
Mercy is a member of the advocacy coalition, Enough is Enough Nigeria founded by Chude Jideonwo, serving at one time in the capacity of Communications Coordinator. Under EiE, she organised and facilitated town hall and campus hall meetings for young Nigerians in the six (6) geo-political zones of Nigeria, educating them about the electoral process and getting them informed about the country's electoral laws. As a public speaker and commentator, she has motivated youths in and outside Nigeria.

As a young African entrepreneur, she works with young people and continues to inspire her generation by creating jobs opportunities and works as a social media specialist and adviser.

She also assisted in the LightupNigeria advocacy project founded by Amara Nwankpa and pushed for the release of funds pledged by President Goodluck Jonathan towards rehabilitation of victims of the 2013 lead-poisoning in gold mines in Zamfara.

== Personalities interviewed ==
In 2017, the firebrand Journalists, Mercy, interviewed Governor Olusegun Mimiko of Ondo state. The emphasis was on traditional birth attendants (TBAs)/Agbebi and optimizing their services with the Abiye programme spread across the 18 Local Government Areas (LGAs). It was also on the establishment of two dedicated Mother and Child Hospitals to reduce Maternal Mortality Ratio (MMR) by 84.9 per cent. That is from 745 per 1000,000 live births in 2009 to 112 per 100,000 live births in 2016.

Mercy interviewed Professor Attahiru Jega, Nigeria's Former Independent National Electoral Commission (INEC) Chairman. She had a two-hour live interview with the academia - that aired on Channels Television - prior to the strongly contested 2015 general elections. The interview was about the conduct of the polls, preparations of the commission, and overall conduct of the process.

That was the election that saw the ouster of former President Goodluck Jonathan and led to the assumption of office of President Muhammadu Buhari, a former military dictator. Mercy also had a two-hour interview with Atiku Abubakar, Nigeria's Former Vice-president and Presidential Aspirant with the ruling All Progressives Congress (APC). It was on the run-up to the elections and the campaigns within the APC that eventually saw to the emergence of President Muhammadu Buhari as the party flag-bearer.

== Media Report ==
- 22,000 Nigerians missing since Boko Haram crisis began: Red Cross
- UN calls for urgent action to end violence in Nigeria
- Reporter killed as toll in Nigeria rallies over Shia leader rises
- Nigeria: Deaths as security forces clash with Shia protesters
- West Africa bloc adopts 'ECO' as name of planned shared currency
- Nigerian Shia leader, wife depart for medical treatment in India
- Nigeria's Muhammadu Buhari sworn in for second term as president
- Trend of doctors emigrating is at an all-time high
- Nigeria's local elections marked by low voter turnout
- Nigeria to hold local elections amid fears of violence
- Nigerian women brace for election upsets
- Civic Journalism And The Role of Young Ghanaian Bloggers
- Poverty within opulence: Water crisis at the heart of Nigeria's capital

== Awards and Recognitions ==
- Woman of the Year in Journalism
- One of the Young Nigerian Women to Watch
- 2017 United Nations Journalism Fellow
- 2017 budgIT Media Fellow
- One of the100 most inspiring Nigerian women
