= Folasade Ogunsola =

Nigerian academic (born 1958)

Professor Folasade Ogunsola OON, Ph.D., FNAMed, FAMedS, FAS
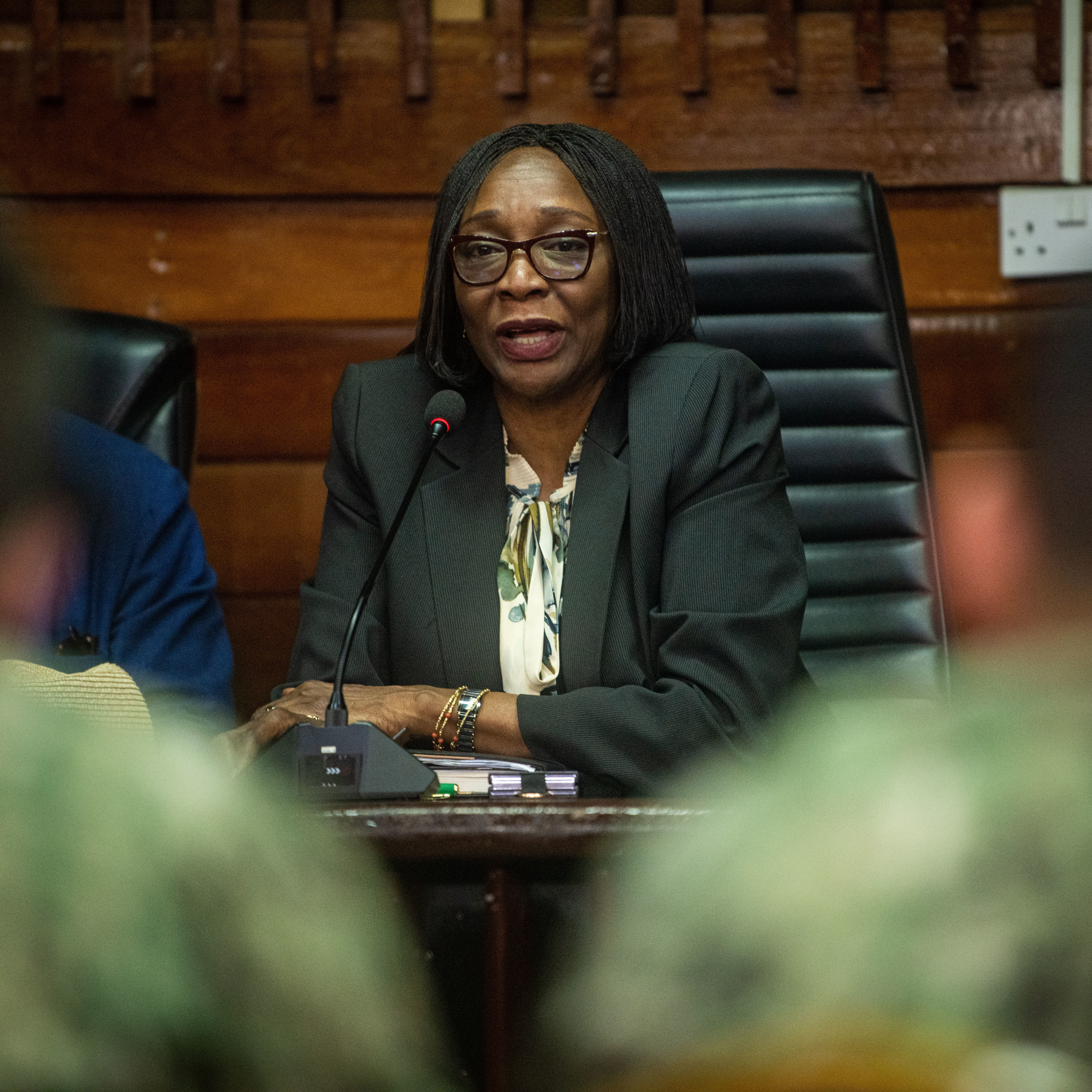
- At a meeting with the U.S. Navy Europe-Africa band during a visit to UNILAG

13th Vice Chancellor of the University of Lagos
- Incumbent
- Assumed office 12 November 2022
- Preceded by: Oluwatoyin Ogundipe

Deputy Vice Chancellor (Development Services), University of Lagos
- In office 2017–2021

Personal details
- Born: Folasade Tolulope Mabogunje; November 14, 1958 (age 68) London, United Kingdom.
- Spouse(s): Mr. Olusegun Ogunsola, FCA.
- Education: College of Medicine, Unilag (Masters in Medical microbiology); College of Medicine, University of Wales, Cardiff (Doctor of Philosophy in Medical microbiology)

Folasade Tolulope Ogunsola OON (born 1958) is a Nigerian professor of medical microbiology, and the Vice-Chancellor of the University of Lagos. She specializes in disease control, particularly HIV/AIDS. Ogunsola was provost of College of Medicine, University of Lagos and the first woman to occupy the position. She was also the Deputy Vice Chancellor (Development Services) of the institution between 2017 and 2021. She was acting vice chancellor of the University of Lagos for a short period in 2020 when the university was plunged into crisis as a result of the removal of the Vice Chancellor by the University Council.

== Early life and education ==
Ogunsola was raised in the University of Ibadan where her father, Akin Mabogunje lectured. As a child, she mimicked medical practitioners by using dolls as patients, while offering medical care to them. She attended Queen's College, Lagos. Between 1974 and 1982, she obtained her first degree from University of Ife. and a master's degree from College of Medicine, University of Lagos, then proceeded for her doctorate at University of Wales between 1992 and 1997.

== Career ==
Ogunsola was Acting Vice Chancellor of the University of Lagos for a short period in 2020 when the university was plunged into crisis as a result of the removal of the Vice Chancellor by the University Council. She was also the Deputy Vice-Chancellor (Development Services) of the university, a position she previously occupied before ascending to the institution's Acting Vice Chancellorship. Before being the deputy vice-chancellor, she was the provost of the College of Medicine, University of Lagos, and Head of Department of Medical Microbiology, College of Medicine, University of Lagos. Her research areas have been centred on the regulation and management of viral diseases, particularly HIV. She is the principal investigator at the AIDS Prevention Initiative in Nigeria (APIN) at the University of Lagos. She has also been the chairman of the Infection Control Committee of Lagos University Teaching Hospital. Additionally, she is the chairman of the National Association of Colleges of Medicine in Nigeria from 2014 - 2016.

In 2018, she expressed concern about disease prevention and control in Nigeria. She identified poor hygiene and overuse of antibiotics as practices that foster antimicrobial-drug resistance. Providing a solution, she maintained that "sustained Infection Prevention and Control (IPC) infrastructure and programs should be built around a set of core components which includes guidelines, training, surveillance, multimodal strategies for implementing IPC, monitoring and evaluation among others". Speaking during a session with the media, she explained that the solution to reducing the 58% unemployment rate was for Nigerian graduates to begin innovating ideas that will enhance human life. She also noted that knowledge in itself isn't sufficient, but its application in an appropriate manner to better mankind and enhance livelihood of others is what youths should be concerned about.

She was a founding member of the Nigerian Society for Infection control in 1998 and is also a member of the Global Infection Prevention and control Network.

She was elected as the acting vice chancellor of the University of Lagos on 24 August 2020. She became the first woman to be vice-chancellor in the university's history.

In May 2023, Ogunsola was honoured as an Officer of the Order of the Niger by President Muhammadu Buhari.

== Publications ==
- Modification of a PCR Ribotyping Method for Application as a Routine Typing Scheme for Clostridium difficile, 1996
- Infections caused by Acinetobacter species and their susceptibility to 14 antibiotics in Lagos University Teaching Hospital, Lagos, 2002
- Attitudes of Health Care Providers to Persons Living with HIV/AIDS in Lagos State, Nigeria, 2003
- Extended-Spectrum β-Lactamase Enzymes in Clinical Isolates of Enterobacter Species from Lagos, Nigeria, 2003
- Risk factors for ectopic pregnancy in Lagos, Nigeria, 2005
- Challenges for the sexual health and social acceptance of men who have sex with men in Nigeria, 2007
- Associated risk factors and pulsed field gel electrophoresis of nasal isolates of Staphylococcus aureus from medical students in a tertiary hospital in Lagos, Nigeria, 2007
- Effectiveness of cellulose sulfate vaginal gel for the prevention of HIV infection: results of a Phase III trial in Nigeria, 2008
- The effects of antimicrobial therapy on bacterial vaginosis in non‐pregnant women, 2009
- Antimicrobial susceptibility and serovars of Salmonella from chickens and humans in Ibadan, Nigeria, 2010
- Characterization of methicillin-susceptible and -resistant staphylococci in the clinical setting: a multi-centre study in Nigeria, 2012
- A community-engaged infection prevention and control approach to Ebola, 2015
