= Paradigm Initiative =

African digital rights organisation

Paradigm Initiative (PIN) is a Pan-African digital rights and inclusion non-profit organisation founded in 2007. It operates and promotes digital rights in Nigeria, Cameroon, Kenya, Senegal, Zambia, and Zimbabwe. The initiative is focused on life skills, ICT, financial literacy and entrepreneurship training for under-served African youth.

== History ==
- Paradigm Initiative was founded by Gbenga Sesan at a cybercafe in Ajegune, Nigeria, in 2007.
- In 2014, Ajegunle.org a program under PIN started a 3-days Google web training with only 36 regiatered participants.
- In 2017, PIN became the first-ever member organization from Africa to join the Global Network Initiative (GNI)
- PIN released its second short film in 2021. According to Nnenna Paul-Ugochukwu, PIN Chief Operating Officer, the short film is to spotlight serious issues affecting digital rights inclusion ecosystem.
- Ayeta, a digital right toolkit, was launched by PIN in 2020
- In 2022, PIN celebrated their 15th anniversary in Lagos, Nigeria.

== Achievements ==
- During the Cameroon 2025 elections, they condemned the internet access restrictions.
- PIN played a major role in the drafting of Africa's first digital rights law.
- PIN called for government investigation on the reported Arik Air's data leak in 2018.
- In 2017, PIN sued the Federal Ministry of Science and Technology in Nigeria after ignoring their request for Freedom of Information over the alleged infringement of privacy by the two new satellites launched by the National Space Research and Development Agency (NSRDA).
- In partnership with Koneta Hub, PIN advocated for a better data protection law in South Sudan.
- In 2024, PIN raised an alarm on the sales of personal details of Nigerians by an unauthorised website. They went further to sue NIMC, and other related government agencies, for not protecting the data of millions of NIgerians.
- PIN in collaboration with CFF-Ghana, EGIGFA, ISOC Ghana, and DREAM created a forum to highlight the digital rights for Ghana's 2024 election.
- Digital Rights and Inclusion Forum (DRIF), an annual conference by PIN, has been hosted in NIgeria, Kenya, Ghana, Zambia, and Cote D’Ivoire.
