= Oluwatoyin Ogundipe =

Nigerian academic (born 1960)

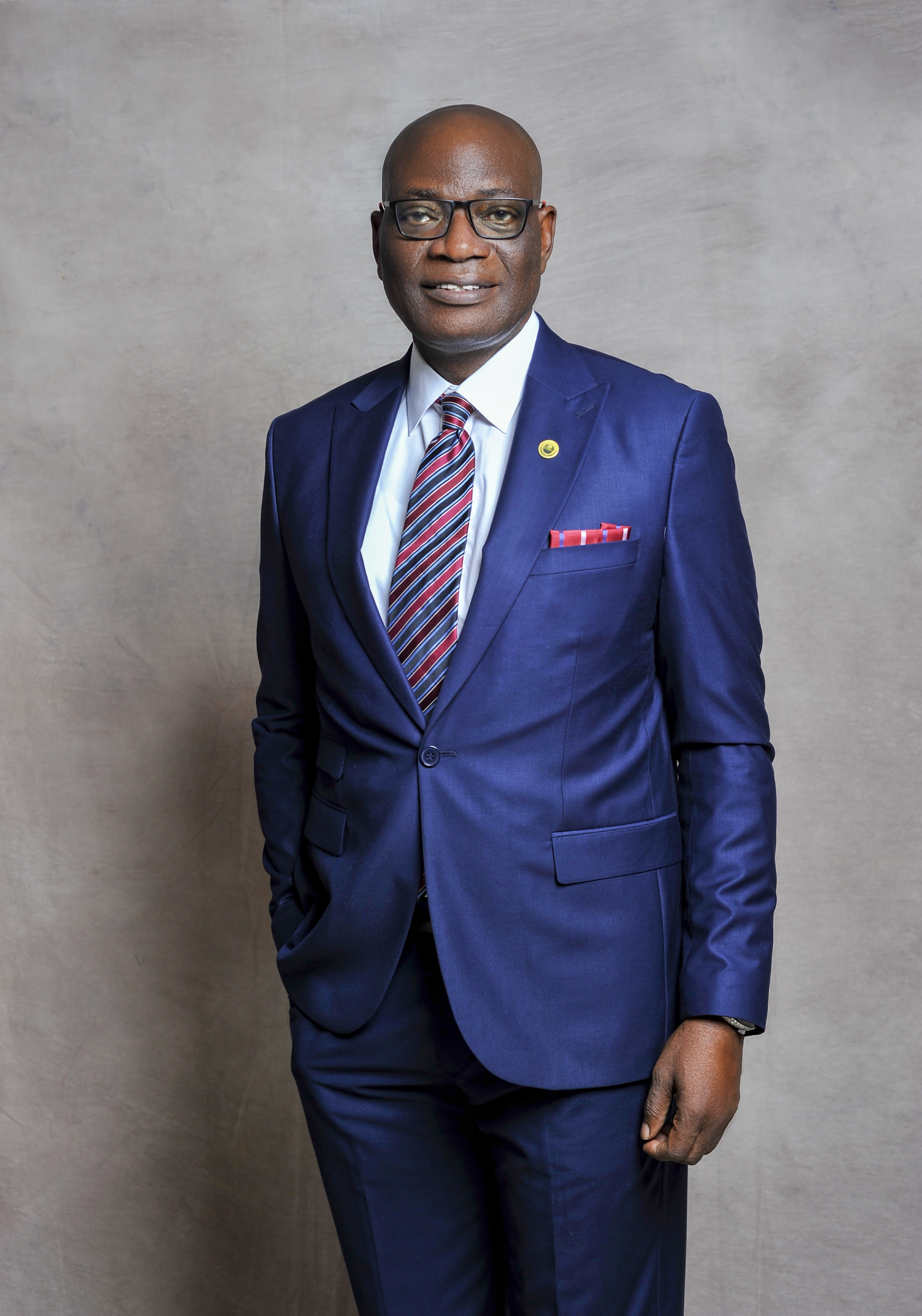

12th Vice Chancellor of the University of Lagos
- In office 12 November 2017 – 12 November 2022
- Deputy: Professor L. O. Chukwu; Professor Ayodele Atsenuwa; Professor Bolanle Olufunmilayo Obo
- Preceded by: Rahmon Ade Bello
- Succeeded by: Folasade Ogunsola

Deputy Vice Chancellor (academic research), University of Lagos
- In office 6 April 2016 – 12 November 2017

Personal details
- Born: Oluwatoyin Temitayo Ogundipe; 31 May 1960 (age 66)
- Spouse: Oluwaseun Ogundipe
- Children: 3
- Education: Obafemi Awolowo University
- Website: https://oluwatoyinogundipe.ng

Oluwatoyin Temitayo Ogundipe (born 31 May 1960) is a Nigerian academic and a professor of botany. He served as the 12th vice chancellor of the University of Lagos from November 2017 to November 2022.

== Early life and education ==
Ogundipe was born on 31 May 1960. He attended the University of Ife (now Obafemi Awolowo University) where he obtained a Bachelor of Science (B.Sc.) degree in botany. He holds a master's degree in botany from the University of Ife and doctorate degree (Ph.D.) from the same university. He then obtained a master's degree in Business Administration from the University of Lagos.

== Career ==
Ogundipe began his academic career at the University of Lagos as a lecturer where he rose to the rank of professor of botany in 2002. He was Dean, School of Postgraduate Studies from August 2007 to July 2011 and Director, Academic Planning Unit from April 2012 to April 2016.

He was appointed as the vice-chancellor of the University of Lagos in November 2017. Until his appointment in November, he was the deputy vice-chancellor of the University of Lagos.

Ogundipe was removed as the Vice-Chancellor of the University of Lagos by the university's governing council following accusations of financial impropriety and gross misconduct. He was however reinstated by President Muhammadu Buhari based on the recommendation of an investigative panel which found that the removal was not done with due process. Ogundipe was appointed the Pro-Chancellor and Chairman of Council of Redeemer's University,Ede in October 2024, a position he held till he was appointed the Chairman of National University Commission (NUC) in June 2026

He is a member and a former president of the Botanical Society of Nigeria, the Nigerian Academy of Science,the Linnaean Society of London, the Royal Society of Biology,London and several other professional bodies.

== Personal life ==
Ogundipe is married with three children.

== See also ==
- University of Lagos
