= Bekeme Masade =

Nigerian social entrepreneur

Bekeme Masade-Olowola
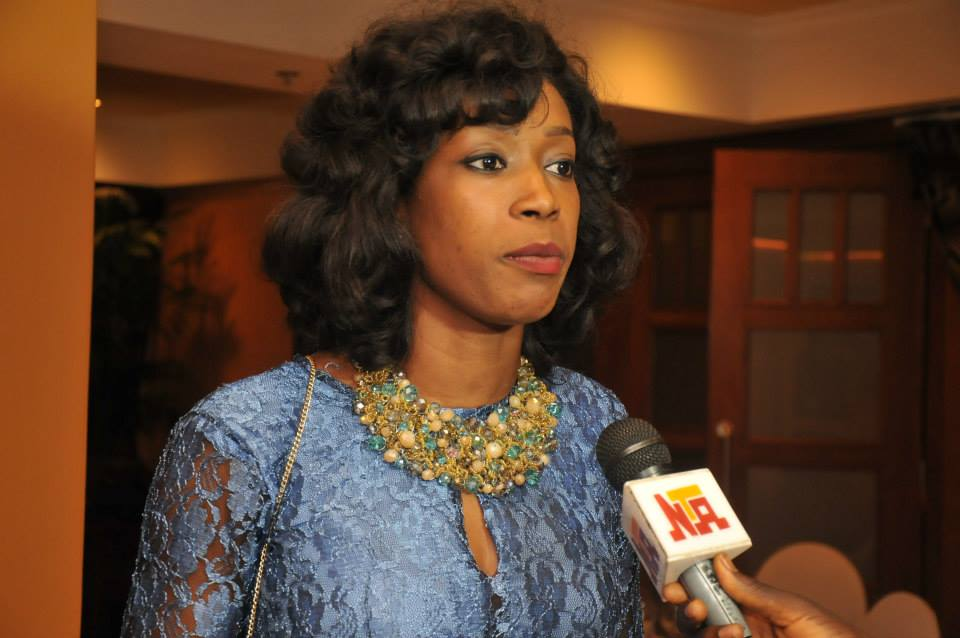
- Bekeme Masade-Olowola at the Business Leaders Roundtable on Sustainable Development in May 2014
- Born: Ilobekeme Chikodili Masade; Lagos, Nigeria
- Education: University of Lagos; Queen Mary University of London
- Occupations: Social entrepreneur, public relations specialist

Bekeme Masade-Olowola is a Nigerian social entrepreneur, a member of the Board of Directors of the Global Reporting Initiative (GRI) – the world's leading sustainability impact measurement and reporting standards body – and the Chief Executive of CSR-in-Action, a group made of a consulting firm, a think tank and a training institute dedicated to corporate social responsibility, policy development, advocacy, empowerment and sustainable development in the region.

== Biography ==
Bekeme Masade-Olowola was born and raised in Lagos. She graduated with a second class upper degree, BA (Hons) English, from the University of Lagos in 2004. In January 2008, she was selected as one of 18 young professional contestants chosen from Africa and the Diaspora to participate in The Apprentice Africa.

As a social entrepreneur, Bekeme Masade-Olowola is the Chief Executive of CSR-in-Action, a social business networking platform and advisory enterprise, dedicated to corporate social responsibility, women and youth empowerment, and sustainable development in Nigeria. Under Masade-Olowola, CSR-in-Action has promoted sustainable measurement and reporting using the GRI framework, specifically, since 2011, and has catalysed the growth of sustainability adoption and transparency in the region through consulting, training and advocacy interventions. CSR-in-Action produced the pioneer sustainability investment report in Nigeria The Collective Social Report: Nigeria (now The Corporate Sustainable Investor Report), endorsed by the United Nations Framework Convention on Climate Change (UNFCCC), and supported by United Nations Global Compact (UNGC), in March 2012; a first of its kind compendium which includes a rating of business sustainability performance. The 2013 report saw the organization's introduction of a sustainability ranking index. In 2014, CSR-in-action was lobbying to unlock over $100 billion in mineral resources potential.

Masade-Olowola helped establish the Business Coalition for Sustainable Development Nigeria (BCSDN) in May 2014, an initiative affiliated with the World Business Council for Sustainable Development (WBCSD), made up of a coalition of leading businesses across all sectors to drive collective development.
