= Awaiting Trial =

Nigerian film

- Directed by: Chude Jideonwo
- Screenplay by: Chude Jideonwo
- Produced by: Chude Jideonwo, Gbolahan Gafar, Otito Wilfred Aso
- Starring: Folarin Falana; Mr. Macaroni; Rinu Oduala; Chude Jideonwo
- Music by: Timi Dakolo, Ego Ogbaro
- Release date: 20 October 2022
- Running time: 73 minutes
- Country: Nigeria
- Languages: Yoruba, Igbo, Hausa

Awaiting Trial is a documentary that follows the lives of three people caught by the injustice of the Nigerian Police, and are held by the unfair structures of both the police and the faulty legal system. This is a story not just about systems but about the people they destroy.

== Synopsis ==
The 2020 #EndSARs protests in Nigeria got the attention and the support of figures from Beyoncé to Joe Biden, putting the spotlight on the significant issue for the country. That social movement grew against the backdrop of #BlackLivesMatter putting violent criminal justice systems, rising incarceration rates and police brutality on the front burner of global conversation. With the awaiting trial system, citizens who are caught for crimes of any magnitude are incarcerated without a charge for months, and years – some up to 20 years for victimless crimes and minor misdemeanours. Many of them die or disappear in prison and police custody. It is a systemic issue which directly affects lives.

The documentary presents the devastating ramifications not just in terms of social justice and fairness, but in terms of decimating families, terrorizing communities and creating a culture of fear. The terror has not ended with two protests. Taking a behind-the-scenes interrogation of this, with never-before-seen revelations from victims, survivors, activists, police and lawyers, this documentary looks at three families whose members have been killed or disappeared by the police, and tells the story of the discrimination and injustice that has destroyed their lives. Directed by Chude Jideonwo (host of the wildly popular #WithChude, a televised series of conversations, some of which have been featured by The New York Times and the BBC), Awaiting Trial was shot in Igbo, Yoruba and English.

== Cast ==
- Folarin Falana
- Mr. Macaroni
- Rinu Oduala
- Chude Jideonwo

== Production ==
Awaiting Trial was produced and directed by Chude Jideonwo with the recently launched Factual & Unscripted Content Studio, with postproduction handled by AMA Psalmist Visuals and music from Timi Dakolo and Ego Ogbaro.

== Awards ==
- African Magic Viewers Choice Awards
- Africa International Film Festival
- Sweden Film Awards
- Florence Film Awards
- Royal Society of Television & Motion Picture Awards
- Nawada International Film Festival 4th Season
