= Olusola Jegede =

Olusola Johnson Jegede
- Citizenship: Nigerian
- Education: Bachelor of Laws (LL.B.) from the University of Bradford; Master of Laws (LL.M) from the University of Lagos
- Occupation: Legal Practitioner
- Organization: Resolution Law Firm
- Notable work: Trademark Registration & Law in Nigeria (Explanations & Materials)

Olusola Johnson Jegede is a Nigerian legal practitioner and author from Lagos, Nigeria. He is known for his work on intellectual property and business law. He is the founding and managing partner at Resolution Law Firm, Lagos. He has been involved in intellectual property law, specifically trademark registration in Nigeria, and national media have covered his professional and academic contributions.

== Early life and education ==
He holds a Bachelor of Laws (LL.B.) from the University of Bradford, Master of Laws (LL.M) from the University of Lagos. He was called to the Nigerian Bar after completing the Nigerian Law School program.

== Career ==
Following his call to bar, and subsequent works as a lawyer, he established the Resolution Law Firm in Lagos, Nigeria, where he has practiced in areas including commercial law, intellectual property, and dispute resolution. He has published articles and given commentary on legal issues in Nigerian media.

In 2022, he authored Trademark Registration and Law in Nigeria (Explanations and Materials), a book aimed at simplifying trademark procedures in the country. The work was reported on by The Guardian Nigeria as a resource contributing to public understanding of intellectual property law, and was also reported by other media outlets In 2023, several Nigerian newspapers reported that he received an honorary doctorate from Prowess University, Delaware, an institution noted by Punch newspaper as not accredited by U.S. Department of Education recognized-agencies. He received the Nigerian Achievement Award for Legal Service, reported by The Guardian Nigeria. He has also overseen initiatives focused on pro bono legal support and community development through Resolution Law Firm. The firm has also engaged on projects such as food and financial aid deliverance to underprivileged groups, including orphanages in Lagos.

== Selected works ==
Trademark Registration and Law in Nigeria (Explanations & Materials), published in 2022.
