= Omalicha =

Nigerian actress and producer

Anita Ifeoma Isede
- Born: Anita Ifeoma Isede
- Education: University of Lagos
- Occupation: Radio personality

Anita Ifeoma Isede, known as Omalicha (also spelt as "Omalisha") is from Agbor in Delta state, Nigeria. She is a presenter on Rhythm 93.7 where she co-hosts the "morning drive", the "late morning show (faji Friday)", "Hola at the seaside (a request show)" and the "seaside".

== Early life and education ==
Omalisha is the oldest of three siblings and the only girl of her family. She is from Agbor, Delta State of Nigeria. Omalisha is a graduate of French from the University of Lagos. She first recorded her voice on Cobhams Asuquo laptop, while in school together, as a bit of an audio voice over which later received the attention of Rhythm FM where she started her career. She plans on having a Vlog and starting a cooking business.

== Career ==
She interviewed Yemi Osinbajo, the Vice President of Nigeria, during their election in 2015.

== Personal life ==
On 21 December 2015 Rhythm FM radio, Omalicha got engaged to her longtime boyfriend Alex Hughes also known as DJ X-EL. In August 2016, the On-Air-Personality took to her Instagram page to announce her pregnancy.
