= Agatha Amata =

Nigerian media entrepreneur and TV host

- Born: 4 November 1969 (age 57); Lagos, Nigeria
- Occupations: Media entrepreneur, Talk show host
- Website: www.agathamata.com

Agatha Amata (born 4 November 1969), is a Nigerian media entrepreneur, talk show host, speaker, TV presenter and philanthropist. She is best known for her talk show Inside Out with Agatha, which is the longest running television talk show in Nigeria which has aired for over twenty years.

== Career ==
Amata is the host of Inside Out With Agatha, an independent television talk show she has hosted for 20 years, which deals with topical issues that affect the society focusing on family using the youth as a tool. Issues are discussed before a live audience. Starting its recording programme from the Law faculty main auditorium of the University of Lagos and moving later on to her new studio in Ilupeju, Lagos.

She is also the managing director of Inside-Out Media Ltd, a media consultancy and production firm based in Lagos Nigeria, which created RAVE TV in 2014, an interactive television platform, currently transmitting on GOTV (CH113), Startimes (CH125), MYTV and Abuja DSO Free TV, 745 in Lagos and also a Radio station situated in Asaba, Delta state; TREND FM 100.9.

She founded a Non-governmental organization known as the Inside Out with Agatha Foundation (IOWA) through which she hopes to employ the media as a tool for societal moral development.

Amata is a motivational speaker who has spoken at both international and national platforms. She has spoken at the Massachusetts Institute of Technology Africa Innovate Conference in Boston Massachusetts, the Women In Journalism Conference, the Rotary Club and also a Youth Empowerment Conference (Ambassadors Summit) at the University of Lagos.

== Awards ==
- World Economic Forum & All Ladies League Awards 2017, Woman of The Decade in Innovation & Leadership
- Women In Journalism Africa 2016, Recognition Award
- True Heroes Awards 2016, Special Recognition Award
- Eloy Awards 2015, Ladies who inspire in the media
- Mindset Media Limited, Excellence Awards 2015, Best TV Presenter Of The Year
- SME 100, Recognition Award
- Special Recognition Award – Champion of TV Broadcast Revolution in Nigeria

== Personal life ==
She was married to Fred Amata for 19 years, during which they had two children together. They have since dissolved their marriage.
