= Onobiren =

2026 Nigerian film

Onobiren: A Woman's Story is a 2026 Nigerian film. It was written by Laju Iren who also served as executive producer, directed by Famous Odion Iraoya and stars Ruby Akubueze, Patience Ozokwor, Deyemi Okanlawon, Bisola Aiyeola, Norbert Young, Desmond Bryce, and Chude Jideonwo.

== Background ==
Onobiren was produced by Laju Iren Films in collaboration with Africa No Filter and Creative Economy Practice. Shot in Warri, Delta State and in Lagos, the film is distributed by FilmOne Entertainment. Laju Iren wrote the script, as well as served as the executive producer while Famous Odion Iraoya directed the film.

The film premiered on 1 March 2026 at EbonyLife Cinemas in Victoria Island, Lagos. It became available in cinemas in Nigeria and Ghana from 6 March 2026. According to BusinessDay, the film earned N24.6 million naira during its opening weekend and later attained N100 million naira mark at the Nigerian box office.

== Cast ==
- Bisola Aiyeola
- Patience Ozokwor
- Deyemi Okanlawon
- Norbert Young
- Desmond Bryce
- Tan P
- Chude Jideonwo
- Ruby Akubueze
- Myde Glover

== Reception ==
Exploring feminism, TheCable called Onobiren a "the kind of film that quietly frees women in their minds, challenges men to see women beyond limitation, and reminds society that everyone benefits when women are allowed to reach their full potential". Onobiren ended its cinema run after seven weeks as one of Nollywood biggest hits, achieving the following in the West African Box office

- 138.1m in 7 weeks
- Most outstanding cinema debut of 2026
- Top 3 Nollywood releases of 2026
- Number One Film in West Africa for Two consecutive weeks
- Highest Grossing March 2026 Release
- Highest Grossing Film about women
- Highest Grossing South-South Film
- Highest Grossing Film by a Non-Actor Producer
- Highest Grossing Faith Based Film
- 9.1 rating on IMDb
- Crossed the 100m mark in three weeks

https://entertainmentreporterng.com/2026/04/28/onobiren-ends-cinema-run-as-one-of-2026s-top-nollywood-hits/?amp=1
