= Funmilade Akingbagbohun =

Nigerian Female Engineer

Funmilade Akingbagbohun FNSE COREN FNIMechE
- Born: Ogun State, Nigeria
- Other name: Olufunmilade Akingbabohun
- Education: University of Lagos; University of Ibadan; Yaba College of Technology
- Occupation: Mechanical Engineer
- Organizations: Nigerian Institution of Mechanical Engineers; Nigerian Federal Ministry of Interior; Nigerian Society of Engineers
- Predecessor: Muhammad Baba Ndaliman
- Successor: Alhassan Abdu Mohammed

Funmilade Akingbagbohun FNSE COREN FNIMechE is a Nigerian Mechanical Engineer known for being the first female National Chairman of the Nigerian Institute of Mechanical Engineers.

Akingbagbohun earned a Higher National Diploma from the Yaba College of Technology before earning her Master's degree from the University of Lagos. She earned her Bachelor of Engineering from the University of Ibadan.

She previously served as chairman of the Ikeja Branch of the Nigerian Society of Engineers

Akinbagboghun was inaugurated as the National Chairman of the Nigerian Institute of Mechanical Engineers in 2022 in succession of Muhammad Baba Ndaliman. On 24 April 2024, she was succeeded by Alhassan Abdu Mohammed

She is a fellow of the Council for the Regulation of Engineering in Nigeria. She is also a fellow of the Institution of Electrical Engineers.
