= University of Lagos =

Public research university in Lagos, Nigeria

- Motto: In deed and in truth
- Type: Public research university
- Established: 1962
- Religious affiliation: Nonsectarian
- Chancellor: Alhaji (Dr.) Abubakar IBN Umar Garbai El-Kanemi, The Shehu of Borno
- Vice-Chancellor: Folasade Ogunsola
- Academic staff: 1,736 (2017)
- Administrative staff: 552 (2017)
- Students: 52,106 (2024/25)
- Undergraduates: 35,177 (2024/25)
- Postgraduates: 10,943 (2024/25)
- Location: Lagos, Nigeria; 6°31′0″N 3°23′10″E
- Campus: Urban
- Colours: Gold and maroon
- Website: unilag.edu.ng

The University of Lagos (UNILAG) is a public research university located in Lagos, Nigeria, which was founded in 1962. UNILAG is one of the first generation universities in Nigeria and is ranked among the top universities in Africa in major education publications. The university presently has three campuses in the mainland of Lagos. Whereas two of its campuses are located at Yaba (the main campus in Akoka and the recently created campus at the former school of radiography), its college of medicine is located at Idi-Araba, Surulere. Its main campus is largely surrounded by the Lagos Lagoon and has 802 acres of land. As of 2024, the University of Lagos admitted around 8,500 undergraduate students annually and then enrolled over 57,000 students.

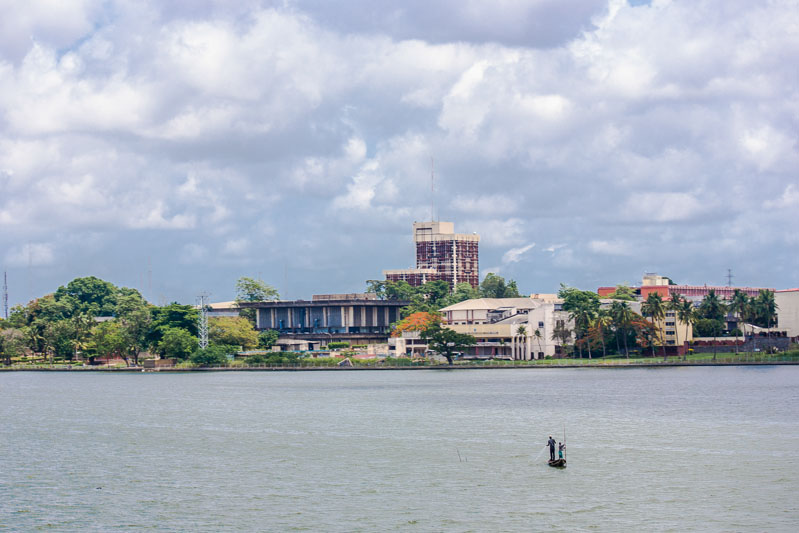
University of Lagos

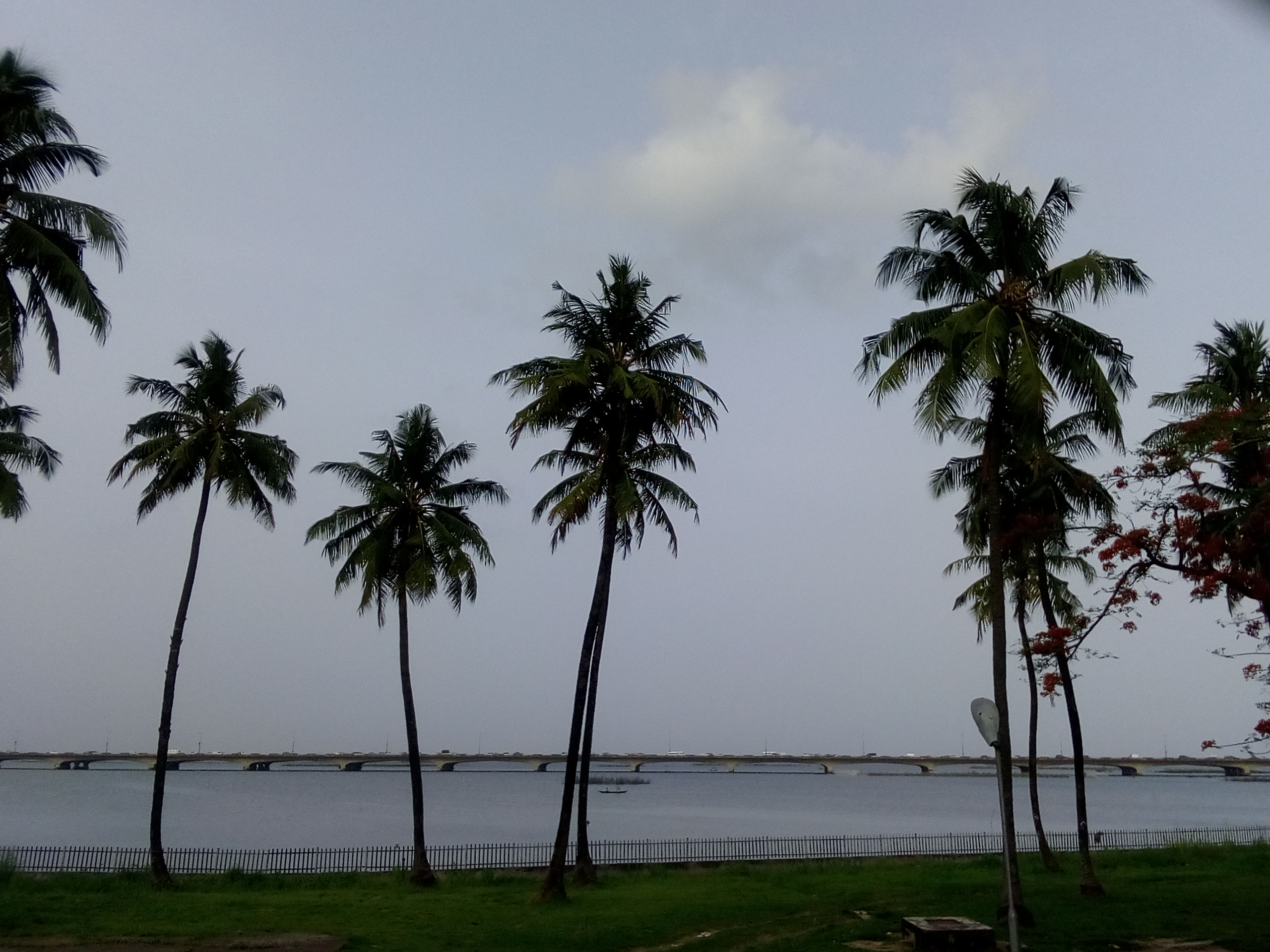
Lagoon Front, University of Lagos

== History ==
UNILAG was founded in 1962, two years after the independence of Nigeria from Britain. It was one of the first five universities created in the country, now known as "first generation universities". Eni Njoku was appointed as the first black vice-chancellor of the university in 1962, and he remained in office till 1965 when he was replaced by Saburi Biobaku. However, due to controversy surrounding his appointment, Saburi was stabbed by Kayode Adams, a student radical who believed Biobaku's appointment was unfair and ethnically motivated.

On 29 May 2012, the then President of Nigeria, Goodluck Jonathan, proposed to rename the University of Lagos to Moshood Abiola University in honour of Moshood Abiola, who died in jail as a political prisoner in 1998. The proposed name change became a subject of protests from students and alumni. The proposal was consequently jettisoned as the Nigerian federal government gave in to the protests incited by the proposed name change.

A visitation panel, created to look into the affairs of the university between 2016 and 2020 detected cases of financial abuses from top officials and ordered the university to close accounts with commercial banks.

Folasade Ogunsola is the current Vice Chancellor and the first female to be such in the history of the school. She was appointed on 7 October 2022 and assumed office on 12 November 2022.

== Academics and research ==
University rankings

Global – Overall
- CWUR World: 1924 (2022–2023)
- QS World: 1401+ (2024)
- THE World: 1001–1200 (2024)
- USNWR Global: 587 (2022–2023)

Regional – Overall
- THE Africa: =25 (2024)
- USNWR Africa: 14 (2022–23)

National – Overall
- CWUR National: 3 (2022–2023)
- QS National: =1 (2024)
- THE National: =3 (2024)
- USNWR National: 2 (2022–2023)

The university has remained one of the most competitive in the country in terms of admissions. With approximately 57,000 students as of 2013, the University of Lagos has one of the largest student populations of any university in the country. The University of Lagos is one of the twenty-five federal universities which are overseen and accredited by the National Universities Commission (NUC).

A 2020 publication of Forbes magazine ranked the school as the third best university in Africa for entrepreneurship after University of Cape Town and Makerere University, tagging University of Lagos the "startup powerhouse" college for Nigerian students.

The University has been called "The university of first choice and the nation's pride." The university's research activity was one of the major criteria used by the National Universities Commission (NUC) in adjudging the university as the best university in Nigeria at the Nigerian University System Annual Merit Award (NUSAMA) in 2008.

The University of Lagos, College of Medicine is associated with Lagos University Teaching Hospital(LUTH). On 29 June 2020, the university received robots, CRZR, from platform capital as a donation to fight the spread of COVID-19.

=== Affiliate institutions and colleges ===
Centre for Biodiversity Conservation and Ecosystem Management (CEBCEM) The centre, established in April 2018, focuses on biodiversity management, conservation and monitoring of sustainable ecosystem through collaborative research. CEBCEM provides a platform for research and education for students of tertiary institutions as well as advocate for environmental awareness. The Centre for Biodiversity Conservation and Ecosystem Management is the response of the University of Lagos to the threat of biodiversity in Nigeria. This response includes proposing local solutions to biodiversity conservation challenges which is facilitated through institution research grants such as TETfund.

== Administration and leadership ==
The current principal members of the university administration and their positions are as follows:

Office	holders
Visitor	President of the Federal Republic of Nigeria Bola Tinubu
Pro-Chancellor & Chairman	Chief Wole Olanipekun, SAN
Chancellor	The Shehu of Borno, Alhaji (Dr.) Abubakar IBN Umar Garbai El-Kanemi
Vice-Chancellor	Professor Folasade Ogunsola
Deputy Vice-Chancellor (Academics & Research)	Professor Bolanle Olufunmilayo Oboh
Deputy Vice-Chancellor (Management Services)	Professor Muyiwa Falaiye
Deputy Vice-Chancellor (Development Services)	Professor Foluso Ebun Afolabi Lesi
Registrar	Mrs. Abosede Victoria Wickliffe
Bursar	Mrs. Oluwafunmilola Yetunde Adekunle
University Librarian	Prof. Olatokunbo Christopher Okiki
Provost (College of Medicine)	Professor Ademola Ayodele Oremosu

== Vice-Chancellors ==
- Professor Eni Njoku: 1962–1965
- Professor Saburi Biobaku: 1965–1971
- Professor Jacob F. Adeniyi Ajayi: 1972–1978
- Professor Babatunde Kwaku Adadevoh: 1978–1980
- Professor Akinpelu Oludele Adesola: 1981–1988
- Professor Nurudeen Oladapo Alao: 1988–1995
- Professor Jelili Adebisi Omotola: 1995–2000
- Professor Oyewusi Ibidapo Obe: Ag, 2000–2002; 2002–2007
- Professor Tolu Olukayode Odugbemi: 2007–2010
- Professor Babatunde Adetokunbo Sofoluwe: 2010–2012
- Professor Rahmon Ade Bello: 2012–2017
- Professor Oluwatoyin Ogundipe: 2017–2022
- Professor Folasade Ogunsola: 2022–present

== Notable alumni, faculty and staff ==
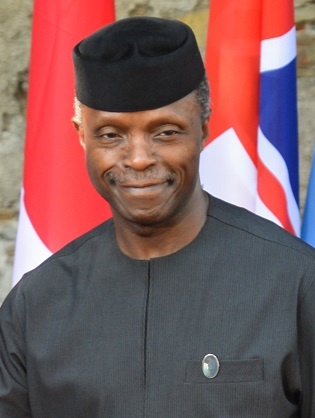
Former Vice-president Yemi Osinbajo of Nigeria is an alumnus of the University of Lagos

The university has educated many notable alumni, eminent scientists, politicians, lawyers, business icons, writers, entertainers, monarchs, countless technocrats, recipients of the Nigerian national order of merit, fellows of the various learned academies. As of September 2020, one Nobel Prize laureate and one Pulitzer Prize laureate have been affiliated with University of Lagos as students, alumni, faculty, or staff.

=== Notable faculty ===
- Grace Alele-Williams
- Solomon Babalola
- J. P. Clark
- Lazarus Ekwueme
- Akinsola Olusegun Faluyi
- Marita Golden
- Karen King-Aribisala
- Olufemi Majekodunmi
- Yemi Osinbajo
- Oyeleye Oyediran
- Ken Saro-Wiwa
- Wole Soyinka

=== Notable alumni ===
Amongst the alumni of the University of Lagos, Akoka and other institutions that fall under that banner are;

- Wande Abimbola, yoruba professor.
- Bilikiss Adebiyi-Abiola , recycler in Nigeria.
- Olusola Jegede, lawyer and auther
- Niyi Adebayo, first executive governor of Ekiti State and former minister of industry, trade and investment.
- Oladipupo Olatunde Adebutu, Nigerian politician.
- Olamilekan Adegbite, minister of mines and steel development.
- Wale Adenuga, publisher and film producer.
- Ayo Aderinwale, Nigerian diplomat.
- Kola Adesina, Nigeraian businessman
- Kunle Adeyemi, principal of NLÉ, an architecture, design and urbanism firm, Amsterdam.
- Akachi Adimora-Ezeigbo, author and educator.
- Adedayo Clement Adeyeye, Nigerian journalist and politician.
- Gbenga Adeyinka, Nigerian actor, comedian, radio and TV presenter.
- Osh Agabi, bioengineer and entrepreneur
- Goddy Jedy Agba
- Mercy Aigbe, actress, director, fashionista and businesswoman.
- Abisoye Ajayi-Akinfolarin, women's activist, CNN heroes top 10 awardee for 2018.
- Fabian Ajogwu, lawyer and SAN.
- Lola Akande, author and academic.
- Omoyemi Akerele, fashion designer and founder of Style House Files.
- Bola Akindele, Nigerian businesses man and philanthropist.
- Funke Akindele, award-winning actress and producer.
- Funmilade Akingbagbohun, first female National Chairman of the Nigerian Institute of Mechanical Engineers
- Rilwan Akiolu, current Oba of Lagos.
- Winifred Akpani, businesswoman, and founder/CEO of Northwest Petroleum & Gas Company Limited
- Yemi Alade, award-winning musician.
- Akinwunmi Ambode, former governor of Lagos State.
- Abayomi Arigbabu, professor of mathematics and current commissioner of education, Ogun State.
- Daré Art-Aladé, singer.
- Emilia Asim-Ita, co-founder of The Future Awards Africa.
- Regina Askia-Williams, nurse practitioner, actress, and former miss unilag.
- Jelili Atiku, Nigerian actor.
- Bolanle Austen-Peters, lawyer and businesswoman.
- Adewale Ayuba, singer.
- Yewande Akinse Nigerian poet, author and entrepreneur
- Epiphany Azinge, lawyer, senior advocate of Nigeria and former DG of Nigerian Institute of Advanced Legal Studies.
- Wale Babalakin, lawyer and businessman.
- Tunde Bakare, Serving Overseer of the Citadel Global Community Church, formerly known as The Latter Rain Assembly.
- Tobi Bakre, actor and presenter.
- Lekan Balogun, dramatist and theatre art director.
- Reekado Banks, singer and songwriter.
- Philip Begho, writer.
- William Benson, Actor and film maker
- Crystal Chigbu, social entrepreneur.
- Stella Damasus, actress and singer.
- Gbenga Daniel, former governor of Ogun State.
- Raquel Kasham Daniel, author and educator
- Ibrahim Hassan Dankwambo, former governor of Gombe State.
- Ousainou Darboe, current Gambian minister of foreign affairs.
- Fola David, medical doctor and visual artist.
- Dipo Dina, Nigerian politician.
- Denrele Edun, award-winning radio and television personality.
- Ufuoma Ejenobor, actor and model.
- Grace Ekpiwhre, former minister of science and technology.
- eLDee, former Nigerian-American rapper, singer and record producer.
- Omogie Ojei, visual artist and poet.
- Tony Elumelu, economist, entrepreneur and philanthropist.
- Lawrence Oloche Emmanuel, MON and entrepreneur
- Obiageli Ezekwesili, accountant and politician.
- Lekan Fatodu, journalist and politician.
- Kayode Fayemi, former governor of Ekiti State and former minister of solid minerals development.
- Femi Gbajabiamila, lawyer, lawmaker and current speaker of Nigeria's 9th house of representatives.
- Chika Ike, Nigerian actress, television personality, producer, business woman, philanthropist and former model.
- Linda Ikeji, blogger.
- IllRymz, musician, radio and television personality.
- Yakubu Itua, former member federal house of representative 1983 and former judge High Court of Justice, Benin-City.
- Chude Jideonwo, lawyer, journalist and media entrepreneur.
- Adetokunbo Kayode, Nigerian corporate lawyer, tax expert and international arbitrator, former minister of labour, minister of justice, minister of tourism, culture and national orientation.
- Matilda Kerry-Osazuwa, founder of the George Kerry Life Foundation, doctor and former MBGN
- Lil Kesh, Nigerian singer, rapper and songwriter.
- Laycon, rapper, singer and songwriter, winner Big Brother Naija season 5.
- Kaycee Madu, Nigerian-Canadian lawyer and current minister of justice and solicitor general of Alberta.
- Magixx, Nigerian singer and songwriter.
- George Magoha, surgeon and academic.
- Seyi Makinde, electrical engineer, businessman and current governor of Oyo State.
- Toke Makinwa, award-winning radio and television personality.
- Bekeme Masade-Olowola, social entrepreneur.
- Mayorkun, award-winning musician.
- Oliver Mbamara, lawyer and film maker.
- Ufuoma McDermott, model and actress.
- Mo'Cheddah, Musical artist.
- Lai Mohammed, lawyer and current minister of information and culture.
- Ifeanyi Chudy Momah, lawyer and legislator.
- John Momoh, chairman, Channels Television Group.
- Ramsey Nouah, Nigerian actor and director.
- Genevieve Nnaji, award-winning actress, director and producer.
- Chukwuemeka Nwajiuba, former minister of state for education.
- Omoayena Odunbaku, Nigerian development expert
- Akin Babalola Kamar Odunsi, politician and businessman.
- Uche Ogah, former Nigerian minister of state for mines and steel development.
- Babatunde Ogunnaike, engineering professor.
- Ikedi Ohakim, politician and former governor of Imo state.
- Bayo Ojo, SAN and former Attorney General of the Federal Republic of Nigeria.
- Wole Olanipekun, lawyer and Senior Advocate of Nigeria.
- Dele Olojede, journalist, first African born winner of the Pulitzer Prize .
- Simbo Olorunfemi, poet, journalist and television producer.
- Daniel Kolawole Olukoya, Pastor, Scientist and Professor
- Omalicha, Nigerian radio presenter.
- Ogbonnaya Onu, first executive governor of Abia State and former minister of science and technology.
- Shade Omoniyi, actress
- Ijeoma Onyeator – journalist and news anchor
- Felix Orji, bishop of the Anglican Diocese of All Nations
- Olufunke Oshonaike, Nigerian table tennis player and the only woman to go to the Olympics seven times
- Yemi Osinbajo, former vice-president, Federal Republic of Nigeria.
- Prof. Abraham Osinubi, Nigerian Professor, medical doctor and Anatomist.
- Bruce Ovbiagele, award-winning neurologist, editor, scientist, and healthcare leader.
- Helen Ovbiagele, novelist.
- Tim Owhefere, Nigerian politician.
- Sasha P, rapper, musician, businesswoman, lawyer and motivational speaker.
- Kemebradikumo Pondei, acting managing director of Niger Delta Development Commission.
- Omowunmi Sadik, scientist and professor.
- Iziaq Adekunle Salako, Medical Practitioner, Politician and current minister of state for health and social welfare
- Babajide Sanwo-Olu, Nigerian politician, businessman and current governor of Lagos State.
- Broda Shaggi, a comedian.
- Joke Silva, award-winning actress, director and producer.
- Ayo Sogunro, writer, satirist and lawyer.
- Omoyele Sowore, founder, Sahara Reporters.
- Gabriel Suswam, former governor of Benue State .
- Vector, Nigerian rapper and song writer.
- Farida Mzamber Waziri, former chairman, EFCC.
- Olajide Williams, professor of neurology at Columbia University.
- Winifred Ekanem Oyo-Ita, former Head of the Civil Service of the Federation

== Architecture, monuments and vistas ==
Campus of UNILAG

Senate building

Afe Babalola Auditorium

Geosciences Centre

NORD centre

VIAD House

Memorial Babatunde Sofoluwe

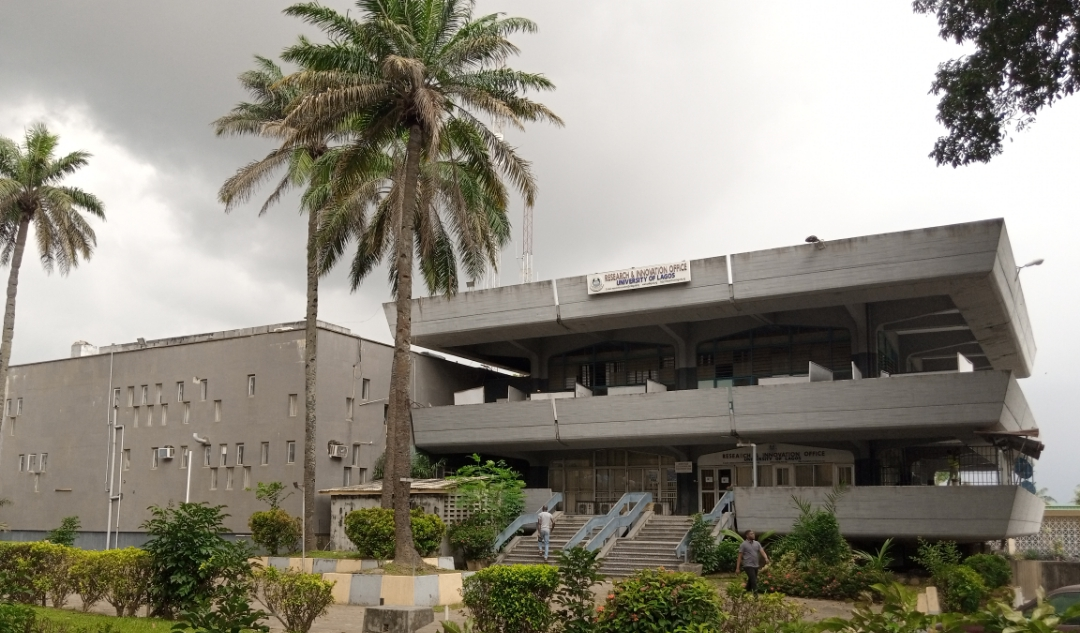
Research and innovation office

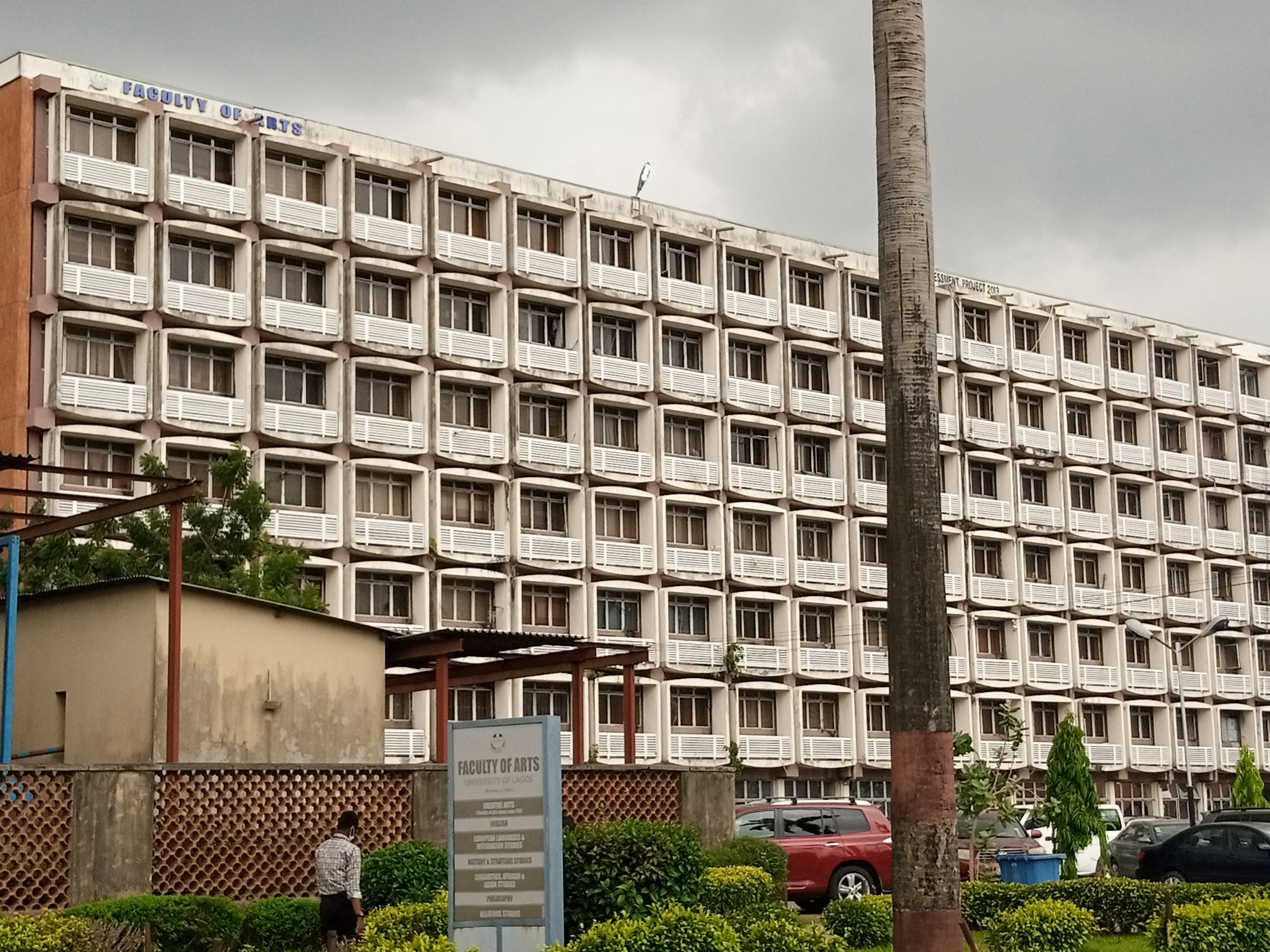
Faculty of Art

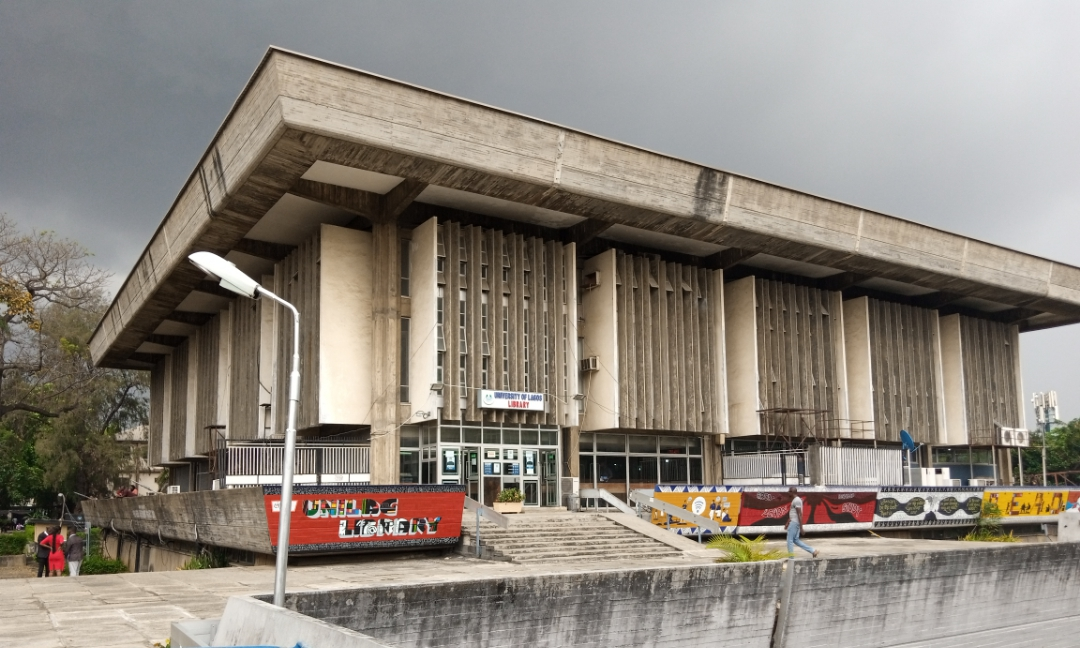
University Library

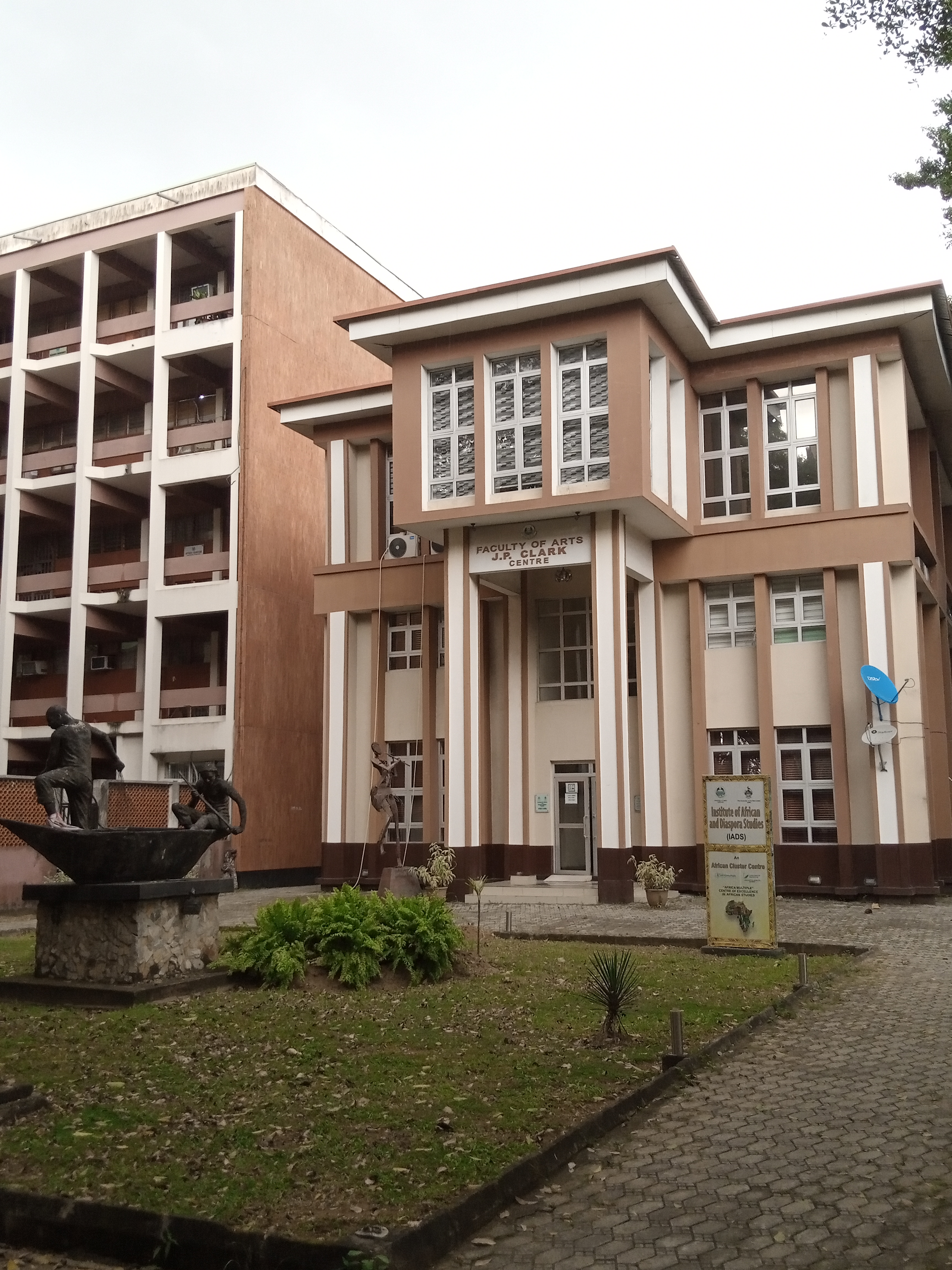
J. P Clark Center

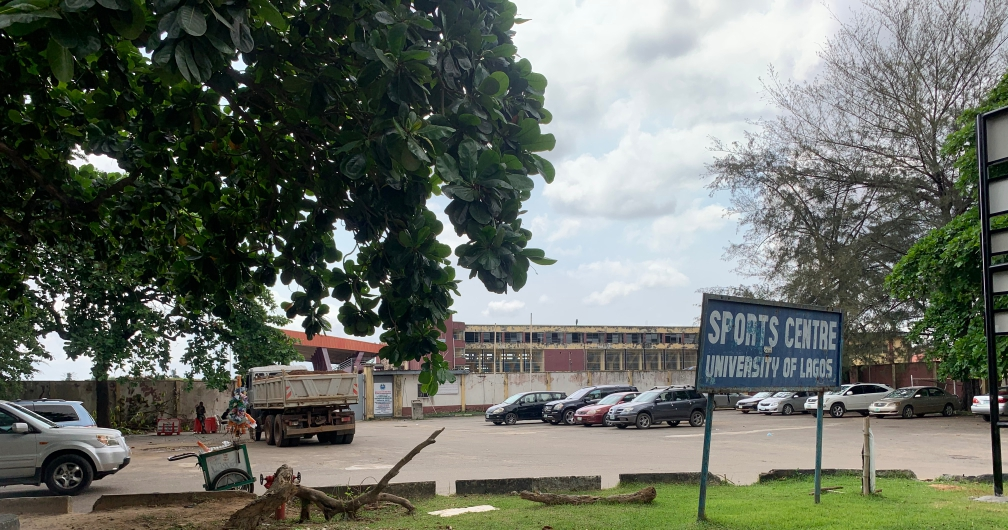
Sport center

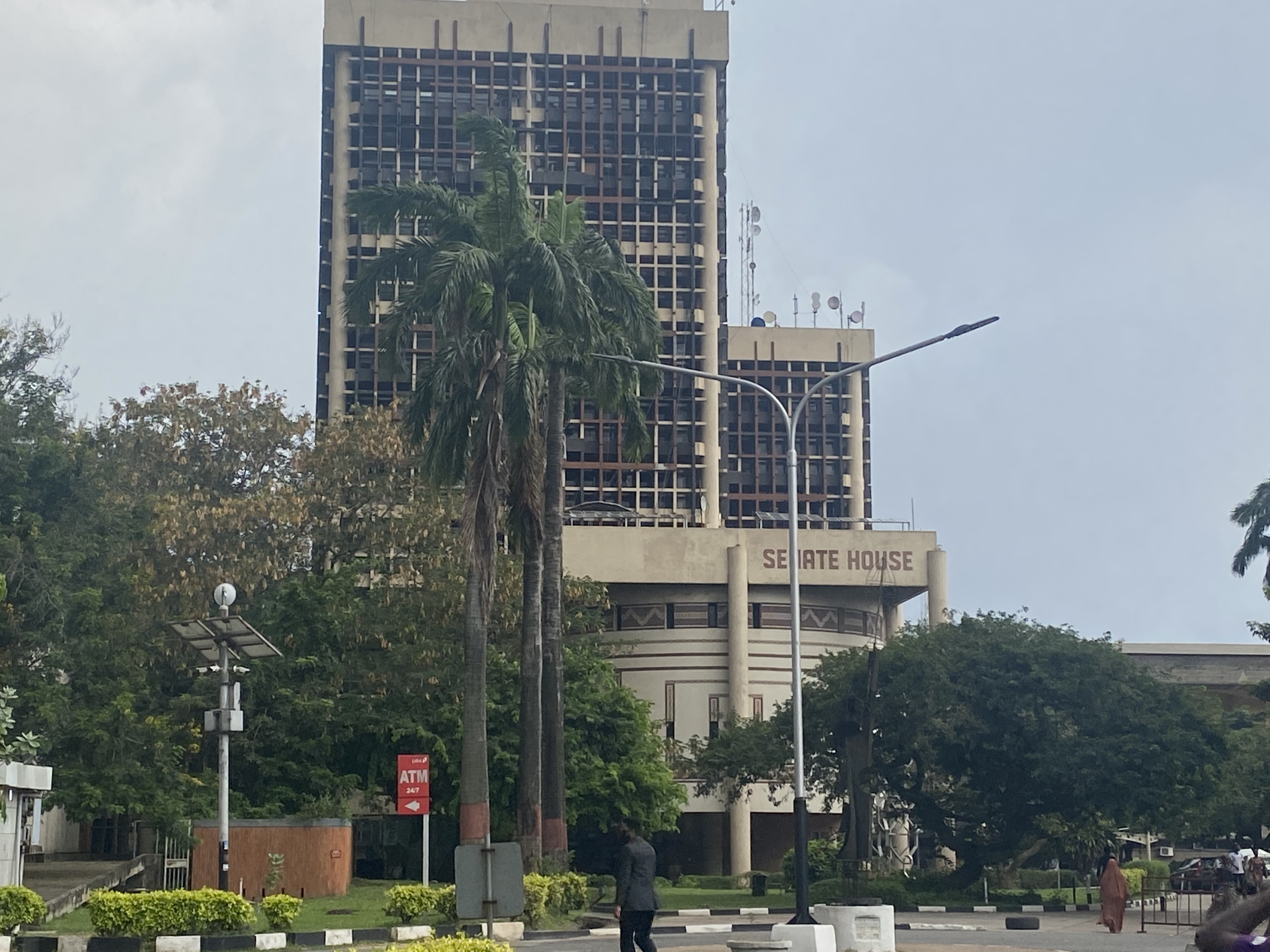
Unilag_Senate_house

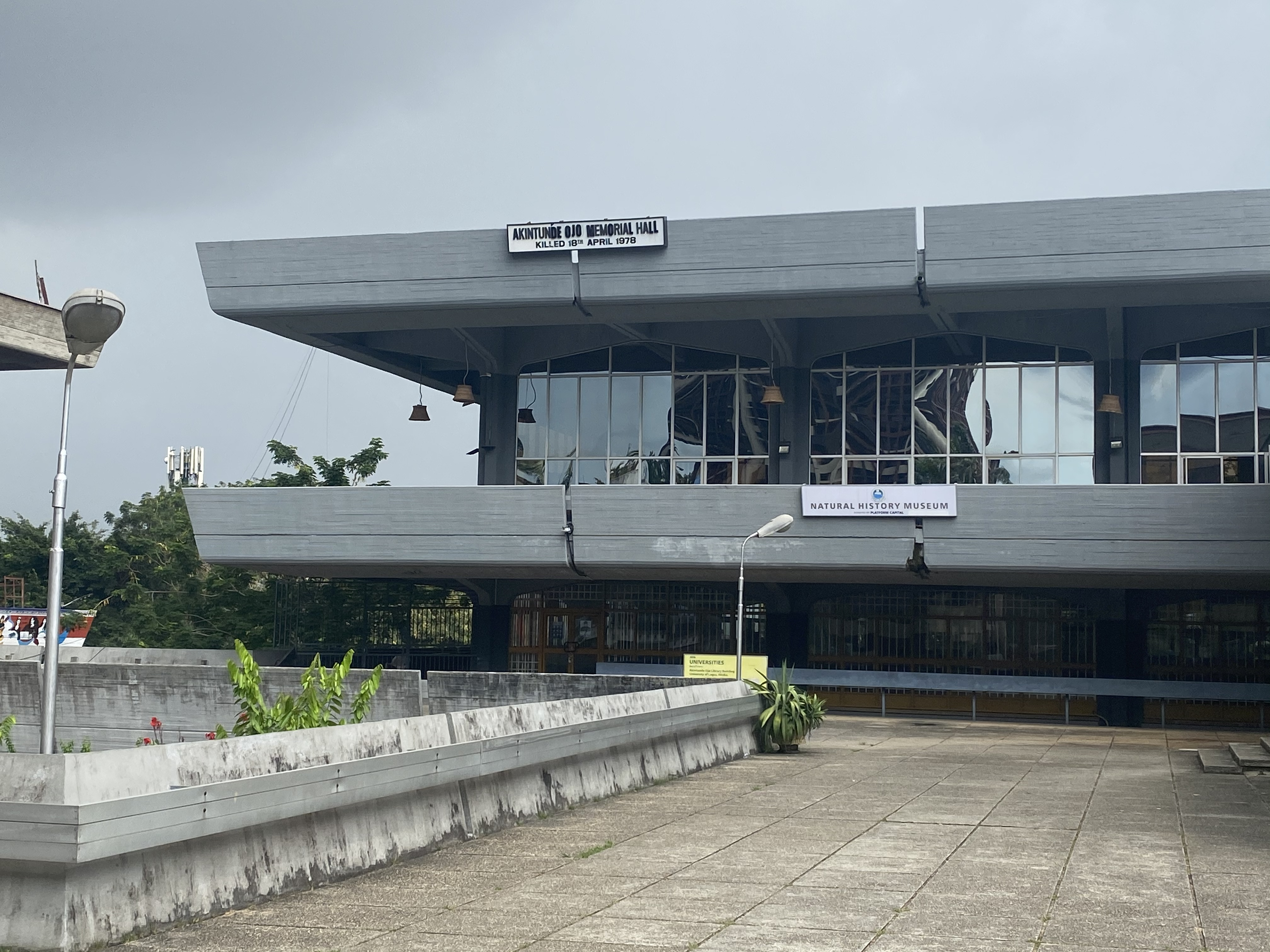
Akintunde Ojo Memorial Hall

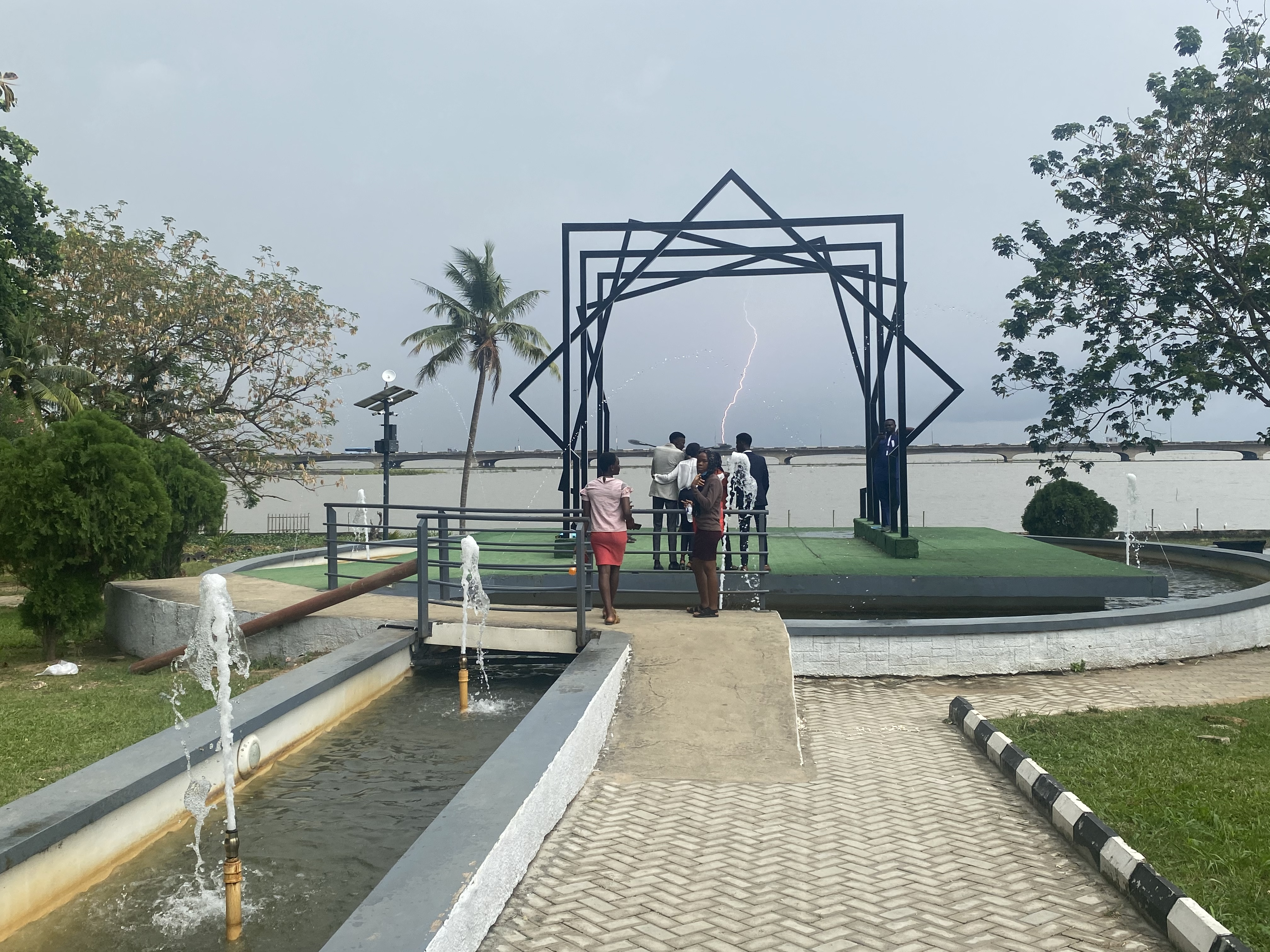
Unilag Lagoon Front Fountain

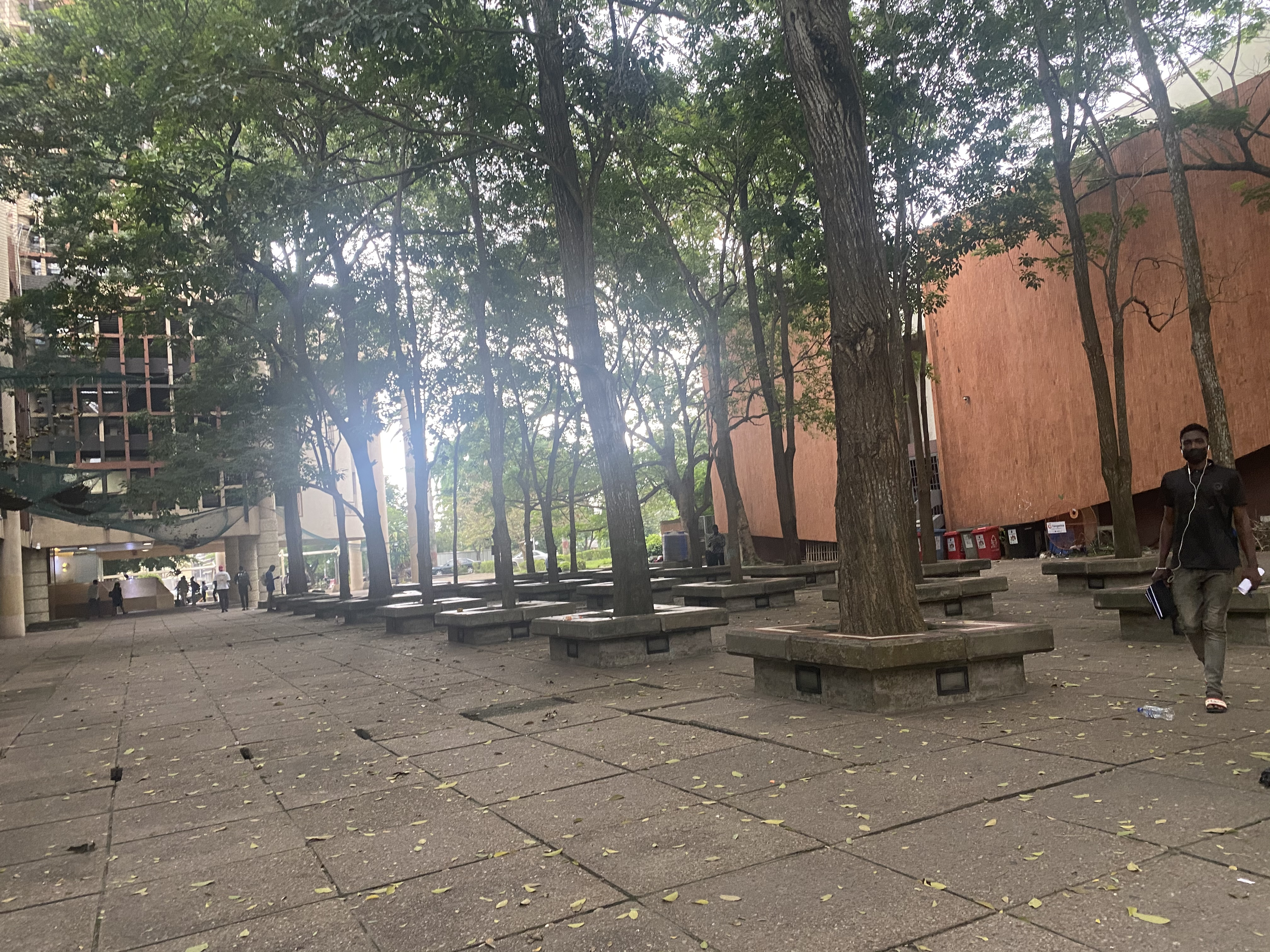
Quadrangle, Faculty of Arts

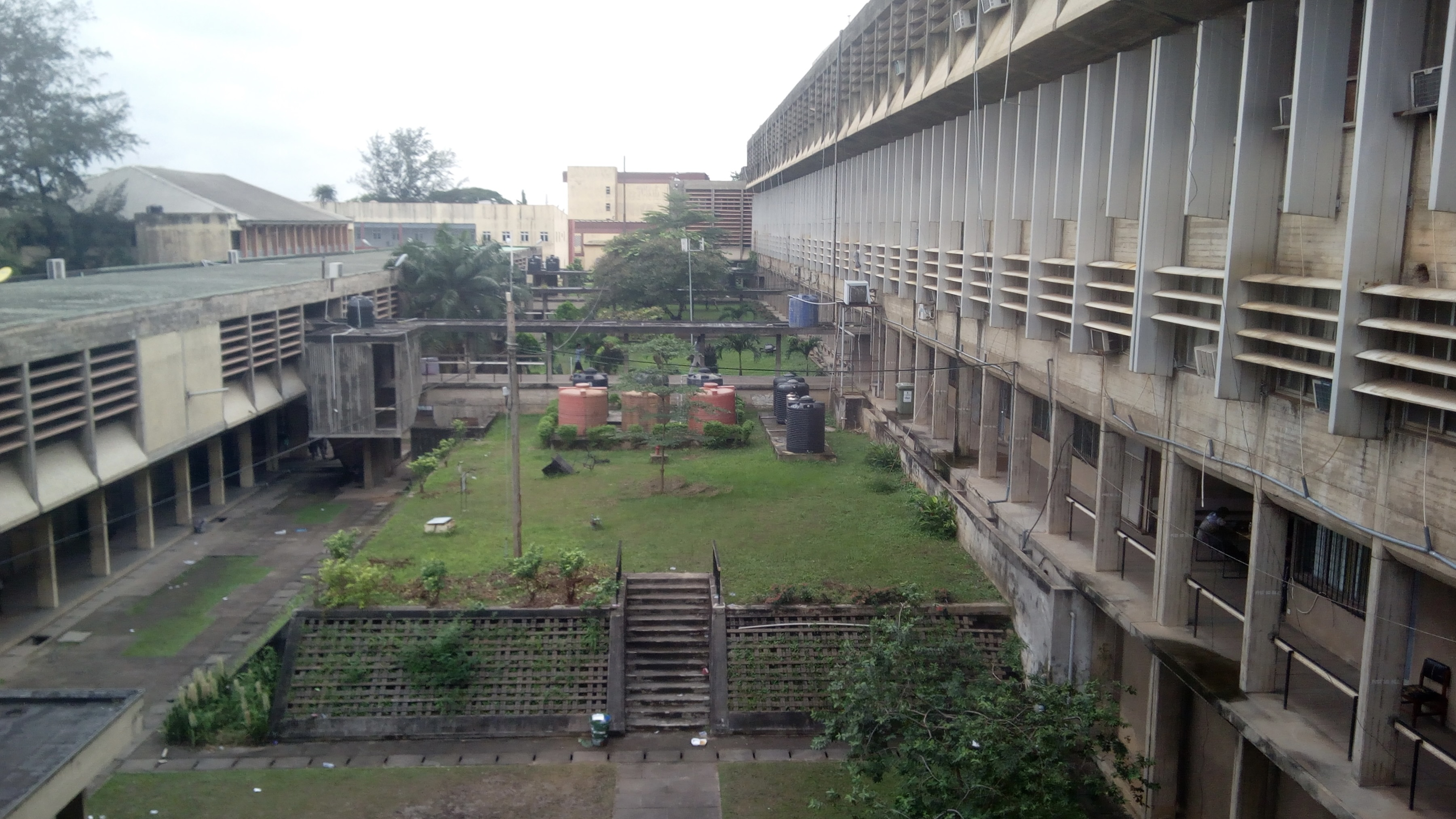
Faculty of Science

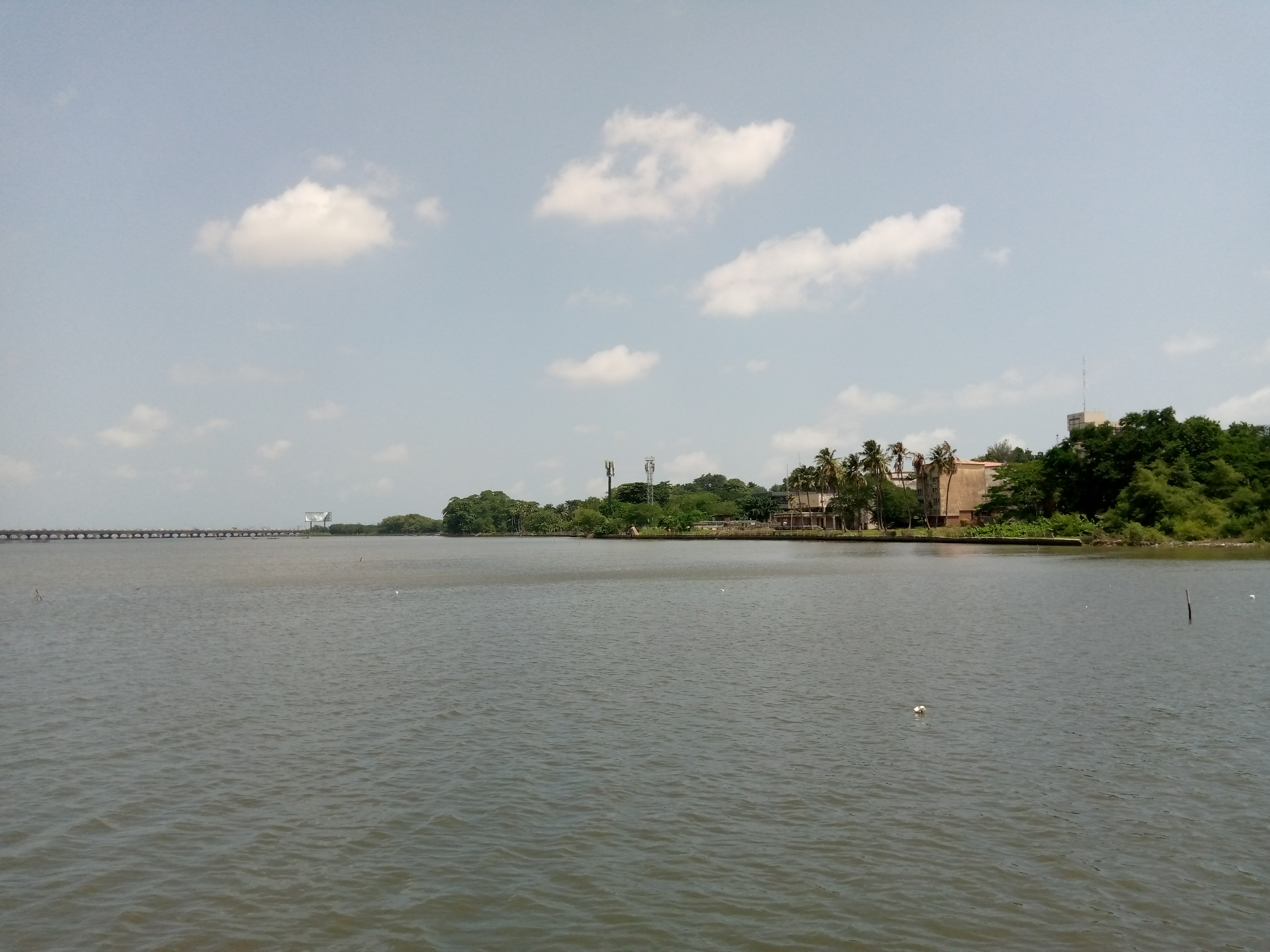
University of Lagos Lagoon front view from Seaside cottage theatre, Bariga

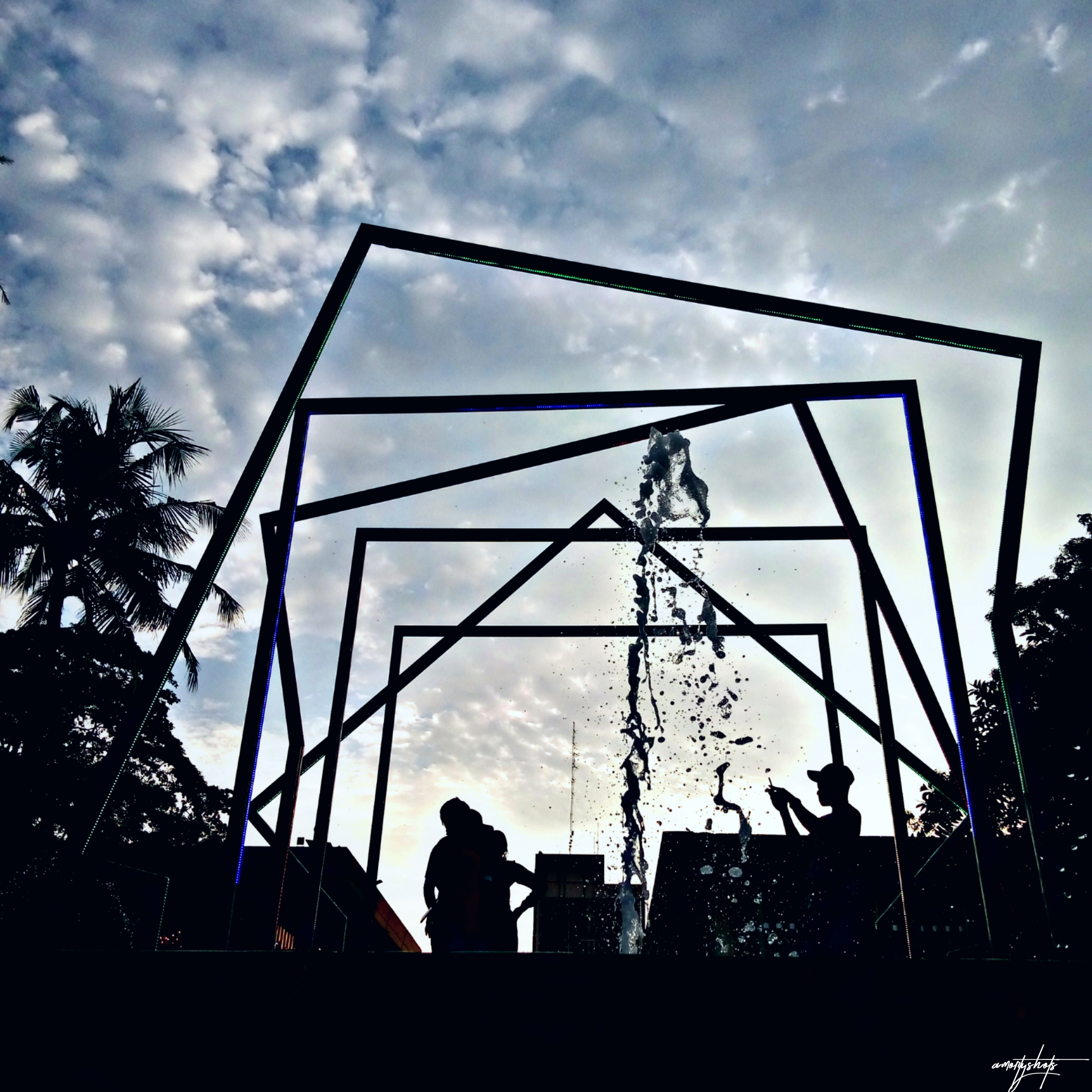
Lagoon Front Silhouette

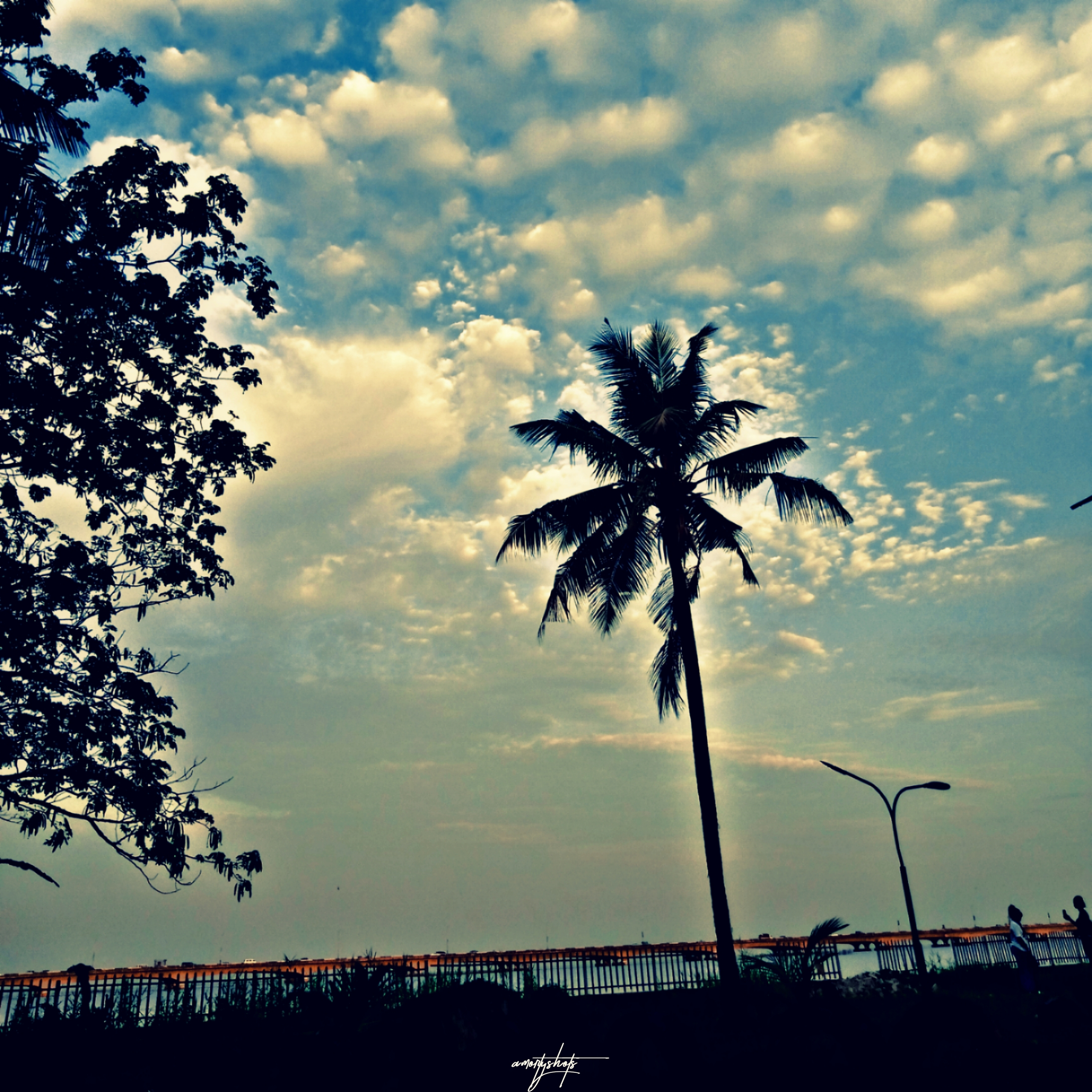
View of the Third Mainland Bridge From the Lagoon Front

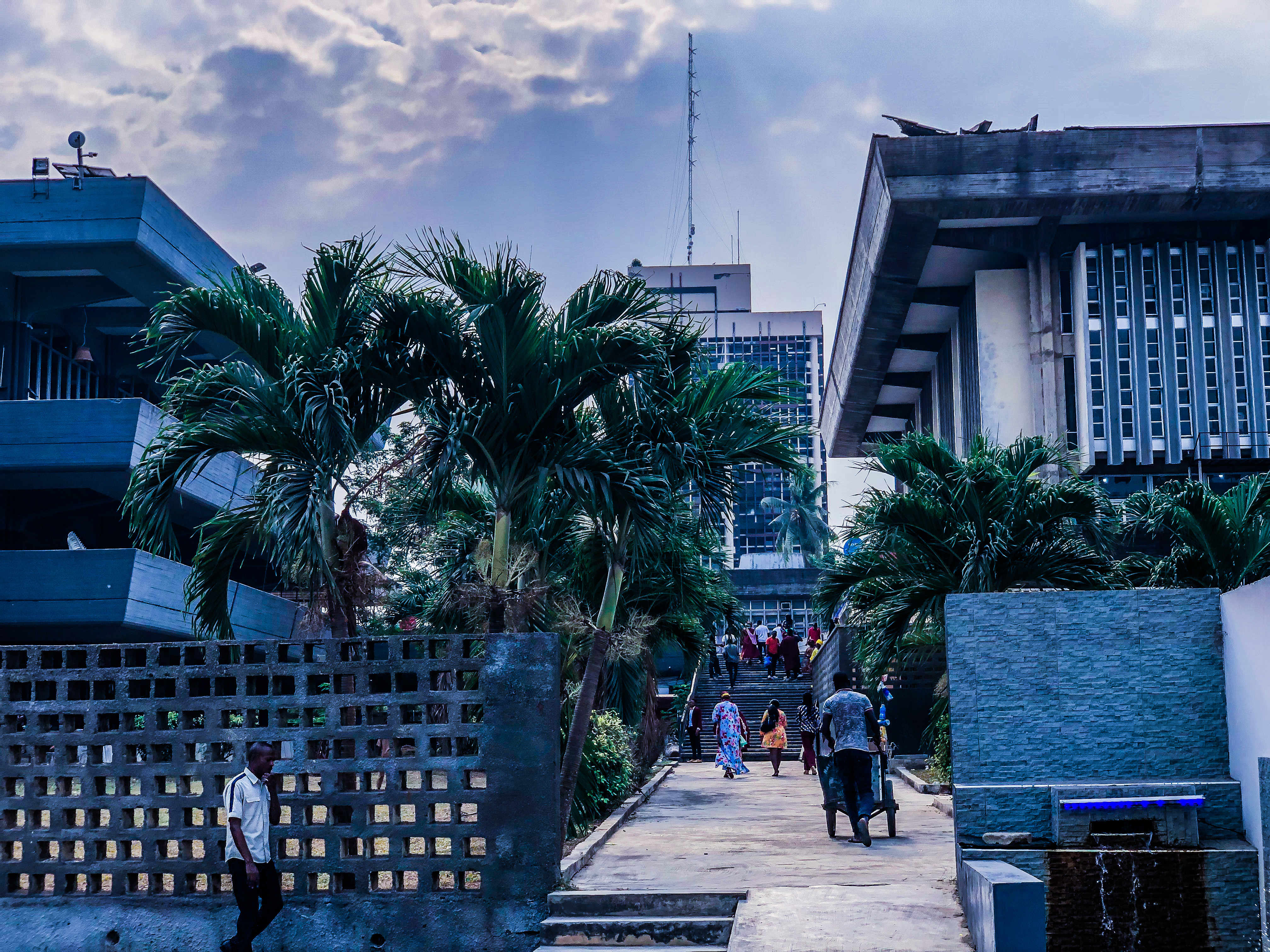
Green Space in University of Lagos

== See also ==
- List of universities in Nigeria
