= Omoayena Odunbaku =

Nigerian development expert

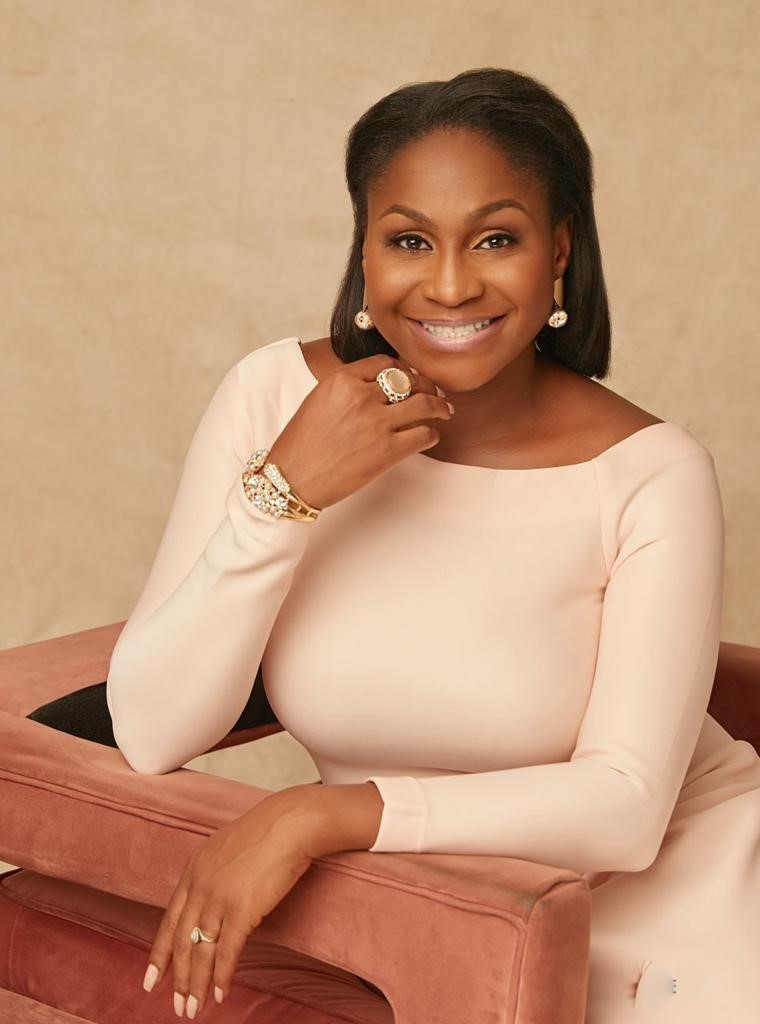
- Odunbaku in 2023
- Education: Federal Government College, Ilorin; University of Lagos
- Occupation: Development expert
- Spouse: Yinka Odunbaku

Omoayena Rosemary Odunbaku is a Nigerian development expert, university lecturer, human settlement officer with UN Habitat, and founder of the organization Her Ability Hub.

== Career ==
Odunbaku holds a PhD in Urban and Regional Planning from the University of Lagos, Nigeria. She was a lecturer of the Department of Urban and Regional Planning at the University of Lagos between 2012 and 2018, and a lecturer assistant of the Department of Town Planning at the Moshood Abiola Polytechnic, Abeokuta between 2006 and 2007.

She joined the United Nations Human Settlements Programme (UN-Habitat) as a Programme Manager in 2014 before becoming the Human Settlement Officer, Regional Office for Africa (ROAf) in 2016.

== Recognition and awards ==
In 2012, she received the Distinguished Researcher award from the University of Lagos.

== Writing ==
In 2021, she authored a 331-page biography, Omoh, which documents her life journey.
