= Ayo Sogunro =

Nigerian author, essayist and human rights lawyer

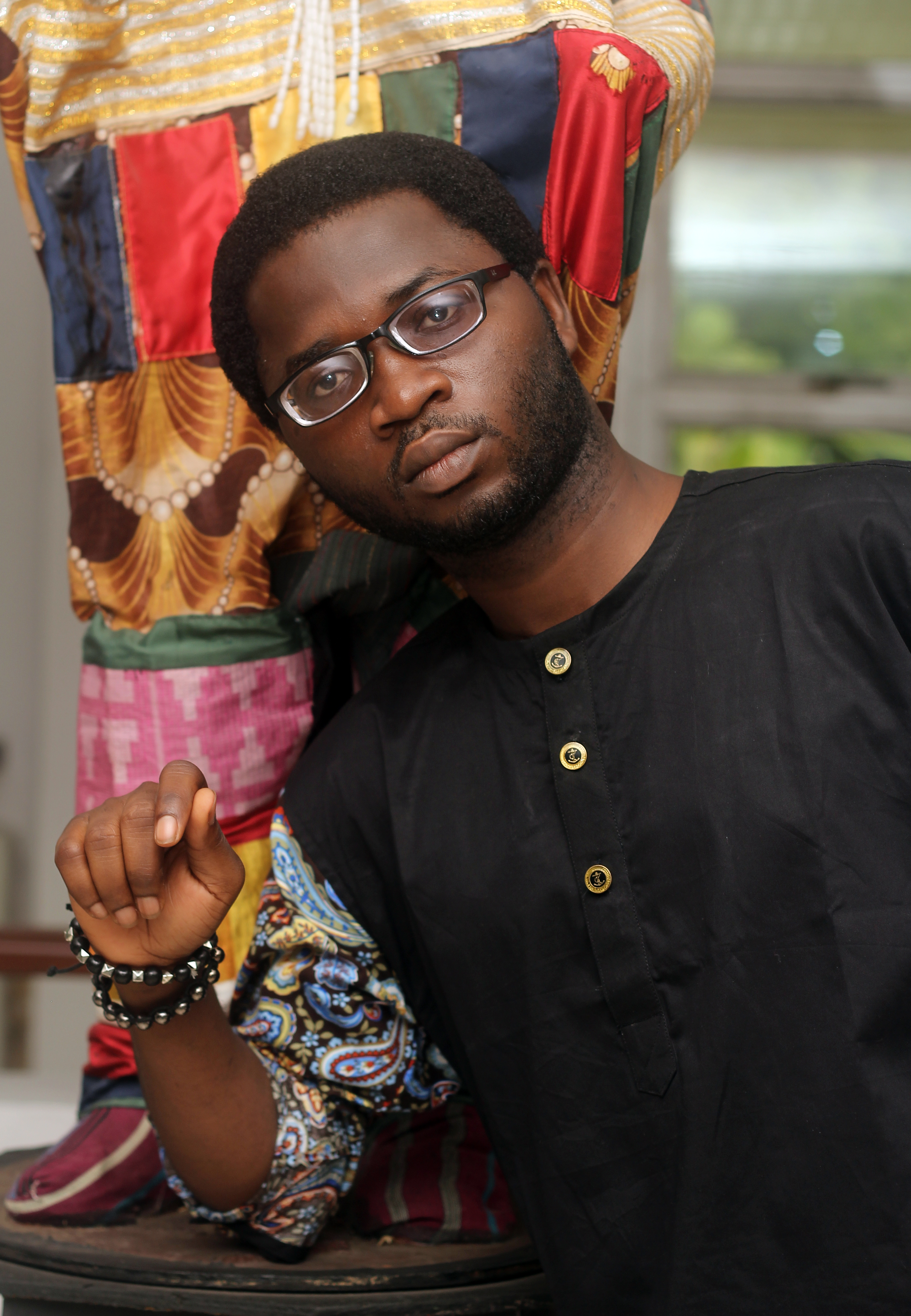
- Born: Ayọ̀délé Ọlọ́runfúnmi Sógunró; Abeokuta, Ogun State, Nigeria
- Education: University of Lagos
- Occupations: Lawyer, writer

Ayo Sogunro (born 1984) is a Nigerian author, essayist and human rights lawyer. He is known for his work in social advocacy and for the protection of civil rights and the rights of sexual minorities in Nigeria. He was listed as one of the "100 Most Influential Nigerians" in 2017.

== Life and work ==
Sogunro was born in Abeokuta and attended the University of Lagos for his law degree. He was called to the Nigerian Bar in 2008.

His collection of short stories The Wonderful Life of Senator Boniface and other Sorry Tales was listed as one of the top 25 Nigerian books of 2013. It is a collection of 14 stories about Nigerian and Nigerians, "full of sorry tales interfused with poetry, exploring themes of human nature in general, and Nigerian social psychology in particular" The work has been described as a work that "brings to life – and death – the spirit of Lagos and Lagosians.

In 2014, his collection of critical essays "Everything in Nigeria is Going to Kill You" was released. Its central idea is that Nigeria had evolved from "not taking care of you" into "actively trying to kill you". In 2016, his essay "One More Nation Bound in Freedom", originally published in Transition, was nominated for the Gerald Kraak Award for African Writing.

== Bibliography ==
- Cracks in the Ivory Tower Faith Unity Press, 2004. ISBN 978-2-94333-9
- Death in the Dawn Createspace Independent Publishing Platform, 2013. ISBN 978-1-482-08198-5
- The Wonderful Life of Senator Boniface and other Sorry Tales Bookvine, 2013. ISBN 978-9-789-34076-7
- Everything in Nigeria is Going to Kill You Shecrownlita Scribbles, 2014. ISBN 978-9-789-43268-4
