= Abisoye Ajayi-Akinfolarin =

Nigerian women's activist

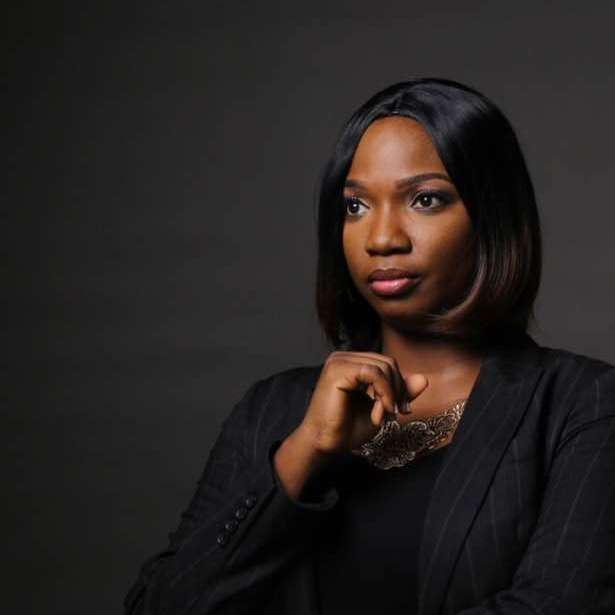
- Abisoye Ajayi-Akinfolarin, 2018
- Born: 19 May 1985 (40 years); Ondo State, Nigeria
- Education: Harvard University University of Lagos
- Occupations: women's rights activist, entrepreneur
- Notable work: The Founder and Chief Executive Officer of Pearls Africa Youth Foundation
- Website: Pearls Africa.org

Abisoye Ajayi-Akinfolarin (born Abisoye Abosede Ajayi, 19 May 1985) is a social impact entrepreneur and human development expert.

She is the Founder and Chief Executive Officer of Pearls Africa Youth Foundation, a non-profit organization focused on educating young girls and women in underserved communities through providing access to technology proficiency and mentoring for the overarching purpose of economic independence. In the year 2018, in November, Ajayi-Akinfolarin was named one of the top ten CNN Heroes. She was listed as one of BBC 100 Women in Tech in the same month.

== Early life and education ==
Abisoye was born into the family of late Chief James Olaniyi Ajayi and Christina Titilayo Ajayi in Akure, Ondo State in Nigeria. She attended the Nigerian Institute of Information Technology (NIIT), she further attended the University of Lagos where she earned her bachelor's degree in Business Administration, a course based on core business functions that accentuate the application of information technology, teamwork, and problem-solving. Abisoye is a Mason fellow with a Mid-Career Masters of Public Administration, an alumnus of the Harvard Kennedy School. She is also an Adrian Cheng Fellow, a fellowship for change-makers committed to addressing pressing social problems in new and creative ways.

== Professional career ==
Ajayi-Akinfolarin started her career in EDP Audit and Security Associates as a trainee consultant, 3 years later she worked as a full-time Associate Consultant and Data Analyst for 5 years.

Ajayi-Akinfolarin founded Pearls Africa Youth Foundation in 2015, an NGO that is focused on stimulating the cause and advancement of susceptible young girls and women.

Ajayi-Akinfolarin's organization organized GirlsCoding, a flagship program of Pearls Africa. Wanting to help close that gap and encourage more women in her field, Ajayi-Akinfolarin established her own non-profit organization.

In 2012, Ajayi-Akinfolarin founded Pearls Africa Youth Foundation, a Non-Governmental Organization that assists girls in developing technology skills through various programs including; GirlsCoding, G.C Mentors, GirlsInSTEM and Empowered Hands. Since 2012, the organization has trained over 10,000 young women to code.

== Awards and recognition ==
- CNN Heroes honoree, 2018
- BBC 100 Women, 2018
- ONE's 2018 Women of the Year Awards
