= Chude Jideonwo =

Nigerian TV host, filmmaker and media entrepreneur (born 1985)

- Born: Ifechukwude Osanedum Jideonwo; 16 March 1985 (age 41); Nigeria
- Citizenship: Nigerian
- Education: Mayflower School
- Alma mater: University of Lagos; Pan African University
- Occupation: Media Entrepreneur
- Awards: Yale World Fellow; Business Day 40 Under 40 (2012);Forbes 30 Under 30: Africa's Best Young Entrepreneurs; CNBC Young Business Leader of the Year
- Website: chudejideonwo.me

Chude Jideonwo (born 16 March 1985) is a Nigerian TV host, filmmaker and media entrepreneur.

He is the chair of HBC Holdings and co-founder of Red Africa and Joy, Inc, an American corporation with a Nigerian subsidiary. He has worked in media, advertising and public relations. He is the executive producer and host of #WithChude, a special series of targeted multimedia (video, audio, text, event) conversations and investigations.

He is also director of #ChudeExplains, a series of films with a focus on social justice and culture and co-founder of The Future Project. Through Red Africa, his team has led communication campaigns for two Nigerian presidents and a Ghanaian president. In 2023, Jideonwo was appointed as the board chair of The Initiative for Equal Rights (TIERs).

In 2024, He was appointed Creative-In-Residence at the London School of Economics.

== Early life ==
Jideonwo was born in Lagos to Ifeanyi S. Jideonwo and Ngozi A. Jideonwo. He had his primary and secondary education at K. Kotun Memorial Primary School, Adebola Baptist High School and Mayflower School, Ikenne respectively. He studied law at the University of Lagos where he was called to the Nigerian Bar in November 2007.

Jideonwo earned his Master's degree in media and communications from Pan-African University, Lagos.

== Career ==
=== TV ===
Jideonwo began his career as a TV presenter on NTA. He then worked as a researcher with Celebrating Jesus (MBI) and Inside Out with Agatha, a TV show with Agatha Amata syndicated across the country, where he met Adebola Williams, with whom he later co-founded Red Africa. He was also the associate producer of New Dawn, airing on the NTA Network. He has also appeared on The academy, Patito's Gang, Video 10, Big Brother Nigeria, MNet's Moments with Mo' and Rubbin' Minds talk show on Channels Television.

In 2004, While he was working at New Dawn with Funmi Iyanda, Jideonwo had a show on NTA network called Youth Talk in 2004 which led to the formation and registration of thRedSTRAT in 2005. His works has appeared on notable TV channels including Channels TV, Rave TV, Wazobia Max TV, GOtv, StarTimes and DStv. His show has featured Joke Silva, the wife of Olu Jacobs, Jim Iyke and Kemi Afolabi.

=== Print ===
In July 2009, Jideonwo joined the defunct NEXT Newspapers where he worked as an editorial board member and copy editor.

He ran a column, "Sons and Daughters", for three years in the Sunday edition of The Guardian profiling children of the rich and famous.

== Entrepreneurship ==
Jideonwo is the founder of Joy, Inc. and sits on the board of RED. He met Adebola Williams, co-founder of Red on the set of Inside Out with Agatha, with Agatha Amata, where he worked as a production assistant.

=== Joy Inc. ===
Joy Inc., a teaching and media company was registered as a benefit corporation.

=== Red (Red Africa) ===
RED's brands include The Future Awards Africa, Red Media Africa, StateCraft, Inc. and YNaija. It has partnered with Microsoft, Google, the British Council and the United States Government. Through Statecraft Inc, Red's governance communication company, Jideonwo led on the communication front for the Muhammadu Buhari campaign in 2015.

In 2016, StateCraft Inc. led the communication campaign for Nana Akufo-Addo in Ghana.

In 2025, he announced a launch of FourthMainland Funds, a $500,000 (approximately ₦1 billion) investment fund designed to act like a "record label" for African digital storytellers and content creators.

In 2026, Chude Jideonwo founded HBC Holdings, an African-first investment company focused on building influential media brands and businesses committed to telling transformative African stories to African audiences. The company makes strategic investments across content, communications, consulting, creators, data, and technology, with the aim of shaping the future of Africa's media and creative industries.

== Achievements and awards ==
In 2011, Jideonwo interviewed Goodluck Jonathan securing a sit-down with Nigerian president.

- 2012: Youngest member of the awards committee for the Ford Foundation Jubilee Transparency Award
- 2012: British Council's Steering Group for Creative Industries Expo.
- 2012: The Punch list of young people to watch in 2012.
- 2012: BusinessDay 40 under 40 list.
- 2013: Forbes 30 Under 30: Africa's Best Young Entrepreneurs.
- 2017: Greenberg Fellow at Yale University.
- 2018: Tutu Leadership Programme Fellow.
- 2020: 1 million Naira Prize for Difference and Diversity.
- 2022: Awaiting Trial nominated for the Africa International Film Festival.
- 2023: Awaiting Trial was nominated for the Best Documentary in Africa Magic Viewers Choice Award.
- 2023: Pulse Influencer Awards for the Podcast Influencer of the year.
- 2023: Chude was nominated as Most Popular Media Personality (Male) at NET Honours 2023.
- 2024: #WithChude Nominated for Podcast of the Year at the Africa Choice Awards 2024.
- 2024: 'Where is Chijioke?’ was selected for The Annual Film Mischief Festival 2024 (TAFM))
- 2024: "Is It Your Money?" won the Best Documentary award for The Best of Nollywood (BON) Awards
- 2024: "Where is Chijioke." was an official selection at the San Diego Film Festival
- 2025: WithChude was nominated as best podcast of the year with Trendupp Awards
- 2025: #WithChude Reign as Africa’s Most Watched Talk Show
- 2025: Chude Nominated for Media Visionary of the Year at MOI Awards 2025
- 2025: Chude Named Among NMC 100 at the 10th Anniversary of the New Media Conference
- 2026: Trailblazer award at the RealTalk With Kike's 7th Anniversary Celebration
- 2026: Winner Nigerian broadcaster merit award

== Films/ Documentaries ==
- Awaiting Trial (2022)
- Where is Chijioke? - 2024
- She stole our ovaries- 2024 (Director)
- TikTok Scammer- 2025 (Director)
- Is it Your Money- 2025 (Director)
- Reverend King: Nigeria’s deadliest cult leader| True crime special- 2025 (Director)
- SIN - 2025 (Cameo)
- Onobiren
- Madam President - 2026 (Executive Producer)

== Bibliography ==
- 2014: Are We The Turning Point Generation. (Farafina)
- 2001: His Father's Knickers.
- 2017: How to Win Elections in Africa: Parallels with Donald Trump, (Farafina)
- 2025: How Depression Saved My Life.
