= Gbenga Sesan =

Nigerian ICT entrepreneur (born 1977)

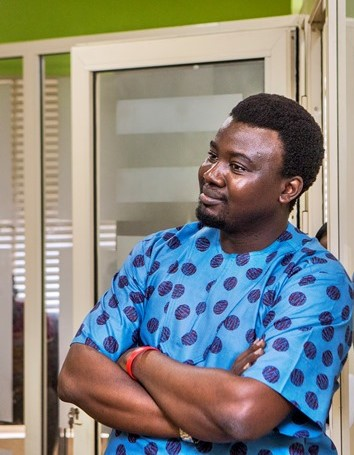
- Born: Oluwagbenga Olabisi Sesan; July 27, 1977 (age 49); Akure, Ondo State, Nigeria
- Other name: Olabisi
- Education: Obafemi Awolowo University
- Occupation: Social ICT entrepreneur
- Spouse: Temilade
- Awards: Under 40 Legends (2012) by Nigerian media Ventures Africa; 2014, the Schwab Foundation named him among the "Social Entrepreneur of the Year"

Oluwagbenga Olabisi Sesan (born 27 July 1977) is a Nigerian social entrepreneur known for his contributions to the field of ICT.

== Early life and education ==
Sesan was born on July 27, 1977 in Akure, Ondo, Nigeria. He graduated as an Electronic and Electrical Engineer at Obafemi Awolowo University in 2002. Sesan proceeded to Lagos Business School, where he studied at the Executive Education programs.

== Career ==
Sesan is a former member of the United Nations Committee of eLeaders on Youth and ICT. He is also a CyberStewards Fellow, Crans Montana Forum Fellow, Archbishop Desmond Tutu Leadership Fellow, 2007 Ashoka Fellow, Our Common Future and Cordes Fellow.

Sesan served as a member of the Presidential committees on Harmonization of Information Technology, Telecommunications and Broadcasting Sectors (2006), and Roadmap for the Achievement of Accelerated Universal Broadband Infrastructure and Services Provision (2013).

In 2016, Gbenga revealed that at the end of 2017, he would hand over his role as CEO to someone else to pursue policy.

In 2022, United Nations Secretary-General António Guterres appointed Gbenga to serve on his inaugural Internet Governance Forum (IGF) Leadership Panel.

== Publications ==
- Wh@t's Next? The Future of the Information Society — A Youth Perspective
- Sesan, 'Gbenga (2004). "African Youth in the Information Society". African Youth in the Information Society in Africa Networking: Development Information, ICTs and Governance. United Nations Economic Commission for Africa. pp. 125–139. ISBN 978-90-5727-052-9.
- Sesan, 'Gbenga (2005). Global Process, Local Reality: Nigerian Youth Lead Action in the Information Society. Paradigm Initiative Nigeria. ISBN 978-068-094-2. (presented at the World Summit on the Information Society in Tunis)
- Sesan, 'Gbenga (2006). "Telecentres in Nigeria". Telecenters in Nigeria. Nigerian Communications Commission/Growing Businesses Foundation/Club of Rome. pp. 263–272. ISBN 978-070-671-2.
- Sesan, 'Gbenga (2009). In My Own Words. Imprimata. ISBN 978-1-906192-33-4. (Autobiography)

Some of his published works includes:

- Sesan, 'Gbenga (2010). "Digital Lifestyle of Connected Nigerians". Anthology of Abstracts of the 3rd International Conference on ICT for Africa. International Center for IT and Development.
- Echoes From Ajegunle: Stories of Transformed Lives, From Small Steps to Giant Leap in Sesan, 'Gbenga (February 2010). "From Small Steps to Giant Leaps: Putting Research into Practice". Engineers Without Borders (UK) National Research Conference 2010 Journal: 106–108.
- ICTs for Development: A Social Entrepreneur's Perspective in Sesan, 'Gbenga (February 2009). "The Social Dimensions of Engineering Research". Engineers Without Borders (UK) National Research Conference 2009 Journal: 243–249.
- Sesan, 'Gbenga; Nwosu, U. (December 2007). "Ajegunle.org: Changing Ajegunle, 25 Youths at a time". Telecentre Magazine. 1. 1: 41–42.
- Social Enterprise in Africa: An Emerging Concept in an Emerging Economy in Sesan, 'Gbenga (October 2006). "Educational Research and Reviews". International NGO Journal. 1. 1: 4–8.

== Personal life and awards ==
Sesan resides in Lagos with his wife Temilade. For his contributions to ICT, he was recognised by CNN as "one of the 10 Leading African Tech Voices" on Twitter in 2012. That same year, he was one of 40 African Legends Under 40 list by Nigerian media Ventures Africa. In 2014, the Schwab Foundation named him.among the "Social Entrepreneur of the Year".
