= Iyasile Naa =

Digital painting by Ade Olufeko

- What Ever Is Destroyed Is Created Again
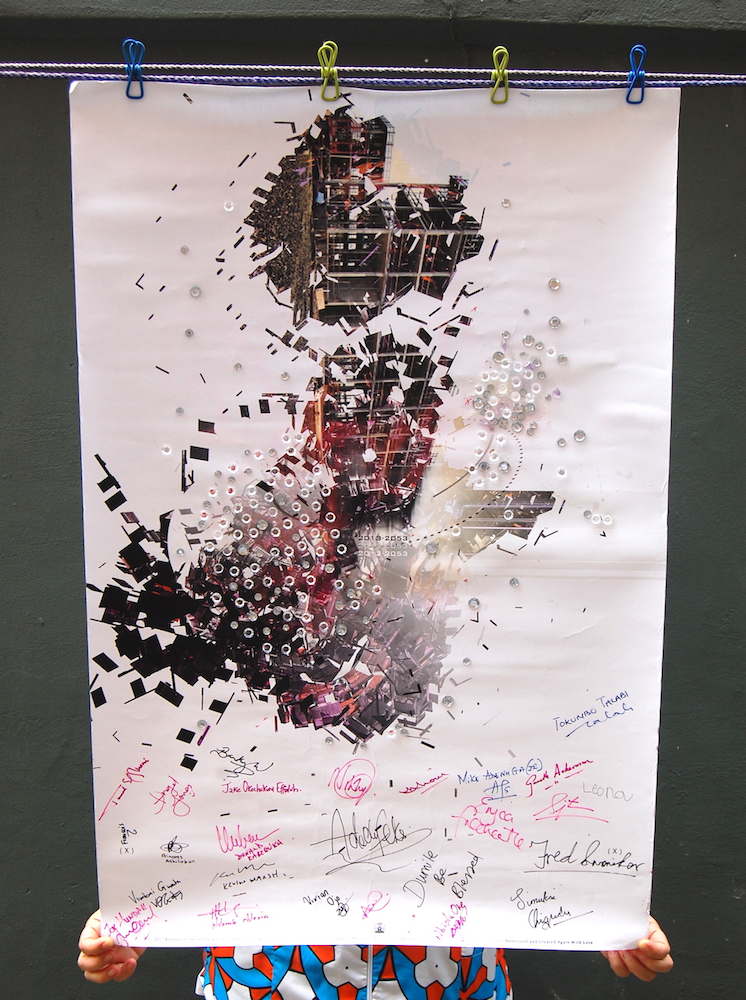
- Painting of the Legacy, 2017 version
- Artist: Ade Olufeko
- Year: 2013-2017
- Medium: Mixed media painting Giclée
- Movement: African Renaissance; Digital Art; Fractal art
- Subject: Emerging economies, Charity work
- Dimensions: 60 cm × 91 cm (24 in × 36 in)
- Designation: Berne Convention - for the Protection of Literary and Artistic Works
- Location: Lagos

The Iyasile Naa, also known as The legacy, is a digital painting created by Ade Olufeko, a designer known for his multidisciplinary work on African social economics. The original artwork was created in 2013. It underwent enhancements in Lagos and was reissued in 2017 as a major collaboration project piece through an African conference at Oxford University. According to the Vanguard news, parts of the artwork were influenced by 1985's We Are the World music project. Legal experts suggest that the eventual buyer of the artwork's reissue cannot financially exploit the work until the year 2033, stating that all "proceeds at any time from sales will remain within the African economic system."

== Background ==
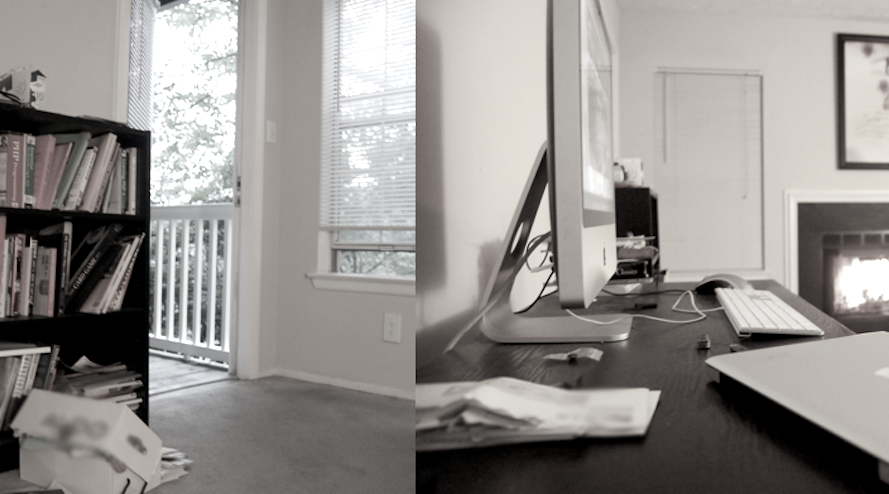
The legacy was designed at various locations, including Olufeko's mobile studio in Silver Spring, Maryland.

In the spring of 2013, Olufeko known for his cross-disciplinary signature through technology, created the artwork on the premise of social inclusion, brain gain and innovation. The art piece originally titled, Whatever is destroyed is created again, was made for and leveraged by an NGO, the United for Kids Foundation in Washington D.C.

Revealed for the first time at the Whittemore House making its debut to the public, it successfully raised money for children, and all proceeds were used to build libraries and classrooms in Lagos, Nigeria. The artwork surfaced at another fundraiser at the Civic Center in Lagos, drawing affluent patrons of the arts, doubling donations of its previous auction.

The conception of the finished piece is suggested to be forecast of the continent's economic growth.

== Design ==
The artwork is described as a visual albedo, it incorporates and is classified as; mixed media, digital abstracts and painted work. Portions of the piece were created via a graphics tablet on an iMac, and printed to heavy coated paper. It is sprinkled with crushed amethyst clusters, acrylic diamond confetti and inscribed with permanent markers. The year 2053 appears in the center of the work allowing interpretations of trajectories to theorists. As part of the reissue, signatures and enhanced artistic deformations were added for Art valuation.

== Reissue and Sungbo's Eredo ==
In spring 2017, Olufeko attended and spoke at the Blavatnik School of Government's Breaking the Frame[works] conference alongside other thought leaders, discussing the "changing state of the African continent", on the topics of media, technology and governance. Prior to the conference, Olufeko collaborated with the conference team at Oxford to reissue the painting, "Philosophers’ Legacy ". The new version and charity experiment was created in stealth mode. The piece was completed in October 2017, making its debut inside Sungbo's Eredo, an African monument. The release coincided with the 10th anniversary marking of Visual Collaborative.

== Name change and blockchain ==
In early 2022, It was announced by The Guardian (Nigeria) news that the artwork had been renamed from Philosophers Legacy to Iyasile Naa which means "the legacy" in the Yoruba language. This was done to protect intellectual property and alleviate conflicts during the rapid use of NFTs non-fungible tokens on the Blockchain. The changes aim to be a direct benefit for aspiring digital painters and enthusiasts.

== Reception ==
According to Road to Africa, the artwork's place in the Fourth Industrial Revolution can be leveraged to aid ongoing brain-gain initiatives to steer NGOs, the private sector and friends of the continent which includes its diasporas into a self-reliant, yet an interdependent partner of the world economy. A derivative work named Remember To Rise was created a year later.

=== Autographs ===
The following is a list of persons at and outside the oxford conference who signed the artwork.

- Mike Adenuga Jr. GCON, CSG, CLH – Business magnate
- Tokunbo Talabi – Businessman, politician
- Fred Swaniker – Leadership development expert

=== Support signatures ===
- Dr. Yene Assegid – Leadership coach
- Donald Kaberuka – Economist
- Seko Shamte – Tanzanian filmmaker
- Nawal M. Nour – African women's health practitioner
- Eryca Freemantle – Global beauty ambassador
- Banky Wellington – Nigerian singer and media mogul
- Jake Okechukwu Effoduh – Activist and lawyer
- Vivian Ojo – Conference chair
- François-Xavier Ada – Researcher
- Angel Jones – Brain gain advocate
- Ademola Adesina – renewable energy investor
- Simukai Chigudu – Medical doctor
- Vimbai Gwata – technologist
- Kevin Marsh – Oxford professor
- Gareth Ackerman – Businessman

=== Other signatures ===
- Leona Hauldren – Preschooler (Outreach)

== See also ==
- Remember To Rise
- African Renaissance
- Sungbo's Eredo
