= Biola Alabi =

Nigerian businesswoman

- Citizenship: Nigerian
- Education: University of Cincinnati (Public and Community Health), Harvard University's Kennedy School of Government, Yale University's Jackson Institute of Global Affairs
- Occupations: Businesswoman, entrepreneur, angel investor
- Organization(s): Biola Alabi Media (BAM), Unilever Nigeria PLC, Monty Mobile, Big Cabal Media
- Known for: Media production, leadership development, angel investing
- Awards: 20 Youngest Power Women in Africa (Forbes, 2012), World Economic Forum Young Global Leader (2012), CNBC Africa's AABLA West African Business Woman of the Year (2013)

Biola Alabi is a Nigerian businesswoman and the CEO of Biola Alabi Media (BAM).. She previously served as Managing Director for M-Net Africa part of the globally renowned Naspers Group, where she launched seven Africa Magic channels including the indigenous language channels; Africa Magic Yoruba and Hausa. She also developed the Africa Magic Viewers’ Choice Awards which is regarded as the “African Oscars”.

Biola Alabi is an angel investor and advisor in African technology and media startup ecosystem. She is a limited partner in numerous funds, and has invested in companies like Trove Technologies, and Chekkit. She is a Non-Executive Director at Unilever Nigeria PLC, a member of the board of directors at Monty Mobile, and the Chairwoman of Big Cabal Media.

== Early life and education ==
Biola was born in the US to Nigerian parents. The eldest among four children of Yoruba origin, her father is from Akure in Ondo State, while her mother is from Ilesa, a town in Osun State. Alabi attended University of Cincinnati where she graduated with a degree in Public and Community Health, she furthered her education with a program at Harvard University's Kennedy School of Government and Yale University's Jackson Institute of Global Affairs.

== Career ==
Alabi founded Grooming for Greatness, a leadership development and mentorship program for a new generation for African leaders. Alabi held the position of Managing Director for M-Net Africa, part of the Naspers Group. Prior to this, she was based in the United States where she was part of the executive team at the influential children's television brand Sesame Street, and a member of the marketing team that launched the Korean motor vehicle corporation Daewoo in the USA. In 2018, Alabi took part initialing massive collaboration art piece Remember To Rise.

=== Corporate Boards ===
- Unilever Nigeria PLC, Non-Executive Director
- Monty Mobile, Member of the Board of Directors
- Big Cabal Media, Chairwoman

== Biola Alabi Media (BAM) ==
Biola Alabi Media (BAM) which began in 2015 is a production company that provides services to broadcasting stations, digital industries and entertainment distribution platforms. BAM tells African stories to the world. Its first TV show, Bukas and Joint was widely received. It was rated the most watched TV food show across the country.

== Filmography ==
- Banana Island Ghost (2017) as The Executive Producer
- Lara and the Beat (2018) as The Executive Producer

== Awards and recognition ==
- 2012 – 20 Youngest Power Women in Africa by Forbes Magazine
- 2012 – World Economic Forum Young Global Leader
- 2013 – CNBC Africa's AABLA West African Business Woman of the Year
- 2014 – Yale World Fellows Recipient (Named 1 of 16)
- 2018 – Financial Times top 100 global female executive

== See also ==
- List of Nigerian film producers
