= Adebola Williams =

Nigerian writer (born 1986)

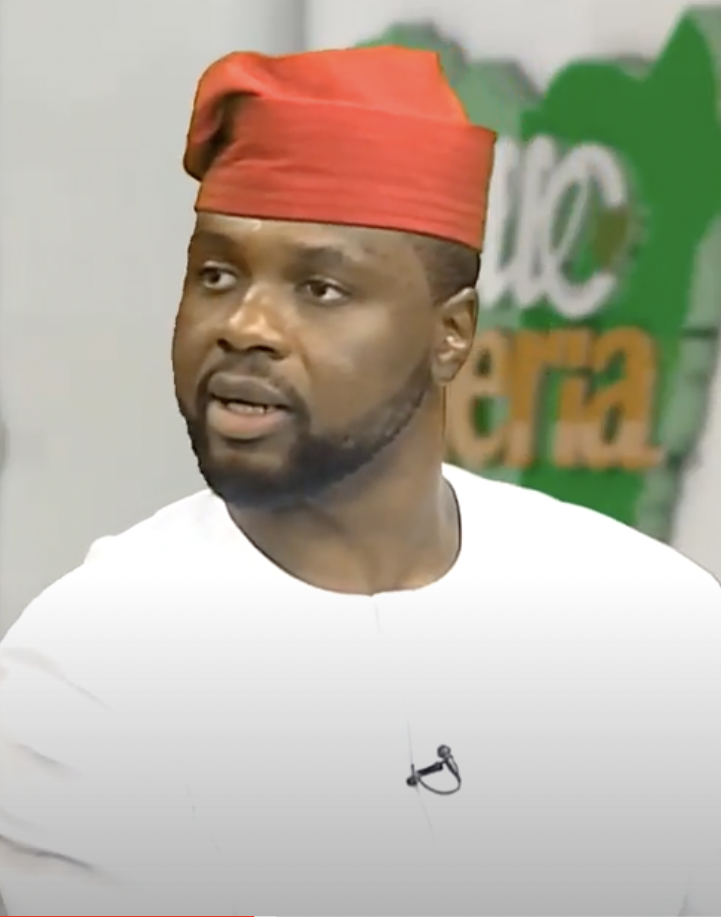
- Born: 7 March 1986 (age 40); Nigeria
- Education: London School of Journalism, Pan African University
- Occupation: Journalist/media entrepreneur
- Writing career
- Notable awards: Mandela Washington Fellow; 100 Most Influential People of African Descent under the United Nations International Decade for People of African Descent; Archbishop Desmond Tutu Fellowship in South Africa

Adebola Williams (born 7 March 1986) is a Nigerian media entrepreneur, journalist, political consultant, and motivational speaker. He was the Group CEO of RED | For Africa. He passed the leadership baton to Ayodeji Razaq in 2022. He co-founded and ran Red Africa, Africa's largest portfolio of youth media brands which include Red Media Africa, Statecraft Inc., The Future Awards Africa, and YNaija.

His career in media and television began at the Nigerian Television Authority (NTA) with advocacy for youth, and, eventually good governance. Described as "the man with the golden touch" by Ghanaian President Nana Akufo-Addo, he was profiled by Forbes as the man who helped elect a trifecta of presidents in Africa.

== Early life ==
Williams was born on 7 March 1986 "to a wealthy family, but when he was 10, his family lost everything they had, so he had to struggle." In his early teen years, Williams wanted to become an actor and was paid only 50 cents for his first acting role.

"He started working as an assistant with a counselor and a psychologist as a freelancer without any relevant qualification by which time he had chalked up 3 years worthy experience with the Nigerian Television Authority (NTA)."

== Career ==
Williams and Chude Jideonwo started The Future Awards Africa, and went on to co-found Red Media Africa.

He co-founded EnoughisEnough (EiE), a Nigerian civic participation platform and a voice for young people in politics. He resigned as the board chairman to steer the rebranding of the former Nigerian president, Muhammadu Buhari, optimising media engagement to change longstanding perceptions and sway the elections. A consequent success in Ghana helped the opposition candidate win the presidency on his third attempt, and Williams currently consults in other regions in the continent.

His 2017 cross-continental speaking tour included several conferences at ivy league schools: Harvard, Columbia, and Oxford. He gave a speech at the 2017 Obama summit in Chicago.

His work in corporate marketing and communication in different decrypts from oil and gas to banking, technology to fast-moving consumer goods has earned him and Red Media Africa several awards on the continent from SABRE Lapriga, Marketing Edge, Young Cannes and the C4F Marketing awards in Davos. He writes a monthly column on brands and communication in The Guardian (Nigeria). Williams took part initialing massive collaboration art piece Remember To Rise.

He gave a speech at the European Conservatives and Reformists (ECR) Africa Summit on Wednesday, 9 January 2019, at the European Parliament on democracy and good governance.

== Recognition ==
- Mandela Washington Fellowship, Young African Leaders Initiative, a fellowship to study in the United States for six weeks
- 2014: Co-winner with Chude Jideonwo, Young Business Leader of the Year, West Africa, CNBC Africa All Africa Business Leaders Awards 2014
- 2017: Named The African Young Achiever by EMY Ghana
- 2017: Named one of the 100 Most Influential People of African Descent under the United Nations International Decade for People of African Descent
- 2018: Archbishop Desmond Tutu Fellowship in South Africa

== Personal life ==
He married Kehinde Daniels, the daughter of former Ogun State Governor Otunba Gbenga Daniels, on 7 August 2021.
