= University of Abuja =

Federal University in Abuja, Nigeria

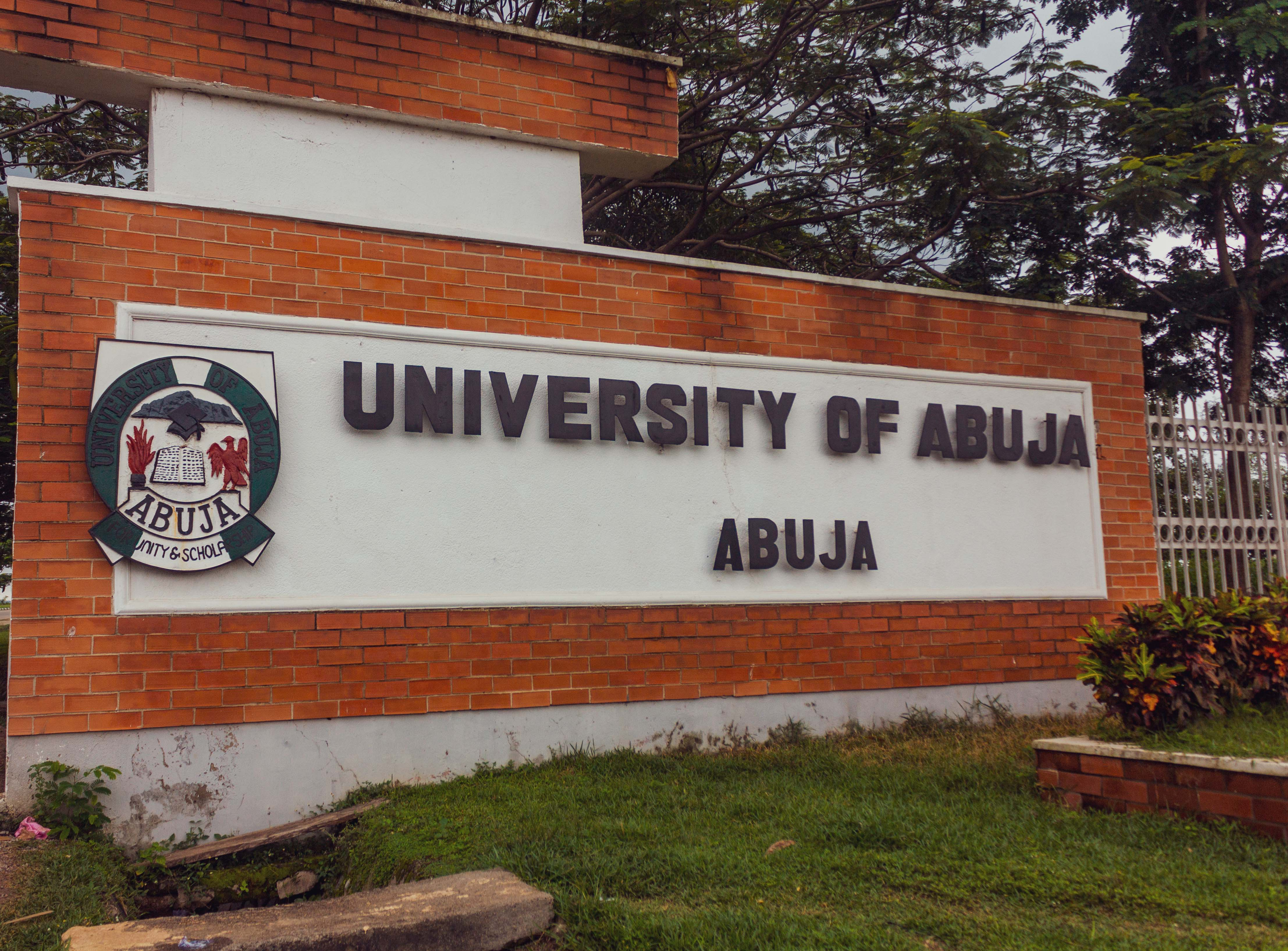
- Other names: UofA, UNIABUJA.
- Motto: For Unity and Scholarship.
- Type: Public
- Established: 1 January 1988; 38 years ago
- Affiliations: NUC, ASUU, NASU
- Religious affiliation: Nonsectarian
- Vice-Chancellor: Prof. Hakeem Babatunde Fawehinmi
- Faculty: 17 faculties
- Students: 55,364
- Location: Abuja, Nigeria; 8.979°N 7.179°E
- Campus: 11,800 hectares (29,000 acres); Rural
- Colors: Green; White
- Website: uniabuja.edu.ng

The University of Abuja or Yakubu Gowon University is a federal university located in Abuja, Nigeria. It was established in January 1988 (under Decree No. 110 of 1992 as amended) as a dual-mode university with the mandate to run conventional and distance learning programmes. Academic work began at the university in 1990 with the matriculation of its pioneer students.

It was later renamed by President Bola Ahmed Tinubu to "Yakubu Gowon University" on 16 December 2024, in honor of General Yakubu Gowon, a former head of state and president of Nigeria on his 90th birthday, "for his exceptional contribution to Nigeria's unity and his commitment to the country's progress".

== History ==
The university took off from a temporary site made up of three blocks of buildings meant for a primary school in Gwagwalada and tagged the "mini-campus." Academic activities started on the mini-campus in 1990, after which the university was allocated an expanse of land covering over 11,800 hectares (29,000 acres) along the Abuja City Airport Road for the development of its permanent campus.

Relocation to the permanent site has been ongoing to date. The campus now hosts three female and two male hostels housing thousands of students. However, the distance learning offices of the university are located within the Abuja municipality (Area 3 Garki) where contact sessions of the programme are also held.

== Library ==
The University Library was established in 1988 to support teaching, learning and research to meet the objectives of the University of Abuja with information resources online and offline. The University main library is located on the main Campus along Airport Road, Abuja.

== Academics ==
The University offers diploma, undergraduate and post-graduate degree programmes as well as a Centre for Distance Learning School which provides university education to those who cannot acquire such education through the regular university system and those interested in acquiring new knowledge and specialised skills.

A list of faculties and colleges currently at the University of Abuja include:

- Faculty of Agriculture
- Faculty of Art
- Faculty of Education
- Faculty of Engineering
- Faculty of Environmental Sciences
- Faculty of Law
- Faculty of Management Sciences
- Faculty of Sciences
- Faculty of Social Sciences
- Faculty of Veterinary Medicine
- School of Post Graduate Studies
- School of Remedial Studies
- College of Health Sciences
- College of Medicine
- Faculty of Pharmaceutical Sciences
- Faculty of Nursing and Allied Health Sciences
- Faculty of Media and Communication Studies
- The Institute of Legislative Education

The university had plans to commence the Geology and Mining program in the 2023/2024 academic session.

== Council and Administration ==
The key organs and officers involved in the administration and governance of the university are the Governing Council, the Senate, the Congregation and the Convocation, the Vice-Chancellor, two Deputy Vice Chancellors (Administration and Academic), the Registrar and Secretary to Council, the Bursar, the University Librarian, Deans of Faculties, Directors of Centres and Institutes and Heads of Department. All these organs and officials are supported by the Committee system which is the pivot of administration of the university.

=== The Governing Council ===
The Council consists of the chairman who is also the Pro-Chancellor of the university, the Vice Chancellors (Administration and Academic) a representative of the Federal Ministry of Education, four persons appointed by the National Council of Ministers representing broad national interests, four persons appointed by the Senate from its members, one persons each appointed by the Congregation and the Convocation among their members and the Registrar as Secretary to Council. The council is the highest policy-making organ of the university.

=== The Senate ===
The Senate is the highest University authority on academic matters. It is the general function of the Senate to organise and control teaching at the university and the admission and discipline of students, as well as the promotion of research. The Senate comprises the Vice-Chancellor as chairman, the Deputy Vice-Chancellors, the Professors, the University Librarian, Deans, Directors and Deputy Deans, Heads of Academic Departments, one member of academic staff representing each Faculty and the Registrar as Secretary.

=== The Congregation ===
The Congregation is made up of all members of staff of the university who were university graduates by appointment. The Vice-Chancellor is its chairman and the Registrar is the Secretary. Congregation meetings, being statutory, are called to afford members opportunities to have a say in matters affecting their welfare.

The university runs a consultancy services sub-degree program and an institute of education to cater for the professional needs of teachers and specialised needs of government education bodies; it provides avenues for the establishment of linkages on education matters with organisations and institutions within and outside Nigeria.

The university during its 96th regular meeting in May 2023 promoted 19 of its academic staff to professorial rank. 8 were promoted to the rank of professor, while 11 were promoted to the rank of associate professor.

During the 96th Regular meeting, the Governing Council of the University of Abuja approved the appointment of the youngest professor of law in Nigeria and the first female professor of law from Northwest Nigeria, Aisha Sani Maikudi, alongside Professor Philip Afaha as Deputy Vice Chancellors Academic and Administrative respectively.

== Gallery ==
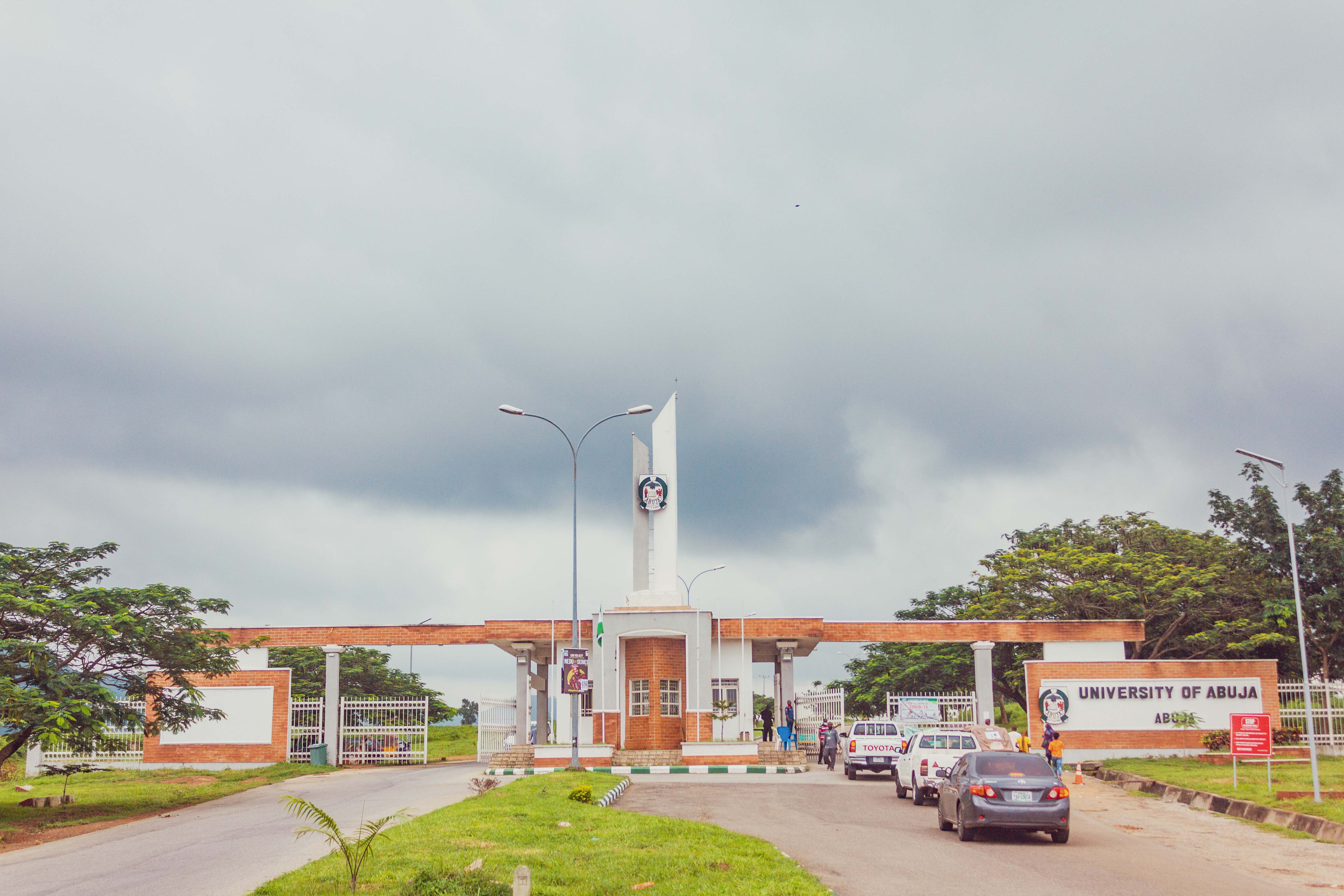
The main gate entrance of The University of Abuja Nigeria

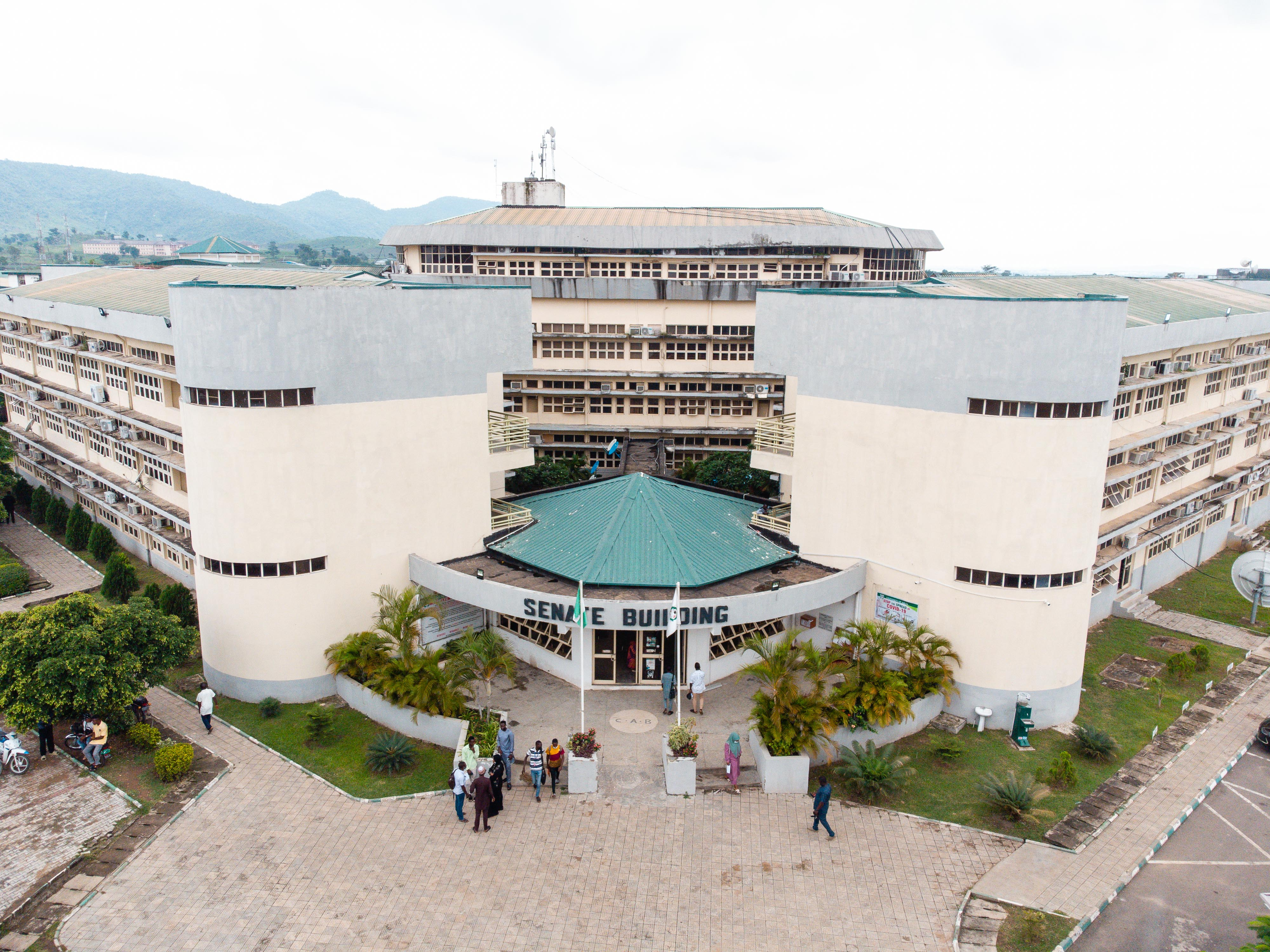
Senate and Admin Building

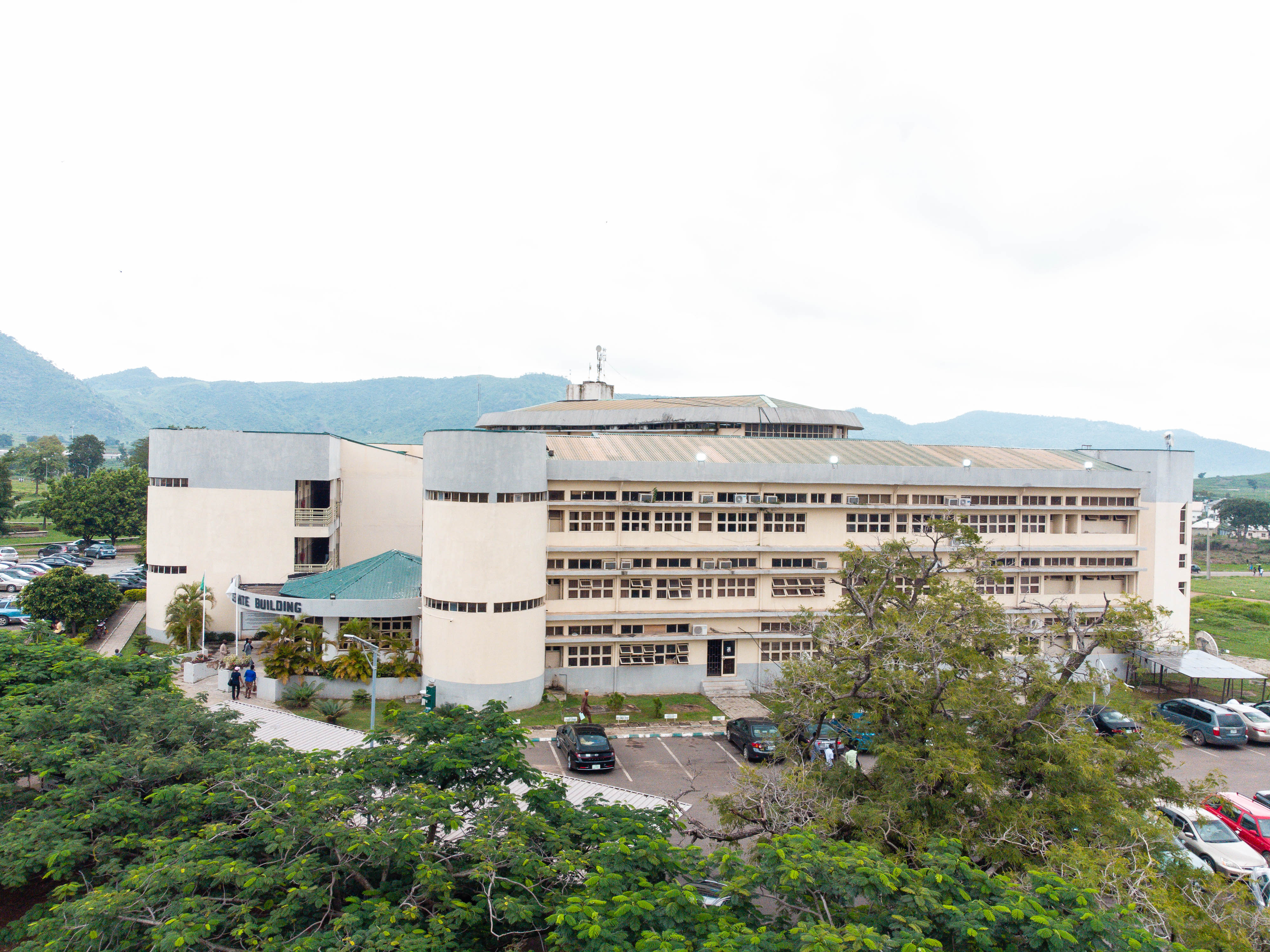
Side view of Senate Building

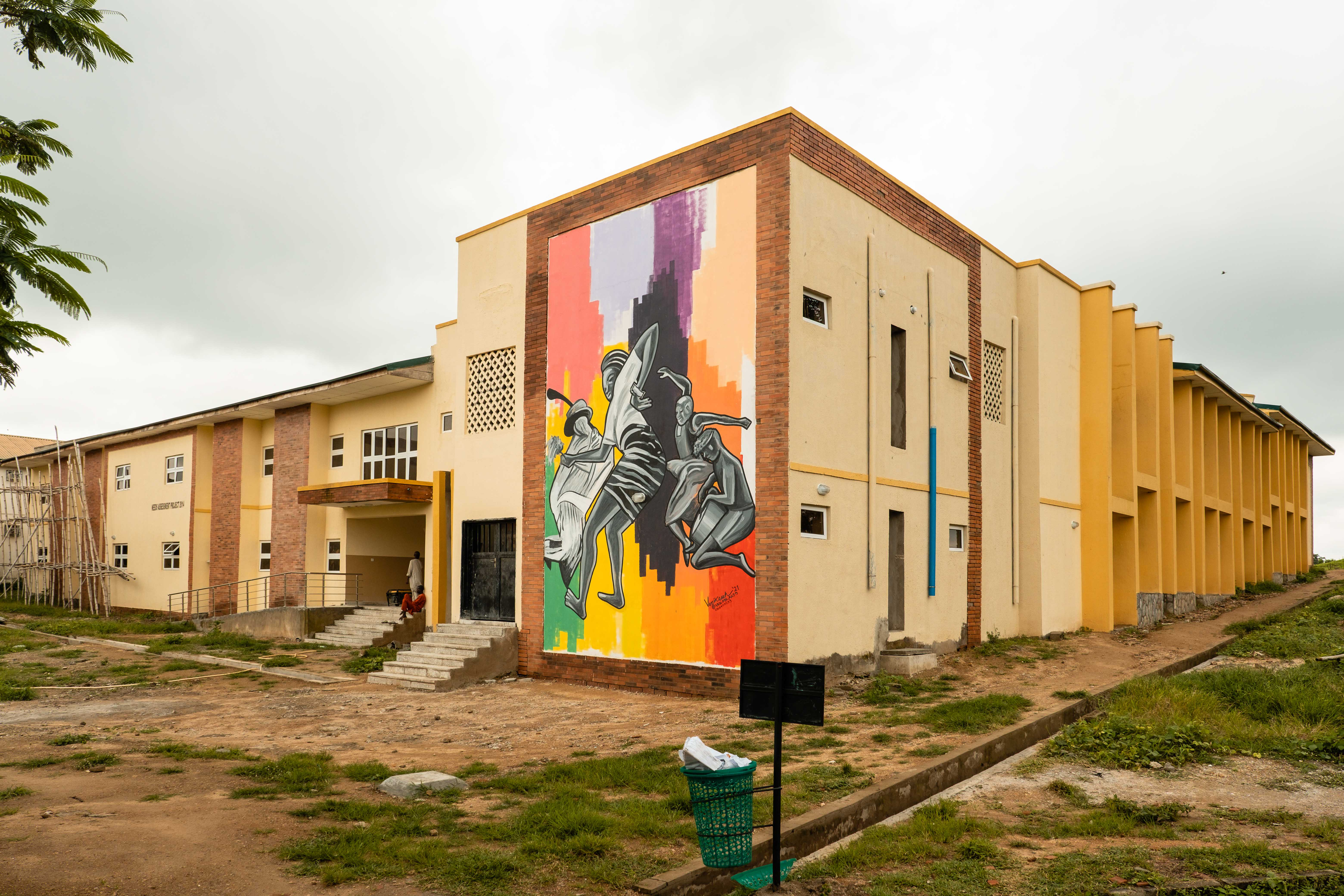
Faculty of Arts

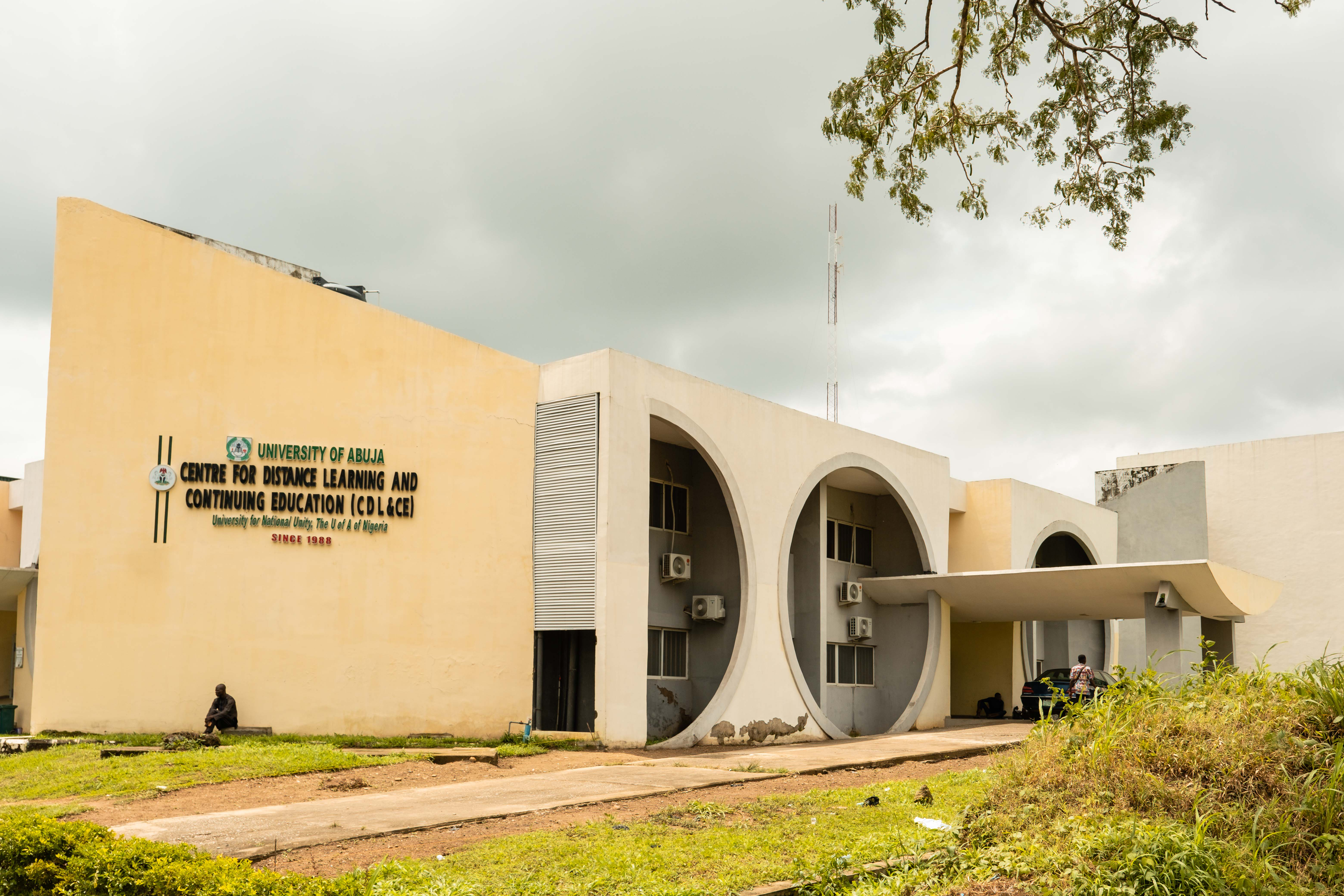
Centre for Distance Learning

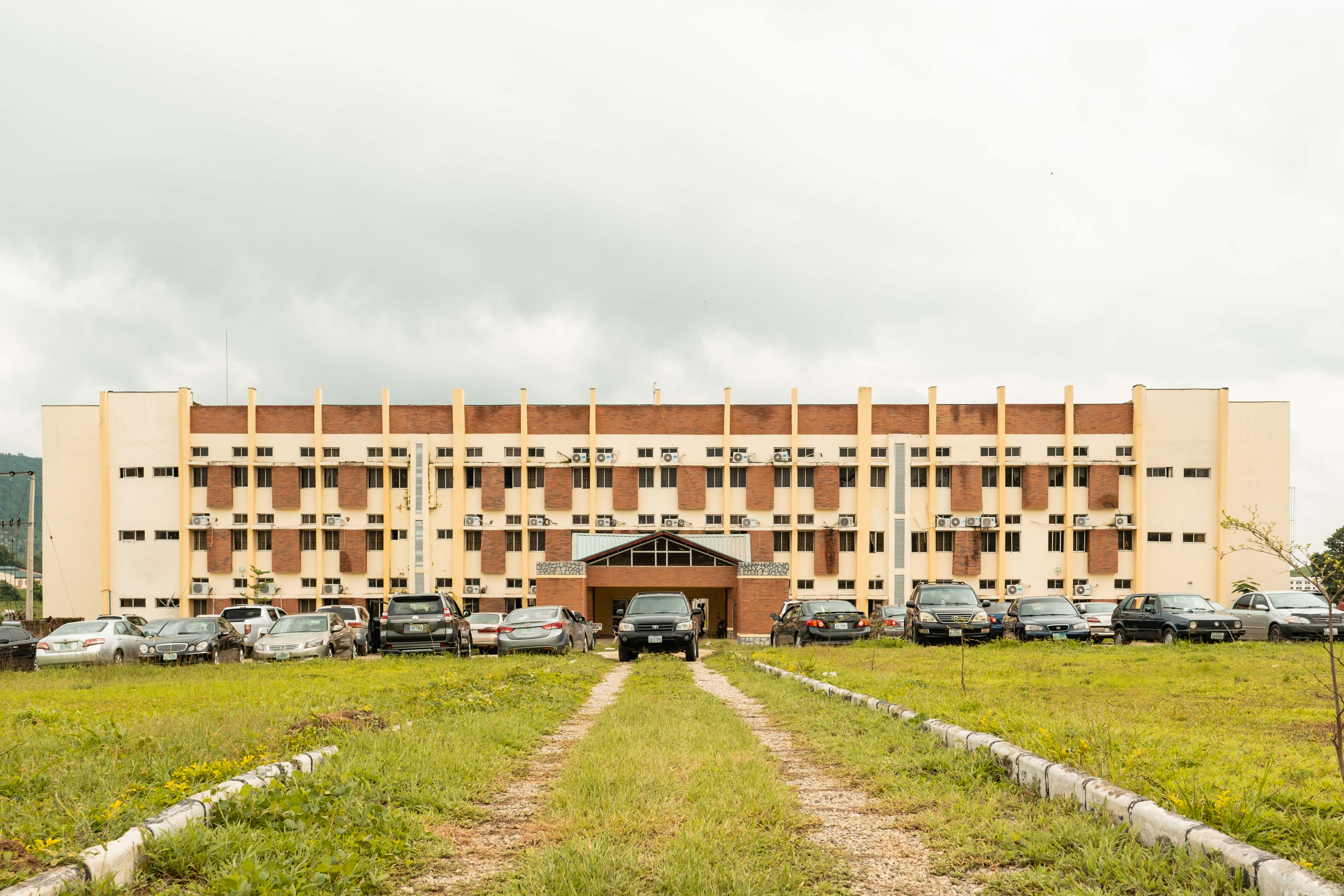
Faculty of Management sciences

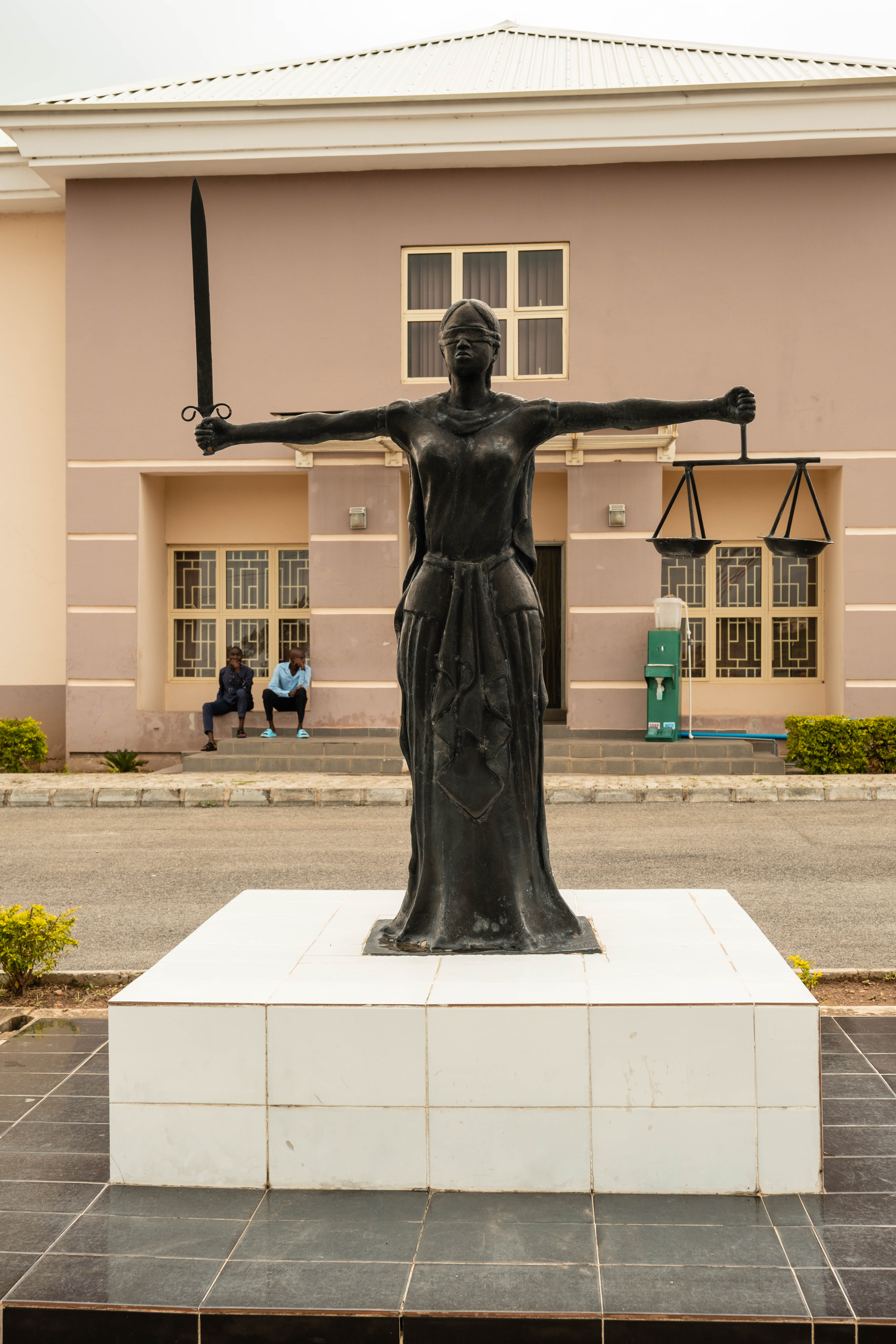
The Lady justice at Law faculty

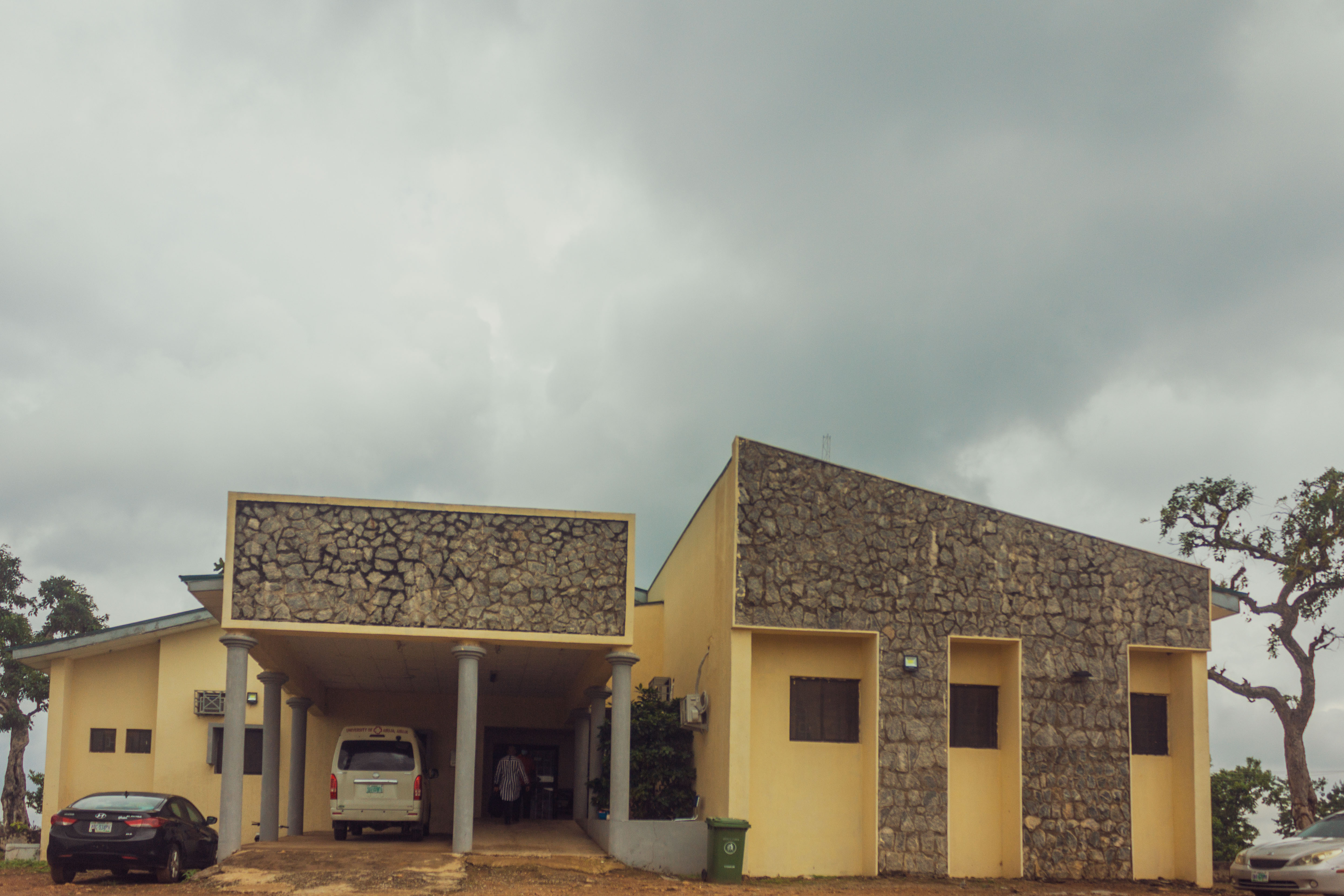
University Clinic

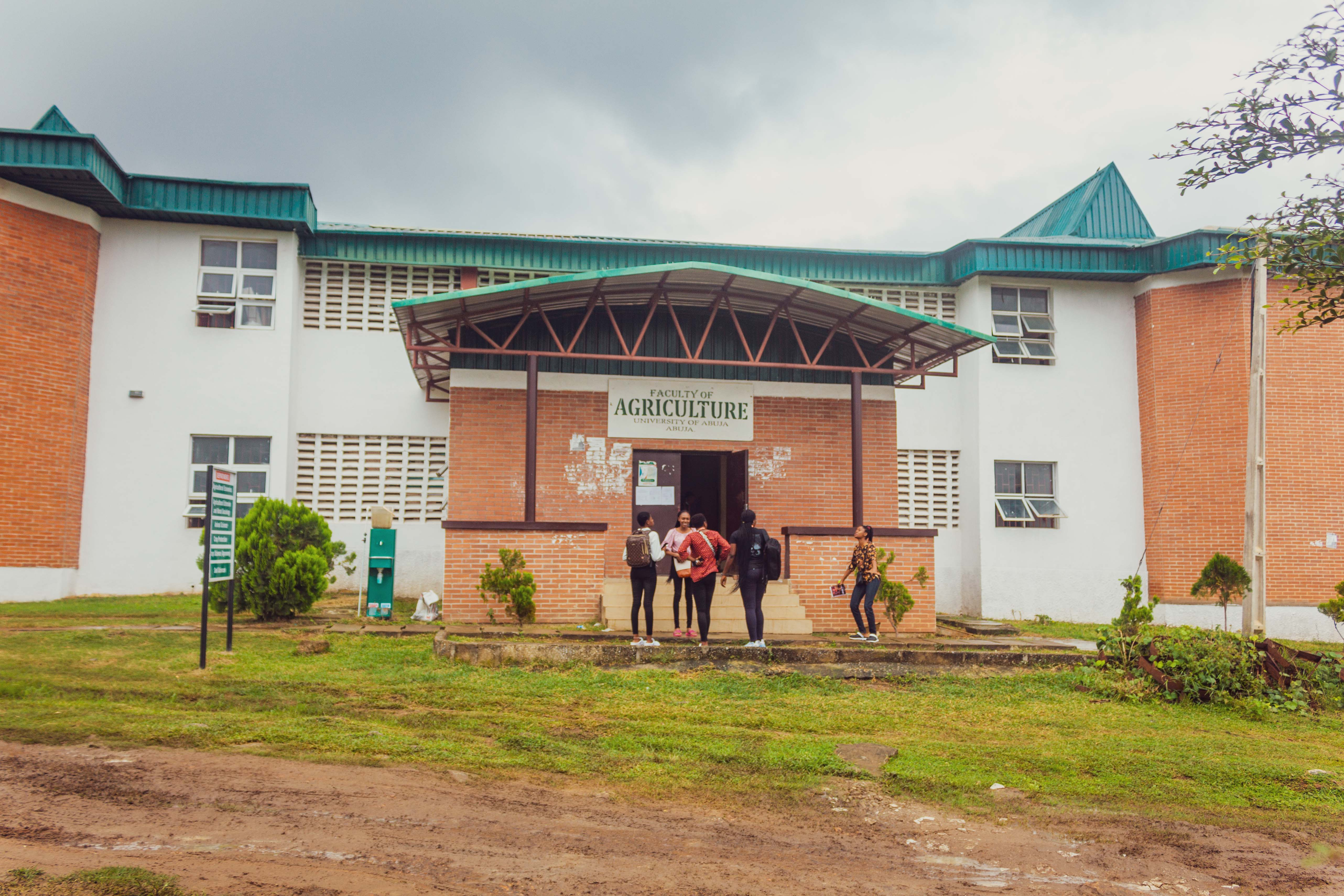
Faculty of Agriculture

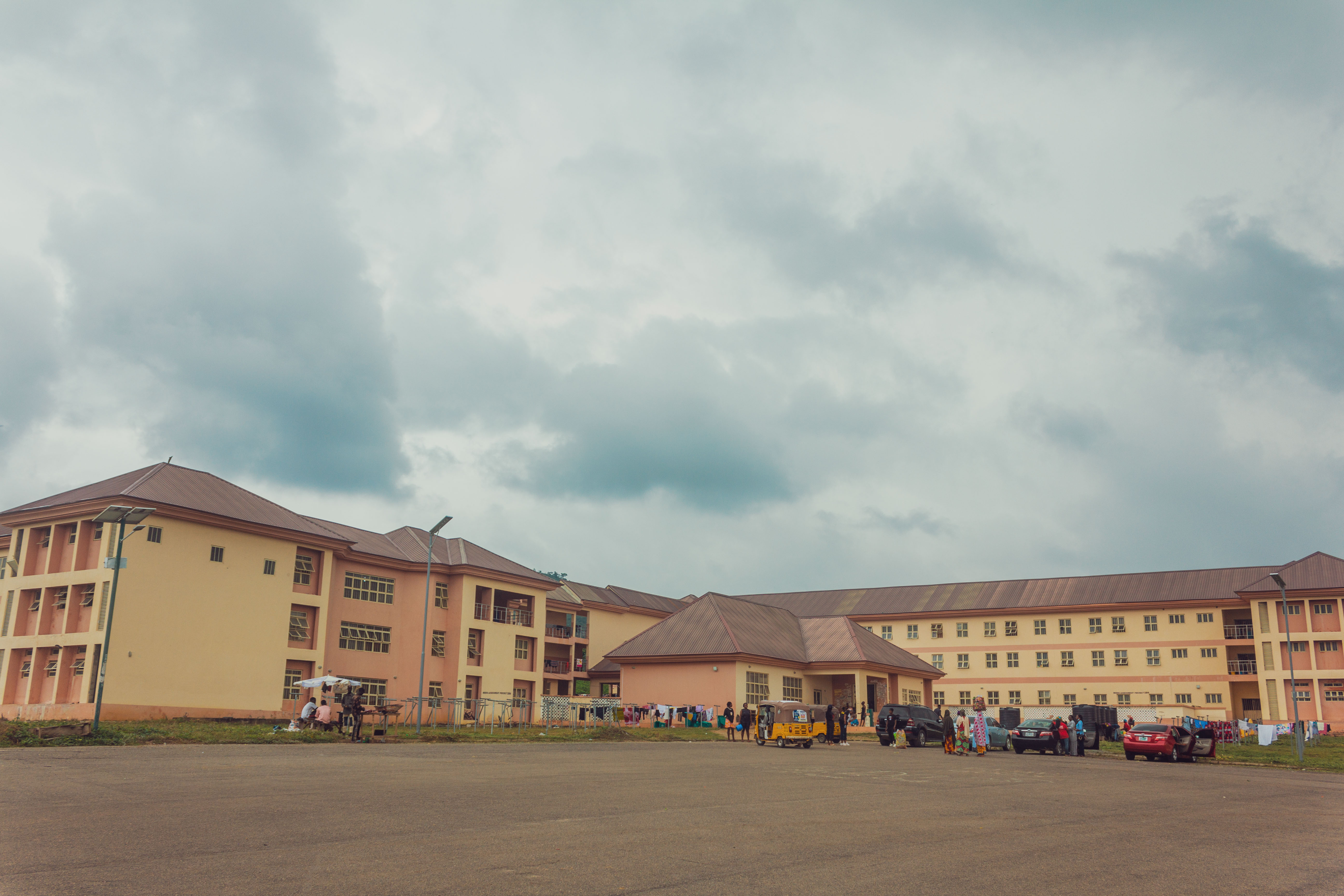
The new female Hostel

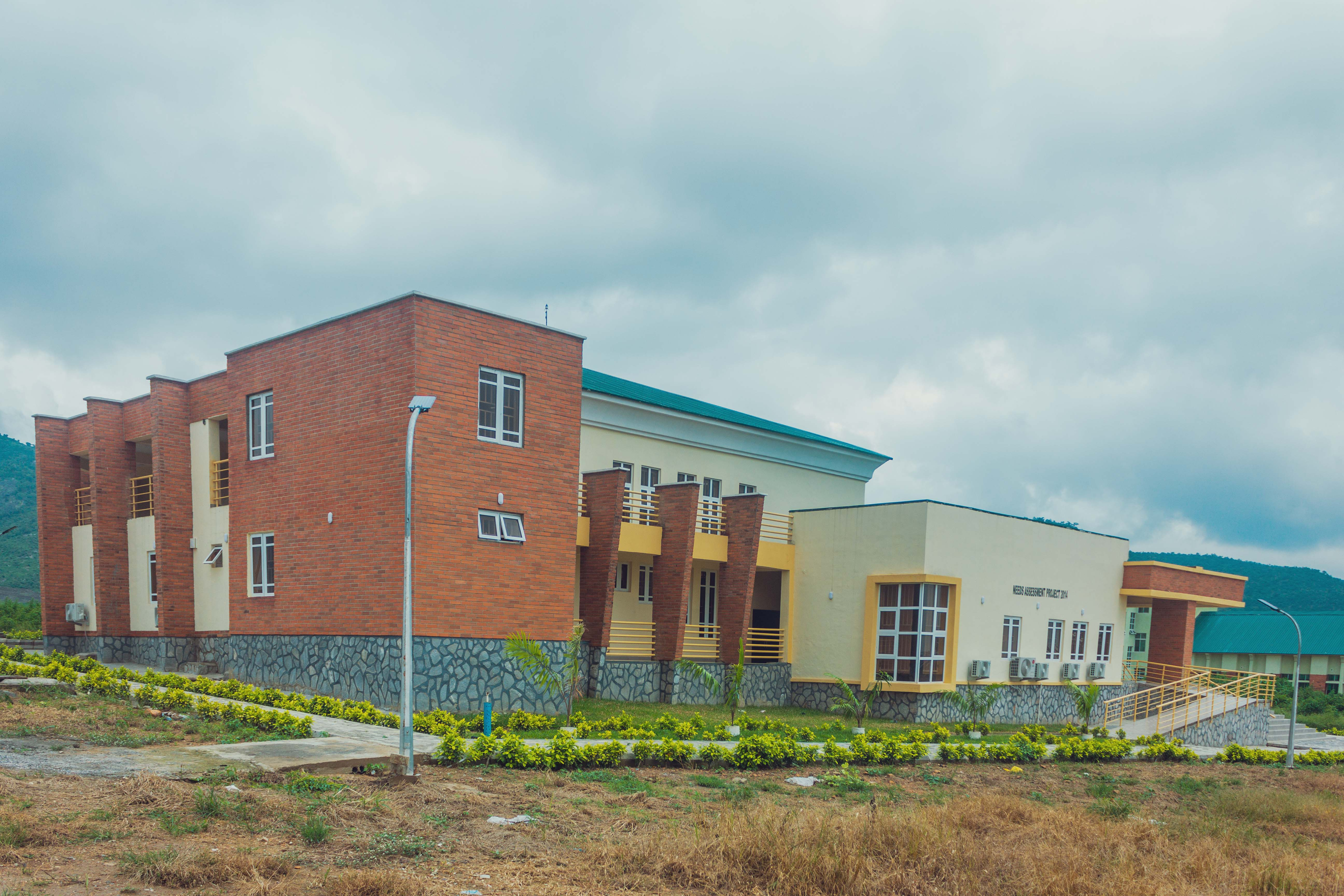
Faculty of Social Sciences at University of Abuja, Abuja, Nigeria

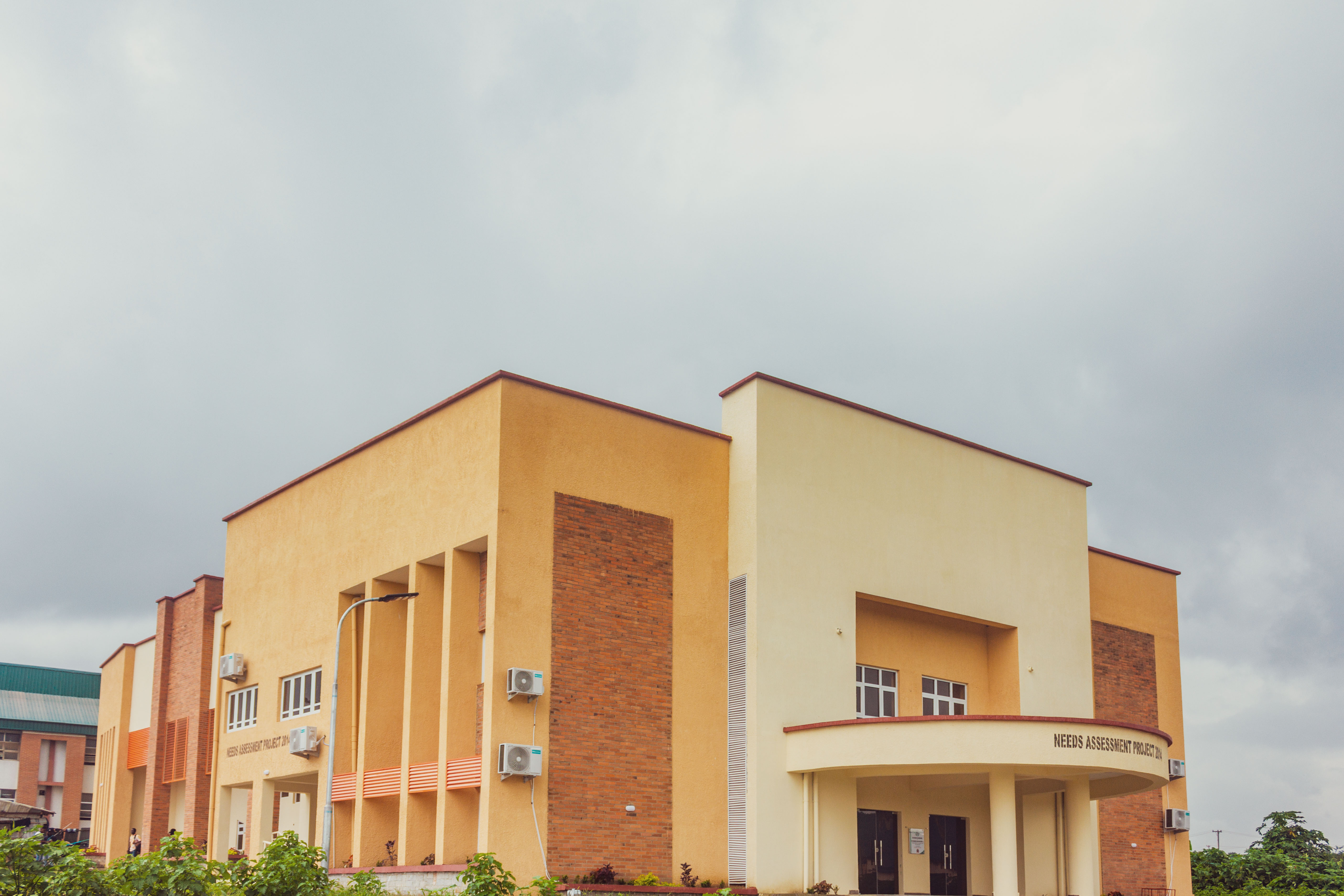
Faculty of Agriculture Lecture theatre

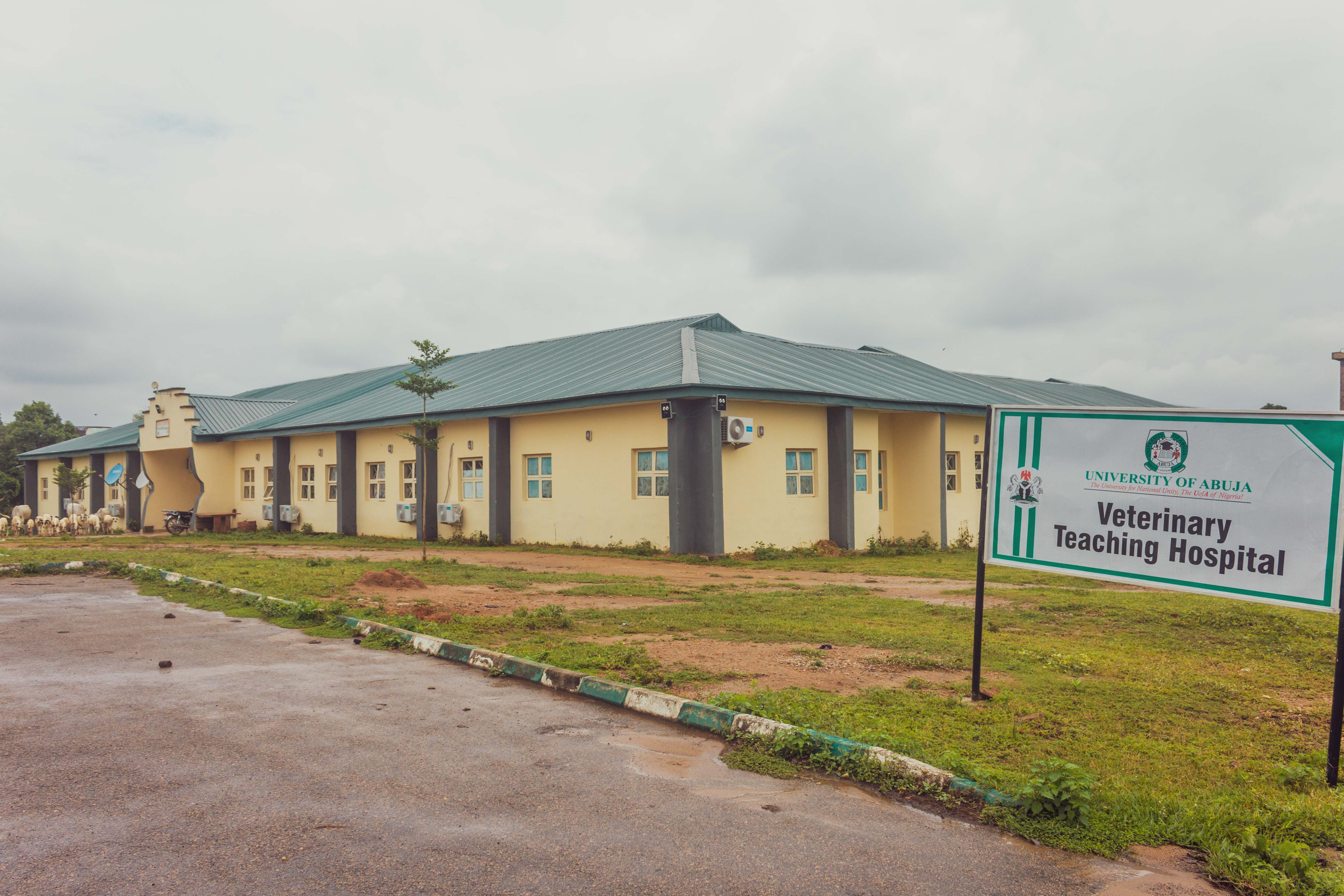
Veterinary Teaching Hospital

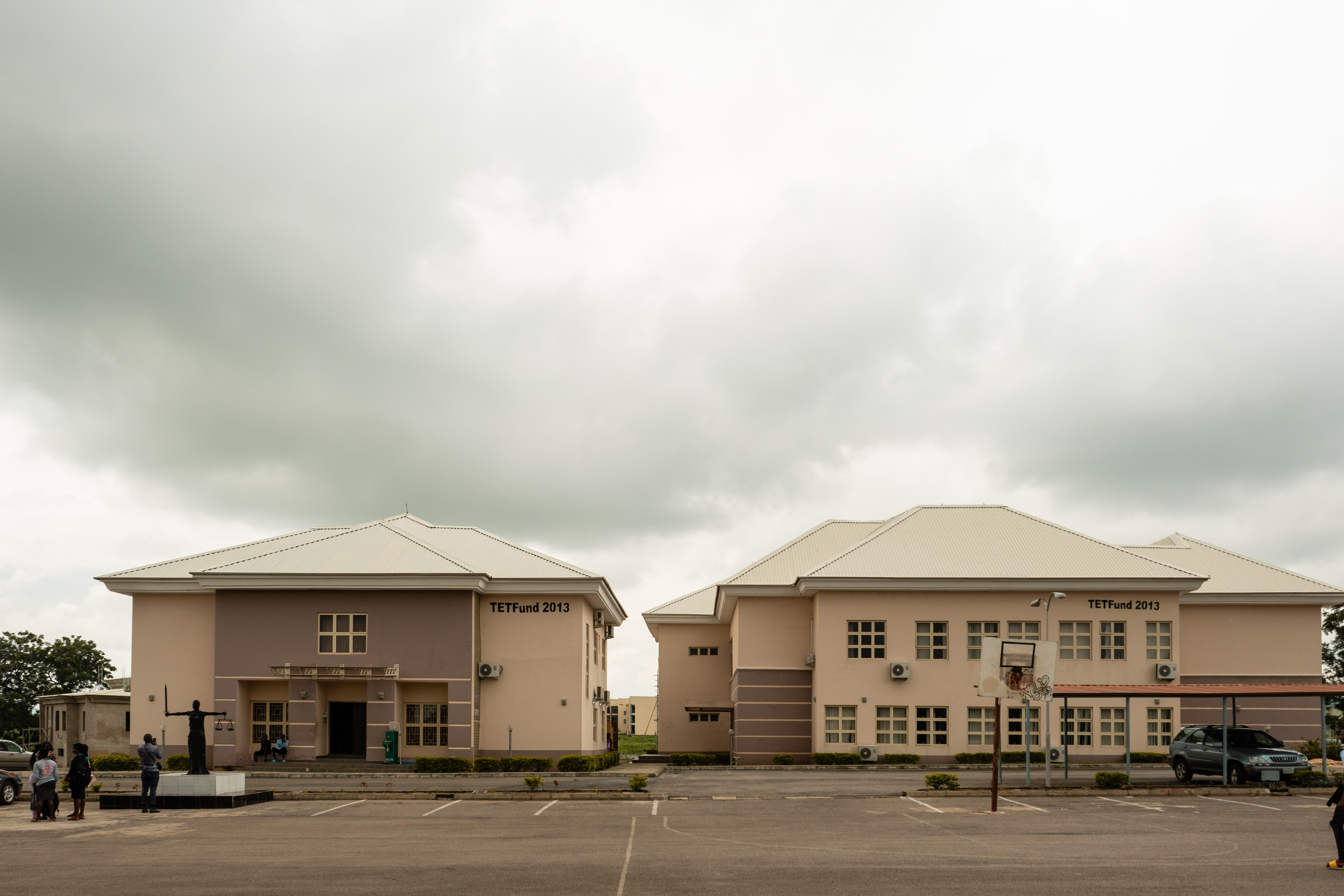
Faculty of Law

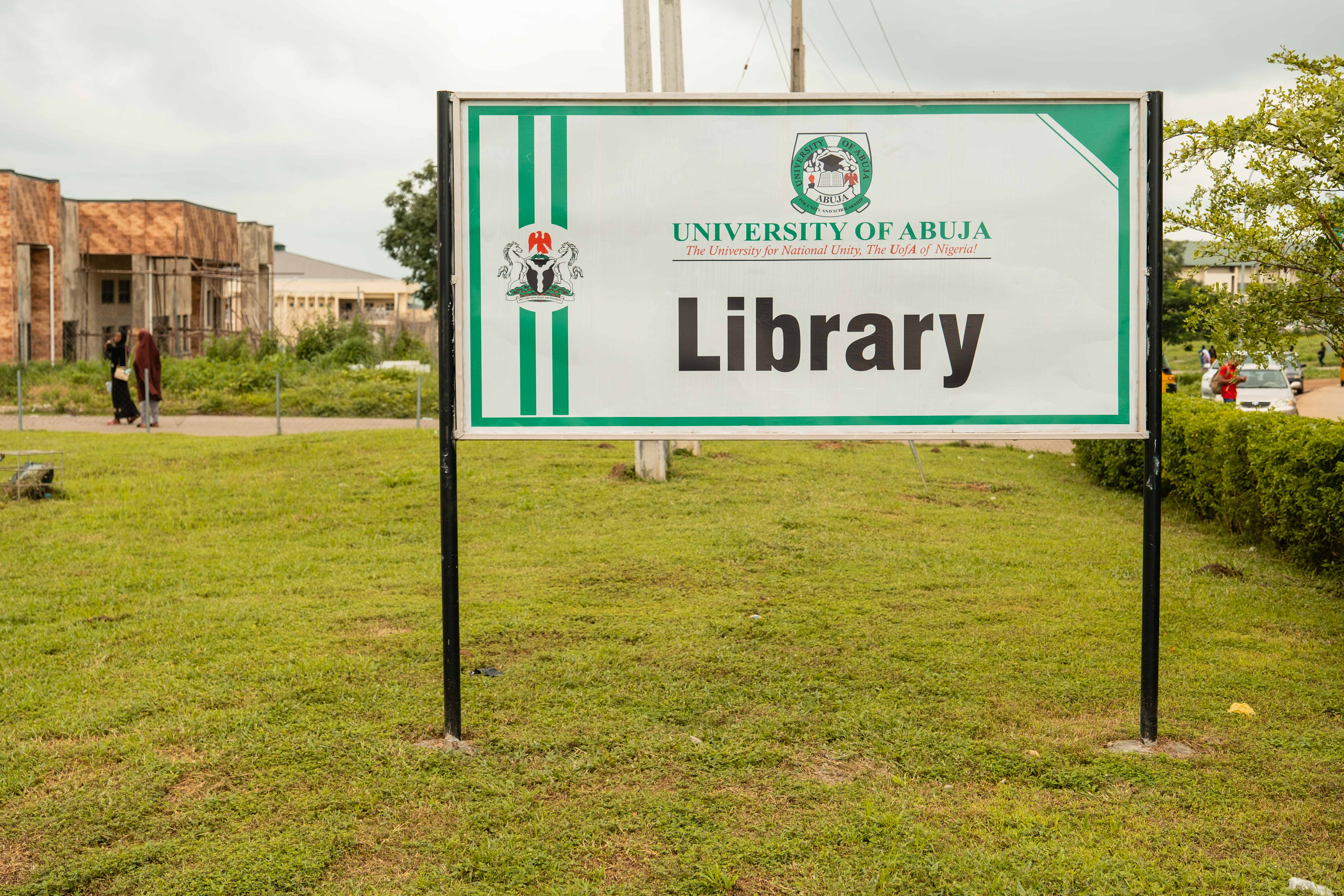
Library sign

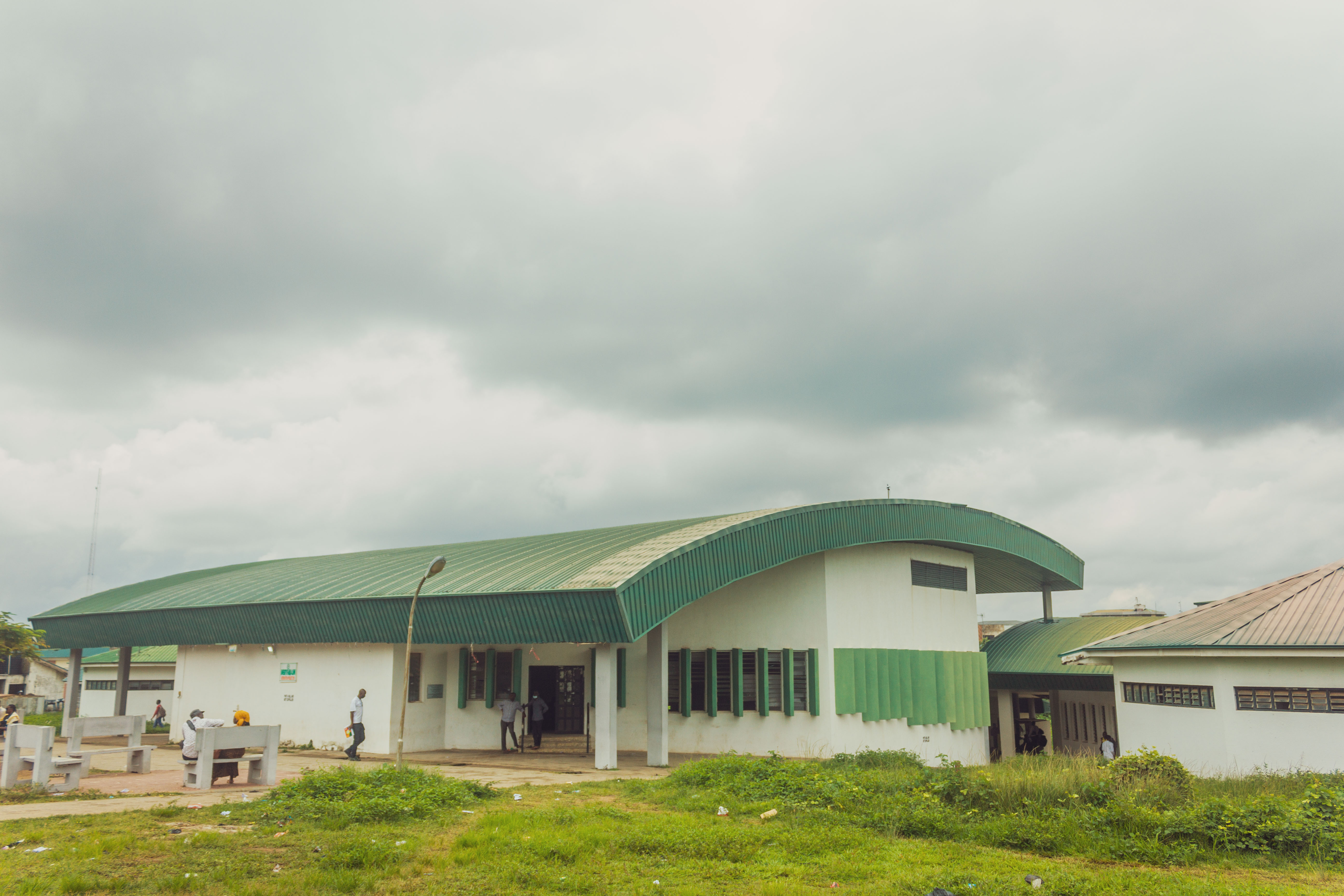
ETF main hall

== Notable alumni ==
- Aishah Ahmad, former deputy governor Central Bank of Nigeria.
- Chuks Anyaduba - lawyer, filmmaker and humanitarian
- Jake Okechukwu Effoduh - radio personality, human rights activist and lawyer
- Olumide Idowu - youth campaigner and climate change activist
- JaySynths – record producer
- Kanayo O. Kanayo - actor, film maker and lawyer
- Ebuka Obi-Uchendu - Lawyer, media personality
- P-Square, Afrobeat duo
- Imaan Sulaiman-Ibrahim – director-general of NAPTIP
- Uba Sani, Current governor of Kaduna State
- Yakubu Dadu, Nigerian diplomat and Consul General at the Consulate General of Nigeria, Frankfurt, Germany.
- Yonov Frederick Agah, Nigerian diplomat and former deputy director-general of the World Trade Organization.

== See also ==
- Education in Nigeria
- List of universities in Nigeria
