= Ade A. Olufeko =

Nigerian-American technologist, designer, and entrepreneur

Ade Olufeko
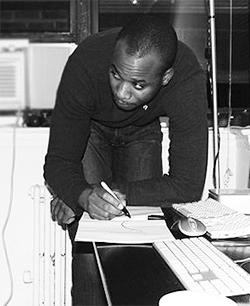
- Olufeko in New York City, 2008
- Born: 1980 (age 45–46); Minneapolis, Minnesota, U.S.
- Other name: Adéolu
- Education: St. Gregory's College
- Occupations: Technologist; designer; entrepreneur
- Known for: Founding of Visual Collaborative, Founder of Wing Chun Foundation Lagos
- Notable work: North Star (2019); Remember To Rise (2018); Iyasile Naa (2017)

Fu Qingyun (Note: Chinese name bestowed within Wudang martial arts context.)
- Traditional Chinese: 傅青雲
- Simplified Chinese: 傅青云
- Literal meaning: Fu Qingyun
Transcriptions
Standard Mandarin
- Hanyu Pinyin: Fù Qīngyún

Ade Abayomi Olufeko (Note: Simply known as Adé, Pronounced /ɑːˈdeɪ/; ah-DAY Yoruba: Adé Olúfẹ́kọ́ pronounced [a.dé o.lú.fɛ́.kɔ́].) (born 1980) is a Nigerian-American technologist, designer, and entrepreneur. He is the founder of Visual Collaborative, an international platform for interdisciplinary projects in culture, innovation, and the humanities.

== Early life and education ==
Ade Olufeko was born in Minneapolis, Minnesota, and spent his formative years in Lagos, Nigeria, living in Surulere during the country’s Second Republic. He attended Unilag Staff School for primary education and St. Gregory's College in Obalende for secondary school.

In the mid-1990s, he returned to Minneapolis, where he attended Camden and gave guest lectures to International Baccalaureate peers on cultural perspectives in English literature. He later enrolled at Metropolitan State University in Saint Paul, where he studied computer science with a focus on multimedia technologies.

== Career ==
=== Technology and advisory ===
Olufeko began his career in 1997 with a law internship at Hinshaw & Culbertson, where he assisted with digital integration for legal archiving. During the dot-com period, he transitioned into technology, working in interactive design, internet technologies, and hardware at companies including Ameritech, Imation, and IBM.

While based in Minneapolis in the early to mid-2000s, he worked with musicians in New York City, including Amel Larrieux and Ladybug Mecca, on web design and digital strategy projects. He later relocated to New York City and joined Warner Music Group, where he contributed to its digital properties.

Between 2004 and 2007, Olufeko worked in quality assurance at Shavlik Technologies and Adobe Systems, focusing on software testing and product stability. In 2007, he founded Visual Collaborative, a platform for artists and creatives that featured over 150 participants over a decade. In 2016, he returned to IBM as a management consultant, working on technology-driven initiatives.

After relocating to Lagos, Nigeria, Olufeko worked in the creative and technology sectors. Prior to settling in Lagos, he undertook consulting projects in Lagos and Abuja. He later served as a management consultant for The Avenue Projects.

From 2021 to 2023, he served as the first chairman of the Creative and Entertainment Group within the Lagos Chamber of Commerce and Industry, where he advocated for policies supporting SMEs and creative enterprises, particularly in intellectual property. He is described as an advocate for decentralized technologies in Africa’s creative economy.

Olufeko has delivered talks at institutions including the University of Oxford, Yale University, and Harvard Business School on topics related to innovation, digital transformation, and Africa’s economy.

He has also served as a guest moderator at London Business School and Columbia University, and has spoken at institutions including Georgetown University, Carnegie Mellon University, and the Lagos Business School on topics related to technology, creativity, and economic development.

== Humanities ==
=== Art and design ===
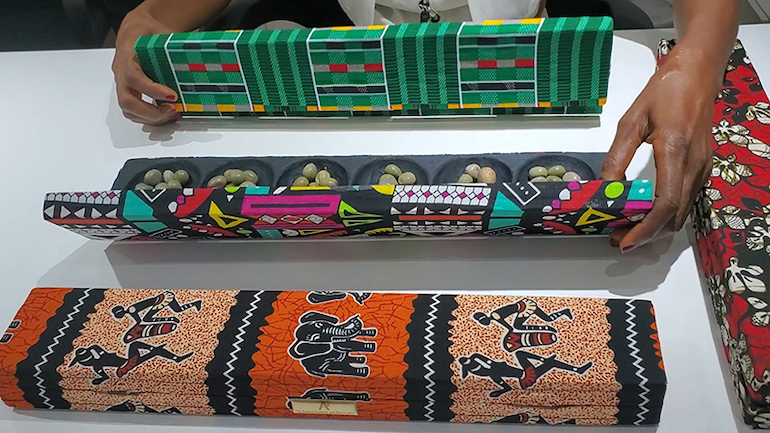
Wax print styled AYO Mancala, designed by Ade Olufeko

Self-taught as a digital painter and in mixed-media artistry, Olufeko's creative process as an avocation evolved over a decade. His exhibited work explores Africanfuturism and contemporary culture.

In 2021, he introduced a wax print version of the indigenous Ayo mancala in Ankara fabric, initially producing 200 units for the consumer market. He later expanded the product line with Kente and Adire variants distributed across West Africa and its diaspora. According to audited data, sales of locally made units exceeded 5,000.During a period of capital flight in Nigeria and a fire outbreak in one of the largest woodcraft communities, part of these proceeds supported artisans and their families.

"Technological power without wisdom or cultural grounding produces sophisticated illusions, not genuine progress."

— Olufeko, discussing knowledge transfer across generations. The Guardian

His artwork Remember To Rise, a collaboration with London Business School, and Iyasile Naa, a project with Oxford University, reflect his integration of technology and cultural narratives into visual storytelling. In 2017, Ade Olufeko led a multidisciplinary project documenting Nigeria's Sungbo's Eredo earthworks. The team employed blockchain technology for metadata preservation alongside geospatial mapping and local oral history collection.

Selected exhibitions include:

- 2008: Undercurrent Arts, Wynwood Art District, (Miami, Florida)
- 2011: Queens Gambit, Dual popups in Forest Hills and Fresh Meadows, (New York, New York)
- 2013: United for Kids Foundation. Whittemore House (Washington D.C.)
- 2013: United for Kids Foundation, Passion Ball, Civic Center, (Lagos, Nigeria)
- 2013: Brave is Beautiful. Hudson Terrace (New York, New York) (Note: On January 17, 2013, Olufeko’s digital paintings were featured at a fundraiser held at Hudson Terrace in New York City, where Somaly Mam was the guest of honor. The event supported the Somaly Mam Foundation.)
- 2014: 16th African Business Conference. Harvard Business School (Boston, Massachusetts)

=== Literary works ===
As part of the North Star Electronic Catalogue for Visual Collaborative, Olufeko authored Voyager (Vol. 2), Vivencias (Vol. 3), and Supernova (Vol. 4) in 2019, followed by TwentyEightyFour (Vol. 5) in 2020. During the same period, he wrote The Enterprising Young African: Avoiding Pitfalls in Technology and Business (2019), which examines challenges in Africa’s evolving digital and business landscape.

== Martial arts ==
Olufeko has trained in several martial arts disciplines, including Wing Chun, Wudang Kung fu, Aikido, Iaido, and boxing, with instruction received in the United States, China, Japan, and Indonesia. He trained in Ving Tsun within the Moy Yat lineage of the Ip Man system in New York City under Sifu William Moy. During his martial arts training at Luofu Mountain, he was given the Chinese name Fu Qingyun by Shifu Wang Shizhi, a 15th-generation inheritor of the Wudang Sanfeng sect.

In 2024, he established the Wing Chun Foundation Lagos, an organization focused on the practice and study of Wing Chun in Lagos, Nigeria, applying its principles to leadership development.
