= Remember To Rise =

2018 derivative artwork by Ade Olufeko

- Black's Dream
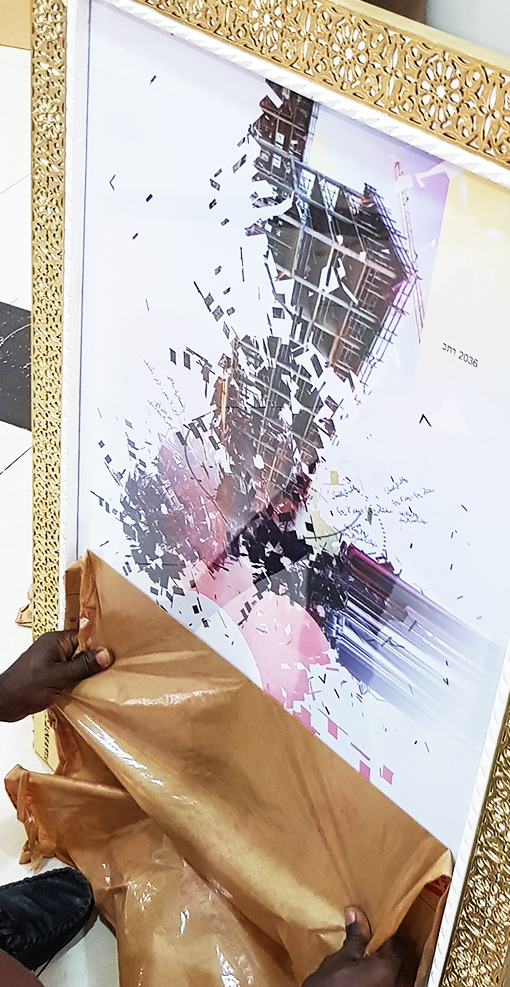
- Remember To Rise artwork unveiled (2018)
- Artist: Ade Olufeko
- Year: 2018
- Medium: Mixed media on coated paper
- Movement: Pan African, Afrofuturism
- Subject: Modern Second Scramble For Africa
- Dimensions: 60 cm × 91 cm (24 in × 36 in)
- Location: Lagos

Remember To Rise (Arabic: كن يقضا أحلام سوداء) subtitled "Black's Dream" is a derivative work of the Iyasile Naa, a massive art collaboration. Observing innovation in developing countries, technologist of Ijebu descent Ade Abayomi Olufeko, known for his collective signature created the work as a cultural bequest for the African continent.

Described as a polymath by Vanguard for his international work, Olufeko teamed up with the African business club at the London Business School, during its summit which held at the Landmark hotel, he introduced the digital painting parallel to his attendance and guest moderation of a social cultural panel that featured high-profile personalities.

== Background ==
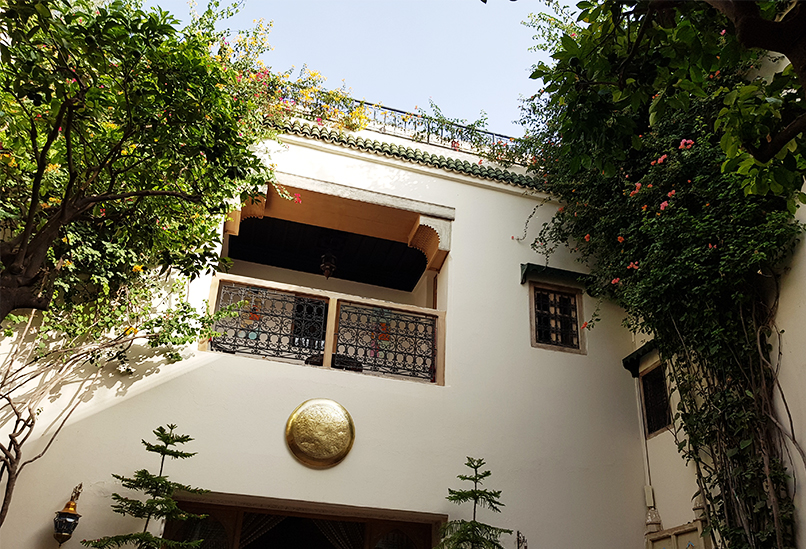
Olufeko added Zellige designs into artwork casing at this riad in the Bab Doukkala district, Marrakesh, Morocco.

The art piece evolved as an expression and active statement to the intellectual elite, in context of highlighting economic bubbles, fragmentation, and ethnocentrism towards the continent from its diaspora. Remember To Rise serves as a nonpolitical symbol and a call to action towards the youth, encouraging the expansion beyond the rapid dominance of general pop culture and African music on the world stage. The collaboration between Olufeko and the club at the business school leveraged the attendance of renowned public figures by their respective fields.

== Artwork, title and construction ==
In context of economic cause and effect, observing the activities of several industries on the Intra-trade in Africa, the title of Remembering To Rise; Black's Dream came to fruition. The artwork is an abstract painting that shows researched data guided by geometric shapes, and displays arabic calligraphy excerpts by the famous poet Rumi. It also displays permanent markers, scattered citrine clusters with acrylic powder glitter on heavy-coated paper, making the classification of the artwork mixed media.

Showcasing the breath of African culture, the framing of the artwork in Zellige motifs is accompanied with Amazigh and Berber languages. Adding to the practice of inclusion across the sub-Sahara, the final assembling was done in the Ojuelegba community. The abstract aspects of Remember To Rise is inspired by astronomical star Eta Carinae.

== Notable signatures ==
The following is a list of persons at and outside the summit who signed the artwork as of 2018.

- Seun Kuti, Nigerian musician
- Ozwald Boateng, British fashion designer
- Sola David-Borha, financial executive
- Karim Sy, Senegalese businessman
- Amy Jadesimi, businesswoman
- Didi Akinyelure, journalist
- Rikki Stein, media executive
- Biola Alabi, media entrepreneur
- Adebola Williams, media entrepreneur and journalist
- Franklin Amoo, investment executive
- Alexander Amosu, luxury designer
- Tara Fela-Durotoye, Nigerian makeup artist
- Mostafa Terrab, Moroccan engineer
- Michael Ugwu, British music industry executive
- Kanya King, founder of MOBO Awards
- Bronwyn Nielsen, editor-in-chief in CNBC Africa
- George Asamani, entrepreneur
- Oyinda Emelia Olufeko, businesswoman
- Niyi Richard Michael, entrepreneur
- Sade Michael, legal entrepreneur
- Neanda Salvaterra, journalist
- Jido Akran, preschooler

== Personnel ==
Various persons part of the Remember To Rise project.

=== London Business School ===
- Soji Solanke – 2018 African Club Co-President
- Amine Bendriss – 2018 African Club Co-President
- Elena Zhukova – 2018 African Club Conference Chair

=== Production ===
- R. Sibaoueih – artist team
- Wonu Talabi – artist assisting team (Conference)
- Abdellatif Abdul – Amazigh, Arabic and Berber linguist

== See also ==
- African Renaissance
- Iyasile Naa, painting
