= Alexander Amosu =

British/Nigerian luxury designer and entrepreneur

- Born: 21 June 1975 (age 50); Hampstead, London, England
- Education: South Bank University, University of North London
- Label: Alexander Amosu

Alexander Amosu (born 21 June 1975) is a British/Nigerian luxury designer and entrepreneur. He was named by Guinness World Records as having created the world's most expensive suit. His £240,000 Diamond Encrusted BlackBerry Curve 8900 is ranked the world's most expensive BlackBerry. He is also credited with producing the worlds's most expensive champagne. He has created exclusive luxury phone designs for Motorola, BlackBerry Limited, Apple and Samsung.

== Early life and education ==
Alexander was born at the Royal Free Hospital in Hampstead, London to Nigerian parents. Alexander studied Aeronautics at South Bank University, Computer Aided Engineering at the Queen Mary of Westfield University and Sound Engineering at University of North London. He holds an honorary degree of Doctor of Business Administration at London Metropolitan University. At 28, he hosted a TV show, Rich and Famous aired on Ben TV Sky 238.

== Career ==
Amosu started his first job at 12 doing paper round. At 16 he started a DJ group called Shadow King, charging £250 to DJ in homes and clubs. He wrote his first business plan, for a cleaning company called Home Care Cleaning Agency, at age 19, turning over £1,500 per week with a total of 12 clients and four employees. He made his first million pounds when he launched the first urban ringtones company in Europe, called Rnbringtones, at the age of 24 in 1999 and sold it in 2004. His current businesses includes the Alexander Amosu brand, Mind of an Entrepreneur (helping people with entrepreneurism), Lux Afrique - the first pan African Lifestyle and Concierge service, Board member of E2Exchange. In 2012, he launched Kamson Luxury Group, acquiring luxury brands to launch in Africa. His first acquisition was Ok! Magazine. He also launched his cigar business in 2018, making him the first African owed cigar company.

=== Collaborations ===
Amosu has spoken at a number of events globally, in May 2018 he shared the stage alongside other thought leaders at London Business School on an entrepreneurship panel, parallel to the events Amosu took part initialing massive collaboration art piece Remember To Rise.

== Awards ==
- Young Entrepreneur Of The Year - Institute of Directors (2002)
- 100 most influential black Britain
- World's most expensive suit ever designed- Guinness World Records
- Honorary degree of Doctor of Business Administration - London Metropolitan University
