= Wing Chun Foundation Lagos =

Nigerian non-governmental organization

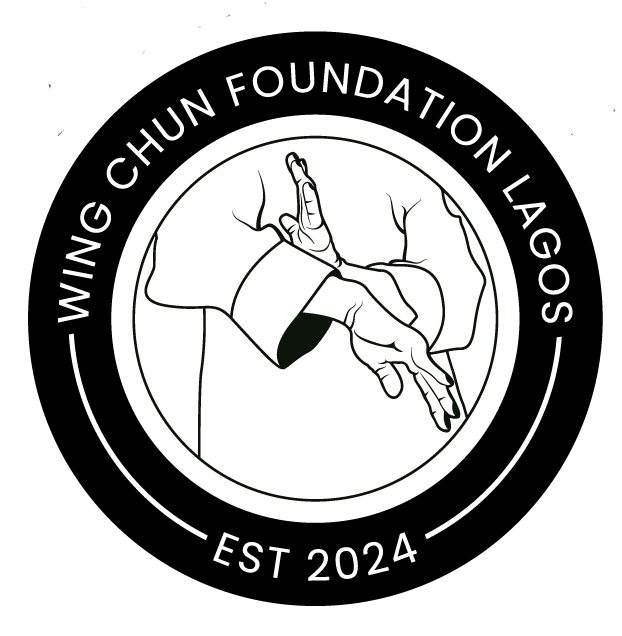
- Abbreviation: WCBFFWC
- Formation: 2024
- Founder: Ade Olufeko
- Type: Non-governmental organization; Private foundation
- Legal status: Active
- Purpose: Mental resilience & self-defence
- Location(s): Lagos City, Nigeria, West Africa
- Key people: Bolaji Ogunleye

Wing Chun Foundation Lagos, also known as the Wing Chun Body Fitness Foundation for Workers and Children, is an NGO based in Lagos, Nigeria. It focuses on mental resilience, emotional balance, and physical wellness through Wing Chun martial arts. The foundation offers structured training in Wing Chun, CQC, and Tai Chi, while also exploring indigenous West African martial traditions.

== History ==
Established in response to a growing demand for alternative wellness and self-discipline programs in Lagos, the foundation began by hosting a series of pop-up kwoons in both island and mainland locations within Lagos State. These sessions provided accessible martial arts instruction. On February 6, 2025, it became a member of the Lagos Chamber of Commerce and Industry (LCCI), West Africa's oldest chamber of commerce, an affiliation that has further connected it with broader cultural and economic initiatives in the region.

=== Leadership ===
The foundation is led by Ade Olufeko. His martial arts journey began with Wing Chun (Ving Tsun), training within the Moy Yat Ving Tsun System in both New York City and Houston, Texas, USA. His approach integrates principles of geometry and spatial awareness with traditional Wing Chun techniques, creating a structured system that emphasizes efficiency, adaptability, and situational awareness.

== Programs and training ==
Wing Chun Foundation Lagos offers a diverse curriculum tailored for a wide demographic that includes executives, expatriates, students, and community members. The training programs focus on developing self-defense skills, mental clarity, and physical wellness. A key initiative is the anti-bullying program, which equips secondary school students with practical self-defense techniques and strategies to build mental resilience. Additionally, the curriculum incorporates CPR and basic first responder training, ensuring that participants are prepared to handle emergencies, a natural extension of the foundation's holistic preparedness model.

== Socioeconomic impact ==
The foundation's model combines traditional Chinese martial arts with indigenous West African combat traditions. This integration is observed to refine combat techniques while potentially fostering community cohesion and addressing socioeconomic disparities by making high-quality training accessible to underprivileged communities. Through its CSR programs, the foundation partners with communities and organizations to provide training that enhances public safety and develops discipline among participants. While some critics have questioned the relevance of traditional Chinese methods in the Nigerian context, supporters argue that shared philosophical principles between these martial traditions enable effective adaptation and community empowerment.
