= Jake Okechukwu Effoduh =

Radio personality, human rights activist, lawyer

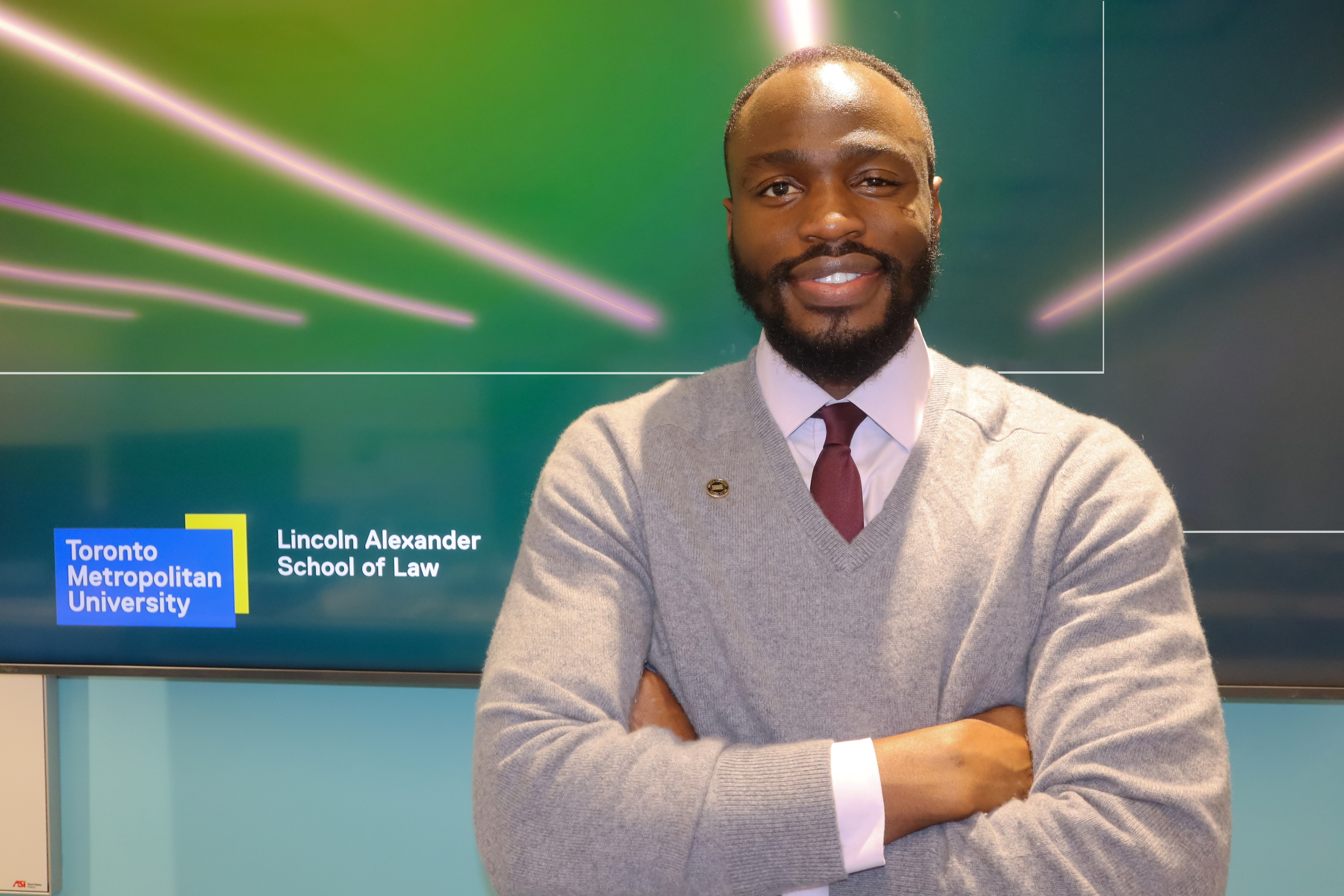
- Effoduh at the Lincoln Alexander School of Law, Canada, in 2024.
- Born: 12 December 1987 (age 38); Lagos, Nigeria
- Education: Osgoode Hall Law School, York University, University of Abuja, Nigerian Law School, University of Oxford
- Occupations: Lawyer and Academician
- Years active: 2006–present
- Known for: Radio presenter with BBC Media Action, human rights law, non-profit law, and Artificial intelligence law
- Website: effoduh.com.ng

Jake Okechukwu Effoduh (born 12 December 1987) is an attorney, academic and author currently serving as an assistant professor at the Lincoln Alexander School of Law at Toronto Metropolitan University in Canada. He is known for hosting Flava, a popular community radio show produced by BBC Media Action. He later hosted Talk Your Own: Make Naija Better, a radio programme that aired on over 100 stations across Nigeria, reaching millions of listeners. The programme tackled critical societal issues, ranging from health and education to civic rights and governance, aiming to empower Nigerians with knowledge and tools for advocacy.

== Early life and education ==
Effoduh was born in Lagos on 12 December 1987. In 1992, his family moved to Abuja where he attended primary school. For secondary school, he attended Federal Government College in Minna, Niger. At University of Abuja, he studied Public and International law and was involved as a president of several student organisations including the student magazine, human rights club, Red Cross Society, and International Humanitarian Law Advocates Club. He got a his Diploma in Civil and Private Law in 2006. He received his LL.B in public and international law in 2010, and became a founding partner of the school's "pro bono" office, which participated in several national and international law competitions, including one from Network of University Legal Aid Institution (NULAI). He went on to attend Nigerian Law School and was admitted to the Nigerian Bar Association in February 2012. He obtained his first masters degree from the University of Oxford in 2015 and a second masters from York University in 2017.

== Radio ==
Effoduh was a fan of BBC Media Action (BBC World Service Trust); when he heard that they were auditioning for a male presenter for a new show called Flava, he tried out and was eventually selected from 62 candidates. He originally freelanced as a radio presenter for the programme to help finance his university education, but it had also increased his desires to help the community. From 2006 to 2013, he anchored Flava, a youth lifestyle and sexual reproductive health magazine programme where he addressed issues on HIV/AIDS among others. Effoduh has noted that Flava grew to broadcast on 103 radio stations in Nigeria, and is one of the most popular radio programmes in the West Africa region. It also gave him an opportunity to travel to all 36 states of Nigeria, as well as 214 local government areas. In November 2012, Effoduh was recognised as the Best Community Show Presenter at the 2012 Nigeria Radio Awards.

In January 2013, Effoduh began hosting a new programme, Talk Your Own: Make Naija Better (Talk Your Own Make Nigeria Better) a 30-minute show covering governance issues in Nigeria. It has aired on over a hundred stations, with the aim of a more inclusive and wider listener base. He also noted that BBC Media Action wanted to train radio presenters to produce and host more localised shows.

== Career ==
For his National Youth Service Corps primary assignment (Note: Effoduh's assignment for the National Youth Service Corps took place from November 2011 to November 2012.) Effoduh worked in the law firm of Afe Babalola SAN & co. In 2013, he became a research fellow with the Nigerian Institute of Advanced Legal Studies.

He is a Partner at Praxis & Gnosis Law and a Vanier Scholar at the Osgoode Hall Law School in Canada. He is currently serving at the Global Future Council on Frontier Risks.

Effoduh is currently an assistant professor at the Lincoln Alexander School of Law of the Toronto Metropolitan University of Canada. Moreover, he served as the chief councillor of the Africa–Canada artificial intelligence and data Innovation Consortium (ACADIC), mobilizing AI and Big Data techniques which build public health strategies in Canada and other 20 African countries.

He is a member of the World Economic Forum’s Global Future Council on Frontier Risks and a Forum expert on human rights. He has held Fellowships at the Harvard Law School, Harvard Kennedy School, Mandela School of Governance (South Africa), and the Pan-African Lawyers Union (Tanzania).

== Activism ==
In August 2011, Effoduh spent three weeks in the quarters of the sex worker community in the Federal Capital Territory (FCT) of Nigeria, where he researched the human rights abuses faced by that population. He presented "Legal Protection of Sex Workers: a need to achieving effective HIV/AIDS intervention in the sex worker population of Nigeria" as a poster exhibition at the XIX International AIDS Conference held in Washington, DC in July 2012. He also presented his information at the TEDxAbuja conference in October.

In June 2012, he was invited by the United States Department of State to be the Nigerian representative and one of 20 journalists from 20 countries for a global reporting tour. He has published a series of articles of his experience there.

Effoduh has been involved with the Sickle Cell Aid Foundation (SCAF), established in 2010 as a non-governmental organisation (NGO) for the aid and support of indigent persons diagnosed with sickle cell anaemia in Nigeria. SCAF has set up sickle cell clubs in many secondary schools; in 2011 they donated drugs to local hospitals in the FCT and campaigned for better educating the public on sickle cell anaemia. In 2012, he introduced the Know Your Genotype campaign, which provides free genotype testing for one million Nigerians. He served as the organisation's vice-president. He was nominated for The Future Awards Africa for his advocacy work in 2013.

In 2017, Effoduh moderated a panel at Oxford University's OAC Breaking the Frame[works] conference at the Blavatnik School of Government, discussing the changing state of the African continent, on the topics of media transformation and technology. He was part of the initialing of monumental heirloom the Philosopher's Legacy.

== Publications ==
=== Published book and book chapters in edited collections ===
- Effoduh, J.O. (2024). Artificial Intelligence and Human Rights in Africa. In C Ncube, D Oriakhogba, I Rutenberg, T Schonwetter (eds) Artificial Intelligence and the Law in Africa.
- Effoduh, J.O. (2022). The Community Court of Justice of the Ecowas and the Advancement of Human Rights and Social Justice Reform in West Africa: Three Landmark Cases. In: Adeola, A., Mutua, M.W. (eds) The Palgrave Handbook of Democracy, Governance and Justice in Africa. Palgrave Macmillan, Cham.
- Jude Dzevela Kong, Kesha Fevrier, Jake Okechukwu Effoduh, and Nicola Luigi Bragazzia, “Artificial Intelligence, Law and Vulnerabilities” (Chapter 11) In El Morr, C. (2022). AI and Society: Tensions and Opportunities (1st ed.).
- Effoduh Jake Okechukwu, A Decade at the Bar: An Anthology of Professional Legal Experiences, Narrative Landscape Publishing 2022. Book. pp 1 – 233.
- Obiora C. Okafor and Effoduh J. Okechukwu, The ECOWAS Court as a (Promising) Resource for Pro-Poor Activist Forces In: The Performance of Africa’s International Courts. Edited by: James Thuo Gathii, Oxford University Press (2020). DOI: 10.1093/oso/9780198868477.003.0004. (Peer reviewed)
- Effoduh O, The Corporate Responsibility to Respect Human Rights (Corporate Governance and Responsibility by the Nigerian Institute of Advanced Legal Studies 2014) Cap. 5 NIALS Press, pp. 100 – 148. (Peer reviewed)
- Effoduh O, The United Nations, and the Laws of War (The Laws of War and The Use of Force by the Nigerian Institute of Advanced Legal Studies 2014) Cap. 1 NIALS Press, pp. 1 – 44. (Peer reviewed)
- Effoduh O, The Economic Development of Nigeria from 1914 to 2014 (The Nigeria Centenary Publication by the Nigerian Institute of Advanced legal Studies 2013) Cap. 30. NIALS Press, 2013 pp. 794 – 1005. (Peer reviewed)
- Effoduh O, Combatting Transnational Money Laundering: A Case for Special Taxation (Money Laundering and Policy by the Nigerian Institute of Advanced Legal Studies 2013) Cap. 11 NIALS Pres s, pp. 352 – 398. (Peer reviewed)

=== Peer-reviewed journal articles ===
- Effoduh, Jake Okechukwu, “A Global South Perspective to Explainable Artificial Intelligence” (Carnegie Endowment for International Peace) April 2024
- Jake Okechukwu Effoduh et al “Leveraging Responsible, Explainable, and Local Artificial Intelligence Solutions for Clinical Public Health in the Global South”. Healthcare. 2023; 11(4):457.
- Effoduh, Jake Okechukwu and Akpudo, Ugochukwu Ejike and Kong, Jude Dzevela, Towards an Inclusive Data Governance Policy for the Use of Artificial Intelligence in Africa (September 23, 2023).
- Effoduh O J, Regulating Self Driving Cars An Afircan Perspective? Third World Approaches to International Law Review (Issue 3, 2023)
- Obiora Chinedu Okafor, Udoka Ndidiamaka Owie, Okechukwu Effoduh, and Rahina Zarma. (2022). “The ECOWAS Court and Civil Society Activists in Nigeria: An Anatomy and Analysis of a Robust Symbiosis”, African Journal of Legal Studies (2022).
- Obiora Chinedu Okafor, Udoka Owie, Okechukwu Effoduh, and Rahina Zarma “On the Modest Impact of West Africa’s International Human Rights Court on the Executive Branch of Government in Nigeria” Harvard Human Rights Journal Volume 35, Spring 2022 Harvard Human Rights Journal Volume 35, Spring 2022
- Effoduh J, O, “The Legitimization of Customized Sex Robots in the Age of COVID-19” (2021) Intellectual Property Journal (2021) 33 I.P.J No 2 (Thomson Reuters) pp. 161 – 181.
- Effoduh O J, “Should the Use of Lethal Autonomous Robots Be Permitted in International Warfare?” The Journal of Robotics, Artificial Intelligence and & Law (Volume 4, No.1. February 2021). Pp 17 – 27.
- Effoduh, Jake Okechukwu, “Governance Activism for the Inclusive Development of Security in Northern Nigeria” University of Cape Town Mandela School of Public Governance (2016).

=== Articles ===
- Effoduh, J.O "Colonial Judicial Legacy as a Latent Challenge for the Adoption of Algorithmic Sentencing in African Courts" 2024
- Effoduh, J.O "Africa’s AI Odyssey": Surfing the waves of innovation amidst digital storms 2024
- Lawfare Daily: Jake Effoduh on AI and the Global South 2024
- Effoduh, J.O Scholarly Publishing in the Era of Open Access and Generative AI 2024
- Effoduh, J.O “AI gaydar” and the consequences for Queer privacy in Africa (Open Global Rights) February 2025
- Dennis, C., Manning, S., Clare, S., Effoduh, OJ et al. (2025). Options and Motivations for International AI Benefit Sharing. Centre for the Governance of AI. (Centre for the Governance of AI)
- Effoduh Jake Okechukwu, “The Role and Potential of Artificial Intelligence in Extremist-Fuelled Election Misinformation in Africa” The Global Network on Extremism and Technology (the academic research arm of the Global Internet Forum)
- Effoduh, Jake Okechukwu. “Book Review: Litigating Artificial Intelligence by Jesse Beatson, Gerold Chan, and Jill R. Presser.” The Transnational Human Rights Review 10. (2023) DOI:
- Effoduh Jake Okechukwu, “Why Nigeria's #EndSARS movement is more than a call to end police brutality” World Economic Forum (21 December 2020)

== Artificial Intelligence, Law, and Social Justice ==
Effoduh’s research delves into the intersections of international law, human rights, and artificial intelligence, exploring how these fields converge to shape social justice. His scholarly contributions have been featured in some publications, including the Harvard Human Rights Journal, Oxford University Press, Journal of Robotics, AI & Law, African Journal of Legal Studies, and TWAIL Review. Currently, he serves as Production Editor for the Transnational Human Rights Review, a peer-reviewed journal dedicated to advancing transnational human rights principles and practices.

Effoduh has lectured at institutions across Canada, Nigeria, Kenya, South Africa, Germany, Spain, and the UK. As a Ph.D. candidate at Osgoode Hall Law School, his research investigates the influence of AI on human rights in Africa, focusing on whether AI will help resolve or exacerbate the “popular legitimization crises” that activist movements in the region are confronting.

== Personal life ==
Effoduh's family is Catholic, but he has mentioned that his childhood friends were Muslims from northern Nigeria.
