= Nawal M. Nour =

American obstetrician/gynecologist

- Born: 1966 (age 59–60); Khartoum, Sudan
- Education: Brown University, Harvard Medical School
- Known for: African Women's Health Practice
- Awards: MacArthur Fellows Program
- Scientific career
- Fields: obstetrician and gynecologist

Nawal M. Nour is an obstetrician/gynecologist who directs the Ambulatory Obstetrics Practice at the Brigham and Women's Hospital. Her research and practice focus on providing the right care to women who have undergone female genital mutilation/cutting (FGM/C), also called female circumcision, and she founded the first and only hospital center in the U.S. that focuses on the medical needs of African women who have undergone FGM/C. In 2017, she was listed in Forbes among 40 Women To Watch.

== Early life ==
Nour was born in 1966 in Khartoum, Sudan, and was raised in Egypt and England. She reports that she always had two major interests as a young woman: women's health and helping the world. As a child, she was surrounded by FGC/M but was inspired to focus her work on it by Nawal El Saadawi's book, in which Saadawi describes her own circumcision. Nour attended Brown University, and went to Harvard Medical School to get her medical degree.

== Career ==
As a medical doctor, Nour gathered a group of patients who were all women who had undergone FGM/C. She worked at Brigham and Women's hospital, and in 1999 created the African Women's Health Center, which provides holistic care to women who have been circumcised. She talks about the care they give women: "The kind of care we give is no better than any other care...We're basically physicians...who understand that there are some women out there who have been circumcised and in some ways it's not something we want to make a big deal about. We want to nurture these patients, but we don't want to ostracize them." She researches health and policy of FGM/C. Nour has developed and studied difibulation, a surgical process to alleviate some of the negative effects FGM/C has on women's health. Her work aims both to educate doctors caring for women who have been circumcised, and to eradicate FGM/C.

== Awards ==
- 2003 MacArthur Fellows Program
- 1998-1999 Reede Scholar

== Other ==
Dr Nour joined other thought leaders at Oxford University's OAC: Breaking the Frame[works] conference at the Blavatnik School of Government. She took part initialing monumental heirloom the Philosophers Legacy.

== Works ==
- "Defibulation to treat female genital cutting: effect on symptoms and sexual function", Obstet Gyncol, 2006
- "Female genital cutting: A persisting practice", Rev Obstet Gynecol, 2008
- "Effectiveness of interventions designed to reduce the prevalence of female genital mutilation/cutting", The WHO Reproductive Health Library, December 1, 2010
- "Challenging the Use of Race in the Vaginal Birth after Cesarean Section Calculator", Women's Health Issues, February 18, 2019
