= Chuks Anyaduba =

Nigerian filmmaker, lawyer and humanitarian

Chukwuebuka Anyaduba
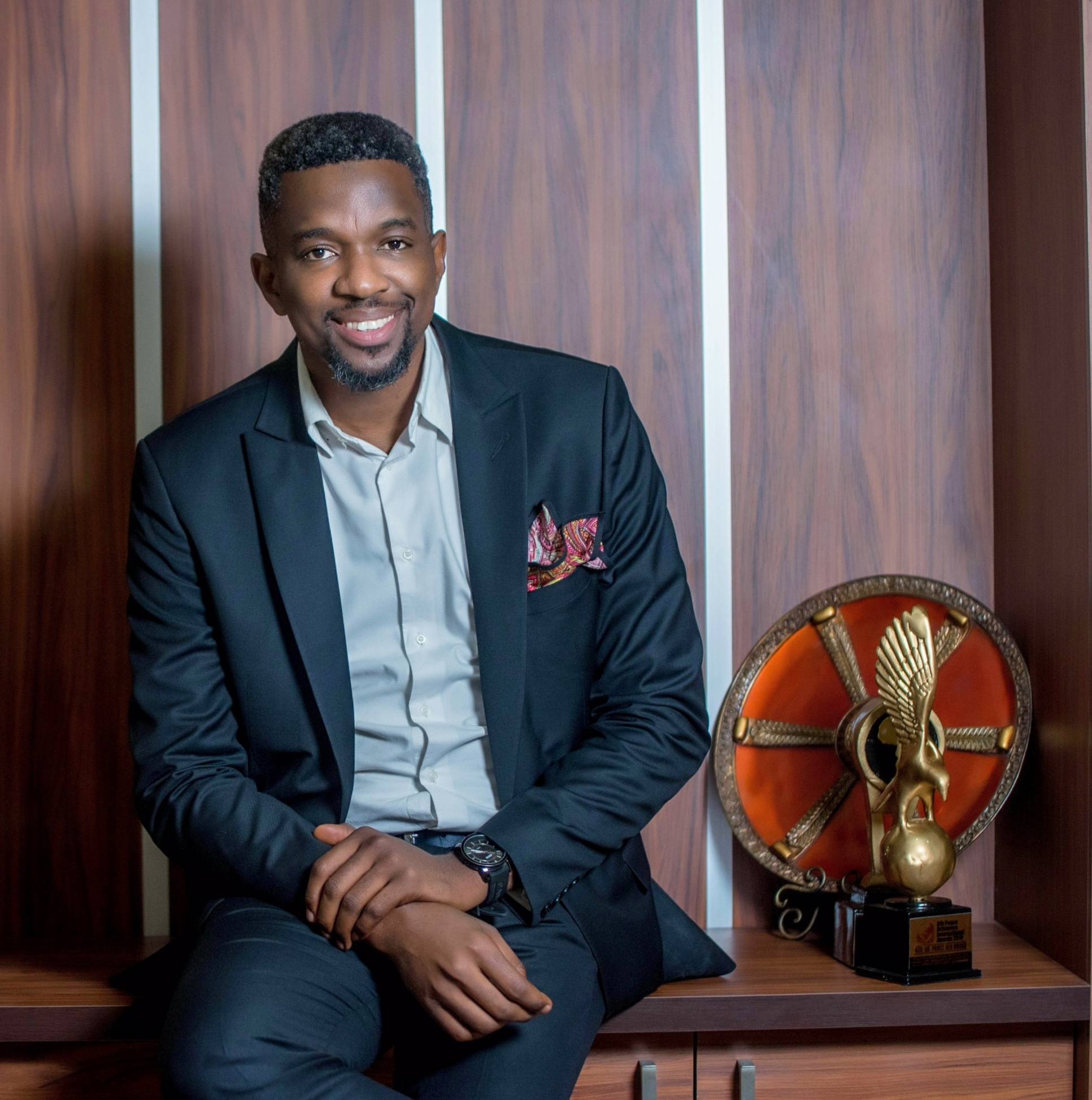
- Born: 27 March 1984 (age 42); Onitsha, Anambra, Nigeria
- Education: University of Abuja
- Occupations: Lawyer, project consultant, filmmaker
- Years active: 2012-present

Chukwuebuka "Chuks" Anyaduba (born March 27, 1984) is a Nigerian filmmaker, lawyer, humanitarian and project management consultant. His 2015 film, Side Effects showcases the side effects of prostate cancer.

== Early life ==
Anyaduba was born in Onitsha in Onitsha North Local Government Area of Anambra State. He earned a Bachelor of Law degree from University of Abuja in Nigeria. As an undergraduate, Chukwuebuka was a student Brand Ambassador Lead for Nokia. He drove grassroots campaigns in campuses for other brands such as BlackBerry and Chivita. He is an AIESEC alumnus.

== Career ==
Anyaduba's acting career kicked off with MNET Africa when he starred in the longest-running African TV Series Tinsel. He has since then appeared in numerous Nollywood movies. He has also produced two movies The Matchmaker and Side Effects.

Anyaduba is the Executive Director of TOG Media Consults, a Media Consulting, Content Development and Event Production firm. He has organized and produced several events including; Nigeria Radio Awards, African Achievers Awards (2011 and 2012), Young CEO Business Summit (2014), Stand Up For Dads, Warri Again, Flourish African Conference (2017), Seyi Tinubu Empowerment Project (STEP) and Nigeria Roadsafety Forum.

Anyaduba currently serves as the Project Director of the Ned Nwoko Malaria Eradication Project, an initiative of the Ned Nwoko Foundation. He was the Director of International Security Cooperation and Head of Digital Media at African Bar Association. He was the talent manager for rap sensation and model Descushiel.

== Advocacy ==
Anyaduba is an Advocate of the United Nations Sustainable Development Goals and founder of International Initiative for the Advancement of SDGs in Africa (IIASDG), an NGO that promotes the UN Sustainable Development Goals in Africa. He is the initiator of some advocacy projects which includes; Stand Up For Dads; An Awareness on Prostate Cancer, Nigerian Road safety Forum in Nigeria to drive awareness on pedestrian lanes and safety of Kids to School, Paint With The Stars; A Fundraising Event for Sickle cell Patients, etc. He is currently Director for Projects and Partnership at the African Sickle Cell Support Foundation, an International NGO based in the US. As a spokesperson and liaison officer for The Good Fathers Foundation, he coordinated the smooth running of the Litre of Light Project, a Community Development and Human Empowerment Projects for fathers and kids who have no father figures in partnership with the University of Nottingham UK and Litre of Light. In the 2017 United Nations Road safety Week, he organized the SAFECROSS project; An Awareness on Pedestrian Crossing in Nigeria with the support of the United Nations Information Centre (UNIC) in Lagos Nigeria.

Anyaduba is passionate about SDGs, Health, Education and Youth Empowerment. He is currently the Commissioner For Youths Nigeria and Board Member of the Global SDGs Youth Summit Board. Through the IIASDG he founded the SDG Media Zone Africa and has organized 3 editions in Nigeria, Liberia and Ghana and plans to take it across other countries in Africa.

== Selected filmography ==
- Dagger
- Jenifa's Diary
- Protégé
- Sequence
- Anita
- The Matchmaker
- Side Effects
- Ma Famille
