= Unilever Nigeria Plc =

Publicly listed company

- Industry: Consumer goods
- Predecessor: Lever Brothers Nigeria, Unilever Nigeria
- Founded: 1923
- Headquarters: Lagos, Nigeria
- Key people: Nnaemeka Alfred Ugochukwu Achebe
- Products: Close-Up (toothpaste), Pepsodent toothpaste, LUX soap, Lifebuoy soap, Rexona, Vaseline lotion and Vaseline Petroleum Jelly, Blue Band Margarine, Lipton Yellow Label Tea and Knorr
- Revenue: 90.77 billion naira (2017)
- Operating income: 12.95 billion naira (2017)
- Net income: 7.45 billion naira (2017)
- Website: https://www.unilevernigeria.com/

Unilever Nigeria Plc is a publicly listed company with trading and manufacturing interest in the consumer goods market. In 2014, it was listed among the top 20 most valuable companies quoted on the Nigerian Stock Exchange. Unilever Nigeria PLC is a subsidiary of Unilever Overseas Holding B.V.

== History ==
=== Lever Brothers ===
Unilever history in Nigeria dates back to 1923 when Robert Hesketh Leverhulme opened a trading post in Nigeria under the business name, Lever Brothers (West Africa) Ltd. The firm was primarily engaged in trading of soap and in 1924, the name was changed to West African Soap Company. Sensing opportunity in the country, the firm opened a soap factory in Apapa in 1925. The company later expanded into the production of food products, it opened a new soap factory in Aba in 1958 and changed its name to Lever Brothers Nigeria Limited in 1955. In 1960, Lever Brothers introduced Omo detergent into the market, the new product gained traction among buyers, prompting the firm to commission a factory to manufacture Omo detergents in 1964.

In compliance with the indigenisation decree of 1972, Unilever became a publicly listed company in 1973, selling 60% of its shares to the Nigerian public. The company became a Nigerian owned firm. The change in equity ownership did not affect the firm's growth. In 1982, the firm began producing edible products such as Royco, Blue band and Tree top in Agbara, Ogun State.

In addition, the company went through a period of mergers and acquisition; acquiring Lipton Nigeria in 1985 and later merging with Vaseline manufacturer, Chesebrough Products Industries in 1988. During this period, the company embarked on a backward integration scheme in order to source its raw materials locally. This business decision led the company to invest in crop production and oil palm milling. The company also invested in a tea plantation in Mambilla to provide raw materials for Lipton.

=== Unilever ===
In 1995, Lever Brothers, 40% owned by Unilever merged with Unilever Nigeria Limited, a subsidiary of the Unilever U.K. The merger gave Unilever control of the newly merged entity, this was the first time since the indigenisation decree was scrapped that a multinational will have majority equity in a quoted Nigerian company. Prior to the merger, in 1994, Unilever group acquired A.J. Seward, a personal care products manufacturer from UAC Nigeria.

In 2001, the company changed its name to Unilever Nigeria Plc.

== Products ==
Unilever Nigeria Plc is involved in the manufacturing and marketing of foods and food ingredients as well as home and personal care products. The company has manufacturing plants in Agbara, Ogun State and Oregun, Lagos State.
