= Tokunbo Talabi =

Nigerian banker

Tokunbo Joseph Talabi

Secretary to the State Government of Ogun State
- Incumbent
- Assumed office June 2019
- Governor: Dapo Abiodun

Personal details
- Born: 1962 (age 63–64) Ogun State, Nigeria
- Education: University of Lagos
- Occupation: Banker, politician

Tokunbo Joseph Talabi is a Nigerian banker, entrepreneur, and business development specialist who serves as the Secretary to the State Government of Ogun State.

== Early life and education ==
Talabi was born in 1962. He obtained a master's degree in Business Administration from the University of Lagos in 1987. He also received professional training at the Citibank School of Banking, Long Island, New York.

== Career ==
Talabi's professional background is in the private sector. He was part of the pioneer team at Guaranty Trust Bank, where he held several roles. He also contributed to the publication The Nigerian Economist.

Before he was appointed Secretary to the State Government, he served as managing director and chief executive officer of Superflux International Limited.

In June 2019, Ogun State governor Dapo Abiodun appointed him Secretary to the State Government, a position he continues to hold.
