= List of University of Lagos people =

The list of University of Lagos people includes notable graduates, professors, and administrators affiliated with the University of Lagos.

== Notable alumni, faculty and staff ==
=== Vice-Chancellors ===
- Professor Folasade Ogunsola: 2022–present
- Professor Oluwatoyin Ogundipe: 2017–2022
- Professor Rahmon Ade Bello: 2012–2017
- Professor Babatunde Adetokunbo Sofoluwe: 2010–2012
- Professor Tolu Olukayode Odugbemi: 2007–2010
- Professor Oyewusi Ibidapo Obe: Ag, 2000–2002; 2002–2007
- Professor Jelili Adebisi Omotola: 1995–2000
- Professor Nurudeen Oladapo Alao: 1988–1995
- Professor Akinpelu Oludele Adesola: 1981–1988
- Professor Babatunde Kwaku Adadevoh: 1978–1980
- Professor Jacob F. Adeniyi Ajayi: 1972–1978
- Professor Saburi Biobaku: 1965–1971
- Professor Eni Njoku: 1962–1965

=== Notable faculty ===
- Ayodele Awojobi
- Laurence Gower
- David Aradeon
- Paul Unongo
- Akin Euba
- Cornelius Taiwo
- Chike Obi
- Taslim Olawale Elias

=== Notable alumni ===
- Daniel Kolawole Olukoya, pastor, scientist and professor
- Fabian Ajogwu, lawyer
- Francis Agu, actor
- Funke Akindele, actress
- Omowunmi Akinnifesi, public relations consultant, former MBGN
- IllRymz, musician and television personality
- Winifred Akpani, businesswoman
- Bisi Alimi, gay rights activist
- Lola Akande, author and academic
- Daré Art-Aladé, singer
- Reekado Banks, singer
- Wunmi Obe, singer
- Adewale Ayuba, singer
- Regina Askia-Williams, nurse practitioner, actress, and former Miss Unilag
- Philip Begho, writer
- Funsho Williams, civil servant
- Stella Damasus, actress
- Denrele, television presenter.
- Eniola Akinkuotu, journalist
- Sasha P, rapper, musician, businesswoman, lawyer and motivational speaker
- Akin Babalola Kamar Odunsi, politician
- Ufuoma McDermott, model and actress
- Fidelis Oditah, lawyer
- Grace Ekpiwhre, former minister
- eLDee, rapper
- Linda Ikeji, former model and blogger
- Oby Ezekwesili, accountant
- Kayode Fayemi, former Ekiti governor
- Kate Henshaw, actress
- Matilda Kerry, doctor, former MBGN
- Oliver Mbamara, lawyer
- Richard Mofe-Damijo, actor
- Tony Momoh, lawyer
- Genevieve Nnaji, actress
- Ramsey Nouah, actor
- Chinenye Ochuba, former MBGN
- Bayo Ojo, lawyer
- Ikedi Ohakim, former Imo governor
- Afolabi Olabimtan, writer
- Dele Olojede, journalist
- Simbo Olorunfemi, writer and television producer
- Mike Omoighe, artist
- Helen Ovbiagele, writer
- Joke Silva, actress
- Adetokunbo Kayode, former minister
- Ganiyu Solomon, politician
- Farida Mzamber Waziri, EFCC chairman
- Kunlé Adeyemi, architect
- Tony Elumelu, economist
- Helen Paul, comedian
- Chude Jideonwo, journalist
- Koffi Idowu Nuel, comedian
- Akinwunmi Ambode, former Accountant-General of Lagos State and former Governor of Lagos State
- Jimi Agbaje, Lagos State governorship candidate for 2015 elections
- Yakubu Itua, former member federal house of representative 1983 and former judge High Court of Justice, Benin-City
- Sarah Jibril, Nigeria's first female presidential aspirant.
- Omoyemi Akerele, fashion designer and founder of Style House Files
- Sophie Oluwole, philosopher
- Abayomi Owope: TV presenter
- Timini Egbuson, actor
- Dakore Akande, actress
- Ifeanyi Chudy Momah Politician, Lawyer and Member Federal House of Representatives.
- Victoria Inyama, Nigerian actress.
- Moyo Lawal, Nigerian actress
- Jibola Dabo, Nigerian actor
- Bobrisky, Nigerian transgender entrepreneur
- Shade Omoniyi, Nigeria actress
- Tim Owhefere, Nigerian politician
- Laycon, rapper
- Emilia Asim-Ita, entrepreneur
- Tobi Bakre, actor and presenter
- Broda Shaggi, comedian
- Chris Omoijiade, thought leader, author, and speaker
- Ademola Adenle, scholar, policy advisor and Senior Special Adviser on Agricultural Innovation
