= Omotolani =

Nigerian given name

- Gender: Female
- Language: Yoruba

Origin
- Origin: Nigeria
- Region of origin: South West, Nigeria

Omotolani is a Nigerian female given name of Yoruba origin. It means "The child is old/prominent/important enough to have wealth".

Notable individuals with the name include:

- Omotola Jalade Ekeinde (7 February 1978), Nigerian actress and singer
- Tolani Omotola (born 16 April 1998), footballer of African origin
- Jelili Adebisi Omotola (20 April 1941 – 29 March 2006), Nigerian professor and Senior Advocate of Nigeria (SAN)
- Sophia Omotola Omidiji (born June 18, 1997), Nigerian-American football player
- Lateef Omidiji (born 14 September 2003).
