= Eniola =

- Gender: Unisex
- Language: Yoruba

Origin
- Origin: Nigeria
- Meaning: Wealthy person or an influential person
- Region of origin: South West, Nigeria

Eniola // is a Nigerian unisex name of Yoruba origin, serving as both a unisex given name and surname. Eniola means "a wealthy person or an influential person". It is more commonly associated with female individuals.

== Given name ==
- Eniola Abioro (born 1999), Nigerian fashion model.
- Eniola Olaitan Ajayi (born 1965), Nigerian politician and diplomat.
- Eniola Ajao (fl. 2004–present, as of 2022), Nigerian actress.
- Eniola Akinbo (born 1985), Nigerian singer and songwriter known professionally as Niyola.
- Eniola Akinkuotu (born 1986), Nigerian journalist and writer.
- Eniola Aluko (born 1987), Nigerian footballer.
- Eniola Badmus (born 1982), Nigerian actress.
- Grace Eniola Soyinka (1908–1983), Nigerian shopkeeper and activist.

== Surname ==
- Abi Eniola (fl. 1991–2009), British actress.
- Lola Eniola-Adefeso (fl. 2006–present, as of 2021), Nigerian-American chemical engineer.
