= Omidiji =

Nigerian given name

- Gender: Unisex
- Language: Yoruba

Origin
- Origin: Nigerian
- Meaning: The river has become a shade
- Region of origin: South-west Nigeria

OmidijiOmídìjí is a Nigerian surname of Yoruba origin, meaning "The river has become a shade" or "The river will provide shelter." It is composed of the Yoruba words “omi” (water or river), “di” (to become or transform), and “ìjì” (shadow, shade, or hiding place), giving it the morphological structure omi-di-ìjí.

== Notable people with the surname ==
- Lateef Omidiji (born 2003) football player.
- Sophia Omotola Omidiji – Nigerian-American football player.
