= Chess in Slums Africa =

Nigerian chess organization

- Formation: September 2018; 8 years ago
- Type: Non-profit
- Legal status: Foundation
- Headquarters: 150 Ikorodu Road | Onipanu, Lagos State, Nigeria
- Founder: Tunde Onakoya
- Affiliations: Chess.com
- Website: chessinslumsafrica.com

Chess in Slums Africa is a non-profit organization dedicated to bringing chess to poor communities. Founded in September 2018 by Tunde Onakoya, the organization aims to use chess as a tool for social change and cognitive development.

== Founding and vision ==
Chess in Slums Africa was established by Tunde Onakoya after he returned to his home slum in Nigeria. Coming from an economically disadvantaged background himself, Onakoya believed that chess could provide a way out of poverty and societal denigration. The mission of Chess in Slums Africa is to empower, uplift, and educate children in slum communities. The organization believes that every child deserves an equal opportunity to attain a better life, regardless of their background. Chess in Slums Africa operates by going into the trenches of slum areas to teach and coach chess to children.

As of 2024, Chess in Slums Africa has secured lifelong scholarships for over 200 children from indigent homes. The organization has partnered with Chess.com, Lufthansa Airlines and other bodies.

== See also ==
- Chess in Africa
- Nigeria Chess Federation
- Tunde Onakoya
