= Nigeria Chess Federation =

Governing body for chess in Nigeria

- Sport: Chess
- Jurisdiction: Nigeria
- Founded: 1975
- Regional affiliation: (African Union) African Chess Confederation
- Headquarters: Abuja
- President: Sen. Ibrahim Hassan Dankwambo
- Secretary: Ejiro Thukson

Official website
- nigeriachessfederation.com

The Nigeria Chess Federation (NCF) is the official governing body for the sport of chess in Nigeria. It is responsible for the organisation, promotion, regulation, and development of chess across the country, including the sanctioning of national competitions, rating of players, and representation of Nigeria in international chess forums. The Federation is affiliated with the FIDE, the world governing body for chess, and is part of the African Chess Confederation.

== History ==
The Nigeria Chess Federation was established in 1975 and became a member of FIDE in 1978, allowing Nigerian players to compete in international tournaments and be included in global rating systems.

Prominent figures in the early years of Nigerian chess include Sylvan Olisanye Ebigwei, often credited as a leading founder and promoter of chess in Nigeria and Africa. Ebigwei served in various roles within regional chess organisations and helped form institutional structures for the sport in Nigeria.

== Structure ==
The Federation is governed by an elected board that manages various aspects of the sport nationally. As of 2025, the President of the NCF is Senator Ibrahim Hassan Dankwambo, with Adewole Adeyinka Samuel serving as vice president and Ejiro Thukson as Secretary.

== Activities ==
The NCF sanctions and organises national competitions, including the Nigeria National Chess Championships, which feature top players from across the country. In addition, the Federation helps coordinate the Nigerian team's participation in continental and global events.

In 2025, for the first time, Nigeria hosted the FIDE Zone 4.2 Chess Championship in Lagos, featuring participants from across West Africa and marking the celebration of the Federation's 50th anniversary.

The Federation also conducts training programs for arbiters, coaches, and officials to uphold international chess standards and promote the sport at grassroots levels.

== International affiliations ==
The Federation's affiliation with FIDE allows Nigerian players to compete in FIDE-rated events and be part of the official world rating system. The NCF also collaborates with the African Chess Confederation on regional chess development initiatives.

== See also ==
- Chess in Slums Africa (Nigerian chess organisation)
- Sylvan Ebigwei (prominent chess promoter in Nigeria and Africa)
