= Sofoluwe =

Ṣófolúwẹ̀
- Gender: Male
- Language: Yoruba

Origin
- Origin: Nigeria
- Meaning: The sorcerer bathes with notability/success.
- Region of origin: South West, Nigeria

Other names
- Variant form: Oṣófolúwẹ̀

Ṣófolúwẹ̀ audio is a Nigerian a surname of Yoruba origin, which means "The sorcerer bathes with notability/success". The diminutive form is Oṣófolúwẹ̀ with the same meaning.

== Notable individuals with the name ==
- Babatunde Adetokunbo Sofoluwe (1950–2012), Nigerian academic
- Yisa Sofoluwe (1967–2021), Nigerian footballer
