= Ibidapo =

Nigerian given name

- Gender: Male
- Language: Yoruba

Origin
- Origin: Nigerian
- Meaning: "child born to parents with genealogical ties"
- Region of origin: South-west Nigeria

IbidapoIbidapo is a Nigerian given name and surname of Yoruba origin, mainly used in southwestern Nigeria. The name is a combination of the words “ìbí” (birth, family, or lineage), “dà” (pour), “pọ̀” (together), and “dàpọ̀” (mix). It traditionally refers to a "child born to parents with genealogical ties" or from closely related family backgrounds. Morphologically, it is written as ìbí-dà-pọ̀.

== Notable people with the name ==
- Oyewusi Ibidapo-Obe (1949 - 2021) Nigerian professor.
