= College of Medicine, University of Lagos =

Nigerian Medical School

- Other names: Medilag
- Motto: In deed and in truth
- Type: Federal (Public)
- Established: 1962
- Parent institution: University of Lagos
- Academic affiliations: Lagos University Teaching Hospital
- Provost: Ademola Oremosu
- Students: 2000
- Location: Idi-Araba, Lagos, Nigeria; 6°31′05″N 3°21′24″E
- Website: cmul.unilag.edu.ng

College of Medicine, University of Lagos (CMUL) also known as Medilag is the medical school affiliated with the University of Lagos in Nigeria. It is located in Idi-Araba, Lagos beside its sister institution, the Lagos University Teaching Hospital. The college has a total staff of 1,850 in 32 departments.

== History ==
The college of medicine was established on 13 April 1962 by an act of the Federal Parliament within the University of Lagos to train professionals in medicine, dentistry and other health-allied fields. The first batch of 28 medical students were admitted into the college in October 1962 and they received their first lectures on October 3, 1962.

== Faculties ==
The college has 3 faculties including:

- Faculty of Basic Medical Sciences
- Faculty of Clinical Sciences
- Faculty of Dental Sciences

The degrees awarded include:

- Bachelor of Medicine, Bachelor of Surgery (MB;BS)
- Bachelor of Dental Surgery (BDS)
- Bachelor of Pharmacy (BPharm)
- Bachelor of Physiotherapy (B.Physio)
- Bachelor of Nursing Science (BN.Sc)
- Bachelor of Science, Physiology (BSc. Physiology)
- Bachelor of Science, Pharmacology (BSc. Pharmacology)
- Bachelor of Science, Medical Radiography (BSc. Radiography)
- Bachelor of Medical Laboratory Science (BMLS)

The college also offers postgraduate training in Anatomy, Physiology, Biochemistry, Microbiology and Public Health.

== Research and collaboration ==
The college is involved in research including research on HIV/AIDS, malaria, MDR Tuberculosis, Lassa fever and so on. It has a Central Research Laboratory (CRC) that serves as a research hub. It also has a research ethics committee which approves all research.

It has ongoing collaborations with WHO/TDR, CDC, Hospital for Tropical Diseases [HTD], Australia Army Malaria Institute, Foundation for Innovative New Diagnostics (FIND), Geneva, Family Health International (FHI), Harvard/APINS and Volkswagen Stifung Foundation, Germany on issues relating to malaria, HIV/AIDS, Lassa fever, Tuberculosis and so on.

== Notable alumni ==
- Tolu Olukayode Odugbemi, Nigerian Professor
- Dr Tunji Alausa, Nigerian Minister of Education
- Folasade Ogunsola
- Bruce Ovbiagele
- Jemima Osunde
- Fola David
- Sylvan Ebigwei
- Abraham Osinubi, Nigerian professor, medical doctor and anatomist.
