= Onakoya =

- Language: Yoruba

Origin
- Region of origin: West Africa

Onakoya is a Yoruba surname. Notable people with the surname include:

- Abiola Onakoya, Nigerian athlete
- Tunde Onakoya, Nigerian chess coach
