= Susan Namangale =

Malawian chess player (born 1976)

Personal information
- Born: March 1976 (age 50) Chombo, Nkhotakota, Central Region, Malawi

Chess career
- Country: Malawi
- Peak rating: 1571 (March 2024)

Susan Namangale (born March 1976) is a Malawian chess player. She has played a notable role in the spread of chess in Malawi and southern Africa and has had leadership roles in organisations including the Chess Association of Malawi and the International Chess Federation.

== Personal life ==
Namangale was born and raised in Chombo, a village in Nkhotakota along Lake Malawi. She was one of eight children raised by a single mother. Namangale attended Providence Secondary School before studying environmental science at university, graduating with a bachelor's degree in 1999. In 2013, Namangale received a master's degree in business administration. Before focusing on chess, Namangale worked in corporate settings, including for the World Bank.

Namangale has three children and lives in Lilongwe.

== Chess career and activism ==
Namangale first played chess when she was nine, after her sister received a chessboard from Peace Corps volunteers. She later pooled together pocket money with other pupils to buy two chessboards for her primary school. Namangale began actively playing chess during secondary school and during her time at university, where she was one of two women members of the chess club.

Namangale was a member of the first Malawian chess team to travel internationally after competing at a tournament in Zambia. In 2024, she was part of the Malawian delegation sent to the 45th Chess Olympiad in Budapest, Hungary.

Namangale shifted away from playing chess to focus on administration and advocacy. Between 2018 and 2022, she served as president of the Chess Association of Malawi (CHESSAM). In 2023, Namangale established Dadaz Chess Academy, a chess school in Lilongwe, which had enrolled 110 students by 2025. She also expanded the school to include a shelter for street children where they could learn chess while being provided meals of nsima.

In 2024, Namangale was named as the global head of the Gift of Chess, a non-profit organisation that aims to distribute one million chessboards by 2030. As of 2025, she serves as the leader of regional zone 4.5 of the International Chess Federation, covering ten countries in southern Africa. Namangale was the first and only female chess federation president in Africa. In addition, she is a member of FIDE's planning and development commission. She organised and led FIDE's 2025 African Congress, held in Lilongwe.

Namangale served two terms as a board member of the Malawi National Council of Sports before resigning in 2025 due to her decision to run in the 2025 Malawian general election. Namangale announced she would challenge the incumbent member of parliament for Nkhotakota Central constituency, Peter Mazizi, for the Malawi Congress Party nomination. Her platform focused on development, accountability and youth engagement in Nkhotakota.

Namangale has led initiatives to introduce chess to disadvantaged and isolated groups in Malawi. This has included Chess in Schools, which has established chess clubs in 150 schools across the country, including Namangale's former primary school in Chombo. The Chess for Freedom programme focused on using chess as a tool for rehabilitation in Malawian prisons.

In 2026, Namangale unsuccessfully ran as a candidate for vice president of FIDE, placing fifth. Her campaign was notably not endorsed by CHESSAM's president, Mpilo Mzire. Later that year, she ran as a candidate in CHESSAM's presidential election against Mzire, but dropped out on the eve of the election in October 2026.

== Recognition ==
Namangale was named best administrator at the National Sports Awards from the Malawi National Council of Sports for three consecutive years, and also won the Sport Council's chairman's excellency award. In 2024, she won the Best Executed Programme Award for the Chess in Schools initiative. She has served as a representative of the Sports Council.
