= Tolu Olukayode Odugbemi =

Nigerian academics

Tolu Olukayode Odugbemi OON

9th Vice chancellor of the University of Lagos
- In office 2007–2010
- Preceded by: Oyewusi Ibidapo-Obe
- Succeeded by: Babatunde Adetokunbo Sofoluwe

Personal details
- Born: 30 January 1945 (age 81) Ado-Ekiti, Southern Region, British Nigeria (now in Ekiti State, Nigeria)
- Party: Non-Partisan

Tolu Olukayode Odugbemi NNOM, OON (born 30 January 1945) is a Nigerian professor of Medical Microbiology, educational administrator and former vice chancellor of the University of Lagos, Nigeria. He was the 9th vice chancellor of the University of Lagos.

== Education ==
He had his elementary education at Emmanuel Primary School, Ado-Ekiti and St Stephen's Primary school in Ekiti State . He attended Christ's School Ado Ekiti (1958– 1964) for his secondary education. He had his Bachelor of science (B.Sc) degree in Microbiology and MB;BS degree from the University of Lagos.

He obtained his Doctorate degree (Ph.D) from the University of Sheffield School of Medicine in 1978 and a Doctor of Medicine (MD) degree in 1982.

He is also a Fellow of the West African College of Physicians (FWACP (Lab.Med.)), Fellow National Postgraduate Medical College of Nigeria (FMCPath) and Fellow Royal College of Pathologists (FRCPath), U.K

== Life and career ==
He started his academic career in College of Medicine, University of Lagos and rose through the ranks to be appointed Professor of Medical Microbiology and Parasitology in 1983. He was also Honorary Consultant Medical Microbiologist to the Lagos University Teaching Hospital (LUTH). At various times he was Honorary Lecturer, University of Sheffield (1976–1978), Guest Researcher, U.S Centers for Disease Control (CDC) (1982–1983) and Foundation Professor and Head of Medical Microbiology, University of Ilorin (1983–1985). He also served as the Chairman of the Nigerian Association of Colleges of Medicine (1998–2000). He also served was the President and Chairman Board of the National Postgraduate Medical College, Nigeria. and Vice-Chancellor, Ondo State University of Science and Technology (2010–2015). Since 2019, he's a Member of Board of Trustees of the Nigerian Academy of Medicine.

== Awards and honors ==
- Nigerian National Order of Merit Award (2007)
- Officer of the Order of the Niger Award (2008)
- Honorary Doctor of Science Degree, University of Sheffield (2011)
- Fellow of the Nigerian Academy of Science (1997)
- Fellowship of the Nigerian Academy of Medicine

== See also ==
- Oyewusi Ibidapo Obe
- List of vice chancellors in Nigeria
- University of Lagos
