= Chess in Africa =

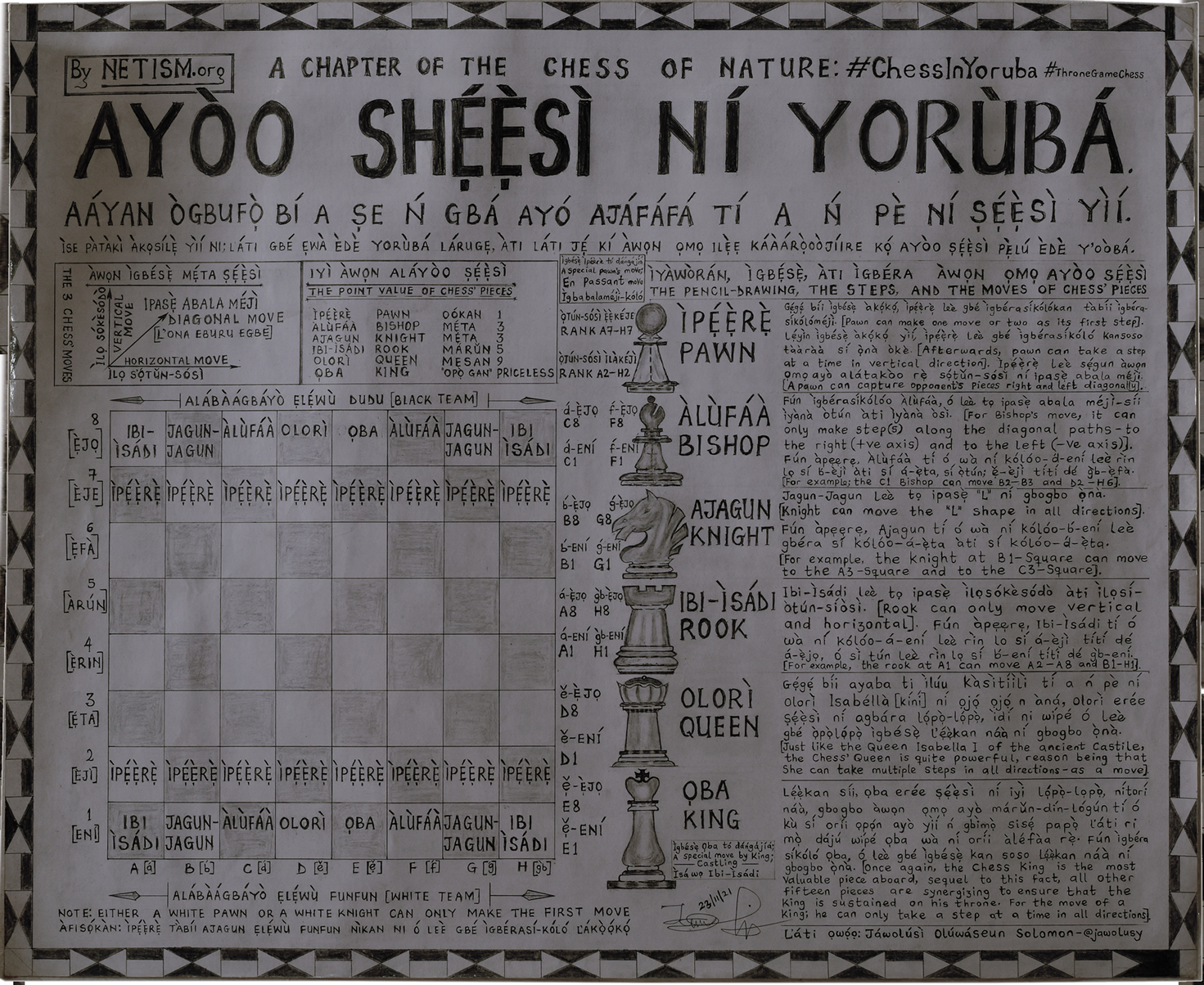
Rules of chess in Yoruba

The game of chess has a history of being played in the continent of Africa. Its play in South Africa is of particular interest to chess writers and historians.

The board game senet preceded chess and was favored by Ancient Egyptian royalty. Chess is thought to have first made its way to Africa through shatranj. As the Muslim conquest of Persia occurred, the Muslims took and modified chatrang, adopting it as shatranj. Shatranj is recognized as the immediate predecessor to chess. While chess in Europe has received considerable more attention by chess historians, it is thought that the game made its way to Europe from the Moors of North Africa.

In 1998, the African Chess Championship began being held. The most recent edition held in 2022 saw Egyptian players dominate. Since 2003, chess has also been played at the African Games. To date, Africa has 15 grandmasters.

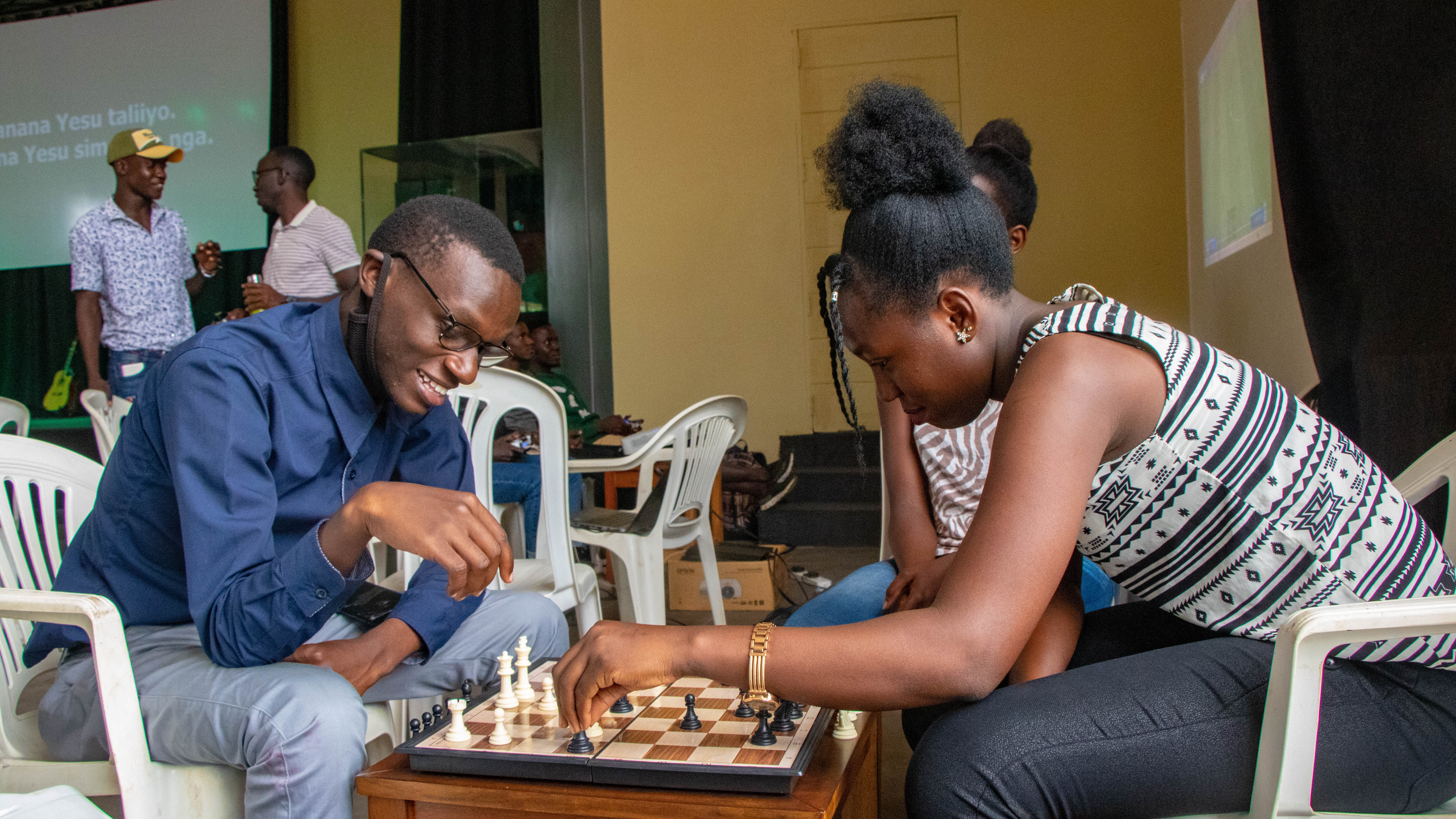
Chess being played in Uganda

== History ==
Several ancestors of chess, such as senet in Ancient Egypt, and Shatranj, were popular in Northern Africa, and it is thought that chess reached Europe through related games played by Moors.

Senterej (Amharic: ሰንጠረዥ sänṭäräž), also known as "Ethiopian chess", is a chess variant, that was the form of chess traditionally played in Ethiopia and Eritrea. It was the last popular survival of shatranj. According to Richard Pankhurst, the game became extinct sometime after the Italian invasion of Ethiopia in the 1930s. A distinctive feature of Senterej is the opening phase – players make as many moves as they like without regard for how many moves the opponent has made; this continues until the first capture is made. Memorization of opening lines is therefore not a feature of the game. Though it was played in Abyssinia for thousands of years, its popularity waned in the 20th and 21st centuries.

=== African Chess Confederation ===
The ACC (Confédération Africaine des Echecs) was founded following the Against Chess Olympiad in 1976 in Tripoli, Libya.

This is a list of all the presidents of the confederation:

President	Country	Time
Belkadi Ridha	Tunisia	1978–1990
Emmanuel Omuku	Nigeria	1990–1994
Lakhdar Mazouz	Algeria	1994–2002
Nizzar Elhadj	Libya	2002–2006
Buthali Dalibani	Botswana	2006–2010
Lakhdar Mazouz	Algeria	2010–2014
Lewis Ncube	Zambia	2014–2022
Lopang Tshepiso	Botswana	Since 2022

As a child, Phiona Mutesi enrolled in a chess club in Katwe, Uganda in 2005. Her success in chess garnered international attention, including a 2016 Disney-produced film Queen of Katwe.

From 2014 to 2021, the continent produced six grandmasters; Algeria, Egypt, and South Africa were among the countries to be represented by a grandmaster.

After returning to his home slum in Nigeria in 2018, chess master Tunde Onakoya founded Chess in Slums Africa, a volunteer organization aiming to teach and coach chess to children of low-income communities. Also in 2018, James Kangaru of Kenya was recognized by the International Chess Federation (or FIDE) as one of the best chess coaches and became Africa's youngest FIDE instructor.

== Regional variants ==
=== Senterej ===
Sometimes called "Ethiopian Chess", Senterej has a lot in common with chess, like being played on an 8x8 board, albeit not checkered, with a similar setup.

=== Senet ===
Senet or senat (Ancient Egyptian: 𓊃𓈖𓏏𓏠, romanized: znt, lit. 'passing'; cf. Coptic ⲥⲓⲛⲉ /sinə/, 'passing, afternoon') is a board game from ancient Egypt that consists of ten or more pawns on a 30-square playing board. The earliest representation of senet is dated to c. 2620 BCE from the Mastaba of Hesy-Re, while similar boards and hieroglyphic signs are found even earlier, including in the Levant in the Early Bronze Age II period. Even though the game has a 2,000-year history in Egypt, there appears to be very little variation in terms of key components. This can be determined by studying the various senet boards that have been found by archaeologists, as well as depictions of senet being played throughout Egyptian history on places like tomb walls and papyrus scrolls. However, the game fell out of use during the Roman period, and its original rules are the subject of conjecture.

== Notable players ==
- Bassem Amin (born 1988, Rating 2622)
- Phiona Mutesi (born 1996, Rating 1774)

== See also ==
- Chess in South Africa
- Geography of chess
