= The Gift of Chess =

American chess charity

- Formation: EST December 2020
- Founder: Russell Makofsky
- Purpose: Humanitarian
- Headquarters: 308 West 46th Street, New York, New York, 10036
- Official language: English
- Key people: Tony Ballard (Director of Prison Outreach) Tunde Onakoya (Director of Educational Outreach) Josh Julian (Director of Refugee Outreach) Susan Namangale (Global Head of The Gift of Chess)
- Affiliations: United Nations
- Staff: 30 Ambassadors
- Volunteers: 1000+
- Website: https://www.thegiftofchess.org

The Gift of Chess is a US based 501(c)(3) federally recognized charity based in New York City.

== History ==
The Gift of Chess was founded by Russell Makofsky, Tyrone Davis III and Ryan Rodrigues during the height of the COVID-19 pandemic to provide 10,000 NYC public school students access to their own chess set to help them reconnect physically in their own communities during a period of extreme isolation. In March of 2022, Tyrone traveled on his Spring Break from MIT, taking a commercial flight from LaGuardia Airport to Lagos, Nigeria with 500 chess sets to meet Tunde Onakoya, The Founder of Chess in the Slums Africa. Chess sets were distributed across Lagos, most notably to children in Makoko.

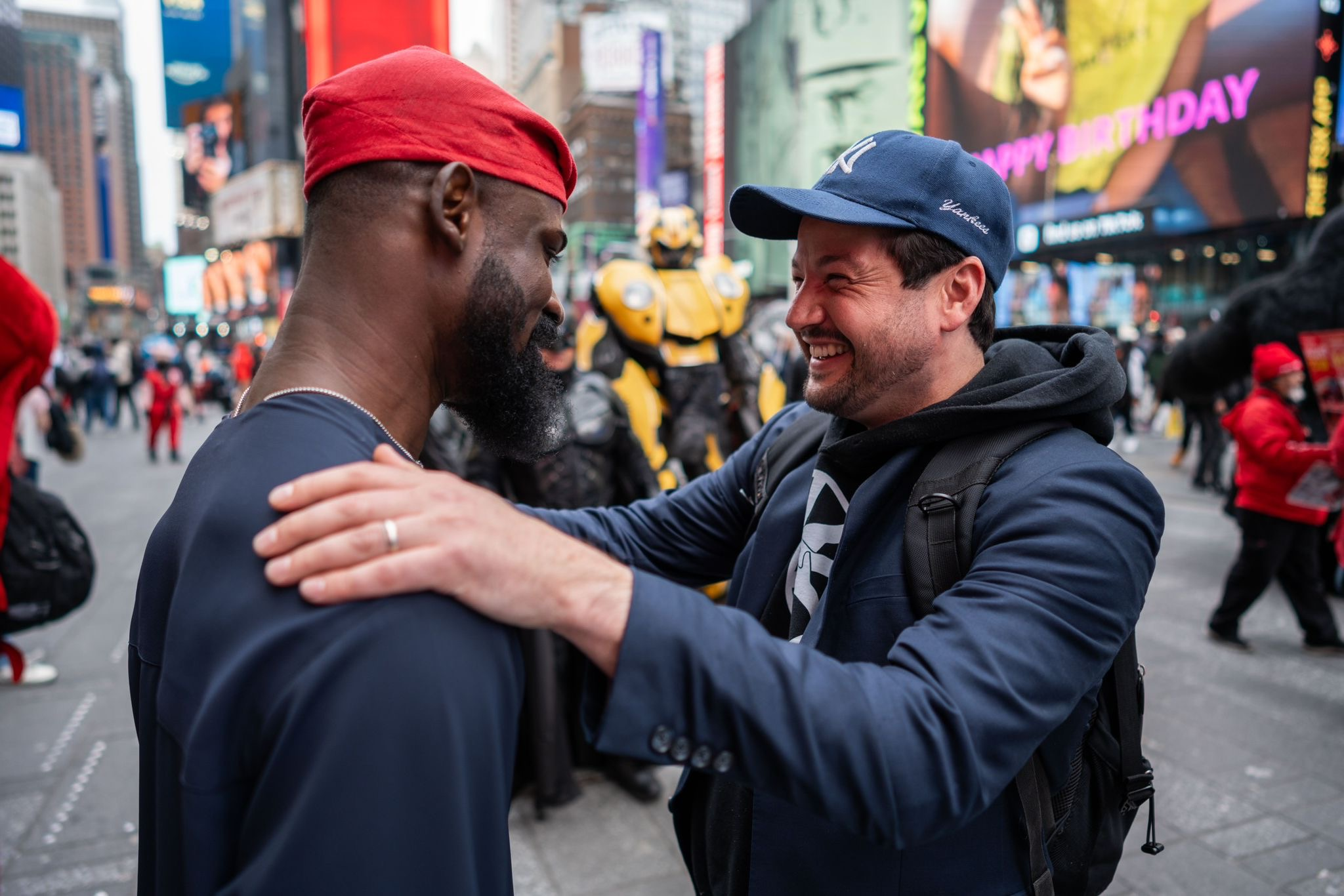
Tunde Onakoya & Russell Makofsky

Several months later, 5,000 additional chess sets were sent to Africa reaching both Nigeria (3,000 sets) and Kenya (2,000 sets). From there 1,000 chess sets reached into Ghana and Uganda though assigned Ambassadors. Over 2023, 50,000 additional chess sets have been sent to Africa, being warehoused in both Accra, Ghana and Nairobi, Kenya. From these distribution hubs, 25 countries have received 1,000 chess sets through their local assigned ambassador. These sets are given to schools, prisons, orphanages, and community centers in batches of 5 chess sets each. In 2023 Susan Namangale from Malawi was named The Global Head.

Countries reached include United States, Kenya, Uganda, Ghana, Nigeria, Senegal, Ivory Coast, Gambia, South Sudan, Somalia, Tanzania, Zambia, Malawi, Botswana, The Congo, Rwanda, Lesotho, Liberia, Ethiopia, Gabon, Togo, Eswatini, Namibia, Seychelles, Mozambique, South Africa, Zimbabwe. The Gift of Chess has also donated 100 chess sets to each partner country's FIDE chess federation.

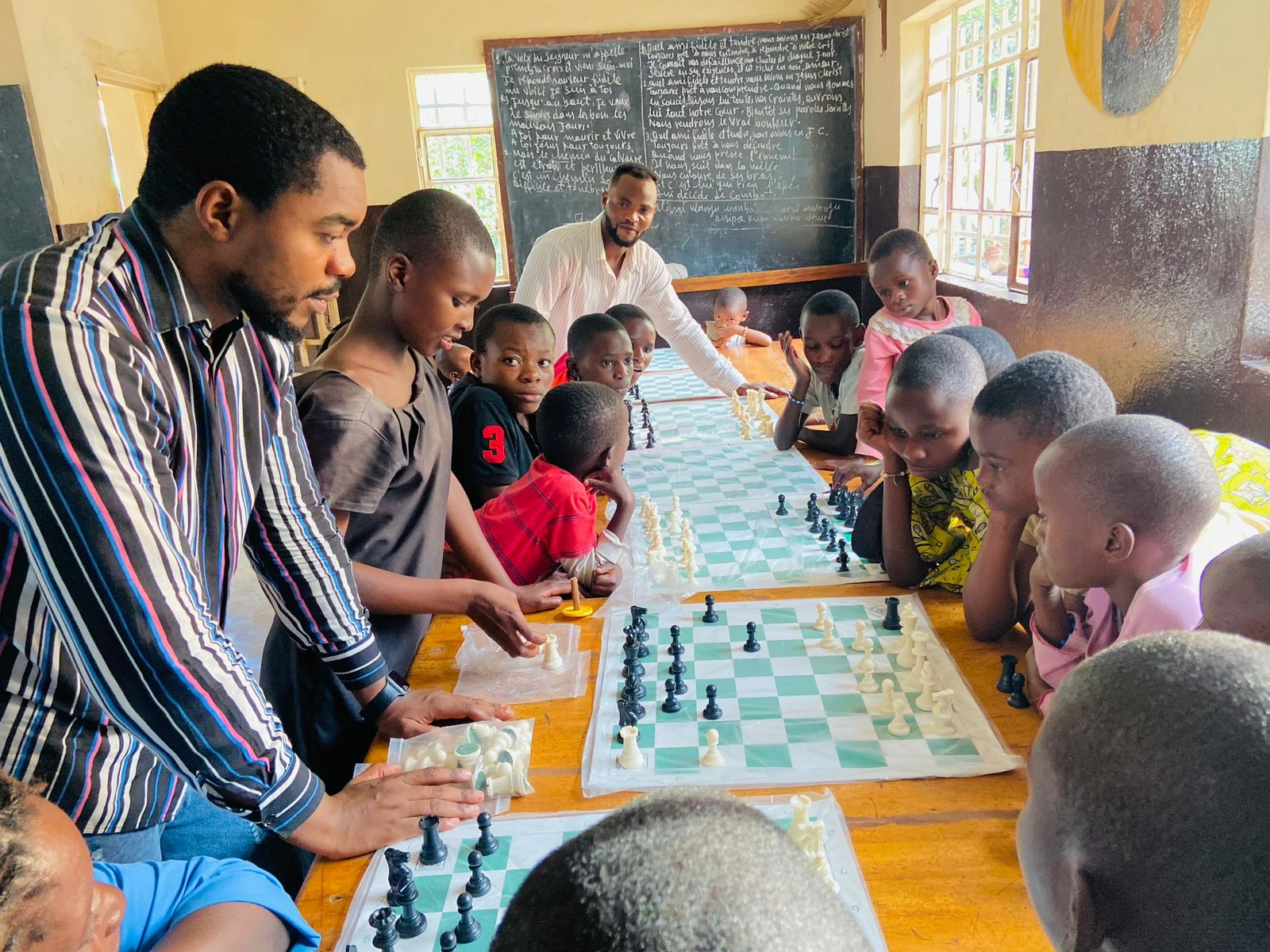
Children At Gift of Chess

In May of 2024, 41,000 chess sets are planned to reach Panama for distribution across all of Central, South and Latin America.
