= Ademola Adenle =

Nigerian sustainability scholar

Ademola A. Adenle
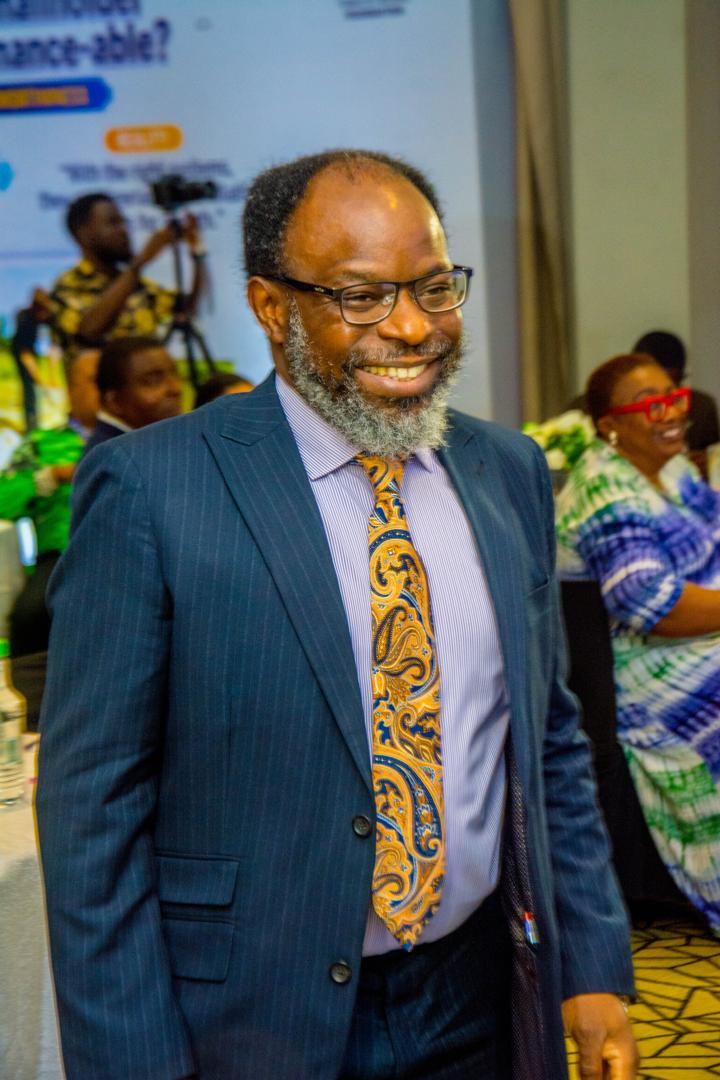
- Ademola A. Adenle
- Education: University of Lagos; University of Sussex; University of Nottingham; University of Oxford
- Known for: Sustainability Science, Agricultural Innovation, GMO Policy, Climate Change Adaptation
- Awards: The World Academy of Science Award for Food and Peace (2025)

Professor Ademola Adelowo Adenle is a Nigerian interdisciplinary scholar, food security expert, and figure in sustainability science and innovation management. He has nearly three decades of professional experience spanning academia, as well as sustainable development research and teaching. His work involves sustainable agriculture, food security, climate change adaptation, renewable energy, public health, and innovation systems, addressing development challenges in Africa. He currently serves as Senior Special Adviser on Agricultural Innovation at the Federal Ministry of Agriculture and Food Security. In 2025, he became the first laureate of the inaugural TWAS–M.S. Swaminathan Award for Food and Peace.

== Academic and professional career ==
Adenle has held teaching and research positions in the United Kingdom, the United States, Japan, Germany, and Nigeria, including at Covenant University. He has served as Guest Professor of Sustainability Science and Innovation Policy at the Technical University of Denmark.

He was a competitively selected fellow at the United Nations University Institute for the Advanced Study of Sustainability (UNU-IAS) in Japan, where he worked for more than four years as principal investigator, research fellow, and member of the teaching faculty. At UNU-IAS he led research on biosafety and governance of genetically modified organisms (GMOs) in Africa and contributed to the development of the Fibre–Feed–Food (F3) analytical framework.

== Research ==
Prof. Adenle's research has addressed the following areas:

- Genetically modified agriculture: He led a study in GM agriculture resulting in development of F-3 framework to adopt GM products across Africa.
- Climate change adaptation: He led a study on climate change adaptations in Africa.
- Agricultural policy: He also led the first Nigeria National Agricultural Soil Management Policy through the USAID Feed the Future programme.

== Awards and recognition ==
- In 2025 Prof. Adenle received the inaugural World Academy of Sciences–M.S. Swaminathan Award for Food and Peace, presented by Prime Minister Narendra Modi in New Delhi.
- In 2020, he was selected as a laureate of the Next Einstein Forum (NEF).
- In 2022 he was the only African recipient of the Sustainability Carbon Neutrality Award.
- In 2023 he was a Rockefeller Food Systems finalist.
- In 2024 he was elected a Fellow of the African Academy of Sciences.

Following the 2025 award, President Bola Tinubu received him at the State House in Abuja and the National Orientation Agency named him "Nigerian of the Week".

== Publications ==
Adenle has authored more than 70 peer-reviewed publications. His work has appeared in journals including Nature Biotechnology, World Development, Ecological Economics, Energy Policy, and Food Policy. He has also published edited volumes with Cambridge University Press (2017) and Oxford University Press (2020).

=== Selected journal articles ===
- Adenle, Ademola A.; Morris, E. Jane; Parayil, Govindan (December 2013). "Status of development, regulation and adoption of GM agriculture in Africa: Views and positions of stakeholder groups". Food Policy. 43: 159–166. doi:10.1016/j.foodpol.2013.09.006.
- Adenle, Ademola A. (April 2014). "Stakeholders' Perceptions of GM Technology in West Africa: Assessing the Responses of Policymakers and Scientists in Ghana and Nigeria". Journal of Agricultural and Environmental Ethics. 27 (2): 241–263. Bibcode:2014JAEE...27..241A. doi:10.1007/s10806-013-9462-y.
- Adenle, Ademola A; Aworh, Ogugua C; Akromah, Richard; Parayil, Govindan (December 2012). "Developing GM super cassava for improved health and food security: future challenges in Africa". Agriculture & Food Security. 1 (1) 11. Bibcode:2012AgFS....1...11A. doi:10.1186/2048-7010-1-11.
- Adenle, Ademola A.; Ford, James D.; Morton, John; Twomlow, Stephen; Alverson, Keith; Cattaneo, Andrea; Cervigni, Rafaello; Kurukulasuriya, Pradeep; Huq, Saleemul; Helfgott, Ariella; Ebinger, Jane O. (November 2017). "Managing Climate Change Risks in Africa - A Global Perspective". Ecological Economics. 141: 190–201. Bibcode:2017EcoEc.141..190A. doi:10.1016/j.ecolecon.2017.06.004. hdl:10986/29446.
- Adenle, Ademola A.; Manning, Dale T.; Arbiol, Joseph (December 2017). "Mitigating Climate Change in Africa: Barriers to Financing Low-Carbon Development". World Development. 100: 123–132. doi:10.1016/j.worlddev.2017.07.033.
- Adenle, Ademola A; Morris, E Jane; Murphy, Denis J; Phillips, Peter W B; Trigo, Eduardo; Kearns, Peter; Li, Yun-He; Quemada, Hector; Falck-Zepeda, José; Komen, John (February 2018). "Rationalizing governance of genetically modified products in developing countries". Nature Biotechnology. 36 (2): 137–139. doi:10.1038/nbt.4069. PMID 29406500.
- Adenle, Ademola A. (February 2020). "Assessment of solar energy technologies in Africa-opportunities and challenges in meeting the 2030 agenda and sustainable development goals". Energy Policy. 137 111180. Bibcode:2020EnPol.13711180A. doi:10.1016/j.enpol.2019.111180.
- Adenle, Ademola A.; Manning, Louise; Azadi, Hossein (January 2017). "Agribusiness innovation: A pathway to sustainable economic growth in Africa". Trends in Food Science & Technology. 59: 88–104. doi:10.1016/j.tifs.2016.11.008.
- Adenle, Ademola A. (10 April 2017). "Building the African economy: Is President Obama's entrepreneurial public management program sustainable in Africa?". Journal of Entrepreneurship and Public Policy. 6 (1): 92–107. doi:10.1108/JEPP-12-2015-0036.
- Adenle, Ademola A.; Stevens, Casey; Bridgewater, Peter (January 2015). "Global conservation and management of biodiversity in developing countries: An opportunity for a new approach". Environmental Science & Policy. 45: 104–108. Bibcode:2015ESPol..45..104A. doi:10.1016/j.envsci.2014.10.002.

=== Selected books ===
- Adenle, Ademola A.; Morris, E. Jane; Murphy, Denis J., eds. (2017). Genetically Modified Organisms in Developing Countries. Cambridge University Press. ISBN 978-1-107-15191-8.
- Adenle, Ademola A.; Chertow, Marian R.; Moors, Ellen H. M.; Pannell, David J., eds. (2020). Science, Technology, and Innovation for Sustainable Development Goals. doi:10.1093/oso/9780190949501.001.0001. ISBN 978-0-19-094950-1.
