= Fola David =

Nigerian doctor and visual artist

Adefemi Gbadamosi
- Born: 1993-09-05
- Other names: Fola David
- Education: University of Lagos, Nigeria.
- Occupation: Medical doctor

Adefemi Gbadamosi (born 5 September 1993) also known as Fola David, is a Nigerian medical doctor who doubles as a visual and hyper-realism artist.

== Works ==
He does speed painting which involves painting people on stage while the canvas is upside down or spinning.

He has worked on canvas for Ooni of Ife Adeyeye Enitan Ogunwusi, Patoranking, Trey Songz, Wale, Keri Hilson, R-kelly, Jidenna, 2face, Iyanya, Dj Jimmy Jatt, Alibaba among others.

To campaign against the social stereotypes of skin disorders his works covers skin imperfections like wrinkles, vitiligo, freckles, stretch marks, ichthyosis and other skin conditions. He raises awareness on medical issues through Fola David Foundation. In November 2024, Fola started Evvdee Art Academy to bridge identified gaps in art.

== Education ==
He holds a degree in Medicine and Surgery from the College of Medicine, University of Lagos.

== Guinness World Record ==
On July 16, 2024, Fola started his attempt to create the world's largest drawing by an individual. The artwork, titled "The Unity of Diversity," was produced on a 1,004.7 m^{2} (10,814.5 ft^{2}) canvas at the Mobolaji Johnson Arena in Lagos. The drawing features a map of Nigeria, highlighting the nation's diverse cultures. The painting was concluded on July 21, 2024.

On November 14, 2024, Guinness World Records officially recognized "The Unity of Diversity" as the largest drawing by an individual. This achievement surpassed the previous record of 629.98 square meters held by Indian artist Ravi Soni.

== Recognition ==
He was nominated for The Future Awards Africa Prize For Art & Culture in 2017. He also spoke at TEDxBellsTech at Bells University in 2018.

== Awards ==
He won The Future Awards Africa Prize for Young Person of the Year in 2025.
