= Akinpelu Oludele Adesola =

5th Vice chancellor of the University of Lagos
- In office 1981–1988
- Preceded by: Babatunde Kwaku Adadevoh
- Succeeded by: Nurudeen Oladapo Alao

Personal details
- Born: 6 November 1927
- Died: 29 May 2010 (aged 82)
- Party: Non-Partisan

Akinpelu Oludele Adesola (6 November 1927 – 29 May 2010) was a Nigerian professor of Surgery, educational administrator and former vice chancellor of the University of Lagos.

His father was Chief Bamgboye Fasina Adesola MBE, (Bariyun of Isaga and Bajito of Ibara, Abeokuta). In 1935 he joined Saint Jude's School in Ebute-Metta, Lagos where he was actively involved in the Sunday School Choir. The Adesola household which had a strong Christian foundation was filled with music lovers who enjoyed, played and sang church hymns.

== See also ==
- Babatunde Kwaku Adadevoh
- List of vice chancellors in Nigeria
- University of Lagos
