= Lagos University Teaching Hospital =

Lagos University Teaching Hospital (LUTH)

Geography
- Location: Idi-Araba, Lagos State, Lagos, Nigeria
- Coordinates: 6.517677°N 3.353772°E

Organisation
- Care system: Public
- Type: Teaching
- Affiliated university: University of Lagos College of Medicine.

Services
- Emergency department: Yes
- Beds: 950

History
- Founded: 1962

Links
- Website: www.luth.gov.ng
- Lists: Hospitals in Nigeria

Lagos University Teaching Hospital (LUTH) is a tertiary hospital established in 1962 and is located in Idi-Araba, Surulere, Lagos State, Nigeria. The teaching hospital is affiliated with the University of Lagos College of Medicine. The University of Lagos College of Medicine educates students, while LUTH provides them with practical experience through placements and internships.

== Management ==
As of 2023, the chief medical director of the hospital is Professor Wasiu Lanre Adeyemo. Ms. Omolola Olubukunola Fakeye serves as the director of administration, while Dr. Ayodeji Oluwole is the chairman, medical advisory committee.

=== Locations ===
There are four locations of LUTH located through Lagos State. The main campus is located in Idi-Arabia, with the supplementary and specialist clinics located elsewhere. The locations of LUTH are as follows:

- LUTH Main Campus, Idi-Araba
- LUTH Dermatology Clinic, Yaba
- LUTH PHC, Pakoto, Ogun State
- LUTH Psychiatry Clinic, Yaba

=== Departments ===
LUTH has eight major departments. Within these departments, there are sub-departments and specialist units. The main departments are:

1. Dentistry
2. Internal medicine
3. Obstetrics and Gynecology
4. Laboratory medicine
5. Pediatrics
6. Oncology
7. Surgery
8. Allied Services

=== Non clinical departments ===
1. Chief Medical Director's Office
2. Chairman Medical Advisory Committees Office
3. Director of Administration's Office
4. Audit Department
5. Clinical Services And Training Division
6. Corporate Services
7. Corporate Social Investment
8. Engineering Services
9. Finance And Accounts
10. General Administration Division
11. Hospital Facilities Management
12. Human Resources Management Division
13. Legal Services Department
14. Printing Unit
15. Procurement Department
16. Protocol Unit
17. Security Unit
18. Servicom Unit
19. Staff Development, Training And Welfare
20. Stores Department.

== Description ==
LUTH is the largest teaching hospital in Nigeria, with 761 beds. It serves about 25 million people in Lagos State. The teaching hospital trains students of the University of Lagos College of Medicine in the medical, dental, pharmacology and other departments.

== Facilities and units ==
=== Intensive care unit (ICU) ===
One of the main facilities within the Lagos University Teaching Hospital is the intensive care unit, which was established in September 1963. The unit serves as the first line of care for patients with serious to life-threatening conditions or injuries. It is a compact 10-bed unit. This number has significantly grown since a study conducted between 1963 and 1973 where the teaching hospital had constantly fluctuating and low numbers due to high staff turnover. Some of the most common conditions treated in the ICU unit include severe tetanus, neurological conditions, burn injuries, and obstetric conditions.

=== Neonatal unit ===
The neonatal unit is located within the LUTH Department of Pediatrics. It has a capacity of 80 newborns. On the average, the neonatal unit handles about 2500 deliveries per year. The unit also has a referral rate of 200 per month for cases beyond LUTH's capabilities. The neonatal unit has two postnatal wards and a labour ward with 14 rooms and two theaters. Within the postnatal ward, there are two sections, the inborn section for babies born within LUTH and the out born ward for babies transferred from other facilities. Both sub-wards can accommodate up to 40 babies. The neonatal facility also has a section dedicated to assisting women with conception.

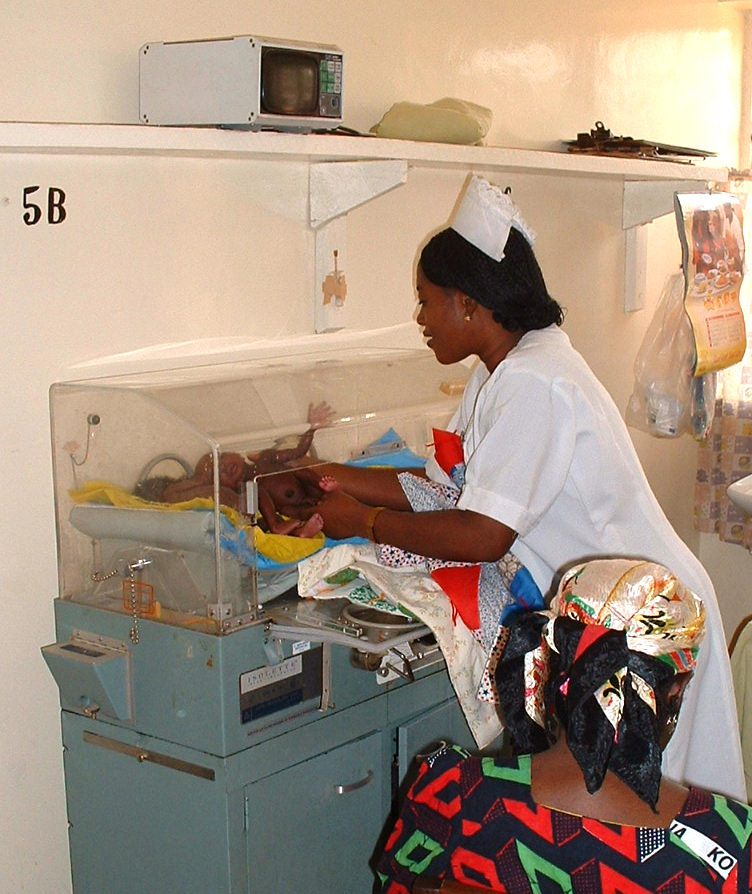
Example of Neonatal Incubator

The equipment available on the neonatal unit are incubators, phototherapy devices including bilirubinometer and irradiometer machines, multiparameter monitors, pulse oximeters, apnoea monitors, piped air/oxygen, blood gas analyzers, and bubble CPAP machine with blenders and high-flow facility. The neonatal unit also has access to pharmaceuticals, microbiology facilities and a chemistry laboratory, social welfare facilities and pathology for blood examination.

The staff composition at the neonatal unit is made up of consultant neonatologists, doctors, internal house officers, nurses and other support staff. As of 2020 there are four neonatologists, 10 resident doctors, 26 nurses and eight support staff.

Delivery admission rates (2018)

Type	Amount (babies)
Delivery rate (Annual)	2400
Admission rate (monthly)	70–80
Referral rate (monthly)	150 (neonatals)

=== NSIA-LUTH Cancer Treatment Centre ===
In 2015 the Cancer Treatment Centre located in the Oncology and Radiotherapy department underwent renovations to improve the facility. According to the US Trade and Development Agency (USDTA), there are 115,000 new cancer patients known to medical services requiring treatment in Nigeria every year. Cancer Aware Nigeria oversaw the project to improve LUTH's equipment and reopened the facility in December 2015. The project was in partnership with the Nigeria Sovereign Investment Authority (NSIA). It cost approximately US$11 million. The refurbishment of the treatment center was designed to improve the unit centered on renovating patient care rooms, waiting areas and the overall appearance of the clinic. This was done to increase the number of patients using the clinic, as well as their experience. The project had six major aims. These were to provide "internal and external radiotherapy services", service over 3000 patients, provide the facilities to train extra staff, improve the waiting time to receive treatment, help to fund the development of LUTH and finally reduce the number of patients having to travel overseas to find medical attention.

President Muhammad Buhari, who commissioned the refurbishment of the Cancer Treatment Centre commented on 9 February 2019; "Today’s commissioning, is in part, the fulfilment of our commitment to Nigerians for quality, affordable and accessible healthcare". The CEO of NSIA also remarked that the Cancer Treatment Centre would service LUTH by improving "economic potential of healthcare investments in Nigeria" and it would "increase private sector participation".

USTDA was also involved in the process of improving the Cancer treatment Centre. USDTA purchased Varian cancer treatment and detection software such as the Halcyon. This software was designed to "improve patient capacity and treatment precision". The software also was designed to reduce the use of water and electricity by half through its precision. The treatment center also was re-equipped with new technology. These included three linear Accelerators, brachytherapy machine and treatment planning systems.

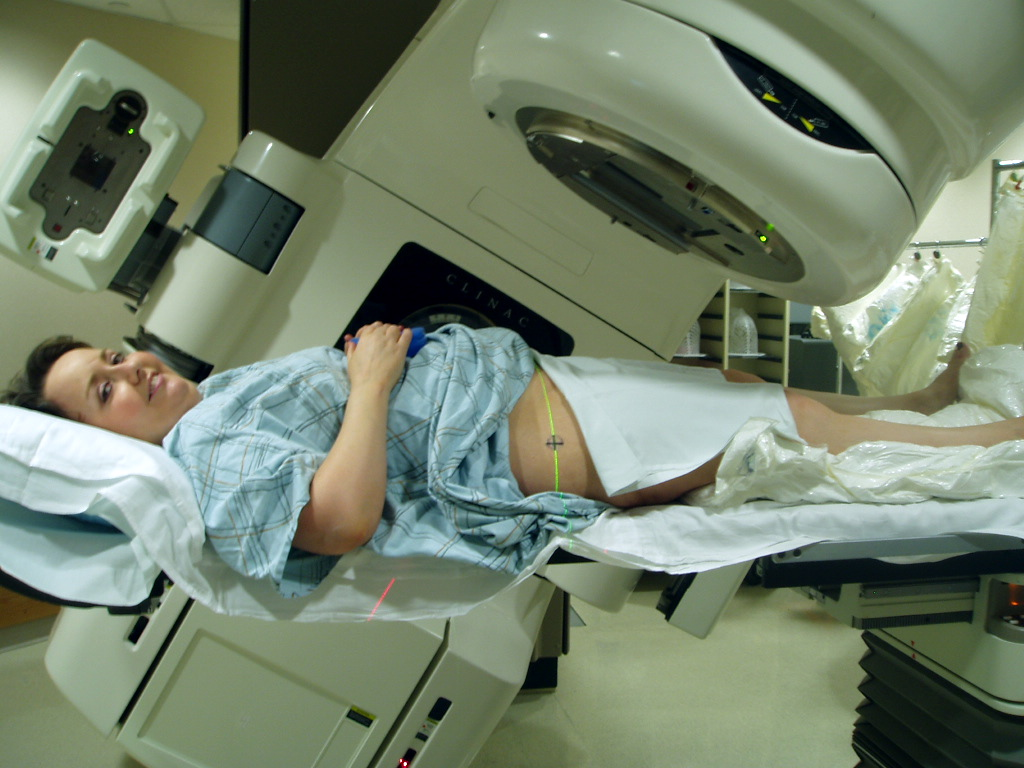
Example of external beam radiation therapy

The treatments that are available at the Cancer Treatment Centre are:

- Radiotherapy: External beam radiation therapy and internal beam radiation therapy
- Chemotherapy
- Pharmacy treatments.

On 27 December 2018, representatives of The Guardian visited the Cancer Treatment Centre and were advised that equipment such as linear accelerators, brachytherapy machines, magnetic resonance imaging (MRI Scanners) and CT scans were due to be installed in the centre.

== History ==
The Commission on post-secondary education in Nigeria was established by the Nigerian Federal Minister of Education in April 1959, and was conducted by Sir Ashby. It was designed to "conduct an investigation into Nigeria’s needs in the field of post-school certificate and higher education over the next twenty years". Cabinet decision determined that improvements needed to be made to Nigeria's health and medical industry. The commission investigated how Nigeria can improve in this field, tours of communities with the intent to collect oral advice from individuals associated with the health industry were undertaken. Some of these people included employers of labor, public service commissions and governors. The investigation concluded that "teaching staff of proper quality is the first step in any effort to train skilled manpower".

LUTH was established to raise the experience and training of medical staff in Nigeria to raise the standard of the medical industry in general. The goal to train 100 doctors annually in medical schools in Nigeria from 1975 was established. It started in 1961 with 330 beds, and today that number has risen to 761.

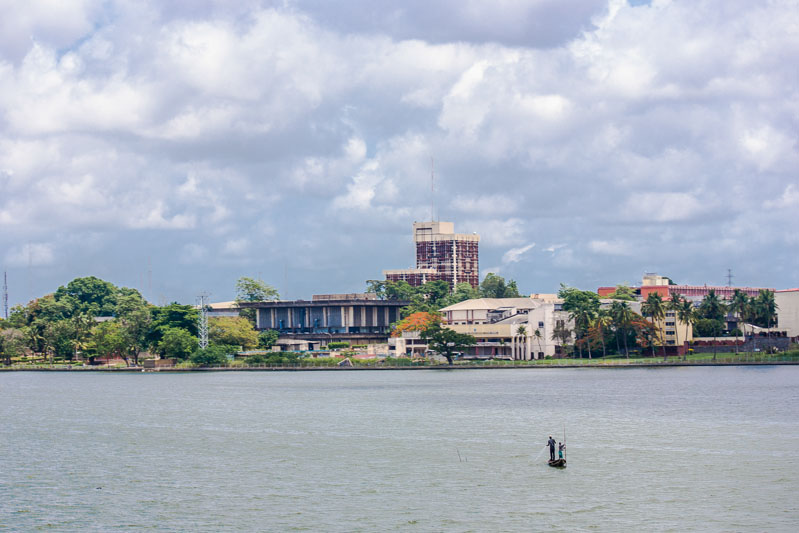
University of Lagos

== Education ==
The partnership between the College of Medicine of the University of Lagos and Lagos University Teaching Hospital provides several degrees to medical students. The most common is the Bachelor of Science. Within this degree, students specialize in physiotherapy, pharmacology, nursing, radiography, medical laboratory science, medicine and dentistry. LUTH offers both medicine and dentistry. Students can study in both these faculties which enables them to develop good experience. In 2020, the University of Lagos College of Medicine was ranked 390th in the world for Clinical Medicine.

Education within LUTH is divided up into different departments. These departments are:

- School of Nursing (SON)
- School of Medical and Psychiatry Social Work (SMPSW)
- Community Health Officers Training School (CHOTS)
- Federal School of Biomedical Engineering (FSBE) - ND
- School of Health Information Management (SHIM)
- School of Anesthetic Technician (SAT)
- School of Post Basic Nursing (SPBN)
- School of Midwifery (SOM)

== Harvard Global Health Research Projects ==
The Harvard Global Health Institute acts as a central orchestrating organization for most of the health initiatives active within the Lagos University Teaching Hospital and the wider health industry in Nigeria. Its mission is to address the most "vexing challenges in human health" by using "innovative, evidence-based, collaborative visions" in partnership with hospitals and the public health industry.

=== AIDS Prevention In Nigeria (APIN) ===
The Harvard Global Health Institute works closely with LUTH through the APIN Program, to research and investigate modern treatments for HIV/AIDS. The APIN Project is a non-governmental organization registered with the Nigerian Corporate Affairs Commission which was initiated to research and aid the prevention of HIV/AIDS. APIN stands for AIDS Prevention Initiative in Nigeria. The initiative has been running since 2000. LUTH is a supporter of the project, participating in the health initiative to improve patient care. There is also an APIN clinic located at LUTH as a part of the teaching hospital. The Harvard School of Public Health (HSPH) helps to fund the project and the first grant of $1.7 million was donated in 2008 to fast track the results of the initiative. The project states that their mission is to "provide cutting edge, innovative and sustainable approaches to address…public health" so that Nigeria may improve "program management, service delivery, capacity building, research, strategic information and advocacy in partnership with other stakeholders". The initiative now assists approximately a quarter of people with HIV in Nigeria and provides antiretroviral care to more than 266,000 patients in 570 states in Nigeria. It now has a budget of more than $120 million and is undergoing the implementation of a partnership with the US Center for Disease Control and Prevention.

=== National Institute of Health and Building Research and Innovation in Nigeria's Science (BRAINS) ===
The College of Medicine at the University of Lagos, in conjunction with LUTH collaborated with the National Institute of Health as well as APIN. The BRAINS program is designed to develop and revise the curriculum for those studying at the college of medicine and at LUTH. There are three main areas which are emphasized in the curriculum. These are: HIV research and training, community medicine and education of public health in Nigeria and finally genomics of infectious disease. The aim is to revise the infrastructure available to students so that education in these three areas can be improved. As of 2015, the funding for this project was US$641,000. The project commenced in 2015 and is ongoing.

== Energy management ==
The 5.8MW capacity independent power plant was commissioned on 7 December 2017 to secure reliable energy to the teaching hospital. The Nigerian Sovereign Investment Authority (NSIA), the organisation also behind the Cancer Development Centre, partnered with LUTH to organise the power plant, and it served as the main funder of the project. Tade Adeyeye, the head of business development at CET Power Project Ltd, headed the company supplying the independent power plant. He observed that to function seamlessly, the powerplant would be required. The chief executive officer, managing director and member of NSIA, Uche Orji, inaugurated the project. He commented that the Independent power plant would be the first of its kind in Nigeria.

"We are powering the entire LUTH community, which is a size of a village. The capacity of the plant can power a small community ensuring 24 hours supply" (Uche Orji).

The power plant incorporates a combination of gas technology and modern fire-fighting facilities to ensure its suitability and reliability for LUTH. The implementation of the power plant ensures constant power and energy to the hospital facility as well as the wider units. Reliable power will be especially useful for cancer treatment equipment, allowing it to fully functional at all times.

== Funding problems ==
=== SERAP report ===
The Social-Economic Rights and Accountability Project (SERAP) is a non-governmental organisation established in 2004 aiming to draw attention to transgressions of human rights. It uses the UDHR to encourage the Nigerian government to honour the basic needs and values of its citizens.

SERAP made public on 16 September 2018, that the conditions of LUTH were not per the spending allocations granted to the teaching hospital. SERAP addressed the minister of health, Professor Isaac Adewole asking him to "provide information about details of actual spending of allocations to the Lagos University Teaching Hospital (LUTH), Idi Araba, and other 20 federal teaching hospitals and 20 federal medical centres across the country, for the period covering 2010 to 2017". The letter noted that "despite huge budgetary allocations, many of the teaching hospitals and medical centres under the direct control of your ministry have been left to fall apart and health care facilities in many of these hospitals lack even the most basic of amenities". Further specific information regarding the condition of LUTH was provided such as the condition of amenities and infrastructure.

=== Flooding and drainage problems ===
As of 2018, the main entrance of LUTH frequently experienced flooding. This issue is partly due to the lack of funds available to upgrade the entrance to protect it from the rainy season. As a result, entry to the teaching hospital is limited.

=== Infrastructure ===
Due to insufficient funds to upgrade the building materials used at LUTH, the three-storey building has peeling paint, worn-out doors and roofing, and out-of-order amenities. However, the Accident and Emergency Unit was recently renovated and does not have these issues.

=== Over capacity ===
The SERAP report also noted that there are not sufficient waiting areas to combat the overcrowding of LUTH. For example, waiting areas for mothers in the paediatric ward were not sufficient. The same problem was noted in the gynaecology ward. Other overcrowding problems that were noted were the insufficient neonatal incubators for premature babies. Bedsheets were also noted to be in short supply.

== See also ==
- List of hospitals in Lagos
- Lagos State
- Hospitals in Nigeria
