= Chris Omoijiade =

Nigerian author

- Born: Christopher Ehinomen Omoijiade; 9 August 1982 (age 44); Lagos, Nigeria
- Education: University of Lagos, University of Hertfordshire, School of Law
- Occupations: Thought leader, author, speaker and Christian minister
- Known for: Founder and CEO of The Chris Omoijiade Company (TCOC GLOBAL)
- Website: chrisomoijiade.com

Chris Omoijiade (born August 9, 1982) is a Nigerian speaker, thought leader, author and Christian minister. He is the founder and CEO of The Chris Omoijiade Company (TCOC GLOBAL) based in Lagos, Nigeria.

== Early life and education ==
Born in Lagos, Omoijiade graduated from University of Lagos in 2005 with a Bachelor of Laws degree. He earned a Master of Laws (LLM) degree from University of Hertfordshire, School of Law, United Kingdom in 2007.

== Career ==
Omoijiade has served in various leadership capacities since he began his professional career. He serves as the Managing Partner – Lucidus Postermo Legal Practitioners. He is the founder and CEO of The Chris Omoijiade Company (TCOC GLOBAL) – a personal development, leadership, management, and innovation consultancy firm.

Through his firm Omoijiade has conducted impactful training for notable entities such as Diamonds and Pearls, Etisalat, The Nigerian Army, Corona Schools, and others.

As a Christian minister Omoijiade leads the Arimathea Believers Network and serves as the Director of Arimathea Christian Publishers. As an author, he has written books that offers practical guidance for success and wholesome living.

Omoijiade is a member of the Nigerian Bar Association, International Bar Association, Institute of Directors, and Chartered Institute of Arbitrators.

== Bibliography ==
- The Irrefutable Role of Gatekeepers To your Success & Key Principles to Win Them Over, Scribe Tribe Africa – 2024
- So you Want to Lead, Scribe Tribe Africa – 2024
- You Too can be Debt Free, Scribe Tribe Africa – 2024
- Leadership Gems in the Bible (New Testament Edition), Scribe Tribe Africa – 2024
- Leadership Gems in the Bible (Old Testament Edition) Volume 1, Scribe Tribe Africa – 2024
- Leadership Gems in the Bible (Old Testament Edition) Volume 2, Scribe Tribe Africa – 2024
- Get Ahead: Practical Steps to Face life's Realities and Embrace Success, Chris Omoijiade – 2019
