= Federal Ministry of Agriculture and Food Security (Nigeria) =

Federal Ministry of Agriculture and Food Security

The Federal Ministry of Agriculture and Food Security (FMAFS) is one of the Federal Ministries of Nigeria established to ensure food security and promote agricultural sustainability in Nigeria. The current Minister of Ministry of Agriculture and Food Security is Abubakar Kyari. He was appointed by President Bola Tinubu on 16 August 2023.

== Organisation ==
The Ministry, formerly known as the Federal Ministry of Agriculture and Rural Development (FMARD), was established in 1966. The Ministry is responsible for the formulation and implementation of policies to provide food for a growing population, supply raw materials for industry, expand markets for agricultural products, create jobs, and diversify the economy. It also coordinates various agricultural projects, supported by funding from donor partners.
