= Sylvan Ebigwei =

Nigerian medical doctor and dental surgeon

Sylvan Olisanye Ebigwei
- Born: 8 January 1943; Jos, Plateau State, Nigeria
- Died: 3 November 2023 (aged 80)
- Other name: Mr. Chess
- Education: University of Lagos Medical School at Idi-Araba, National Post Graduate Medical College, Ijaniki
- Occupations: Medical doctor, Dental surgeon, Chess promoter
- Years active: 1978–2023
- Known for: Promoting chess in Nigeria and Africa
- Spouse: Evelyn Oba (m. 1976; died 2022)
- Children: 4

Sylvan Olisanye Ebigwei (8 January 1943 – 3 November 2023) was a Nigerian medical professional, dental surgeon, and a prominent figure in the advancement of chess in Nigeria and Africa. Often referred to as "Mr. Chess," Ebigwei was instrumental in the formation of the Nigerian Chess Federation and was a founding member of the African Chess Confederation.

== Early life and education ==
Ebigwei was born in Jos, Plateau State, Nigeria. After losing his mother at just eight months old, he moved to Okpanam, Delta State. He began his education at Saint Michael's Catholic School and later attended Saint Patrick's College, Asaba. Ebigwei was an exceptional student, eventually gaining admission to the University of Lagos Medical School at Idi-Araba, where he graduated in 1974. Following this, he pursued post-graduate training in General Dental Practice at the National Post Graduate Medical College, Ijaniki, obtaining his fellowship.

== Career ==
=== Medical ===
During his medical training, Ebigwei met Evelyn Oba, whom he later married. Together, they raised four children and established a dental practice named EVOLIS, a combination of both their names. Ebigwei acquired expertise in Dental Implantology, Crown & Bridge Prosthesis from the University of Florida and the Academy of General Dentistry, Orlando. Ebigwei was a member of Nigeria Dental Association, the Guild of Medical Practitioners of Nigeria, and the National Postgraduate Medical College of Nigeria.

=== Chess sport ===
Ebigwei's passion for the Chess game led to his significant contributions to the growth and popularization of chess in Nigeria and across Africa. In 1975, Ebigwei, alongside Grand Master Raymond King (OBE) of England, spearheaded the formation of the Nigerian Chess Federation, with Ebigwei assuming the role of the first organizing secretary and Pius Okigbo as president. Ebigwei served as the inaugural chairman of the Nigerian Chess Association (NCF) and subsequently ascended to the presidency of the Nigerian Chess Federation in 1977. He initiated the establishment of the Commonwealth Chess Association. During the World Chess Congress in Buenos Aires in 1978, he advocated for the admission of Libya into the World Chess Federation.

=== Politics ===
Ebigwei was instrumental in the establishment of the Peoples Democratic Party (PDP) of Nigeria. Additionally, he once served as the Vice President of Ohanaeze Ndigbo, an Igbo socio-cultural organization in Nigeria. Similarly, he held leadership positions in Aka Ikenga, Lagos, an Igbo think-tank, serving as president and later rising to the position of Vice President General. He was also adorned with the esteemed position of Iyase (Prime Minister) in his hometown.

== Awards ==
- 2023 - "Nigerian Patriotic Award" by the Ambassadors for Peace and Enlightenment Foundation, (AMPEF), a human rights organization.

== Death ==
Dr Ebigwei's life journey came to a close on 3 November 2023. He is survived by his children Chichi Spruel, Sylvia Oba, Awele Omeda and Joshua Ebigwei.
