= Eniola Abioro =

Nigerian fashion model (born 1999)

- Born: 10 July 1999 (age 26); Ogun State, Nigeria
- Occupation: Model
- Modeling information
- Height: 1.75 m (5 ft 9 in)
- Hair color: Brown
- Eye color: Brown
- Agency: Next Management (worldwide); Uno Models (Barcelona); Modelwerk (Hamburg); Few Models (Lagos) (mother agency)

Eniola Abioro (born 10 July 1999) is a Nigerian fashion model. She is the first Nigerian model to walk for Prada.

== Early life ==
Abioro is the middle child in her family; she has an older brother and a younger sister. She worked as a kindergarten teacher at a school called Grace Academy in Lagos, Nigeria. A local agency proprietor discovered her and convinced her family to let her pursue a career in modeling.

== Career ==
Abioro signed with Next Management and debuted as a Prada exclusive in 2018. She walked the runway for Versace, Giambattista Valli, Tommy Hilfiger, Off-White, Miu Miu, Saint Laurent, Paco Rabanne and Loewe, Salvatore Ferragamo and Altuzarra. She has also walked for Jason Wu and modeled for Revlon, Fenty Beauty, Calvin Klein and Tiffany and Co. After her first season, models.com listed her as a "Top Newcomer", and as one of their "Top 50" models.

Abioro has appeared in editorials for Vogue, Harper's Bazaar, Vogue Italia, WSJ and Elle.
