= Nurudeen Oladapo Alao =

Nigerian academic

6th Vice chancellor of the University of Lagos
- In office 1988–1995
- Preceded by: Akinpelu Oludele Adesola
- Succeeded by: Jelili Adebisi Omotola

Personal details
- Party: Non-Partisan

Nurudeen Oladapo Alao is a Nigerian professor of geography, educational administrator and former vice chancellor of the University of Lagos.

== Biography ==
He obtained his first degree, a Bachelor of Arts from the University of Ibadan, Ibadan, Oyo State Nigeria. He earned a Master of Arts and Doctor of philosophy degree from Northwestern University.

He was appointed vice chancellor of the University of Lagos in 1988 after the tenure of professor Akinpelu Oludele Adesola. He was succeeded by professor Jelili Adebisi Omotola in 1995.

== See also ==
- Jelili Adebisi Omotola
- List of vice chancellors in Nigeria
