= Abraham Osinubi =

Nigerian medical doctor, anatomist, academic administrator, and strategist

Abraham Adewale Adepoju Osinubi
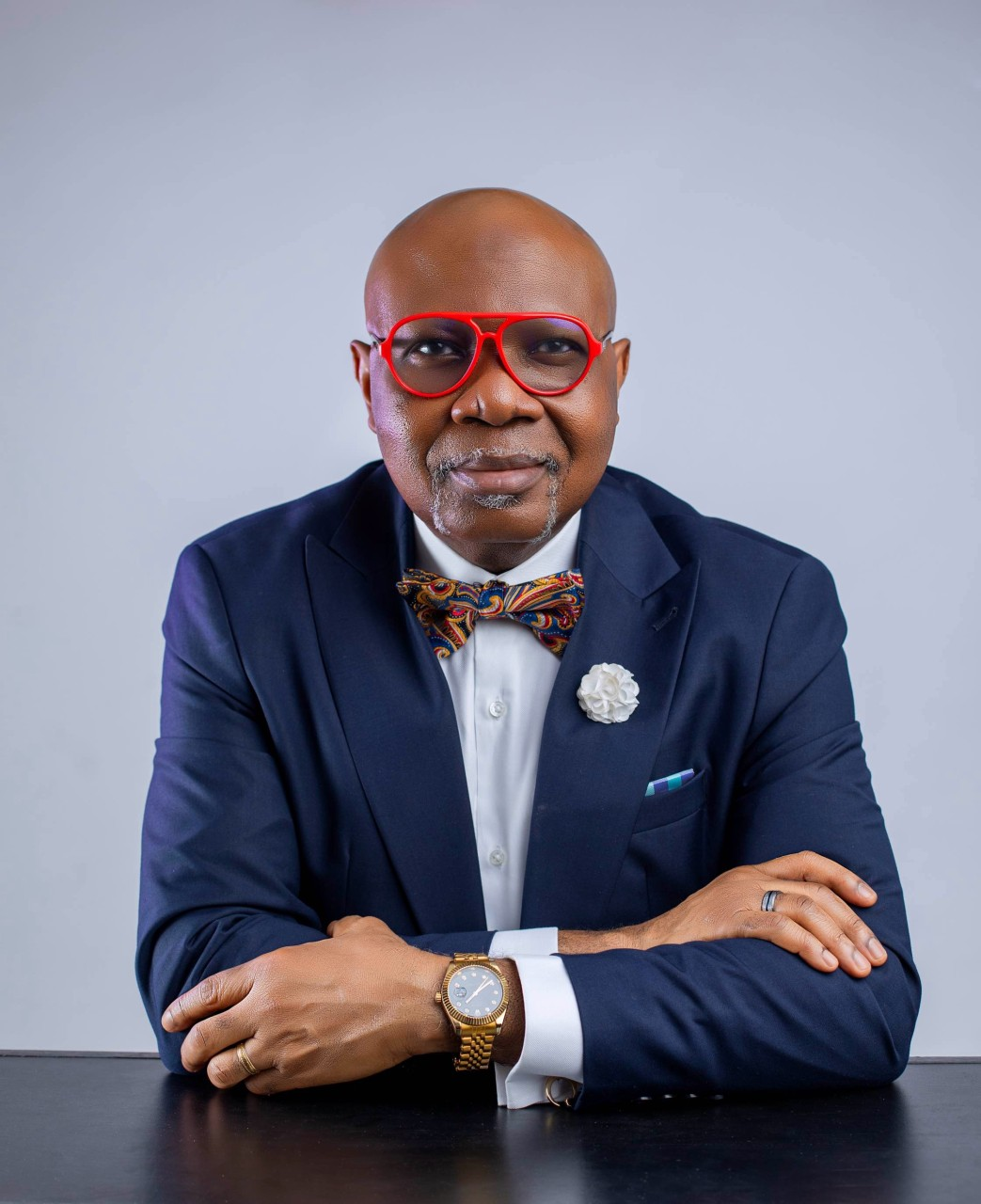
- Born: 12 May 1963 (age 63); Abeokuta, Ogun State, Nigeria
- Citizenship: Nigerian
- Education: University of Ibadan (MBBS); University of Lagos (MSc, PhD); Ahmadu Bello University (MBA)
- Occupations: Medical doctor, academic administrator, entrepreneur, leadership strategist
- Employer: University of Lagos
- Known for: Quinine Testicular Model; Founding Executive Director of ULBS; Co-author of National Clinical Practice Guidelines for Diabetes Management
- Title: Dean, School of Postgraduate Studies, UNILAG
- Board member of: UNILAG Governing Council

Abraham Adewale Adepoju Osinubi (born May 12, 1963) is a Nigerian medical doctor, anatomist, academic administrator, and leadership strategist. He is the Dean of the School of Postgraduate Studies (SPGS) at the University of Lagos (UNILAG) and a member of the university's Governing Council. Notably, he was the founding Executive Director of the University of Lagos Business School (ULBS). His biomedical research focuses on reproductive endocrinology, neuroendocrinology, and oxidative stress, placing him within the top 2% of researchers in Nigeria and Africa according to the Alper-Doger (AD) Scientific Index.

== Early life and education ==
Osinubi was born on May 12, 1963, in Abeokuta, Ogun State, Nigeria, to Chief Zacchaeus Adeyemi Osinubi and Chief (Mrs.) Alice Afolake Osinubi. He completed his primary education at All Saints’ Anglican Primary School, Yaba (1969–1975), and attended Government College, Ketu, Lagos (1975–1980), where he served as Head Boy and graduated with a Division One Distinction in the West African School Certificate Examination.

He graduated from the University of Ibadan in 1987 with a Bachelor of Medicine, Bachelor of Surgery (M.B.B.S.) degree. He obtained a Master of Science (M.Sc.) in Anatomy in 2000 and a Doctor of Philosophy (Ph.D.) in Anatomy in 2006, both from the University of Lagos. Additionally, Osinubi earned a Master of Business Administration (MBA) from Ahmadu Bello University, Zaria.

== Academic career ==
Osinubi joined the faculty of the College of Medicine, University of Lagos, on March 1, 2001. From 2008 to 2009, he went on a sabbatical appointment to the Lagos State University College of Medicine (LASUCOM), where he served as the Head of the Department of Anatomy. During his tenure at LASUCOM, he introduced Problem-Based Learning (PBL) to the medical curriculum.

He returned to the University of Lagos and served as the Head of the Department of Anatomy from 2010 to 2012, followed by a tenure as Sub-Dean of the Faculty of Basic Medical Sciences (2012–2014). During this period, he became the founding Editor-in-Chief of the University of Lagos Journal of Basic Medical Sciences. He pioneered the adoption of Case-Based Learning (CBL) at the institution.

Osinubi was promoted to full Professor of Anatomy in 2015. In 2017, he delivered his inaugural lecture, titled “The Anatomist: Jack-of-all-Trades, Master of All”.

== Institutional leadership and administration ==
=== University of Lagos Business School (ULBS) ===
From June 2018 to May 2022, Osinubi served as the founding Executive Director of the University of Lagos Business School (ULBS). Under his administration, the school secured operational approval from the National Universities Commission (NUC) in 2019, gained induction into the London-based Business Graduates Association (BGA) in 2020, and received recognition from the Association of African Business Schools (AABS) in 2021. He conceptualized and launched postgraduate professional portfolios, including the Executive MBA (EMBA), Doctor of Business Administration (DBA), Executive Master of Public Health (EMPH), and Executive Master of Non-Interest Finance (EMNIF).

=== School of Postgraduate Studies (SPGS) & Current Roles ===
Following his tenure at ULBS, Osinubi was appointed Global Programme Director at the Unicorn Group, serving from June to November 2022. He chaired the Board of Medilag Consult from 2023 to 2025.

He currently serves as the Dean of the School of Postgraduate Studies (SPGS) at the University of Lagos, where he directs curriculum adjustments, structural expansions, and digital administrative overhauls. Concurrently, he is the Vice-President of the Lagos University Medical Society.

== Entrepreneurship and corporate leadership ==
Outside of public academia, Osinubi founded and managed a private medical facility in Lagos from 1991 to 2000. Between 2016 and 2022, he functioned as a lead business strategist and country representative for a multinational corporation.

As the lead facilitator for Leadership and Organizational Behaviour at ULBS, he developed the "Osinubi Leadership Blueprint," a pedagogical framework designed for executive team-building and leadership development. He frequently conducts corporate leadership training workshops utilizing this methodology.

Osinubi serves on several boards, including the Governing Council of the University of Lagos, the Board of Trustees of the Association of Clinical Endocrinologists of Nigeria, and the Executive Council of the Academy of Medical Sciences.

== Research and publications ==
Osinubi has authored over 130 peer-reviewed academic publications and two textbooks on human anatomy. His research focuses significantly on endocrine biology, reproductive health, and cellular oxidative balance:

- The Quinine Testicular Model: Developed between 2000 and 2006, this model is used to evaluate male fertility, reproductive toxicity, and spermatogenesis.
- Chronobiology Research: His investigations into circadian rhythms regarding blood parameters provided insights into the chronotherapeutic management of anemia and diabetes mellitus.
- Clinical Practice: He was a contributor to the first and second editions of Nigeria’s National Clinical Practice Guidelines for Diabetes Management (2012, 2013).

== Fellowships and honors ==
Osinubi is a Fellow of several professional bodies, including:

- Fellow, American College of Endocrinology (FACE, 2009)
- Fellow, Anatomical Society of Nigeria (FASN, 2016)
- Fellow, Academy of Medicine Specialties of Nigeria (FAMeds, 2021)
- Fellow, Nigerian Academy of Medicine (FNAMed, 2021)
- Fellow, Endocrine and Metabolism Society of Nigeria (FEMSON, 2022)
- Distinguished Fellow, Institute of Security Nigeria (dfisn, 2025)

== Personal life ==
Osinubi is married with children. He is a theologian whose community work includes public health advocacy and grassroots socioeconomic development. He is the author of the 21-Point Action Plan for Perfect Health, a wellness framework combining health education and lifestyle coaching.
