= Eniola Olaitan Ajayi =

Nigerian politician and diplomat (born 1965)

Ambassador Eniola Olaitan Ajayi

Nigerian Ambassador to Netherlands
- Incumbent
- Assumed office May 2021
- Preceded by: Oji Ngofa

Nigerian Ambassador to Hungary
- In office June 2017 – April 2021
- Succeeded by: Modupe Irele

Commissioner for Environment Ekiti State
- In office February 2013 – October 2015

Commissioner for Education, Science and Technology Ekiti State
- In office December 2010 – January 2013

Personal details
- Born: 18 January 1965 (age 61) Ekiti State, Nigeria
- Party: All Progressive Congress (APC)
- Education: B.Sc, M.Phil, O.D, FNOA
- Alma mater: Christ's School, Ado Ekiti; University of Benin; University of London
- Occupation: Diplomat
- Profession: Consultant Optometrist
- Website: eniolaajayi.com

Eniola Olaitan Ajayi (born 18 January 1965) is a Nigerian politician and diplomat currently serving as Nigerian ambassador to the Kingdom of Netherlands and the Permanent Representative of Nigeria to the Organisation for the Prohibition of Chemical Weapons (OPCW) since May 2021. She previously served as Nigerian ambassador to Hungary with concurrent accreditation to Serbia, Croatia, and Bosnia and Herzegovina from October 2017 to April 2021.

== Background ==
Eniola Olaitan Ajayi was born on 18 January 1965 in Ipoti Ekiti. She had her secondary education at Christ's School, Ado – Ekiti. She graduated as a Doctor of Optometry from the University of Benin. She proceeded to obtain a Master of Philosophy in Ocular Pathology from University of London with postgraduate research and training from Moorfields Eye Hospital and St Thomas’ Hospital in London. She was the best graduating student in her Special Doctor of Optometry class. Upon Graduation in 1986, she worked with the Eye Department of 445 Nigerian Air force Hospital in Lagos under the Ministry of Defence before starting a private practice in 1997. The practice, Enny Eye Care (Eye Clinic and Optical Services) now has two outlets in Lagos-Nigeria, Ikeja and Ikoyi.

== Political career ==
Ajayi served her first term as Commissioner for Education, Science and Technology in Ekiti state of Nigeria where she implemented landmark reforms in the education sector. She was later re-appointed as the Commissioner for Environment between February 2013 and October 2014. She was the first woman to win her party's ticket through a free and fair primary election that involved four (4) other men to contest for the House of Representative seat in Ekiti Central Federal Constituency 1 comprising Ado Local Government and Irepodun/Ifelodun local government in year 2015.

=== Commissioner for Education, Science and Technology ===
As commissioner for education in Ekiti from December 2010 till January 2013, H.E. Dr Eniola Olaitan Ajayi worked with the team of Governor Kayode Fayemi to actualize his 8-point agenda. She superintended the merger of the three universities at the time to the new and virile Ekiti State University. It was also under her leadership that the law establishing the College of Education, Ikere Ekiti was re-enacted.

=== Commissioner for Environment ===
Ajayi also served as commissioner for Environment from February 2013 till October 2015. Under this role, she spearheaded the efforts to reduce illegal felling of trees, achieve forest regeneration and improved internally generated revenue through Forestry activities. She also commenced the establishment of Forestry Commission for proper administration of the Forest through inclusive engagement of all the Forestry Stakeholders in Ekiti State.

== Diplomatic career ==
Ajayi began her diplomatic career following her appointment and subsequent assignment to Hungary as Nigerian ambassador. She served as Nigerian ambassador to Hungary with concurrent accreditation to Serbia, Croatia, Bosnia and Herzegovina, until her reassignment to the Kingdom of Netherlands. She served as the chairperson for the Ninety-Ninth Session of the Executive Council (EC-99) of the Organisation for the Prohibition of Chemical Weapons (OPCW), and is the current Chairperson of the Governing Council of the Common Fund for Commodities (CFC).
