= Yakubu Itua =

Nigerian custom and jurist

Justice Yakubu Itua (9 October 1941 – 8 August 2006) was a Nigerian jurist and member of the Nigerian House of Representatives in 1983. He was appointed a judge in the Edo State judiciary in 1999, by the then military governor of Edo State, Navy Captain Anthony Onyearugbulem with recommendation by the National Judiciary commission.

== Early life ==
Itua was born in Ewu, a small town in Esan Central LGA of present-day Edo State. He attended St Patric's College at Asaba, Delta State for his secondary school education. He briefly worked with the Nigerian Institute of Oil Palm Research in Benin.

== Career ==
Itua joined the Nigeria Customs Service, but was later dismissed. Itua enrolled and got admission into the University of Lagos in 1968 and graduated. Itua was called to the bar and established his own law firm "Itua and co" in Benin City.

Itua went into politics and contested a seat of the Nigerian House of Representatives, which he won in 1983. His membership was short-lived after the military government under Muhammadu Buhari took power and suspended the Nigerian constitution.

Itua returned to his legal profession and established a law firm. He was legal adviser to various companies and organisations in Edo State and other parts of Nigeria.

== Death ==
Itua died on 8 August 2006 of cardiac arrest.
