= Sophia Omotola Omidiji =

Nigerian footballer (born 1997)

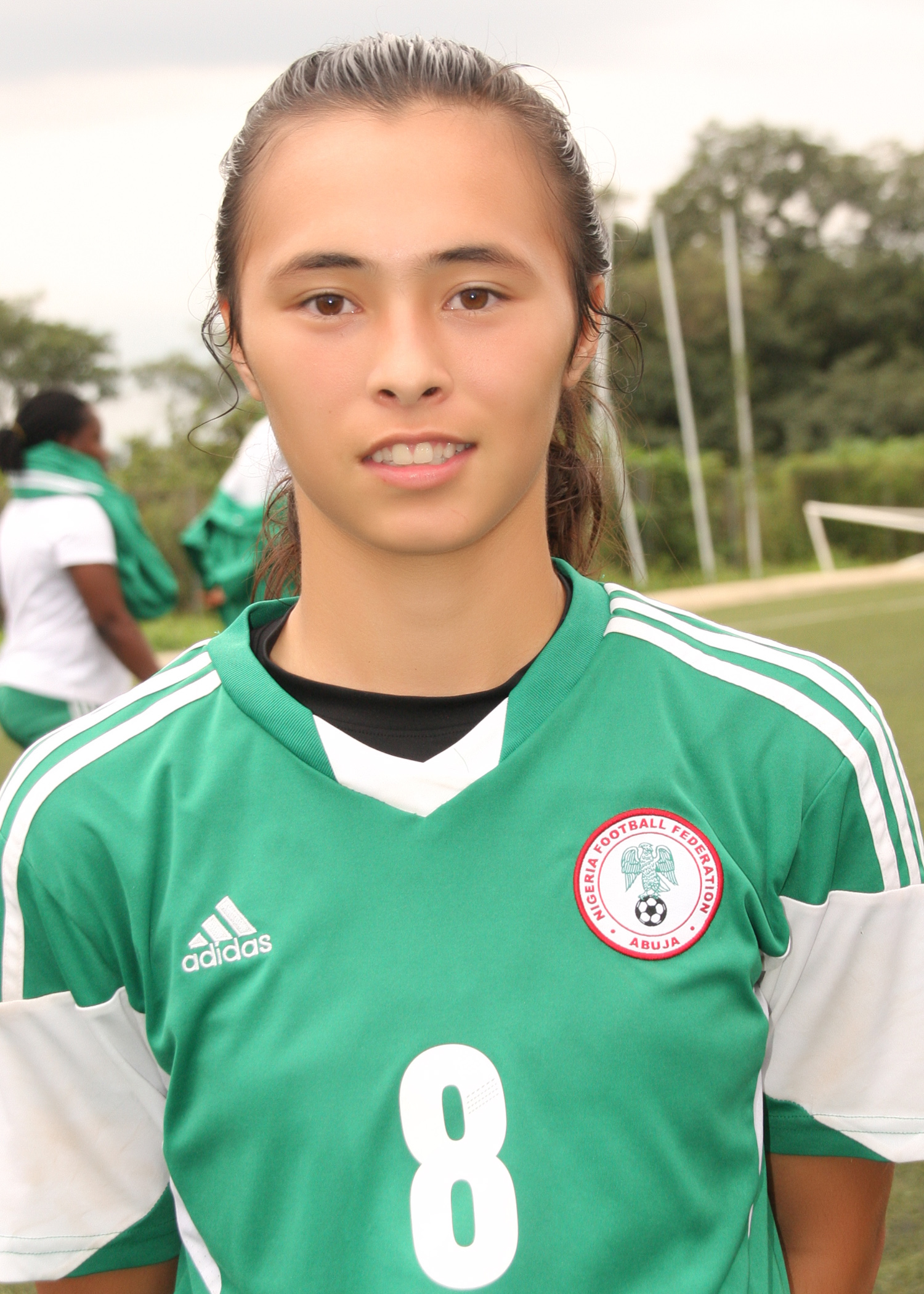
- Picture at camp with Nigeria U20 National team September 2015.

Personal information
- Full name: Sophia Omotola Omidiji
- Date of birth: June 18, 1997 (age 29)
- Place of birth: Las Vegas, Nevada, United States
- Height: 5 ft 2 in (1.57 m)
- Position: Forward

Team information
- Current team: S.B.V. Excelsior

Youth career
- 2013–2015: Las Vegas Premier Sports Academy

Senior career*
Years	Team	Apps	(Gls)
2015	PSV/FC Eindhoven	20	(18)
2016–2017	KAA Gent	20	(15)
2017–2018	S.B.V. Excelsior	18	(8)
2018–	FC RDC	15	(25)
Total		73	(66)

International career^{‡}
2013–	Nigeria U-20	2	(0)
- * Club domestic league appearances and goals ‡ National team caps and goals as of May 15, 2017

Sophia Omotola Omidiji (born June 18, 1997) is a Nigerian-American football player. She played for the Nigerian U-20 Women National team and is signed to Dutch Division I Club S.B.V. Excelsior after completing a switch from KAA Gent in Belgium in June 2017.

== Early life ==
Sophia Omotola Omidiji was born on June 18, 1997, and raised in Las Vegas, Nevada, by a Nigerian father and an American mother. She has three younger brothers and began playing football at the age of six. Omidiji played high school football for Sierra Vista High School where she is the all-time leading goal scorer with 98 goals in four seasons including scoring 38 goals in her final season. She played at the school including the school's first ever regional/State/NIAA Southern Nevada final. She also played club soccer with Las Vegas Premier Sports Academy for coach Eyal Dahan.

== Playing career ==
=== PSV / FC EINDHOVEN ===
In August 2015, Omidiji signed with PSV/FC Eindhoven women's team in the Netherlands prior to going to camp with the Nigerian U20 women National team, .

KAA GENT

In 2016, Sophia Omidiji transferred to KAA Gent which is a team that plays in the Belgium division I and played in 20 games and scored 18 goals with 12 assists.

S.B.V. Excelsior

In June 2017 Sophia Omidiji made the transfer from KAA Gent to S.B.V Excelsior which is a new addition to the Dutch Eredivisie which is the division I in the Netherlands.

International

Omidiji received her first national team call up with Nigeria women's national under-20 football team for an African world cup U-20 qualification game against Democratic Republic of Congo in an away game in Kinshasa. She called the call up to the national team the "greatest honor of my life".

She trained with the team in Abuja before heading to Kinshasa for the game against Congo where Nigeria won 2–1.

She received a national team call up into the senior women's team the super falcons on April 2 for a friendly against France.

== Personal ==
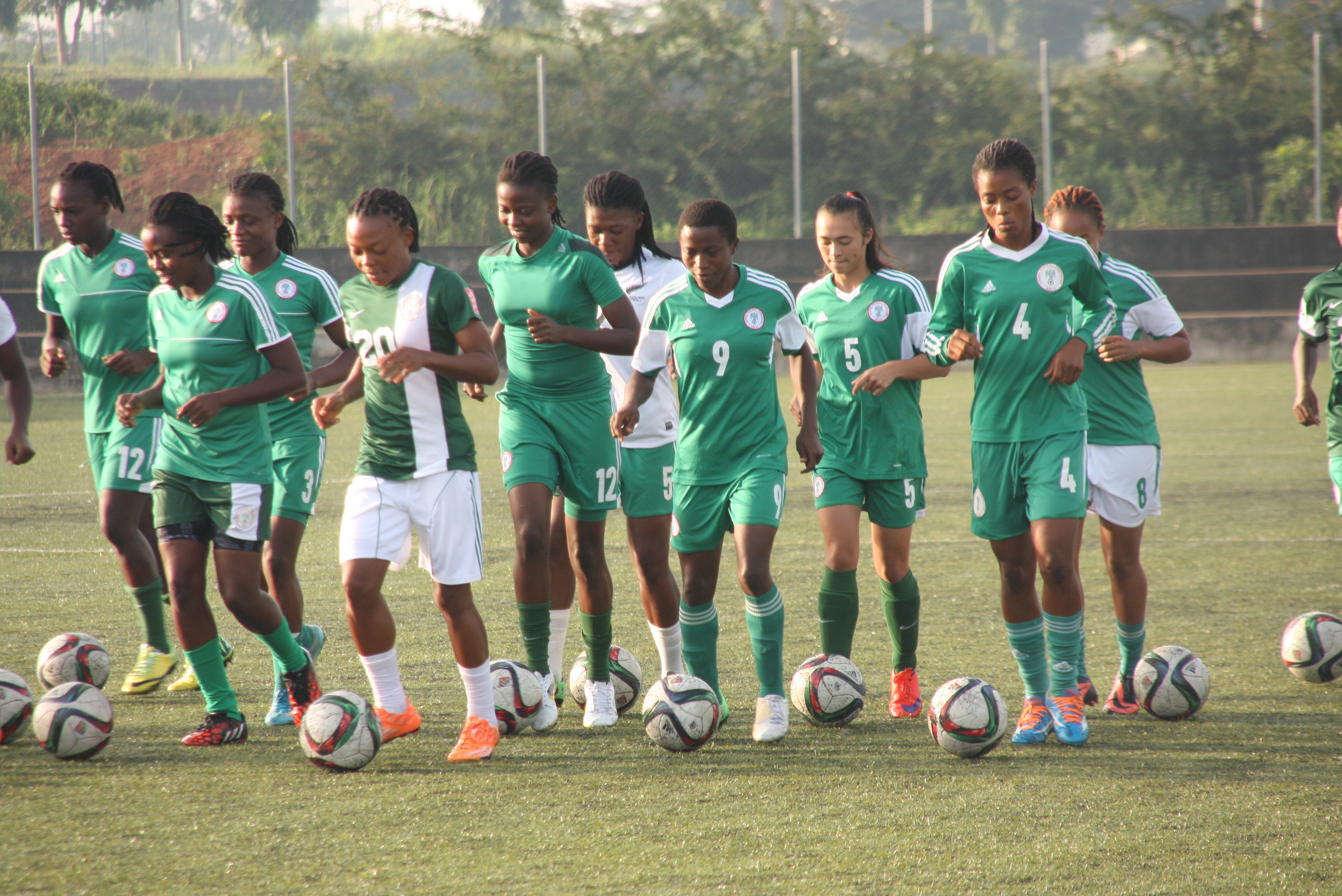
World cup qualifiers preparation training in Abuja September 2015

Omidiji has 3 younger brothers. Lateef Omidiji Jr played for the 2016-2017 current Dutch champions of the Netherlands: Feyenoord O15's. Rasheed Omidiji played for FC Den Bosch's O10's selection team. Amir Omidiji played for V.V Baronie's JY7's.
