= Oyewusi Ibidapo-Obe =

Nigerian professor (1949–2021)

8th Vice chancellor of the University of Lagos
- In office 2000–2007
- Preceded by: Jelili Adebisi Omotola
- Succeeded by: Tolu Olukayode Odugbemi

Personal details
- Born: 5 July 1949 Ile Ife, Southern Region, British Nigeria (now in Osun State, Nigeria)
- Died: 3 January 2021 (aged 71) Lagos, Nigeria
- Party: Non-Partisan

Oyewusi Ibidapo-Obe (5 July 1949 – 3 January 2021) was a Nigerian professor of Systems Engineering educational administrator and vice chancellor of the University of Lagos. He died from COVID-19 complications on 3 January 2021, during the COVID-19 pandemic in Nigeria.

== Education ==
He attended Lagos Street African Church Primary School, Ebute-Metta (1955–1961) and Obokun High School/Ilesa Grammar School (1962–1966) and later attended Igbobi College, Yaba, (1966–1968) Lagos state, Nigeria for his secondary education.

He received a bachelor's degree in Mathematics from the University of Lagos. He obtained a Master in Mathematics (M.Maths) degree in Applied Mathematics with a minor in Computer Science in the year 1973 and further with a Doctor of Philosophy (PhD) in Civil Engineering specializing in Applied Mechanics/System in 1976 from the University of Waterloo Canada.https://www.vanguardngr.com/2021/01/former-unilag-vc-prof-ibidapo-obe-is-dead/https:

== Life and career ==
Ibidapo Obe was born on 5 July 1949, at Ile Ife, Osun State Nigeria. He served as a Visiting Research Associate Professor in the Department of Civil Engineering at the State University of New York at Buffalo, US (1980–1981). In 2007, he was a Visiting Research Professor at Texas Southern University in Houston, USA. He was appointed as the Vice chancellor of the University of Lagos in year 2000, succeeding Jelili Adebisi Omotola. He was later succeeded by Tolu Olukayode Odugbemi in 2007 after his successful tenure. He was married to Sola Ibidapo-Obe.https://thenationonlineng.net/ibidapo-obe-didnt-die-of-covid-19-says-family/

== Awards and honours ==
- University of Waterloo Post Doctoral Distinction Award Fellow (1976). He was a fellow of the Natural Sciences and Engineering Research Council, Canada (1977–1979)
- Fellowship of the Academy of Science and Engineering.
- In 2004 he was conferred the national honor as the Officer of the Federal Republic (OFR) by the Federal Republic of Nigeria.https://thenationonlineng.net/10-things-to-know-about-ex-unilag-vc-late-prof-ibidapo-obe/
- He was a two-time Award recipient of the Best Vice Chancellor Prize (2004, 2005) for the Nigerian University System (NUS), https://thenationonlineng.net/10-things-to-know-about-ex-unilag-vc-late-prof-ibidapo-obe
- Awarded The Faculty of Engineering Alumni Achievement Medal for Academic Excellence Award in 2006 from the University of Waterloo for his pioneering teaching and research in the field of control and information systems, for his stewardship of the University of Lagos and for bringing honour to the Waterloo Engineering name across Nigeria.https://uwaterloo.ca/engineering/alumni-achievement-medal-past-recipients
- In 2010 he was elected Fellow of the African Academy of Science (AAS), As well as that of The World Academy of Science (TWAS).https://thenationonlineng.net/10-things-to-know-about-ex-unilag-vc-late-prof-ibidapo-obe/

== Membership of professional bodies ==
- Fellow of the Africa Academy of Science
- Fellow of the Academy of Sciences for the Developing World (TWAS)

== See also ==
- List of vice chancellors in Nigeria
- Jelili Adebisi Omotola
- University of Lagos
