= Babatunde Adetokunbo Sofoluwe =

Nigerian academic

Professor Babatunde Adetokunbo Sofoluwe
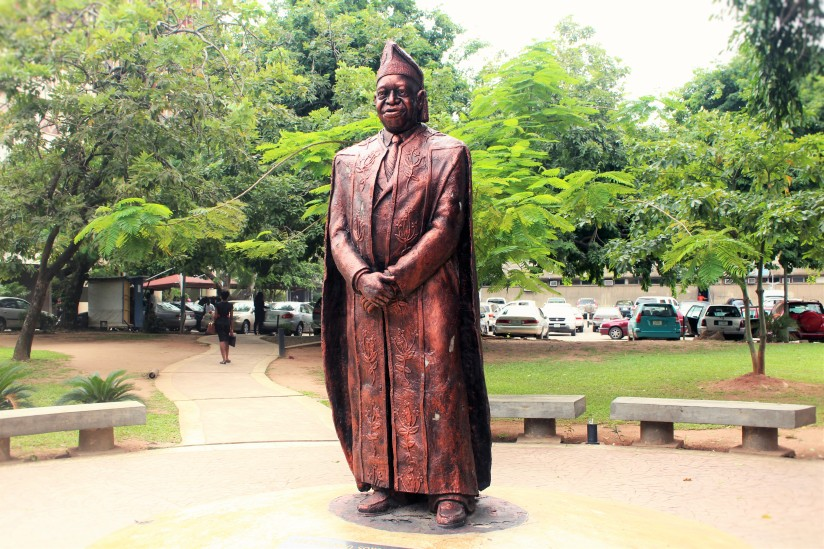
- Statue dedicated to Prof. Sofoluwe in a park named after him, UNILAG.

10th Vice chancellor of the University of Lagos
- In office 31 January 2010 – 12 May 2012
- Preceded by: Tolu Olukayode Odugbemi
- Succeeded by: Rahmon Ade Bello

Personal details
- Born: 15 April 1950 Nigeria
- Died: 12 May 2012 (aged 62)
- Citizenship: Nigeria
- Party: Non-partisan
- Education: University of Lagos, University of Edinburgh

Babatunde Adetokunbo Sofoluwe (15 April 1950 – 12 May 2012) was a Nigerian professor of Computer science, educational administrator and former vice chancellor of the University of Lagos, Nigeria. He was appointed vice chancellor of the University of Lagos on 31 January 2010, to succeed professor Tolu Olukayode Odugbemi.

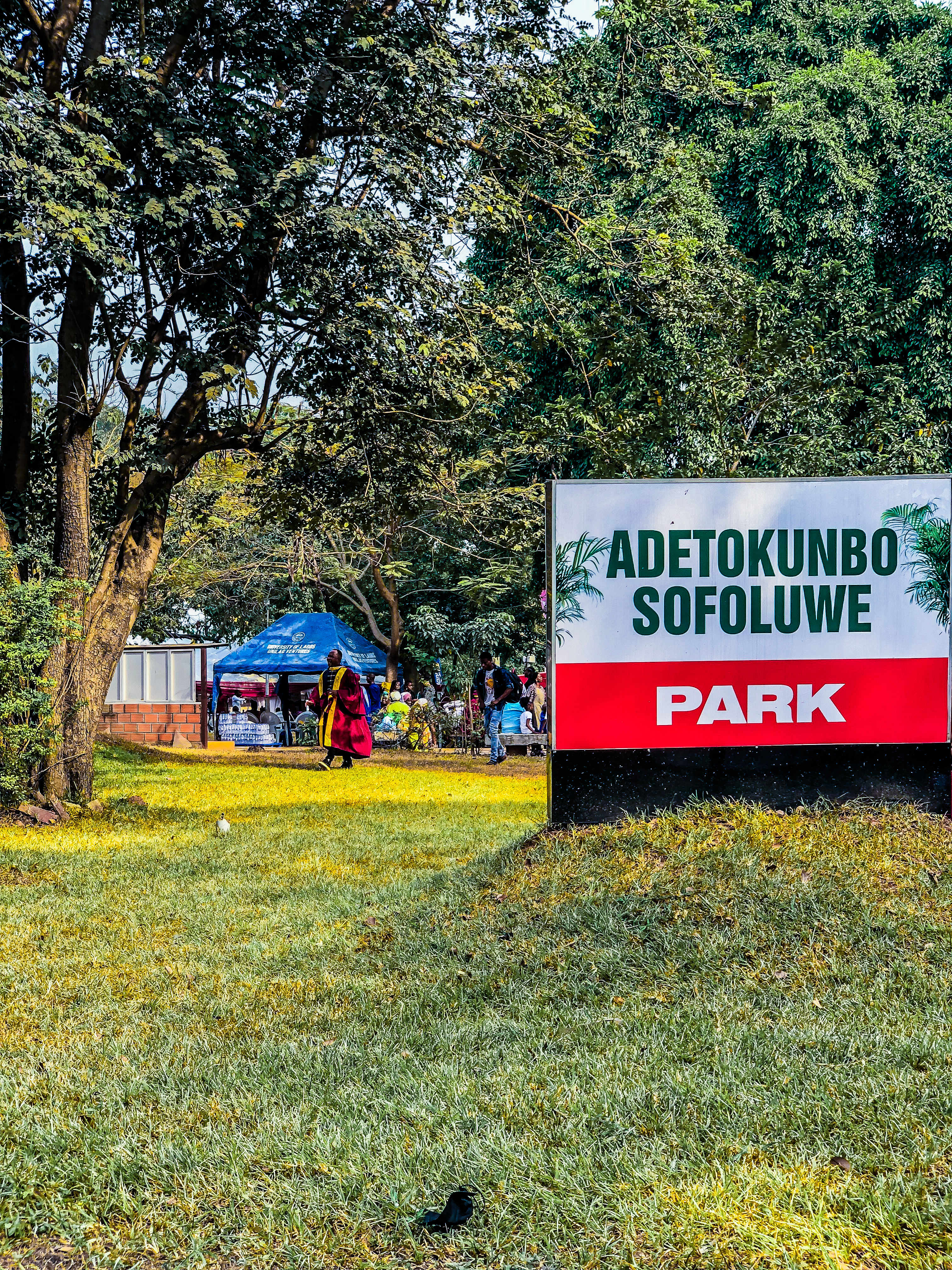
A Park in the University of Lagos named after Adetokunbo Sofoluwe

== Education ==
He obtained a Bachelor of Science (BSc) degree in mathematics from the University of Lagos in 1973. He obtained the Commonwealth Scholarship award to study at the University of Edinburgh, Scotland where he graduated with a Master of Science (MSc) degree in 1975 and a doctorate in 1981.

== Life and career ==
Sofoluwe began his career in 1976 as a Graduate Assistant in the University of Lagos where he later became a full Professor in October 1996. He served as Dean of the Faculty of Science for two consecutive terms. Before he became the vice chancellor of the University of Lagos, he was Deputy Vice-Chancellor of the university. He had also served as the Director of Academics Planning Unit of the University of Lagos before his appointment as the Deputy Vice-Chancellor (Management). He has authored and co-authored numerous academic books and articles in several reputable local and international journals before his death in 2012.

== Membership of professional bodies ==
He was a member of several professional bodies, few of which includes:

- Fellow of the Computer Association of Nigeria (COAN).
- Fellow of the Institute of Mathematics and Its Application (IMA)
- Fellow of the Computer Professionals of Nigeria (CPN)
- Member of the Society for Individual and Applied Mathematics (SIAM).
- Fellow of the Academy of Science

== Selected works ==
- A reliable protection architecture for mobile agents in open network systems. International Journal of Computer Applications, 17(7), 6-14.
- The 1st Annual Memorial Lecture in Honour Late 10th Vice-Chancellor, Professor Adetokunbo Babatunde Sofoluwe, FAS.
- Towards a Granular Computing framework for Program Analysis.
- Beyond Calculations.
- A Reliable Protection Architecture for Mobile Agents in Open Network Systems.
- Studies of a structural form for underwater structures.

== See also ==
- List of vice chancellors in Nigeria
- University of Lagos
- Tolu Olukayode Odugbemi
