= Jelili Adebisi Omotola =

7th Vice chancellor of the University of Lagos
- In office 1995–2000
- Preceded by: Nurudeen Oladapo Alao
- Succeeded by: Oyewusi Ibidapo Obe

Personal details
- Born: 20 April 1941 Ijebu-Ode, Southern Region, British Nigeria (now in Ogun State, Nigeria)
- Died: 29 March 2006 (aged 64) Isolo, Lagos state, Nigeria
- Party: Non-Partisan

Jelili Adebisi Omotola OON (20 April 1941 – 29 March 2006) was a Nigerian professor of Property Law, Senior Advocate of Nigeria (SAN), educational administrator and former vice chancellor of the University of Lagos.

== Education ==
In 1961, he obtained his first school leaving certificate, West African School Certificate (WASC). In 1966, he received the University of London Merit Award in English Law and Criminal Law. in 1967 he obtained his LLB at the University of London and in 1971, he achieved the Doctor of philosophy (Ph.D) degree in Law from the same university.

== Life and career ==
He was appointed as Vice chancellor of the University of Lagos in 1995, a tenure that lasted for five years (1995–2000). Jelili is one of the law professionals that contributed significantly to property law and the Land Use Act in Nigeria.

== See also ==
- List of vice chancellors in Nigeria
- University of Lagos
- Oyewusi Ibidapo Obe
