= Lateef Omidiji =

Footballer (born 2003)

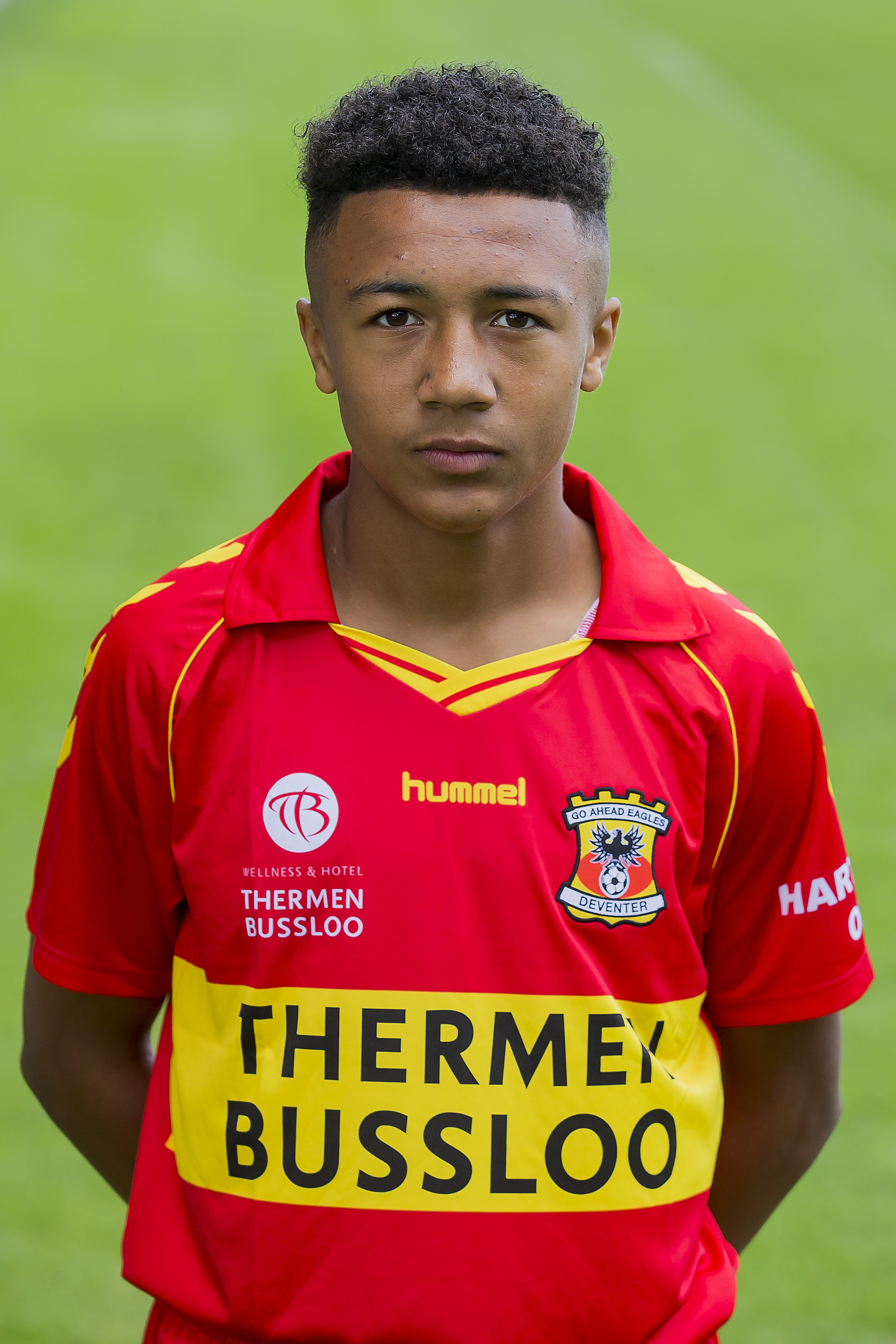

Personal information
- Full name: Lateef Omotola Omidiji Jr.
- Date of birth: 14 September 2003 (age 23)
- Place of birth: Las Vegas, United States
- Height: 5 ft 11 in (1.80 m)
- Position: Forward

Youth career
- FC Dordrecht
- 2017–2018: Feyenoord
- 2018–2020: Go Ahead Eagles

College career
Years	Team	Apps	(Gls)
2021	UNLV Rebels	16	(1)

International career^{‡}
- United States U14
- United States U15
- United States U16
2018–2018	Nigeria U15		
2019–????	Nigeria U17		
- ‡ National team caps and goals as of 14:45, 29 August 2021 (UTC)

Lateef Omotola Omidiji Jr. (born 14 September 2003) is a soccer player who plays as a forward. Born in the United States, he has represented both the US and Nigeria at youth international level.

== Early and personal life ==
Omidiji was born in Las Vegas to a Nigerian father (who is Muslim) and an American mother. His sister is Sophia Omotola Omidiji. In June 2017 he described himself as a "straight A student" who had received an award from President Obama for his grades.

== Club career ==
Omidiji began his career at the age of 5 with the Rainbow Youth Soccer League in Las Vegas. At the age of 10 he was described as a "soccer prodigy".

He moved from FC Dordrecht to Feyenoord in 2017. He later moved to Go Ahead Eagles.

In November 2020 it was announced that Omidiji had returned to the United States to attend high school in Las Vegas, and had signed a letter of intent with the UNLV Rebels. he scored 1 goal in 16 games in the 2021 season.

== International career ==
Omidiji is eligible to represent the United States and Nigeria.

After representing the United States at under-14, under-15 and under-16 levels, he began playing for Nigeria under-15s in May 2018. He is also eligible to represent the Netherlands. In 2019 he was dropped by the Nigeria under-17s.
