= Tunde Onakoya =

Nigerian chess player (born 1994)

Personal information
- Born: 6 October 1994 (age 31) Ikorodu, Nigeria

Chess career
- Country: Nigeria
- Peak rating: 2197 (July 2016)

Tunde Onakoya (born 6 October 1994) is a Nigerian chess player and coach, who holds the Guinness World Record for the longest marathon chess game. As the founder and convener of Chess in Slums Africa, he has organised a number of interventions for children across slums in Lagos state including Majidun (Ikorodu), Makoko and recently, Oshodi.

== Background and career ==
Onakoya learned to play chess at a barber's shop in a slum in Ikorodu, Lagos, where he grew up. Being unable to pay for his secondary school, his mother offered to work for a school as a cleaner in exchange for his school fees. He would later be ranked as the number 13 chess player in Nigeria.

Onakoya got a diploma in computer science at Yaba College of Technology where he was a gold medallist representing the school in Nigeria Polytechnic Games and also at the RCCG Chess Championship. He has also won the National Friends of Chess and the Chevron Chess Open.

Onakoya was featured in CNN African Voices.

Onakoya is a board member of the New York City-based non-profit The Gift of Chess.

On 20 April 2024, Onakoya broke the world chess marathon record in New York, United States. He played for over 60 consecutive hours.

== Chess in Slums Africa ==
Tunde has said that to him, Chess is more than a game, it gives him his constant identity. “Finding chess gave me something. It gave me an identity, an intellectual one, and it made me believe that I could also be intellectually inclined, and it made me believe that I could also be a thinker. That through just this game, I could find my place in the world again,” said Onakoya on his discovery of chess during a speaking event in Germany.

In September 2018, Chess in Slums Africa started as a volunteer driven non-profit organization that aims to empower young people in impoverished communities through chess.

Chess in Slums Africa partnered with Chess.com in September 2020 as an educational tool for classrooms, chess clubs, and parents.

As of June 2021, Chess in Slums Africa had trained over 200 children and got lifelong scholarships for 20 of them.

In May 2021, Ferdinand, a 10-year-old boy with cerebral palsy won the chess tournament in Makoko. He later met and competed with Babajide Sanwo-Olu, the governor of Lagos State.

== Guinness World Record ==
The chess marathon was held in Times Square, New York City, United States. He began with the goal of surpassing the previous world record of 56 hours, 9 minutes, and 37 seconds, set by Norwegian players Hallvard Haug Flatebø and Sjur Ferkingstad in 2018. Onakoya's initial target was to play for 58 hours, but he pushed the boundaries even further, extending the marathon to a full 60 hours.

Onakoya aimed to raise US$1 million for the education of children in Africa, particularly those without access to quality education. While he was trying to set a new record, he got support from Nigerian community in New York, former vice president of Nigeria Yemi Osinbajo, along with Kashim Shettima, including appearances by Afrobeats stars like Davido and Adekunle Gold.
