= Eniola Akinkuotu =

Nigerian journalist and writer (born 1986)

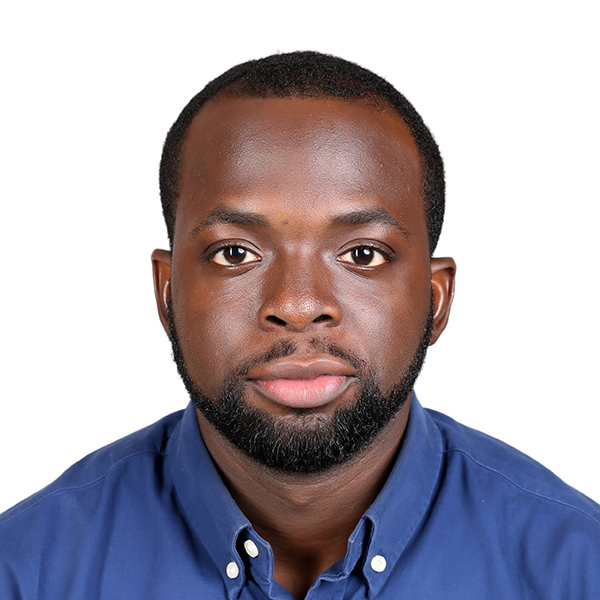
- Born: 1986 (age 39–40); Lagos, Nigeria
- Occupation: Journalist
- Years active: 2006–present
- Known for: Human rights, Corruption, Crime Reporter

Eniola Akinkuotu (born 1986) is a Nigerian journalist and writer. He studied at the University of Lagos.

== Career ==
Akinkuotu's journalism career spans across various beats. Between 2011 and 2014, he published mostly stories bordering on crime and human rights violation. He then proceeded to the politics desk where he covered the 2014 Ekiti State gubernatorial election.

Akinkuotu has been a journalist with The Punch newspaper since 2011. In 2016, he was working in tandem with the then government policy against corruption. In 2022, he left The Punch newspaper for The Africa Report where he currently serves as a chief correspondent.

One of Akinkuotu's report was listed as runner up in the Judicial Reporting Category at the Judicial Reporting Category at the Diamond Media Award for Media Excellence. He was the winner of the UNICEF Prize for Child-Friendly Reporting at the 2018 DAME Award. In 2020, he was a Runner Up in the Tourism category of the Nigeria Merit award.

== See also ==
- Goodluck Jonathan
