= List of Ahmadu Bello University alumni =

Alumni of the Nigerian university

Ahmadu Bello University is a public university located in the city of Zaria, Kaduna State, northern Nigeria. As of 2015, it has graduated over 800,000 students.

This is the alphabetical list of some notable alumni.

== A ==
- Adamu Adamu, former Minister of Education
- Ahmed Tijani Mora, Pharmacist, Chairman, Pharmacists Council of Nigeria
- Azubuike Ihejirika, former chief of Army Staff
- Atiku Abubakar GCON, former Vice President, Federal Republic of Nigeria
- Ayodele Awojobi, Scientist and Professor at University of Lagos
- Attahiru Jega, Professor, former Chairman, Independent National Electoral Commission
- Abubakar El-Kanemi, Shehu of Borno
- Afakriya Gadzama, former Director General, Nigerian State Security Service
- Andrew Yakubu, former Group Managing Director, Nigerian National Petroleum Corporation
- Ahmed Makarfi, former Kaduna State Governor
- Aminu Safana, Medical Doctor, Politician
- Abdullahi Mustapha, former Vice Chancellor, Ahmadu Bello University
- Adamu Sidi Ali, Politician
- Abdul Ganiyu Ambali, Academic, former Vice Chancellor, University of Ilorin
- Awam Amkpa, Playwright, Professor of Dramatic Arts
- Andrew Jonathan Nok, Biochemist, Fellow Nigerian Academy of Science
- Adetoye Oyetola Sode, Engineer, former military administrator of Oyo State
- Ayo Salami, Jurist, and former president of the Nigerian courts of appeals
- Aminu Abdullahi Shagali, Politician
- Amina Adamu Aliyu High Court Judge
- Abdulmumini Hassan Rafindadi, former chief medical director, Ahmadu Bello University Teaching Hospitals, Zaria; former Vice Chancellor, Federal University, Lokoja
- Akanbi Oniyangi, Minister of Commerce and Defense during Nigeria's Second Republic
- Audu Innocent Ogbeh, Minister of Agriculture and Rural Development
- Abdullahi Umar Ganduje, former Governor of Kano State
- Abubakar Umar Suleiman, emir of Bade
- Abdalla Uba Adamu, Professor, former Vice Chancellor of National Open University
- Ayo Omidiran, Politician
- Abdulazeez Ibrahim, Politician
- Abdullahi Aliyu Sumaila, Administrator and Politician
- Adamu Maina Waziri, former Hon. Minister, Police Service Commission

== B ==
- Bala Achi, Historian, Educationist
- Bukar Abba Ibrahim, former Governor, Yobe State
- Bashiru Ademola Raji, Professor of soil science
- Bilkisu Yusuf, Journalist, women's rights Activist
- Bola Shagaya, Economist, business magnate
- Boss Gida Mustapha, Secretary to the Government of the Federation
- Bruce Onobrakpeya, foremost Nigerian Artist
- Yusuf Barnabas Bala, former Deputy Governor of Kaduna state
- Bashir Abubakar, Assistant Comptroller General of Custom

== C ==
- Cornelius Adebayo, academic, technocrat
- Clarence Olafemi, politician, former acting governor, Kogi State
- Clara Bata Ogunbiyi, jurist, justice of the Supreme Court of Nigeria
- Carol King, actress
- Charles Ayo, former vice-chancellor, Covenant University

== D ==
- Donald Duke, former Cross River state governor
- Dahiru Musdapher, former chief justice of Nigeria
- Danladi Slim Matawal, academic, civil engineer
- DIPP, Nigerian singer-songwriter and dancer

== E ==
- Elizabeth Ofili, physician, cardiologist
- Emmanuel Dangana Ocheja, lawyer, politician
- Emmanuel Kucha, academic, vice chancellor, University of Agriculture, Makurdi
- Elnathan John, lawyer, novelist

== F ==
- Faruk Imam, justice kogi state judiciary
- Fatima Batul Mukhtar, former vice-chancellor, Federal University Dutse (2016-2021)
- Fateema Mohammed, politician

== G ==
- Ghali Umar Na'Abba, former speaker, House of Representatives
- Gani Odutokun, academic, painter
- Garba Nadama, former governor of Sokoto State during Nigeria's Second Republic
- Garba Ali Mohammed, former military administrator of Niger State
- Goddy Jedy Agba, former oil marketer, politician
- Grace Chijimma Ezema, first female electrical engineer in Nigeria

== H ==
- Halima Tayo Alao, architect, former Minister of Environment and Housing
- Hadiza Isma El-Rufai, writer
- Henrietta Ogan, business administrator
- Hadiza Bala Usman, former managing director, Nigerian Port Authority (NPA)
- Hadiza Galadanci, professor of Obstetrics and Gynaecology
- Ibrahim Geidam, governor, Yobe State
- Idris Legbo Kutigi, former chief justice of Nigeria
- Ibrahim Lamorde, former chairman, EFCC
- Isa Yuguda, former governor, Bauchi State
- Ibrahim Hassan Dankwambo, governor, Gombe State
- Ibrahim Geidam, former governor of Yobe State and the incumbent Minister of Police Affairs
- Ibrahim Garba, former vice chancellor, Ahmadu Bello University
- Ibrahim Zakzaky, Shiite-Islam cleric, founder, Islamic Movement in Nigeria
- Ibrahim Shekarau, former governor, Kano state
- Ibrahim Shema, former governor, Katsina State
- Ibrahim Umar, scientist, former vice chancellor, Bayero University
- Ibrahim Bio, politician, former Minister of Sports
- Innocent Ujah, professor of obstetrics and gynaecology
- Isa Marte Hussaini, professor, fellow, Nigerian Academy of Science
- Mustapha Idrissa Timta, former emir of Gwoza
- Isaac Fola-Alade, architect
- Ifeoma Mabel Onyemelukwe, professor, African Literature in French Expression
- Ibrahim Hussaini Doko, director general of Raw Materials Nigeria

== J ==
- Jerry Gana, former Information Minister
- Jimmy Adegoke, climate scientist, academic
- John Obaro, technology entrepreneur, founder, SystemSpecs
- James Manager, lawyer, politician
- Joshua M. Lidani, lawyer, politician
- Jelili Atiku, multimedia artist

== K ==
- Kabiru Ibrahim Gaya, former governor, Kano state
- Kumai Bayang Akaahs, jurist, former justice of the Supreme Court of Nigeria
- Kabiru Bala, former vice chancellor of Ahmadu Bello University

== L ==
- Lawal Musa Daura, former director general, Nigerian State Security Service
- Lucy Jumeyi Ogbadu, former director, National Biotechnology Development Agency
- Lucy Surhyel Newman, banker

== M ==
- Mohammed Bello Adoke, former Minister of Justice & Attorney General of the Federation
- Maryam Ciroma, former Minister of Women Affairs
- Mansur Mukhtar, former executive director of the World Bank
- Mike Omotosho, national president of the Labour Party (Nigeria)
- Mohammed Bawa, retired colonel, former military administrator of Ekiti and Gombe states
- Muhammadu Kudu Abubakar, traditional ruler, Agaie Emirate
- Mustapha Akanbi, former head, Independent Corrupt Practices Commission
- Musa Datijo Muhammad, justice of the Supreme Court of Nigeria
- Muhammad Mustapha Abdallah, head, National Drug Law Enforcement Agency
- Mohammed Mana, army officer, former Military Administrator of Plateau State
- Margaret Ladipo, academic, former rector, Yaba College of Technology
- Maikanti Baru, engineer, 18th group managing director, Nigerian National Petroleum Corporation
- Mohammed Badaru Abubakar, politician, former governor, Jigawa State and current minister of defence
- Mike Onoja, civil servant, politician
- Magaji Muhammed, former Federal Minister of Interior, former Federal Minister of Industry, former Nigerian ambassador to the kingdom of Saudi Arabia
- Musa Danladi Abubakar, chief justice of Katsina State
- Musa Mohammed Sada, former minister, Federal Ministry of Mines and Steel

== N ==
- Nuhu Ribadu, former chairman, EFCC (2003-2007) and current National Security Adviser (NSA)
- Nnenadi Usman, former finance minister
- Namadi Sambo, former Vice President, Federal Republic of Nigeria
- Nasir Ahmad el-Rufai, former governor, Kaduna State
- Nkoyo Toyo, lawyer, former Nigerian ambassador to Ethiopia

== O ==
- Oladipo Diya, retired lt. general, Nigerian de facto vice president from 1994–1997
- Oyewale Tomori, scientist, university administrator, president, Nigeria Academy of Science
- Otaru Salihu Ohize, politician

== P ==
- Patrick Ibrahim Yakowa, former governor, Kaduna State

== R ==
- Rebecca Ndjoze-Ojo, Namibian politician and educator
- Rilwanu Lukman, former secretary general OPEC, former, Petroleum Minister
- Richard Ali, lawyer, writer, publisher
- Rachel Bakam, actress, TV presenter at Nigerian Television Authority

== S ==
- Sanusi Lamido Sanusi, former governor, Central Bank of Nigeria, current emir of Kano
- Samuel Oboh, architect
- Shamsudeen Usman, former Minister of National Planning
- Shehu Ladan, former GMD, NNPC
- Shettima Mustapha, former Minister of Agriculture, Defence and Interior
- Samuel Ioraer Ortom, former Minister of State, Trade and Investments
- Sunday Awoniyi, Northern Yoruba leader, former chairman, ACF
- Sagir Adamu Abbas, 11th vice chancellor, Bayero University Kano
- Solomon Arase, former IGP, Nigeria Police Force
- Simon Ajibola, politician, former senator, Kwara South
- Suraj Abdurrahman, architect, army officer
- Salamatu Hussaini Suleiman, lawyer, former Minister of Women Affairs and Social Development
- Sadiq Daba, actor, former anchor at Nigerian Television Authority
- Stephen Oru, former Minister of Niger Delta Affairs
- Salisu Abubakar Maikasuwa, politician
- Sunday Dare, journalist, media consultant, former Minister of Youth and Sports Development (2019–2023)
- Suleiman Othman Hunkuyi, politician
- Sharon Ikeazor, lawyer
- Sadiya Umar Farouq, politician, chieftain of defunct Congress for Progressive Change; pioneer Minister of Humanitarian Affairs, Disaster Management and Social Development

== T ==
- Turai Yar'Adua, former First Lady
- Tijjani Muhammad-Bande, career diplomat, president of 74th session, United Nations General Assembly
- Tonya Lawani, entrepreneur, brand specialist, author

== U ==
- Umaru Musa Yar'Adua, GCFR, former president, Federal Republic of Nigeria
- Usman Saidu Nasamu Dakingari, former governor, Kebbi State
- Ussif Rashid Sumaila, economist
- Umaru Tanko Al-Makura, former governor, Nasarawa State
- Usman Bayero Nafada, former deputy speaker, House of Representatives
- Usman Umar Kibiya, former acting head, Nigeria Immigration Service
- Abdullahi Umar Ganduje, former Kano state governor and incumbent national chairman of APC

== Y ==
- Yayale Ahmed, former secretary to the Government of the Federation
- Yusuf Abubakar Yusuf, former senator, Taraba Central (2019–2023)
- Yusuf Suleiman, former minister of transportation

== Z ==
- Zainab Abdulkadir Kure, politician
- Zainab Ahmad, former minister of finance (2019–2023)
- Kabura Zakama, poet
