= Adegoke =

- Gender: Male
- Language: Yoruba

Origin
- Origin: Nigeria
- Meaning: The crown has ascended
- Region of origin: South-west Nigeria

Adégòkè audiois both a surname and a given name of Yoruba origin meaning "the crown or royalty has ascended to the top, or has gained advancement". Notable people with the name include:

- Adegoke Adelabu (1915–1958), Nigerian politician
- Adegoke Fadare, Canadian politician
- Adegoke Olubummo (1923–1992), Nigerian academic and mathematician

Surname

- Enoch Olaoluwa Adegoke (born 2000), a Nigerian sprinter
- Jimmy Adegoke (born 1963), climate scientist and professor at the University of Missouri-Kansas City
- Mutiu Adegoke (born 1984), Nigerian football defender
- Saidat Adegoke (born 1985), Nigerian footballer
- Sam Adegoke, Nigerian actor
- Sarah Adegoke (born 1997), Nigerian tennis player
- Stephen Adegoke, American football coach and former player
- Kemi Badenoch, nee Adegoke (born 1980) Nigerian-British politician
