= Ladipo =

Ládípọ̀
- Gender: Male
- Language: Yoruba

Origin
- Origin: Nigeria
- Meaning: Wealth and success becomes plenty
- Region of origin: South-west Nigeria

Ladipo (alternatively spelled Ọládípọ̀) is both a Yoruba surname and a given name meaning "Wealth and Prosperity becomes plenty".

== Notable people with the name ==
Surname

- Duro Ladipo (1931–1978), Nigerian dramatist
- Kehinde Oluwatoyin Ladipo, Nigerian geologist
- Margaret Ladipo (born 1961), Nigerian academic
- Sarah Ladipo Manyika (born 1968), Nigerian-British writer
- Sule Ladipo (born 1974), Nigerian tennis player

Given name:

- Ladipo Oluwole (1892–1953), Nigerian physician
- Ladipo Adamolekun (born 1942), Nigerian academic
- Ladipo Solanke (c. 1886–1958), Nigerian activist
