= Remita =

Payment services company

- Type: Private
- Industry: E-commerce payment system
- Founded: 2003; 23 years ago
- Headquarters: Lagos, Nigeria
- Area served: Worldwide
- Key people: Deremi Atanda (Managing director)
- Services: Payment service provider; Payment processing; Payment gateway; Mobile Payment
- Parent: SystemSpecs

Remita is a financial services platform owned by SystemSpecs, a financial services company headquartered in Lagos, Nigeria.

It was the gateway for the treasury single account of the Nigerian government starting in 2012. In 2025, the government added Treasury Management and Revenue Assurance.

== See also ==
- List of online payment service providers
- Electronic commerce
- Payment gateway
- Payment service provider
