= Ogunbiyi =

Ogunbiyi is a surname. Notable people with the surname include:

- Babajide Ogunbiyi (born 1986), American soccer player
- Biodun Ogunbiyi, Nigerian politician
- Clara Bata Ogunbiyi (born 1948), Nigerian jurist
- Damilola Ogunbiyi, Nigerian government minister
- Mouritala Ogunbiyi (born 1982), Nigerian footballer
- Temitayo Ogunbiyi (born 1984), American artist
