= Abiodun Richards Adejola =

Nigerian diplomat

Abiodun Richard Adejola

Permanent Representative of Nigeria to the United Nations, Geneva
- Preceded by: Tijjani Muhammad-Bande

Personal details
- Born: 23 December 1964 (age 61) Ogun state
- Spouse: Arinola Olufunke Adejola
- Children: 2

Abiodun Richards Adejola (born 23 December 1964 in Ogun) is a Nigerian diplomat and Nigeria’s Permanent Representative to the United Nations in Geneva, Switzerland. He assumed the office in February 2021, taking over from Tijjani Muhammad-Bande.

== Education ==
Adejola holds a bachelor’s and a master's Degree in International Relations. He has participated in certificate courses in Diplomacy and International Relations at the Foreign Service Academy in Lagos, Nigeria and at the United Nations in New York, United States of America.

== Career ==
Adejola joined the Nigerian Foreign Service in October 1993. He was the best graduating student-officer of the 12th Regular Course of the Nigerian Foreign Service Academy in 1994. He has served in different postings of both the bilateral and multilateral categories of diplomatic missions. He has served at the United Nations Headquarters in New York, at the High Commission of Nigeria, London as well as the Nigerian High Commission in Port of Spain, Trinidad and Tobago.

In February 2021 assumed office as Permanent Representative of Nigeria to the United Nations and Other International Organisations in Geneva, presenting his Letter of Credence to the Director-General of the UN Office in Geneva in June 2021. Until his posting to Geneva, Adejola was the Chargé d’Affaires ad intermim at the Embassy of the Federal Republic of Nigeria to the Federal Democratic Republic of Ethiopia, and the Nigerian Permanent Mission to the African Union and the United Nations Economic Commission for Africa in Addis Ababa, Ethiopia.
