= Abdulmumini =

Abdulmumini may refer to:

- Abdulmumini Aminu (born 1949), retired Nigerian army colonel
- Abdulmumini Hassan Rafindadi (born 1957), Nigerian professor
- Abdulmumini Kabir Usman (born 1949), Emir of Katsina
- Abdulmumini M. Hassan, Nigerian politician
