= Saidat =

- Gender: Female

Origin
- Origin: Arabic
- Meaning: Happy and fortunate

Other names
- Variant form: Sayed

Saidat is a feminine given name of Arabic Origin meaning happy and fortunate. It is the female version of Sayed. Saidat is a common name among Nigerian Muslims.

== Notable people bearing the name ==
- Saidat Onanuga (born 1974), Nigerian track athlete
- Saidat Adegoke (born 1985), Nigerian footballer
