= General debate of the seventy-fourth session of the United Nations General Assembly =

74th session of the United Nations General Assembly

- 24 – 30 September 2019 74th session 74th general debate

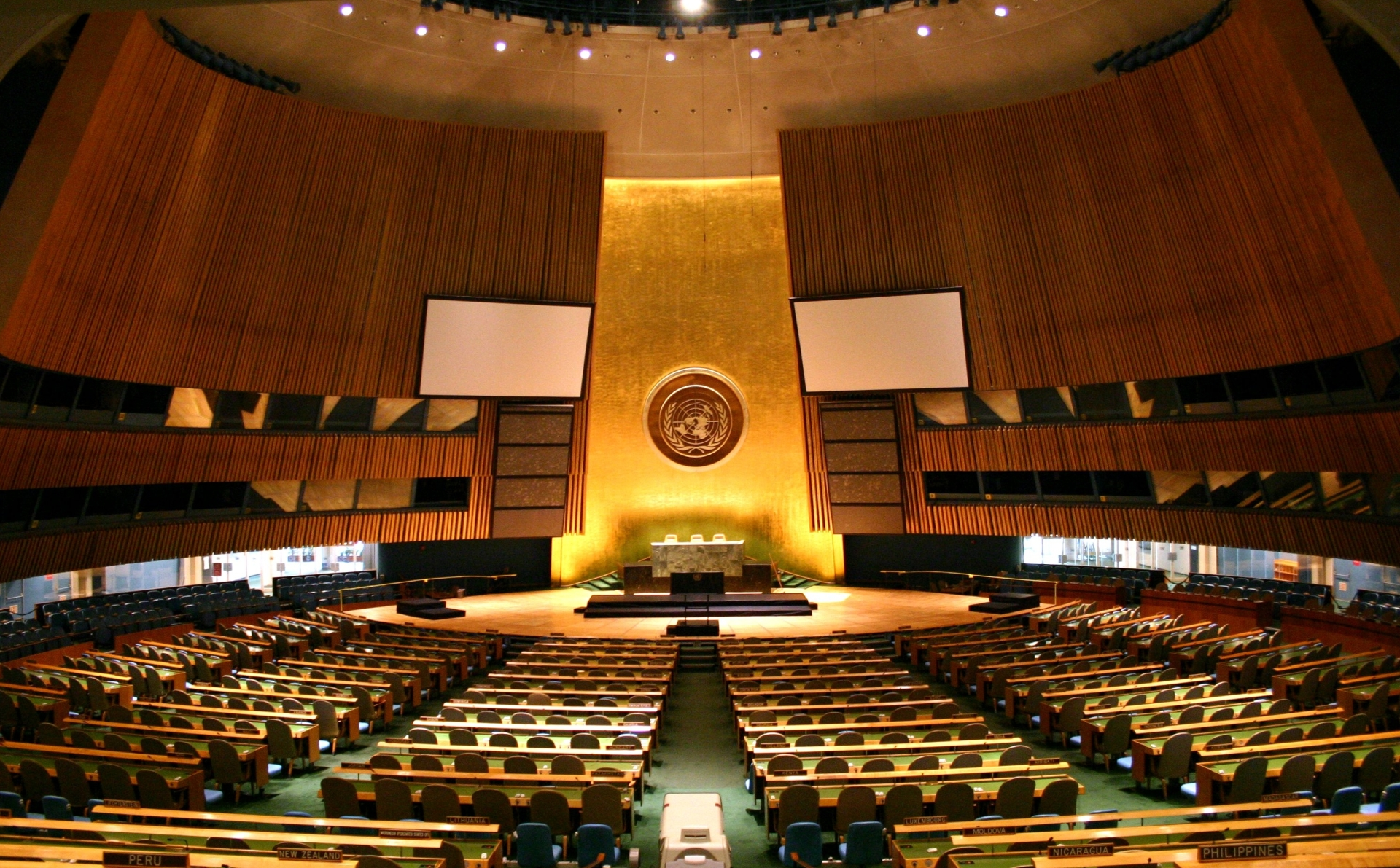
- General Assembly Hall at United Nations Headquarters, New York City
- Host country: United Nations
- Cities: New York City, United States
- Venues: General Assembly Hall at the United Nations Headquarters
- Participants: United Nations Member States
- President: Tijjani Muhammad-Bande
- Secretary-General: António Guterres
- Website: gadebate.un.org/generaldebate74/en/

The General debate of the seventy-fourth session of the United Nations General Assembly (UNGA) opened on 24 September and ran until 30 September 2019. Leaders from a number of member states addressed the UNGA.

== Organisation and subjects ==
The order of speakers is given first to member states, then observer states and supranational bodies. Any other observers entities will have a chance to speak at the end of the debate, if they so choose. Speakers will be put on the list in the order of their request, with special consideration for ministers and other government officials of similar or higher rank. According to the rules in place for the General Debate, the statements should be in of the United Nations official languages of Arabic, Chinese, English, French, Russian or Spanish, and will be translated by the United Nations translators. Each speaker is requested to provide 20 advance copies of their statements to the conference officers to facilitate translation and to be presented at the podium. The theme for this year's debate was chosen by President Tijjani Muhammad-Bande as: "Galvanizing multilateral efforts for poverty eradication, quality education, climate action and inclusion".

== Speaking schedule ==
Since 1955, Brazil and the United States are the first and second countries to speak. Other countries follow according to a speaking schedule issued by the Secretariat.

The list of speakers is provided by both the daily UN Journal, while changes in order are also reflected by the UNGA General Debate website.

=== 24 September ===
==== Morning session ====
- United Nations – Secretary-General António Guterres (Report of the UN Secretary-General)
- United Nations – 74th Session of the United Nations General Assembly - President Tijjani Muhammad-Bande (Opening statement)
- Brazil – President Jair Bolsonaro (Note: First speech to the UNGA General Debate.)
- United States – President Donald Trump
- Egypt – President Abdel Fattah el-Sisi
- Turkey – President Recep Tayyip Erdoğan
- Nigeria – President Muhammadu Buhari
- Maldives – President Ibrahim Mohamed Solih
- Qatar – Emir Tamim bin Hamad Al Thani
- Switzerland – President Ueli Maurer
- Croatia – President Kolinda Grabar-Kitarović
- Bolivia – President Evo Morales
- Jordan – King Abdullah II bin Al-Hussein
- South Korea – President Moon Jae-in
- Burkina Faso – President Roch Marc Christian Kaboré
- France – President Emmanuel Macron (Scheduled)
- Chile – President Sebastián Piñera
- France – President Emmanuel Macron
- Bosnia and Herzegovina – Chairman of the Presidency Željko Komšić

==== Evening session ====
- Angola – President João Lourenço
- Portugal – President Marcelo Rebelo de Sousa
- Rwanda – President Paul Kagame
- Finland – President Sauli Niinistö
- Monaco – Prince Albert II
- Niger – President Mahamadou Issoufou
- Netherlands – King Willem-Alexander
- Argentina – President Mauricio Macri
- Latvia – President Egils Levits
- Slovakia – President Zuzana Čaputová
- Kazakhstan – President Kassym-Jomart Tokayev
- Poland – President Andrzej Duda
- Marshall Islands – President Hilda Heine (Scheduled)
- Liechtenstein – Regent Alois von und zu Liechtenstein
- Peru – President Martín Vizcarra
- Senegal – President Macky Sall
- Italy – Prime Minister Giuseppe Conte
- Spain – Prime Minister Pedro Sánchez
- New Zealand – Prime Minister Jacinda Ardern
- Japan – Prime Minister Shinzo Abe
- United Kingdom – Prime Minister Boris Johnson
- Morocco – Prime Minister Saadeddine Othmani

==== Right of Reply ====
Member states have the option to reply to comments on the day (or even to the days prior), but are limited to 10 minutes for the first response and five minutes for the second response. All speeches are made from the floor, as opposed to the podium for the General Debate.

=== 25 September ===
==== Morning session ====
- Ukraine – President Volodymyr Zelenskyy
- Romania – President Klaus Iohannis
- Iraq – President Barham Salih
- Eswatini – King Mswati III (Scheduled)
- Liberia – President George Weah
- Iran – President Hassan Rouhani (Scheduled)
- Lebanon – President Michel Aoun
- Eswatini – King Mswati III
- Iran – President Hassan Rouhani
- Palau – President Tommy Remengesau Jr.
- Georgia – President Salome Zourabichvili
- Central African Republic – President Faustin-Archange Touadera
- Colombia – President Iván Duque Márquez
- Seychelles – President Danny Faure
- Mauritania – President Mohamed Ould Ghazouani
- Estonia – President Kersti Kaljulaid
- Guinea – President Alpha Condé
- Zambia – President Edgar Lungu
- Chad – President Idriss Déby
- Honduras – President Juan Orlando Hernández
- Australia – Prime Minister Scott Morrison
- Fiji – Prime Minister Frank Bainimarama

==== Evening session ====
- Ecuador – President Lenín Moreno
- Guatemala – President Jimmy Morales
- Kenya – President Uhuru Kenyatta
- Namibia – President Hage Geingob
- Panama – President Laurentino Cortizo
- Costa Rica – President Carlos Alvarado Quesada
- Libya – Chairman of the Presidential Council Fayez al-Sarraj
- Ghana – President Nana Akufo-Addo
- Lithuania – President Gitanas Nausėda
- Ireland – President Michael D. Higgins
- Mali – President Ibrahim Boubacar Keita
- Kiribati – President Taneti Mamau
- Zimbabwe – President Emmerson Mnangagwa
- Kuwait – Prime Minister Jaber Al-Mubarak Al-Hamad Al-Sabah
- Armenia – Prime Minister Nikol Pashinyan
- Czech Republic – Prime Minister Andrej Babiš
- Andorra – Prime Minister Xavier Espot Zamora
- Germany – Foreign Minister Heiko Maas

=== 26 September ===
==== Morning session ====
- Tonga – King Tupou VI
- Cyprus – President Nicos Anastasiades
- Ethiopia – President Sahle-Work Zewde (Scheduled)
- Serbia – President Aleksandar Vučić
- Bulgaria – President Rumen Radev
- Democratic Republic of the Congo – President Félix Tshisekedi (Scheduled)
- Sierra Leone – President Julius Maada Bio
- Serbia – President Aleksandar Vučić (Scheduled)
- Democratic Republic of the Congo – President Félix Tshisekedi
- El Salvador – President Nayib Bukele (Scheduled)
- Moldova – President Igor Dodon
- Sierra Leone – President Julius Maada Bio (Scheduled)
- Côte d'Ivoire – Vice-President Daniel Kablan Duncan
- Somalia – President Mohamed Abdullahi Mohamed (Scheduled)
- Palestine – President Mahmoud Abbas
- Moldova – President Igor Dodon (Scheduled)
- Ethiopia – President Sahle-Work Zewde
- Palestine – President Mahmoud Abbas (Scheduled)
- European Union – President of the European Council Donald Tusk
- Somalia – President Mohamed Abdullahi Mohamed
- Suriname – Vice-President Ashwin Adhin (Scheduled)
- El Salvador – President Nayib Bukele
- Côte d'Ivoire – Vice-President Daniel Kablan Duncan (Scheduled)
- Suriname – Vice-President Ashwin Adhin
- Gambia – Vice-President Isatou Touray (Scheduled)
- Belgium – Prime Minister Charles Michel
- Luxembourg – Prime Minister Xavier Bettel

==== Evening session ====
- Montenegro – President Milo Đukanović
- Sao Tome and Principe – President Evaristo Carvalho
- Comoros – President Azali Assoumani
- Nauru – President Lionel Aingimea
- Micronesia – President David Panuelo
- Malawi – President Peter Mutharika
- Dominica – President Charles Savarin
- Djibouti – President Ismaïl Omar Guelleh
- South Sudan – First Vice-President Taban Deng Gai
- Gambia – Vice-President Isatou Touray
- Malta – Prime Minister Joseph Muscat (Scheduled)
- North Macedonia – Prime Minister Zoran Zaev
- Israel – Foreign Minister Israel Katz
- Austria (Scheduled)
- Hungary – Foreign Minister Péter Szijjártó
- Austria – Foreign Minister Alexander Schallenberg
- Saudi Arabia – Foreign Minister Ibrahim Abdulaziz Al-Assaf
- Belarus – Foreign Minister Vladimir Makei
- Denmark – Foreign Minister Jeppe Kofod
- Malta – Prime Minister Joseph Muscat
- Tunisia (Scheduled)
- Cameroon – Foreign Minister Lejeune Mbella Mbella
- Dominican Republic – Foreign Minister Miguel Vargas
- Gabon – Foreign Minister Alain Claude Bilie By Nze

=== 27 September ===
==== Morning session ====
- Mauritius – President Barlen Vyapoory
- Indonesia – Vice-President Jusuf Kalla
- Lesotho – Prime Minister Tom Thabane
- India – Prime Minister Narendra Modi
- Norway – Prime Minister Erna Solberg (Scheduled)
- Singapore – Prime Minister Lee Hsien Loong
- Pakistan – Prime Minister Imran Khan (Scheduled)
- Slovenia – Prime Minister Marjan Šarec
- Pakistan – Prime Minister Imran Khan
- Jamaica – Prime Minister Andrew Holness (Scheduled)
- Greece – Prime Minister Kyriakos Mitsotakis
- Slovenia – Prime Minister Marjan Šarec (Scheduled)
- Jamaica – Prime Minister Andrew Holness
- Barbados – Prime Minister Mia Mottley (Scheduled)
- Tajikistan – Prime Minister Kokhir Rasulzoda
- Albania – Prime Minister Edi Rama (Scheduled)
- Greece – Prime Minister Kyriakos Mitsotakis (Scheduled)
- Norway – Prime Minister Erna Solberg
- Barbados – Prime Minister Mia Mottley
- Albania – Prime Minister Edi Rama
- The Bahamas – Prime Minister Hubert Minnis
- Saint Kitts and Nevis – Prime Minister Timothy Harris
- China – State Councilor and Foreign Minister Wang Yi
- Russia – Foreign Minister Sergey Lavrov
- Algeria – Foreign Minister Sabri Boukadoum
- Solomon Islands – Foreign Minister Jeremiah Manele
- Tunisia – Foreign Minister Khemaies Jhinaoui

==== Evening session ====
- Venezuela – Former Vice-President (Disputed) Delcy Rodríguez
- Cape Verde – Prime Minister Ulisses Correia e Silva
- Malaysia – Prime Minister Mahathir Mohamad
- Saint Lucia – Prime Minister Allen Chastanet
- Samoa – Prime Minister Tuilaepa Aiono Sailele Malielegaoi
- Vanuatu – Prime Minister Charlot Salwai
- Bangladesh – Prime Minister Sheikh Hasina
- Antigua and Barbuda – Prime Minister Gaston Browne
- Trinidad and Tobago – Prime Minister Keith Rowley
- Saint Vincent and the Grenadines – Prime Minister Ralph Gonsalves
- Sudan – Prime Minister Abdalla Hamdok
- Paraguay – Foreign Minister Antonio Rivas Palacios
- Iceland – Foreign Minister Guðlaugur Þór Þórðarson
- Nepal – Foreign Minister Pradeep Kumar Gyawali
- Tanzania – Foreign Minister Palamagamba Kabudi
- Papua New Guinea – Foreign Minister Soroi Eoe
- Equatorial Guinea – Foreign Minister Simeón Oyono Esono Angüe

=== 28 September ===
==== Morning session ====
- Bhutan – Prime Minister Lotay Tshering
- Uganda – Prime Minister Ruhakana Rugunda
- Madagascar – Prime Minister Christian Ntsay
- Holy See – Secretary of State Pietro Parolin
- Vietnam – Deputy Prime Minister Phạm Bình Minh
- Cambodia – Deputy Prime Minister Prak Sokhonn
- Syria – Deputy Prime Minister Walid Muallem
- Tuvalu – Deputy Prime Minister Minute Tapuo
- Kyrgyzstan – Foreign Minister Chingiz Aidarbekov
- Cuba – Foreign Minister Bruno Rodríguez Parrilla
- San Marino – Foreign Secretary Nicola Renzi
- Sweden – Foreign Minister Ann Linde
- Mexico – Foreign Minister Marcelo Ebrard
- Botswana – Foreign Minister Unity Dow
- South Africa – Foreign Minister Naledi Pandor
- Grenada – Foreign Minister Peter David
- Marshall Islands – Foreign Minister John Silk
- Guinea-Bissau – Foreign Minister Suzi Barbosa
- Bahrain – Foreign Minister Khalid bin Ahmed Al Khalifa

==== Evening session ====
- United Arab Emirates – Foreign Minister Abdullah bin Zayed Al Nahyan
- Oman – Minister Responsible for Foreign Affairs Yusuf bin Alawi bin Abdullah
- Turkmenistan – Vice-President Raşit Meredow
- Laos – Foreign Minister Saleumxay Kommasith
- Belize – Foreign Minister Wilfred Elrington
- Philippines – Foreign Secretary Teodoro Locsin Jr.
- Azerbaijan – Foreign Minister Elmar Mammadyarov
- Myanmar – Minister of the State Counsellor's Office Kyaw Tint Swe
- Mongolia – Foreign Minister Damdin Tsogtbaatar
- Mozambique – Foreign Minister José Condungua Pacheco
- Guyana – Foreign Minister Karen Cummings
- Nicaragua – Foreign Minister Denis Moncada
- Yemen – Foreign Minister Mohammed Abdullah Al-Hadhrami
- Haiti – Foreign Minister Bocchit Edmond
- Congo – Foreign Minister Jean-Claude Gakosso

=== 30 September ===
==== Morning session ====
- Eritrea – Foreign Minister Osman Saleh Mohammed
- Brunei (Scheduled)
- Burundi – Foreign Minister Ezechiel Nibigira
- Brunei – Second Foreign Minister Erywan Yusof
- Togo (Scheduled)
- Uruguay – Foreign Minister Rodolfo Nin Novoa
- Thailand – Foreign Minister Don Pramudwinai
- Burundi (Scheduled)
- Uruguay (Scheduled)
- East Timor – Foreign Minister Dionísio Babo
- North Korea – Permanent Representative Kim Song
- Afghanistan – National Security Advisor Hamdullah Mohib
- Canada (Scheduled)
- Togo – Permanent Representative Kokou Kpayedo
- Benin (Scheduled)
- Canada – Permanent Representative Marc-André Blanchard
- Benin – Permanent Representative Jean-Claude Félix do Rego
- Sri Lanka – Foreign Secretary Ravinatha Aryasinha
- No representative for Uzbekistan was on the agenda of the General Debate.

== See also ==
- List of UN General Assembly sessions
- List of General debates of the United Nations General Assembly
