= Bamidele Solomon =

Nigerian academic (1955–2023)

Professor Bamidele Solomon

Director General and Chief Executive Officer National Biotechnology Development Agency (NABDA)
- In office 2005–2013
- Succeeded by: Lucy Jumeyi Ogbadu

Head of Department of Chemical Engineering Ladoke Akintola University of Technology
- In office 2000–2004

Deputy Dean, Faculty of Technology Obafemi Awolowo University
- In office 1984–1994

Personal details
- Born: 7 July 1955 Idofin-Isanlu, Kogi State
- Died: May 10, 2023 (aged 67)
- Education: Kansas State University
- Occupation: chemical engineer, academic

Bamidele Ogbe Solomon (7 July 1955, Idofin-Isanlu, Kogi State – 10 May 2023) was a Nigerian academic and professor of chemical engineering. He was a prominent figure in the Nigeria's biotechnology policy formulation and was the Director General and Chief Executive Officer of National Biotechnology Development Agency (NABDA) for two terms, from 2005 - 2013.

== Early life and education ==
Bamidele Solomon was born in 1955 in Idofin-Isanlu, Kwara State (now in Kogi State). He started his secondary education at ECWA Secondary School, Mopa, Kogi State, where he studied from 1968 to 1972 before transferring to Federal Government College, Sokoto in 1973, graduating with an O'Level certificate in 1974. In 1975, he enrolled at Kansas State University as a Scholar of the Federal Republic of Nigeria (scholarship). He received a Post-graduate Fellowship from the Department of Chemical Engineering, Kansas State University where he concluded his studies with a PhD in chemical and biochemical engineering in 1983.

== Career ==
Solomon started his academic career in 1980 as a temporary instructor at Kansas State University and served there until 1983, when he returned to Nigeria. Following his return, he participated in the mandatory one-year National Youth Service Corps (NYSC), passing out in 1984. He taught chemical engineering at Obafemi Awolowo University, Ile-Ife, from 1984 to 1994 and served as Deputy Dean, Faculty of Technology. During this period, he worked in other institutions, including at the Federal University of Technology, Akure, where he was an associate lecturer in biochemical engineering (genetic engineering) from 1989 to 1992.

In 1992, Solomon received a two-year equipment grant of DM44,000.00 as a research fellowship from the Alexander von Humboldt Foundation to conduct research in process modeling and parameter estimation at GBF (National Institute for Biotechnology), Braunschweig, Germany. He was awarded a research grant of $10,600.00 by the International Foundation for Science, Sweden, (1994). In 1995, Solomon was awarded a Fellowship by the South African Government Research Council to conduct preliminary fermentation runs on genetically engineered yeasts at the University of Stellenbosch. He joined Ladoke Akintola University of Technology as an associate lecturer in chemical engineering in 1995 and rose to the rank of Head of Department of Chemical Engineering in 2000 and served in this position until 2004.

He was a consultant with several private and public organisations including Mobil Producing Nigeria, NNPC, International Brewery Limited, Chevron, Nigerian Society of Chemical Engineers, and federal ministries of Solid Minerals, Environment, and Science and Technology. He was a prominent figure in the advocacy for the passage of the Biosafety bill which established the National Biosafety Management Agency (NBMA). Solomon served as Director General and Chief Executive Officer of National Biotechnology Development Agency for two terms from 2005 – 2013.

== Selected publications ==
- Statistical Estimation of Yield and Maintenance Parameters Associated with Microbial Growth
- National Biotechnology Status Survey, 2008
- Cultivation of Selected Tropical Edible Mushroom: A Hands-on Manual
- Properties of Biodiesel Feedstock as an Effective Ecofuel Source and Their Challenges
- Biomass Yields and Maintenance Requirements for growth on Carbohydrates
- Development of Malt for the Nigerian Brewing Industries: Malting of Grain Sorghum
- Microbial Conversion of Maize and Sorghum Dusts to High Protein Food
- Evaluation of Microbial Systems for Bioremediation of Petroleum Refinery Effluents in Nigeria
- Utilization of Airlift Fermenters in the Mass Propagation of Pseudomonas and Aureobasidium Species for the Bioremediation of Crude Oil Polluted Aquatic Environments
- Physicochemical Characterization of Delonox Regia Oil and Heterogeneous Catalyst Synthesis from the Husk for Biodiesel Production using Response Surface Methodology (RSM) Design Approach
- Optimization of process variables for microbial degradation of phenol by binary mixed culture of Pseudomonas aeruginosa and Pseudomonas fluorescens using response surface methodology
- Influencing Politicians and Policy Makers to Pave Way for a Viable Biotechnology Sector: A Case Study of the Nigerian Biosafety Bill Drafting, Passage, Experiences and Lessons Learnt" in Biotechnology for Africa
