= Treasury single account =

Treasury Single Account (TSA) is a government financial policy to use a single bank account for all inflows of funds from all government agencies. The policy is in use in several countries around the world. Such a unified structure is recommended by the IMF, as all government funds are collected in one account which could reduce borrowing costs, extend credit and improve government's fiscal policy among other benefits to government. The IMF also recommends the establishment of a legal basis to ensure its robustness and stability.

It was proposed by the federal government of Nigeria in 2012 under the Jonathan Administration and was fully implemented by the Buhari Administration. to consolidate all inflows from all agencies of government into a single account at the Central Bank of Nigeria.

== History ==
Efficient management and control of government's cash resources rely on government banking arrangements. Nigeria, like many middle income countries, employed fragmented systems in handling government receipts and payments up to 2012. The introduction of the Treasury Single Account policy therefore was vital in reducing the proliferation of bank accounts operated by ministries, departments and agencies (MDAs) towards promoting financial accountability among governmental organs. The compliance of the policy in Nigeria created challenges for the majority of the MDAs. Commercial banks in Nigeria remitted over 2 trillion Naira worth of idle and active governments deposits with full implementation of this policy in 2016. Meanwhile, the bankers' committee of the country has declared their support for the policy. Through Remita, the integrated electronic payments and collections platform developed by a company called [http://www.systemspecs.com.ng SystemSpecs, the TSA initiative has enabled the Federal Government of Nigeria to take full control of over 3 trillion Naira ($15 billion) of its cash assets as at the end of the first quarter of 2016.

== Reactions to the introduction of Treasury Single Account ==
The operation of the Treasury Single Account in Nigeria has not been without controversies. On Tuesday, 10 November 2015, Dino Melaye, a Nigerian senator representing Kogi West, raised a motion that the operation of the treasury single account (TSA) be investigated for possible corruption. He claimed that "the appointment of REMITA, an e-collection agent, is a gross violation of section 162 (1) of the Nigerian Constitution and the banks and other Financial Institutions Act." He claimed the constitution only recognised a banking institution to be the collector of government funds, that Remita was not a bank. The provision of the Constitution cited by Melaye states, “the federation shall maintain a special account to be called the federation account into which all revenues collected by the government of the federation except the proceeds from the personal income tax of the personnel of the Armed Forces of the Federation, the Nigeria Police Force, the ministry or department of government charged with foreign affairs and the residents of the FCT, Abuja.” According to Melaye, the total inflow of 1% commission charged and received by SystemSpecs for all revenue collected on behalf of the government from the various ministries, departments and agencies to be 25 billion Naira as of November 2015 was fraud and must be returned to the account of the Central Bank of Nigeria. The senate consequently ordered its committee on finance and public accounts to "commence an investigation into the use of Remita (which it erroneously described as an e-collection agent) since the inception of the TSA policy.

Ayo Fayose, Governor of Ekiti State, introduced a political angle to the controversy when he alleged that the funds collected through of TSA were used to finance governorship elections in Bayelsa and Kogi States by the All Progressives Congress, apart from enriching "a single company in one month." 25 billion Naira is the negotiated commission of one per cent of 2.5 trillion Naira - total amount of monies collected by Remita for the Federal Government of Nigeria. However, the Federal Government of Nigeria through the office of The Minister of Information and Culture Lai Mohammed debunked the opinion that the TSA policy was not intended to loot the Nigeria treasury. The minister in his statement attempted to absolve the administration of President Muhammadu Buhari when he claimed that the TSA contract was signed during the administration of President Goodluck Jonathan The CBN in an attempt to justify their position released a letter to the press titled “Commencement of Federal Government independent revenue collection under the Treasury Single Account (TSA) initiative”. In the letter, the CBN debunked all the allegations made by Melaye as being misleading. At the height of the controversy, the Central Bank of Nigeria (CBN), instructed SystemSpecs to return of all the revenues made so far on the contract, a directive, which SystemSpecs obeyed without delay as a "business decision".

In a letter reportedly written to President Muhammadu Buhari by John Obaro, Founder and Managing Director of SystemSpecs, developers of the Remita application, the allegation that SystemSpecs pocketed 25 billion Naira was refuted. Obaro explained that the one per cent commission was negotiated prior to the signing of the contract; and the one per cent commission was shared by SystemSpecs, participating commercial banks and the Central Bank of Nigeria in the ratio of 50:40:10 respectively. According to findings by PremiumTimes,'Remita' is not "an agency" but an application/software for executing payment instructions and collection of government revenue. The software facilitates the payment of government revenue from financial institutions to a TSA in the CBN. The report cited holes in Melaye's accusations and termed them "misleading." The Joint Senate investigative committee absolved SystemSpecs of any wrongdoing, as “the committee could not ascertain the deduction/collection of twenty-five billion Naira (N25 billion) by SystemSpecs as 1% fee charged for the use of its Remita platform within the period under investigation.” This was contained in section 6.1.16 on pages 16 and 17 of the committee’s report.
