= Ogan =

Ogan may refer to:

- Ogan (surname)
- Ogan Ilir Regency
- Ogan Komering Ilir Regency
- Ogan Komering Ulu Regency
- East Ogan Komering Ulu Regency
- South Ogan Komering Ulu Regency
- Ogan River, in South Sumatra, Indonesia
- Ogan, a dialect of South Barisan Malay
- Ogan script
- Ogham, a medieval alphabet used to write the early Irish language
