= Ahmed Tijjani Mora =

Nigerian pharmacist and academic

Prof. Ahmed Tijjani Mora, FPSN, FPC.Pharm, FICEN, Ph.D, FNIM, mni, OON
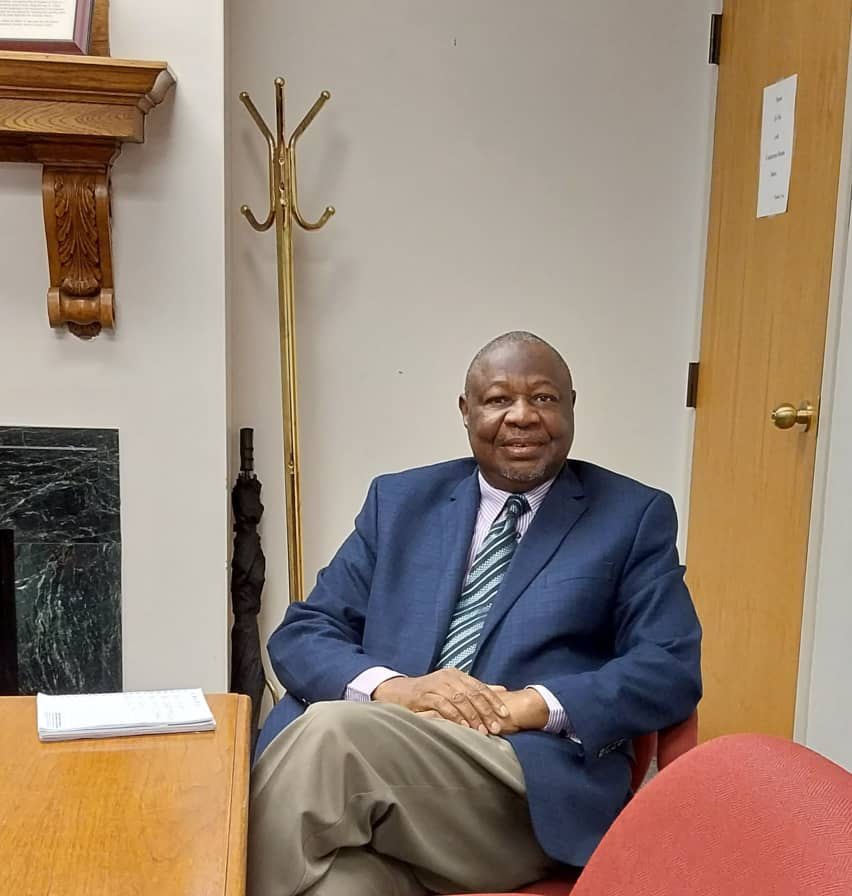

Chairman of the Governing Council of Pharmacy Council of Nigeria
- In office June, 2020 – June, 2023
- President: Muhammadu Buhari
- Preceded by: Pharm Bruno Nwankwo

Registrar and Chief Executive Officer of the then Pharmacists Council of Nigeria
- In office 2003–2012

President of the Ahmadu Bello University Alumni
- In office August 2015 – February 2021

Personal details
- Born: Tijjani Mora; 13 May 1956 (age 70)
- Education: Usmanu Danfodiyo University (Ph.D); Ahmadu Bello University (MBA)
- Awards: Officer of the Order of Niger
- Scientific career
- Fields: Pharmacy
- Workplaces: Pharmacy Council of Nigeria, Igbinedion University, Ahmadu Bello University

Ahmed Tijjani Mora (OON) (born May 13, 1956) is a Nigerian pharmacist, academic, former Registrar and now Chairman of the Governing Council of Pharmacy Council of Nigeria. He is the National President, Ahmadu Bello University Alumni Association. He was elected President of the Alumni Association in August 2015 at the Annual General Assembly (AGA) of the association. The assembly was attended by delegates from over 25 States. Prior to his election, he was the substantive Deputy National president of the association.

He succeeded Princess Henrietta Ogan, the immediate past president of the association. He was the pioneer Director of Pharmaceutical Services in the Ministry of Health, Kaduna State and also the pioneer Dean of the Faculty of Pharmaceutical Sciences, Kaduna State University (KSU) since he joined the university in 2012.

In addition to his contributions to the field of pharmacy and academics, he is also a pundit and health advocate. In May 2009, during the opening of the workshop on records management organized by the then Pharmacists Council of Nigeria in the Northern region of Kaduna state, he lamented on the activities and incessant increased in numbers of unregistered patent medicine vendors and the risk it posed on the heath of the people in Kaduna State.

Tijjani was among the top Northern professional published by Leadership Newspaper in September 2013.

== Background ==
Tijjani Mora was born on 13 May 1956 to the family of the late Dr. Abdurrahman Mora in Zaria, a major city and a local government area in Kaduna State, Northern Nigeria. He attended Barewa College in Zaria where he obtained the West African School Certificate in 1974 before he received a bachelor's degree in Pharmacy from Ahmadu Bello University, Zaria in 1978. He obtained an MBA from the same university in 1985 and a doctorate degree in management study from Usmanu Danfodiyo University. The MBA and PhD are with bias to Pharmaceutical Marketing and Drug Distribution respectively.

Other courses were undergone at Administrative Staff College of Nigeria, Harvard University, Liverpool Hope University and National Institute of Policy and Strategic Studies for a Senior Executive Course (SEC 32/2010).

He became a Fellow of the West African Postgraduate College of Pharmacists (FPC Pharm.) in 2002.

== Career ==
He began his academic career in 1986 as a Lecturer II in the Department of Pharmaceutics and Pharmaceutical Microbiology, Ahmadu Bello University, Zaria where he rose to the position of a Senior Lecturer in 2001. He was a member of the Faculty Board of Pharmaceutical Science in the Faculty between 1988 and 2003. In October 2003, he was appointed through the interview process as Registrar and chief executive officer of the Pharmacists Council of Nigeria. He held the position for 9 years. In 2012, he joined the services of Kaduna State University, as Foundation Dean. He was also appointed as member of many academic Committees and member of Management Committee in the university. He was the pioneer Head, Department of Clinical Pharmacy and Pharmacy Management (2012 - 2016). He returned to Ahmadu Bello University, Zaria to continue his part-time lecturing. He has lectured in this university for over 36 years "pro-bono"

He is the first Nigerian pharmacy practitioner to practice in the four (4) core areas of pharmacy and reaching the top in each area.

On 2 August 2016, he was appointed visiting professor at the Department of Clinical Pharmacy and Pharmacy Practice of the College of Pharmacy, Igbinedion University, Edo State; with the major responsibility of supervising and mentoring postgraduate and undergraduate students of the university's College of Pharmacy".

He became the first Professor of Pharmacy Practice in Igbinedion University, Okada (IUO) and in Nigeria.

=== Public services ===
In June 1980, he was appointed as Northern pharmaceutical representative at Grünenthal GmbH, a German Pharmaceutical manufacturing Company. He served in that capacity for 3 years before his appointment as pioneer Pharmaceutical Divisional Manager for the Kaduna State Distribution Agency Ltd in January 1986. He held the position till May 1988, the same year he was appointed as Chief Pharmacist and Head of Pharmacy Department of the Health Management Board, Kaduna State. He served in that position for 2 years and was in charge of Pharmacy Department of the general hospitals in the State.

In May 1990, he was appointed by the Kaduna State Government as pioneer Director of Pharmaceutical Services in the Ministry of Health, Kaduna State and held the position till August 1993. During this period, he initiated the syringe manufacturing plants initiative of Zaria Pharmaceutical Co. (ZPC) Ltd. While serving in this capacity, he became the pioneer Project Manager for the ADB-ADF-Assisted Kaduna Health Rehabilitation Project between 1993 and 1998 at the Project Implementation Unit (PIU), Kaduna State Ministry of Health.

In March 1997, he was appointed as managing director and chief executive officer of Zaria Pharmaceutical Company Ltd (manufacturers of ZARINJECT disposable syringes). Following the completion of his tenure in November 1999, he was appointed as managing director and chief executive officer of Zazzau Pharmaceutical Industry Ltd in 2000 (manufacturers of solid and liquid pharmaceutical products). He held the position till September 2003.

During his tenure as the Registrar and chief executive officer of the Pharmacists Council of Nigeria, he repositioned the council and a decentralized process of regulatory and control mechanism for the practice of pharmacy in Nigeria was devised. He created forty (40) additional offices nation-wide including five in Minna, Bauchi, Ibadan, Uyo and Kaduna which he constructed from foundation to commissioning. Upon his appointment, there were only four (4) offices.

In recognition of his immense contributions to health in Kaduna State, he was bestowed with the Chieftaincy title of Wakilin Maganin Zazzau of the Zazzau Emirate. The title was bestowed on him by the Emir of Zazzau and chairman, Kaduna State Council of Chiefs, Alhaji Shehu Idris. He was turbaned at the Emir Palace on September 27, 2013. In April 2021, His Eminence, Alhaji Muhammad Sa'ad Abubakar, CFR, mni, the Sultan of Sokoto appointed him as "Kayayen Sarkin Musulmi" in the Sultan's Palace, Sokoto.

In June 2020, he was inaugurated as the chairman of Pharmacists Council of Nigeria by President Muhammadu Buhari, GCFR represented by the Minister of Health, Osagie Ehanire.

In April 2022, he was appointed as a member of the governing council, Igbinedion University

In the year 2023, Tijjani Mora was awarded a national honor, the Order of the Niger(OON) alongside 238 other notable Nigerians, and he's the only pharmacist to have received the honor in 2023.

In January 2025, he was appointed as a board member of the Institute of Human Virology.

== Awards and fellowships ==
Awards received by Mora include:

1. Eminent Persons Award of the Nigerian Association of Industrial Pharmacists (NAIP) (1998);
2. Fellow and Industrial Leadership Award of the Institute of Corporate Administration of Nigeria (1998);
3. Fellow, Pharmaceutical Society of Nigeria (FPSN) (1997)

Fellow, West African Postgraduate College of Pharmacists (FPC.Pharm) (2002);

1. Nominated as the most distinguished Alumnus of the history of the Faculty of Pharmaceutical Sciences, ABU, Zaria at the 50th Anniversary Celebration of ABU, Zaria (2012)
- Fellow, Institute of Healthcare Management, Nigeria (FIHMN) (2012).
- Pharmaceutical Leadership Award as African Executive of the year (2009) by African Leadership magazine (2010);
- Award as Benefactor of the Faculty of Pharmaceutical Sciences, ABU, Zaria (2004);
- Golden Leadership Icon Award by Presidential Diary Magazine (2021)

== See also ==
List of Ahmadu Bello University alumni

Political offices
Preceded by Pharm. Bruno Nwankwo	Pharmacist Council of Nigeria; 2020–2023
