= Ogan (surname) =

Ogan or Oğan may refer to the following people

Given name

Surname

- Alain Saint-Ogan (1895–1974), French comics author and artist
- Billy Ogan (born 1966), Thai actor and singer-songwriter
- Cathal mac Ógán, Medieval Gael from Ireland
- Henrietta Ogan, Nigerian business administrator
- İsmail Ogan (1933–2022), Turkish wrestler
- Lynne Coy-Ogan, American academic administrator
- Sarah Ogan Gunning (1910–1983), American singer-songwriter
- Scott Ogan (born 1952), American politician and businessman
- Sinan Oğan (born 1967), Turkish politician
