= Seventy-fourth session of the United Nations General Assembly =

United Nations Assembly

- 17 September 2019 – 16 September 2020 74th session 74th general debate
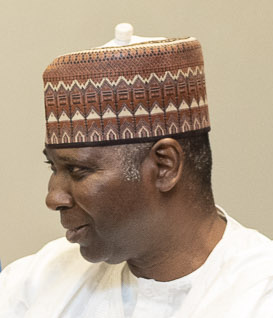
- President of the 74th General Assembly Tijjani Muhammad-Bande
- Host country: United Nations
- Cities: New York City, United States
- Venues: General Assembly Hall at the United Nations Headquarters
- Participants: United Nations Member States
- President: Tijjani Muhammad-Bande
- Secretary-General: António Guterres
- Website: www.un.org/en/ga/74

The Seventy-fourth session of the United Nations General Assembly was the session of the United Nations General Assembly which was opened on 17 of September 2019 until 16 September 2020.

The theme for the 74th session was "Effective responses to global crises: strengthening multilateralism and dialogue among civilizations for international peace, security and development."

== Organisation for the session ==
=== President ===
On 4 June 2019, Nigerian diplomat and politician Tijjani Muhammad-Bande was elected by acclamation to the position of President of the General Assembly. At the time of his election, Muhammad-Bande was serving as Nigeria’s Permanent Representative to the United Nations.

In his first speech as President-elect of the General Assembly, Muhammad-Bande laid out some of his priorities for the session. Paramount among them was the need to meet the Sustainable Development Goals, with particular attention being paid to peace and security, poverty eradication, zero hunger, quality education and climate action. He also pledged to focus on the promotion of human rights, as well as the empowerment of women and youth and gender parity in the United Nations system.

=== Vice-Presidents ===
On 4 June 2019, the General Assembly elected the following countries as the vice-presidents of the 74th Session:

The five permanent members of the Security Council:

- China
- France
- Russia
- United Kingdom of Great Britain and Northern Ireland
- United States of America

As well as the following nations:

- Argentina
- Belize
- Cabo Verde
- Congo
- Croatia
- Ethiopia
- Indonesia
- Malta
- Oman
- Papua New Guinea
- Singapore
- Trinidad and Tobago
- Tunisia
- Turkey
- Uzbekistan
- Zimbabwe

=== Committees ===
The following were elected as Chairs and officers of the General Assembly's Main Committees for the 74th Session:

First Committee (Disarmament and International Security)
Name	Country	Position
H.E. Sacha Llorenty Solíz	Bolivia (Plurinational State of)	Chair
Honorine Bonkoungou	Burkina Faso	Vice-Chair
Amal Mudallali	Lebanon	Vice-Chair
Peter Horne	Australia	Vice-Chair
Szilvia Balázs	Hungary	Rapporteur

Second Committee (Economic and Financial)
Name	Country	Position
H.E. Cheikh Niang	Senegal	Chair
Ahmad Saif al-Kuwari	Qatar	Vice-Chair
Yuliana Zhivkova Angelova	Bulgaria	Vice-Chair
Anat Fisher-Tsin	Israel	Vice-Chair
David Mulet	Guatemala	Rapporteur

Third Committee (Social, Humanitarian and Cultural)
Name	Country	Position
H.E. Christian Braun	Luxembourg	Chairperson
Gail Farngalo	Liberia	Vice-Chair
Ara Margarian	Armenia	Vice-Chair
María Emilia Eyheralde	Uruguay	Vice-Chair
Firas Hassan Jabbar	Iraq	Rapporteur

Fourth Committee (Special Political and Decolonization)
Name	Country	Position
H.E. Mohammed Hussein Bahr Aluloom	Iraq	Chairperson
Ahmadou Ahidjo	Cameroon	Vice-Chair
Andrea Bacher	Austria	Vice-Chair
Peter Pindják	Slovakia	Vice-Chair
Juan Antonio Benard Estrada	Guatemala	Rapporteur

Fifth Committee (Administrative and Budgetary)
Name	Country	Position
H.E. Andreas Mavroyiannis	Cyprus	Chairperson
Mohamed Fouad Ahmed	Egypt	Vice-Chair
Giorgi Mikeladze	Georgia	Vice-Chair
Luiz Feldman (17 September – 18 October 2019)	Brazil	Vice-Chair
Thiago Poggio Padua (18 October 2019 – Present)	Brazil	Vice-Chair
Yaron Wax	Israel	Rapporteur

Sixth Committee (Legal)
Name	Country	Position
H.E. Michal Mlynár	Slovakia	Chairperson
Cecilia Anderberg	Sweden	Vice-Chair
Amadou Jaiteh	Gambia	Vice-Chair
Pablo Arrocha Olabuenaga	Mexico	Vice-Chair
Mohamed Hamad Al-Thani	Qatar	Rapporteur

=== Seat allocation ===
As is tradition before each session of the General Assembly, the Secretary-General drew lots to see which member state would occupy the first seat in the General Assembly Chamber, with the other member states following according to the English translation of their name. For the 74th Session, Ghana was selected to sit in the first seat by Secretary-General António Guterres. This same order is followed in the six main committees, as well as other United Nations bodies.

=== General Debate ===
Each member of the General Assembly had a representative speaking about issues concerning their country and the hopes for the coming year as to what the UNGA would do. This was an opportunity for the member states to opine on international issues of their concern. The General Debate occurred from the 24th of September to the 30th of September 2019.

The order of speakers is given first to member states, then observer states and supranational bodies. Any other observers entities have a chance to speak at the end of the debate if they so choose. Speakers were put on the list in the order of their request, with special consideration for ministers and other government officials of similar or higher rank. According to the rules in place for the General Debate, the statements should be in one of the United Nations official languages of Arabic, Chinese, English, French, Russian or Spanish, and will be translated by the United Nations translators. Each speaker is requested to provide 20 advance copies of their statements to the conference officers to facilitate translation and to be presented at the podium. Speeches are requested to be limited to five minutes, with seven minutes for supranational bodies.

== Resolutions ==
The following are resolutions the General Assembly has passed in its 74th session.

Resolution	Date	Plenary or Committee	Agenda Item	Vote	Passed	Topic

== See also ==
- List of UN General Assembly sessions
- List of General debates of the United Nations General Assembly
