= Musa Danladi Abubakar =

Nigerian lawyer

Justice Musa Danladi Abubakar LLB, BL, Life Bencher,
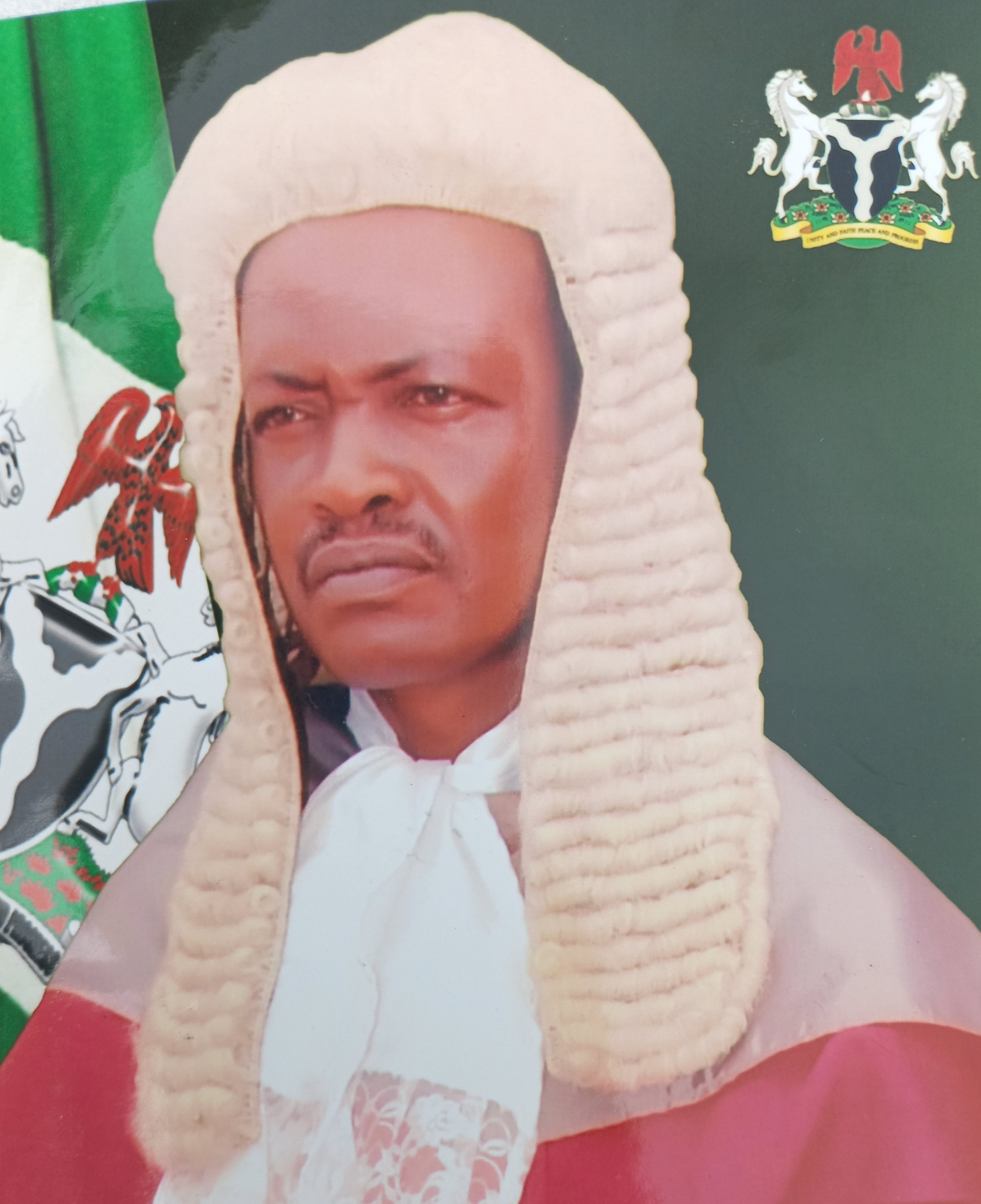
- Justice Musa Danladi Abubakar in official regalia
- Born: 21 November 1958 (age 67); Funtua
- Education: Bayero University Kano; Ahmadu Bello University
- Occupation: Lawyer
- Office: Chief Judge of Katsina State, Nigeria
- Spouses: Hajiya Jummai Musa Danladi (m. 1991; died 1996): Hajiya Hadiza Musa Danladi; Hajiya Binta Musa Danladi (m. 1981)
- Children: Yusuf, Sabiru, Abubakar, Aliyu, Abdullahi, Mustapha (deceased), Aliyu, Ummi, A’ishatu, Zahara’u, Musa, Mukhtar, Ibrahim, Yakubu, Saudatu, Amina, Umar and Safiyya
- Parents: Malam Abubakar Danladi (1906–1987) (father); Hajiya Rabi’atu Danladi (1924–1986) (mother)
- Awards: LLD by AIU, Niamey. NATIONAL PRODUCTIVITY MERIT AWARD(NPOM) by GENERAL ABDULSALAMI ABUBAKAR GCFR, FSS, DSS, mni in 1998. A member and fellow of the INTERNATIONAL DISPUTE RESOLUTION INSTITUTE

HON. Justice Musa Danladi Abubakar NPOM, LLB, BL (born 21 November 1958) is a Nigerian lawyer and current serving chief judge of Katsina State from 2018. He administered the oath of office to the former governor of Katsina State Rt. Hon. Alh. Aminu Bello Masari. He was the chairman of the Taraba State Governorship Election Petition Tribunal who declared Hajiya Aisha Jummai Alhassan of the All Progressive Congress (APC) winner of the controversial governorship election, 2015 in Taraba State.

== Early life ==
Musa Danladi Abubakar was born on 21 November 1958 to a business family in Funtua, Katsina state.

== Education ==
Abubakar started his early education at his father's home, in which he learned some basic principles of Islamic jurisprudence. He attended Aya primary School, GSS Zaria and later GSS Funtua before joining Bayero University College which metamorphosed into Bayero University Kano from 1978 to 1981. There he obtained his degree in Law and he was called to the bar in Nigerian Law School in the same year.

== Early career ==
Musa Danladi Abubakar was appointed as legal trainee and pupil state counsel involved with prosecuting cases and offering legal advice with the then Kaduna state between 1981 and 1983. He joined the services of Kaduna State College of Legal Studies, Katsina Campus as a lecturer in 1983. He switched his cadre the same year (1983–1987) to join Kaduna State Judiciary and was posted to Funtua Local Government as Magistrate and was later rose to Chief Magistrate with a duty of adjudicating in civil and criminal matters within jurisdiction of each grade. Katsina became a state in 1987 and Musa Danladi was appointed as appointed as Chief Registrar between 1988 and 1994 who was responsible in head of administration and accounting officer of the judiciary; Probate Registrar and Sheriff of Katsina State.

He became a High Court judge in 1994, a position he held until he was appointed as chief judge, Katsina State, in 2018. Abubakar is the serving chief judge of the state, and he administered the oath of office to the current Governor Alhaji Aminu Bello Masari.

A winner of the National Productivity Merit Award in 1998, a member of World Jurist Association and a fellow of the International Dispute Resolution Institute, Abubakar has also participated widely in various community development projects.

== Appointment as Chief Judge ==
On 13 March 2018, the government of Katsina state under the administration of Aminu Bello Masari announced the appointment of Musa Danladi Abubakar as the state's Acting Chief Judge. He was subsequently sworn in on the same day. He was later confirmed as substantive chief judge by the Katsina State House of Assembly on the 23 May 2018

== Personal life ==
Musa married three wives and has seventeen children; 11 sons and 6 daughters.

== Award ==
He was awarded Hon. LL.D (Islamic Jurisprudence) by the Al-Nahda International University, Niamey in November, 2018.

== See also ==
- Nigerian Body of Benchers
- List of Ahmadu Bello University alumni
