= Oladipo =

Ọládípọ̀
- Gender: Male
- Language: Yoruba

Origin
- Origin: Nigeria
- Meaning: Wealth and success becomes plenty
- Region of origin: South-west Nigeria

Oladipo (alternatively spelled "Ladipo"; variant: Oládipúpọ̀) is both a Yoruba language surname and a given name meaning "more wealth".

Notable people with the name include:

- Victor Oladipo (born 1992), American basketball player
- Divine Oladipo, British Athlete
- Oladipo Agboluaje (born 1968), British playwright
- Oladipo Diya (1944–2023), Nigerian general
- Oladipo Jadesimi, Nigerian oil businessman
- Adebukola Oladipupo, Nigerian actress
