= Lucy Surhyel Newman =

Nigerian policy consultant

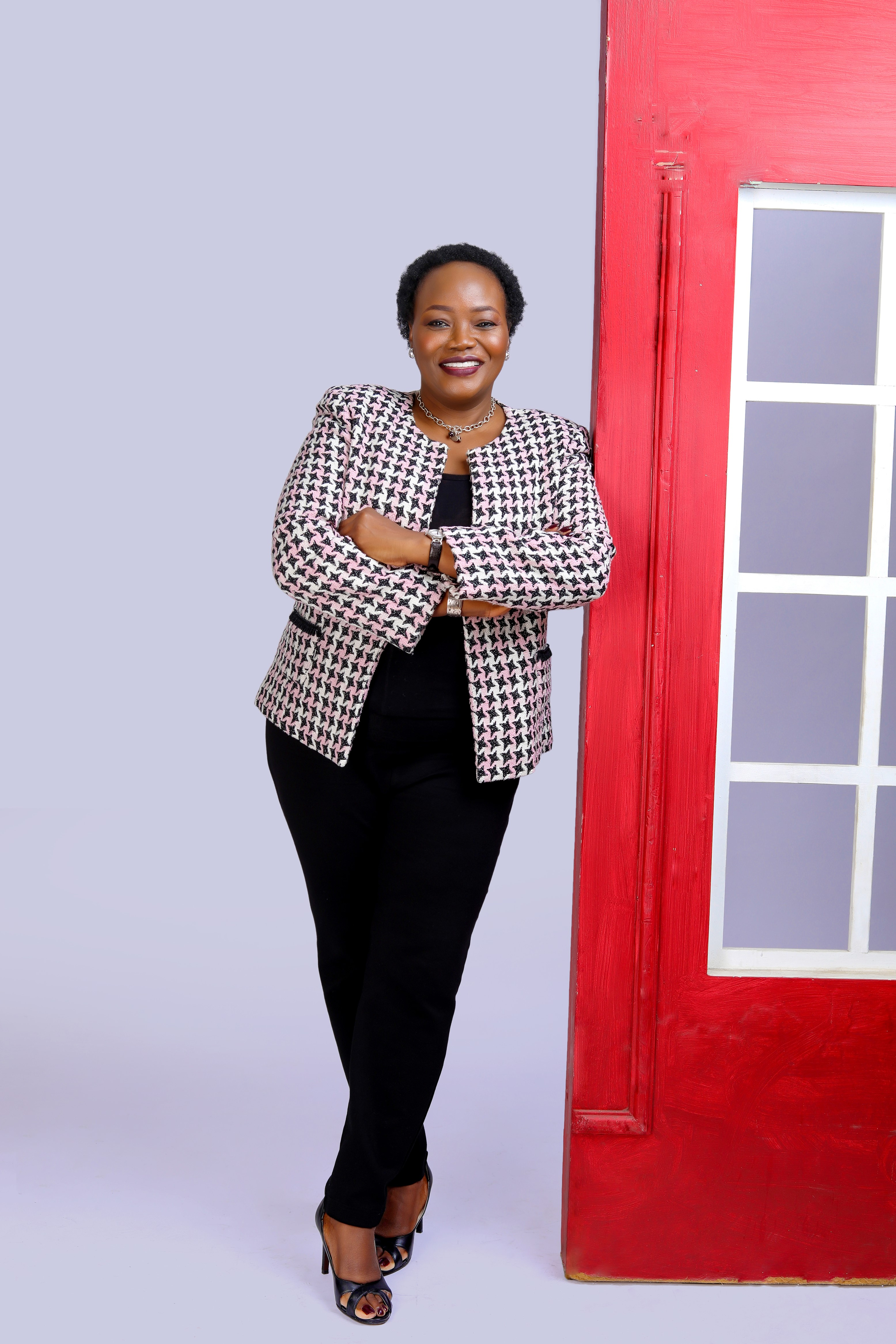
- Born: July 16, 1965 (age 61); Mubi, Adamawa State, Nigeria
- Occupations: Policy advisor, international consultant, author
- Years active: 1987–present
- Spouse: Dr. Rotimi Gabriel Olokodana
- Website: www.drlsnewman.com

Lucy Surhyel Newman (born 16 July 1965) is a Nigerian management consultant, policy adviser and author. From 2009 to 2019 she was managing director of the Financial Institutions Training Centre (FITC) in Lagos. From 2023 to 2025 she was chief executive of the Africa Private Sector Summit (APSS), a non-profit that promotes business-friendly policies in Africa, and she later became chair of its boards.

== Early life ==
Newman was born Lucy Surhyel Angaya Bwala in Mubi, in what is now Adamawa State, Nigeria. Her family comes from Marama in Hawul, Borno State, and she grew up in northern Nigeria.

== Education ==
Newman attended Federal Government College, Kaduna, and then Ahmadu Bello University, where she earned a bachelor's degree in business administration and an MBA. In 2008 she received a Doctor of Business Administration from the University of Phoenix. She later completed a corporate governance programme at INSEAD.

== Career ==
Newman began her career in 1987 at Borno Investment Company, where she worked for ten years. She then held marketing and human resources posts at several Nigerian banks, including FSB International Bank, Fidelity Bank and United Bank for Africa, before joining PricewaterhouseCoopers Nigeria as a consultant in 2006.

In May 2009 she became managing director of the Financial Institutions Training Centre, which trains staff for Nigeria's banking sector. Her term was renewed in 2013, and she left in 2019. After leaving FITC she worked as an independent consultant and board member.

In August 2023 she became chief executive of the Africa Private Sector Summit. In November 2025 she stepped down as chief executive and became chair of its advisory and executive boards.

== Board roles ==
- Chairperson, Advisory Board and Executive Board of the Africa Private Sector Summit (APSS). November 12, 2025 to Present.
- Chairman, Board Audit and Risk Committee - International Energy Services Limited (IESL) January 2025 2024 - Present.
- Independent Non Executive Director - International Energy Services Limited (IESL) March 2024 - Present.
- Member, Executive Board - Africa Private Sector Summit (APSS) August 2023 - Present. In Attendance, Advisory Board - February 2024 - November 11, 2025.
- Member, Governing Board of Borno Development Foundation (BDF) Oct 2021 - Present.
- Non-Executive Director – Renaissance Development Forum [RDF] Board, Nigeria [Non-Governmental Organization] July 2020 - 2023. Member of the Board Governance, Digitization and Sustainability Committee.
- Member, ANAP Foundation Covid – 19 Think Tank. Nigeria [Non-Governmental Organization]. March 2020 –2023.
- Member, Advisory Board of the African Center for Development Finance [ACDF] which is a Think Tank of Stellenbosch University Business School. South Africa. [Public, Educational Research] March 2019 –2022.
- Member, 16 Person Jury Panel for C K Prahalad Award for Social Innovation Global Jury Panel. November 2020 to 2022.
- Member, Central Bank of Nigeria [CBN]’s Banking Industry Sustainability Awards Jury Panel. Three Award rounds - 2016, 2017 and 2018.
- Non-Executive Director – West African Theological Seminary [WATS], Nigeria. [Private, Faith Based]. February 2021 – to November 2021.
- Non-Executive Director – International University for Information Management [IUIM], United States of America. [Private Educational] July 2020 – December 2021.
- Elected member, Governing Council of the Chartered Institute of Directors [IoD], Nigeria [Professional Network] June 2018 to June 2020
- Elected International Director, Global Board of the International Society for Performance Improvement [ISPI] representing members in 48 countries. April 2012 to April 2014.
- Ex-Officio Member, Bank Directors' Association of Nigeria [BDAN] May 2009 to September, 2019. [Professional Network]
- Managing Director, Financial Institutions Training Center [FITC] Nigeria May 2009 to September, 2019. [Professional Services Firm]
- Ex- Officio Member, West African Bankers' Association [WABA] May 2009 to September, 2019. [Professional Network]

== Honours ==
- 2024 - Modern Governance 100 [MG100] Award from Diligent, a world leading Governance, Risk and Compliance [GRC] and Software as a Service [Saas] Corporation, Houston. USA.
- 2019 – Thomas F. Gilbert Distinguished Professional Achievement Award by ISPI
- 2019 – Outstanding Women Leaders in Corporate Nigeria and Society at the Great Place to Work, Africa Awards, Lagos, Nigeria
- 2017 – MMS WHoF Award & admission into the Money Management Series Women of Fortune Hall of Fame
- 2016 – Sir Ahmadu Bello Sardauna Platinum Leadership Excellence Award as "Garkuwan Matasan Arewa" (aka shield of the northern youth)
- 2015 – Africa's Patriotic Amazon by League of African Development Students, Africa
- 2015 – Women of Merit Gold Award by People State & Resources, Nigeria
- 2014 – Outstanding Mothers' recognition, by R – Wells Media, Nigeria
- 2014 – Credit Management Honours Award, from the Institute of Credit Administrators of Nigeria
- 2014 – Outstanding Leadership Award by ISPI for achievements during term as International Director on the Global Board of ISPI from 2012/2014

== Publications ==
- Newman, L.S (2026). Leadership That Lasts: Embedding Succession Planning into Board Strategy. The Director, a Magazine of the Chartered Institute of Directors (CIoD) Nigeria. Issue No. 37; Pages 67-70.
- Newman, L. S (2025). Tête-À-Tête Avec Les Leaders Africains: Concevoir Et Hiérarchiser Les Structures. Dallas, Texas, USA: Pyxidia House.
- Newman, L.S (2022). African Leaders' Tete A Tete: Navigating Entity Design and Prioritisation for Systemic Outcomes. Dallas, Texas, USA: Pyxidia House.
- Newman, Lucy (2009). The Refractive Thinker vol. 1:an Anthology of Higher Learning. United States of America: The Refractive Thinker Press. ISBN 978-1-4666-8331-0.
- Newman, Lucy (2015). Cases on Human Performance Improvement Technologies. United States of America: Business Science Reference. ISBN 978-1-4666-8331-0.
- Newman, Lucy (April 30, 2016). "Emerging HR Landmines:Critical Concerns for CEOs" (PDF). pwc.com. PWC.
- Newman, L. S (2022). African Leaders' Tete A Tete: Navigating Entity Design And Prioritization For Systemic Outcomes. Dallas, Texas, USA: Pyxidia House.
- Newman, L.S (2022). Directors' Eyes on Africa- A Reflection on Agenda 2063's second Phase. The Director, a Magazine of the Institute of Directors Nigeria. Issue No. 29; Pages 12–16.
- Newman, L. S. (2020). Storytelling: An African Leadership Journey of Performance Improvement Innovation. In Van Time, D. M., & Burns, N. C. (Eds.), Cases on Performance Improvement Innovation (pp. 126–155). IGI Global. doi:10.4018/978-1-7998-3673-5.ch008.
- Newman, L.S (2020). Corporate Governance and Performance Imperatives for Directors in Africa: SDGs, AfCFTA and Agenda 2063. The Director, a magazine of the Institute of Directors Nigeria. Issue No. 24; Pages 64–71.
- Newman, L.S (2019). Leveraging Corporate Governance for Economic Development: Imperatives for Governments and Regulators in Sub Saharan Africa. The Director, a magazine of the Institute of Directors Nigeria. Issue No. 22, Pages: 37–48.
- Newman, L. S (2018). From Idea to Reality: The FITC Story. A case study published in People First Magazine Vol.7 No. 1(17-22). Chartered Institute of Personnel Management of Nigeria (CIPMN).
- Newman, L. S (2017). The Role of Development Finance Institutions in Development: Missed Opportunities and Imperatives for the Financial System. A paper published in the FITC Journal of Banking and Finance, Vol. 13 (1).
- Newman, L.S (2015). Branding Beyond Logo and Colors: A case study of FITC's evidence-based transformation. Being Chapter 13 of the book, J. Stefaniak (Ed.) (2015) Cases on Human Performance Improvement Technologies. Hershey, PA: IGI Publishing.
- Newman, L. S (2014). Ethical Values in the Financial Market Performance in Nigeria: recent Issues and Progress. An article published in the Financial Nigeria; Development and Finance Journal, Vol. 6 No. 71, June 2014; pp: 30–32.
- Newman, L.S (2014). Industry Sustainability and the ‘New’ Primary Mortgage Banks. An article published in the Financial Nigeria; Development and Finance Journal, Vol. 6 No. 70, May 2014; pp: 16–17.
- Newman, L. S (2013). Leveraging Corporate Governance for Economic Development: Imperatives for Regulators in Sub Saharan Africa. A paper published in Financial Nigeria; Development and Finance Journal, Vol. 6 No. 63, October 2013; pp: 16–18.
- Newman, L. S (2012). Issues and Challenges of Gender Diversity and Inclusiveness. A paper published in the Human resource Management Journal; Journal of the Chartered Institute of Personnel Management of Nigeria, Vol. 4 No: 1, 2012, 29–32.
- Newman, L. S (2011). Transformational Leadership; A Leadership approach for changing Times. A paper published in the FITC Journal of Banking and Finance, Vol. 2 No, 2011; pp 03–17.
- Newman, L.S (2011). Effects of Employee Performance Management Systems on Employee Learning and Leadership Development, 2011 – Published by LAP Publishing, Germany.
- Newman, L.S (2009). The CEO's triple dilemma of compensation, employee and corporate performance, being a one-chapter manuscript along with 9 other authors in the book, “The Refractive Thinker: an anthology of higher learning” published by the Lentz Leadership Institute of Las Vegas, Nevada USA. ISBN 978-0-9823036-1-0. Spring 2009.
- Newman, L. S (2008). Effects of Employee Performance Management Systems on Employee Learning and Development, a qualitative method dissertation in partial fulfilment of conditions precedent to a Doctorate in Business Administration (DBA) submitted to the University of Phoenix, Arizona. USA. It is a study of themes and patterns of practice to develop a new concept leading to the likely development of a new theory in performance management, and was published by ProQuest UMI. ISBN 978-1-109-04887-2. October 2008.
- Newman, L. S (August, 2007). Emerging HR Landmines: Critical Concerns for CEOs. Being an article published the Business Day Daily Newspaper of Thursday August 30, 2007.
- Newman, L.S (February, 2007). The CEOs dual dilemma: governance & sustainability in an increasingly dynamic global business environment. Being an article published on the Business Day Daily Newspaper of Monday February 19, 2007.
- Mshelia, L.S (1998). Change Integration for Corporate Survival and Growth. A competitive study for the “1998 Young Manager Competition” of the Nigerian Institute of Management. The research population was registered organizations in Nigeria, with a sample of five high performing industry leaders from five sectors of the Nigerian economy listed on the Nigerian Stock Exchange. Being a research that was selected as first position for the Lagos zone Competition and came third for the National Competition in 1998, by the NIMN.
- Mshelia, L.S (1993). The role Development Finance Institutions in Nigeria: A Case study on Borno Investment Company Limited. A mixed method thesis in partial fulfilment of conditions precedent to a Masters in Business Administration (MBA) submitted to Ahmadu Bello University, Zaria. Nigeria.
- Bwala, L.A (1987). The Nigerian Financial System. A qualitative method thesis in partial fulfilment of conditions precedent to a Bachelors of Sciences Degree (BS.C) in Business Administration submitted to Ahmadu Bello University Zaria, Nigeria.
