= Henrietta Ogan =

Henrietta Ogan is a Nigerian Business administrator and former National President of Ahmadu Bello University Alumni Association. She was succeeded by Ahmed Tijani Mora, a Pharmacist and former Registrar and Chief Executive Officer of the Pharmacists Council of Nigeria.
