= Isa Marte Hussaini =

Nigerian pharmacologist and politician

Chief of Staff to the Governor of Borno State
- Incumbent
- Assumed office August 2020
- Governor: Babagana Zulum
- Preceded by: Babagana Wakil

Commissioner for Health, Borno State
- Incumbent
- Assumed office February 2021
- Governor: Babagana Zulum
- Preceded by: Salisu Kwayabura

Commissioner for Higher Education, Borno State
- In office August 2019 – August 2020
- Governor: Babagana Zulum

Personal details
- Born: Maiduguri, Borno State, Nigeria
- Education: Ahmadu Bello University (BPharm); Chelsea College, University of London (MSc); King's College London (PhD); Averett University (MBA)
- Occupation: Pharmacologist, academic

Isa Marte Hussaini is a Nigerian professor of pharmacology and politician. He has been Chief of Staff to Babagana Zulum, Governor of Borno State, since 2020. He was Borno's Commissioner for Higher Education from 2019 and took charge of the state's Ministry of Health in 2021.

Before entering government he taught at the University of Virginia and was Dean of Pharmacy at the University of Maiduguri.

== Early life and education ==
Hussaini was born in Maiduguri. He attended Yerwa Government Secondary School in Maiduguri, where he obtained the West African School Certificate in 1975, and completed national youth service at General Hospital Kontagora, Niger State, in 1981.

He studied pharmacy at Ahmadu Bello University in Zaria, pharmacology at Chelsea College, University of London, and received a PhD in pharmacology from King's College London in 1987. He also holds an MBA from Averett University in Virginia, United States.

== Career ==
=== Academic career ===
Hussaini worked at the University of Virginia, first as a postdoctoral fellow and then, from 2001 to 2010, as a tenured associate professor of pathology and neuroscience, during which time he held four National Institutes of Health R01 grants. He was also a visiting professor at Ahmadu Bello University from 2004 to 2016.

In 2010 he moved to Nigeria as professor of pharmacology and Dean of Pharmacy at the University of Maiduguri. The faculty obtained accreditation from the Pharmacists Council of Nigeria and the National Universities Commission during his tenure. He has been editor-in-chief of the Nigerian Journal of Pharmaceutical and Biomedical Sciences.

His research concerns cancer and compounds from Nigerian medicinal plants. In May 2015 he presented a paper on the mining of Nigerian medicinal plants for cancer therapy at the induction of new fellows of the Nigerian Academy of Science in Abuja.

=== Public office ===
In August 2019, Governor Babagana Zulum appointed Hussaini Commissioner for Higher Education in Borno State. In August 2020 Zulum appointed him Chief of Staff, succeeding Babagana Wakil, who had died.

In February 2021, Zulum removed the state's Commissioner for Health, Salisu Kwayabura, and named Hussaini, still chief of staff, to head the Ministry of Health. In 2023 Zulum reappointed him Chief of Staff.

== Honours ==
Marte was elected a fellow of the African Academy of Sciences in 2017. He is also a fellow of the Nigerian Academy of Science, inducted in 2013, the Nigeria Academy of Pharmacy and the Pharmaceutical Society of Nigeria.
