= National Biotechnology Development Agency =

Nigerian federal agency

The National Biotechnology Development Agency (NABDA) is an agency established in 2001 under the Federal Ministry of Science and Technology, that implements policies, explores resources, conducts research, promotes, coordinates and develops biotechnology in Nigeria.

The NABDA also controls and supervises the introduction of genetically modified organisms into Nigeria.

== Background and history ==
- In July 2019, NABDA announced their invention of anaerobic digestion technology digesters which can convert organic wastes to biogas.
- In May 2020, NABDA worked with Nigeria Centre for Disease Control in the process of enabling local production of locally made testing kits for Coronavirus.
- In March 2022, NABDA announced it was making research on reliable and affordable drugs for Lassa fever.
- In December 2022, NABDA announced that they had locally produced a starter culture for the preparation of yoghurt with the two germs, Lactobacillus bulgaricus and Streptococcus thermophilus. In the same month, NABDA announced their livestock genetic experiments around artificial insemination for milk and meat improvement.
- In January 2023, NABDA announced plans to release insect and drought-resistant maize to Nigerian farmers to improve food production. In the same month, they worked with National Committee on Naming, Registration and Release of Crop Varieties, Livestock Breed/Fisheries to release FARO68, a rice variety and 20 other crop varieties for farmers to boost food efficiency.

== Leadership ==
Tenure	Director general
2005 - 2013	Bamidele Solomon
2013 - 2018	Lucy Jumeyi Ogbadu
2018 - 2020	Prof. Alex Casmir Uwadiegwu Akpa
2020 - present	Prof. Abdullahi Mustapha

== Controversies ==
- In June 2017, the Economic and Financial Crimes Commission (EFCC) arrested the then Director General of NABDA, Professor Lucy Jumeyi Ogbadu for alleged criminal conspiracy and diversion of N23 Million in public funds. This was part of a larger sum of N603 million naira. In an October 24, 2017 letter signed by the secretary of the EFCC, Ogbadu was absolved of any involvement in the alleged fraud. However, on January 9, 2018, it faulted the clearing and went on to file 49 charges against her. On August 30, 2021, a witness invited by the EFCC, Christopher Orji, the director of Bioresources Development Centre, Langtang, a sub-agency under NABDA, reportedly committed suicide.
- In 2017, following the issuance of the permit for the commercialization of the genetically modified cotton, a group of 16 civil society organizations sued the National Biosafety Management Agency and National Biotechnology Development Agency. The court ruled in favour of the government agencies.
- In November 2020, staff of NABDA protested citing unpaid promotion arrears, promotion examinations not being conducted, corruption and poor welfare as reasons.
- In April 2022, Nnimmo Bassey decried NABDA's distribution of commercial quantities of Genetically Modified Cowpea to farmers without informing them on what the seeds were. Farmers went on to plant, harvest and sell the seeds without knowing they were GMCs. In September 2022, NABDA and other agencies insisted that such crops were safe for consumption and to tackle food crisis.
- In November 2022, the Independent Corrupt Practices Commission arraigned Alex Akpa, a former acting director-general of NABDA, Famous Daunemigha, an ex-member of the Governing Board of NABDA and Wesley Ebi Siasia, an ex-director, finance and accounts of the agency, and others over alleged N400 million fraud. They pleaded not guilty.
