= Ifeoma Mabel Onyemelukwe =

Nigerian academic

Professor

Personal details
- Born: Ifeoma Mabel Onyemelukwe; 23 September 1950 (age 75) Awka, Anambra State, Nigeria
- Education: University of Nigeria; Ahmadu Bello University
- Profession: Professor, African Literature of French Expression

Ifeoma Mabel Onyemelukwe is a Nigerian professor of French and African literature in Ahmadu Bello University, Zaria. She writes poetry, short stories, novels, plays, literary criticism, and social criticism. She has published 27 books and 162 journals internationally and locally. In 2019, she was elected a Fellow of the Nigerian Academy of Letters (NAL).

== Early life and education ==
Onyemelukwe was born in Awka, Nigeria. She completed her Bachelor of Science degree in French at the University of Nigeria, Nsukka in 1976. She furthered her education with a Post Graduate Diploma in Education from Ahmadu Bello University, Zaria in 1982. Continuing her academic pursuits, she earned a master's and doctorate in French from Ahmadu Bello University, Zaria in 1979 and 1987 respectively.

== Career ==
She began her career as a graduate assistant at the Ahmadu Bello University (ABU) Advance Teachers' College in 1978. After that, she worked at the ABU, Zaria Institute of Education between 1992 and 2001. In 2002, she joined the Department of French within the Faculty of Arts at ABU, Zaria. She remained there until her mandatory retirement in 2020.

In her career, she served in several leadership roles, such as a professor on sabbatical in the Department of French at Kaduna State University, Kaduna. Additionally, she held the position of Visiting Professor at the French Department of the Federal College of Education, Zaria.

Onyemelukwe is a Fellow of the Chartered Institute of Management Consultants and the Chartered Institute of Administration. She has also been listed in Contemporary Who's Who (2002-date) and International Who's Who of Professional and Business Women (2002-date). On October 14, 2015, she delivered an inaugural lecture, with attendees including Dr. Alex Ekwueme and several others dignitaries.

== Personal life ==
She is married to Geoffrey Chukwubuike Onyemelukwe, a Consultant Physician and Professor of Medicine and Immunology at Ahmadu Bello University, Zaria. Together, they are blessed with five (5) children.

== Selected works ==
- Ifeoma Onyemelukwe(2023). History of French-Speaking Nigerian Literature. Our Knowledge Publishing.
- Ifeoma Onyemelukwe(2016). Beyond The Boiling Point. Labelle Educational Publishers.
- Onyemelukwe, I. M. (2018). Analysis of Alain Mabanckou’s Bleu-blanc-rouge as a Flipside Work. IMPACT: International Journal of Research in Humanities, Arts, and Literature (IMPACT: IJRHAL), 6, 443-454.
- Onyemelukwe, I. M. (2021). Ableism activism theory: Emerging perspective in literary criticism. Journal of Modern European Languages and Literatures, 15, 1-15.
- Onyemelukwe, I. M. (2019). Language Endangerment: The Case of the Igbo Language. Journal of Modern European Languages And Literatures, 11, 18-30.
- Onyemelukwe, I. M. (2015). Heroism and Antiheroism in Literature in French: Can You See. An Inaugural Lecture Series No. 06/15. Zaria: Ahmadu Bello University, Zaria, Nigeria.
- Onyemelukwe, I. M., Muotoo, C. H., & Odudigbo, M. E. (2020). La Thanatologie dans L’ombre D’imana: Voyages Jusqu’au Bout du Rwanda de Veronique Tadjo. UJAH: Unizik Journal of Arts and Humanities, 21(1), 71-101.
- Onyemelukwe, I. M., Adamu, A. D., & Muotoo, C. H. (2021). Le Griot Dans La Litterature Postcoloniale: Une Etude De Guelwaar De Sembene Ousmane. UJAH: Unizik Journal of Arts and Humanities, 22(1), 55-77.
- Onyemelukwe, I. M. (2019). Plagiarism or academic theft: typology, indicators and the way out. International Journal of Applied and Natural Sciences, 8(2), 9-26.
- Onyemelukwe, I. M. (2019). Le Phallocentrisme vis-a-vis du Pouvoir Feminin dans les Proverbes Awka. UJAH: Unizik Journal of Arts and Humanities, 20(1), 182-212.
