= Elizabeth Ofili =

Nigerian-American physician

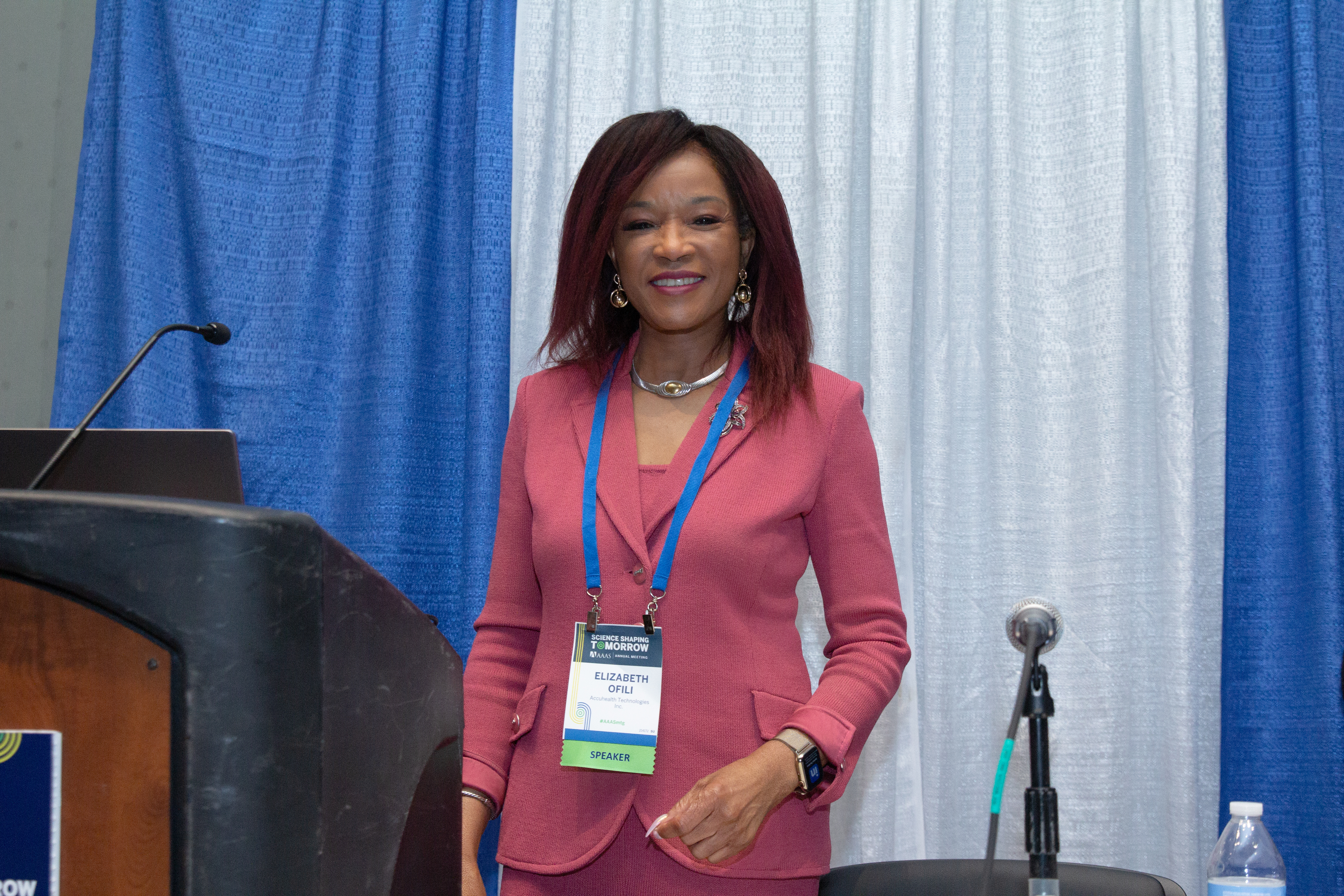
- Born: August 3, 1956 (age 70); Nigeria
- Education: Ahmadu Bello University; Johns Hopkins University
- Occupation: Cardiologist
- Employer(s): Washington University in St. Louis; Morehouse School of Medicine

Elizabeth Odilile Ofili (born 1956) is a Nigerian-American physician and cardiology researcher. She was the first woman to become president of the Association of Black Cardiologists.

== Early life and education ==
Ofili was born and raised in Nigeria, and attended Ahmadu Bello University for medical school. She moved to the United States in 1982 and earned a master's of public health from Johns Hopkins University in 1983. She completed her postgraduate education in Tulsa, Oklahoma.

== Career and research ==
Ofili began her career with research at Oral Roberts University in Tulsa, and continued her cardiology research while a professor at Washington University School of Medicine. In 1994, she became an associate professor at Morehouse School of Medicine, and was promoted to full professor in 1999. Her research focuses on heart disease in the African-American population, dyslipidemia, hypertension, coronary artery disease, heart failure, and echocardiography; her work in the African American Heart Failure Trial substantially changed guidelines on heart failure treatment for African-Americans. She has also conducted research with NASA into the effects of microgravity on vasculature. She is acclaimed for her studies of myocardial blood flow. Ofili is the CEO and founder of AccuHealth Technologies Inc./Health 360xTM, a platform focused on diversity in clincial trials, and health management.

== Honors and awards ==
- Young Investigator Research Award, American Society of Echocardiography and Mallinckrodt Cardiology (1993)
- Top 25 Black Female Doctors, Heart and Soul (1997)
- Center of Clinical Research Excellence Award, National Institutes of Health (1999)
- President, Association of Black Cardiologists (2000-2002)
- Nannette K. Wenger Award for Health Policy, National Institutes of Health (2001)
- Council of Dean Fellow, Association of American Medical Colleges (2007)
- Elected Member, Association of University Cardiologists (2013)
- Board of Trustees, Educational Commission for Foreign Medical Graduates
- Board of Trustees, Pfizer Women's Health Initiative
- Daniel Savage Memorial Science Award, Association of Black Cardiologists
- Board of Directors, National Space Biomedical Research Institute
- Advisory Board, National Clinical Center
