= Hadiza Galadanci =

Nigerian professor of gynaecology and obstetrics, Bayero University Kano

Professor Hadiza Galadanci
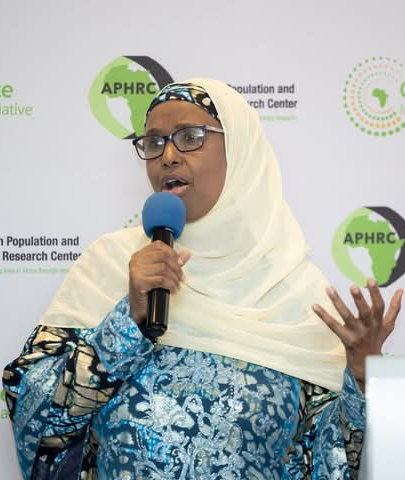
- Born: Hadiza Shehu Galadanci; Kano, Nigeria
- Education: Ahmadu Bello University
- Occupations: Gynaecologist, obstetrician, educator, researcher
- Known for: Advocacy for maternal health and child health
- Notable work: Research on postpartum hemorrhage; E-MOTIVE study

Hadiza Galadanci FRCOG FWACS is a Nigerian obstetrician and medical academic. The first female obstetrician and professor trained in Kano State, Galadanci is professor of obstetrics and gynaecology at Bayero University, Kano. She is known for her pioneering contributions to improved obstetric outcomes. An advocate for maternal health in Nigeria and globally, Galadanci is the director of the Africa Center of Excellence for Population Health and Policy, a World Bank-supported initiative aimed at advancing healthcare research and policy in Africa.

== Education and background ==
Hadiza Galadanci earned her medical degree (MBBS) in 1987 from Ahmadu Bello University, Zaria. She became a fellow of the West African College of Surgeons (FWACS) in 1998 and a member of the Royal College of Obstetricians and Gynaecologists (MRCOG) in 2002. In 2014, she achieved fellowship status (FRCOG) with the same institution. Galadanci also earned an MSc in Reproductive and Sexual Health Research from University College London and a diploma from the London School of Hygiene and Tropical Medicine. She also completed a project management diploma at the Galilee International Management Institute in 2018.

== Career and contributions ==
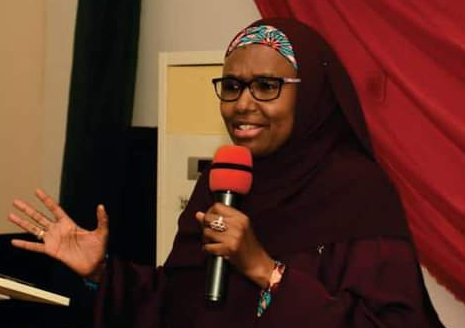

Galadanci has dedicated her career to improving maternal and child health in Nigeria and globally. She has published over 100 peer-reviewed articles in prominent journals and has trained and mentored over 2,000 students in her field. Her contributions include leading research on postpartum hemorrhage and participating in the E-MOTIVE study to reduce maternal mortality.

She is also involved in global health initiatives such as AlignMNH, supported by the Bill & Melinda Gates Foundation and USAID. Her work has been recognized through awards, including the Heroine of Health Award in 2023 and her inclusion in TIME magazine's 100 Most Influential People in Health in 2024.

== Awards and recognition ==
- FIGO Women Award (2018)
- Heroine of Health Award (2023)
- TIME Magazine's 100 Most Influential People in Health (2024)

== See also ==
- Maternal health
- Women's health
- Public health
- World Health Organization
