= Jimmy Adegoke =

Climate scientist

James O. Adegoke
- Citizenship: United States
- Education: Ahmadu Bello University; University of Ibadan; Pennsylvania State University
- Known for: Climate Change
- Scientific career
- Fields: Geosciences; Climatology
- Workplaces: Joint Institute for the Study of the Atmosphere and Ocean, University of Missouri-Kansas City; Federal University of Technology Minna; Colorado State University; Center for Earth Resources Observation and Science; Council for Scientific and Industrial Research; South Africa Department of Science and Technology

James O. Adegoke is a Nigerian-American climate scientist and Emeritus Professor at the University of Missouri-Kansas City (UMKC) where he served as Chair of the Department of Geosciences (2008-2010). He also served as an appointee of the Mayor of Kansas City Missouri on the city's Environmental Management Commission (EMC) and has testified before the South Africa Parliament's Portfolio Committee on Science and Technology and the Climate Change Committee of the Nigerian House of Representatives. In the United States, he has testified at the United States House of Representatives for the United States House Select Committee on Energy Independence and Global Warming.

He serves on the Technical Advisory Board of several United Nations (UN) applied science programs, including the United Nations Educational Scientific and Cultural Organization (UNESCO) project on the application of remote sensing for water resources and ecosystem management in Africa. At the invitation of the Nigerian Government, he served as Chair of the Ministerial Advisory Committee on Agricultural Resilience in Nigeria (ACARN) which developed the National Agricultural Resilience Framework (NARF) for Nigeria in 2014. Prof. Adegoke is a distinguished member of the Advisory Board of NatureNews, Africa's foremost independent newspaper that is focused on Environment, Climate Change and Sustainable Earth.

More recently, Professor Adegoke served as Senior Consultant at the African Development Bank Group (AfDB) Department of Climate Change and Green Growth while on leave from UMKC. He continues to work full-time with the AfDB following his recent retirement from UMKC. He maintains affiliation with UMKC as an appointed Emeritus Professor and member of the UMKC Emeritus College.

== Background ==
Adegoke majored in Geography, with minors in Physics and Geology, as an undergraduate at Ahmadu Bello University. He attended the University of Ibadan, earning an M.S. in Geography, specializing in Climatology, and a Ph.D. at Pennsylvania State University USA, focusing on satellite climatology. He completed postdoctoral work at the Cooperative Institute for Research in the Atmosphere (CIRA) at Colorado State University, USA. He was also, in the early 1990s, a visiting research scholar at the Joint Institute for the Study of the Atmosphere and Ocean (JISAO) at the University of Washington, in Seattle.

Professor Adegoke specializes in the sub-specialty field of "land surface-atmosphere interactions" where he has made important scientific contributions over the last two decades. His current work focuses on societal impacts of environmental change, including air pollution studies in rapidly changing mid-latitude urban areas, climate impacts on water resources in the Lake Chad Basin, and coastal ecosystem dynamics in the Niger Delta region of Nigeria. He is a member of several professional societies including the American Geophysical Union (AGU), Association of American Geographers (AAG), and American Meteorological Society (AMS). He is on the Advisory Council or Boards of multiple programs or centers funded by major funding institutions such as the World Bank and the UK Research and Innovation.

He has held research and teaching appointments at the Federal University of Technology Minna in Nigeria, Colorado State University in Fort Collins, Colorado and the Earth Resources Observation Systems (EROS) Data Center, in Sioux Falls, South Dakota. From 2010 to 2012 he served as the executive director of the Council for Scientific and Industrial Research (CSIR) Natural Resources & Environment (NRE) Division, in Pretoria, South Africa where he had concurrent appointment as Director of the Applied Center for Climate & Earth Systems Science (ACCESS), a Center of Excellence (CoE) of the South Africa Department of Science and Technology (DST) Global Change Grande Challenge (GCGC) program. In 2017, he completed a consultancy stint in 2017 (April to December) as Interim Executive Director of the West African Science Service Center on Climate Change and Adapted Land Use (WASCAL). Before that, he served for two years on WASCAL's Governing Board and as chair of the organization's Scientific Advisory Committee. More recently, he served as Senior Consultant at the African Development Bank Group (AfDB) Department of Climate Change and Green Growth while on leave from the University of Missouri-Kansas City.
