= Clara Bata Ogunbiyi =

Hon. Clara Bata Ogunbiyi (CFR) [RTD JSC]

Justice of the Supreme Court of Nigeria
- In office July 2012 – 27 February 2018

Personal details
- Born: 27 February 1948 (age 78) Borno State, Nigeria
- Party: Non partisian

Clara Bata Ogunbiyi CFR (born 27 February 1948) is a Nigerian jurist and former Justice of the Supreme Court of Nigeria.

== Early life ==
Justice Clara was born on February 27, 1948, at Lassa, a town in Borno State, Northeastern Nigeria. She obtained a diploma certificate in Law from Ahmadu Bello University in June 1971 before she later enrolled for a bachelor's degree in Law from the same university in June 1975 and was Call to the bar, the Nigerian bar in 1976, the same year she graduated from the Nigerian Law School. She completed the compulsory one year Youth Service in June 1977. She proceeded to the University of Hull where she received a master's degree in Criminology in 1983 and a Post Graduate Diploma certificate in Education from the University of Maiduguri.

== Law career ==
She began her Law career in October 1971 as Assistant Registrar at the High Court of Justice Maiduguri where she rose to the position of state Counsel in 1977 and August 1979, she became a Senior State Counsel, a position she held until her appointment as Deputy Director of Public Prosecution. In December 1984, she became the Director of Civil Litigation, a position she held until she was appointed as Judge of the High Court of Borno State. In October 2002, she was appointed to the bench of the Nigerian courts of appeal as Justice and on 2012, she was appointed to the bench of the Supreme Court of Nigeria as justice, along with Justice Musa Datijo Muhammad.

Her career in the legal profession spans several years as she rose through the ranks to become the Deputy Director of Public Prosecution, and Director of Civil Litigation in the Borno State Ministry of Justice, before her appointment to the bench as a Judge of the Borno State High Court of Justice, the first woman to have accomplished that feat in the North Eastern part of Nigeria.

Coming from a region where females were educationally disadvantaged she became an eminent jurist eventually elevated to the Court of final jurisdiction in Nigeria.

Hon. Justice Clara B. Ogunbiyi, is also Chair Person of the Board of Trustees Peniel Outreach Ministry; a member Board of Trustees, Chapel of Grace, University of Maiduguri and actively running a family foundation known as, Ezekiel and Clara Foundation which promotes the cause of widows, orphans the less privileged in the Church and the society in general.

A devout Christian who leaves no one in doubt of her commitment to her faith, Hon. Justice Ogunbiyi, has attended numerous conferences, seminars and workshops, and presented papers at both national and international fora. She is also a recipient of several professional and general awards.

== Membership ==
- Member, Nigerian Bar Association
- Member, International Bar Association
- Member, Nigerian Body of Benchers

== Personal life ==
She is married to Dr (Chief) Bamigboye Ezekiel Ogunbiyi.
