= Kabura Zakama =

Nigerian poet (born 1964)

- Kabura Zakama
- Born: 11 May 1964 (age 62); Garkida, Adamawa, Nigeria
- Education: University of Sussex; Ahmadu Bello University
- Occupation: Author/poet
- Organization: Foreign, Commonwealth and Development Office

Kabura Zakama (born 11 May 1964) is a Nigerian poet, veterinarian and an international development and humanitarian practitioner. His collection of poems, The Man Lived won the 1999 Association of Nigerian Authors ANA Poetry Prize. He has identified Birago Diop, Lenrie Peters, Tanure Ojaide and Kwesi Brew as the key influences on his poetry. In 1998, Zakama established Kairos Productions in order to publish upcoming writers. His poetry is well received across Africa and beyond.

== Early life and education ==
Kabura Lynn Zakama was born into the Garnvwa Family of Garkida, Adamawa State, North East Nigeria on 11 May 1964, and had his primary education at North Garkida Primary School. He had his secondary education at Federal Government College, Maiduguri in Borno State, Nigeria, where he received a Federal Government School Scholarship. He attended Ahmadu Bello University in Zaria where he obtained a Doctor of Veterinary Medicine degree in 1989. That year, he also received a Proficiency Certificate in French.

In 1997, Kabura Zakama completed a Postgraduate Diploma in Management at Bayero University, Kano. He was awarded the Chevening Scholarship in 2004 and completed a Master's degree in Governance and Development at the Institute of Development Studies, University of Sussex in Brighton, United Kingdom in 2005.

== Career ==
Kabura Zakama was in private veterinary practice for nine years before starting a career in international development. In 1999, he founded Pastoralist Development Initiative, a capacity building and human development NGO with nomadic pastoralists in North Central Nigeria, which focused on governance, health, education and livelihoods programmes.

In 2003, he joined ActionAid Nigeria as a Programme Advisor for Capacity Building. He later left and helped to set up the Christian Aid programme in Nigeria in 2005, becoming Acting Country Manager in 2009. He joined the Democratic Governance for Development Programme of United Nations Development Program UNDP Nigeria in 2010 as a Civil Society Expert until 2015 when he started his current role as Regional Coordinator for North East Nigeria with the Foreign, Commonwealth and Development Office. Kabura Zakama retired from paid employment in March 2026 and set up Kairos Impact Group Limited (www.kairosimpact.group), through which he manages Kamji Consulting Limited and Kairos Tablets and Scrolls Limited (www.tabletsandscrolls.com).

As a precocious but introverted child, Kabura Zakama started writing poetry at a tender age. While he was at Veterinary School, he wrote poetry and pasted them on notice boards. He contributed a poem, Farida, which was dedicated to a classmate that was killed by a stray bullet when the Police were called to quell a student riot, to the student magazine.

It was in 1994 that Kabura Zakama met Prof Zaynab Alkali who invited him to a defining poetry/short story workshop which birthed Vultures in the Air: Voices from Northern Nigeria. From that time, Kabura Zakama, who was a closet poet, began to publish his poems in newspapers, magazines and anthologies.

In 1999, the unpublished collection of poem, The Man Lived, won the ANA Poetry Prize. The collection was eventually published in 2004, the year during which Zakama was a participant on the British Council's Crossing Borders programme that paired young Nigerian poets with established British poets for mentoring. Zakama worked with the bilingual Welsh poet laureate, Menna Elfyn. He was reselected for the second year to work on writing in indigenous languages with the poet laureate.

Kabura Zakama now sees his poetry as a calling and he promotes young writers as well as writing in his mother tongue which is gradually disappearing. He is an active member of the Association of Nigerian Authors, Abuja Literary Society and Abuja Writers Forum where he engages in performance poetry and dabbles into short story and non-fiction writing. As an active blogger, he is also active on several online literary forums.

== Poetry ==
Kabura Zakama started writing poetry in his early teens and has contributed to national and international poetry anthologies. In 1999, he won the Association of Nigerian Authors ANA Poetry Prize for his collection of poems, The Man Lived. Many of his poems address social and governance issues in Nigeria. His collection of poems, Chant of the Angry, was shortlisted for the ANA Poetry Prize in 2022.

== Works ==
Sole publications

- The Man Lived (poems), Kairos Productions, 2004
- Chant of the Angry (poems), Kairos Productions, 2021

Anthologies

- Vultures in the Air: Voices from Northern Nigeria, edited by Zaynab Alkali and Al Imfeld, Spectrum Books, 1995
- 25 New Nigerian Poets, edited by Toyin Adewale; Ishmael Reed Publishing, 2000
- Passport to the New World, edited by Sunny Ayewanu; Apex Books Limited, 2001
- Uncle Bola's Promise: an Abuja Literary Society anthology of poems and prose, compiled by Victor Anoliefo; Foucault Publishers, Netherlands, 2003
- Five Hundred Nigeria Poets, Volume One, edited by Jerry Agada; Aboki Publishers, 2005
- Dance the Guns to Silence: 100 Poems for Ken Saro-Wiwa, edited by Nii Ayikwei Parkes and Kadija Sesay; flipped eye publishing and African Writers Abroad, 2005
