= Tonya Lawani =

Nigerian entrepreneur, author and brand specialist

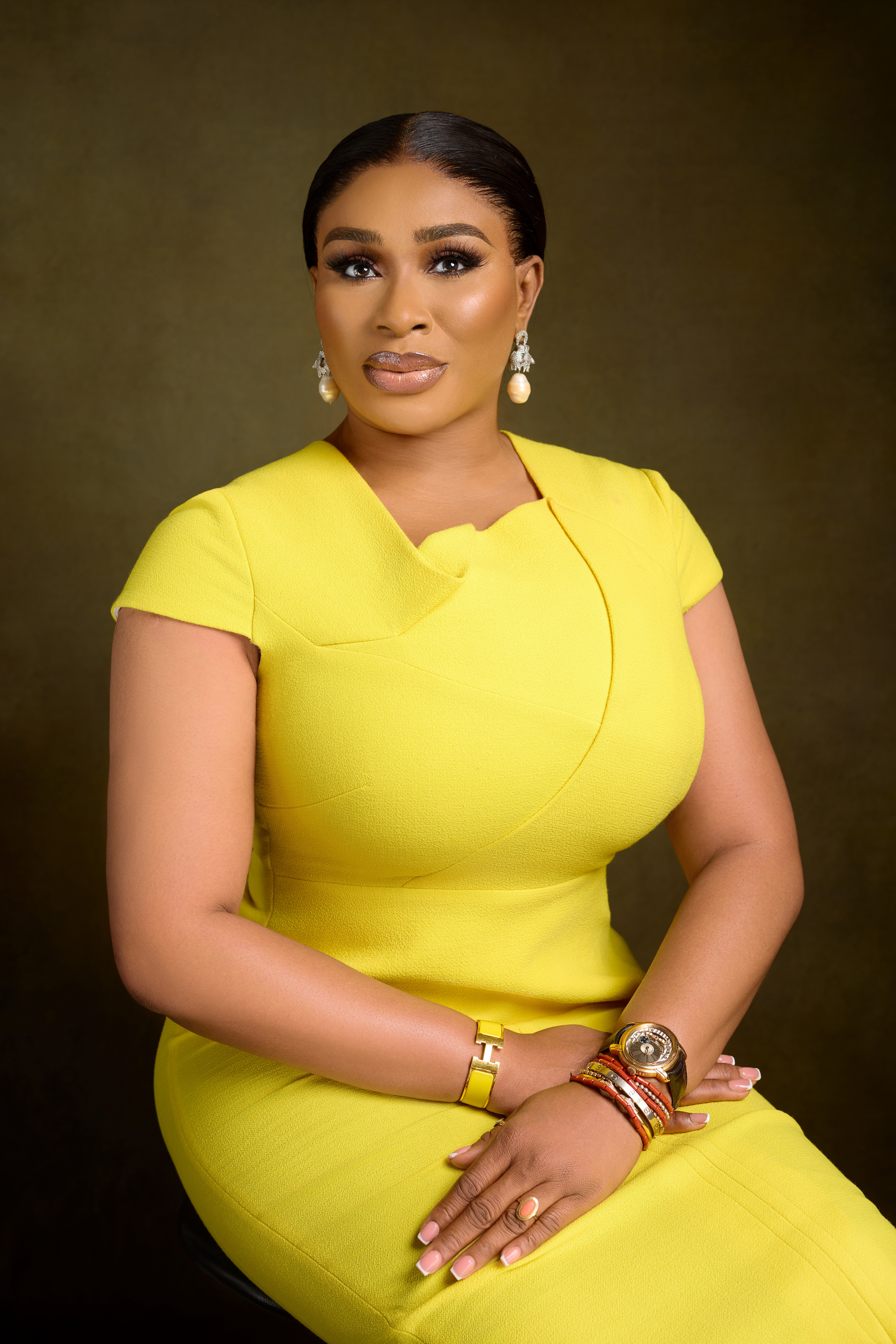
- Born: Tonya Osato Lawani
- Education: Ahmadu Bello University; Metropolitan School of Business & Management UK
- Occupations: entrepreneur; economist; brand specialist; author
- Years active: 2005–present
- Title: GCEO of SEAL Group

Tonya Osato Lawani is a Nigerian business magnate, trained economist, author and brand specialist. She is the founder and group chief executive of SEAL Group, and a Member of the Chartered Institute of Directors (M.CIoD).

== Early life and education ==
Tonya Lawani, originally from Edo State, was born in Kaduna State in the northern part of Nigeria to the family of nine. She is the last born of seven children. Lawani had her secondary education at the Federal Government Girls’ College, Bwari, Abuja. She holds an MBA from Metropolitan School of Business & Management UK, a Bachelor of Science degree from Ahmadu Bello University, Zaria, Kaduna State, where she studied Economics. She is fluent in French, English and Hausa languages. She is an alumna of Lagos Business School, and has completed executive programmes at Harvard University.

== Career ==
Tonya Lawani is chief executive officer, SEAL Group, a multi-sectoral conglomerate with business interests in manufacturing, advertising, hospitality, real estate, print media and other sectors. She started her entrepreneurial journey while she was an undergraduate at the Ahmadu Bello University. Upon graduation, she established a merchandising and retail outfit, called the Virgin Vie Angel Limited in 2005. A year later, she founded ABC Inflatables Nigeria Limited – an advertising company. In 2010, Virgin Hospitality Company was established by Lawani. She later founded the Quick Print Shop Limited "to complete the value chain of all activities in the SEAL Group." Tonya Lawani sits on the boards of several companies, including NASCON Allied Industries Plc, (a subsidiary of Dangote Group), Corona Schools’ Trust Council, Tatum Bank, amongst others. She was appointed Advisory Committee member of the National Institute of Sports in August 2025.

== Book ==
- iSucceed: Business Planner

== Social advocacy ==
In 2019, Tonya Lawani launched the Lagos Enterprise Summit, The same year, she convened the HSE Summit in response to the Itafaji building collapse, bringing together stakeholders to address health, safety, and environmental concerns. Tonya Lawani is the founder of Girl Child Empowerment Initiative, "an entrepreneurial skill development initiative... designed to empower adolescent girls..."

== Recognitions ==
In 2025, Tech Economy featured Lawani as one of the 100 women "shaping the future" in its Special International Women's Day 2025 Edition. Lawani graced the cover page of the January/February 2019 issue of Today's Woman (TW) Magazine, Nigeria's leading women's lifestyle magazine. Lawani is a lifetime member of the Lagos Business School – Pan-Atlantic University. She delivered her first international paper on youth leadership at the Massachusetts Institute of Technology (MIT).
