= Fateema Mohammed =

Nigerian politician

Honorable Fateema Mohammed

Personal details
- Born: Borno State
- Party: Peoples Democratic Party
- Education: Command Children School; Command Secondary School, Ipaja
- Alma mater: Ahmadu Bello University
- Occupation: Politician
- Website: fateemamohammed.org

Honourable Fateema Mohammed is a Nigerian politician and member of the Ifako-Ijaiye constituency in Lagos State, Nigeria and a Convener/Founder of Fateema Mohammed Foundation.

== Early life and education ==
Fateema Mohammed was born to the family of Mr and Mrs Audu. Mohammed in Borno State. She attended Command Children School, Bonny Camp Lagos, Command Secondary School, Ipaja before proceeding to Ahmadu Bello University, Zaria. She is a graduate of Microbiology from Ahmadu Bello University, Zaria.

== Political career ==
Fatima Mohammed started her political foray in 1999 with Alliance for Democracy (AD) where she served actively in various assignments including as PRS in the then Bola Ahmed Tinubu Campaign Organization (BATCO). She was the arrowhead of Jimi Agbaje gubernatorial campaign in 2007.

She was a member of Jimi Agbaje Campaign Team, Lagos State (PDP Gubernatorial Candidate 2007). She was the coordinator of Aeroland Campaign Team (Senate in 2015). Director General, Atikunation – Atiku Support group for 2019 presidential election, 2017 till Date. Mohammed has openly declared support to Atiku Abubakar to be the winner of the upcoming 2019 general election in Nigeria.
