= Salisu Abubakar Maikasuwa =

Nigerian politician (born 1958)

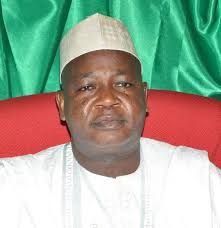

Clerk of National Assembly

Personal details
- Born: March 4, 1958 (age 68) Keffi, Nasarawa State, Nigeria
- Children: 3

Salisu Abubakar Maikasuwa is a Nigerian clerk who has served as the Clerk of the National Assembly of Nigeria.

== Early life ==
Salisu Abubakar Maikasuwa was born on 4 March 1958 to Abubakar and Fatima Maikasuwa of the Keffi royalty.

== Education ==
He attended Abdu Zanga Primary School, Keffi from where he got his first school leaving certificate (FSLC) in 1970. He acquired his West African School Certificate in 1975, having entered into the government secondary school Kuru in the current Plateau State in 1971.

He enrolled for the School of Basic Studies, Zaria, earned the school's basic studies certificate and promptly gained admission into the Ahmadu Bello University Zaria, acquiring his first degree in the social sciences in 1980. He received a master's degree in Public Administration and policy analysis, University of Jos in 1983.
