= Innocent Ujah =

Nigerian Professor of Obstetrics and Gynaecology

Professor Innocent Ujah mni, mon

Director General of Nigerian Institute of Medical Research
- In office 24 May 2010 – 27 July 2016
- Appointed by: Goodluck Jonathan
- Appointed by: Muhammadu Buhari
- Preceded by: position established

President of Nigerian Medical Association
- Assuming office 30 May
- Succeeding: Francis Faduyile

Personal details
- Born: Innocent Achanya Otobo Ujah; 6 November 1954 (age 71)
- Education: Ahmadu Bello University
- Occupation: Professor of Obstetrics and Gynaecology

Innocent Achanya Otobo Ujah (born 6 November 1954) is a Nigerian Professor of Obstetrics and Gynaecology, the former Vice-Chancellor of the Federal University of Health Sciences, Otukpo, Benue State and a past president of the Nigerian Medical Association (NMA).

== Biography ==
Ujah was born on 6 November 1954 and is from Aidogodo-Okpoga, Okpokwu, Benue State. He studied medicine at Ahmadu Bello University (ABU), Zaria and graduated in June 1978. He started working as a lecturer and consultant at University of Jos and Jos University Teaching Hospital in 1988. He became a professor in 2001. He is married and has four children.

Ujah was appointed as the director general of the Nigerian Institute of Medical Research (NIMR) by Dr. Goodluck Jonathan in April 2010 and was disengaged on 27 July 2016 for corruption charges. He was appointed as the pioneer Vice-Chancellor of the Federal University of Health Sciences, Otukpo by Muhammadu Buhari on 12 May 2020. He was elected as the President of the Nigerian Medical Association (NMA) in a virtual election on 30 May 2020, succeeding Francis Faduyile. Concerns were raised surrounding Ujah's emergence as the NMA president as he is a government appointee and his conflict of interest might weaken the position of the NMA.

He was investigated for some irregularities during his leadership at NIMR.

He is a member of Society of Gynaecology and Obstetrics of Nigeria (SOGON).
