= Cooperative Institute for Climate, Ocean, and Ecosystem Studies =

US research institute

Coordinates: 47.653030°N 122.314653°W

The Cooperative Institute for Climate, Ocean, and Ecosystem Studies (CICOES; formerly known as the Joint Institute for the Study of the Atmosphere and Ocean; JISAO) is a cooperative institute jointly operated by the National Oceanic and Atmospheric Administration (NOAA) Office of Oceanic and Atmospheric Research (OAR) and the University of Washington (UW). It was established in 1977 for the purpose of fostering research collaboration between institutions. Dr. John K. Horne is the current director. It is one of 16 NOAA Cooperative Institutes (CIs).

The CICOES research themes are:

- Climate and Ocean Variability, Change and Impacts
- Earth Systems and Processes
- Environmental Chemistry and Ocean Carbon
- Marine Ecosystems: Observation, Analysis, and Forecasts
- Ocean and Coastal Observations
- Environmental Data Science
- Aquaculture Science
- Human Dimensions in Marine Systems
- Polar Studies
