= Tijjani Muhammad-Bande =

President of the 74th UN General Assembly

Professor Tijjani Muhammad-Bande GCON OFR
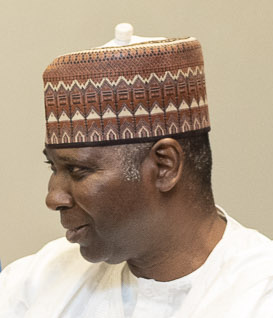
- Muhammad-Bande in 2019

President of the 74th UN General Assembly
- In office 17 September 2019 – 15 September 2020
- Preceded by: María Fernanda Espinosa
- Succeeded by: Volkan Bozkir

Vice President of the 71st UN General Assembly
- In office September 2016 – September 2017
- President: Peter Thomson

Permanent Representative of Nigeria to the United Nations
- In office 3 May 2017 – 12 February 2024
- President: Muhammadu Buhari; Bola Tinubu
- Preceded by: Joy Ogwu

Director General of the National Institute for Policy and Strategic Studies
- In office April 2010 – February 2016

Vice Chancellor of the Usman Danfodio University
- In office 2004–2009

Personal details
- Born: Tijjani Muhammad-Bande; 7 December 1957 (age 68) Zagga, Northern Region, British Nigeria (now in Kebbi State, Nigeria)
- Children: 4
- Education: Ahmadu Bello University (B.Sc.); Boston University (M.A); University of Toronto (Ph.D.)
- Occupation: Political scientists; diplomat; academic

Tijjani Muhammad-Bande GCON OFR (born 7 December 1957) is a Nigerian diplomat, academic and political scientist who was the president of the United Nations General Assembly 74th session from 17 September 2019 to 15 September 2020. He previously served as vice president of the 71st session from September 2016 to September 2017. He served as Nigeria's Permanent Representative to the United Nations from 2017 to 2024.

From 2010 to 2016, he was the director general of the National Institute of Policy and Strategic Studies in Kuru, Nigeria, and was the vice chancellor of the Usmanu Danfodiyo University from 2004 to 2009.

== Early life ==
Muhammad-Bande was born and educated in Zagga, a town in present-day Kebbi State.

== Education ==
He attended Ahmadu Bello University in Zaria where he received a bachelor's degree in political science in 1979 before proceeding to Boston University, where he graduated with a Master of Arts in political science in 1981. Muhammad-Bande received a Ph.D. in political science from the University of Toronto in 1987.

== Career ==
In the 1980s, he taught at the Usman Danfodio University in Sokoto and rose to the rank of professor in 1998. Between 2000 and 2004, Bande served as the director-general of the African Training and Research Centre in Administration for Development in Tangier, Morocco. Between 2004 and 2009, he served as vice chancellor of Usman Danfodio University before being appointed director-general of Nigeria's National Institute for Policy and Strategic Studies, a position he held from 2010 to 2016.

== Personal life ==
He is married with four children.

== See also ==
- List of Ahmadu Bello University alumni

Political offices
Preceded by María Fernanda Espinosa	President of the United Nations General Assembly; 2019–2020	Succeeded by Volkan Bozkır
