= Musa Dattijo Muhammad =

Nigerian Jurist (born 1953)

Musa Dattijo Muhammad CFR OFR

Justice of the Supreme Court of Nigeria
- In office July 2012 – 27 October 2023

Personal details
- Born: 27 October 1953 (age 72) Chanchaga, Northern Region, British Nigeria (now Chanchaga, Niger State, Nigeria)
- Party: Non partisian

Musa Dattijo Muhammad CFR OFR (born 27 October 1953) is a Nigerian jurist and former Justice of the Supreme Court of Nigeria.

== Early life ==
Musa Dattijo was born on 27 October 1953 at Chanchaga, a local government area in Minna, the capital of Niger State, North-Central Nigeria. He attended Authority Primary School, Minna and Sardauna memorial secondary school where he obtained the West Africa School Certificate in 1971. He attended Bayero University in Kano State Northern Nigeria for a pre-degree Certificate before he proceeded to Ahmadu Bello University where he received a Bachelor of Law degree in 1976. He later received a master's degree in law from University of Warwick in 1983.

== Law career ==
In July 2012, he was appointed to the bench of the Supreme Court of Nigeria as Justice. He presided over the ruling of the Supreme Court that affirmed Gbenga Kaka as the senator-elect of Ogun East Senatorial District in the 2 April 2011 senatorial election.

== Awards ==
In October 2022, a Nigerian national honour of Commander of the Order of the Federal Republic (CFR) was conferred on him by President Muhammadu Buhari.

== Membership ==
- Member, Nigerian Bar Association
- Member, International Bar Association
- Member, Nigerian Body of Benchers
