= Saidat Adegoke =

Nigerian footballer

Personal information
- Date of birth: 24 September 1985 (age 41)
- Place of birth: Ilorin, Kwara

Team information
- Current team: Lugano

Senior career*
Years	Team	Apps	(Gls)
- Remo Queens
2007–2008	ACF Trento		
2008–2011	ACF Milan		
2011–2012	FCF Como 2000		

International career
2010	Nigeria		
- * Club domestic league appearances and goals

Saidat Adegoke was born in Ilorin, a southwestern part of Nigeria on September 24th 1985 is a Nigerian footballer.

== Career ==
Adegoke is a footballer, Nigerian footballer. In the summer of 2007, she began playing for Remo Queens from her native Nigeria, in the Italian Serie A for ACF Trento. After their first Serie A season for Trento in 16 games, she scored 3 times and moved in August 2008 to ACF Milan. In Milan, she developed and by summer 2011, where she scored 19 goals in 52 games. At the beginning of the 2011–12 season she changed to FCF Como 2000. She played the winger and forward positions

=== International ===
Since 2010 she has been part of the extended squad of the Nigeria women's national football team.
