= John Obaro =

Nigerian technology entrepreneur

- Born: 19 April 1958 (age 67); Kogi State, Nigeria
- Occupation: Managing Director of SystemSpecs
- Years active: 1992 to the present

John Obaro is a Nigerian technology entrepreneur. He was the 2018 FATE Model Entrepreneur of the Year for his work as an entrepreneur and tech solutions provider at SystemSpecs. His company received the 'Next Bull’ award at the 5th Nigerian Stocks Exchange/ BusinessDay Top CEO awards in Lagos on May 10, 2019.
