= Margaret Ladipo =

Nigerian academic and researcher (born 1961)

- Born: Margaret Kudirat Ladipo; April 16, 1961 (age 65); Kaduna, Kaduna State, Nigeria
- Education: Ahmadu Bello University
- Occupations: academic; researcher
- Years active: 1982–present

Margaret Kudirat Ladipo (born April 16, 1961) is a Nigerian academic and researcher who served as the Rector of Yaba College of Technology from 2009 to 2017.

== Early life and education ==
Margaret is a native of Kwara State but she was born in Kaduna, Kaduna State, Nigeria. She completed her primary and secondary school education at Anglican Girls School, Kaduna, and Government Secondary School, Kaduna respectively.

Margaret holds a B.Sc certificate in Chemistry, an M.Sc certificate in Polymer Science and Technology, and a Ph.D in Analytical Chemistry from Ahmadu Bello University.

== Career ==
Margaret Ladipo's career first saw her gain employment as a Graduate Assistant at Ahmadu Bello University in 1982 before she proceeded to work as Lecturer III at Kaduna Polytechnic in 1984. In 1986, she joined Yaba College of Technology as Lecturer II where she rose through the ranks to become a Chief Lecturer in 2002. Prior to her appointment as Rector, she served as the polytechnic's Consult.

Margaret has authored two books and has published several articles in local and international journals. She is a fellow of the Institute of Operations Research of Nigeria, the Civilian Institute of Democratic Administration, and the Institute of Investment Management and Research.

== Scandals ==
Throughout her administration, Margaret has been accused of "money laundering" and "looting of funds" meant for the development of Yaba College of Technology.
