= Pharmacy Council of Nigeria =

Nigerian professional organization

- Abbreviation: PCN
- Predecessor: Pharmacists Council of Nigeria
- Headquarters: Abuja
- Location: Nigeria
- Registrar, CEO: Ibrahim Babashehu Ahmed
- Chairman, Governing Council: Alhaja Wosilat Giwa
- Website: www.pcn.gov.ng

The Pharmacy Council of Nigeria (PCN) is an agency of the federal government of Nigeria, established in 1992 to regulate and control the practice of pharmacy in Nigeria. Its responsibility is to oversee the practice of pharmacy across the country and supervise pharmaceutical education in Nigeria.

The council was previously known as the Pharmacists Council of Nigeria until 2022. After 2022, PCN became a government parastatal established by the Pharmacy Council of Nigeria Act 2022, charged with the responsibility of regulating and controlling pharmacy education, training and practice in all aspects and ramifications, including regulating pharmacy technicians and patent and proprietary medicines vendors (PPMVs).

== Functions ==
- It determines what standard of knowledge and skill are to be attained by persons seeking to become pharmacists in Nigeria
- Establishes and maintains a register of pharmacists and secures the publication from time to time of the list of those names as entered in the register
- Issues pharmacists oath and code of ethics
- Appoints pharmaceutical inspectors to ensure the enforcement of the provisions of the law by inspection and monitoring of premises where pharmaceutical endeavours take place
- Maintains a register of pharmacy technicians
- Responsible for registration and licensure of all pharmacists and pharmaceutical premises (in manufacturing, importation, distribution, wholesale, retail, etc.), as well as issuance of permits to pharmacy technicians and registration and licensure of patent and proprietary medicine vendors.

== Notable members ==
- Babalola Chinedum Peace
- Isa Marte Hussaini
- Jimi Agbaje
- Ahmed Tijani Mora
- Adelusi Adeluyi
