= Abdulmumini Hassan Rafindadi =

Nigerian academic

Vice chancellor of Federal University, Lokoja
- In office 2011 – February 2016

Personal details
- Born: 15 January 1957 (age 69) Katsina, Katsina State, Nigeria
- Party: Non-partisan
- Spouse: Hassana
- Occupation: Academic, medical doctor

Abdulmumini Hassan Rafindadi (born 15 January 1957) is a Nigerian professor of pathology, educational administrator, and pioneer vice chancellor of Federal University, Lokoja, located in Lokoja, Kogi State, Nigeria.

== Early life and education ==
He was born in Katsina, Katsina State. His parents were Hassan Rafindadi, one of the pioneer teachers at Katsina Middle School who later became the education councillor with the Katsina Native Authority and his mother Barira. Both his parents were natives of Katsina town. His early education was at Rafindadi Primary School in Katsina from 1963 to 1966. The family moved to Kaduna when his father was appointed as the first Education Commissioner in the newly created North Central State, one of the new 12 states just before the Nigerian Civil War started. He attended St Peter Demonstration Primary school in Kaduna 1966 to 1970. For his secondary school education, he was admitted to King's College Lagos, Government College Ibadan and the Barewa College Zaria. His father chose Barewa College possibly due to it being his own alma mata.

Rafindadi was educated at Barewa College, located in Zaria, Kaduna State, where he obtained the West Africa Secondary School Certificate in 1974, and was the first recipient of the Trophy for Academic Achievement in 1974. He later proceeded to Ahmadu Bello University, also located in Zaria, where he obtained a first degree in medicine.

== Career ==
After qualifying as a medical doctor he did his housemanship/internship rotations at the Ahmadu Bello University Teaching Hospital Kaduna and the General Hospital Katsina from 1980 to 1981. He did the National Youth Service Corps at the Police College, Enugu from 1981 to 1982. He started his working career with a private hospital, The Mayfair Clinic located in Zaria, Kaduna State for about two years before joining the service of the then Kaduna State before Katsina State was carved out of it. He was posted to General Hospital Funtua. He later headed the hospital as the medical officer in charge. From Funtua he proceeded to the University College Hospital Ibadan for his residency training in Pathology from 1986 to 1990. He was the chief resident in the Department of Pathology in the 1990. He spent one year in attachment at the General Hospital Southampton, UK from 1989 to 1990. He became a fellow of the National Postgraduate Medical College of Nigeria in Pathology in 1990 on his return from the UK. He worked as a consultant pathologist with the Ministry of Health, Katsina State in the General Hospital Katsina from 1990 to 1994, before he joined the Ahmadu Bello University Zaria as Lecturer. He joined the service of Ahmadu Bello University in 1994 as a lecturer and in 2004 he was appointed a professor of pathology.

In 2006, Rafindadi was appointed as the dean of the faculty of medicine of Ahmadu Bello University, a position he held for two years (2006–2008). After his tenure as the dean of faculty of medicine, Rafindadi was appointed as the chief medical director of the Ahmadu Bello University Teaching Hospital in 2008, a position he held until 2011 when he was appointed as the pioneer vice chancellor of the newly established Federal University, Lokoja, a post he held until February 2016 at the end of his 5-year term. He has since returned to the Faculty of Medicine in the Ahmadu Bello University, Zaria as a Professor of Pathology.

== See also ==
- List of pathologists
- List of vice chancellors in Nigeria
