= Lucy Jumeyi Ogbadu =

Nigerian microbiologist

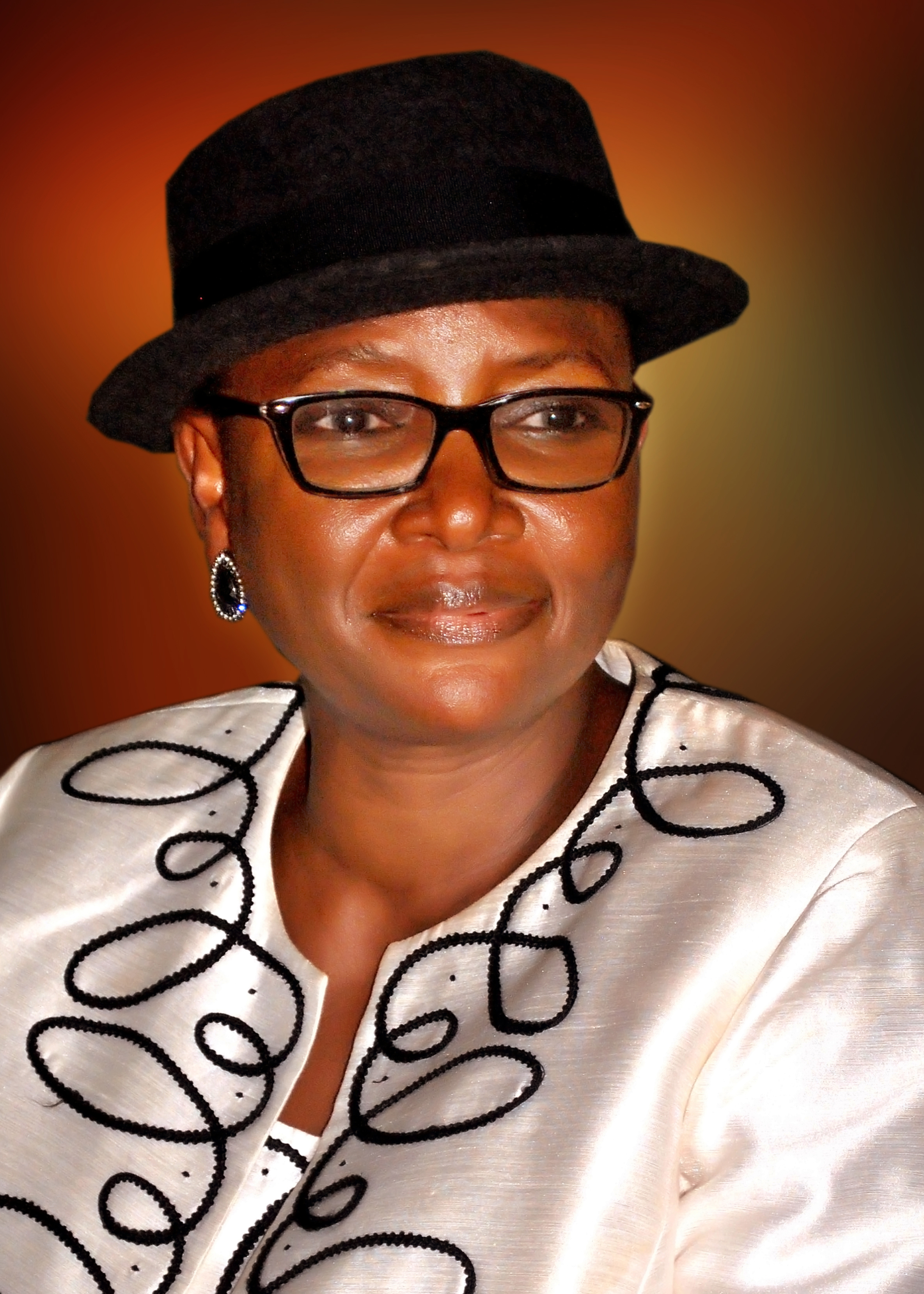
Professor Ogbadu

Lucy Jumeyi Ogbadu // (born 25 September 1953) is a Nigerian microbiologist and served as the Director General/CEO of the National Biotechnology Development Agency (NABDA), a research agency under the Nigerian Ministry of Science & Technology until the expiration of her tenure in 2018.

== Career ==
Before assuming duty as the Director General/CEO of NABDA in November 2013, Ogbadu had lectured at her alma mater Ahmadu Bello University, Zaria, for twenty years and later at Benue State University, Makurdi, for another six years. In 2002 she was appointed Director of Research and Development at NABDA and later served as the Director of Bioentrepreneurship from 2004 to 2005. Ogbadu also served in an acting capacity as the Director General/CEO of NABDA for three months in 2005, and afterwards became head of the department of Food and Industrial Biotechnology at the NABDA from 2005 to 2011. She also served as director of research from 2011 until 2013, when she was appointed to her current position.

Ogbadu initiated the technology transfer on the "Temporary Immersion Bioreactor System" from AZUTECNIA of Cuba into Nigeria for mass production of elite plantlets. She also facilitated the signing of a memorandum of understanding on vaccine production between Finlay of Cuba and Nigeria (FMST, Federal University of Technology, Minna and CDC co-opted) in early 2013.

During her period of service as the acting Director General, Ogbadu restored Nigeria's membership of the International Centre for Genetic Engineering and Biotechnology. Other biotechnology projects were initiated through collaboration with the Food and Agriculture Organization of the United Nations under the South South cooperation during this period.

At the outset of the 2014 West African Ebola virus epidemic, NABDA under her leadership developed probes and primers for detecting Ebola virus disease. The kits were capable of diagnoses within 24 hours of contacting the virus, even before symptoms start manifesting, thereby preventing the spread of the disease. This was achieved in collaboration with the South Korean biotechnology company Bioneer.

Under two years of her leadership as Director General, she succeeded in pushing for the passage of Nigeria's Biosafety Bill, which had been in limbo since its inception in 2002, into law. Similarly, the Biotechnology Bill has received approval of the Federal Executive Council within the same period and is now before the National Assembly. A five-year biotechnology Strategic Plan has also been developed for the first time and is currently being implemented.

== Publications ==
Ogbadu has published over 40 refereed journal/book of her research findings, 87 percent of which are in reputable international journals and the rest in local journals/books of high ranking. Ogbadu has contributed chapters to the Elsevier Encyclopedia of Food Microbiology. She has presented over 22 Seminar and Conference Papers at various scientific gatherings.
