= SystemSpecs =

Nigerian computer software company

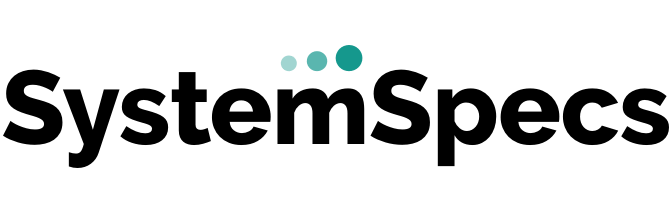
- Type: Private
- Industry: Online payments Financial services
- Founded: 1991; 35 years ago
- Founder: John Obaro
- Headquarters: Lagos, Nigeria
- Key people: Ernest Ndukwe, Chairman; John Obaro, Group Managing Director
- Services: Payment service provider Payment gateway
- Divisions: Remita, HumanManager, Deelaa
- Website: systemspecs.com.ng

SystemSpecs is a Nigerian computer software company based in Lagos.

The company develops software solutions for payments, financial services, payroll, and public sector systems in Nigeria and parts of Africa.

In 2024, SystemSpecs introduced a new corporate identity and restructured its operations into four business units: infrastructure and payment gateway; applications and vertical markets; human capital solutions and services; and public sector and special projects.

== History ==
Systemspecs was founded in 1991 by John Obaro. It was then more like a business-to-business company selling software to organisations. SystemSpecs started as a five-man partner agent and value added reseller for SunSystems, an accounting package developed by Systems Union, UK, (now Infor).

The indigenous company developed HumanManager, a payroll human resource management and goal management software package. This was developed with object-oriented COBOL. Media reports indicate that it enjoyed wide market acceptability with over 200 organizations across Africa as at 2004. TheSOFTtribe of Ghana signed a partnership deal with SystemSpecs in 2006 to provide 'HumanManager' for the Ghanaian market. The agreement authorized TheSOFTtribe to become a Ghanaian partner of SystemSpecs for marketing, deployment and professional support of HumanManager. HumanManager went on to become "well established within the sub-regional ICT market." HumanManager was described by the Nigerian media as "Nigeria's most successful software yet" when SystemSpecs launched HumanManager 4.0 in December 2002. The solution passed "a world-class automated Quality Assurance test" in 2004.

Infor FMS SunSystems and Infor PM are other SystemSpecs products. SystemSpecs developed financial remittance software called Remita.

Deelaa, a subsidiary of SystemSpecs was launched in 2022 as an e-ticketing and a marketplace for shopping, lifestyle, and travel. Deelaa e-commerce caters to both B2B and B2C sectors.

== The Treasury Single Account Controversy ==
A Nigerian senator, Dino Melaye had claimed that the appointment of Remita, which he erroneously described as "an e-collection agent", was a violation of section 162 (1) of the Nigerian Constitution. He claimed that the constitution only recognised a banking institution to be the collector of government funds, and that Remita was not a bank. The senator said the one per cent commission charged by SystemSpecs for all revenues collected on behalf of the government from the various ministries, departments and agencies must be returned to the account of the Central Bank of Nigeria. He estimated the amount of commission collected by SystemSpecs to be twenty-five billion naira.

In a letter titled “Commencement of Federal Government independent revenue collection under the Treasury Single Account (TSA) initiative” addressed to the press, the Central Bank of Nigeria refuted the senator's claims, describing them as "misleading". Nonetheless, SystemSpecs, as a "business decision" speedily obeyed CBN's directive that all the revenues made so far be returned pending the issue would be resolved. The Nigerian Senate consequently ordered its committee on finance and public accounts to "commence an investigation into the use of Remita since the inception of the TSA policy. Founder and Managing Director of SystemSpecs, developers of the Remita application, John Obaro, refuted claims that the company pocketed 25 billion Naira. Obaro explained that the one per cent commission was negotiated prior to the signing of the contract; and the one per cent commission was shared by SystemSpecs, participating commercial banks and the Central Bank of Nigeria in the ratio of 50:40:10 respectively. PremiumTimes, an online news platform, released a report titled 'Full details of TSA: Dino Melaye misled Nigerian Senate on N25 billion claim' which cited holes in the senator's claims and allegations.

The Joint Senate investigative committee also absolved SystemSpecs of any wrongdoing as “the committee could not ascertain the deduction/collection of twenty-five billion Naira (N25 billion) by SystemSpecs as 1% fee charged for the use of its Remita platform within the period under investigation.” .
