= Umaru Shehu =

Nigerian academic (1930–2023)

Professor Emeritus Umaru Shehu CON, CFR
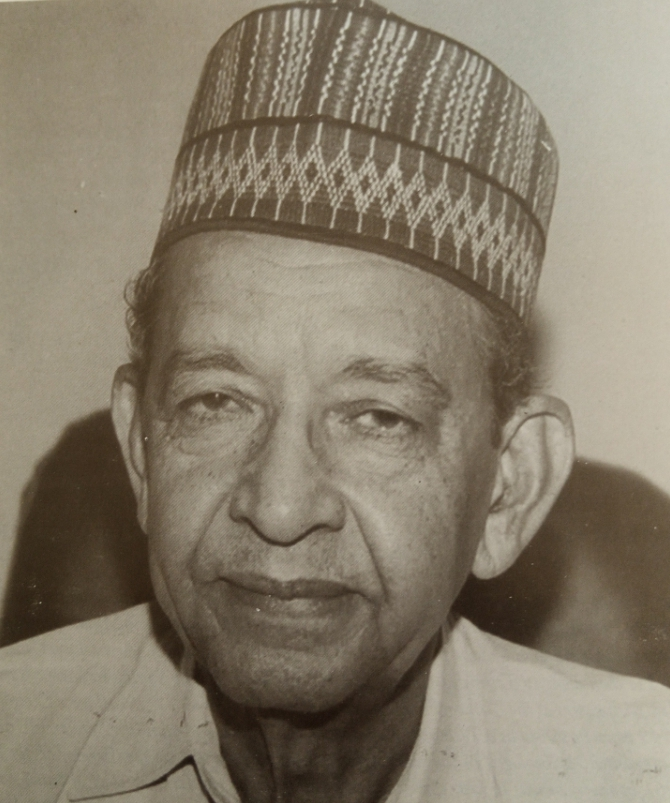
- Born: 8 December 1930; Maiduguri, Colony and Protectorate of Nigeria (now in Borno State)
- Died: 2 October 2023 (aged 92); Maiduguri, Nigeria
- Education: University of Ibadan; University of Liverpool; University of London
- Occupations: educator; medical practitioner; researcher
- Spouse: Tuha
- Children: Mahmoud; Musa; Hassana

Umaru Shehu CON, CFR (8 December 1930 – 2 October 2023) was a Nigerian physician and academic administrator. He held significant positions in several universities, including the University of Nigeria, Nsukka, Ahmadu Bello University, and the University of Maiduguri. He was the chairman of the board of directors of the Institute of Human Virology, Nigeria (IHVN).

== Early life and education ==
Umaru Shehu was born in Maiduguri on 8 December 1930, in the then Borno province (now Borno state) of the North-Eastern State in Northern Nigeria.

Shehu attended elementary school in Maiduguri from 1935 to 1940, followed by middle school from 1941 to 1943. From 1944 to 1947, he studied at Kaduna College in Zaria, and then proceeded to University College Ibadan from 1948 to 1953. He also spent time at the University of Liverpool in two separate periods, between 1953 and 1956, and again from 1966 to 1967. Shehu obtained his Medical degree from the University of London.

== Career ==
=== Early career ===
In 1957, after completing his medical education, Shehu began working as a pre-registration house surgeon at the Southport Infirmary in the United Kingdom. Later that same year, he returned to the Government of Northern Nigeria and served as a pre-registration house physician. He gradually climbed the ranks within the medical field, holding the positions of medical officer from 1957 to 1963, senior medical officer from 1963 to 1965, principal medical officer from 1965 to 1966, assistant chief medical officer from 1966 to 1967, and chief medical officer in the Preventive Services Division from 1967 to 1968.

=== University career ===
==== Ahmadu Bello University ====
Following his tenure in the Preventive Services Division, Shehu was offered a position as the permanent secretary of the Ministry of Health and chief medical officer in the North-Eastern State. However, he declined the offer and instead chose to join Ahmadu Bello University (ABU). He became a reader and acting head of the Department of Community Medicine from 1968 to 1970 becoming the department's first ever head. During this period, he also served as the deputy dean of the Faculty of Medicine and acted as the director of the Institute of Health from 1969 to 1970. In 1970, he attained the position of professor of community medicine and became the head of the Department of Community Medicine, a role he held from 1970 to 1978. Additionally, Shehu served as the director of the Institute of Health from 1970 to 1977 and took on the responsibilities of deputy vice chancellor from 1975 to 1976. Finally, he assumed the position of pro vice chancellor from 1977 to 1978.

==== University of Maiduguri ====
During his tenure at the University of Maiduguri, Shehu has held significant positions and made notable contributions to the institution. Since 1991, he has served as an honorary consultant physician, a position he held until his death. In recognition of his accomplishments and contributions, he was appointed as a professor emeritus in 2000. Additionally, Shehu served as the provost of the College of Medical Sciences at the university from 1991 to 1993. Furthermore, Shehu took on the responsibility of sole administrator of the University of Maiduguri from 1993 to 1994, assuming a crucial interim leadership role during that period.

==== At other universities ====
In 1978, he assumed the role of vice chancellor at the University of Nigeria, Nsukka, where he made significant contributions to the academic and administrative development of the institution until 1980. At the University College Hospital Ibadan, he served as the chairman of the board of management from 1991 to 1994, providing strategic guidance and oversight to the hospital's operations. Shehu held the positions of pro-chancellor and chairman of the governing council at Bayero University, Kano, from 1993 to 1996. Subsequently, from 1996 to 1999, he served as the pro-chancellor and chairman of the governing council at the University of Lagos. In these roles, he played a crucial role in the governance and strategic direction of the respective universities.

=== Career with International and National Health Organisations ===
Shehu served as the president of Medical Schools in Africa from 1973 to 1975. Additionally, he took on the role of external examiner in public health at the University of Ghana Medical School. He has also chaired the boards of the National Agency for the Control of AIDS (NACA) and STOPAIDS. Furthermore, Shehu has served as a patron in various healthcare-related organizations, including the Guild of Medical Directors, Nationwide Network for Health, Nigerian Medical Forum of Great Britain and Ireland, and the Nigerian Institute of Stress.

Shehu also served as a trustee for the National Foundation on Vesicovaginal Fistula (VVF). Moreover, he has been a member of the board of trustees for the Nigerian Tuberculosis and Leprosy Association.

In terms of publications, Shehu has made contributions to medical journals. He has served as a member of the editorial board for the West African Medical Journal and as a consulting editor for the Nigerian Medical Practitioner. Additionally, he has held the role of editorial adviser for the Nigerian Postgraduate Medical Journal. Notably, he has served as a joint editor-in-chief for the British Medical Journal West Africa edition. He served as the chairman of the board of directors of the Institute of Human Virology, Nigeria (IHVN) until his death.

==== Work with WHO ====
Professor Shehu also worked closely with the World Health Organization (WHO) in various capacities. His involvement began in 1970 when he served as a Short Term Consultant for the Working Group on Health Services and Manpower Development Mechanism in Geneva. He continued to collaborate with WHO, serving as a Temporary Adviser from October 1970 and as a Short Term Consultant from 1971 to 1973. In 1974, Shehu acted as a Consultant for Technical Discussions at the 24th WHO Regional Committee for Africa. Subsequently, he held key roles such as the National WHO Program Coordinator/Representative in Nigeria from 1980 to 1985, where he contributed to the implementation of WHO programs within the country.

From 1985 to 1989, he served as the Director of the WHO Sub-Regional Health Development Office III, providing leadership and guidance for health development activities in the sub-region.

In 1990, Professor Shehu assumed the position of WHO Representative to Ethiopia, further extending his expertise in the promotion of health and healthcare services in the country.

== Death ==
Umaru Shehu died on 2 October 2023, at the age of 92. He was survived by his wife Tuha and his children: Mahmoud and twins Musa and Hassana.

== Awards and honours ==
Shehu held Honorary Doctor of Science Degrees of Ahmadu Bello University and the University of Nigeria, Nsukka. In 1979, the Government of Nigeria awarded him the Commander of the Order of the Niger (CON), and in 2000 he was awarded the Commander of the Federal Republic (CFR). Furthermore, in 2014, President Goodluck Jonathan presented him with the Centenary award, a prestigious recognition commemorating Nigeria's 100 years of existence as a nation.
