= Ramadan in Nigeria =

Ramadan is a significant religious and cultural observance in Nigeria, which has a large Muslim population. It is marked by fasting, prayer, charity, and community gatherings, with influences from Nigeria's varying ethnic groups and local traditions. The observance is particularly prominent in the northern regions, where Islam has deep historical roots, but it is also practiced widely across other parts of the country.

== History ==
Ramadan came to Nigeria through Muslim traders and clerics from North Africa between the 11th and 15th century. Islam first came to Borno, in the northeast of the country, and then spread further to Hausaland and beyond. The Fulani people also played a role in further Islamisation of the region. In 1803, the Fulani scholar Uthman dan Fodio (also called Uthman Ibn Fodio) started a jihad with which he hoped to 'revive' and 'purify' Islam. This jihad resulted in the unification of Hausa states under sharia law, which led to the emergence of the Sokoto Caliphate in 1812. The Caliphate ended in 1903 when the British overtook the state and incorporated it into the colonial state of Nigeria. During British colonial rule, Muslims continued to observe Ramadan, which some scholars write even contributed to the mass acceptance and consolidation of Islam as a major religion. After Nigeria’s independence in 1960, it remained a major religious tradition.

== Commencement and religious authority ==
The beginning of Ramadan in Nigeria is determined by the sighting of the crescent moon. The Nigerian Supreme Council for Islamic Affairs (NSCIA), led by the Sultan of Sokoto, announces the official start and end of the month. This announcement is broadcast nationwide through radio, television, and social media.

== Fasting and daily practices ==
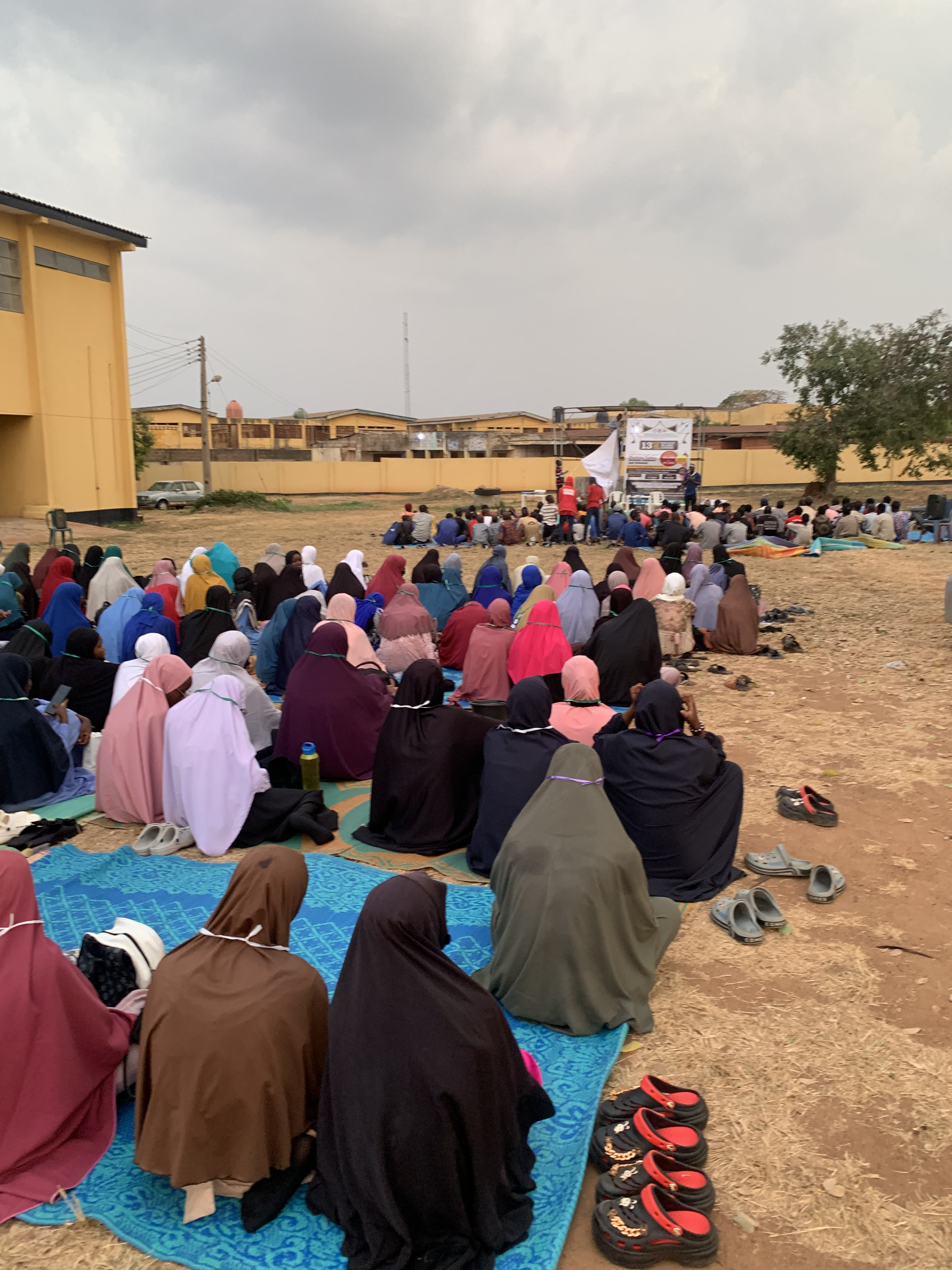
Ramadan lecture

Muslims in Nigeria fast from dawn (suhoor) until sunset (iftar), abstaining from food, drink, and other physical needs during daylight hours. The fast is typically broken with dates and water, followed by meals that often include rice, soups, and meat dishes. Suhoor, the pre-dawn meal, enables those observing to have energy through the day. Daily life during Ramadan is reshaped, with work schedules, school hours, and public activities often adjusted to accommodate fasting and prayer.

== Prayers and worship ==
Mosques across Nigeria see increased attendance during Ramadan, particularly for the nightly Tarawih prayers. Special sermons and Qur’an recitations are common, and many Muslims aim to complete the reading of the entire Qur’an during the month. Spiritual reflection and devotion are emphasized, with Ramadan serving as a period of heightened religious consciousness.

== Charity and community ==
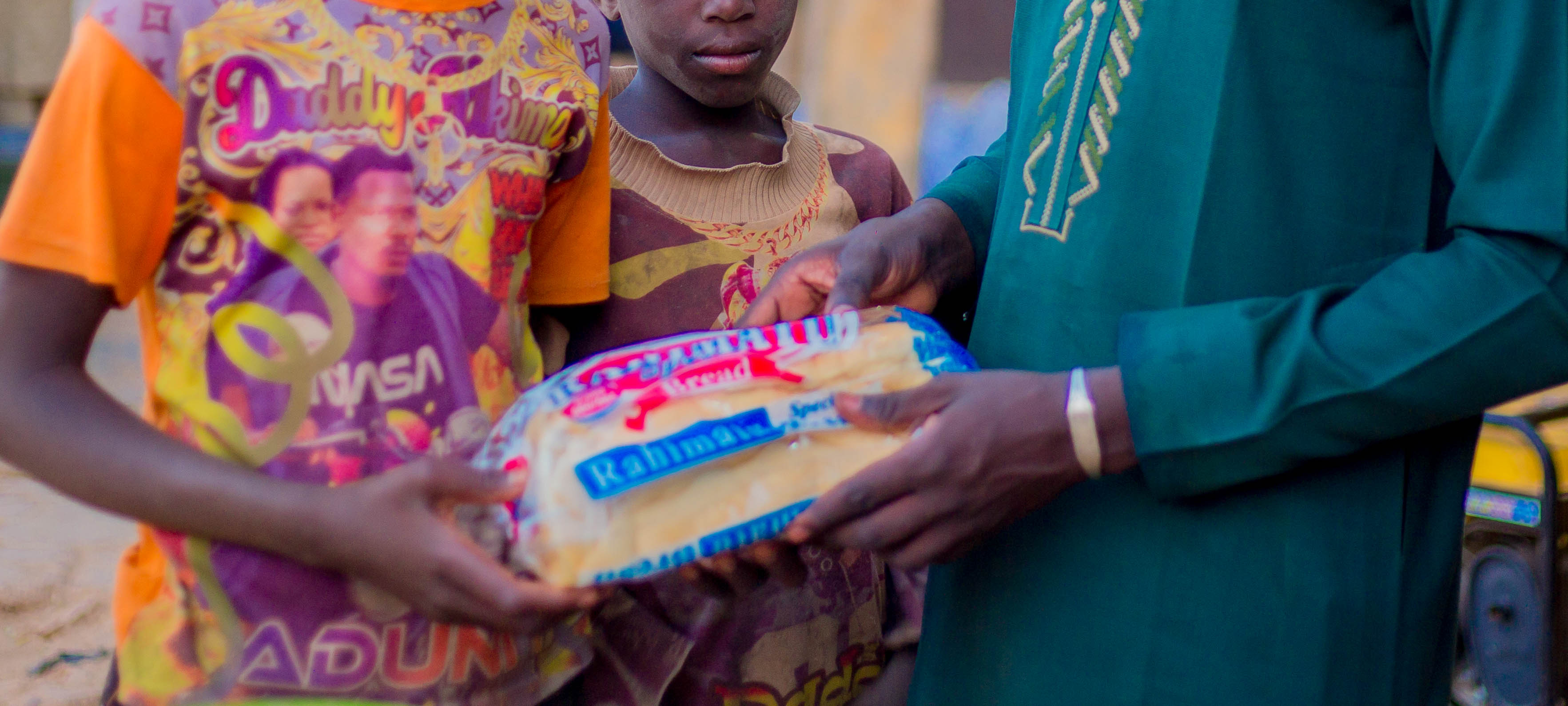
A man offers charity to an Almajiri boy in Katsina State, Northern Nigeria, during Ramadan.

Charity (Zakat and Sadaqah) is a central aspect of Ramadan in Nigeria. Wealthier individuals and organizations often provide food and financial assistance to the less privileged. Community iftar gatherings are widespread, fostering unity and social cohesion.

== Cultural traditions ==
While Ramadan is observed according to Islamic principles, Nigerian Muslims incorporate local customs into the month's practices. One notable tradition is Tashe, a cultural performance in Northern Nigeria where children dress in costumes, sing, and perform in the evenings during Ramadan. Tashe is both entertainment and a way of reinforcing communal bonds.

== Geographic and ethnic diversity ==
Nigeria's Muslim population is concentrated in the northern states, particularly among the Hausa-Fulani, Kanuri, and Nupe ethnic groups. However, significant Muslim communities also exist in southwestern Nigeria among the Yoruba, and in smaller numbers across other regions. This diversity influences the foods, languages, and cultural expressions associated with Ramadan, making the observance a reflection of Nigeria's pluralistic society.

== Eid al-Fitr ==
The end of Ramadan is marked by the festival of Eid al-Fitr. In Nigeria, large communal prayers are held in open fields and mosques, followed by feasts, family visits, and cultural festivities. Traditional clothing is worn, and gifts are exchanged. Eid celebrations highlight both religious devotion and Nigeria's cultural diversity, with regional variations in food and customs.

== See also ==
- Islam in Nigeria
- Religion in Nigeria
