= Ahmadu Bello University =

Public University in Zaria, Nigeria

Coordinates: 11°04′N 7°42′E

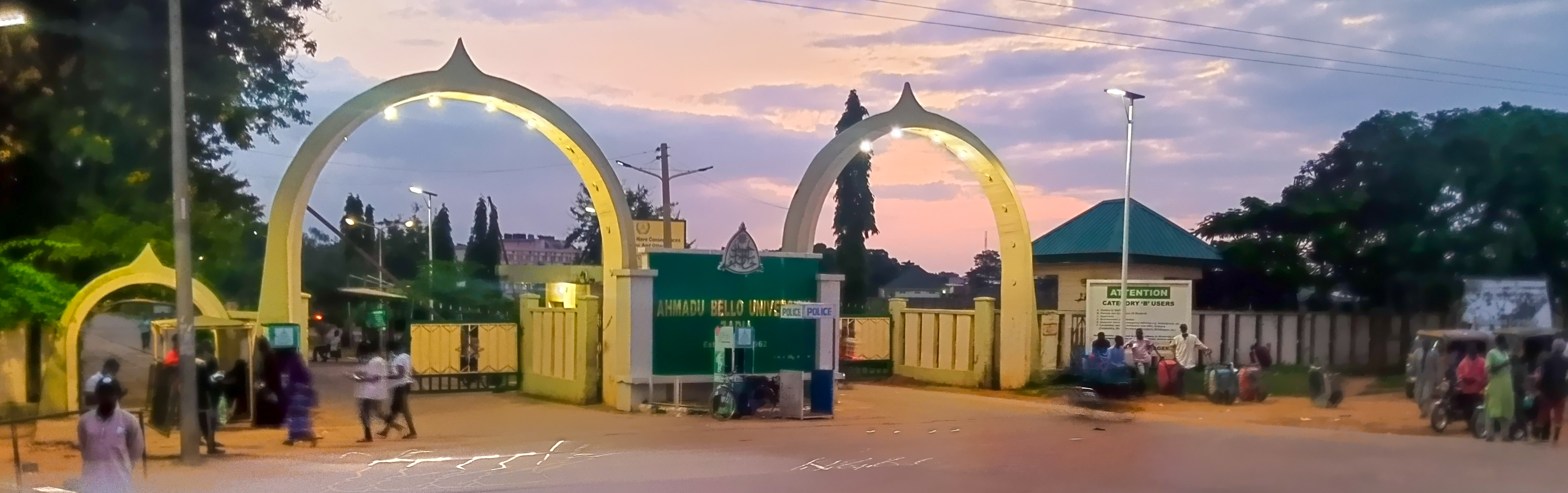
- North Gate of the Samaru campus, 2021
- Former name: University of Northern Nigeria
- Type: Public, research
- Established: 4 October 1962
- Chancellor: Alfred Achebe
- Vice-Chancellor: Adamu Ahmed
- Academic staff: 2900+
- Students: 50,000+
- Location: Zaria, Kaduna State, Nigeria
- Campus: Urban
- Colours: Green and white
- Nickname: ABU
- Website: abu.edu.ng
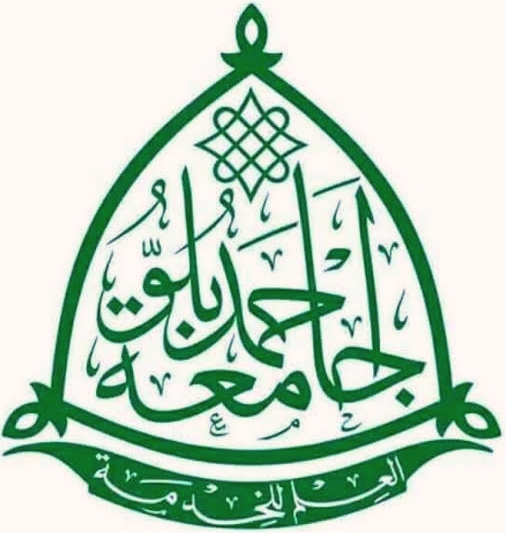

The Ahmadu Bello University (ABU) is a public research university located in Zaria, Kaduna State, Nigeria. It was opened in 1962 as the University of Northern Nigeria.

The university has four colleges, three schools, 18 faculties, 110 academic departments, 17 centres, and seven institutes, with over 600 professors, about 3000 academic staff and over 7000 non-teaching staff. The university has over 400 postgraduate programmes reflecting its strife to become a postgraduate studies-centred university. The university operates from two campuses in the ancient cosmopolitan city of Zaria, the Samaru Campus, where the Senate Building and most of the faculties are located and the Kongo Campus, hosting the faculties of Law and Administration. It has been adjudged to be the largest university in Sub-Saharan Africa (next to Cairo University) in terms of land occupied, owing to the numerous buildings it has.

On 5 February 2025 the Governing Council of Ahmadu Bello University appointed Prof. Adamu Ahmed as the new vice chancellor.

Samaru is where admission of new students takes place.

== History ==
=== First years ===
As Nigeria approached independence on 1 October 1960, its only degree-awarding institution was in Ibadan. The Ashby Report, published a month before independence, supported regional government proposals to add new universities in each of Nigeria's then three regions, and its capital Lagos.

In May 1960, the Northern Region had upgraded the School of Arabic Studies in Kano to become the Ahmadu Bello College for Arabic and Islamic Studies, and following the Ashby Report, it was decided to create a University of Northern Nigeria at Zaria rather than Kano. The new university was to take over facilities of the Nigerian College of Arts, Science and Technology at Samaru; the Ahmadu Bello College in Kano; the Agricultural Research Institute at Samaru; the Institute of Administration at Zaria, and the Veterinary Research Institute at Vom on the Jos Plateau. Legislation establishing the new university was passed by the Northern Region legislature in 1961.

When the university opened on 4 October 1962, it had four faculties comprising 15 departments, and a total of 426 students.

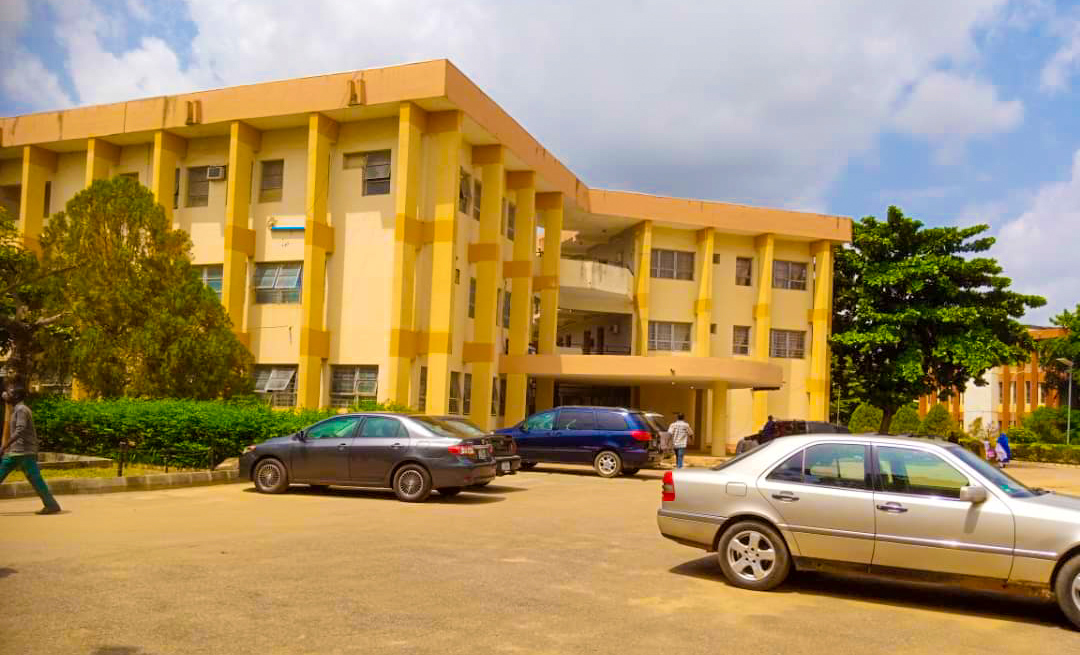
Department of Microbiology, 2021

The challenges were enormous. Over 60 years of British colonial rule, education in the Northern Region had lagged far behind that of the two southern regions. Few students from the North had qualifications for university entrance, and fewer still northerners had qualifications for teaching appointments. Of the original student body, only 147 were from the north.

The university's first vice chancellor was British, as were most professorial appointments. In the first round of faculty appointments the only two Nigerians were mathematician Iya Abubakar and educationist Adamu Baikie. Facilities on the main Samaru campus were inadequate, and integration of physically separate, pre-existing institutions was difficult.

Nevertheless, under the vice chancellorship of New Zealander Norman Alexander, academic and administrative staff were recruited, new departments and programmes were created, major building projects were undertaken, and student enrollment grew rapidly. By the end of Alexander's tenure in 1966, there were a thousand students enrolled.

=== Middle 1970s ===
Alexander was succeeded by the university's first native Nigerian vice chancellor, Ishaya Shuaibu Audu. He was a pediatrician; former associate professor at the University of Lagos, and Hausa born in Wusasa, near Zaria.

Ahmadu Bello University was seriously affected by the coups and anti-Igbo riots of 1966 but continued to expand. Student enrollment had been constrained by A-level training at secondary schools so in 1968, the university established its own School of Basic Studies to provide pre-degree training on campus. Students entering the School of Basic Studies could matriculate and complete a bachelor's degree in four years.

Despite opposition to the School of Basic Studies, it provided a stream of candidates for degree courses and the university expanded rapidly. Ten years after being founded there were over 7,000 students, over half in degree programs and 2,333 had graduated. The University of Ibadan had graduated only 615 in its first ten years.

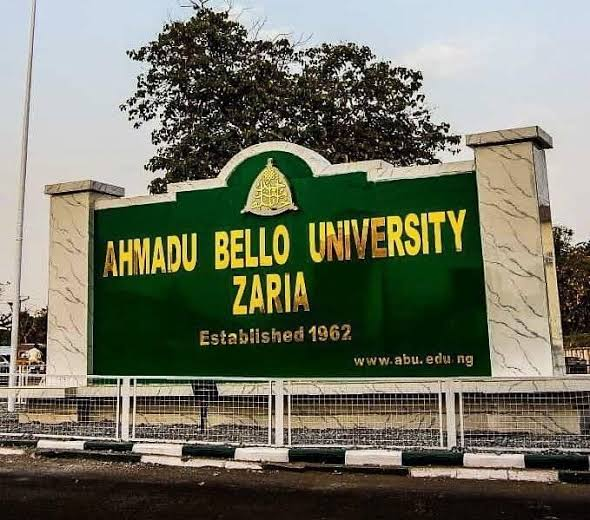
North gate of campus, 2021

Kongo campus, close to Zaria old city taught public administration and provided in-service training for local government throughout the north of Nigeria. The Faculty of Education taught and also managed teacher training colleges across the northern states. At Kano campus, renamed Abdullahi Bayero College, Hausa, Arabic and Islamic studies courses were taught.

Although founded to be the University of Northern Nigeria, commentators have observed that more than any other of Nigeria's universities, Ahmadu Bello has universally served students from every state of the Nigerian federation.

Professorial staffing to serve the burgeoning student enrollments and course offerings was a potential limitation during this period. In the early 1970s relatively abundant funding made it possible to send some senior academic staff to overseas institutions to complete advanced degrees. A small but increasing number of Nigerians with Ph.D.s or other advanced degrees were returning from abroad but ABU had to compete with other Nigerian universities to recruit them. In the meantime, appointment of expatriate teaching staff was essential and it expanded greatly and diversified in nationalities. Vice chancellor Audu endeavored to balance the goals of Nigerianization and northernization of ABU's professors with the commitment to maintaining all programmes at an international level of academic quality.

By 1975, this balance was strained. The teaching faculty remained more than half expatriate overall; at senior levels still more so. The development of Nigerian staffing (and especially of northern-origin teaching staff) was perceived as too slow. In 1975, ABU turned toward a much heavier emphasis on internal staff development as it adopted the Graduate Assistantship programme. Under this programme, the best graduates from the departments' undergraduate programmes are recruited to join the department as staff-in-training and undertake advanced training as they gain on-the-job experience. Within a few years, a significant proportion of ABU senior staff were products of the internal training programme. From 1975, the proportion of expatriate teaching staff diminished rapidly.

=== Later development ===
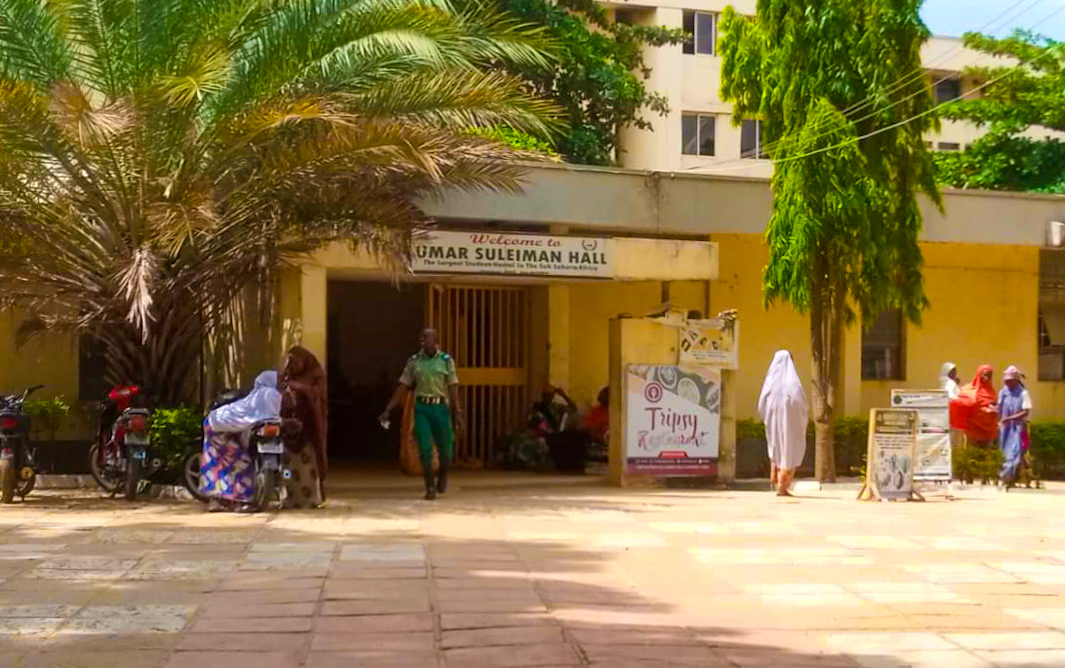
Umar Suleiman Hall, 2021

Beginning in the early 1980s, the university was hit with sharply reduced funding as the International Monetary Fund and World Bank imposed their Structural Adjustment Programme on the country. The value of the Nigeria's currency plummeted in relation to others and staff salaries reduced in real terms. Funding for premises, library acquisitions, and other resources was curtailed. Competition for students, staff and funding with other national institutions in what had been a rapidly expanding university system increased.

During a peaceful May 1986 university rally against implementation of the Nigerian government austerity policy called the Structural Adjustment Programme, security forces killed 20 demonstrators and bystanders. Over the years, ABU has been affected by national political instability. The very fact of ABU's strikingly "national character" (in drawing students and staff from an unusually broad range of Nigeria's regional, ethnic and religious communities) might be the reason the institution is inclined to internal instability. Hence, ABU has been among Nigeria's universities that have suffered most from closures.

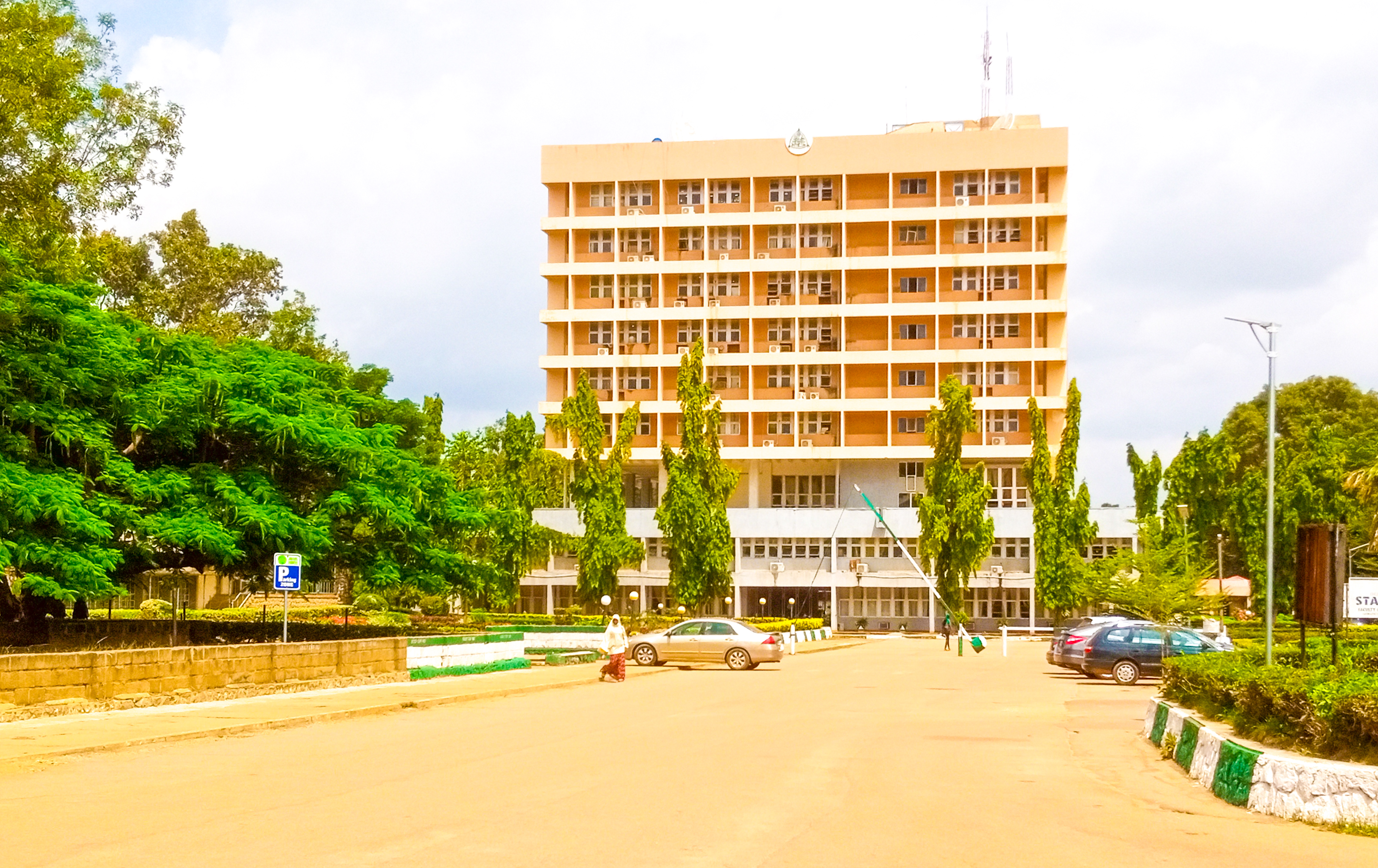
Senate Building, 2021

Yet ABU continues to occupy a particularly important place among Nigerian universities. As it approaches its half-century anniversary, ABU can claim to be the largest and the most extensive of universities in Sub-Saharan Africa. It covers a land area of 7,000 hectares (27 mi^{2}) and encompasses 18 academic faculties, a college of postgraduate studies and 100 academic departments. It has seven institutes, six specialized centers, a Division of Agricultural Colleges, demonstration secondary and primary schools, as well as extension and consultancy services which provide services to the wider society. The total student enrollment in the university's degree and sub-degree programme is about 35,000, drawn from every state of Nigeria, Africa, and the rest of world. There are about 1,400 academic and research staff and 5,000 support staff.

The university has nurtured two new institutions: Bayero University Kano and the Abubakar Tafawa Balewa University of Technology, Bauchi. Some 30 tertiary institutions made up of colleges of education, polytechnics and schools of basic or preliminary studies are affiliated to it.

Despite the numerous achievements of this reputable institution, there are some challenges that the Institution faces. These challenges vary from one section to another. For instance, in terms of infrastructure, the school does not have enough classrooms for the students from some sections. Based on that, clashes occur on venues especially in the morning when most classes hold. Again, even for sections that have classrooms, those classes tend to be unfit for the number of the students. Another challenge that has not yet been checked relating to infrastructure is that of hostels or Hall of residence as it's widely known. The hostels available for students are not capable of accommodating all the students interested in residing within the campus. As a result of that, many new students are stranded on the campus especially at the beginning of the session, and others that are lucky get squatting spaces with friends and family that have already gotten hostels.

== Administration ==
Ahmadu Bello University has a chancellor as its ceremonial head, while the vice-chancellor is chief executive and academic officer. The vice-chancellor is usually appointed for a five-year, non-renewable term.

Vice chancellors
		Tenure	Profession
1	Norman Alexander	1961–1966	Physicist
2	Ishaya Audu	1966–1975	Medical doctor
3	Iya Abubakar	1975–1978	Mathematician
4	Oladipo Akikugbe	1978–1979	Medical doctor
5	Ango Abdullahi	1979–1986	Agricultural scientist
6	Adamu N Muhammad	1986–1991	Entomologist
7	Daniel Iyorkegh Saror	1991–1995	Veterinarian
8	Major-General Mamman Kontagora	1995–1998	(Note: Sole-administrator appointed by then head of state Sani Abacha after a major conflict.)
9	Abdullahi Mahadi	1999–2004	Historian
10	Shehu Usman Abdullahi	2004–2009	Veterinarian
11	Jarlath Udoudo Umoh	2009–2009	Veterinarian
12	Aliyu Mohammed	2009–2010	Linguist (English)
13	Abdullahi Mustapha	2010–2015	Pharmacist
14	Ibrahim Garba	2015–2020	Geologist
15	Kabir Bala	2020–2025	Construction
16	Adamu Ahmed	2025–present	Urban and Regional planner

== Faculties and schools ==
The list of the university's faculty and their respective courses follows.

=== Faculty of Art ===
Departments under the faculty:

- African Languages and cultures
- Arabic
- Archaeology and History
- English and Literary Studies
- French
- History
- Philosophy
- Theatre and Performing Arts

=== Faculty of Education ===
Departments under the faculty:

- Educational Psychology and Counselling
- Arts and Social Science Education
- Library and Information science
- Vocational and Technical Education (VTE)
- Human Kinetics & Health Education
- Science Education
- Educational Foundations and Curriculum (DEDUFC)

=== Faculty of Engineering ===
Departments under the faculty:

- Electrical and Computer Engineering
- Mechanical Engineering
- Metallurgical and Materials Engineering
- Computer Engineering
- Electronics and Telecommunication Engineering
- Civil Engineering
- Chemical Engineering
- Agricultural and Bio-Resources Engineering
- Water Resources and Environmental Engineering
- Polymer and Textile Engineering

=== Faculty of Environmental Design ===
Departments under the faculty:

- Architecture
- Building
- Fine Arts
- Geomatics
- Glass and Silicone Technology
- Industrial Design
- Urban and Regional Planning
- Quantity Surveying
- Geomatics (Land Surveying)

=== Faculty of Life Sciences ===
Departments under the faculty:

- Biochemistry
- Biology
- Botany
- Microbiology
- Zoology

=== Faculty of Physical Science ===
Departments under the faculty:

- Chemistry
- Computer Science
- Geography
- Geology
- Mathematics
- Physics
- Statistics
- Polymer and Textile Science

=== Faculty of Veterinary Medicine ===
Departments under the faculty:

- Veterinary Medicine
- Veterinary Anatomy
- Veterinary Microbiology
- Veterinary Physiology
- Veterinary Pathology
- Veterinary Parasitology and Entomology
- Veterinary Pharmacology and Toxicology
- Veterinary Public Health and Preventive Medicine
- Veterinary Surgery and Radiology
- Veterinary Theriogenology and Production

=== Faculty of Administration ===
Departments under the faculty:

- Accounting
- Business Administration
- Public Administration
- Local Government and Development Studies

=== Faculty of Agriculture ===
Departments under the faculty:

- Soil Science
- Agricultural Economics
- Agricultural Extension and Rural Development
- Agronomy
- Animal Science
- Crop Protection
- Plant Science

=== Faculty of Law ===
Departments under the faculty:

- Public Law
- Private Law
- Commercial Law
- Islamic Law

=== Business School ===
Departments under the faculty:

- Accounting
- Actuarial Science & Insurance
- Banking And Finance
- Business Administration
- Economics
- Marketing

=== Faculty of Basic Medical Science ===
Departments under the faculty:

- Human Anatomy
- Human Physiology
- Medical Biochemistry

=== Faculty of Social Sciences ===
Departments under the faculty

- Economics
- Mass Communication
- Political Science and International Studies
- Sociology

== Library ==
Kashim Ibrahim Library (KIL) serves university students and academic staff from the main campus and satellites. As of 2006, its collections include over 1.2 million books; 66,000 periodicals, and other learning materials.

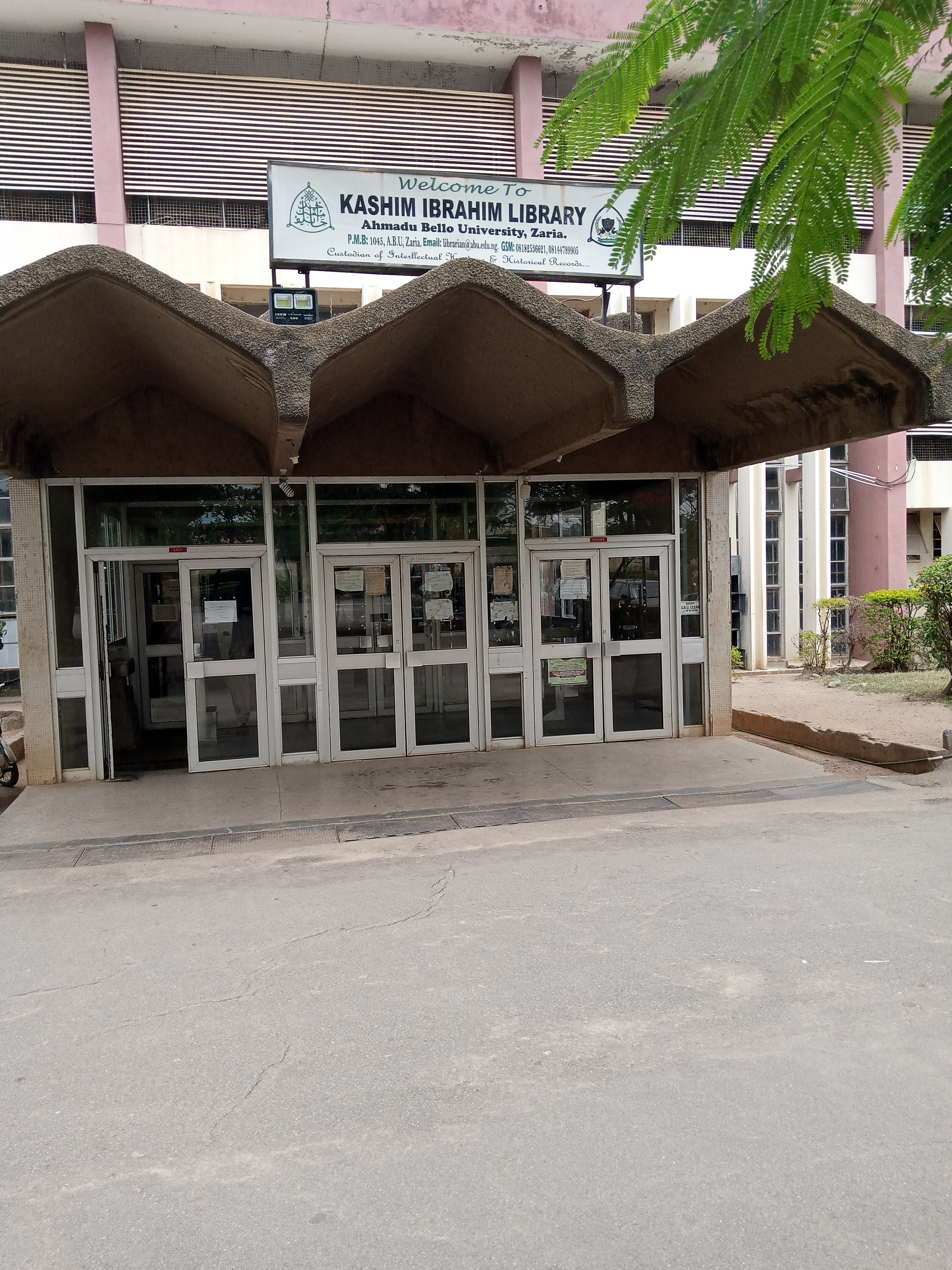
Kashim Ibrahim Library, 2022

The library was established in 1955 comprising a single small room, which was later converted to a staff club. In 1963, a replacement building was constructed for $39,000. It was named for the then state governor.

== A.B.U Zaria Cultural Carnival ==
The ABU Zaria Cultural Carnival is a Yearly important annual celebration of cultural diversity, heritage and identity within Ahmadu Bello University, Zaria. The carnival brings together students, cultural associations, staff, traditional title holders and members of the wider university community to showcase Nigeria’s rich ethnic and cultural traditions through colourful processions, traditional attire, music, dance, horse parades, exhibitions and pageantry. Here is the link to images category https://commons.wikimedia.org/wiki/Category:ABU_Zaria_Cultural_Carnival_2026

== Ranking ==
Ahmadu Bello University Zaria was ranked 6th best among the federal public universities in Nigeria, as of February 2024.

== Admission requirements ==
Any student seeking admission into the school degree program of the school must have at least five credits in mathematics, English studies and any other relevant subjects in WAEC/NECO/SSCE. The applicant must also have a score of at least 180 in Joint Admission Matriculation Board (JAMB) exam.

== Notable alumni ==
The Ahmadu Bello University is notable for producing prominent people and Nigerian leaders, including many former and current state governors and ministers. Amongst the alumni are:

- Ahmed Abdullah, OON, former Agriculture and Rural Development Minister
- Magaji Abdullahi, former national chairman of the National Centre Party of Nigeria (NCPN), former senator, former deputy governor
- Yahaya Abubakar Abdullahi, Senate majority leader of the Nigerian 9th National Assembly
- Alash'le Abimiku, executive director of the International Research Centre of Excellence at the Institute of Human Virology Nigeria
- Atiku Abubakar GCON, former vice president, Federal Republic of Nigeria
- Bashir Abubakar, retired assistant controller general of Customs
- Muhammed K. Abubakar, academic, former minister
- Mohammed Bello Adoke, former Minister of Justice; attorney general of the Federation
- Yonov Frederick Agah, Nigerian diplomat and former deputy director-general of the World Trade Organization.
- Yayale Ahmed, former secretary to the Government of the Federation
- Demas Akpore, politician and academic
- Aisha Alhassan, former minister of women's affairs
- Adamu Aliero, former governor, Kebbi State
- Saratu Iya Aliyu
- Solomon Arase, former IGP, Nigeria Police Force
- Aisha Augie-Kuta, photographer
- Ayodele Awojobi, scientist and professor at University of Lagos
- Sunday Awoniyi, Northern Yoruba leader, former chairman ACF
- Anthony Ayine, auditor general for the Federation
- Hudu Abdullahi Ayuba, political scientist and professor, member of the Department of Political Science and International Studies.
- Ahmed Nuhu Bamalli, current emir of Zazzau and former ambassador to Thailand
- Mohammed Bawa, former Ekiti State governor
- Yahaya Bello, former governor, Kogi state
- Franca Brown, actress
- Maryam Ciroma, former Minister of Women Affairs
- Usman Saidu Nasamu Dakingari, former governor, Kebbi State
- Ibrahim Hassan Dankwambo, former governor, Gombe State
- Lawal Musa Daura, former director general, Nigerian State Security Service
- Oladipo Diya, GCON, former vice president/CGS, Federal Republic of Nigeria
- Ibrahim Hussaini Doko, DG of Raw materials Nigeria
- Donald Duke, former Cross River State governor
- Saddiq Dzukogi, poet and professor of English, Mississippi State University
- Grace Chijimma Ezema, first female electrical engineer in Nigeria
- Afakriya Gadzama, former director general, Nigerian State Security Service
- Ibrahim Gaidam, former governor, Yobe State
- Jerry Gana, former information minister
- Abubakar Ibn Umar Garba, Shehu of Borno
- Ibrahim Garba, former vice chancellor (ABU)
- Kabiru Ibrahim Gaya, former Kano state governor
- Isa Marte Hussaini, professor, pharmacologist
- Bukar Ibrahim, former governor, Yobe State
- Ibrahim Kpotun Idris, former IGP, Nigeria Police Force
- Catherine Uju Ifejika, chairman and CEO, Brittania-U Limited
- Azubuike Ihejirika, former chief of Army Staff
- Attahiru Jega, professor, former chairman, Independent National Electoral Commission
- Zainab Abdulkadir Kure, politician
- Idris Legbo Kutigi, former chief justice of Nigeria
- Shehu Ladan, former group MD, NNPC
- Sanusi Lamido, former governor of Central Bank of Nigeria, 14th & 16th emir of Kano
- Ibrahim Lamorde, former chairman, EFCC
- Balarabe Abbas Lawal — Secretary to the Kaduna State Government and Minister of Environment of Nigeria.
- Rilwanu Lukman, former secretary general OPEC & Petroleum Minister
- Muhammad Nasirudeen Maiturare, professor, former vice chancellor, IBBUL, Niger State
- Ahmed Makarfi, former Kaduna State governor
- Umaru Tanko Al-Makura, former governor, Nasarawa State
- Dino Melaye, senator, Kogi West
- Ahmed Tijjani Mora, pharmacist, president of ABU Alumni Association
- Faruk Imam Muhammad, justice, Kogi state judiciary
- Magaji Muhammed OFR, former Minister of Internal Affairs, former Minister of Industries and former Ambassador to the Kingdom of Saudi Arabia
- Mansur Muhtar, former executive director of the World Bank
- Dahiru Musdapher, former chief justice of Nigeria
- Abdullahi Mustapha, former vice chancellor (ABU)
- Ghali Umar Na'Abba, former speaker, House of Representatives
- Usman Bayero Nafada, former deputy speaker, House of Representatives
- Muhammad Mamman Nami, executive chairman, Federal Inland Revenue Service FIRS
- Rebecca Ndjoze-Ojo, Namibian politician
- Demas Nwoko, artist and architect
- Olufemi Obafemi, poet, playwright, and author
- Samuel Oboh, architect
- Gani Odutokun, artist and educator
- Uche Okeke, artist and educator
- Mike Omotosho, national chairman of the Labour Party (Nigeria)
- Bruce Onobrakpeya, artist
- Samuel Ortom, former Minister of State Trade and Investments
- Jude Rabo, vice-chancellor of Federal University, Wukari
- Nuhu Ribadu, National Security Adviser (Nigeria), former chairman, EFCC
- Nura Abba Rimi, career diplomat, ambassador of Nigeria to Egypt
- Nasir Ahmad el-Rufai, former governor of Kaduna State
- Aminu Safana, doctor/politician
- Namadi Sambo, former vice president of Nigeria
- Faisal Shuaib, medical doctor, executive director and chief executive officer of Nigeria's National Primary Health Care Development Agency
- Ibrahim Shekarau, former Kano state governor
- Ibrahim Shema, former governor, Katsina State
- Abdullahi Aliyu Sumaila, administrator
- Ussif Rashid Sumaila, economist
- Danbaba Suntai, former governor, Taraba State
- Ibrahim Umar, former vice chancellor and scientist
- Lawal Adamu Usman, senator representing Kaduna central
- Nenadi Usman, former finance minister
- Shamsuddeen Usman, former Minister of National Planning
- Auwal H Yadudu, Nigerian academician and Vice-Chancellor of the Federal University, Birnin Kebbi, Kebbi State
- Patrick Yakowa, former governor of Kaduna state
- Andrew Yakubu, former group MD, NNPC
- Turai Yar'Adua, former first lady
- Umaru Musa Yar'Adua, GCFR, former president of Nigeria
- Isa Yuguda, former governor, Bauchi State
- Ibrahim Zakzaky, prominent Shi'ite cleric, founder of Islamic Movement in Nigeria
- Dije Abdu Aboki, jurist and the first female Chief Judge of Kano State.

== Alumni Association ==
Ahmadu Bello University Alumni Association
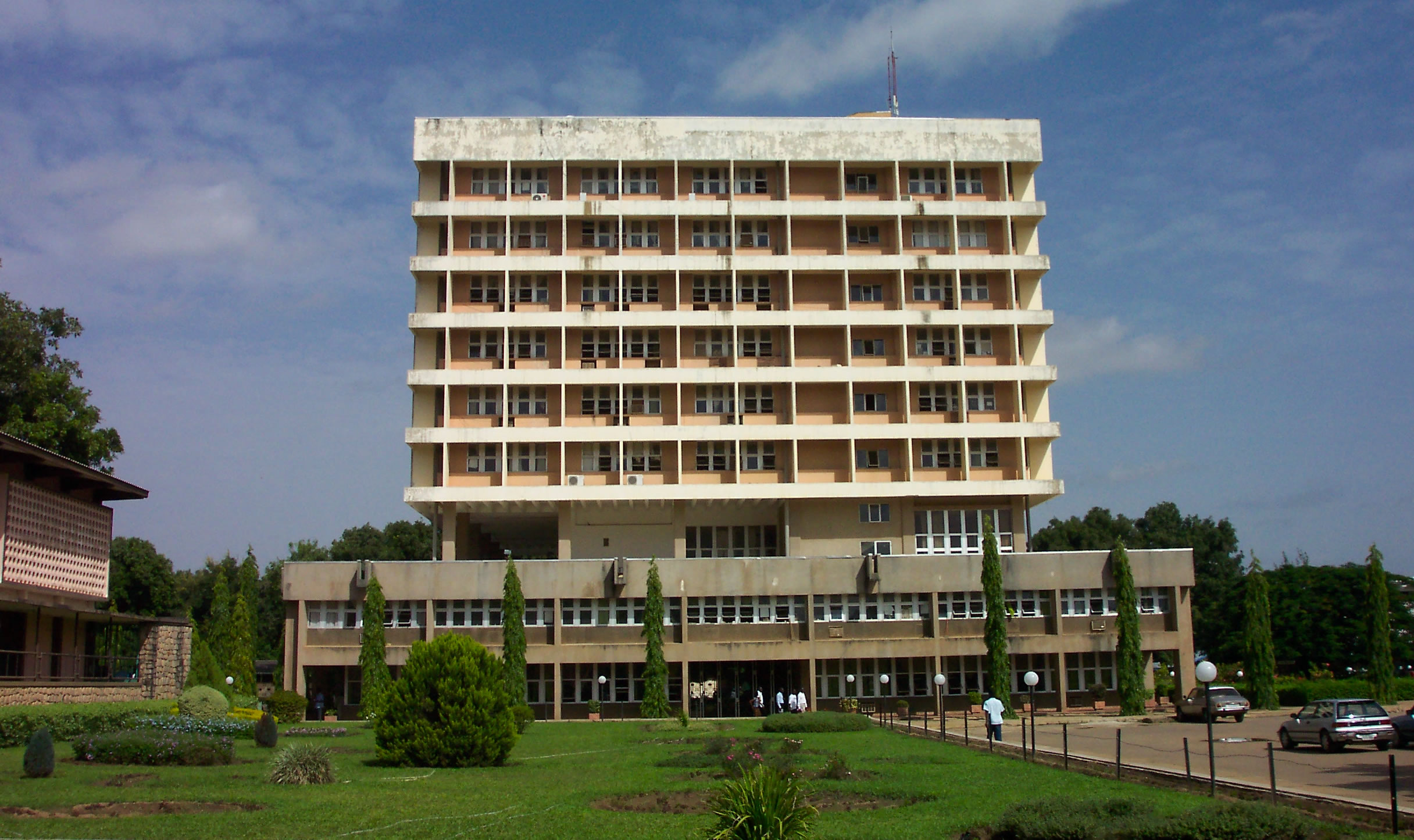
- Established: 1960s
- Affiliations: Ahmadu Bello University
- President: Ahmed Tijani Mora
- Location: Zaria, Kaduna, Nigeria
- Colors: Orange and Blue
- Website: Official website

The Ahmadu Bello University Alumni Association is an alumni organization for former students of the Ahmadu Bello University. It is often represented by the national president of the association in the governing council of the university. This is necessary for the association to have direct input into the university's policies.

The national body of the association currently has 17 National Executive Committee (NEC) members who manage the affairs of the association in alignment with the provisions of the association constitution. The incumbent national president of the alumni association is Ahmed Tijani Mora, a renowned pharmacist and former registrar and chief executive officer of the Pharmacists Council of Nigeria.

=== History ===
The alumni association was founded in the early 1960s by the graduating class which included architect Chief Fola Alade, Chief Lai Balogun and Professor Ayodele Awojobi. Today, the alumni association has branches across the federation with a national office at the university campus itself. Since the inception of the association, the governing council of Ahmadu Bello University has maintained a strong working relationship with the association to develop the university. Initially, the association was under the supervision of the deputy vice-chancellor of the university. Today it is directly under the office of the vice-chancellor and supervised by the vice-chancellor.

== Gallery ==
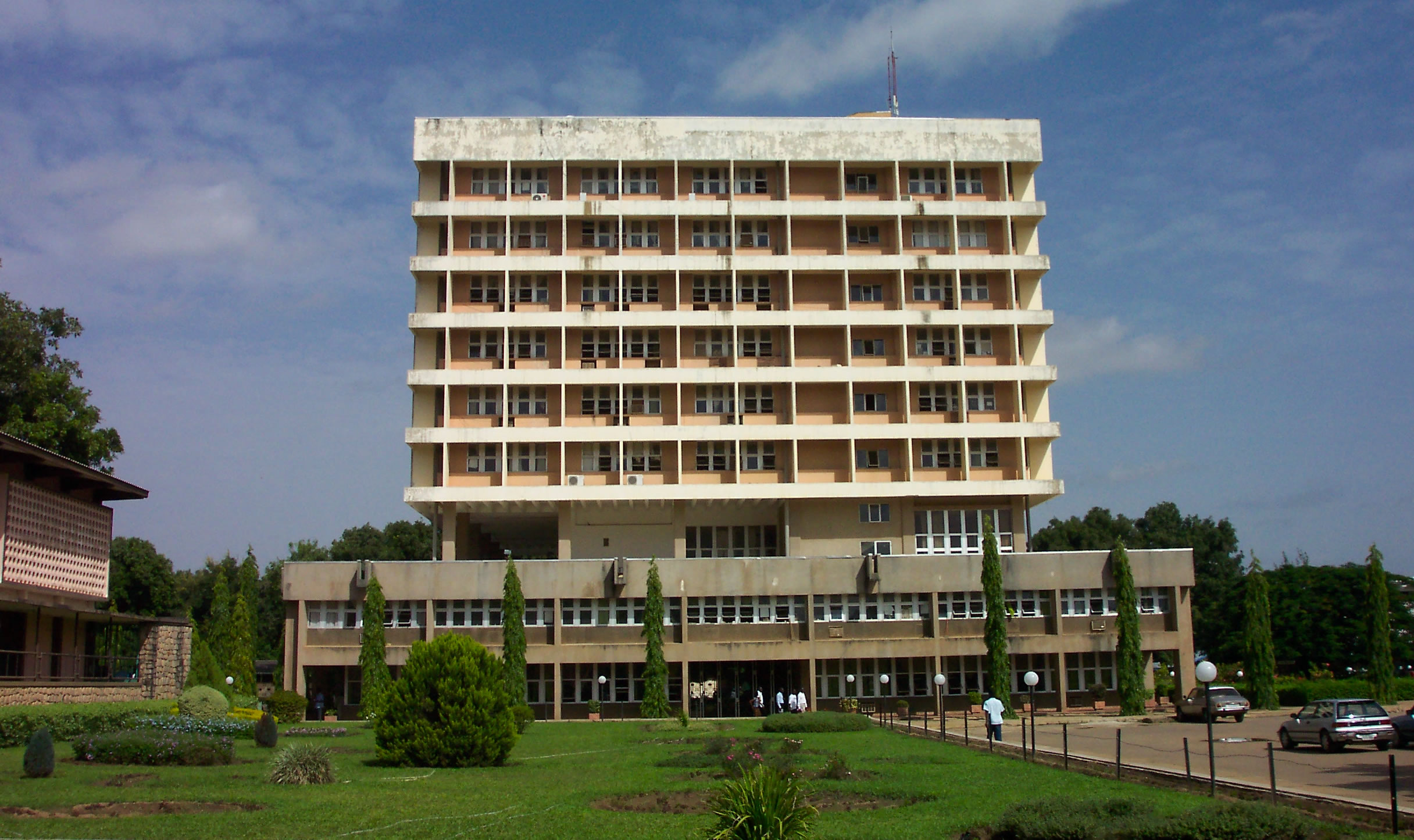
The senate Building of Ahmadu Bello University Zaria

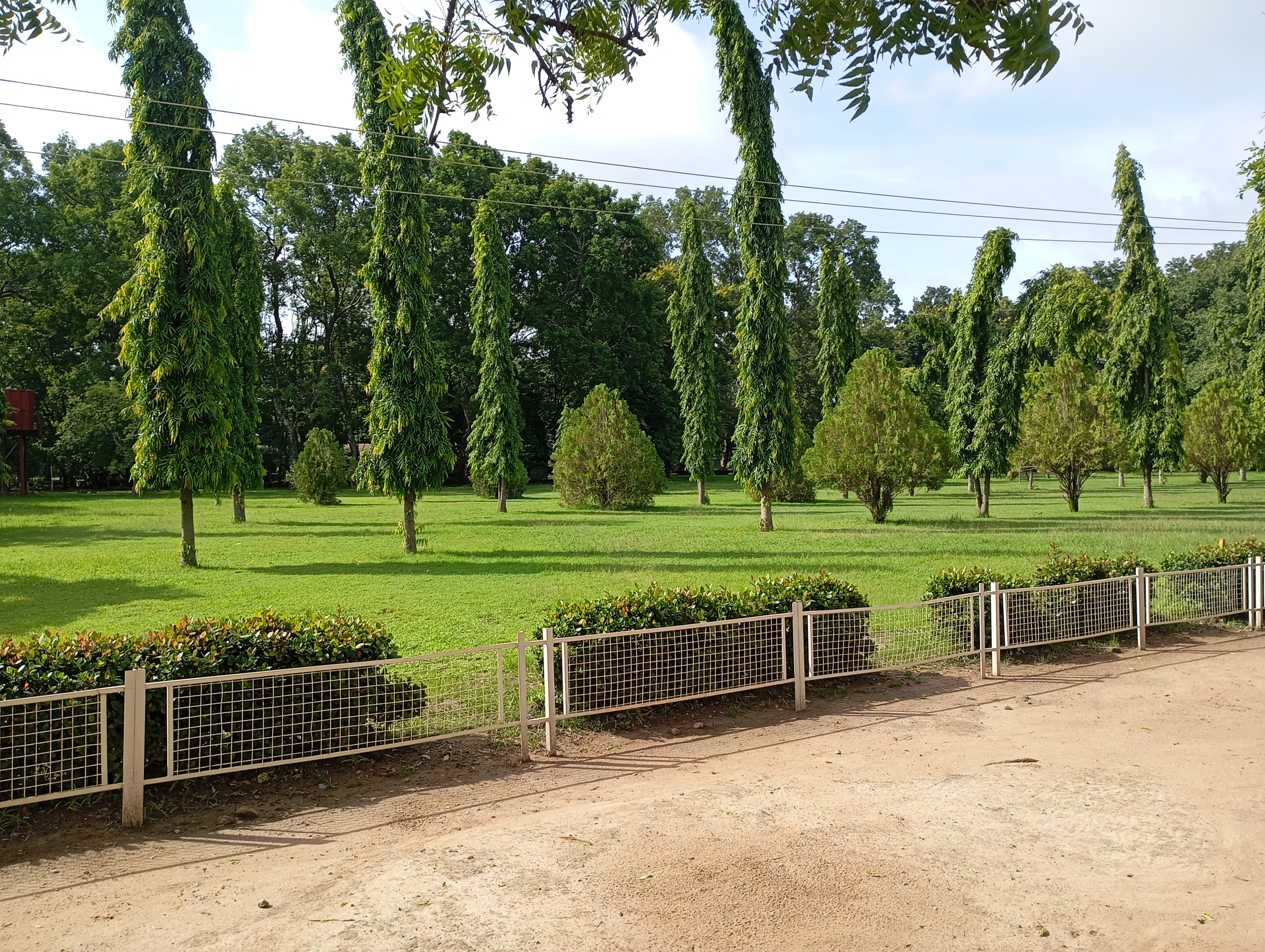
Garden opposite ABU Central Musque Samaru campus

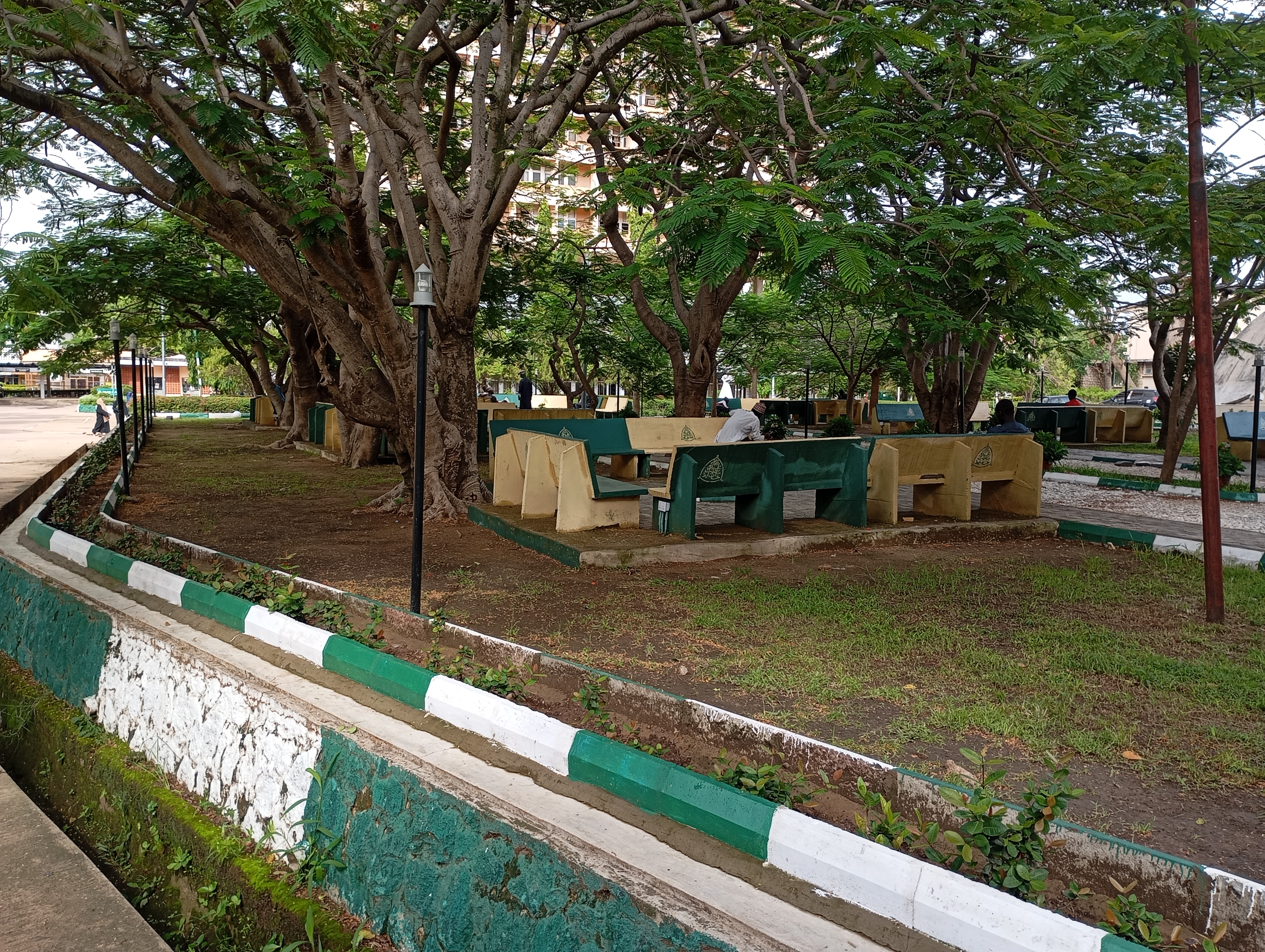
Garden in front of senate building, Samaru campus

== See also ==
- List of universities in Nigeria
- Education in Nigeria
- Academic libraries in Nigeria
