= Farida Jalal (Nigerian actress) =

Nigerian actress

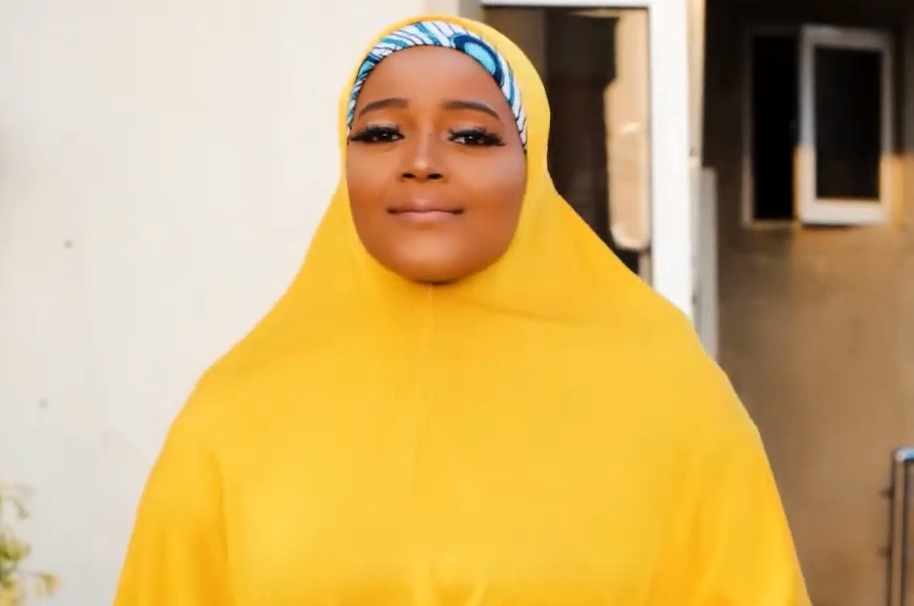
- Born: November 2, 1985 (age 40); Katsina State
- Citizenship: Nigerian
- Occupations: Actress, Business Woman and Islamic Gospel Singer
- Years active: 2002-present
- Children: 1

Farida Jalal is a film actress in the Northern Nigerian film industry known as Kannywood.

== Early life and education ==
Farida Jalal was born on November 2, 1985, in Katsina, Katsina State. Farida grew up and studied in her home state of Katsina before she later moved to Kano State and started her career in the film industry at the Kannywood Hausa film industry.

== Career ==
Farida entered the film industry in 2002 where she appeared in major industry films of the time such as Yakana, Sansani and Madadi. Actress Farida Jalal has been banned from filming for some time due to the banning of some film actress from filming by Kano State government. In 2019, Farida appeared in Kannywood again. At that time, she announced that she was back in the film industry and even announced that she would be releasing her films soon. In an interview with BBC Hausa, Farida revealed that she's still being exploited in the Kannywood industry. In an interview, actress Farida Jalal stated that she is currently focusing on Islamic Gospel Musics.

Farida Jalalwas asked in an interview (What are you doing presently?) and she said

This is something I can’t make any comment on for now. As I have said earlier, I have given my share of positive contribution to the development of the industry as an actress and I am not in a position to determine what tomorrow may look like. Therefore, returning or not returning should be something that only time will tell and not me.

— Daily Trust, Why I ventured into Islamic gospel – Farida Jalal, 2021-09-11

== Personal life ==
Farida was married and had two children, but one of her children died. Farida is currently single.
