= Nigerian Enterprises Promotion Decree =

The Nigerian Enterprises Promotion Decree or NEPD 1972 as amended in 1977 was meant to effect changes in the ownership structure of businesses in Nigeria and to provide opportunity for indigenous capital to have assertive control of the economy. The law also restricted economic activities of foreign firms to certain areas and obliged the firms to add Nigerians as partners. Up to 1,130 companies were affected, some companies transferred equity through private placement while others listed on the stock exchange. A total of 81 companies listed shares on the stock exchange worth a total value of 210 million naira while majority offered the shares through private placement.

The decree was repealed in 1995 with the promulgation of the Nigerian Investment Promotion Act.

== Background ==
Prior to the end of colonial rule in 1960, Nigerian businessmen had been agitating for protection of indigenous capital from foreign competition, while a clamour to reduce expatriate quota resulted in Nigerianisation in many institutions. Following decolonization, aspirations of economic independence and self-determination became pronounced and began to earn broad base support. An indigenisation policy championed by bureaucrats and Nigerian businessmen was pursued within the Federal Government's National Development Plan for 1970–74. In February 1972, the Nigerian Enterprises Promotion Decree was promulgated to be effective in April 1974. The new legislation was planned to give Nigerians more access to surplus income of businesses, shift foreign investment to highly technical areas and promote indigenous businesses.

The military administration was more amenable to make the changes than their previous democratic counterpart partly because of their increasing distrust of foreign capital, an aftermath of their experience in relying on foreign governments and multinational corporations during the Nigerian Civil War and the lack of prompt response of oil companies to make payments exclusively to the Federal Government.

== NEPC 1972 ==
NEPC decree of 1972 was a legislation to effect changes in the ownership structure of light industries such as retail and small scale businesses. Industries were divided into two divisions called schedule 1 and schedule 2. Along with the decree was the establishment of the Nigerian Enterprises Promotion Board to manage the implementation of the new law. Following the spirit of the new law, the government acquired interest in major expatriate led banks within the country including First Bank of Nigeria and Union Bank of Nigeria and mandated a compulsory percentage of loans be made to Nigerians. The government also acquired interest in the insurance and oil and gas sectors. A new bank, the Nigerian bank of Commerce and Industry came into existence to facilitate loans to Nigerians for the purpose of investing in foreign owned firms.

=== Schedules and enterprises ===
Schedule	% owned by Nigerians	Some business activities affected
1	100%	PR, advertising, pool, haulage of goods by road, block and brick making, bakeries, laundry, cinema, newspaper publishing and printing
2	40%	brewing of beer, soft drinks bottling, cosmetic manufacture, boat building, department stores and supermarkets, manufacture of bicycles, cement, matches, metal containers and soap.

== NEPC 1977 ==
Prior to 1977, criticism of the existing law led to a couple of amendments but the most significant was in 1977. Critics had felt the changes created a new bourgeois that purchased majority of the shares. In addition, while 950 business were affected under the 1972 decree some had requested exemptions and not all were compliant by April 1974. Some affected enterprises were alleged to have conspired with some Nigerians who will come in as a silent partner or front as chairman of the board of directors but the firm will be managed by line personnel expatriates in the backroom. The new amendment of 1977 limited the number of companies an individual could gain majority control and empowered the enterprises promotion board with the ability to seal the offices of non compliant firms. Businesses where divided into three schedules. Under schedule one, ownership of businesses shall be 100% indigenous. Business activities under this schedule were related to the retail and service sector, advertising, bakeries, commercial transportation and estate agencies. Under schedule two, ownership will be 60% owned by Nigerians. Under the amendment additional sectors were added to schedule 2, this included banking, insurance, food processing, petrochemicals and iron and steel.

=== Schedules and enterprises ===
Schedule	% owned by Nigerians	Some business activities
1	100%	Laundries, estate management, retailing, advertising and bakeries.
2	60%	Sale and distribution of technical goods and motor vehicles, banking, insurance, construction, manufacturing of rubber, paints, plastics and most industries
3	40%	highly technical industry, drug manufacturing, turbine manufacturing
