= Alash'le Abimiku =

Nigerian epidemiologist

- Born: Alash'le Grace Abimku; Nigeria
- Education: Ahmadu Bello University; London School of Hygiene & Tropical Medicine (PhD)
- Known for: Retrovirology
- Scientific career
- Workplaces: University of Maryland School of Medicine; Institute of Human Virology Nigeria
- Thesis: Protection against Campylobacter jejuni infection (1988)
- Website: www.medschool.umaryland.edu/profiles/Abimiku-Alashle/

Alash'le Grace Abimiku is a Nigerian executive director of the International Research Centre of Excellence at the Institute of Human Virology Nigeria and a professor of virology at the University of Maryland School of Medicine who takes interest in the prevention and treatment of HIV.

== Early life and education ==
Abimiku was born in Nigeria. She studied microbiology at Ahmadu Bello University. She moved to the London School of Hygiene & Tropical Medicine for her graduate studies, earning a master's degree in 1983 and a PhD in 1998. Here she specialised in retrovirology and protection against infection caused by the bacteria Campylobacter jejuni.

== Research and career ==
After earning her doctorate, Abimiku worked as postdoctoral researcher with Robert Gallo at the National Cancer Institute, where she developed collaborations between scientists in her home country of Nigeria and researchers at the University of Maryland School of Medicine.

She was one the founders that helped in the establishment of the IHVN Campus project in 2004 with IHVN partnering with the Institute of Human Virology at the University of Maryland School of Medicine in the United States.

Gallo and Abimiku opened the International Center for Scientific Culture—World Laboratory AIDS Research Center in Jos. Whilst Abimiku had planned to isolate a particular strain of HIV, she found she had to concentrate on basic screening and community education. Eventually, she studied the HIV strain that is prevalent in Nigeria; identifying that it was the non-B subtype related to the HIV subtype G. Abimiku called for African strains to be included in AIDS Vaccine studies. In 2004 she helped to establish a partnership with Nigeria using funding from the President's Emergency Plan for AIDS Relief (PEPFAR). Abimiku studies the role of HIV in disease pathogenesis and the effects of tuberculosis (TB) and HIV co-infection. She has considered the molecular epidemiology and evolution of subtypes and resistance of HIV, the development of cohorts for HIV epidemiological studies and the epidemiology of selected viruses.

People in Nigeria are most likely to suffer more from this TB and HIV in the world, which makes them more likely to suffer from multi-drug-resistant tuberculosis (MDR-TB), an airborne disease. In 2010 Abimiku and the Institute of Human Virology Nigeria opened a Biosafety Level-3 laboratory, the first of its kind in Africa, to research the prevalence of MDR-TB. The laboratory, which is containerised with pre-filters to withstand the dry and dusty winds can also assess for extremely drug-resistant TB (XDRTB). It includes a negatively pressurised laboratory that allows for the handling of infectious agents. This laboratory supported the UNAIDS 90-90-90 targets and early diagnosis.

In 2012 Abimiku developed an International Society for Biological and Environmental Repositories (IBSER) repository that can process and store biological samples. The repository was supported by the National Institutes of Health Human Heredity and Health in Africa (H3 Africa) program, which was initiated by Charles Rotimi.

She has been involved with the PEPFAR transition to a situation where local governments and indigenous organisations are responsible for caring for d individuals. The Institute of Human Virology Nigeria is acting to support the move toward local ownership. In 2018 she co-founded the International Research Centre of Excellence located in the Institute of Human Virology Nigeria. The centre will focus on building the capacity of African scientists as well as supporting research that affects the country.

=== Academic service ===
Abimiku is a member of the advisory group of the University of Cape Town and the World Health Organization Research and Development Blueprint. She served as the chair of the board of the African Society of Laboratory Medicine, as well as a member of the board of the Nigerian Institute of Medical Research. She previously served on the World Health Organization HIV vaccine advisory committee and AIDS Vaccine program. She serves on the Wellcome Trust Longitudinal Population Studies Committee.

=== Selected publications ===
Her publications include;

- Laboratory diagnosis of tuberculosis in resource-poor countries: challenges and opportunities
- Patient Retention and Adherence to Antiretrovirals in a Large Antiretroviral Therapy Program in Nigeria: A Longitudinal Analysis for Risk Factors
- Update on HIV-1 diversity in Africa: a decade in review
