= Dije Abdu Aboki =

Nigerian jurist

- Born: Kano state
- Citizenship: Nigeria
- Education: Ahmadu Bello University, Zaria
- Occupation: Lawyer
- Spouse: Hon. Justice Abdu Aboki,

Dije Abdu Aboki (born 10 July 1964) is a Nigerian jurist and the first female Chief Judge of Kano State.

== Early life ==
She was born in Kano state. She finished her secondary school at Government Girls College in Minna, Niger State, from 1973 to 1978 after attending Tudun Wada Primary School in Kano from 1969 to 1973.

== Educational ==
In 1983, she graduated with a Bachelor of Laws (LL.B.) from Ahmadu Bello University in Zaria. In 1984, she was call to the Nigerian Bar after attending the Nigerian Law Schools in Lagos. Between 1984 and 1985, she finished her mandatory National Youth Service Corps (NYSC) program at Bayero University in Kano.

== Career ==
In 1985, Aboki started working for the Kano State Ministry of Justice as a State Counsel. She began serving as a magistrate in 1986 and advanced through the legal system to become a chief magistrate in 1992. In 2006, she was appointed as a judge of the Kano State High Court. After Justice Nura Sagir retired in March 2023, she was named Acting Chief Judge of Kano State by former Governor Abdullahi Umar Ganduje. On 6 July 2023, the Kano State House of Assembly confirmed her appointment. She became the first female jurist, to lead Kano State's judiciary when Governor Abba Kabir Yusuf swore her in as the substantive Chief Judge on 7 August 2023.

== Leadership/Membership ==
- International Federation of Women lawyers (FIDA) Kano state chapter. chairperson (1990–1992)
- International Federation of Women lawyers (FIDA) Treasurer
- Nigerian Bar Association (NBA),
- International Bar Association (IBA)
- Magistrates Association of Nigeria.
- International Association of Women Judges.

== Personal life ==
She is married to Hon. Justice Abdu Aboki, a retired Justice of the Supreme Court of Nigeria.
