= Autonov 1 =

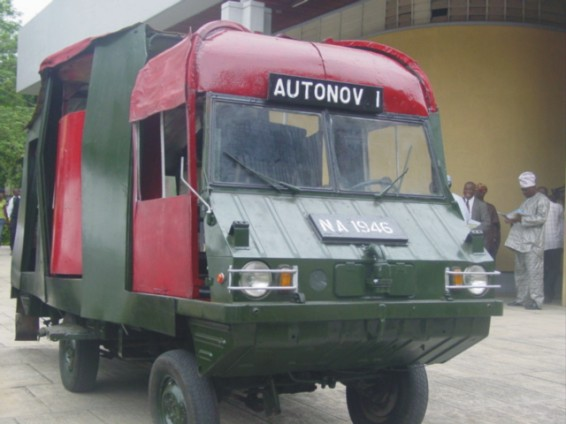
Autonov 1 on display during "Engineering week" at the Faculty of Engineering, University of Lagos, Nigeria

Autonov 1 is the name given to the automobile novelty that was created sometime in the 1970s, by making a once regular motor vehicle engine able to run in both the forward and backward directions, utilizing all four pre-existing gears in whichever direction. A second steering wheel was introduced at the back, with a central revolving chair to effect the driver's switch-over position.

== Purpose of design ==
Its inventor, the late engineering professor Ayodele Awojobi, imagined the advantage of the invention in such a situation as when a motor vehicle drives forward into a cul-de-sac and needs to make a fast, backward retreat. Emergency evacuation procedures or war-time situations exemplify this.

== Patent and specification ==
A patent for the invention was never obtained before the untimely death of the inventor. The innovation utilized an abandoned Layland jeep as its base, which remains on display at the Faculty of Engineering, University of Lagos during the annual "Engineering Week." Essentially, the modification involves integrating a second steering wheel at the rear end of the jeep, connected to the axle. Additionally, a gear-shift mechanism was installed, linking to the existing four gears, enabling the vehicle to be driven in both forward and reverse directions. The central compartment of the jeep underwent redesigning, incorporating a rotating floor mechanism allowing occupants to swivel between the rear and front seats seamlessly.

Short of dismantling it piece-meal, the detailed knowledge of the designed mechanism is unknown as no drawings or design sketches are known to exist.
