= Catherine Uju Ifejika =

Nigerian lawyer (born 1959)

- Born: October 28, 1959 (age 66); Opobo, Rivers State, Nigeria
- Education: Ahmadu Bello University
- Occupations: Lawyer, Business executive
- Known for: First Nigerian woman to head an indigenous oil firm with a producing marginal field
- Title: Chairperson/CEO of Brittania-U Nigeria Limited
- Spouse: Emmanuel Ifejika
- Children: 6
- Awards: African Businesswoman Award (2013)

External videos
- "View From The Top: Uju Ifejika Shares Experience In The Oil And Gas Sector -- Pt 1", 9 September 2015, Channels Television

Catherine Uju Ifejika // (born 28 October 1959) is a Nigerian lawyer and Chairperson/CEO of Brittania-U Nigeria Limited (BUNL); an indigenous petroleum company for upstream exploration and production, and Brittania-U Ghana Limited (BUGL). She is believed to be one of the six most powerful women in oil and gas in the world and one of the richest women in Africa. She has received both national and international awards for best practices in business leadership.

== Early life ==
Catherine Uju Ifejika was born on 28 October 1959 in Opobo in Rivers State to Chief Clifford Ogwu and Elizabeth Ikpeze of Ogidi, Present Day Anambra State. She obtained her basic education at University Primary School, Nsukka and her secondary education at Queens School, Enugu, among others.

Uju Ifejika graduated from Ahmadu Bello University, Zaria with a Diploma in Law and an LLB (Hons.) in 1985. She was called to the Nigerian Bar in 1986. In addition to being a member of the Nigerian Bar Association, she is a member of the Institute of Chartered Secretaries and Administrators of Nigeria (ICSAN) and a fellow of the Institute of Arbitration and Conciliation.

== Career ==
Catherine Uju Ifejika served a required year in the National Youth Service Corps at Texaco and went on to work in the oil and gas industry for Texaco and Chevron. She joined Texaco as a Junior Counsel in 1987, spent two years at Texaco Overseas Petroleum Unlimited from 1988 to 1989, and was Acting Chief Counsel by 1991. This gave her experience in both the upstream and downstream aspects of the petroleum industry. By 1997, she was the Company Secretary and the Manager of Public and Government Affairs. As of 2003, she became Company Secretary for Public and Government Affairs for West Africa, a position in which she deal with Cameroon, Togo, Benin, Côte d'Ivoire, and the Democratic Republic of Congo. She served on the board of directors of the Federal Ministry of Arts and Culture of Nigeria from 2001 to 2002.

In 2007, Uju Ifejika became the Chairperson/CEO of Brittania-U Nigeria Limited, a Nigeria-based affiliate of the oil and gas company Brittania-U Group. the company was registered on 15 December 1995 according to the Nigerian Company and Allied Matters Act but did not become active until 2003. Brittania-U Nigeria bought a stake in the Ajapa Marginal Field, an oil and gas field which is believed to have reserves worth $4.3bn. They took advantage of a government initiative for the development of marginal fields, and raised money through local investors. In additional to Brittania-U Nigeria, Uju Ifejika has established Data Appraisal Co. Ltd. (2001), Nexttee Oil & Gas Trading Co. Nigeria Ltd. (2009), and Brittania-U Ghana Limited (2010).

As an indigenous company, Brittania-U Nigeria has partnered with local Nigerian communities, hiring locals, and engaging in community-development programs. Uju Ifejika has stated that Brittania-U's main objectives include people's well-being, better quality of life, job opportunities, and a safe and clean environment.

Uju Ifejika has received a number of awards and honors including the 2013 African Businesswoman Award from Black Pumps, a non-profit women's organization based in Los Angeles, California.

== Personal life ==
Catherine Uju Ifejika is married to Emmanuel Ifejika and is a mother of six children
