= Kano State Police Command =

State police command in Nigeria

- Abbreviation: KSP
- Motto: Police is your friend

Jurisdictional structure
- Operations jurisdiction: Kano, NG
- Area: 20,131 square kilometres (7,773 sq mi) 11°30′N 8°30′E
- Population: 15,076,892 (2006 est.)
- Governing body: Government of Kano State
- General nature: Civilian police

Operational structure
- Headquarters: Bompai, Nassarawa, Kano State
- Agency executive: Ibrahim Adamu Bakori, Commissioner

Facilities
- Stations: 40

Website
- www.npf.rv.gov.ng

The Kano State Police Command is a law enforcement agency responsible for maintaining peace and security in Kano State, Nigeria. Like other state police commands in Nigeria, it is part of the Nigerian Police Force and operates at the state level. The commissioner of the command Ibrahim Adamu Bakori is appointed by the Inspector General of Police Kayode Egbetokun as the 46th commissioner. Kano State Police operates under the Nigerian Police Act & Regulations CAP. P19. LFN 2004.

== Leadership ==
- Commissioner of Police: Ibrahim Adamu Bakori
- Deputy Commissioner of Police (Finance & Administration)
- Deputy Commissioner of Police (Operations)
- Deputy Commissioner of Police (Investigations)
- Assistant Commissioner of Police (Administration)
- Assistant Commissioner of Police (Operations)
- Assistant Commissioner of Police (Investigations)
- Area Commanders

== Commissioners of Police ==
- Muhammed Usaini Gumel (March 2023 - 2025)
- Ibrahim Adamu Bakori (2025 - Present)
