= Faruk Imam Muhammad =

Nigerian judge

Faruk Imam

Judge
- Incumbent
- Assumed office 29 August 1988

Personal details
- Born: 15 July 1942 Ankpa, Kogi State, Nigeria
- Spouse: Hajiya Faruk

Justice Faruk Imam Muhammad (born 15 July 1942 in Bida, Nigeria) was a judge at the Kogi State Judiciary from January 1990 to 2007. Prior to this appointment, he was a lecturer at Ahmadu Bello University Zaria, from January 1975 to September 1988. He also worked with the Kwara State Judiciary, from June 1989 to January 1990.

== Early life ==
He was born a member of the Imam clan in Ankpa, a local government area in the north of kogi state.

The progenitor of the clan (his lordship's father), Alhaji Muhammad imam, was an Arabic scholar, a renowned and respected Islamic jurist and teacher who migrated from the Bida Emirate in the mid-1900s and pursued a lifelong mission of teaching and Islamic missionary work. The father settled in Ankpa Town, in Kogi State.

Faruk's guardian, Sheikh Yusuf Abdallah – also a renowned Islamic scholar – served as a principal advisor to several District Heads across the Kogi Native Authority during the colonial era, for decades Mallam faruk teacher was the founder Arabic and Islamic Studies Centres (Mash'had then Ma'ahad) was a novel idea. The Studies in Islamic and Western Educations combined in a formal system was hitherto unknown to the area . He died in 2009 as the head of a large and respected family leaving behind over 15 children, 40 grandchildren and great-grandchildren. My Lord Justice faruk is the head of this family.

== Notes ==
The circumstance under which my lord was enrolled in school is quite interesting. Sometime in early 90s my lord lost his father he was just 7years old. his late father who had four wife's had lot of children but my lord mother was the last of the four wife's and had just one child. my lord learned Arabic before the death of his father. based on family traditions to further his Islamic education as was the practice in those days. However, an elder brother opined that he was too young to withstand the rigours of long-distance travel and insisted that he be left at home until the following year. He spent only two years in the elementary school before moving to the middle where the teachers were convinced that the young lad must have been memorizing the dictionary as his vocabulary was clearly beyond the norm! He was a voracious reader that devoured everything that came his way

True to family tradition, his exposure to western education did not deflect him from his Islamic education. Through the traditional system, he mastered a good portion of the Holy Qur'an and acquired intensive knowledge in Arabic Language and grammar; as well as the foundational principles of Islamic law. The knowledge garnered gave him invaluable insight when adjudicating on issues related to the Shari'ah and is generally regarded as an authority and reference point on the subject.

He speaks fluent Arabic.

A few interesting fact about His Lordship.

- a. A very quick reader. He can read vast amounts of text very quickly with unbelievable understanding.
- b. He believes in routines and has perfected a simple routine that he has stuck to for over 35 years. Those who have been close to him over the years can tell exactly what he is doing at every point of the day.
- c. My Lord learned how to drive even though he was entitled to a driver he prefer he drive himself
- d. he his devoted Muslim and of the tijaniya sect

=== Hobbies ===
- Reading, quran and crosswords
- Travelled extensively throughout the world

== See also ==
- List of jurists
- List of Nigerians
