= Kabiru Bala =

Nigerian academic (born 1964)

- Born: 7 January 1964 (age 62)
- Occupations: Academic; professor
- Predecessor: Ibrahim Garba
- Successor: Adamu Ahmed

Academic background
- Education: Professor of Building
- Alma mater: Ahmadu Bello University

Kabiru Bala (born 7 January 1964) is a Nigerian professor, academic, construction engineer and the former vice chancellor of Ahmadu Bello University Zaria.

== Early life and education ==
Born on 7 January 1964, Kabiru Bala was educated at Barewa College, Zaria before proceeding to Ahmadu Bello University where he bagged a bachelor's degree in building engineering and technology in 1985. He obtained his master's degree and PhD in the same institution. He has written 80 publications and has attended many international conferences.

== Career ==
Bala is the former vice-chancellor of Ahmadu Bello University, Zaria, having held numerous positions previously within the university. He was succeeded by Prof. Adamu Ahmed.
