= Ayodele Awojobi =

Nigerian academic (1937–1984)

- Born: 12 March 1937; Oshodi, Lagos State, Nigeria
- Died: 23 September 1984 (aged 47)
- Education: Nigerian College of Arts, Science and Technology, Ibadan.
- Occupations: Mechanical engineer, social activist, author, academic

Ayodele Oluwatumininu Awojobi (12 March 1937 – 23 September 1984), also known by the nicknames "Dead Easy", "The Akoka Giant", and "Macbeth", was a Nigerian academic, author, inventor, social crusader and activist. He was considered a scholarly genius by his teachers and peers alike.

His research papers, particularly in the field of vibration, are still cited by international research fellows in Engineering as lately as the year 2020, and are archived by such publishers as the Royal Society.

== Early life ==
Born in Oshodi, Lagos State, Awojobi's father, Chief Daniel Adekoya Awojobi, was a stationmaster at the Nigerian Railway Corporation who hailed from Ikorodu in Lagos State. His mother, Comfort Bamidele Awojobi (née Adetunji), was a petty trader who hailed from Modakeke, Ile-Ife, Osun State. Between 1942 and 1947, he attended St. Peter's Primary School, Faji, Lagos.

It was while at his secondary school, the CMS Grammar School, Lagos, that his academic traits began to manifest. Not only was he seen to be gifted in mathematics and the sciences, he was comfortable also in the arts, becoming a member of the school's literary and debating society. It was during this period that he earned the nickname, "Macbeth": William Shakespeare's famous play, Macbeth, was to be staged in the school. The lead actor took ill a week before, and so Ayodele was called upon to play the lead role in his stead. It is said that not only did Ayodele master his lines as lead actor, but also the entire play, such that he was able to prompt the cast whenever they forgot their lines.

== Academic achievements ==
Ayodele Oluwatumininu Awojobi was a straight-A's secondary school student, while at the CMS Grammar school, passing his West African School Certificate examinations with a record eight distinctions in 1955. He proceeded to the Nigerian College of Arts, Science and Technology, Ibadan, for his General Certificate of Examinations, GCE (Advanced Level), where in 1958 he sat for, and obtained distinctions in all his papers: Physics, Pure Mathematics and Applied Mathematics. In 1962 Awojobi was awarded his first degree in mechanical engineering – a BSc (Eng) London, with first class honours, at the then Nigerian College of Arts, Science and Technology, Zaria (now Ahmadu Bello University, Zaria). He had studied there on a federal government scholarship won on the merit of his performance in the GCE (Advanced-level) examinations of 1958.

It was said by Akintola Ajai (himself an engineering graduate of the University of London), that when Awojobi arrived at the Nigerian College of Arts, Science and Technology, Zaria, he boasted openly saying that it was his intention to finish the whole course within a period of three years only; an impracticable feat due to the fact that nowhere was the BSc Mechanical Engineering curriculum designed to run less than four years. Ayodele accomplished it in three years just as he had predicted.

The federal government awarded Awojobi another scholarship in 1962 to study further at the post-graduate level in the field of Mechanical Engineering at the Imperial College of the University of London (now Imperial College London). He completed the course, successfully defending his thesis, and was awarded a PhD in mechanical engineering in 1966.

=== Landmark degree award ===
After a period teaching at the University of Lagos, he returned to the Imperial College London for a research study in the field of Vibration, and was awarded the degree of Doctor of Science, DSc. He was the first African to be awarded the Doctor of Science degree in mechanical engineering, at the Imperial College London.

The first university to admit an individual to this degree was the University of London in 1860.

== Educator ==
On his return from England in 1966 Awojobi enrolled as a lecturer in the Faculty of Engineering, University of Lagos, Akoka. His teaching methods endeared him to his engineering students, whose public chants: "Dead easy... Dead easy...", would often be heard shouted in his direction as he went along the campus grounds. He quickly rose in the ranks among his colleagues and would later become the head of department, Mechanical Engineering, University of Lagos.

Awojobi went back to London to study for his doctorate. He returned in 1974 and was made an associate professor in mechanical engineering at the University of Lagos. However, one week after having been appointed associate professor, the University of Lagos Senate, after receiving news that Awojobi had just been awarded the degree of Doctor of Science (DSc), immediately appointed him professor in mechanical engineering, making him the youngest professor in the Faculty of Engineering, University of Lagos and the first ever to be expressly promoted from associate to full professorship within a week.

By nature, Ayodele Awojobi was a teacher. He imparted knowledge at various other levels, even as he contended with his day job as a full-time professor and university lecturer. He envisaged his country as a whole becoming more advanced, technologically – this was exemplified when he refused lucrative offers from commercial outfits for his Autonov 1 invention, he rather preferring to preserve his design for his country's future benefit.

He engaged with great educators of his, and earlier generations, such as the late nationalist and Yoruba leader, Obafemi Awolowo (who forwarded several of Ayodele's educational books), the late activist, social crusader and educator, Tai Solarin, and the once Lagos State governor, Lateef Kayode Jakande, who achieved free education at all educational levels in Lagos State, Nigeria. Jakande believed in Awolowo's visionary ideas about the way forward for the nation, particularly in Awolowo's resounding theme of qualitative and quantitative education across the nation, free of overbearing school fees.

Ayodele Awojobi became, at one time, the chairman, Lagos State School's management board, out of his concern for ways to better improve the problems inherent in secondary school education in Lagos State, Nigeria. He desired that all his children go to public schools. The older ones all did. Such was his vision and hope that the country would some day attain equitable distribution in the quality of education cutting across different social strata. He authored several books for both the secondary and tertiary levels of education in Nigeria.

His natural propensity to inform, to educate, drove him to become, in the early 1970s, a quiz-master on national television. The quiz-show, Mastermind, consisted of weekly contestants taking turns in isolation on "the hot-seat", whereupon various categories of questions would be thrown at them. Otunba Gbenga Daniel, former governor of Ogun State, Nigeria, was a returning winner and champion on Mastermind for several episodes over; he being in his undergraduate years at the time.

== Inventor ==
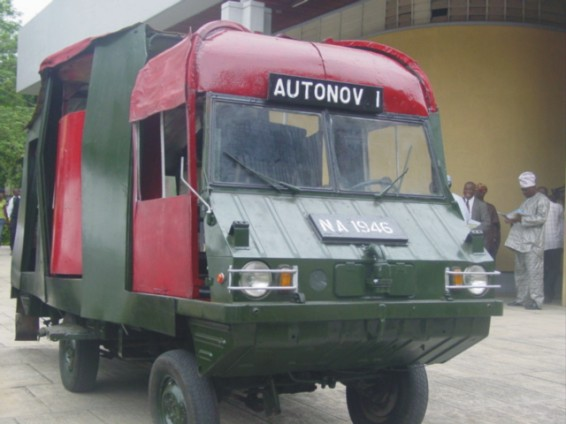
Autonov 1 on display at the Faculty of Engineering, University of Lagos.

While as a lecturer at the University of Lagos, Awojobi successfully converted his own family car, an Opel Olympia Rekord, from a right-hand drive to a left-hand drive.

He tinkered further with motor engines when he acquired an army-type jeep and proceeded to invent a second steering-wheel mechanism adjoined to the pre-existing engine at the rear end so that the vehicle could move forward and backwards with all four pre-existing gears. This gave the hybrid vehicle, which he christened Autonov 1, the ability to achieve its highest speeds at a moment's notice, in the normal reverse direction. He highlighted the advantage this might offer to army vehicles, as an example, that might need to make a fast retreat, in a cul-de-sac or ambush situation.

== Activist ==
Ayodele Awojobi, in the wake of the presidential election results that returned the incumbent, Shehu Shagari as president in the Second Nigerian Republic, became very vocal in the national newspapers and magazines, going as far as suing the Federal Government of Nigeria for what he strongly believed was a widespread election rigging. With all his court cases against the Nigerian government thrown out of court, he delved into the law books, himself being only a mechanical engineer, claiming that he would earn his law degrees in record time, to enable him better argue with the opposition at the federal courts. He used the universities as a bastion, going from campus to campus to make speeches at student-rallies, hoping to sensitise them to what he perceived as the ills of a corrupt government. Ayodele Awojobi authored several political books over the course of his ideological struggles against a perceived, corrupt federal government. These books were usually made available during his public rallies or symposiums.

== Political ambition ==
Any intention Ayodele Awojobi ever had of entering partisan politics, was revealed by the man himself when he spoke on national television, saying: "At the age of 65, I will have built the infrastructure. There would be very few illiterates in Nigeria when I mount the soapbox. Then, I will go into proper politics". However this ambition was never realised as he died at the age of 47 in 1984.

== Death ==
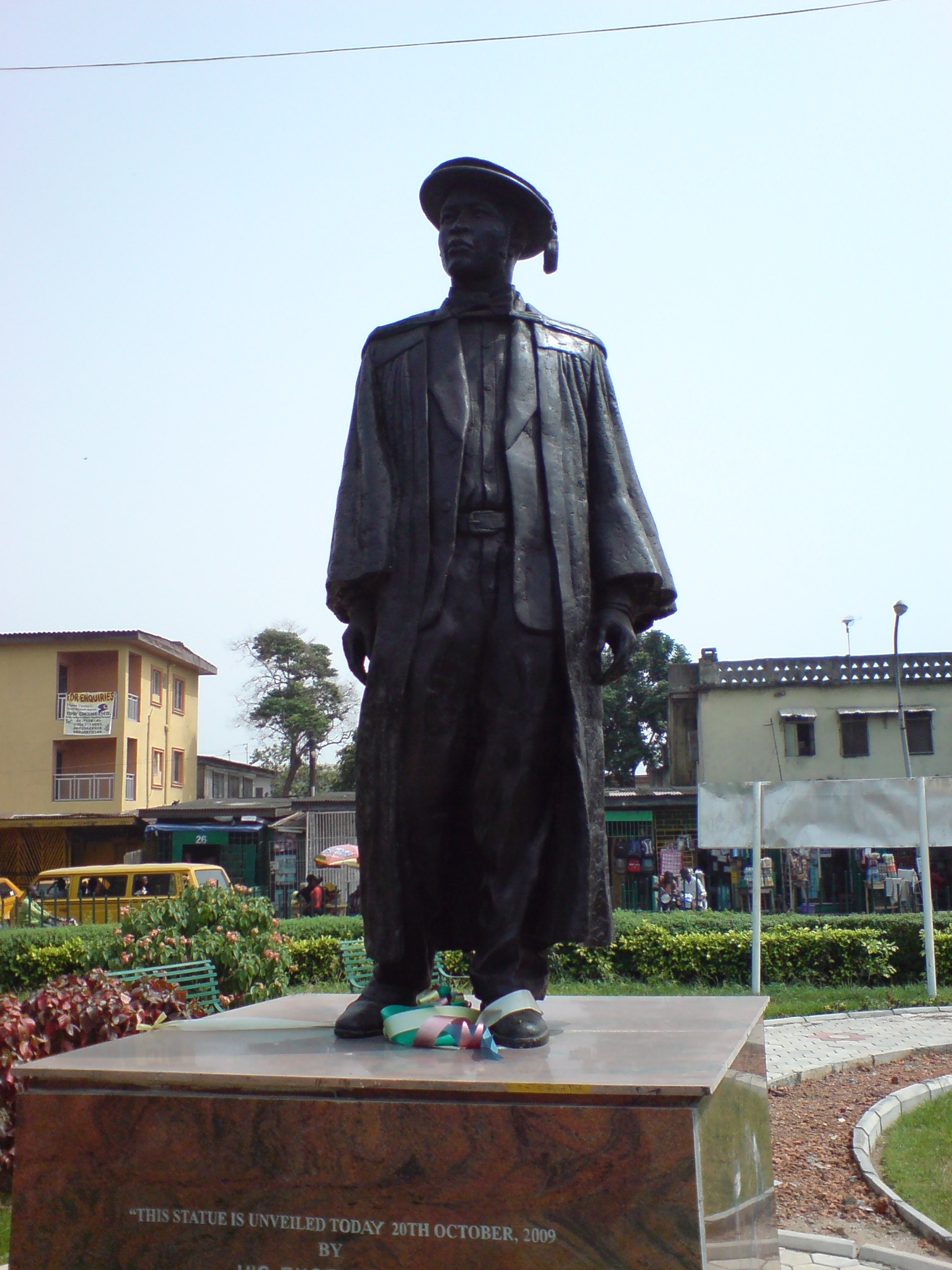
Ayodele Awojobi statue.

Ayodele Awojobi died in the morning of Sunday, 23 September 1984, at the age of 47. His death made headline news in most of the national newspapers for days following and he was laid to rest at Ikorodu Cemetery, Lagos. He was survived by his wife, Mrs Iyabode Mabel Awojobi (née Odetunde), and children.

== Tribute ==
Usually every year till date, a tribute or two in Ayodele's honour would be published in the form of an article in a national newspaper, such as the one published by The Nation on 5 November 2009, entitled "Tribute to Ayodele Awojobi". In October 2009, the governor of Lagos State Babatunde Fashola dedicated a statue of Awojobi at Onike Roundabout, Yaba, Lagos, in a garden named after him. On 23 September 2010, Birrel Street – a prominent street in Yaba Local Government Council Area – was renamed "Prof. Ayodele Awojobi Avenue", a further tribute to Awojobi's memory.

== List of publications ==
=== Research ===
- Vibration of rigid bodies on semi-infinite elastic media – A. O. Awojobi, P. Grootenhuis, 1965
- Plane strain and axially symmetric problems of a linearly non-homogeneous elastic half-space – A. O. Awojobi, R. E. Gibson, 1973
- Vibration of rigid bodies on non-homogeneous semi-infinite elastic media – A. O. Awojobi, 1973
- Torsional vibration of a rigid circular body on an infinite elastic stratum – A. O. Awojobi, 1969
- Torsional vibration of a rigid circular body on a non-homogeneous elastic stratum – A. O. Awojobi, 1973
- Vertical vibration of rigid bodies with rectangular bases on elastic media – A. O. Awojobi, P. H. Tabiowo
- Factors in the design of ultrasonic probes – W. M. R. Smith, A. O. Awojobi, 1979
- Determination of the dynamic shear modulus and the depth of the dominant layer of a vibrating elastic medium – A. O. Awojobi, 1970
- Ground vibrations due to seismic detonation in oil exploration – A. O. Awojobi, O. A. Sobayo, 1974
- Vertical vibrations of a rigid circular body on a non-homogeneous half-space interrupted by a frictionless plane – A. O. Awojobi

=== Educational ===
- Technical Drawing for Secondary Schools. A. O. Awojobi
- 325 Worked Examples in Intermediate Mechanics. A. O. Awojobi
- Notes and Worked Examples in Physics. A. O. Awojobi
- Engineering Drawing. A. O. Awojobi

=== Political ===
- Ayodele Awojobi (1976). Nigeria in search of a social order. Nigerian Institute of International Affairs. OL 13795568M.
- Ayodele Awojobi (1980). Nigeria today. J. West Publications. ISBN 978-978-163-008-8.
- Ayodele Awojobi (1981). Nigeria in search of a political order. J. West Publications. ISBN 978-978-163-013-2.
- Ayodele Awojobi (1982). Where our oil money has gone. OL 3210331M.
