= Shehu Ladan =

Nigerian lawyer

Personal details
- Education: Ahmadu Bello University
- Occupation: Government official
- Profession: Lawyer

Shehu Ladan (21 September 1952 – 4 October 2011) was a Nigerian lawyer, philanthropist and oil and gas management strategist from Kaduna State. Who has contributed to the socio-economic activities of the state and Nigeria at large in different capacities. He was the immediate past Group Managing Director of NNPC in Nigeria.

== Personal life and education ==
Ladan was married to Hajiya Aishahtu Shehu Ladan and together they gave birth to 8 children; Umar Shehu Ladan, Yakubu Shehu Ladan, Ruakayya Shehu Ladan, Abubakar Shehu Ladan, Mukhtar Shehu Ladan, Mubarak Shehu Ladan, Amina Shehu Ladan and Bashir Shehu Ladan.

Late Ladan had his early education at N.A Primary School Tudun Wada before proceeding to Sheikh Sabah College (now Sardauna Memorial College) in Kaduna where he obtained his WASC. He obtained his bachelor (LLB) and masters (LLM) Law degrees at Ahmadu Bello University in Zaria. He is also an alumnus of Harvard Business School, Oxford University and University of Dundee.

== Career ==
After being called to the bar, Ladan served his National Youth Service Corps (NYSC) primary assignment in the State Ministry of Justice, Kano. After NYSC, Ladan served as Staff Solicitor of the Federal Mortgage Bank of Nigeria. He was later Company Secretary/Legal Adviser Kaduna State Rural Electrification Board (REB) and Assistant Director Federal Legal Aid Council of Nigeria, Jos.

Ladan was appointed to Kaduna State executive council in 1987 as Commissioner of Education. In 1989, he was appointed Attorney General and Commissioner for Justice. During his tenure as education commissioner, he founded and established the Nuhu Bamalli Polytechnic Zaria (formerly Kaduna State Polytechnic). He also sponsors research and publications and indigent students from all parts of the state to the institution.

Ladan moved to the oil and gas industry in 1990. He held various positions in the Nigerian National Petroleum Corporation (NNPC), rising to the position, Group General Manager of Human Resources in 2004. In 2006, he was appointed the Deputy Managing Director/CEO of Nigerian Liquefied Natural Gas (NLNG) Ltd, a joint venture company that has NNPC, Shell, Total and Agip as shareholders. In October 2007, he was appointed Group Executive Director (GED) Commercial and Investment of NNPC. And in April 2010 he was appointed the Group Managing Director after a brief recess from the industry.

== Awards and honors ==
- Patron, National Association of Polytechnics (NAPS).
- Kaduna State Amirul Hajj (1990).
- Distinguished Merit Award by Arewa Youth Forum.
- Member, Kaduna State Economic Council.
- Member, Federal University Of Technology Akure Governing Council.
- Continental Distinguished Leadership Service and Merit Award, African Youth Congress.
- Life Fellow, African Youth Congress.
- African Nation Builders Gold Award.
- President Kaduna Forum.
- Distinguished Service Merit Award by Northern Youth Forum.
- Long Service Award by NNPC.
- Award of Excellence by NUPENG.
- Fellow, Nigerian Institute of Management.
- Fellow, Institute of Industrialists and Cooperate Management.
- Member, Institute of Directors.
- Member, Chartered Institute of Arbitrators.
- Member Petroleum Training Institute.
- Honorary fellow of Nuhu Bamalli Polytechnic Zaria (formerly Kaduna State Polytechnic).
- Police Community Relations Award by Kaduna State Police Command
- Prestigious Award by Less Privileged Organization for his immense contributions.
- Member Zazzau Emirate Committee on Development.
- Distinguished Merit Award by Zazzau Youth Development Association.
- Traditional Title of CIGARIN (The Conqueror) Zazzau by Emir of Zazzau.
