= Hudu Abdullahi Ayuba =

- Citizenship: Nigeria
- Occupation: Academic
- Known for: Political science and international relations
- Title: Professor

Academic work
- Institutions: Ahmadu Bello University

Hudu Abdullahi Ayuba is a Nigerian political scientist and professor at Ahmadu Bello University, Zaria. He is a member of the Department of Political Science and International Studies.

== Education ==
Ayuba studied at the University of Nantes in France, where he obtained first-class degrees and completed a PhD in 1992.

== Academic career ==
Ayuba joined the Department of Political Science at Ahmadu Bello University in 1994. He served as Head of the Department of Political Science and International Studies from 2010 to 2014 and was Assistant Dean of the Faculty of Social Sciences from 1998 to 2000. In 2016, Ayuba was elected Dean of the Faculty of Social Sciences at Ahmadu Bello University.

== Public commentary ==
Ayuba has commented on Nigerian and African political issues in the media. He has spoken to news organisations about topics such as insecurity, military coups, civil military relations and international relations.
