= Ibrahim Garba =

Nigerian academic, university administrator

- Born: February 25, 1957 (age 69)
- Education: Ahmadu Bello University
- Occupation: Educationist
- Predecessor: Abdullahi Mustapha

Ibrahim Garba is a Nigerian geologist and university administrator. He was the former vice chancellor of Ahmadu Bello University, Zaria and was succeeded by Kabir Bala. He had also served as the vice chancellor of the Kano State University of Science and Technology, Wudil. Garba hails from Riruwai in Kano State.

== Education ==
Garba studied at Ahmadu Bello University, Zaria, obtaining a BSc in 1980 and an MSc in 1985. He then obtained a diploma from Imperial College, London in 1992, followed by a PhD in Geology from the University of London in 1993.

== Career ==
Garba worked on secondment at the Federal Ministry of Mines and Steel Development, Abuja as Director-General, Nigeria Mining Cadastre Office. He spear-headed the development and implementation of the Mining Cadastre System in Nigeria.

== Fraud controversy ==
On 29 March 2023, the Economic and Financial Crimes Commission (EFCC) took Ibrahim Garba to court over N1 billion fraud. He was charged with money laundering and diversion of the money meant for Kongo Conference Hotel, Zaria between 2013 and 2016.
