= Abdullahi Mustapha =

Nigerian professor of medicinal chemistry

- Born: 2 January 1948 (age 78); Kano, Nigeria
- Occupation: Professor of Medicinal Chemistry at Ahmadu Bello University
- Years active: 1974–present

Abdullahi Mustapha (born 1 February 1948) is a Nigerian Professor of Medicinal Chemistry and former Vice Chancellor of Ahmadu Bello University, Zaria. He was succeeded by Ibrahim Garba as the VC of the university. He occupied this position during the tenure of former president Umar Musa Yar'adua but was re-appointed by the present Nigerian president, His Excellency Gudluck Jonathan .

== Early life ==
Mustapha was born on 1 February 1948 to a Katsina state indigene father and Katsina state mother in Kano but hails from Katsina State, Northern Nigeria.

He attended Rafindadi Primary School in 1955 before he attended Katsina Secondary School but obtained the West Africa School Certificate in 1968 at Government College, Keffi. He further obtained a bachelor's degree in Pharmacy from Ahmadu Bello University in 1973, followed by a University of London doctorate (Ph.D.) in 1981 from Chelsea College, now merged with King's College London.

== Career ==
Mustapha began his academic career in 1974 as a pupil pharmacist at Ahmadu Bello University Teaching Hospital. In 1982, he rose to the position of Senior Lecturer in the Department of Pharmaceutical and Medicinal Chemistry in the department of pharmacy and in 1993, he became a full Professor of Medicinal Chemistry. In 2010, he was appointed as the Vice Chancellor of Ahmadu Bello University and prior to this appointment, he served as the VC of Umaru Musa Yar'adua University.
