= Adamu Ahmed =

Nigerian Professor of Urban and Regional Planning

- Born: 2 April 1964 (age 62)
- Occupations: Academic; professor
- Known for: Academic

Academic background
- Education: Professor of Urban and Regional Planning

Adamu Ahmed (born 2 April 1964) is a Nigerian academician, Professor of Urban and Regional Planning and currently serving as the Vice-Chancellor of Ahmadu Bello University, Zaria. He succeeds Prof. Kabiru Bala on May 1, 2025.

== Education ==
He did his undergraduate and postgraduate studies at Ahmadu Bello University, Zaria, Kaduna State, where he earned BSc in Geography, MSc and PhD in Urban and Regional Planning in 1990 and 2000 respectively. In 2012, he attained the rank of a professor.

== Career ==
In 1991, he was employed as a lecturer by Ahmadu Bello University, where he rose to hold several academic and administrative positions and he served as the head of his department and Director of the ABU Directorate of University Advancement. In June 2024, President Bola Tinubu appointed him as the Pro-chancellor and Chairman of the Governing Council of the Federal University of Education in Kano, Kano State.

Earlier, Prof. Ahmed was appointed by Governor Mohammed Abdullahi Abubakar as chairman of committee on land administration system in Bauchi State. From 2019 to 2021, he served as the Commissioner of Lands and Survey in Bauchi State under the administration of Governor Bala Muhammad.

His latest appointment, which takes effect from 1 May 2025, followed a meeting of the Governing Council of the Ahmadu Bello University led by Dr. Mahmud Yayale Ahmed.

== Research works ==
Prof. Ahmed's research focuses on land cover, land use, climate change, and food security. His notable works include Land Cover, Land Use, Climate Change, and Food Security, co-authored with Y.A. Bununu, and The influence of history on the urban landscape of Zaria, co-authored with Yakubu Bununu.
