= Franca Brown =

Nigerian actress and film producer (born 1967)

- Born: Franca Obianuju Brown; 17 May 1967 (age 59); Onitsha, Anambra State, Nigeria
- Education: Ahmadu Bello University and University of Jos
- Occupations: Actress and film producer
- Awards: City People Special Recognition Award

Franca Obianuju Brown (born May 17,1967) is a Nigerian actress and film producer who in 2016 was a recipient of the City People Movie Special Recognition Award at the City People Entertainment Awards.

== Early life and education ==
Brown began her primary school education at St. Mary’s Primary School in Onitsha, Anambra State, but migrated to Abia State where she completed her primary school education at St. Maria’s Primary School located in Aba and obtained her First School Leaving Certificate. Brown, for her secondary school education, moved to Niger State located in the northern geographical area of Nigeria, to Federal Government Girls College in New Bussa, Niger State, where she obtained her West African Senior School Certificate. Brown, in bid to obtain a B.Sc. degree, applied to Ahmadu Bello University in Zaria, Kaduna State, and was accepted and eventually graduated with a bachelor's degree in law. Brown pursued a second degree and applied to the University of Jos in Plateau State, where she was accepted and eventually graduated with a bachelor’s degree in theatre arts and a master's degree in law.

== Career ==
Brown's acting career received recognition from her role in the TV series titled “Behind The Clouds” Although Brown had made two cameo appearances before her feature on the “Behind The Clouds” TV soap opera series, she had failed to establish herself in the Nigerian movie industry and took acting roles mainly on short stage plays. On one such stage play titled “Swam Karagbe” which was written by Dr. Iyorchia, three Nigerian talent scouts, namely Matt Dadzie, Peter Igho & Ene Oloja, were amongst the audience searching for new talents to feature in a TV movie series, and after the stage play had been concluded, Brown discussed in an interview that she was approached by the three talent scouts and was asked to come for an audition, of which she eventually did and was given the role of Mama Nosa in the TV soap opera series titled “Behind The Clouds”.

Brown is also a movie producer and movie director and has produced & directed a movie titled “Women At Large” of which she was also featured in.

== Award ==
Brown, in 2016, was awarded the MovieCity People Special Recognition Award at the City People Entertainment Awards.

== Personal life ==
Brown was a victim of an arson attack perpetuated by her female domestic staff on her property.

== Selected filmography ==
- The Trade (2023) as Victim's Wife
- Double Dekoi (2023) as Dorothy
- Half Brothers (2023)
- Small World (2023)
- The First Son (2023)
- One Too Many Heart Breaks (2023)
- Hunter's Son (2022) as Mama Ebube
- April (2022)
- Chemistry (2022)
- Uncrushable (2022)
- Love in a Valley (2022)
- Complicated Love (2022)
- Dream Man (2022), a Mama Nneoma
- Behind the Clouds
- Ogadi (2021) as Mama Emeka
- Cheta (2021)
- All Out Of Love (2021)
- My Version Of Tradition (2021)
- Bad Wife Material (2021) as Ugbala
- Akachi (2020) as Inspector Dora
- Plight (2020)
- Never Saw it Coming (2019) as Ndum
- 93 Days (2016) as Ada's Mom
- Plane Crash (2008) as Dorathy
- Women At Large (2007) as Susan
- Cross Of Agony (2006)
- Deep Bondage (2006)
- Desperate Women (2006) as Joy
- Leap Of Faith (2006)
- Serpent In Paradise (2006)
- Clash Of Destiny (2005)
- Endless Passion (2005) as Vivian
- My Sister’s Act (2005)
- Discord (2004)
- Mothers-In-Law (2004)
- Sunrise (2002)
- Tears & Sorrows (2002) as Mrs. Okoye
- Valentino (2002) as Mama T
- My Good Will (2001)
- The Price (1999) as Sister Rebecca
- Obstacles (1998)
- Sawam (1998)
- Nightmare (1997)
- Brotherhood of Darkness (1995) as Priestess
