= Tashe =

Traditional Hausa street performances associated with Ramadan

Tashe is a traditional, culturally important street drama, typically practiced by Hausa children during Ramadan, consisting of dancing, music, and storytelling.

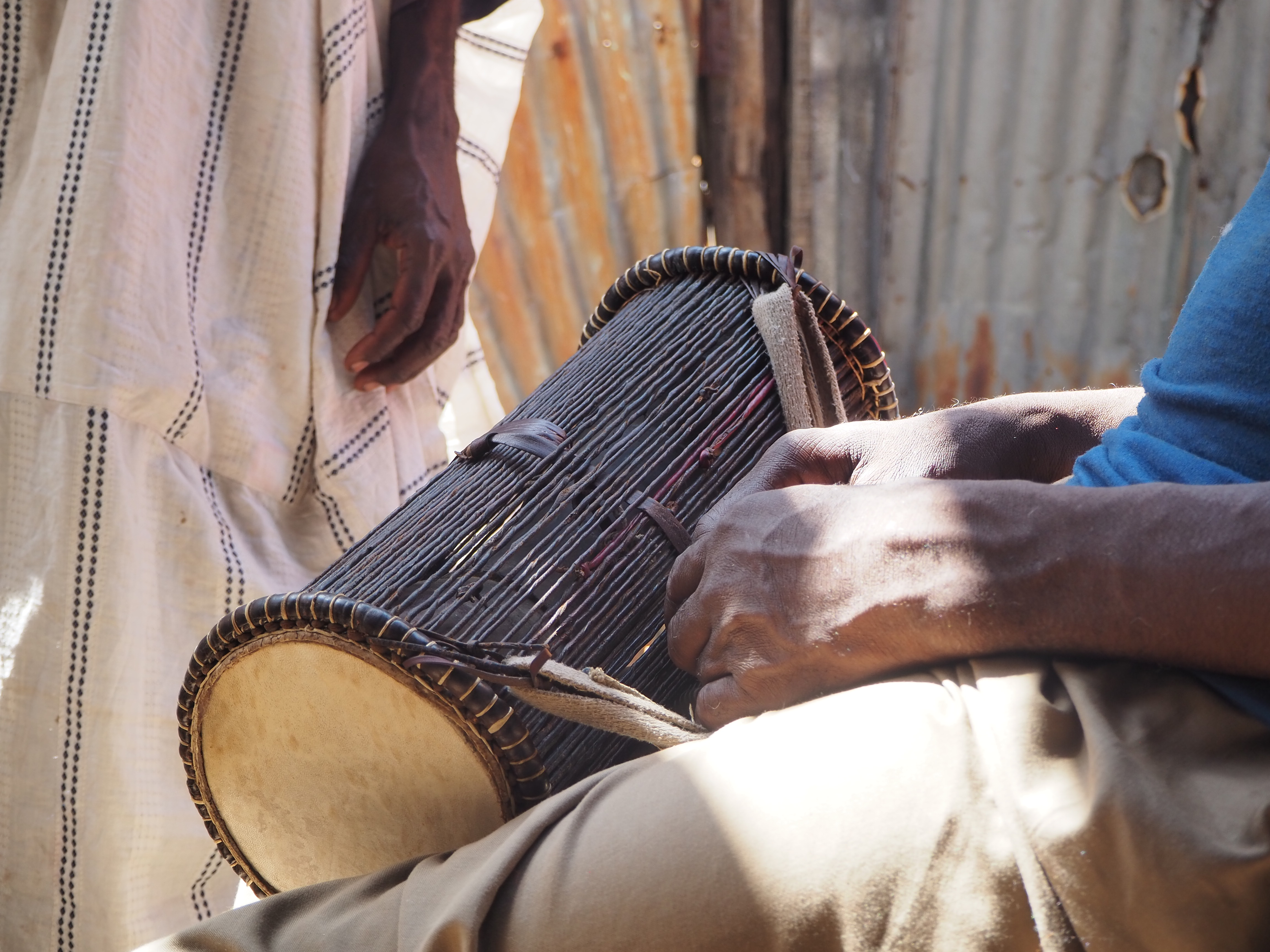
A Hausa drum

== History ==
Hausa culture has a longstanding existence of folktales (Hausa: tatsuniya) primarily told by elderly women, telling stories to entertain and educate children about morals, cultural norms, gender roles, and world view. These stories are often illustrated using poetry, riddles, song, and nonverbal expressions.

The arrival of Islam into Hausaland as early as the 11th century introduced Islamic themes and perspectives into the culture. Children imitated the form of storytelling, ultimately leading to the formation of tashe.

There has been a reported decline in participation among young women, as well as in general, due to security concerns around children roaming the streets. In 2026, Kano police placed a ban on tashe performances, citing security concerns around people exploiting the gathering to engage in crime.

== Etymology ==
Tashe, derived from tashi, means "to wake up" in the Hausa language, referring to the performance being used to wake up community members for Suhur, the pre-dawn meal during Ramadan.

== Performance ==
Tashe starts through the second set of 10 days during the month of Ramadan, and is described as multiple small performances, involving dancing, music, acting, and oral storytelling. The performers are typically children, moving from house to house to perform for the families, or performing at market stalls and community centers. Music plays an important role in the performance, typically drums and singing. Performers' costumes may include false beards, oversized clothing, makeup, walking sticks, and turbans. Sometimes the performers are given gifts or money in exchange for their performances. The performances can be drama or comedy, typically with themes around domestic responsibility, gender roles, and Islamic culture.

== Similar practices ==
Tashe's role is similar to Musahharati, a public figure who wakes up others for suhur during Ramadan and the fajr prayer.

== See also ==
- Hausa literature
