= Ibrahim Abdullahi Waiya =

Nigerian politician

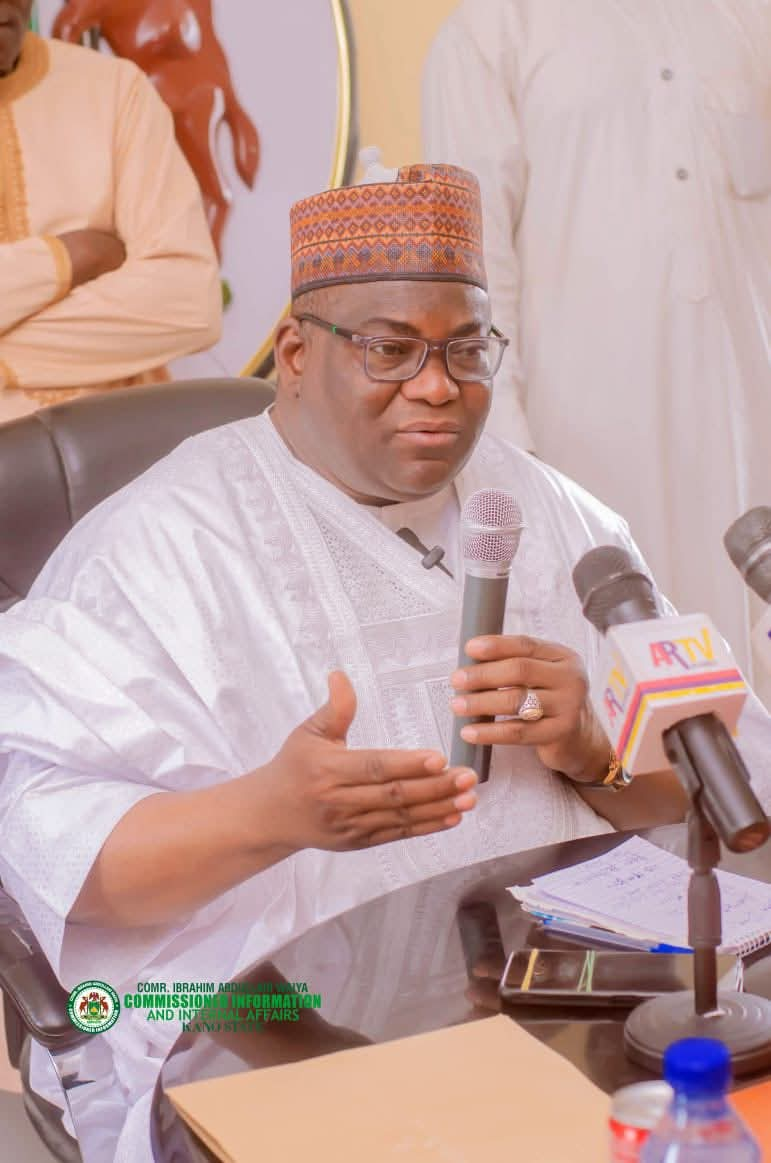
- Commissioner for Information and Internal Affairs Kano State
- Occupations: Civil society activist, legal practitioner, public administrator
- Office: Commissioner for Information and Internal Affairs, Kano State
- Predecessor: Baba Dantiye

Ibrahim Abdullahi Waiya is a Nigerian civil society activist and public administrator who serves as the Commissioner for Information and Internal Affairs in Kano State.
