= Kano State Government =

Government of Kano State in Nigeria

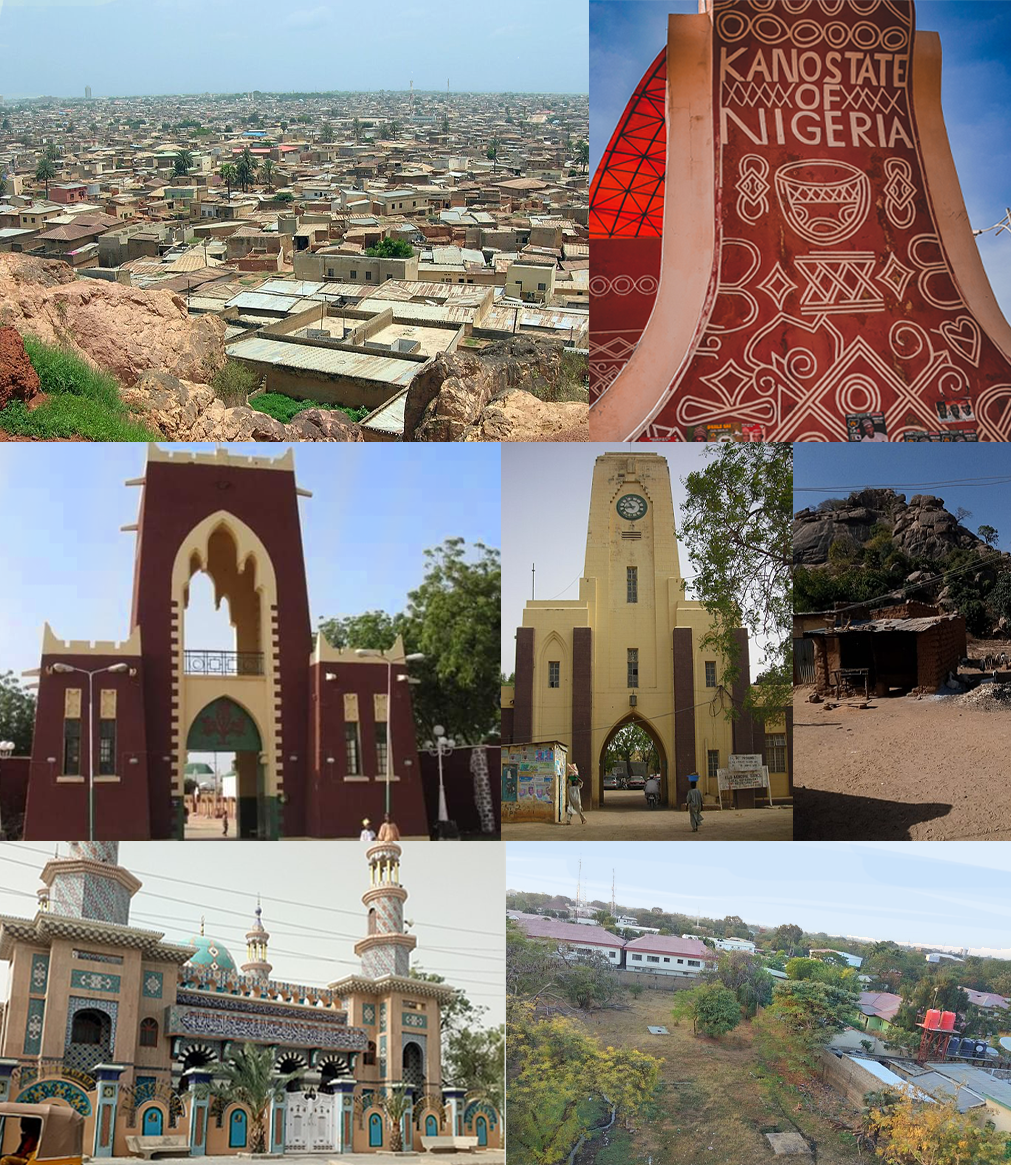
Images of Kano State

Kano State Government is the government of Kano State, concerned with the administration of the state ministries. The government consists of the executive, legislative and Judiciary. The government is headed by the Governor who is the policy-maker and often assisted by the Commissioners and other civil servants of the state.

== Office of the Governor ==
The Office of the Governor was created along with the creation of the state in 1967. It is currently headed by Abba Kabir Yusuf, who is the thirteenth Governor of the State. This office is responsible for the effective coordination of all government activities for the good of the people of the State.

== Judiciary ==
The Judiciary is one of the three co-equal arms of the Lagos State Government. It is concerned with the interpretation of the laws of Kano State government. The judiciary is headed by the Chief Judge of Kano State, appointed by the Governor of Kano State with the approval of the Kano State House of Assembly.

Distinguished members of the Judiciary include the Attorney-General and Kano State Commissioner for Justice as well as the Chief Registrar. The Chief Registrar serves as the head of administration and accountant to the judiciary.

=== Courts ===
The Kano State courts consist of three levels of courts. The High Court is an appellate court that operates under discretionary review, meaning that the Court can choose which cases to hear by granting writs of certiorari. It is the court of last resort. The other two levels are the Magistrates and the Customary Court. In addition to the court, the judiciary also consists of the Judicial Service Commission, with statutory duties that include the promotion and appointment of judicial staff as well as other disciplinary functions. The Chief Judge serves as the commission's chairman.

Dije Abdu Aboki began serving as a magistrate in 1986 and advanced through the legal system to become a chief magistrate in 1992. In 2006, she was appointed as a judge of the Kano State High Court. After Justice Nura Sagir retired in March 2023, she was named Acting Chief Judge of Kano State by former Governor Abdullahi Umar Ganduje.

== Legislature ==
The legislature or state house of assembly is one of the three co-equal arms of the State Government concerned with lawmaking. The legislature consists of elected members from each constituency of the state. The head of the legislature is the Speaker, who is elected by the house.

The building of the legislature is situated inside the Abdu Bako Secretariat Kano Municipal central business district, Kano State.

The legislative function of the legislature is to make laws by passing bills, which must be endorsed by the two-thirds majority of the house. Following the endorsement by the two-thirds majority, the bill is presented to the Governor, who will sign the bill to become law. The assembly assess and approve the annual budget of the state government on presentation by the Governor. The Assembly also play a significant role in the appointment of the state commissioners, Chief Judges and other top officials by the Governor.

== Executive ==
The executive branch is one of the three co-equal arms of the State Government, concerned with policy making and implementation of bills. The executive is responsible for the daily administration of the state. Members of the executive include the Governor, Deputy Governor, and commissioners. There are also other top officials of the state, such as the head of service.

The executives overseas the ministries. Each ministry is headed and coordinated by a commissioner, assisted by a permanent secretary.

=== List of ministries and their commissioners ===
Ministry	Incumbent commissioner
Finance	
Planning and Budget	
Agriculture	
Water Resources	
Commerce, Industry, Cooperatives and Mineral Resources	
Tourism and Culture	
Education	
Higher Education	
Science and Technology	
Youth, and Social Development	
Environment	
Women Affairs	Aisha Saji
Housing	Marwan Ahmad
Transport	Diggol
Local Government and Community Affairs	Aminu Abdussalam Gwarzo
Justice	Lawan Musa
Works and Infrastructure Development	
Religious Affair	Auwal Tijjani
Special Duties	
Information and Internal Affairs	Ibrahim Abdullahi Waiya
Rural Development	

== See also ==
- Executive Council of Kano State
- Kano State
