= Institute of Human Virology Nigeria =

Non-governmental organization focuses on HIV/AIDS related problems in Nigeria

- Abbreviation: IHVN
- Formation: 2004; 22 years ago
- Founder: University of Maryland School of Medicine's Institute of Human Virology
- Founded at: Baltimore, Maryland, USA
- Purpose: Medical
- Region served: Nigeria

The Institute of Human Virology Nigeria (IHVN) is a non-governmental organization that focuses on HIV/AIDS related problems in Nigeria. It was established as an affiliate to the Institute of Human Virology, University of Maryland School of Medicine, Baltimore in 2004. In 2016, IHVN claimed that it reaches 2.3 million Nigerians with HIV testing services, including about 25,000 who tested positive for the disease.

== Major programs ==
Programs at IHVN include:

- HIV Services
- Tuberculosis/Drug Resistant TB Intervention
- Malaria Program
- Cancer Registration/Research
- Training Activities

== Funding ==
The activities of the Institute are funded by international organizations which include:

- Centers for Disease Control and Prevention (CDC)
- The Global Fund to fight AIDS, Tuberculosis and Malaria (GF)
- University of Maryland, Baltimore USA (UMB)
- United States' National Institute for Health (NIH)
- International Development Research Center (IDRC)
- World Health Organization (WHO)
