= Shamsuddeen Usman =

Nigerian politician (born 1949)

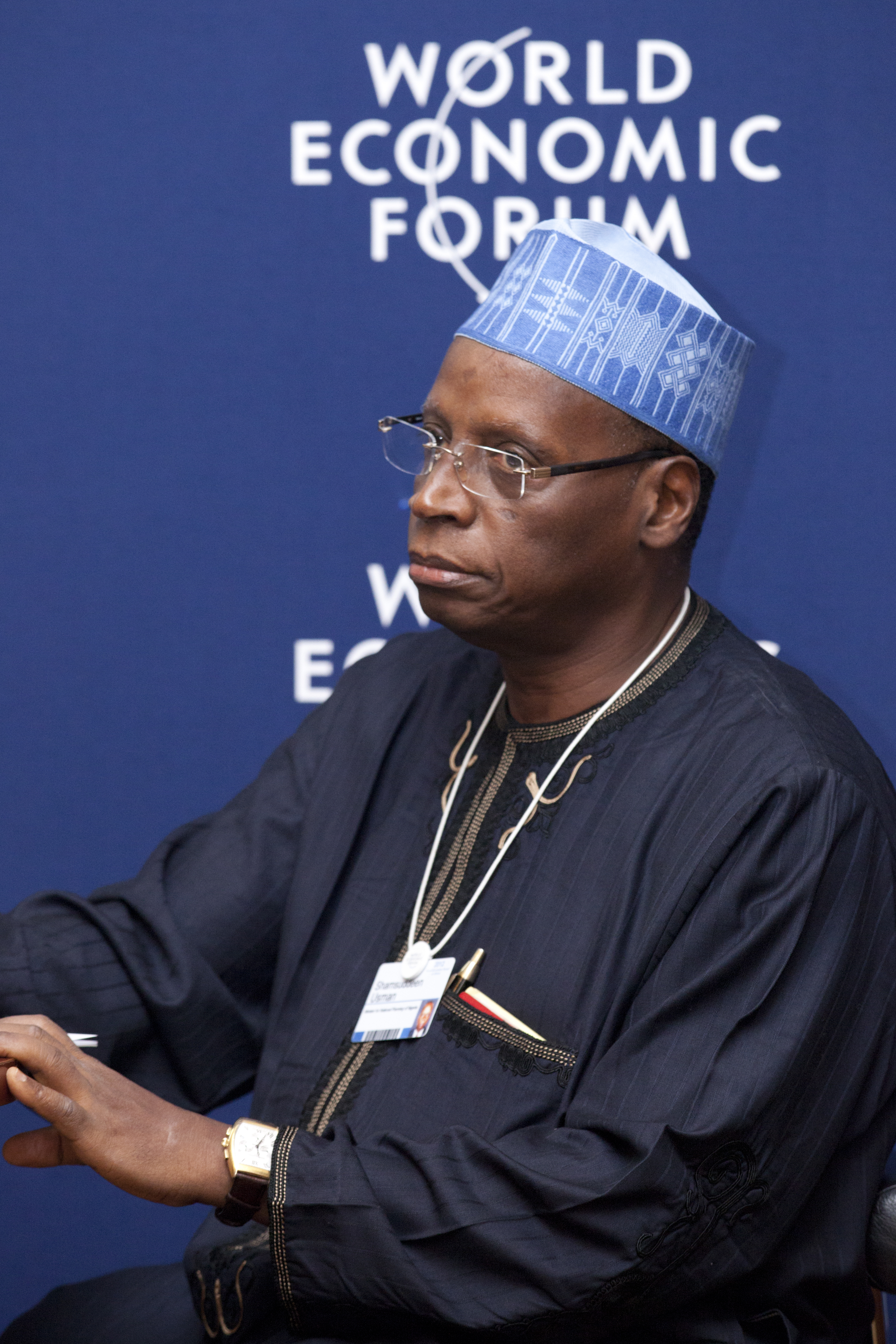
- Shamsuddeen at World Economic Forum on Africa 2012

Minister of National Planning
- In office January 2009 – 11 September 2013
- President: Umaru Yar'Adua; Goodluck Jonathan
- Preceded by: Sanusi Daggash
- Succeeded by: Abubakar Sulaiman

Finance Minister of Nigeria
- In office June 2007 – January 2009
- President: Umaru Musa Yar'Adua
- Preceded by: Nnenadi Usman
- Succeeded by: Mansur Mukhtar

Deputy Governor, Central Bank of Nigeria- Operations
- In office 2004 – June 2007
- Governor: Charles Chukwuma Soludo
- Preceded by: Mahey Rasheed

Deputy Governor, Central Bank of Nigeria- Financial Sector Surveillance
- In office June 1999 – 2004
- Governor: Joseph Oladele Sanusi
- Preceded by: None

Personal details
- Born: 18 September 1949 (age 77) Kano, Northern Region, British Nigeria (now Kano, Kano State, Nigeria)
- Education: London School of Economics; Ahmadu Bello University; Kings College Lagos

Shamsuddeen Usman, CON, OFR (born 18 September 1949) is a Nigerian economist, banker, technocrat and public servant. He is currently the CEO of SUSMAN & Associates, an economic, financial and management consulting firm headquartered in Nigeria. He was the Finance Minister of Nigeria between June 2007 and January 2009 and also served as the Minister of National Planning from January 2009 to September 2013. Usman is the Chairman of Citibank Nigeria Limited.

As Minister of National Planning, he was responsible for the development of Nigeria's long-term development strategy, Nigeria Vision 2020 and the National Integrated Infrastructure Master Plan. During his tenure as the Minister of Finance and National Planning, he was the Chairman of the Nigerian National Economic Management Team.

He represented Nigeria as a Governor on the Governing Boards of the World Bank and the International Monetary Fund. He was a Member of the Federal Executive Council, National Economic Council and the National Council on privatization.

He was the first Nigerian Minister to publicly declare his assets before assuming office as a public officer, an act considered as a sign of accountability and transparency in a country noted for its high levels of corruption.

== Background ==
Usman was born in Warure Quarters of Kano State. His father, an Islamic scholar, died when he was about six years old. He began his education at Dandago Primary School. After attending secondary school at the prestigious Government College Keffi and King's College, Lagos, he gained a BSc. in Economics from Ahmadu Bello University in Zaria, Nigeria. He later won a National scholarship to study for his MSc. and PhD at the London School of Economics and Political Science between 1977 and 1980. His PhD was on "Tax Incentives and Investment in the Nigerian Oil Industry". During his first two years at the London School of Economics, he served as a teaching assistant for the final year class in Public Finance.

== Early career ==
From 1974 to 1976, Usman worked as the Planning Officer for the Kano State Ministry of Economic Planning. He taught Economic Analysis and Public Finance in Ahmadu Bello University, Bayero University Kano and University of Jos between 1976 and 1981. He was a controller at the Nigerian Industrial Development Bank (NIDB) and then served as the Director of Budget/Special Economic Adviser to the Kano State Government between 1981 and 1983. He was then appointed the General manager of NAL Merchant Bank (currently Sterling Bank).

== Impact of Privatisation and Commercialisation on the Nigerian Economy ==
From 1989 to 1991 Usman served as the pioneer Director General of The Technical Committee on Privatisation and Commercialisation, now the Bureau of Public Enterprises. He was responsible for the Phase I of the programme with the mandate to reform public enterprises, as an integral and critical component of the International Monetary Fund-led Structural Adjustment Programme (SAP), which was started in 1986.

Under his supervision, about 88 public enterprises were either fully or partially privatised without any foreign technical assistance. The programme succeeded in relieving the government of the huge and growing fiscal burden of financing public enterprises, minimised the overstretching of government's managerial capacity through a redefinition of the role of the supervising ministries, created a large body of shareholders and deepened and broadened the Nigerian Capital Market to the position of being the most developed in black Africa. The market capitalisation of the Nigerian Stock Exchange (NSE) through which the shares were sold has grown from N8.9 billion in 1987 (before privatisation) to N65.5 billion in 1994 (after the Phase-I). The catalytic effect of the volume of shares released into the market via the privatisation exercise cannot be over emphasised, the TCPC became the current Bureau of Public Enterprises (BPE) in 1993.

The Phase-I of the privatisation generally led to the improved Performance of the privatised enterprises, which inturn led to a considerable increase in the volume of corporate taxes accruing to the national treasury, among several other benefits. The sale of shares and assets realised over N3.7 billion as gross privatisation proceeds from the privatisation of 55 enterprises whose total original investment according to the records of the Ministry of Financed Incorporated (MOFI) was N652 million. This represents less than 2% of the total value of the Federal Government's investments as at 30 November 1990 which stood at N36 billion. Privatisation has massively expanded personal share ownership in Nigeria. By reducing the reliance of public enterprises on the government for finance, the programme of privatisation has encouraged new investments in the enterprises and sectors concerned.

The new operational autonomy of these enterprises and their liberation from political interference in day-to-day management has also improved the internal efficiency of these enterprises allowing them to commercialise their operations, adopt more resource-efficient private sector business models and rationalise labour practices. Flotation of shares of privatised enterprises has greatly stimulated the rapid growth of the Nigerian Capital Market and helped to deepen and broaden it.

== Banking ==
Usman was head-hunted to become the executive director of United Bank for Africa in charge of the International and Investments Sector in 1992. This included direct supervision of the New York Branch. Subsequently, he was appointed by Union Bank of Nigeria in 1993 as executive director and head of Corporate and International Banking. His time at Union Bank was short-lived as NAL Merchant Bank recruited him as managing director and chief executive officer in 1994, a post that he held for over five years. He was also a member of the Committee on Vision 2010.

At the return to democracy in Nigeria in 1999, he was appointed as the Deputy Governor of the Central Bank of Nigeria (CBN) in charge of Domestic Monetary and Banking Policy, later named Financial Sector Surveillance. He was also responsible for heading Project Eagles, the CBN's reform programme, responsible for converting the organisation into one of the most efficient, effective and goal-focused institutions in Nigeria. From January 2004 to June 2007 he was the Deputy Governor in charge of Operations Directorate in charge of the Operations Directorate. From 2005, he served as Chairman and then Alternate Chairman of the Nigerian Security Printing and Minting Company Limited (NSPMC) also known as "the Mint". In this role, he oversaw the introduction of N500 and N1000 notes and the reorganisation of the Mint into a more profitable company with greater operating efficiency.

He has served as the Chairman of the Abuja Stock Exchange, Nigerian Export-Import Bank (NEXIM) and Financial Institutions Training Centre. He is also a fellow of the Nigerian Economic Society (NES) and has also served as President of the Society between 1986 and 1987. He was also a board member of the African Economic Research Consortium and the African Export-Import Bank.

== Ministerial career ==
Usman was appointed the Minister of Finance of Nigeria from May 2007 to January 2009. In this role, he served as the head of the Economic Management Team and as the Vice Chairman of the National Council on Privatisation. Usman introduced a system of performance-based budgeting and pursued various economic reforms such as reducing the average Nigerian Ports Clearing time from approximately 2 months to approximately 14 days during his tenure; increasing the capitalization, trust and effectiveness of the insurance sector together with pursuing the implementation of the Insurance Act; cancellation of illegal waivers and concessions which led to revenue leakages of over $2 billion; reducing Nigeria's external debt; and easing customs charges and capital market charges for operators to promote a vibrant and hassle-free environment for investment in the economy.

In times leading to the presentation of the government's budget by the President (Umaru Musa Yar'Adua) to the National Assembly, Usman did not enjoy a cordial relationship with a few Members of the Senate and House of Assembly as both, on all occasions during the preparation of the budget, were pushing for increased government spending against Usman's wishes, particularly as the Nation was suffering from dwindling oil revenues. Usman claimed the reason for this is that the Economy of Nigeria lacked the capacity to take this increased spending, given its deflated revenue base and in order to control inflation and curtail corruption and improper implementation as in the Power Sector during the Obasanjo administration; this should be avoided. Usman blamed the low level of execution of the 2008 budget partly to the delays caused by the National Assembly in approving the budget, a statement that the Members of the National Assembly were very unhappy with.

In preparing the 2007 (appropriation), 2008 (appropriation) and 2009 budgets, Usman also introduced a system of budgeting based on Medium Term Development Plans as opposed to misguided annual budgeting which showed coherency with respect to national development plans in succeeding years, as was done in the past.

In a similar manner to Trevor Manuel, the previous Finance Minister of South Africa, Usman was appointed the minister/deputy chairman of the National Planning Commission of Nigeria and as the chairman of the Steering Committee on Nigeria Vision 2020 in January 2009. In this role, he was responsible for Economic and Developmental Strategy of the Nation through the formulation of a Medium Term National Plan/Policy Framework, a Long-Term National Plan (Nigeria Vision 2020) and working with the Ministry of Finance to set the overall objectives of the Annual Budget (Short-Term Plan).

He was also responsible for supervising the Monitoring and Implementation of these National Development Plans, the European Development Fund (EDF) Country Strategy Paper (CSP) and the National Indicative Programme (NIP). As the Minister of National Planning, he also oversees the National Bureau of Statistics, the Centre for Management and Development and the Nigerian Institute of Social and Economic Research (NISER).

He was mentioned by Sanusi Lamido Sanusi as one of the major individuals that made a tremendous impact in Nigerian economy and their contributions at that moment would help alleviate the current economic recession.

He was a member of the Presidential Steering Committee that dealt with the 2008 financial crisis.

=== Minister of National Planning (January 2009 to September 2013) ===
As Minister of National Planning, Usman:

- Created the Nigeria Vision 2020 document with input from a wide variety of stakeholders (e.g. Youth, States, Women, Engineers, People with Disabilities)
- National Strategy for the Development of Statistics which is to generate data for national planning
- Developed a national framework which is to be used for the evaluation of Ministries, Departments and Agencies' performance
- An evaluation of the 7-point agenda and other government policies
- Four-year implementation plan for the Vision 2020 document
- A medium-term expenditure framework on which the national budget is based.

== Post-Ministerial career ==
After his tenure as a minister, Usman continued his involvement in both the public and private sectors through several notable board appointments across diverse industries, including finance, healthcare, education, and natural resources.

In 2015, Usman was appointed Chairman of Union Trustees Management Services Ltd and Songhai Health Trust Ltd. He expanded his involvement in the education sector in 2017 when he became Chairman of Greensprings Educational Services Ltd, followed by his role as Chairman of Rainbow Educational Services Ltd in 2018.

Usman's engagement in healthcare and natural resources grew in 2019, as he was appointed Chairman of Nisa Premier Hospitals and Chairman of African Natural Resources and Mines Ltd. That same year, he was appointed Director of Emzor Pharmaceutical Industries Ltd.

In the financial sector, Usman joined the board of Citibank Nigeria Ltd as an Independent Non-Executive Director in 2017. His contributions to the bank were recognized in 2022, when he was elevated to Chairman of Citibank Nigeria.

In 2023, he took on a key public sector role as Chairman of the Ministry of Finance Incorporated (MOFI), the government agency responsible for managing the Nigerian federal government's investment portfolio.

These roles highlight Dr. Usman's continued prominence in Nigeria's socio-economic development through his leadership and governance across multiple sectors.

== Nigeria Sovereign Wealth Fund ==
In the years preceding 2008, Nigeria benefited from the surge in oil prices, which allowed the government to build up excess reserves and increase public expenditure. However, Usman had identified that oil price volatility posed very high risks to growth in Nigeria's oil-dependent economy, and as such pushed for the establishment of a sovereign wealth fund, which will serve as a long-term saving fund for future generations and also as a development fund for socio-economic projects It was planned to be similar to the Government Pension Fund of Norway. Normally, excess revenue (i.e., actual revenue less budgeted revenue) was saved in the excess crude account, to prevent overheating the economy, though as there is no legal arrangement for the management of the excess crude account-: However as there was no legal arrangement for the crude account and no mandate for it to be used as a future generations, as Sovereign Wealth Fund became necessary to enhance efficiency in the management of the country's reserves. He constituted a Presidential Technical Committee on the Establishment of the Nigeria Sovereign Wealth Fund, which submitted its report to the National Economic Council and the President. However, due to his direct redeployment to the Ministry of National Planning, he was not able to directly oversee the establishment of the Sovereign Wealth Fund.

== Ministerial screening ==
Following the dissolution of the cabinet by then acting president, Goodluck Jonathan on February 10, 2010, Usman was one of nine re-nominated to serve as a government minister in the new cabinet out of a total of forty-two. This was due to his neutrality on political issues and good working relationship with the acting president. However, Usman's re-nomination was not viewed favorably by members of the Kano State PDP chapter, as they perceived Usman to be a technocrat and not a politician, and as such the People's Democratic Party stakeholders in Kano State. This led to political lobbying from several interest groups to prevent his nomination. As a result, it appeared that the National Assembly had delayed his screening and by the next morning, the local newspapers were reporting that he had been dropped as a Minister due to political interests against his appointment as a Technocrat.

However, on the same morning of the newspaper reports, Usman was the first to be screened by the Senate where he answered a variety of questions on the economy, and answered questions on his performance as a Minister of Finance and National Planning. It was here where he made his famous statements on his battles with the economic mafia in Nigeria who sabotage the government's revenue generating ability.

I had taken on so many mafia; I had taken on the customs mafia, I had taken on the tax concession mafia who are draining this country out of its revenues. Everybody knows the Committee I set up under Senator Udoma saved this country billions of naira. I took on the oil importation mafia; I took on the ports system mafia because I was trying to achieve 48 hours clearance.

== Philanthropy ==
Usman is the chairman and one of the founding members of the Kano Peace and Development Initiative (KAPEDI), a group of concerned indigenes of Kano State driven to rebuild peace and the economic well being of Kano State, especially after the religious conflict in 2004.

He also started Gidauniyar Alheri, an NGO in the Garangamawa area of Kano city that provides human resource development training to youths and carries out other charitable activities in the state.

On 17 August 2002, the Gidauniyar Alheri Community Services was founded to help the people of the 10 wards of Gwale local government in Kano state cope with issues like poverty, illiteracy, and a lack of sufficient healthcare. Over 200 thousand people have taken advantage of the Gidauniyar Alheri Community Health Centre's free medical services since it opened in an effort to lower the state of Kano's alarmingly high rates of maternal and infant mortality.

Usman is also the chairman and founding member of the Kano-Jigawa professional forum. The forum was established in 2018 with the goal of encouraging young people in both states to become well-educated professionals. All of the forum's executive members were previously national leaders of various professional associations.

== Awards ==
- This Day Minister of the Year 2007
- Vanguard Banker's Award: Banking Icon
- Honorary Fellow, Chartered Institute of Bankers of Nigeria (CIBN)
- This Day Tomorrow's 50 Leaders (2004)
- Fellow, Nigerian Economic Society
- 3rd place National Winner John F. Kennedy Essay Competition (1969)
- Fellow, Society for corporate Governance Nigeria
- Officer of the Order of the Federal Republic (OFR)
- Commander of the Order of the Niger (CON)

== Publications ==
- Shamsuddeen Usman (September 2024). Public Policy And Agent Interests, Bookcraft
