= Yemi =

Yẹmí
- Gender: Unisex
- Language: Yoruba

Origin
- Origin: Nigerian
- Meaning: befits me
- Region of origin: South-West Nigeria

Other names
- Related names: Folayemi

Yẹmí audio is a unisex Nigerian and Yoruba given name. It means befit me and is the diminutive form for many Yoruba names such as Oláyemí meaning Wealth befits me, Olúyẹmí meaning God befits me, Adéyẹmí meaning Crown befits me, and others.

== Notable people with the name ==
- Yemi Abiodun (born 1980), English footballer
- Yemi Adamolekun, Nigerian activist
- Yemi Adesanya (born 1978), Nigerian accountant
- Yemi Ajibade (1929–2013, Nigerian playwright and actor
- Yemi Akinyemi Dele (born 1981), Czech choreographer
- Yemi Alade (born 1989), Nigerian singer-songwriter
- Yemi Akinseye George (born 1963), Nigerian law professor
- Yémi Apithy (born 1989), French-Beninese sabre fencer
- Yemi Fawole (born 1985), Nigerian chess player
- Yemi Idowu (born 1968), Nigerian businessman
- Yemi Kale, Nigerian statistician
- Yemi Mobolade, mayor of Colorado Springs, Colorado
- Yemi Odubade (born 1984), Nigerian footballer
- Yemi Osinbajo (born 1957), Nigerian lawyer and politician
- Yemi Shodimu (born 1960), Nigerian filmmaker
- Yemi Tella (c. 1951–2007), Nigerian football coach
- Yemi Elebuibon (born 1947)
