= Oyeyemi =

Yoruba given name

- Language: Yoruba

Origin
- Origin: Nigeria
- Meaning: the kingship belongs to me
- Region of origin: South western Nigeria

Oyeyemi is a Yoruba given name. Loosely interpreted, it means "the kingship befit me".

== Notable people include ==
- Helen Oyeyemi (born 1984), British novelist
- Modupe-Oreoluwa Oyeyemi Ola (born 1990), Nigerian rapper and singer
- Fawole John Oyeyemi (born 1985), Nigerian chess player.
- Boboye Oyeyemi (born 1960), Federal Road Safety Corps corps marshal/head
