= Idowu =

Idowu audiois a surname and given name. Notable people with the name include:

== Surname ==
- Akinjide Idowu (born 1996), Nigerian footballer
- Bolaji Idowu (1913–1995), Nigerian Methodist leader
- Brian Idowu (born 1992), Russian footballer
- Dorcas Idowu (born 1903), Cameroonian politician
- Olumide Idowu (born 1987), Nigerian youth campaigner and climate change activist
- Oluyinka Idowu (born 1972), British athlete
- Phillips Idowu (born 1978), British athlete
- Saheed Idowu (born 1990), Congolese table tennis player
- Yemi Idowu (born 1968), Nigerian businessperson

== Given name ==
- Idowu Philips (born 1942), Nigerian actress
- Idowu Sofola (1934–2018), Nigerian jurist
