= Abubakar Sulaiman =

Nigerian politician and civil servant

Prof. Abubakar Olanrewaju Sulaiman
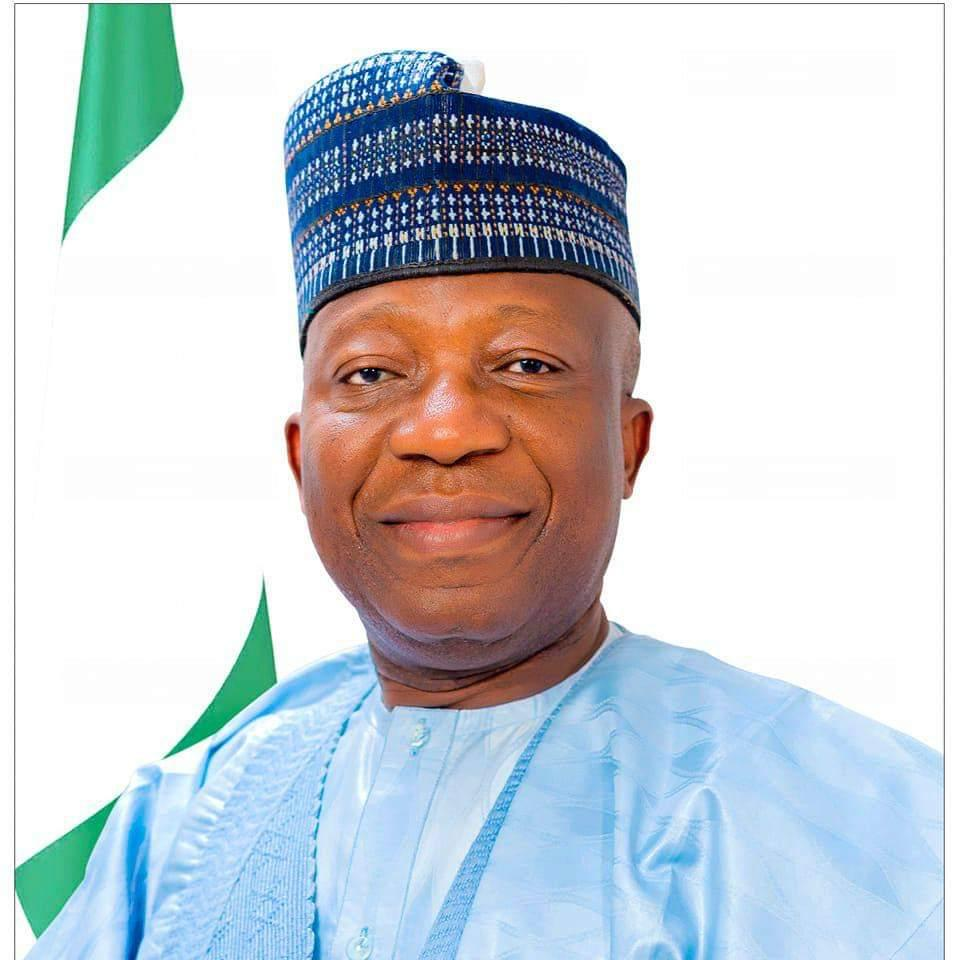

Director General at the National Institute of Legislative and Democratic Studies.
- Incumbent
- Assumed office June 2019

Minister of National Planning
- In office 2014–2015
- Preceded by: Shamsudeen Usman
- Succeeded by: Udoma Udo Udoma as Minister of Budget and National Planning

Personal details
- Born: Kwara, Nigeria
- Occupation: Academic

Professor Abubakar Olanrewaju Sulaiman is a Nigerian academic and public officer. He is the current Director General at the National Institute of Legislative and Democratic Studies. He was former Minister of National Planning of the Federal Republic of Nigeria from July 2014 to May 2015.

== Education and career ==
Sulaiman is from Kwara State, Nigeria. In 1990, he graduated from Ahmadu Bello University with a degree in political science. In 1995, he got his master's degree in International Relations & Strategic Studies from the University of Jos. He got his Ph.D. in International Relations from University of Abuja in 2003. He was awarded a Certificate in Public Leadership from Harvard Kennedy School of Government in January 2023. With over 20 year of lecturing and research, he is professor of political Science with University of Abuja.

In 2019, Sulaiman was appointed Director General at the National Institute for Legislative and Democratic Studies. He was reappointed in April 2023 for another four-year tenure.

== Political views ==
In 2015, Sulaiman, while in the office of National Planning Minister, accused the then government of Kwara State of being corrupt after insisting the processes through which contracts were being awarded was not transparent enough. In November 2017, Sulalman criticized Buhari's administration for the killing of 400 members of indigenous People of Biafra, and Islamic Movement in Nigeria killed under his tenure.
