= Dauda Biu =

Nigerian road safety administrator (1964–2026)

- Born: Dauda Ali Biu; 1964; Zaria, Northern Region, Nigeria
- Died: 11 October 2026 (aged 62); Abuja, Federal Capital Territory, Nigeria
- Citizenship: Nigeria
- Education: Ahmadu Bello University
- Occupations: Former Corps Marshal and Chief Executive Officer of the Federal Road Safety Corps
- Years active: 1988-2024
- Organization: Federal Road Safety Corps
- Predecessor: Boboye Oyeyemi
- Successor: Shehu Mohammed

Dauda Ali Biu (1964 – 11 October 2026) was a Nigerian road safety administrator who served as the Corps Marshal and Chief Executive Officer of the Federal Road Safety Corps from July 2022 to May 2024. He became part of the organisation in 1988 and became the 8th Corps Marshal in 2022.

== Early life and education ==
Biu was born in 1964 in Sabon Gari, Zaria, in present-day Kaduna State, Nigeria. He obtained a Master of Business Administration (MBA) from Ahmadu Bello University.

== Career ==
Biu joined the Federal Road Safety Corps in 1988. He became Assistant Corps Marshal in charge of Finance and Accounts in 2014 and was promoted to Deputy Corps Marshal in 2016.

== Corps Marshal ==
In July 2022, President Muhammadu Buhari appointed Biu as acting Corps Marshal following the retirement of Boboye Oyeyemi. In December 2022, Buhari approved Biu's appointment as the substantive Corps Marshal and Chief Executive Officer of the FRSC, effective from 23 December 2022. Biu served as Corps Marshal until May 2024. He was succeeded by Shehu Mohammed.

== Death ==
Biu died at a hospital in Abuja, on 11 October 2026, at the age of 62. His death was confirmed by a family member, Adamu-Isa Gunda, who was his nephew.
