= Kemi (given name) =

Female given name

Kẹ́mi
- Gender: Female
- Language: Yoruba

Origin
- Origin: Nigerian
- Meaning: Pamper me, or care for me, or cherish me
- Region of origin: South West Nigeria

Kẹ́mi is a common Nigerian given female name of Yorùbá origin which means "cherish me" or "pamper me".

It is the diminutive form of Adékẹ́mi, which means "crown has cherished me". Other full forms of the name includes Fọ́lákẹ́mi, Ifákẹ́mi, Ọ̀ṣunkẹ́mi "Ọ̀ṣun cares for me", Oyèkẹ́mi, and Olúkẹ́mi "God cares for me". (In this case “Olú” means God, “kẹ́“ means pampers, cares, or cherishes, and “mi” means me.)

== Notable People with the name ==
- Kemi Badenoch a British politician.
- Kẹ́mi Adétiba Nigerian film-maker
- Kemi Adekoya Bahraini Athlete
- Kẹ́mi Adeoṣun Accountant and Investment Banker.
- Kemi Olusanya (Kemistry) Drum and bass Disc Jockey
- Oluwakemi Adejoro Ojo a Nigerian actress and TV presenter.
