= Youth Earnestly Ask for Abacha =

Youth Earnestly Ask for Abacha (YEAA) was a campaign formed in 1997 to urge General Sani Abacha to self succeed and run for Nigeria's presidency.(Youth Activism: An International Encyclopedia, Volume 2 PAGE 447) The YEAA campaign, led by Daniel Kanu, placed billboards around the country, publicized advertisements in the media and sponsored editorials to encourage support for Abacha. They were also in support of Vision 2010, a projected economic plan for Nigeria to improve economically and socially. (Regime Change and Succession Politics in Africa: Five Decades of Misrule)

== Two Million Man March ==
The support of the former military leader culminated in 1998 with what is now famously remembered as 2 Million Man March, the largest gathering in history of Nigeria, coordinated by YEAA and NACYAN. Africa Research Bulletin reported that YEAA had distributed free exercise books to schools, that it had plans to distribute subsidized imported "Abacha Rice" and that it had bought two new buses, equipped with speakers and modern communications equipment (20 Mar. 1998 13002). According to Daniel Kanu, everything was done for the Nigerian youths who had been neglected for decades. He also claimed that if the youths continue to be neglected, the crime and terrorism in Nigeria will escalate. According to an interview with Daniel Kanu the costs of the rally, estimated at 400-500 million Naira, were paid for by "patriotic individuals" (NTA TV 5 Mar. 1998; Voice of Nigeria 3 Mar. 1998) As alleged in the book Regime Change and Succession Politics in Africa: Five Decades of Misrule, the march was likely government-backed and nearly 2.5 billion Naira was spent on the march. (PG 115 Repressive State and Resurgent Media Under Nigeria’s Military Dictatorship) After the death of General Sani Abacha, the following governments abandoned implementation of Vision 2010
