= Ìdòwú =

Nigerian given name

Idowu
- Gender: Unisex
- Language: Yoruba

Origin
- Origin: Nigeria
- Meaning: Child born after a set of twins
- Region of origin: South West, Nigeria

Ìdòwú // is a Nigerian given name and surname of Yoruba origin. It means "child born after a set of twins”.

Notable individuals with the name include:

- Oluyinka Idowu, British athlete
- Phillips Idowu, British athlete
- Saheed Idowu, table tennis player
- Yemi Idowu (born 1968), Nigerian businessman
