= Tobiloba Ajayi =

Nigerian female lawyer and disability rights activist

- Born: Oluwatobiloba Ajayi; Lagos, Nigeria
- Occupations: Writer, Lawyer, activist

Tobiloba Ajayi is a Nigerian lawyer and disability rights advocate. She has cerebral palsy. She was awarded a Mandela Washington Fellowship in 2016. She obtained a master's degree in international law from the University of Hertfordshire, United Kingdom. Her disability advocacy includes contributing to Nigeria Vision 2020 on disabilities matters and "The Lagos State Disability Law". She has authored three books.

== Early life and education ==
Ajayi is the fourth of the five children of her family. Her parents were reluctant to enroll her into school at an early age because of her disability. She could neither sit, stand nor walk. Her education started at the age of three and she completed her secondary and tertiary education with a law degree in Nigeria before moving to the United Kingdom to obtain a master's degree in International law from the University of Hertfordshire.

== Career ==
Early in her career she worked at the Mobility Aid and Appliances Research and Development Center. She contributed to Nigeria Vision 2020 on disabilities matters and was part of the team that drafted "The Lagos State Disability Law". She was awarded a Mandela Washington Fellowship in 2016. As of January 2017 she worked at Benola Cerebral Palsy Initiatives. As of February 2018 she ran the organisation "Let CP Kids Learn", which promotes the education of Nigerian children with cerebral palsy and offers advice and support to their parents.

=== Works ===
- Inspirations. CreateSpace Independent Publishing Platform. 2013. ISBN 978-1-974596-80-5.
- Who's With Me?: The Bible Meets Life-31 Days of Practical Christianity. Tate Pub & Enterprises Llc. 2015. ISBN 978-1-63418-386-4.
- Observe to Do: From Rhetoric to Real Faith. Tate Publishing & Enterprises, LLC. 2016. ISBN 978-1-68142-667-9.
