= Yemi Kale =

Prominent Nigerian Economist

Statistician General of the National Bureau of Statistics of Nigeria
- In office 26 August 2011 – 26 August 2021
- Succeeded by: Simon B. Harry

Personal details
- Education: London School of Economics and Political Science

Yemi Kale is a Nigerian economist, statistician, and public policy expert who is currently the Group Chief Economist and Managing Director of Research and Trade Intelligence at the African Export Import Bank. He was the Statistician General of the National Bureau of Statistics of Nigeria from 2011 to 2021. Under his tenure, the GDP of Nigeria was recalculated, and following the recalculation, declared the largest GDP in Africa. At the National Bureau of Statistics he led what has been described as a data revolution modernizing data systems and reforming the institution and transforming it into a globally recognized and respected institution enhancing credibility and public trust in Nigeria’s official data. He was also Partner, Chief Economist and Head of West African Research at KPMG Financial Services, Technical Adviser to the Nigerian Minister of Budget and National Planning, Special Adviser to the Nigerian Minister of Finance and Group Head of Research and Investment Strategy at Investment Banking and Trust Company, now Stanbic IBTC Bank.

== Life ==
He was born into a family of medical professionals. His father, Oladele Kale, a preventive and social medicine professor. His mother Aderonke Kale was a military psychiatrist who became the first female major-general in the Nigerian Army, rising to command the Nigerian Army Medical Corps. Yemi Kale graduated with a BSc (first-class honours) in economics from Addis Ababa University. Additionally, he holds an MSc (with distinction) as well as a PhD in economics from the London School of Economics and Political Science (LSE). Kale has worked as an equity analyst and a quantitative research analyst where he later left to become head of research and investment strategy at what is now Stanbic IBTC Bank, where he is credited with being largely responsible for the development of investment research in Nigeria while being head of research at what is now Stanbic IBTC.In his current role at the African Export-Import Bank, he focuses on African trade, macroeconomics, and development policy

== Statistician General ==
Kale assumed office in 2011 at just 35 years of age making him the youngest Nigerian to ever hold the position. He was subsequently reappointed in 2016 making him the first and so far the only chief executive in the agency's history to serve two terms as statistician general. Kale is also a member of the boards of Dataphyte, Accountability Lab, SFS Capital Nigeria, Limited and many others. Before assuming office Kale acted as a special adviser to the Nigerian Minister of Finance and later as a technical adviser to the Nigerian Minister of Budget and National Planning as well as group head of research and strategy at Investment Banking and Trust Company, now Stanbic IBTC Bank. In addition, Kale is a member of the World Economics Association, UK Royal Economic Society, and a fellow of the UK Royal Statistical Society. He has also been a senior adviser at the World Bank.

He is also a fellow of the Nigerian Statistical Association and a fellow of the Institute of Chartered Administrators and Researchers of Nigeria among others. At The National Bureau of the Statistics he has been applauded by both Nigerian and foreign observers from his reforms in the data process which many believe has restored sanity to the data production process in Nigeria. Kale is commended for introducing methodology updates, some decades old, using modern technology such as Computer Assisted Personal Interview Devices to gather data and improving platforms for data dissemination including a data portal, upgraded website and app and the use of infographics to make data easily understandable by users. Under him timeliness of data, data quantity and quality has been greatly enhanced and data credibility improved significantly.

He is highly regarded for his fierce refusal to tamper with data or rejection of the politicization of data which has gained him recognition from both pro and anti governments stakeholders as well as the international community. Within Nigeria and across Africa, widely regarded as one of the country's leading experts in economic statistics and public policy and is often cited in discussions on inflation, GDP, employment, trade, and broader economic policy because of his long experience in both the public and private sectors. In August 2016 he declared that Nigeria's economy had entered into a recession, the first time in 25 years. Kale was awarded the National Productivity Order of Merit for outstanding performance, professionalism and diligence in February 2017 by the Nigerian President Muhammad Buhari. Dr Kale is a recipient of severel private, public and international awards for exceptional performance throughout his career which cuts across the public, private sectors and from international organizations. Since successfully completing his two tenures as Statistician General, he was appointed Chief Economist and Head is West Africa Research at KPMG Financial Services and is currently Group Chief Economist and Managing Director at the African Export Import Bank.

== Recognition ==
Kale was awarded the African Financial Analyst of the Year award by the African Investor magazine in 2009. Kale was also awarded the National Productivity Order of Merit by the Nigerian President in February 2017. He has served on several presidential committees and advisory bodies and is an alumnus of the Harvard Kennedy School of Government leadership in government as well as the IMD Business School High Performance Leadership Programs amongst others.
