= Daniel Kanu =

Daniel Kanu may refer to:

- Daniel Kanu (politician) (born 1971), Nigerian politician and entrepreneur
- Daniel Kanu (footballer) (born 2004), Sierra Leonean footballer
