= Folayemi =

Foláyẹmí
- Gender: Female
- Language: Yoruba

Origin
- Origin: Yoruba
- Meaning: "make me worthy of success"
- Region of origin: South West, Nigeria

Other names
- Variant forms: Fọlá, Yẹmí
- Related names: Fọláṣadé Fọlárin Folahanmi Folake Folajimi Fọlákúnmi Fọlawe Fọláfẹ́mi

Folayemi audiois a given name of Yoruba origin, and translates to, "make me worthy of success". It is a compound of Yoruba words fi -"use" ọlá -"wealth, nobility" yẹ -"befit, benefit" mí -"me". The name is predominant in South West Nigeria, primarily given to females, though it is sometimes used for males. Variants include Fọlá, and Yẹmí.

== People with the name Folayemi ==
- Folayemi Wilson, American artist, designer
- Yemi Blaq, born as Folayemi Olatunji, Nigerian film actor and song actor

== See also ==
- Folakemi
