= Fola =

Fola may refer to:

- Fódla, (sometimes Fóla or Fola), a goddess in Irish mythology
- Fola (name)
- Fola (singer), born 2001
- Fola, West Virginia, an unincorporated community in West Virginia, United States
- CA Fola Esch, an athletics club from Esch-sur-Alzette, Luxembourg
- CS Fola Esch, an association football club from Esch-sur-Alzette, Luxembourg
- LÉ Fola (CM12), a Ton-class minesweeper of the Irish Naval Service, named after the Irish goddess
