= Folakemi =

- Gender: Female
- Language: Yoruba

Origin
- Origin: Nigeria
- Meaning: Use wealth to pamper me
- Region of origin: Southwest Nigeria

Fọ́lákẹ́mi // is a feminine given name of Yoruba origin, with the meaning "use wealth to pamper me.”

== People with the name Folakemi ==
- Folakemi T. Odedina, Nigerian-born scientist and professor of pharmacy and medicine
- Rofiat Sule (born 2000), born as Rafiat Folakemi Sule, Nigerian footballer

== See also ==
- Adekemi
- Folayemi
- Kemi (given name)
