= Yemi Blaq =

Nigerian film actor

- Born: 1974 (age 51–52); Ondo State, Nigeria
- Education: Adeyemi Demonstration Secondary School
- Occupations: Film actor, model, songwriter
- Children: 1
- Awards: Best Actor in a Leading Role, Africa Magic Viewer's Choice Awards

Yemi Blaq (born 1974; né Folayemi Olatunji,) is a Nigerian film actor, songwriter, and model.

== Early life and education ==
Yemi was born to Mr and Mrs Francis Olatunji in Ondo State, Nigeria. Yemi Blaq was raised in Ondo town, where he attended and completed his primary and secondary education. He attended the prestigious Saint Joseph's college Ondo and then went to Immaculate Heart comprehensive High School Lagos then to Adeyemi Demonstration Secondary School in Ondo, Ondo state, and he was the school’s first Head boy. He started acting during his primary school days and continued till date.

== Personal life and family ==
Remi Ibinola is Blaq's wife. Remi is remarked as an excellent storyteller and writer who has contributed to various Nollywood films featuring her husband. His wife, according to Yemi, "is the best writer in Nollywood".

Blaq and his wife met on the set of the Nollywood film Growing Up. It is not clearly stated when their paths crossed, but one thing eventually resulted in another, and they married in 2008, their 14th year together. Their son is the result of their marriage. Kay, as he is fondly known, was born on October 5, 2007, and is now sixteen years old.

== Career ==
Yemi Blaq started his professional career in Nollywood in 2005. He had registered with the Actors Guild of Nigeria back then in order to be an actor. The first movie that brought him to the limelight was Lost of Lust where he acted alongside Mercy Johnson. After his first movie, he was sought out in the Nigerian movie industry and has since acted in several movies.

== Filmography ==
- The Good Samaritan 2 (2004)
- Without Shame (2005)
- Lost to Lust (2005)
- 11 Days 11 Nights 2 (2005) as Charles
- Traumatised (2006) as Kevin
- Total Control (2006) as Michael
- Sting (2006)
- Mamush (2006)
- Desperate Ambition (2006)
- Letters to a Stranger (2007)
- Sinking Sands (2011) as Dr. Zack Matthew
- The Search (2012) as Kunle
- Strive (2013)
- President for a Day (2014)
- The Last 3 Digits (2015) as Marvin
- It's About Your Husband (2016) as Mr. Essien
- Obsession (2017) as Bayo Davis
- Purgatory (2018) as Chief Priest
- Cultural Clash (2019)
- 12 Noon (completed)
- Shadow Parties (2020) as Owuteru
- Tari's Quest (2021) as Desmond
- Boycott (2022) as Ola
- The Marriage Fixer (2022) as Raymond Tokumbo
- Adire (2023) as Captain
- House of Ga'a (2024) as Aare Ona Kankanfo

== Awards ==
Year	Award	Category	Nominated work	Result	Refs
	Africa Magic Viewer's Choice Awards	Best Actor in a Leading Role	My Idol (Film)	Won	
2018	Best of Nollywood Awards	Best Kiss in a Movie	Obsession	Nominated	
2018	Golden Movie Awards	Golden Supporting Actor		Nominated	
