= Abimbola Amusu =

Nigerian soldier

- Born: Abimbola Olatilewa Amusu
- Allegiance: Nigeria
- Branch: Nigerian Army
- Rank: Major General
- Commands: Nigerian Army Medical Corps
- Education: Lagos State University

Major General Abimbola Olatilewa Amusu is a Nigerian soldier who commanded the Nigerian Army Medical Corps from 2015 to 2018. She was the second female officer in the history of the Nigerian Army Medical Corps to have commanded the corps. She was appointed after the retirement of Major General Obashina Ayodele.

== Career ==
Amusu holds a Master of Business Administration (MBA) (Health Management) from Lagos State University, She is also an examiner with the National Postgraduate Medical College of Nigeria and a Member of Faculty Board; Faculty of Pathology, at the same college. Amusu is at present the authority of the Nigerian Army Medical Corps. She joined the Nigerian Army as a 2nd Lieutenant in June 1982, she was the Director and Chief Consultant Hematologist, 44 Nigerian Army Reference Hospital Kaduna from September 2014 to December before she was made the Medical Corps Commander, an office she held until her retirement in 2018. She retired from the Nigerian Army in December 2018. She was among the two Major Generals and three Brigadier Generals that were pulled out of service at the Nigerian Army Medical Corps in Lagos in 2018.

== See also ==
- Aderonke Kale
