= Corps Marshal (FRSC) =

The corps marshal is the title of the professional head and chief executive of the Federal Road Safety Corps of Nigeria. The corps marshal is appointed by the president with a four-year tenure renewable once. The current corps marshal is Shehu Mohammed.

== List ==
- Major General Anthony Haladu Hannaniya (1994-99)
- Osita Chidoka (June 2007 – June 2014)
- Boboye Oyeyemi (2014 – 24 July 2022)
- Dauda Biu (24 July 2022 – 20 May 2024, acting)
- Shehu Mohammed (since May 20, 2024)

== See also ==
- Inspector General of Police (Nigeria)
- Chief of Defence Staff (Nigeria)
