= New Deal Organization =

Nigerian youth organization

New Deal Organization is a Nigerian non-governmental organization and a project of Daniel Kanu, best known for mobilizing the youth in 1998 with his campaign Youth Earnestly Ask for Abacha. In a similar vein to that campaign, this program focuses on the youth of Nigeria and reaches out to youth and parents, offering moral reorientation. In 2014, the organization began by targeting schools within the Federal Capital Territory in Abuja such as GSS Apo, GSS Garki, GSS Gwarinpa, GSS Karu and GSS Nyanya.

According to News Diary online, the New Deal Organization aims to change the mindset of young people and encourage morality. The New Deal combats violence, drug abuse and other societal vices by addressing parents and children and encouraging a synergy to foster beneficial relationships on the basis that good behavior starts in the home. To enforce this, the New Deal utilizes a two part plan, called Y.A.C.T. and P.A.C.T., respectively.

== P.A.C.T. ==
Parents Against Crime Together (P.A.C.T.) is one of two parts of the New Deal, and calls for parents to bring back family moral values. As part of P.A.C.T., there are ten responsibilities for parents, and the call to sign a social contract with their children.

== Y.A.C.T. ==
Youths against Crime Together (Y.A.C.T.) is the second part of the New Deal, and encourages youth to embrace societal, communal and ethical values. As part of Y.A.C.T., the New deal encourages children to make a social contract and recommitment to their parents.
