= Osita Chidoka =

Nigerian politician and public servant

Osita Benjamin Chidoka

Federal Minister of Aviation of Nigeria
- In office July 2014 – April 2015
- Preceded by: Stella Oduah
- Succeeded by: Hadi Sirika

Corps Marshal of the Federal Road Safety Corps
- In office June 2007 – June 2014
- Preceded by: Anthony Haladu Hannaniya

Personal details
- Born: 18 July 1971 (age 55) Enugu, Nigeria
- Spouse: Chidi Chidoka
- Parent(s): Benjamin Ejikeme Chidoka; Victoria Nneka Chidoka
- Education: University of Nigeria, Nsukka; George Mason University; Oxford University; National University of Singapore
- Awards: Officer of the Federal Republic (OFR)

Osita Benjamin Chidoka (born 18 July 1971) is a Nigerian politician, public servant and administrator. He was Nigeria's Minister of Aviation under President Goodluck Jonathan and also served as Corps Marshal of the Federal Road Safety Corps under President Olusegun Obasanjo.

== Early life and education ==
Chidoka was born in Enugu, Nigeria, to Benjamin Ejikeme Chidoka and Victoria Nneka Chidoka at Charity Maternity Home, Enugu. He had his primary education at Ziks Avenue Primary School in Enugu and St. Vincent De Paul Nursery School in Enugu, and secondary education at Union Secondary School in Enugu between 1982 and 1988. He thereafter proceeded to the University of Nigeria, Nsukka, where he obtained a Bachelor of Science degree in management. He also holds a Masters of Public Policy degree from the School of Public Policy at George Mason University in the United States of America. He has a Certificate in Global Strategy and Political Economy from Oxford University UK, and a Graduate Diploma in Maritime and Ports Management from the National University of Singapore.

== Career ==
Chidoka began his public sector career with the Federal Capital Development Authority in Abuja. Shortly after completing his National Youth Service Corps, he won the National Youth Service Corps FCT Honours Award and gained automatic employment with the Federal Capital Development Authority. As a public servant, he contributed to national development through his services as the Secretary to the National Committee for the visit of Pope John Paul II to Nigeria in 1998, which earned him a papal commendation. He also served as a member of the Committee for the Review of the Abuja Master Plan. Osita also led the Committee for the Drafting of Nigeria's National Policy on Non-Motorized Forms of Transportation and was the Assistant Secretary of the Committee for the Military-Civilian Handover in 1999. He also served as personal assistant to the minister of state in the Federal ministry of Works and Housing, personal assistant to the minister of transport, and special assistant to the senior adviser to the president on legal matters.

After a public sector career, Chidoka joined Mobil Producing Nigeria, a subsidiary of ExxonMobil Corporation, as a senior adviser on government and business relations. In 2007, while serving in this role, President Olusegun Obasanjo appointed him Corps Marshal and Chief Executive of the Federal Road Safety Corps (FRSC).

=== Corps Marshal of the Federal Road Safety Corps (FRSC) ===
Chidoka was appointed by former President Olusegun Obasanjo in 2007 as the Corps Marshal and Chief Executive of the Federal Road Safety Corps (FRSC) at the age of 35, making him the youngest ever to hold the position. His leadership of the FRSC led to the transformation of the Corps into a functional lead agency for road traffic administration and safety management in the country, driven by information and communication technology. Under Osita's leadership, FRSC built a reliable offenders' register and database of drivers and vehicles in the country, leading to ECOWAS' adoption of the Nigerian model in the planned Regional Vehicle Administration Information System for other West African countries. The creation of the Nigeria Road Safety Strategy (2012–2016) was achieved through an all-inclusive process that ensured inter-agency ownership of the process. He also introduced the fully biometric and globally acceptable driver's license, revamped the number plate issuing system making it possible to search and identify vehicle owners on the go and linked to their vehicle insurance and built the ultra-modern number plate production facility in Abuja and Awka as well as a modern world-class Academy in Udi, Enugu State. Budgetary allocation to the agency also increased from ₦6 billion in 2007 to ₦31 billion in 2014. The agency also attracted $10M world bank funding to improve safety on selected corridors and build human capacity through exchange programme with California Highway Patrol and about 100 staff benefitted from the program. FRSC became the first law enforcement agency in Africa to be ISO 9001 Quality Management System certified.

=== Minister of Aviation ===
Chidoka was appointed the Federal Minister of Aviation on 23 July 2014. Prior to his appointment as a federal minister, he chaired the Presidential Committee on Nigeria's Centenary Transportation Subcommittee and was later appointed Chairman of the Transportation Committee for the World Economic Forum, which was held in Nigeria in May 2014. As aviation minister, he initiated several programs to deepen service delivery in the sector. In 2015, he initiated the "one Nigerian pilot in the cockpit" policy for all domestic commercial airlines, aimed at employing Nigerian qualified staff in the aviation industry. He was also responsible for the opening of four new terminals in Lagos, Kano, Abuja and Port Harcourt, which he left at over 80 per cent completion. He also awarded the contract for the runway lighting for 22 airports, including solar lights as redundancy. The Nigerian aviation ministry under him also got the FAA category one certification and commenced the certifications of Nigerian airports.

== Later career ==
In 2017, Chidoka ran for governor of Anambra State, in southeast Nigeria, as a member of the United Progressive Party, but lost to Willie Obiano of the All Progressives Grand Alliance. Chidoka had been one of the founding members of the Peoples Democratic Party.

In 2019, a health outreach initiative was flagged off in his hometown of Obosi, which benefited the 179 communities in Anambra State.

== Personal life ==
Chidoka is married to Chidi Chidoka. His brother, Obinna Chidoka, was a member of the House of Representatives. He is a strong advocate for public policy and has written many articles, essays, and delivered speeches in many areas of public policy and safety management. He writes a regular column, "Bridge Builder," for Leadership Newspaper, where he outlines pragmatic ideas for good governance.

== Awards and recognitions ==
- Traditional title of Ike-Obosi (Strength of Obosi) and a member of Ndi-Ichie, the highest decision-making body of Obosi Traditional Council of Anambra State in May 2009.
- Chartered Institute of Taxation of Nigeria Merit Award on 27 November 2010
- Institute of Logistics Management of Nigeria Fellowship Award in July 2011
- Distinguished Alumnus Award for Good Governance and Model on Road Safety by the Faculty of Social Sciences, University of Nigeria, Nsukka on 12 November 2011.
- Officer of the Order of the Federal Republic, OFR
- Sun and Hallmark Newspapers Public Servant of the Year 2012 awards
- Leadership Newspapers Government Agency of the Year 2012 award
