= 2 Million Man March =

The 2 Million Man March was the culmination of efforts by the group Youth Earnestly Ask for Abacha under the direction of Daniel Kanu. The march took place in Abuja, Nigeria, during 3–4 March 1998.

The support of the former military leader Sani Abacha culminated in 1998 with what is now remembered as the two-million-man march, the largest gathering in history of Nigeria. It was coordinated by YEAA and NACYAN. Africa Research Bulletin reported that YEAA had distributed free exercise books to schools, that it had plans to distribute subsidized imported "Abacha Rice" and that it had bought two new buses, equipped with speakers and modern communications equipment in honor of the event (20 Mar. 1998 13002). Many prominent politicians and other famous Nigerians attended, supported, and spoke at the rally

According to an interview with Daniel Kanu the costs of the rally, estimated at 400-500 million Naira, were paid for by "patriotic individuals" (NTA TV 5 Mar. 1998; Voice of Nigeria 3 Mar. 1998) As alleged in the book Regime Change and Succession Politics in Africa: Five Decades of Misrule, the march was likely government-backed and nearly 2.5 billion Naira was spent on the march. (PG 115 Repressive State and Resurgent Media Under Nigeria’s Military Dictatorship)
