= Daniel Kanu (politician) =

Nigerian politician

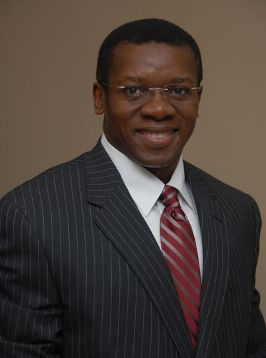
- Born: Daniel Kanu; 20 January 1971 (age 55); Aba, Abia State, Nigeria
- Occupations: Philanthropist, politician, entrepreneur
- Spouse: Kimberley Kanu
- Children: Destiny; Danika; Deandra; Darcy; Sarah; Rachel; Beatrice; Daniel; Obinna; Josephine
- Website: danielkanu.com

Daniel Kanu (born 20 January 1971) is an American-Nigerian politician, entrepreneur and philanthropist. According to a 2014 article in News Diary Online, he became well known throughout Nigeria for his support of General Sani Abacha. He is involved in several businesses in Nigeria and sponsors several organizations dedicated to youth development.

== Early life and education ==
Kanu was born in Aba, Imo State, now Abia State, and was educated in Nigeria until 1985, when he relocated to Texas in the United States. He graduated in 1990 from North Garland High School. In 1991, while studying at University of Oklahoma, he played Defensive End on the Oklahoma Sooners American Football Team. After, he attended Richland College in Dallas, Texas, receiving a certificate in Global Studies on International Business and Trade and a degree in arts. In 1993, he returned to Nigeria.

== Career ==
Kanu began his business career in 1993, when he founded DIK International Limited. The company, together with its subsidiaries, is engaged in areas such as trading, construction, importation and supplying of commodities and technological advanced products, real estate, oil and gas supplies. The government awarded crude oil prospecting license, OPL 244, to his company in 1998. He is also a Managing Director of Cleanall Environmental Services Limited. Kanu is a Chairman of DK Fitness Products Limited.

== Political career ==
Kanu's involvement in Nigerian politics involved him in a number of different political organizations and groups, notably including organizing Youth Earnestly Ask for Abacha (YEAA) and leading 2 Million Man March in support of controversial leader General Sani Abacha, and considered to be the largest gathering in history of Nigeria. In 2002, he won the Peoples Democratic Party (PDP) Primary election for Federal House of Representatives (AMAC and Bwari), but his win was annulled by the PDP due to what they claimed were unverifiable certificates and unclear antecedents. In 2011, Daniel Kanu was appointed Senior Special Assistant (Agriculture and Water Resources) to the Governor of Imo State, Nigeria. Kanu was appointed Special Adviser to the Governor of Imo State, Nigeria, in 2012.

== Philanthropy ==
Kanu is the founder and sponsor of the Daniel Kanu Youth Foundation, which works to promote youth through education and sports. The organization is a core sponsor of the Federal Capital Territory Football Association League in Abuja. In 2014, Daniel Kanu again launched the youth sponsoring New Deal Organization focused heavily on fostering youth development and reducing youth crime. He is also a Founder of Body Builders Association of Nigeria (BBAN)
