= Aderonke Kale =

Nigerian army psychiatrist (1939–2023)

- Born: 31 July 1939; British Nigeria
- Died: 8 November 2023 (aged 84); Nigeria
- Education: St. Anne's School, Ibadan Abeokuta Grammar School University of Ibadan University of London
- Occupation: Army psychiatrist
- Children: 5

Aderonke Kale (31 July 1939 – 8 November 2023) was a Nigerian army psychiatrist who became the first female major-general in the Nigerian Army. She rose to command the Nigerian Army Medical Corps.

== Early life and education ==
Aderonke Kale was born on 31 July 1939 into a Yoruba family. Her father was a pharmacist while her mother was a teacher and they ensured she had good education. Kale went to primary school in Lagos and Zaria and undertook secondary education in St. Anne's School, Ibadan and Abeokuta Grammar School. Kale trained as a medical doctor at University College, which later became the University of Ibadan. Kale then specialized in psychiatry at the University of London. She was inspired to pursue psychiatry by Thomas Adeoye Lambo, Africa's first professor of psychiatry.

== Army career ==
She worked briefly in Britain and returned to Nigeria in 1971. She joined the Nigerian Army in 1972. This was a very rare decision for women in those days, particularly those at such a high professional level. She was a colonel and deputy commander of the Nigerian Army Medical Corps by 1990. She was later promoted to the rank of brigadier-general, becoming the first female general in West Africa. Kale was promoted to major-general in 1994 and became the first Nigerian woman to achieve that rank. She was also the first female major-general in West Africa.

Her role was initially as chief psychiatrist to the army. Kale later became director of the entire Nigerian Medical Corps and was its Chief Medical Officer until 1996. This was the first time in the history of the Nigerian Army that a woman was given responsibility for the healthcare of all Nigerian soldiers at all levels in preparation for and during war. She retired in 1997.

== Personal life ==
Aderonke was married to Oladele Kale, a preventive and social medicine professor. Kale had a son in 1975, Yemi Kale, who became statistician-general of Nigeria. She also has four other children. She provided land for the founding of the Bodija-Ashi Baptist Church in Ibadan. Kale died on 8 November 2023, at the age of 84. President Bola Tinubu described her as a "pioneer in her field" and "a towering figure."

== See also ==
- Abimbola Amusu
