= Mansur Muhtar =

Nigerian politician (born 1959)

Minister of Finance
- In office 17 December 2008 – 17 March 2010
- Preceded by: Shamsuddeen Usman
- Succeeded by: Olusegun Olutoyin Aganga

Personal details
- Born: 21 September 1959 (age 67) Kano, Northern Region, British Nigeria (now, Kano, Kano State, Nigeria)

Mansur Muhtar (born 21 September 1959) is a Nigerian economist who served as Minister of Finance in the cabinet of President Umaru Yar'Adua from 17 December 2008 to March 2010 when acting president Goodluck Jonathan dissolved his cabinet.

== Early life and education ==
Muhtar was born on 21 September 1959, in Kano. He attended King's College, Lagos, and then Ahmadu Bello University, Zaria where he obtained a B.Sc. Economics in 1980. He earned a master's degree in economics and politics of development from the University of Cambridge, United Kingdom in 1983, and a PhD in economics from the University of Sussex, Brighton in February 1988. Muhtar was head of the department of economics and a lecturer at Bayero University, Kano, from 1988 to 1990.

== Career ==
=== Early beginnings ===
Muhtar worked at the Central Bank of Nigeria as an Assistant Economist (1980–81), and as a graduate assistant/assistant lecturer, in 1981 and 1982 at Bayero University, Kano.

Muhtar was special adviser/assistant to the minister of Agriculture and Natural Resources (1990–1992). He worked at the World Bank (1992–2000) in various roles. He was a deputy general manager at the United Bank for Africa between July 2000 and March 2001, and later was executive director at African Development Bank in Tunis.

=== Minister of Finance, 2008–2010 ===
Muhtar was appointed minister of finance in the cabinet of President Umaru Yar'Adua on 17 December 2008. In cabinet reshuffle in 2010, he was replaced.

=== World Bank, 2011–2014 ===
Muhtar served as executive director of the World Bank from 2011 to 2014. His appointment to this full-time position in Washington was a result of the creation of an additional seat for Africa on the board of the World Bank Group; Africa subsequently had three seats on the board from November 2010. Mansur's duties on the board included setting strategic directions and approving policies and programmes of the World Bank Group in the member states, approving internal policies including human resources and oversight of matters related to the functioning of the group's duties.

=== Islamic Development Bank, 2014–present ===
In 2014 Muhtar moved to Jeddah, Saudi Arabia, where he became vice president of country operations of the Islamic Development Bank. In 2023, United Nations Secretary-General António Guterres appointed him as one of 22 members of the Scaling Up Nutrition (SUN) Movement's lead group.
