= Vision 2010 =

Nigerian economic plan

Vision 2010 is a projected economic plan for Nigeria to improve economically. Nigeria is a lesser developed country, whose politics have been shaped by chronic military dictatorships, dependence on oil, ethnic and social cleavages, and a population too large to feed. In the creation of Vision 2010, 248 members developed plans that would hopefully guide the country out of poverty and other national crises. Sub-committees worked on solving key issues needed to be resolved.

In 1996, it was stated that Vision 2010 would "provide the context for further reforms 'which would result in economic recovery and accelerated growth'".

== Areas of Concern ==
Some areas that were of concern included:

- Politics - Stable democracy with a federal system, rule of law, political accountability.
- Economy - Decrease on oil dependence (now over 90% of country's export earnings) and increase in GDP.
- Education - Better educated population (now, only 50% of children between 5 and 24 enrolled in primary, secondary, and higher education).
- Urbanization - Nigeria has a high urban increase rate (5-7%) and growth needs to be managed. Rural development should be stressed.
- Unemployment - very high in Nigeria; recently bankers and doctors have become unemployed.
- Infrastructure (internal framework) - poor electricity, telecommunications, fresh water supply.
- Corruption - a history of military leaders have resulted in corruption for personal gain at the expense of the people. Prebendalism is common for head-of-state military rulers.
- Women inferiority - women generally have greater health problems and less education facilities than men. The literacy rate of adult women is significantly low.

== Solutions ==
- Institute and maintain democratic elections in the Fourth Republic. Nigeria has a history of military dictatorships and coup d'états ending the short-lived republics.
- Increase in private sector to enhance competition.
- Money created should allow for infrastructure to be rebuilt.
- Increased female access to education and job opportunity should raise literacy and equal gender rights.
- Devote over one-quarter of the government's budget to education.
- If better education is promoted, work force can provide for more labor. Criminal activity and violence have resulted from a lack of youth education. New scientific and medicinal advancements can be made with better education systems.

== The Vision in Effect ==
After the blueprints were drawn, implementing these strategies can be difficult. Following Abacha's death in 1998, Abdusalami Abubakar took control as Head of State. General Abubakar endorsed Vision 2010, as he had worked in the formation of the plan. Since 1946, economic plans were introduced but not very successful. There was a lack of discipline in Nigeria to carry out the needs of these plans, so they did poorly. If Vision 2010 hopes to be successful, it will require the nation as a whole to cooperate and take the initiative to look past each other's ethnic differences. To achieve Vision 2010's goals, the government must offer jobs to the people, and the people must take them. Either the entire country unifies, or it will remain poor.

== See also ==
- Nigeria Vision 2020
- National Planning Commission
