= National Institute for Legislative Studies =

Institute in Abuja, Nigeria

The National Institute for Legislative and Democratic Studies (NILDS) is a Nigerian institute with the goal of promoting democracy and best practice legislative activities within Nigeria.

== History ==
The institute was signed into existence by President Goodluck Jonathan on March 2, 2011. The institute was later renamed The National Institute for Legislative and Democratic Studies (NILDS) as per the NILS Act, 2017 signed by President Muhammadu Buhari. Extending the institute to also provide capacity development services.

== Achievements ==
Political developments are particularly significant for the activities of NILDS as an institution of democracy. Democratic governance returned to the country in 1999 against the background of several challenges, one of which was a highly weakened parliamentary institution in Nigeria. NILDS continues to play a crucial role in strengthening legislative capacity in the National Assembly, State Houses of Assembly, National Parliaments and ECOWAS Parliament.

The impact of the capacity building activities of the Institute take a special significance given the high rate of turnover of legislators since 1999. Only 29 out of the 109 Senate members in the Fifth Assembly returned to the Sixth Assembly. Similarly, only about one third of the House's members returned. Indeed, in the last three elections, the proportion of new legislators in NASS averaged 74.5 percent. The situation has not been different in State Houses of Assembly. This very high turnover rate has always informed NILDS' focus on continuous training for legislators to enable them participate meaningfully in their legislative activities including engagement with bills, motions and oversight. In 2015, NILDS successfully organised the Induction of New Legislators (National and State).

The Institute has been meeting all its targets for foreign training programmes and sometimes exceeded its targets for national training programmes for legislators.

Similarly, the Institute's performance in its core operations (routine programmes) has been exceptional as evidenced in its outputs in the following: issue/data/sector briefs; policy analyses; bills analyses, bills tracking, bills were scrutiny, and Bills drafting. Others include drafting motions, occasional papers; briefs of argument/lead debates drafted; Research reports submitted; and other research related activities (including speeches) implemented.

The Institute has consistently worked on developing partnerships, identified new funding opportunities and implemented several capacity building and outreach activities in collaboration with its partners. These included African Capacity Building Foundation (ACBF), United Nations Development Programme (UNDP), UNDP-Democratic Governance for Development (DGD), the Association of European Parliamentarians with Africa (AWEPA), The Partnership for Advocacy in Child and Family Health (PACFaH), UN Women and Konrad Adenauer Stiftung Foundation. The Institute has also established productive relationship with reputable external institutions that include Harvard University, McGill University, International Law Institute (ILI), National Conference of State Legislatures (NCSL), USA, and Johns Hopkins School of International Studies (SAIS), Washington DC, USA, among others.

In 2013, the Institute commenced its postgraduate programmes in affiliation with the University of Benin. The programmes are Master's Degree in: Legislative Drafting; Parliamentary Administration, Legislative Studies, Elections and Party Politics and Post Graduate Diploma in Parliamentary Administration and Elections and Party Management . The Institute also secured NBTE approval and commenced the HND programme in Parliamentary Administration and Official Reporting in 2018. National Assembly staff, legislative aides and others from government ministries and the private sector have benefited immensely from these programmes.

Over the years, the Institute has expanded its sub-regional reach to national parliaments in Africa with the following specific objectives: (i) enhance the capacity of ECOWAS Parliament and NASS to effectively carry out their mandate and responsibilities; (ii) foster learning and sharing experiences and best practices among legislators across ECOWAS countries and (iii) enhance the institutional capacity of NILDS to deliver the legislative capacity building and research services in ECOWAS sub region.

Also, the Institute has achieved an Africa-wide reach through its various international conferences and training programmes. For instance, the first Africa Legislative Summit (ALS) which was organised by the Institute in November 2013 brought together participants from over twenty (20) African countries to discuss the legislature in Africa and its central role to democratic governance. It also identified ways through which governments and parliaments can address the underlying causes of conflict, insecurity, instability and underdevelopment on the continent. In addition to such regional conferences, the Institute has also planned and undertaken trainings and exchange of experience visits for several African parliaments that include Uganda, Somaliland and Ghana. Undoubtedly, NILDS' Africa reach has gained momentum and will need to be further cultivated and sustained.

Policy work is at the heart of the Institute's mandate and NILDS has carried out annual budget analysis for the National Assembly. Equally, the Institute spearheaded the law reform efforts of the National Assembly as well attempts at reforming the country's tax laws to promote the ease of doing business in Nigeria. Similarly, the Institute led the efforts at reforming the budget process in Nigeria through the introduction of a Budget Process Bill. Other policy works of the Institute include research and publications – all of which are designed to supply legislators with accurate, timely and relevant information to aid their legislative functions. Some of these publications include A Century of Lawmaking in Nigeria.

Following the expansion of its mandate and increased demand for its services, the institute expanded its human capacity

Professor Ladi Hamalai, MFR served as the Director General of the Institute from 2011 to 2019.

Professor Abubakar O. Sulaiman, a Professor of Political Science and International Relations, a former Minister for National Planning and Deputy Chairman, National Planning Commission was appointed as the Director General in 2019.

== Publications ==
NILDS has several published research which are available for the general public.
