= Boboye Oyeyemi =

Corp Marshal of FRCC Nigeria

Corps Marshal of the Federal Road Safety Corps
- In office 2014 – 24 July 2022
- Preceded by: Osita Chidoka
- Succeeded by: Dauda Biu (Acting)

Personal details
- Born: Boboye Olayemi Oyeyemi; 26 November 1960 (age 65) Ibadan, Oyo State, Nigeria
- Party: Non-Partisan

Boboye Olayemi Oyeyemi (born 26 November 1960) was Corps Marshal of the Federal Road Safety Corps from July 2014 to July 2022. He was appointed by the President of Nigeria Muhammadu Buhari for second and final term which took effect from 24 July 2018.

== Early life and education ==
Boboye was born in Ibadan but hails from Oke Ero local government area of Kwara State. He attended Baptist Primary School Ibadan, where he got his First Leaving School Certificate in 1975 and Christ High School Ibadan for his West African Senior School Certificate Examination in 1980. In 1983, he got his National Diploma in Electrical engineering and a Higher National Diploma in 1986 both at The Polytechnic, Ibadan. He did Postgraduate Diploma in transport management in 1993 and Master of Public Administration in 1995 both at the University of Lagos. In 2016, he got his Doctorate degree in Public Administration from the University of Nigeria, Nsukka.

== Appointment as Corp Marshal ==
On 23 July 2014, former president Goodluck Jonathan appointed Boboye Oyeyemi as the Corps Marshal and Chief Executive of Federal Road Safety Corps (Nigeria), replacing Osita Chidoka who was appointed Minister of Aviation. On 12 June 2018, President Mohammadu Buhari re-appointed him to serve a second tenure of four years beginning from 24 July 2018.
