= Oluyemi =

- Gender: Male and Female
- Language: Yoruba

Origin
- Origin: Nigeria
- Meaning: The Lord is worthy of me
- Region of origin: South West, Nigeria

Other names
- Short form: Yemi
- Nicknames: Yemo, Yem Yem
- See also: Oluwayemisi

Oluyemi audio is a Nigerian given unisex name of Yoruba origin, which means "The lord is worthy of me or God befits me". Oluyemi is a diminutive form of Yoruba names like "Yemi" which means "befit me". Other full forms of the name include Oluwayemisi (The lord honors me.) or Oluyemisi (The lord honors me.), etc.

== Notable people with the name ==
- Oluyemi Adeniji (1934–2017), Nigerian career diplomat and politician
- Abel Oluyemi Ajibodu, Anglican bishop in Nigeria
- Oluyemi Fagbamila (born 1983), retired Nigerian sprinter
- Oluyemi Kayode (1968–1994), Nigerian sprinter
- Oluyemi Osinbajo (born 1957), Nigerian lawyer, professor, and politician
- Oluyemi Thomas (born 1952), American jazz bass clarinetist
