= Dorcas Idowu =

Cameroonian politician

Nominated Member of the House of Assembly
- In office 1955–1959
- Succeeded by: Josepha Mua

Personal details
- Born: 27 August 1903

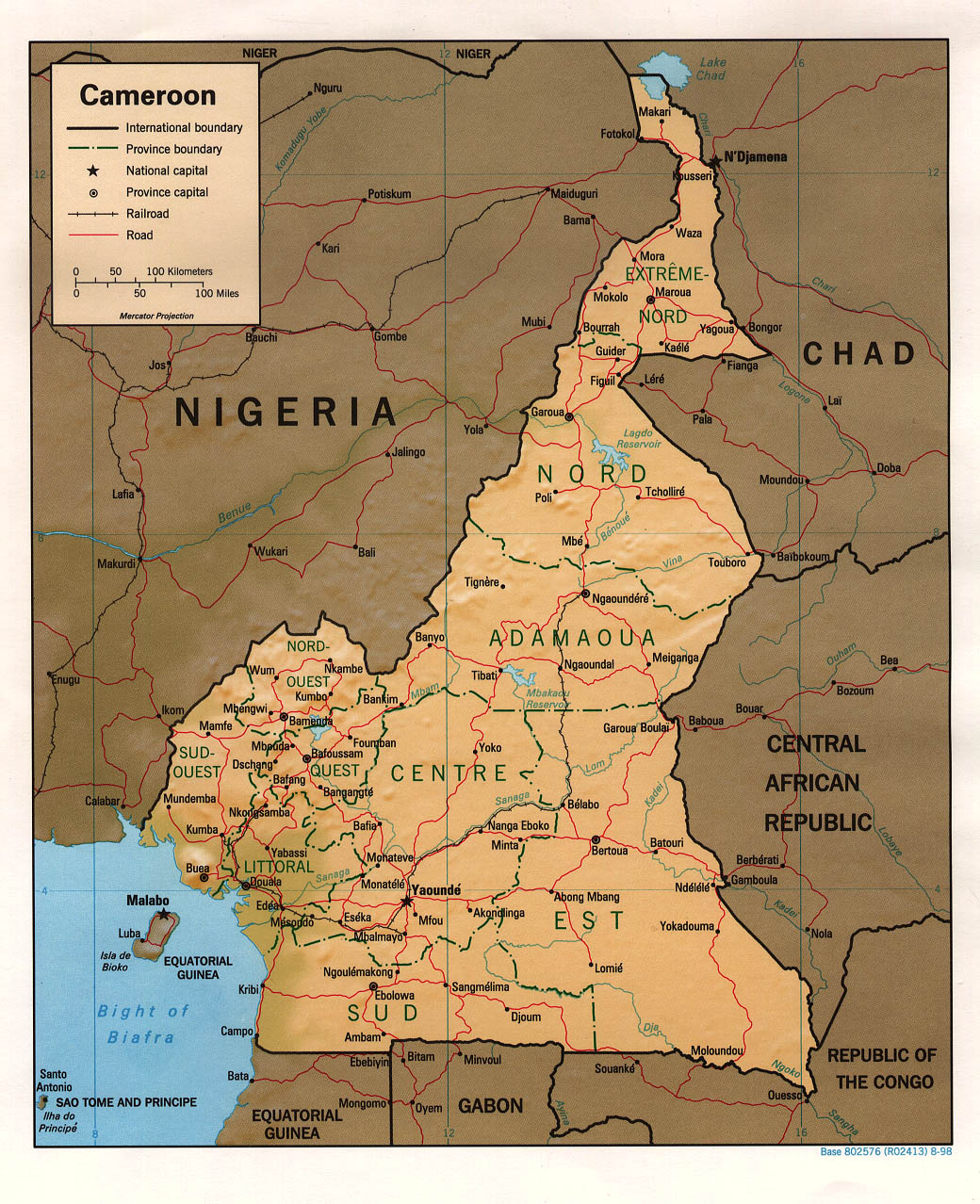
Cameroon Map

Dorcas Ewokolo Idowu (born 27 August 1903) was a Cameroonian politician. She was the first woman to sit in the Southern Cameroons House of Assembly, and the first female parliamentarian in what is now Cameroon.

== Biography ==
Idowu was born in 1903, the daughter of Joseph Lifanjo Ekema. She married Thomas Faguma Idowu and worked as a teacher at the government school in Buea.

A member of the Kamerun National Congress, Idowu was appointed to the Southern Cameroons House of Assembly in July 1955 as a member representing women's interests, becoming the first female parliamentarian in Cameroon. She remained a member until 1959.
