= Ladi Hamalai =

Nigerian academic and public administrator (born 1959)

- Born: September 20, 1959 (age 67); Mubi South, Adamawa State, Nigeria
- Citizenship: Nigerian
- Education: Bayero University, Kano (BSc); University of Wisconsin–Madison (graduate studies); University of Sussex, Institute of Development Studies (PhD)
- Occupations: Academic; Public administrator
- Known for: Pioneer Director-General, National Institute for Legislative and Democratic Studies (2011–2019)
- Awards: Member of the Order of the Federal Republic (MFR)

Ladi Hamalai (born September 20, 1959) is a Nigerian academic who hails from Mubi South Local Government of Adamawa State, Nigeria. She obtained her O level certificate in 1976, and received a bachelor's degree in political science from Bayero University, Kano in 1981.

Ladi Hamalai proceeded to the University of Wisconsin, Madison for a graduate degree in political science in 1985 and proceeded to the Institute of Development Studies at the University of Sussex, Brighton, UK for a doctorate degree in development studies.

== Career ==
- Pioneer Director-General, National Institute for Legislative and Democratic Studies, 2011–2019. The National Institute for Legislative and Democratic Studies is a capacity-building agency of the National Assembly that provides technical services to the legislature and other institutions of democracy in Nigeria.
- Pioneer and Project Coordinator, Policy Analysis and Research Project (PARP), 2004–2010. This program was funded by an Africa Capacity Building Foundation grant for the purposes of building legislative capacity in Nigeria.
- Pioneer Director, Planning, Coordination and Monitoring, Small and Medium Enterprises Development Agency (Presidency), 2003–2004.
- Commandant, Economic and Financial Crimes Commission Academy, 2019–2020.
- Professor Ladi Hamalai held academic positions at various Nigerian institutions between 1988 and 2024, including Baze University, El-Amin University, National Open University of NIgeria, Nigerian Defense Academy, University of Maiduguri, American University of Nigeria, Jubilee University, Taraba State University, University of Benin, and Nasarawa State University.

== Publications ==
Professor Ladi Hamalai has contributed 42 publications on ResearchGate centering around politics, elections, and governance, including:

- Continuity and change in Nigeria's Electoral Democracy
- Democratic Governance and Political Accountability
- Theoretical and Structural Issues in Nigeria Politics
- Economic Liberalization, Political Pluralism and Business Associations in Developing Countries
- Economic liberalization, political pluralism and business associations in developing countries
- Nigerian State Assemblies: A Study of Legislative Activities (2006–2007)

== Activism ==
Hamalai is the founder and chairman of Jakadiya Trust Foundation, a nonprofit working for youth, education, and social change. The foundation started operations in 2020, and has helped Mubi communities improve lives through educational programs focused on poverty alleviation.

== Awards and honors ==
Hamalai was awarded Member of the Order of the Federal Republic (MFR), and was bestowed by the President of the Federal Republic of Nigeria in 2001. She also won the 50 Women of Distinction Award, which was presented by the First Lady of the Federal Republic of Nigeria while commemorating the 50th Anniversary of Nigeria as an independent country in 2014.
