= Abuja Stock Exchange =

Stock exchange in Nigeria

Abuja Stock Exchange (ASE) was a stock exchange incorporated in June 1998 as a public limited liability company that went live in April 2001. It was the first stock exchange in Nigeria to provide electronic trading, clearing and settlement for both the primary market as well as secondary markets. It was set up to trade in equities, unlisted stocks and plain vanilla bonds.

Soon after its launch a government notification forced it to close its operations. This was orchestrated by the more powerful Nigerian Stock Exchange which lobbied with the government to maintain its monopoly over the Nigerian stock markets. The reasoning for the notification was that there was no need for a second stock exchange in the country.

However, efforts are currently on to convert the existing infrastructure into a multi-commodity exchange commodities exchange.

== See also ==
- Stock exchange
