= Nigerian Army Medical Corps =

Medical administrative corps of the Nigerian Army

- Active: 1956—1960 (as Nigerian Military Medical Service); Since 1960 (as Nigerian Army Medical Corps)
- Country: Nigeria
- Branch: Nigerian Army
- Garrison/HQ: Victoria Island, Lagos
- Website: https://namc.army.mil.ng

Commanders
- Commander: Brigadier General I.A. Enwuchola

The Nigerian Army Medical Corps (NAMC) is an administrative corps of the Nigerian Army tasked with medical functions. It is responsible for "general health matters in the Army". The NAMC was created in 1956 and adopted its current name in 1960. It has been involved in various wars, peacekeeping missions, and disaster response.

== History ==
Medical services to the West Africa Command of the British Army were provided by the West African Army Medical Corps (WAAMC), a division of the Army Medical Services. This continued during World War II. The WAAMC continued to provide such services until 1956— as African nations in the region were becoming independent; Nigeria became independent in 1960—when the Nigerian Military Medical Service (NMMS) was made an independent organisation, headquartered at Apapa. Most of the WAAMC doctors had been foreigners, and they were gradually withdrawn from the country in the years leading up to independence. In 1960, it was renamed the Nigerian Army Medical Corps.

Upon independence, the corps had a military hospital in Kaduna and in Lagos, and a total of less than 100 beds. In 1964, A. O. Peters was made the first medical commander of the corps. Unrest in the lead-up to the Nigerian Civil War in 1966 led to the establishment of a wider Armed Forces Medical Services, which oversaw the expansion of the two hospitals and the development of several more. On 22 June 1966, H. E. Adefop was made director of army medical services. When the Nigerian Civil War broke out on 6 July 1967, the corps was expanded further, including the establishment of training facilities. The army eventually had five military hospitals. During the war, the NAMC grew and gained experience.

In 1971 the first woman was commissioned into the NAMC, and by 1994 there were seven female doctors in the corps. The corps has also been involved in various peace-keeping and disaster response missions. It participated in United Nations missions in Yugoslavia. It provided support during the Second Liberian Civil War and the Sierra Leone Civil War.

== Present day ==
By 2008, the corps had seven military hospitals (300 beds each), three larger 500 bed hospitals, various smaller sections, and a hospital jointly administered between the Nigerian Army, Nigerian Navy and Nigerian Air Force. In 2014 it was reported that members of the NAMC were striking due to their salaries not being paid. In 2018, the Nigerian Army announced a restructuring of the medical corps and an overhaul of hospitals. The corps took measures in March 2020 to prevent the spread of COVID-19 in Nigeria.

== Structure ==
=== Directorates ===
- HQ
- Directorate of Field and Curative Medicine
- Directorate of Dental Services
- Directorate of Pharmaceutical Services
- Directorate of Professions to Allied Medicine
- Directorate of Nursing Services

=== Units ===
- 44 Nigerian Army Reference Hospital, Kaduna
- 68 Nigerian Army Reference Hospital, Yaba
- Military Hospital Benin
- Military Hospital Port Harcourt
- 1 Division Medical Services and Hospital, Dalet Barracks
- 2 Division Medical Services and Hospital, Adekunle Fajuyi Cantonment, Akinyele
- 3 Division Medical Services and Hospital
- 6 Division Medical Services and Hospital, Port Harcourt
- 7 Division Medical Services and Hospital, Maiduguri
- 8 Division Medical Services and Hospital, Sokoto
- 81 Division Medical Services and Hospital
- 82 Division Medical Services and Hospital

== Leadership ==
- Austen Peters (May 1964 – June 1966)
- H.E.O Adefope (June 1966 – May 1975)
- E.W.O Thomas (May 1975 – Nov 1975)
- J.U Ekong (Nov 1975 – Jan 1984)
- A Rimi (Jan 1984 – Jan 1988)
- M.A.T Ajao (Jan 1988 – Sep 1990)
- J.k Oye (Sep 1990 – Sep 1994)
- Aderonke Kale (Sep 1994 – Apr 1996), the first female commander
- J.N Ulasi (Apr 1996 – Jul 1998)
- B.E Abang (Jul 1998 – Nov 1998)
- A Adefolalu (Nov 1998 – Jan 2004)
- B.E Abang (Jan 2004 – Dec 2006)
- I.S Ejeh (Jan 2007– May 2009)
- H.M.A Agada (Jun 2009 – Feb 2011)
- S.O Ameh (Feb 2011 – Apr 2014)
- A.V Okpobrisi (Apr 2014 – Jun 2014)
- O.A Ogunbiyi (Jun 2014 – Dec 2015)
- Abimbola Amusu (Dec 2015 – Jul 2017) the second female to lead the corps
- C.B Wanda (Jul 2017 – Jan 2018)
- Ikechukwu Okeke (Jan 2018 — Feb 2019)
- S.J Adama (Feb 2019 – June 2020)
- I.B Solebo (June 2020 – Feb 2023)
- Samson Okoigi (Feb 2023 – Oct 2025)
- I.A Enwuchola (Oct 2025 – Present)
