= News Diary =

Nigerian online newspaper

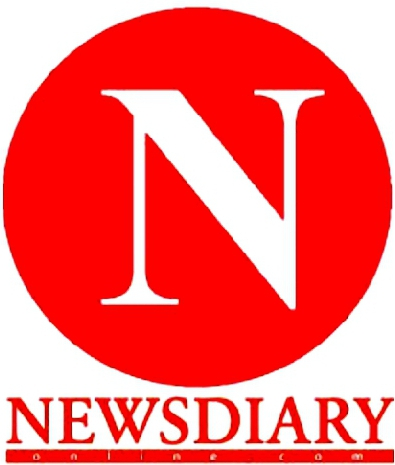
- Type: Daily online
- Format: Online content
- Owner: NewsDiary Group Limited
- Founder: Newdiarly Group Limited
- Publisher: NCL
- Editor-in-chief: Mr Danlami Nmodu
- Managing editor: Danlami Nmodu
- Founded: 2009
- Language: English
- Headquarters: Abuja
- Website: newsdiaryonline.com

The News Diary is a daily online newspaper in Abuja, Nigeria published by Newsdiary Communication Limited (NCL).

== About ==
The News Diary was founded by Newsdiary Group Limited in 2009 as online news content, the NGL was founded by Danlami Nmodu, a columnist who was also publisher in TheNEWS and Tempo magazine.

In 2015, the head office in Abuja was burgled by unknown people in aspect to some vita information and office useful items were stolen said by chief-editor Danlami Nmodu.

== DSS Nigeria ==
In December 2019 the Department of State Services (DSS) boss Yusuf Magaji Bichi, invited the chief-editor of Newsdiary Mr Danlami Nmodu on a phone call to their headquarters in Abuja over a recent leaked publication of a story title Diplomatic backlash, legal tussle looms as Federal Government dumps German firm over Kano project on ecological funds projects in Kano after the published story the secretary to the state government office and head Boss Mustapha hits with available fact that clarify the issue and the newspaper had participate on Challawa, Sharaba and Bompai ecological projects of $7.5 million in Kano State the department of state services quoted to know how it was leaked.
