= Folakemi T. Odedina =

Nigerian-born scientist

Folakemi Titilayo Odedina (born January 21, 1965) is a Nigerian-born scientist and professor of pharmacy and medicine at the University of Florida. She is the principal investigator for the Prostate Cancer Transatlantic Consortium (CaPTC), a clinical research group using genomic science and environmental etiology to explore disproportionate burden of prostate cancer among Black men funded by the NCI. She is a member of American Cancer Society's National Prostate Cancer Disparities Advisory Team.

== Early years ==
Odedina was born on January 21, 1965, in Abeokuta, Ogun State, Nigeria to Ezekiel Shotayo Badejogbin and Grace Modupe Badejogbin. She spent her early childhood in Lagos and schooled at the Apostolic Church Primary School and Methodist Girls High School, Lagos.

== Education ==
Odedina obtained her Bachelor of Science in pharmacy at the Obafemi Awolowo University (OAU), Ile-Ife (formerly known as University of Ife) in 1986. She started a doctoral program in Pharmaceutical Sciences at the University of Florida in 1990 and earned her PhD in 1994. Her thesis was titled "Implementation of Pharmaceutical Care in Community Practice: Development of a Theoretical Framework for Implementation".

== Career ==
After earning her PhD, Odenina joined West Virginia University as an assistant professor. She then served as professor of Medicine and Pharmacy at the Department of Radiation Oncology and the Department of Pharmacotherapy & Translational Research of the University of Florida before accepting a position as the Enterprise Deputy Director, Community Outreach and Engagement at the Mayo Clinic Comprehensive Cancer Center.

She is also the Program Director of Florida-California Cancer Research, Education and Engagement (CaRE2) Health Equity Center- a National Cancer Institute funded U54 award. Her scientific works focused on genetic, environmental determinants of prostate cancer disparity. She also researched on understanding the predictor of health-care disparities among Black men and exploration of behavioral interventions to improve the issues. She has led over 30 research projects prostate cancer disparities. In 2006, she received the Fulbright Specialists Program to assess cancer data reporting system in Nigeria. She conducted the first national cancer research project on cancer data reporting system in Nigeria and was one of the leading authors of the Nigeria's first National Cancer Control Plan (NCCP).

Odedina has mentored over 300 African scientists. She is the Chair of the Research Committee for the African Organisation for Research and Training in Cancer (AORTIC). In 2017, she was awarded Carnegie African Diaspora Fellowship to work on prostate cancer risk and the development of oncology clinical trial virtual platforms at the University of Cape Town.

In an interview with SciDev in 2020, Odedina said that she experienced gender discrimination, when a female professor told her that she would not be able to finish her graduate programme because of marriage and pregnancy during her graduate school.

She is the principal investigator of Prostate Cancer Transatlantic Consortium (CaPTC), a United States National Institute of Health/National Cancer Institute funded consortium that has over 50 institution members and research sites in Africa, Europe, North America and the Caribbean.

In 2025, Odedina participated in the Prostate Cancer Transatlantic Consortium's 20th anniversary meeting in Lagos, where she discussed developing the consortium's next generation of African scientists, clinicians, and advocates.

== Awards and honors ==
- 1996 Honorable mention for Innovative Teaching, American Association of Colleges of Pharmacy
- 1997 Pharmacy Practice Research Award, American Society of Health-System Pharmacists
- 1997 Who's Who in Science and Engineering 4th Edition, Who's Who in Science and Engineering
- 1998 HBCU Faculty Award in Cancer Research, American Association for Cancer Research
- 1999 Best Published Paper, American Pharmacists Association
- 2000 Dean's Appreciation Award, College of Pharmacy & Pharmaceutical Sciences, Florida A&M University
- 2001 Honorable mention, American Association of Colleges of Pharmacy Innovative Teaching, American Association of Colleges of Pharmacy
- 2001 Dean's Appreciation Award, College of Pharmacy & Pharmaceutical Sciences, Florida A&M University
- 2002 HBCU Faculty Award in Cancer Research, American Association for Cancer Research
- 2004 Community Service Award, Florida A&M University
- 2004 Fellow, Cancer, Culture and Literacy Institute, H. Lee Moffitt Cancer Center
- 2004 Research and Publication Achievement Award, American Society of Health-System Pharmacists-Association Of Black Health System Pharmacists
- 2005 Minority Access Role Model Award, Insight into Diversity magazine
- 2005 TEAM Award winner, Reaching Out to the Community: Diversity Initiative, H. Lee Moffitt Cancer Center & Research Institute
- 2005 Role Model Citation Award, Minority Access, Inc.
- 2006 Fulbright Scholar, Cancer Control in West Africa, U.S. Department of State Fulbright Research Program
- 2007 MSI Faculty Award in Cancer Research, American Association for Cancer Research
- 2008 Researcher of the Year Award, Florida A&M University
- 2009 Prostate Cancer Scientist Award, National Association of Yoruba Descendants in North America
- 2009 Leadership Award for Health Disparities, American Society of Health-Systems Pharmacy and the Association of Black Health-System Pharmacists
- 2012 Who is Who in North America Education
- 2015 Education and Service Award, CMS Old Grammarians Society
- 2016 Inspiring Women in STEM Award, Insight Into Diversity magazine
- 2017 Living Legend Award, 1st All Africa Clinical Trial Summit
- 2017 Williams Award for Innovation in Cancer Care, African Organization for Research and Training in Cancer
- 2017 Carnegie African Diaspora Fellowship Program (Nigeria), Institute of International Education
- 2018 Carnegie African Diaspora Fellowship Program (Alumni Award, South Africa), Institute of International Education
- 2020 Global Women in Research Spotlight, Civilian Research and Development Foundation
- 2023 AACR Distinguished Lectureship on the Science of Cancer Health Disparities, American Association for Cancer Research
