= Yemi Abiodun =

English footballer

Personal information
- Full name: Ayodeji Opeyemi Adiodun
- Date of birth: 29 December 1980 (age 45)
- Place of birth: Clapton, England
- Height: 5 ft 10 in (1.78 m)
- Position: Striker

Youth career
- –1997: Millwall
- 1997–1999: Norwich City

Senior career*
Years	Team	Apps	(Gls)
1999–2001	Southend United	3	(0)
2001	Chesham United		
2001	Harrow Borough		
2001	Dulwich Hamlet		
2001	Enfield		
2001–2002	Maidenhead United		
2002–2003	Welling United		
2003	Ford United		
2003	Hampton & Richmond Borough		
- * Club domestic league appearances and goals

Ayodeji Opeyemi "Yemi" Abiodun (born 29 December 1980) is an English retired professional footballer who played as a striker.

== Career ==
Born in London, Abiodun played youth football with Millwall and Norwich City. He signed a professional contract with Southend United in June 1999, making his first team debut in August 1999. Abiodun left Southend in January 2001, having made three league appearances for the side. Abiodun had short spells with a number of non-league clubs, including Chesham United, Harrow Borough, Dulwich Hamlet, Enfield, Maidenhead United, Welling United, Ford United and Hampton & Richmond Borough.
