= Oluwakemi Adejoro Ojo =

Nigerian actress

- Other names: Kemi Korede
- Citizenship: Nigeria
- Occupations: Film actress, tv presenter, producer
- Years active: 2006–present

Oluwakemi Adejoro Ojo, popularly known as Kemi Korede is a Nigerian Actor, TV presenter producer as well as and MC. She is usually seen in Yoruba films. Oluwakemi alongside Toyin Alausa was signed into the Honeyglow skin care in 2021 by the CEO of the brand.

== Early life and education ==
For tertiary education, she studied nursing.

== Career ==
Kemi Korede started acting right from secondary school but came into the limelight in 2006 starring in the movie, Omobewaji

== Filmography ==
- Ile Olorogun
- Afi ibi Solore
- Obo Iyi
- Satan's Bride
- Oju Ade
- Omo Aye
- Omobewaji
- Ignorance
- Wemimo
- Ojoor
- Khafila
- Current Alhaja
- Abo Oja

== Personal life ==
Kemi is married with three children.

== See also ==
- Funke Akindele
- Aderounmu
- Nkechi Blessing Sunday
