= Nigeria Vision 2020 =

Logo of the Nigeria Vision 2020

Nigeria Vision 2020 (also stylized as NV2020) was a strategic framework for the Federal Republic of Nigeria to develop its economic and political strength to the point by 2020, “Nigeria will be one of the 20 largest economies in the world, able to consolidate its leadership role in Africa and establish itself as a significant player in the global economic and political arena.”

== Concept ==
Nigeria’s economic potential is well recognized. It is the biggest economy in the West African sub region. Given the country's considerable resource endowment and coastal location there is potential for strong growth. Previous efforts at planning and visioning were not sustained. The history of economic stagnation, declining welfare and social instability, has undermined development for most of the past 30 years.

But in recent years, Nigeria has been experiencing a growth turnaround and conditions seem right for launching onto a path of sustained and rapid growth, justifying its ranking amongst the N11 countries. These are the countries identified by Goldman Sachs to have the potential for attaining global competitiveness based on their economic and demographic settings and the foundation for reforms already laid.

The previous administration had declared the intention to pursue the vision of placing Nigeria among the 20 largest economies in the world by 2020 and the current administration is committed to the attainment of this vision.

== Special Interest Groups ==
In order to ensure that all stakeholders across the sectors participate in the Nigeria Vision 2020 processes, thereby guaranteeing peoples' ownership, which is a precondition for any successful development planning, ten Special Interest Groups were formed and tasked with the responsibility of developing Vision documents which cater to and focus on each group.

The Special Interest Groups are:

- Women
- People with Disabilities
- Media
- Labour
- Youth

== Institutional Arrangement ==
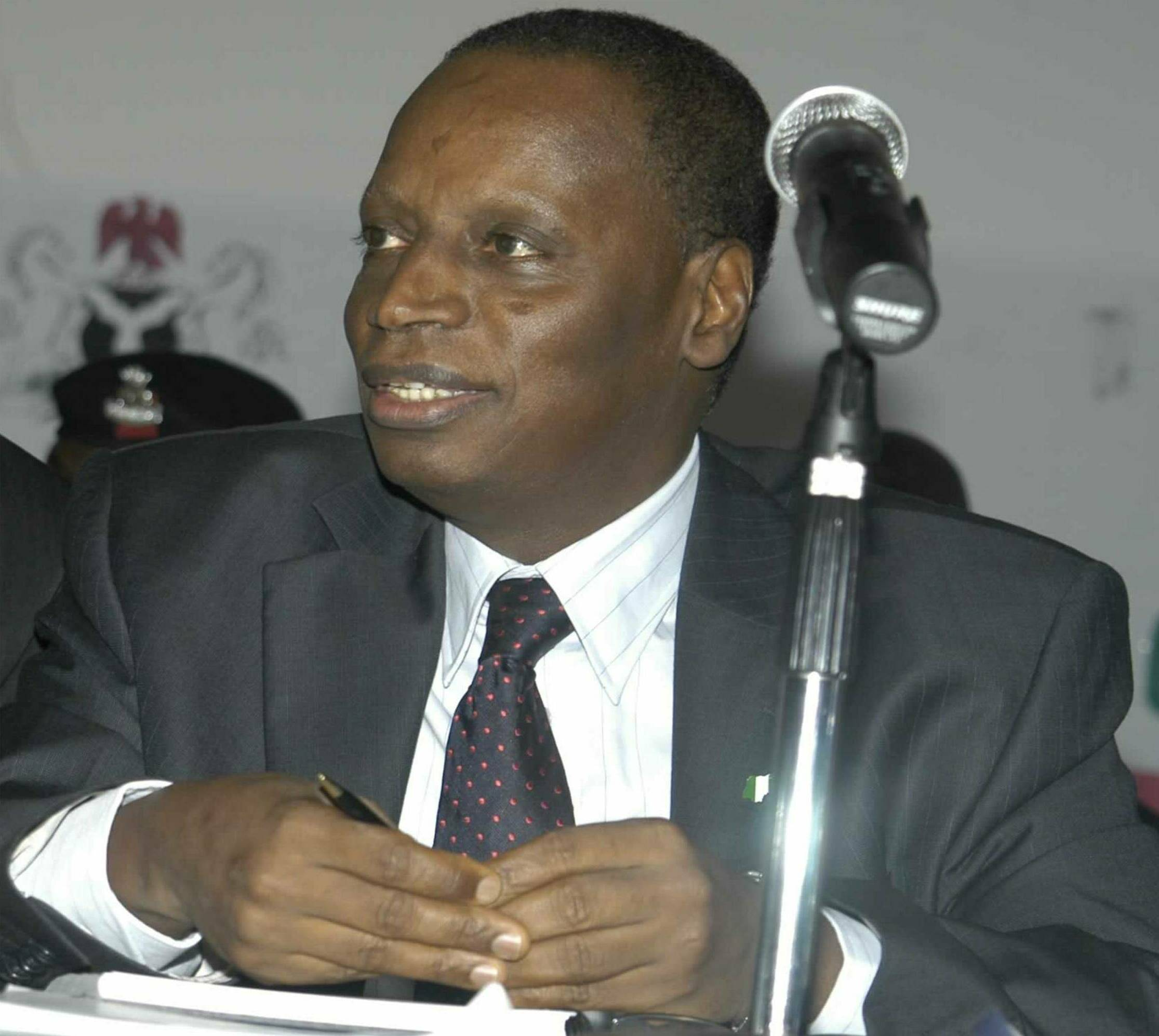
Shamsuddeen Usman, current Minister of National Planning and Deputy Chairman of the National Planning Commission of Nigeria

The main organs responsible for the development of the Vision 2020 are;

- The National Council on Vision 2020 is at the apex, providing leadership and direction to galvanize the whole nation, with the President as the chairman.
- The National Steering Committee consists of about 70 persons, drawn from the public and private sector, with responsibility for developing the Vision 2020 Implementation Guidelines, Monitoring and Evaluation (M&E) strategy, ensuring a bottom-up approach by which all key stakeholders, Ministries, Departments and Agencies (MDAs) as well as State, Local Government Areas (LGAs) are encouraged to prepare and implement their “component of the V2020”. The NSC will also develop a template for preparing the V2020 strategic plan.
- National Technical Working Group will comprise 20-25 experts in specified thematic areas drawn from both public and private sectors with expertise and passion for the area. They will undertake specific studies or research work to provide data necessary for the working groups report.
- The Stakeholder Development Committee includes State Governments, Federal Ministries, Departments and Agencies (MDAs) and other key institutions. The Nigeria Vision 2020 is a bottom-up strategic plan in which each major stakeholder group will prepare its V2020 thoughts and ideas based on the guidelines approved by the National Council. These Committees are expected to provide information that will feed into the NV2020 Plan.
- The Economic Management Team will serve as Think-Tank to drive the visioning process. The chairman and Vice Chairman of the EMT are members of the National Council and National Steering Committee on Vision 2020 as well as provide the vital link and feedback from both directions between the National Council and the National Steering Committee. They will therefore provide the vital link and feedback from both bodies.

== Development Process, Methodology & Milestones ==
The Vision document is to be developed in the following stages:

- STAGE I: BUILDING A SOLID FOUNDATION FOR V2020 (2008–2010)

In this stage the first two components of the framework- the NCV2020 and the NSCV2020, should be established by the end of April 2007. The NSC2020 should undertake an immediate review of all current strategy and related documents including the President's Seven Point Agenda, the NEEDS 2 and other relevant documents and prepare a Statement of National Priorities that will form the core elements of the country's development plans and budgets during the period 2008 to 2010 and constitute the foundation for V2020. The Statement of National Priorities should set specific targets to be achieved by 2010. The NSCV2020 will also refine the V2020 framework and develop guidelines for the V2020 development process.

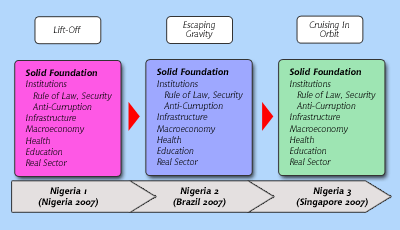
Stages of the Vision 2020 development process

- STAGE II: ACHIEVING THE MDGs ENROUTE TO V2020 (2011 – 2015)

By end of January 2008 the NSCV2020 will set up the National Technical Working Groups, one in each of the key areas of national priority and all stakeholder groups will establish their Vision 2020 Committees.

Under the overall direction of the NSC, the NTWGs will work closely with the Stakeholder Visioning Committees to develop detailed action plans and implementation strategies and commence implementation of Stage I of the Vision. At the same time Stakeholder Committees will begin the development of the next two stages of their Vision document.

Stage II should focus on achieving all the MDGs by 2015 as a general guide. Stakeholder Committees will determine their areas of focus in accordance with their progress on the MDGs.

- STAGE III: BECOMING A TOP 20 ECONOMY BY 2020 (2015 – 2020)

In stage III, the National Steering Committee will develop detailed key goals and targets that must be met in order to achieve convergence with the projected positions of the top 20 economies. These goals and targets will be cascaded into sectors and sub-national levels.

The NTWGs will provide support in the form of data and methodologies as well as capacity building in their areas of specialty. They will also collate and harmonize the various stakeholder action plans and strategies into the National action plan and strategy for NV2020.

== Business Support Group ==
The Business Support Group is an initiative of the Secretariat of the National Steering Committee of Vision 2020, which is intended to engender Private Sector support for the NV2020 process. The Business Support Group is headed by Umaru Mutallab. The key functions of the Business Support Group are to:

- Generate publicity, public opinion, and national buy-in.
- Mobilize resources from the private sector
- Organize fundraising activities to support NV2020;
- Provide technical and financial support
