= John Oyeyemi Fawole =

Nigerian chess player (born 1985)

Personal information
- Born: 4 March 1985 (age 41) Ile-Ife, Osun State

Chess career
- Country: Nigeria
- Title: FIDE Master (2016)
- Peak rating: 2214 (August 2014)

John Oyeyemi Fawole (born 4 March 1985, in Ile-Ife, Osun State) is a Nigerian chess player. He won the Nigerian Chess Championship in 2013 and has a FIDE (World Chess Federation) peak rating of 2214. He held the title of Nigeria National Chess Champion Junior and Open in 2003 and 2013 respectively. Fawole is a FIDE Certified Chess in Education Lecturer, FIDE Instructor, US National Master and US District Coach.

In 1998, he learned how to play chess and participated in his first chess tournament in 1999. In 2002, he won the Open II category of the NBL Chess Championship in Lagos. The following year, he became the National Junior Chess Champion by winning the Agusto & Co Under‑20 Chess Championship. Following his achievement in 2003, he started playing in the Masters Category, the highest level in Nigerian chess. Fawole is Nigeria's 11th Junior Chess Champion and Nigeria's 36th National Chess Champion.

Fawole is the founder of BruvsChess Media, a platform dedicated to promoting chess news and activities across Africa and beyond. He later helped to establish BruvsChess Educational Services (also known as BruvsChess Academy), which provides chess education programmes for schools, students and families in Abuja and in several Nigerian states. In 2017, he helped introduce chess to children at an Internally Displaced People's (IDP) Camp in Gwarinpa, Abuja, in partnership with a local non‑governmental organisation.

Fawole has worked as a chess coach and trainer in Nigeria and abroad, including the United Kingdom, Canada and the United States, and has coached in both school and club environments. He has represented Nigeria in international competitions and has played in open tournaments in Africa, Europe and North America.

In 2025, Fawole founded the Albany Chess Center, a chess instruction and events venue in Albany, New York, which offers classes, tournaments and community programmes for players of all ages. Local coverage has described the centre as a hub for chess in New York's Capital Region.

Fawole is the convenor of the annual John Fawole Chess Awards, also known as the Nigeria Chess Awards, established in 2016 to recognise outstanding achievements in Nigerian chess.
