= National Bureau of Statistics, Nigeria =

Nigeria's principal government institution in charge of statistics and census data

National Bureau of Statistics
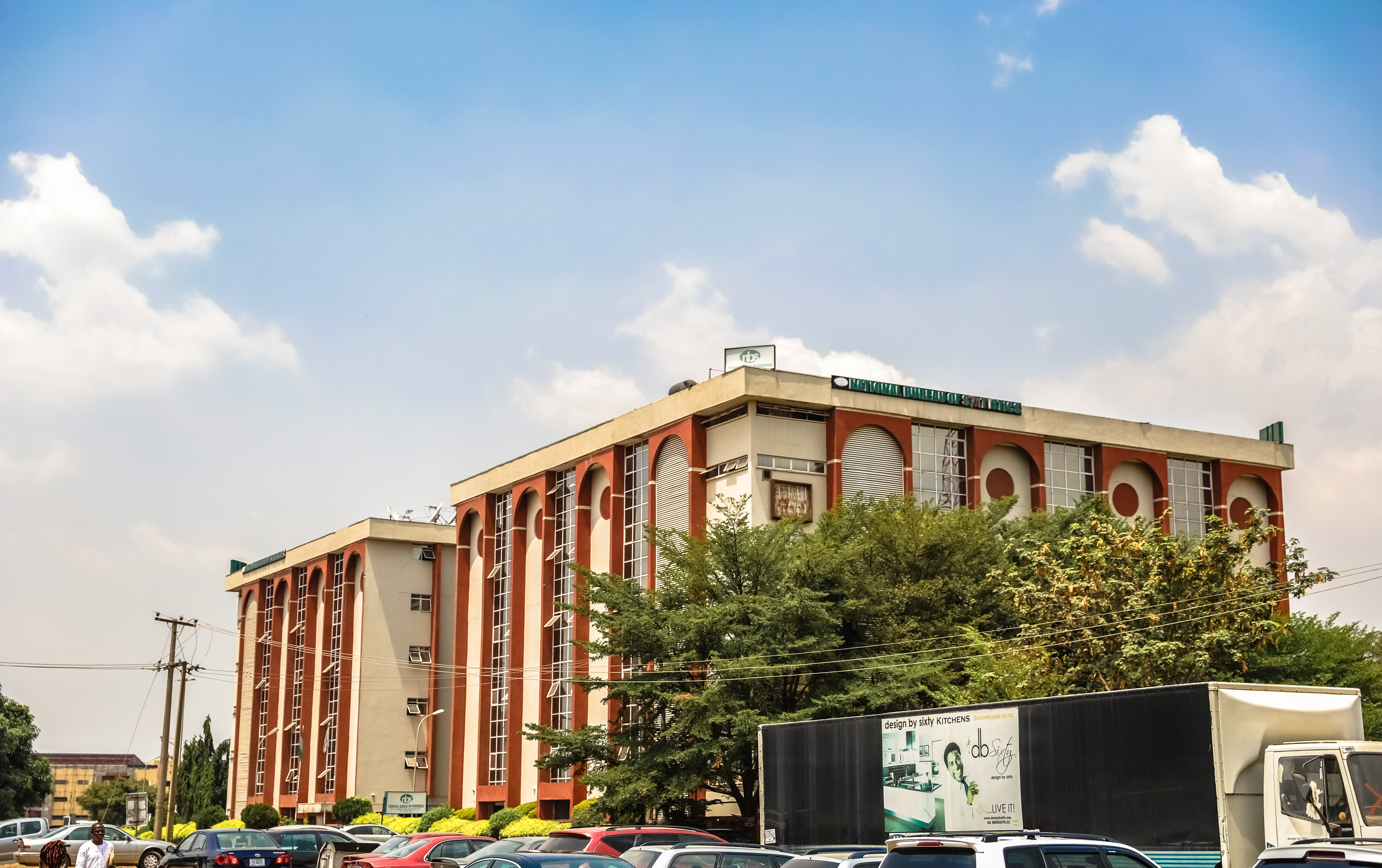

Agency overview
- Website: www.nigerianstat.gov.ng

The National Bureau of Statistics oversees and publishes statistics for Nigeria.

== Contributing Bureaus ==
The contributing bureaus are where the National Bureau of Statistics get their information. They include:

- National Planning Commission
- Economic and Financial Crimes Commission
- Federal Ministry of Health
- National Population Commission
- Nigerian Stock Exchange
- Nigerian Embassies and High Commissions
- Federal Ministry of Finance
- Central Bank of Nigeria
- Nigerian National Petroleum Corporation
- Nigerian Electricity Regulatory Commission

== Some Statistics for Q2, 2009 ==
- Telecommunications / Postal Service is accountable for 3.87% of the GDP
- Manufacturing is accountable for 3.95% of the GDP
- Building & Construction is accountable for 1.94% of the GDP
- Crude Petroleum & Natural Gas is accountable for 16.01% of the GDP
- Agriculture is accountable for 43% of the GDP
- Non-oil Growth was about 8.27%
