= Fola (name) =

- Language: Yoruba

Origin
- Word/name: Nigeria

Pronunciation

Fola is a Yoruba name from Nigeria.

== Notable people ==
- Fola David, Nigerian medical doctor
- Fola Evans-Akingbola, British actress
- Fola Francis, transgender model
- Fola Okesola, British boxer
- Folarin Odunlami, Nigerian singer-songwriter know professionally as Fola
- Fola Onibuje, Nigerian footballer
- Samuel Fola, politician
- Fola La Follette, American actress, activist, editor/author
