= Yemi Idowu =

Nigerian entrepreneur, industrialist and philanthropist

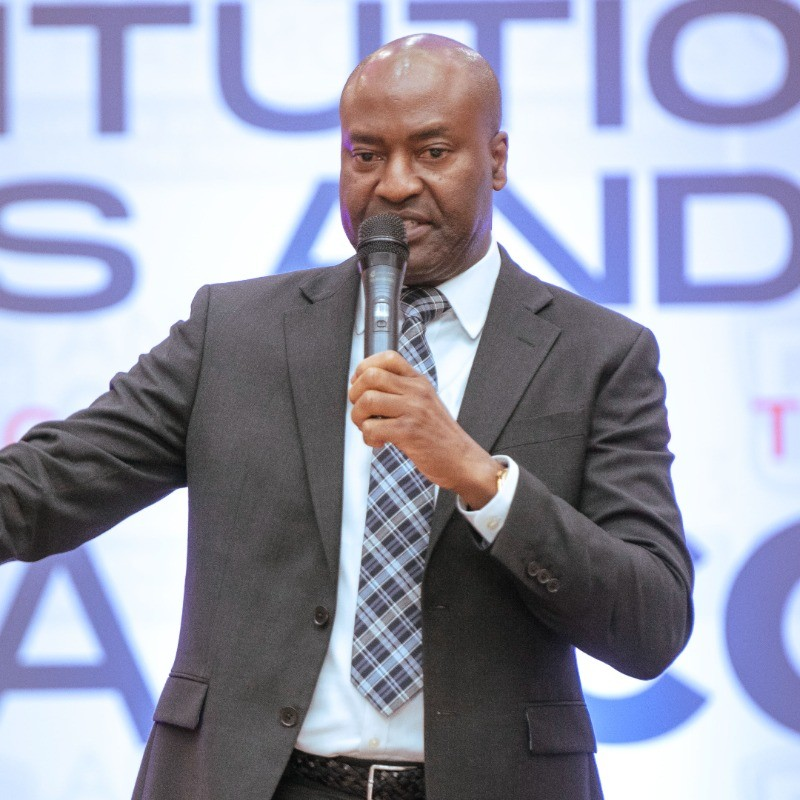
- Idowu addressing an audience (2024)
- Born: 3 December 1968 (age 57); Nigeria
- Occupations: Entrepreneur, Philanthropist, Sports Development Advocate
- Known for: Founder of Nathaniel Idowu Foundation, Chairman of Nathaniel Boys FC, Real Estate Development
- Parent: Nathaniel O. Idowu (father)

Chief Yemi Idowu (born 3 December 1968) is a Nigerian entrepreneur, philanthropist, and sports development advocate. He is the founder of the Nathaniel Idowu Foundation and the current Patron of the Nigeria School Sports Federation (NSSF). Idowu is primarily involved in the real estate, banking, and manufacturing sectors. Through his foundation and advocacy roles, he is known for his work in developing grassroots sports infrastructure, youth development, and health initiatives in Nigeria. He previously served as vice chairman of the federal government's Football Masterplan Development Committee.

== Early life and education ==
Yemi Idowu was born on 3 December 1968. He is the son of the late Chief Nathaniel O. Idowu, the Okanlomo & Aare Maye of Ibadan, who was an industrialist and a philanthropist focused on health and sports.

Idowu earned a Bachelor of Science degree in Accounts and Financial Analysis from the United Kingdom. He holds a Postgraduate Diploma (PGD) in Human Resource Management and is an alumnus of the Harvard Business School Executive Education Program.

== Business career ==
=== Financial Sector ===
Idowu held various senior positions in Nigeria's banking sector. He served as the vice chairman of NBM Bank between 1999 and 2005. Following the consolidation of the bank to form Sterling Bank (Nigeria) PLC, he served as a non-executive director until July 2014 and was a one-time chairman of Sterling Capital Markets. Between 2009 and 2014, Idowu was the General Secretary of the governing council of the Bank Directors Association of Nigeria (BDAN).

=== Real Estate Development ===
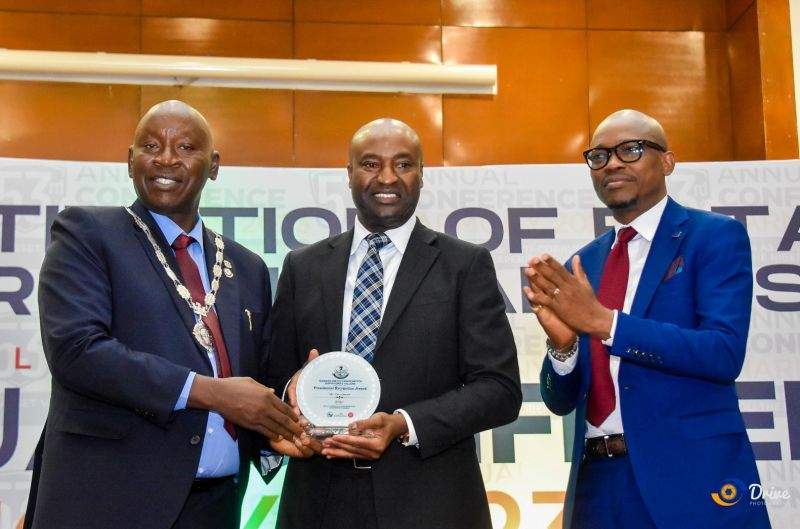
Yemi Idowu Receives Award for Real Estate Personality of the Year - City People Magazine, 2018

Since 1992, Idowu has led a property development company responsible for developing fully serviced residential estates in Lagos. These projects include Northern Foreshore Estate, Friends Colony Estate, Napier Gardens Estate, Milverton Estate, and Bourdillon Court Estate.

In July 2018, he received the Real Estate Personality of the Year award. In February 2024, he was inducted as a Fellow of the Nigerian Institution of Estate Surveyors and Valuers (NIESV).

=== Other Ventures ===
Idowu is the chairman of Leyland Nigeria, an indigenous automobile assembly plant.

== Philanthropy and Sports Advocacy ==
=== Nathaniel Idowu Foundation and Health Initiatives ===
Idowu's philanthropic efforts are channelled through the Nathaniel Idowu Foundation, which was formalized in 2010. The foundation supports youth sports, education, and healthcare programs.

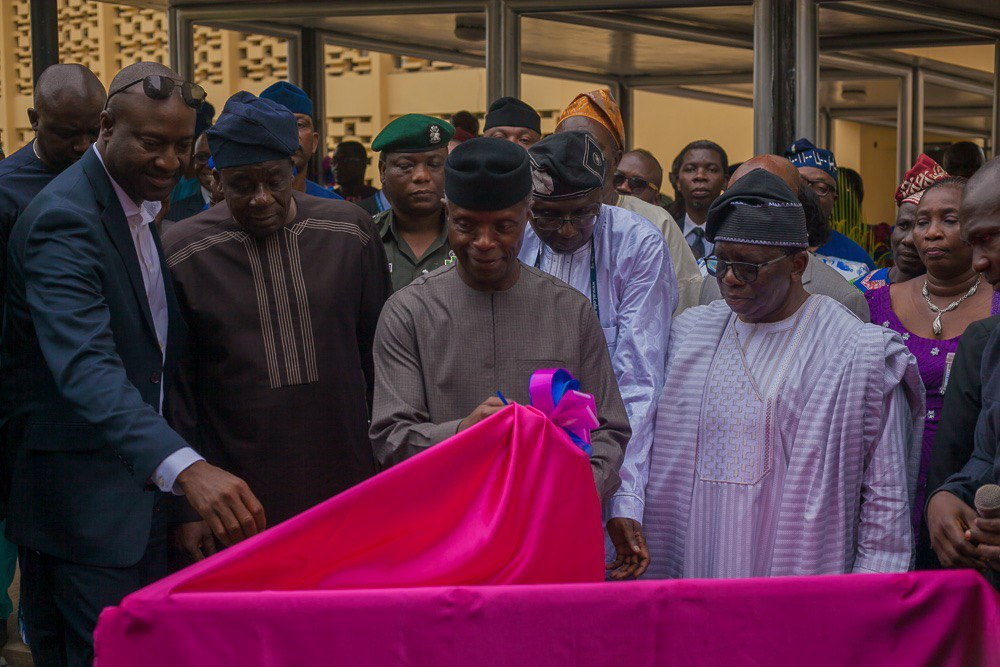
Nathaniel Idowu Foundation donates a NGN350 million Multidisciplinary Translational Research Complex to the College of Medicine at University of Ibadan

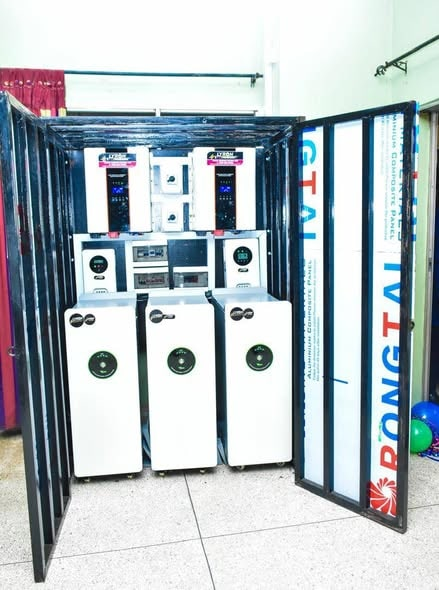
Solar Power System Donated by Nathaniel Idowu Foundation - Yemi Idowu

The foundation's health programs support preventive and primary healthcare, including funding WHO-recognized clinics at Eniosa and Sagbe in Ibadan, Oyo State, which reportedly serve over 10,000 people annually. For tertiary healthcare research, the foundation donated a ₦350 million Multidisciplinary Translational Research Complex to the College of Medicine, University of Ibadan (UI), in 2018 and established West Africa's first Drug Testing and Toxicology Unit in 2020. In September 2025, the foundation donated a 15 kW solar power system to the University College Hospital (UCH) and the College of Medicine, University of Ibadan. Idowu has advocated for corporate organizations and individuals to increase their support for the health sector, stating that "government cannot do it alone".

=== Grassroots Sports Infrastructure (Ajegunle Maracana) ===
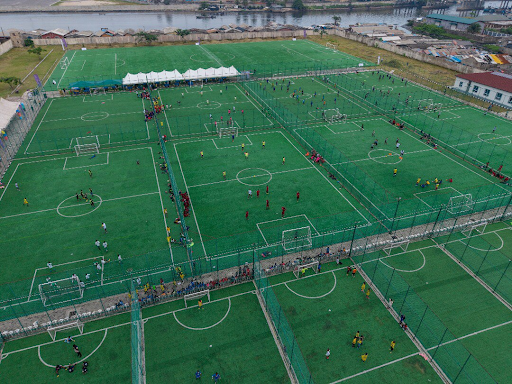
Ajegunle Maracana Sports Centre in Lagos reclaimed and reconstructed by Yemi Idowu

A key philanthropic project led by Idowu is the reclamation and reconstruction of 19 football pitches at the Ajegunle Maracana Sports Centre in Lagos. The multi-sports complex, located in Ajeromi-Ifelodun Local Government Area, was developed to promote and structure grassroots sports. The facility, inaugurated in May 2022, includes plans for an Olympic-size swimming pool, a grandstand, and hostels. Idowu described the project's purpose as helping to "create a football culture for Nigeria."

=== Football Development and Policy Advocacy ===
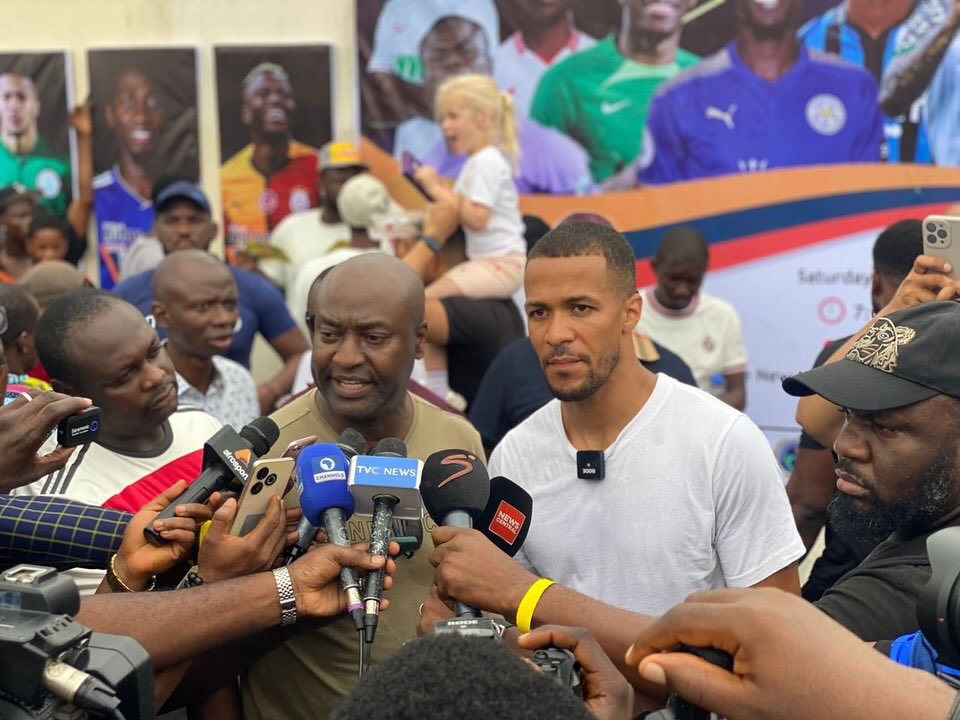
Yemi Idowu and Wilfred Ndidi at Ajegunle Maracana Sports Centre 2025 Children Fest

Idowu is the chairman of Nathaniel Boys Football Club, a grassroots team credited with developing Nigerian international midfielder Wilfred Ndidi. Ndidi, who played for Genk in the Belgian Pro League, started his career at the club.

As Vice Chairman of the Football Masterplan Development Committee, Idowu co-authored a 10-year strategic blueprint for Nigerian football. He has consistently called for reforms to support football academies and reverse the decline in national football talent, emphasizing that sustainable talent development requires strong grassroots organised

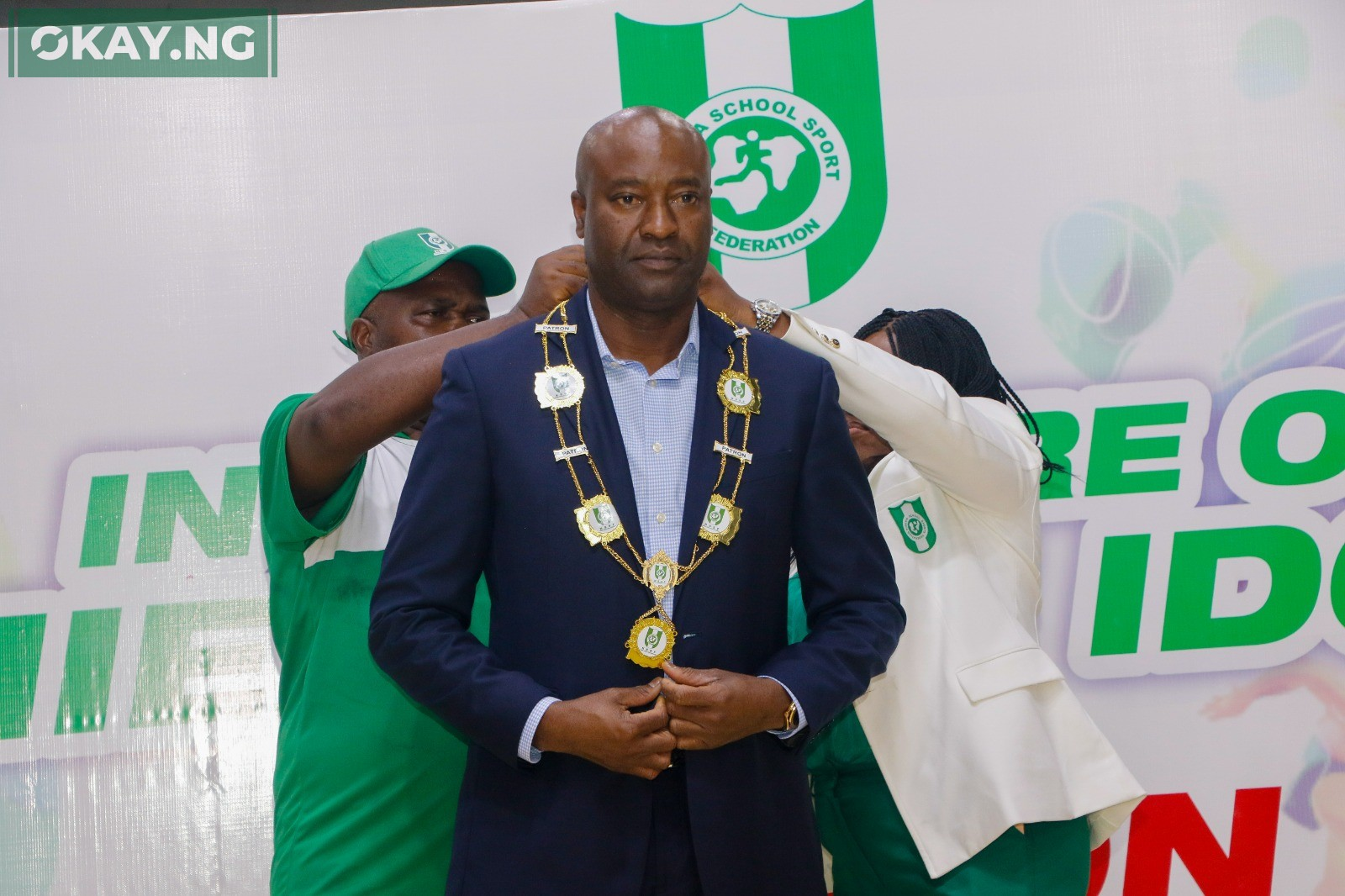
(NSSF) appoints Chief Yemi Idowu as its patron

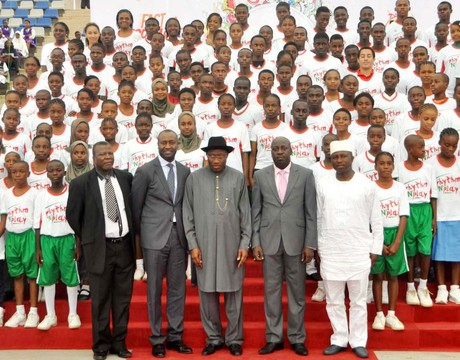
President Goodluck Jonathan alongside Yemi Idowu launches Rhythm n Play Campaign for Grassroot Sports Mobilisation

In July 2023, Idowu was invested as the Patron of the Nigeria School Sports Federation (NSSF). In this role, he pledged new resources and interventions to elevate school sports. He was also instrumental in conceptualizing and implementing "Rhythm N' Play", a national youth sports mobilization campaign launched in 2013 to engage two million schoolchildren in organized sports.

== Public Service and Governance Roles ==
=== Lagos State Security Trust Fund (LSSTF) ===
In November 2015, Idowu was appointed to the Board of Trustees of the Lagos State Security Trust Fund (LSSTF) by then-Governor Akinwunmi Ambode. The LSSTF is a public-private partnership created to fund and support security infrastructure for Lagos State.

=== Presidential Committee on Fiscal Policy and Tax Reforms ===
Idowu was appointed to the Presidential Committee on Fiscal Policy and Tax Reforms (PCFTR), which was established by President Bola Tinubu in July 2023. The committee, chaired by Taiwo Oyedele, is mandated to redesign Nigeria's fiscal policy and harmonise tax administration.
