= Federal Ministry of Budget and Economic Planning (Nigeria) =

Federal Ministry of Nigeria

The Federal Ministry of Budget and Economic Planning is one of the Federal Ministries of Nigeria.

== History ==
It was originally set up by Decree No 12 of 1992 as the National Planning Commission and later amended by Act 71 of 1993. The core responsibility of the commission is the formulation of medium term and long term economic and development plans for the nation.

== Organisation ==
The National Planning Commission is headed by the Minister of National Planning, who is also the Deputy Chairman of the National Planning Commission. The Chairman of the Commission is the Vice President (currently, Prof. Yemi Osinbajo).

== History ==
The National Planning Commission was originally established by Decree No 12 of 1992 and later amended by Act 71 of 1993. The Commission has the mandate to determine and advise the Government of the Federation on matters relating to National Development and overall management of the national economy. The detailed objectives, functions, powers and structure of the Commission are outlined under sections 2, 3 and 5 of the Establishment Act.

== Functions ==
- To provide policy advice to the President in particular and Nigeria in general on all spheres of national life;
- To set national priorities and goals and engender consensus among Government agencies, as may be contained in guidelines issued by the Commission from time to time;
- To undertake periodic review and appraisal of the human and material resources capabilities of Nigeria with a view to advancing their development, efficiency and effective utilization;
- To formulate and prepare long-term, medium-term and short-term national development plans and to co-ordinate such plans at the Federal, State and Local government levels;
- To monitor projects and progress relating to plan implementation;
- To advise on changes and adjustments in institutions and management techniques as well as attitudes necessary for the alignment of actions with plan targets and goals;
- To conduct research into various aspects of national interest and public policy and ensure that the implications and results of the findings in such research are geared towards the enhancement of national, economic, social, technological defence and security capabilities and management;
- To mobilize popular group and institutional consensus in support of Government policies and programmes;
- To manage multilateral and bilateral economic co-operation, including development aid and technical assistance;
- To deal with matters relating to regional economic co-operation, including the Economic Community of West African States (ECOWAS), the African Common Market (ACM), the United Nations Economic Commission for Africa (UNECA), and South–South cooperation; and
- To carry out such other duties as are necessary or expedient for the full discharge of all or any of the functions conferred on the Commission under the Act.

== Programs ==
=== Transformation Agenda ===
The Transformation Agenda is a medium term development strategy to speed up the actualization of the NV 20:2020. It is a framework for the actualization of the Federal Government's economic growth agenda during 2011–2015. The Agenda is anchored on the pillars and targets of the NV 20:2020 and it aims to i) create decent jobs in sufficient quantity to resolve the protracted problem of unemployment and reduce poverty, ii) lay foundation for robust and inclusive growth within the Nigerian economy, and iii) improve, on a sustainable basis, the well-being of all classes of Nigerians regardless of their circumstances and location. The four areas of focus of the Transformation Agenda are governance, human capital development, infrastructure and real sector.

=== First National Implementation Plan ===
The First National Implementation Plan (1st NIP), with the theme "Accelerating Development, Competitiveness and Wealth Creation", is a medium term plan for the actualization of the long term broad objectives and targets of the NV 20:2020. The 1st NIP is the period 2010-2013 and it aims to bridge the infrastructural gap in the country, optimize the sources of economic growth to increase productivity and competitiveness, develop a knowledge-based economy to deepen the technology base of the country, improve governance, security law and order, and foster accelerated, sustainable social and economic development in a competitive business environment. The 1st NIP contains priority projects and programmes of the Federal Government and investment plans for the State Governments. The total investment profile for 1st NIP is N32 trillion, with the Federal Government investing N10 trillion, and the States and Local Governments investing N9 trillion. The private sector will invest the remaining N13 trillion.

A Monitoring and Evaluation (M&E) framework has been established to track progress in the implementation of the 1st NIP to ensure high performance and accountability. The M&E framework also includes a Performance Contract between the President and the Ministers/Heads of agencies, which is cascaded down the Ministries and Agencies. A National M&E Report is produced annually.

=== Nigeria Vision 20: 2020 ===
The Nigeria Vision 20: 2020 is a perspective plan; an economic business plan intended to make Nigeria one of the top 20 economies by 2020, with a growth target of not less than $900 billion in GDP and a per capita of not less than $4,000 per annum. The three Pillars of the NV 20:2020 are i) guaranteeing the well-being and productivity of the people, ii) optimizing the key sources of economic growth and iii) fostering sustainable social and economic development.

NV 20:2020 is Nigeria's second attempt at driving the attainment of her national aspirations using long-term perspective plan. In addition to the first perspective plan (Vision 2010), several strategic planning efforts have been undertaken by the Federal Government in recent years. These efforts include the Poverty Strategy Reduction Papers (PSRPs), the National Economic Empowerment and Development Strategy (NEEDS I & II), Nigeria's Strategy for attaining the Millennium Development Goals, and the Seven Point Agenda.

=== NEEDS ===
NEEDS is Nigeria's home- grown poverty reduction strategy (PRSP). NEEDS builds on the earlier two-year effort to produce the interim PRSP (I-PRSP), and the wide consultative and participatory processes associated with it. It is a medium term strategy (2003– 07) but which derives from the country's long-term goals of poverty reduction, wealth creation, employment generation and value re-orientation.

NEEDS is a nationally coordinated framework of action in close collaboration with the State and Local governments (with their State Economic Empowerment and Development Strategy, SEEDS) and other stakeholders to consolidate on the achievements of the last four years (1999–2003) and build a solid foundation for the attainment of Nigeria's long-term vision of becoming the largest and strongest African economy and a key player in the world economy.

=== SEEDS ===
On the State level, State Economic Empowerment and Development Strategies (SEEDS) are being developed to complement NEEDS. The donor community, made up of IBRD, DFID, EU and UNDP, is taking advantage of this change to align their local programs to improve the quality of assistance to the country.

Since states receive over 52% of federal resources, NPC – in collaboration with the donors-decided to develop a system whereby state performance can be monitored using SEEDS and to identify priority areas and states that demonstrate effective use of allocated resources.

The SEEDS process was launched in early 2004 and a SEEDS Manual designed by the National Planning Commission (NPC) setting out the required contents and process for an effective SEEDS was disseminated to all state via a national dissemination process involving representatives of government, civil society and the private sector at state level. Subsequently, technical assistance was offered to all state to support the development of their SEEDS by teams of consultants with relevant expertise.

Benefits to Selected States

- The Federal Government, together with a number of donors are committed to provide project matching grants to those States that perform well in the exercise.
- Possible debt relief is to be made available to states that perform well in the exercise.
- Increase Donor presence is also one of the benefit for performing well in the exercise.
- The Federal Government, together with donor partners are also committed to give capacity support to States that perform well in the exercise.

== Parastatals ==
- Nigerian Institute of Social and Economic Research
- Centre for Management Development

The Centre for Management Development (CMD) is a resource institution established by Decree 51 of 1976 as the operational arm of the Nigerian Council for Management Development.

The Federal Executive Council, in line with the Federal Government's policy on rationalization of the Public Service, approved the merger of the Centre with the National Centre for Economic Management and Administration (NCEMA). Following this, NCEMA was shut down and all its activities transferred to CMD.

Specifically, the Centre pursues one of its roles of capacity building by:

Identifying the type and quantity of programmes required for the country's managerial manpower; developing resources for management teaching, training and consultancy; building institutions to meet the need of national development; improving the quality and enhancing the use of management consulting, research and training; serving primarily as a training centre for economic planners, policy analysts, budget and project officers at the federal, state and local government levels; developing and strengthening specific skills that will enhance the quality of management of the national economy at the macro and sectoral levels; and being a policy laboratory for vigorous and sustained development and promotion of highly specialized skills required for enhancing efficient and effective planning and management of the Nigerian economy among others.

In addition to these mandates, the Centre undertakes the management development component of small-scale industries development through the design and provision of suitable training packages for small-scale industrialists and officials of federal/state agencies, which have responsibilities for developing small-scale industries in the economy.

Director-General Dr Kabir Kabo Usman Assumed office January 2010 – Present

Preceded by Dr Joseph Maiyaki

- National Bureau of Statistics

== See also ==
- Nigerian Civil Service
- Federal Ministries of Nigeria
