= Federal Road Safety Corps =

Government agency of Nigeria

- Common name: Road Safety
- Abbreviation: FRSC
- Motto: Creating Safer Motoring Environment in Nigeria

Agency overview
- Formed: February 1988; 38 years ago

Jurisdictional structure
- Federal agency (Operations jurisdiction): Nigeria
- Operations jurisdiction: Nigeria
- Legal jurisdiction: Road Safety and Motor Vehicle Administration
- Constituting instrument: Federal Road Safety Commission Act
- General nature: Federal law enforcement

Operational structure
- Headquarters: No. 4 Maputo Street. Zone 3, Wuse, Abuja, Nigeria
- Agency executive: Shehu Mohammed, Corps Marshal

Website
- frsc.gov.ng

Federal Road Safety Corps (FRSC) is the government agency with statutory responsibilities for road safety administration in Nigeria. Founded in 1988, the Federal Road Safety Corps operates in all Nigerian states as well as the Federal Capital Territory and is the leading agency in Nigeria on road safety administration and management. The statutory functions include: Making the highways safe for motorists and other road users as well as checking road worthiness of vehicles, recommending works and infrastructure to eliminate or minimize accidents on the highways, and educating motorists and members of the public on the importance of road discipline on the highways.

== History ==
=== Origins ===
Prior to the establishment of the Federal Road Safety Commission in 1988, there was no concrete and sustained policy action to address the carnage on Nigerian roads. Earlier attempts in this direction were limited to discrete and isolated attempts by some states of the federation and individuals.

Notable among the efforts to institute a formidable road safety program was the effort of Shell Petroleum Development Company of Nigeria (SPDC) between 1960 and 1965. The effort of the Nigerian Army in the training of its officers and men on road safety in the early 1970s also contributed to road safety ideas and consciousness in Nigeria: The Nigerian Army started the First Public Road Safety Campaign in 1972 when it initiated an annual Road Safety Week.

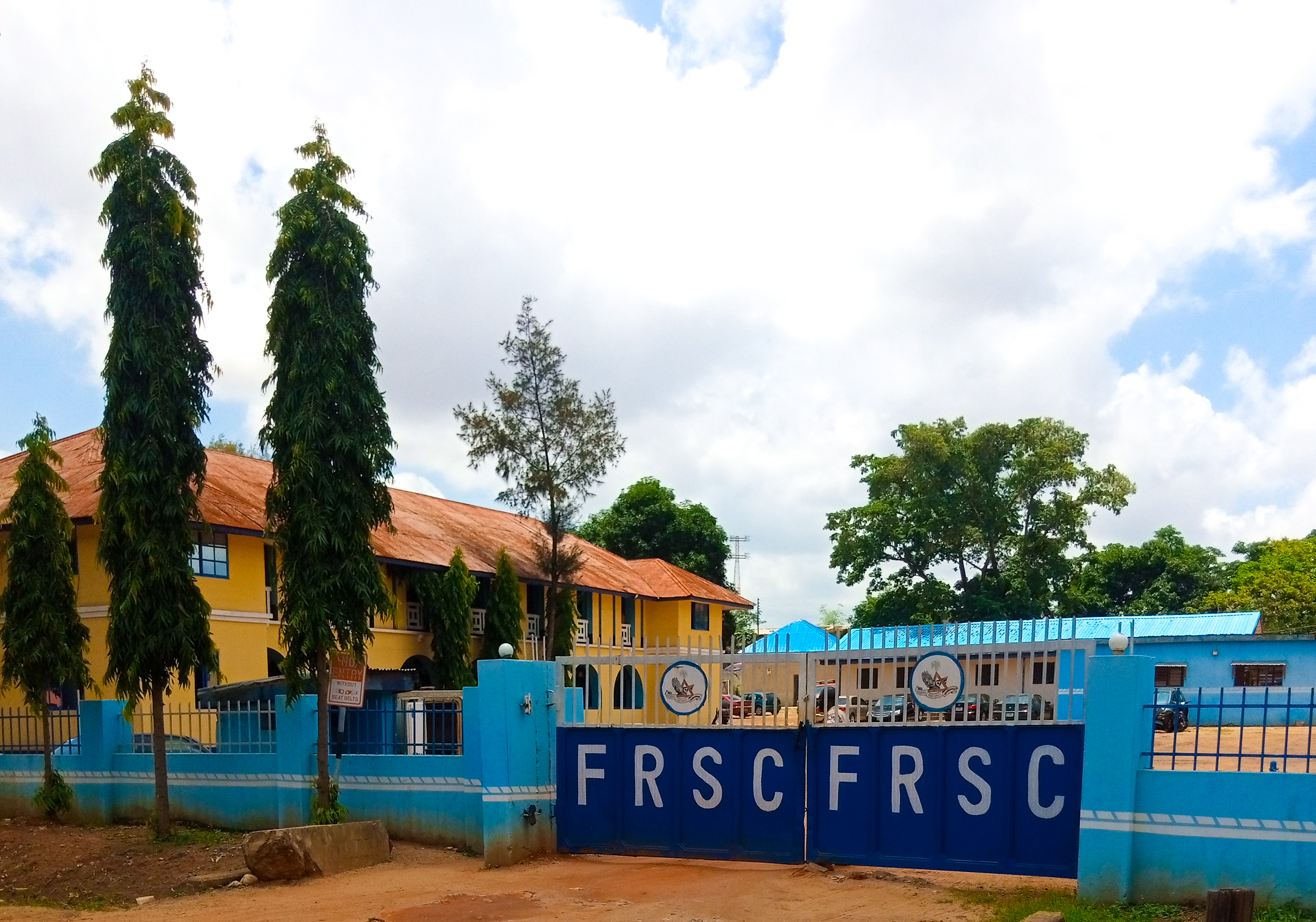
FRSC, RS1.1 Kaduna State Sector Command

The first deliberate policy on road safety was the creation in 1974 of the National Road Safety Commission (NRSC) by the then-military government. The impact of the commission was, however, not sustained. In 1977, the Military Administration in Oyo State, Nigeria established the Oyo State Road Safety Corps which made some local significant improvements in road safety and road discipline in the state. That lasted till 1983 when it was disbanded by the federal government.

With the continued dangerous trend of road traffic accidents in Nigeria then, which placed it as one of the most road traffic accident (RTA) prone countries worldwide (the most in Africa) in 2013, the Nigerian government saw the need to establish the present Federal Road Safety Corps in 1988 to address the carnage on the highways.

=== Establishment ===
In February 1988 the federal government established the Federal Road Safety Commission through Decree No. 45 of 1988 as amended by Decree 35 of 1992 referred to in the statute books as the FRSC Act cap 141 Laws of the Federation of Nigeria (LFN), passed by the National Assembly as Federal Road Safety Corps (establishment) Act 2007.

== Statutory functions ==
The functions of the Commission generally relate to:

- Making the highway safe for motorists and other road users.
- Recommending works and devices designed to eliminate or minimize accidents on the highways and advising the federal and state governments including the Federal Capital Territory Administration and relevant governmental agencies on the localities where such works and devices are required, and
- Educating motorists and members of the public on the importance of discipline on the highway.

In particular, the commission is charged with responsibilities as follows:

- Preventing or minimizing accidents on the highway.
- Clearing obstructions on any part of the highways.
- Educating drivers, motorists and other members of the public generally on the proper use of the highways.
- Designing and producing the driver's license to be used by various categories of vehicle operators.
- Determining, from time to time, the requirements to be satisfied by an applicant for a driver's licence.
- Designing and producing vehicle number plates.
- The standardization of highway traffic codes.
- Educating drivers, motorists and other members of the public generally on the proper use of the highways.
- Giving prompt attention and care to victims of accidents.
- Conducting research into causes of motor accidents and methods of preventing them and putting into use the result of such research.
- Determining and enforcing speed limits for all categories of roads and vehicles and controlling the use of speed-limiting devices.
- Cooperating with bodies or agencies or groups in road safety activities or in the prevention of accidents on the highways.
- Making regulations in pursuance of any of the functions assigned to the Corps by or under this Act.
- Regulating the use of sirens, flashers and beacon lights on vehicles other than ambulances and vehicles belonging to the Armed Forces, Nigeria Police, Fire Service and other Paramilitary agencies;
- Providing roadside and mobile clinics for the treatment of accident victims free of charge.
- Regulating the use of mobile phones by motorists.
- Regulating the use of seat belts and other safety devices.
- Regulating the use of motorcycles on the highways.
- Maintaining the validity period for drivers' licences which shall be three or five years subject to renewal at the expiration of the validity period.

In exercising these functions, members of the Commission have the power to arrest and prosecute persons reasonably suspected of having committed any traffic offence.

== Rank structure ==
The Corps is divided into the Officer and Marshal cadres. The Officer cadre has the responsibility of leadership, planning, and coordination at various levels of command. The Marshal cadre is made up of the Marshal Inspectorate (MI) and Road Marshal Assistant (RMA). The MIs known generally as Inspectors serve as intermediaries in command between the Officers and the whole Marshal Cadre.

=== Officers ===
The officer ranks are as follows from the highest:

1. Corps Marshal (CM) who serves as Chief Executive of the Corps.
2. Deputy Corps Marshal (DCM)
3. Assistant Corps Marshal (ACM)
4. Corps Commanders (CC)
5. Deputy Corps Commanders (DCC)
6. Assistant Corps Commanders (ACC)
7. Chief Route Commander (CRC)
8. Superintendent Route Commander (SRC)
9. Route Commander (RC)
10. Deputy Route Commander (DRC)
11. Assistant Route Commander (ARC)

=== Marshals ===
Marshal Inspectorate	Road Marshal Assistant
Chief Inspector (CI)	Chief Road Marshal Assistant (CRMA)
Deputy Chief Inspector (DCI)	Deputy Chief Road Marshal Assistant (DCRMA)
Assistant Chief Inspector (ACI)	Senior Road Marshal Assistant (SRMA)
Principal Marshal Inspector (PMI)	Road Marshal Assistant I (RMA-I)
Senior Marshal Inspector (SMI)	Road Marshal Assistant II (RMA-II)
Marshal Inspector I (MI-I)	Road Marshal Assistant III (RMA-III)
Marshal Inspector II (MI-II)	Chief Road Marshal Assistant (CRMA)
Marshal Inspector III (MI-III)	

All staff in the Officer and Marshal cadre are considered Regular Marshals. There exists an unpaid volunteer force known as Special Marshals who supplement the numbers of the Corps.

== Special Marshals ==
The Special Marshals are the volunteer arm of the Federal Road Safety Corps. The volunteer arm was created by the same FRSC statute Sec. 10 (1)… "the Corps" which shall consist of such number of uniform and non-uniform members as may be determined, from time to time, by the Commission. FRSC Establishment Act (2007). They are men and women of means, with proven integrity in society, and able to influence their immediate environment (work place/community) in favor of the course of road safety. The Act empowers the Special Marshals to carry out patrol and other activities that ensure good road usage on our highways. Just like their Regular counterparts, they can arrest and book traffic offenders as well as prosecute them when necessary.

They can be identified with their blue high visibility regalia including face caps, high visibility jackets and arm bands. Special Marshals work strictly under the supervision of Regular Marshals.

== Safety and Traffic Cadet Corps ==
The Nigeria Safety Cadet Corps (NSC) is a nationwide voluntary youth organisation established to instill road safety culture amongst Nigerians. It operates under the Federal University of Agriculture, Abeokuta. It is affiliated with the FRSC and the university administration to ensure that road safety principles are taught and practiced. Members undergo structured training in first aid, traffic management, public education, and emergency response.
