= Ngozi Okonjo-Iweala =

Nigerian economist (born 1954)

Dr Ngozi Okonjo-Iweala GCON
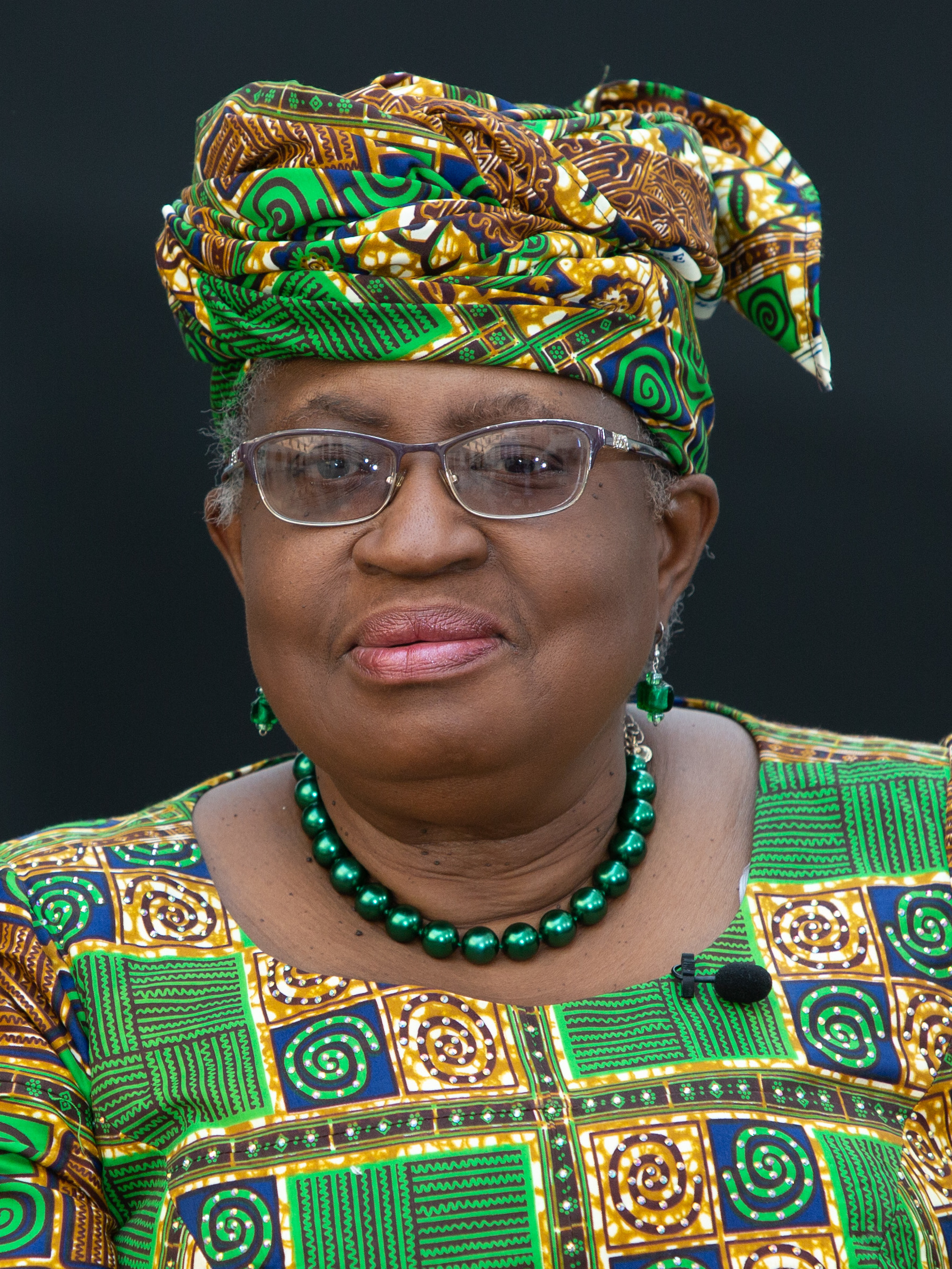
- Okonjo-Iweala in 2021

7th Director-General of the World Trade Organization
- Incumbent
- Assumed office 8 March 2021
- Preceded by: Roberto Azevêdo

Minister of Finance
- In office 17 August 2011 – 29 May 2015
- President: Goodluck Jonathan
- Preceded by: Olusegun Olutoyin Aganga
- Succeeded by: Kemi Adeosun
- In office 15 July 2003 – 21 June 2006
- President: Olusegun Obasanjo
- Preceded by: Adamu Ciroma
- Succeeded by: Nenadi Usman

Coordinating Minister for the Economy
- In office 17 August 2011 – 29 May 2015
- President: Goodluck Jonathan
- Preceded by: Olusegun Olutoyin Aganga
- Succeeded by: Position abolished

Minister of Foreign Affairs
- In office 21 June 2006 – 30 August 2006
- President: Olusegun Obasanjo
- Preceded by: Oluyemi Adeniji
- Succeeded by: Joy Ogwu

Personal details
- Born: 13 June 1954 (age 72) Ogwashi Ukwu, Nigeria
- Citizenship: Nigeria (1954–present)
- Spouse: Ikemba Iweala
- Children: 4, including Uzodinma
- Education: Harvard University (BA); Massachusetts Institute of Technology (MA, PhD)

Dr Ngozi Okonjo-Iweala GCON (/əŋˈɡoʊzi əˈkoʊndʒoʊ ɪˈweɪlə/, Igbo pronunciation: [ŋ́gɔ́zí òkóꜜńdʒó ìwáàːlà]; born 13 June 1954) is a Nigerian economist who has been serving as the director-general of the World Trade Organization since March 2021. She is the first ever woman and also the first African to lead the World Trade Organization as director-general.

She was previously on the boards of Danone, Standard Chartered Bank, MINDS: Mandela Institute for Development Studies, Carnegie Endowment for International Peace, Georgetown Institute for Women, Peace and Security, One Campaign, GAVI: Global Alliance for Vaccines and Immunization, Rockefeller Foundation, R4D: Results for Development, ARC: African Risk Capacity and Earthshot Prize plus others. She also previously sat on the Twitter Board of Directors, and stepped down in February 2021 in connection with her appointment as director-general of the World Trade Organization.

Okonjo-Iweala serves at the Brookings Institution as a non-resident distinguished fellow with the Africa Growth Initiative in their Global Economy and Development Program. She is a Commissioner Emeritus and Co-Chair of Global Commission on the Economy and Climate. At the World Bank, she had a 25-year career as a development economist; rising to become Managing Director for Operations from 2007 to 2011. Okonjo-Iweala was the first Nigerian woman to serve two terms as Finance Minister of Nigeria; initially, under President Olusegun Obasanjo from 2003 to 2006; and secondly, under President Goodluck Jonathan from 2011 to 2015. Subsequently, from June to August 2006, she served as Minister for Foreign Affairs of Nigeria. In 2005, Euromoney named her Global Finance Minister of the Year.

== Early life and education ==
Okonjo-Iweala was born in Ogwashi-Ukwu, Delta State, Nigeria, where her father, Professor Chukwuka Okonjo, was the Obi (king) of the Obahai royal family of Ogwashi-Ukwu in Nigeria.

She is married to Dr. Ikemba Iweala and they have four children.

She briefly attended Queen's School, Enugu; she was later relocated to live and to further her education in St. Anne's School, Molete, Ibadan, Oyo State; and also attended the International School, Ibadan, in Oyo State. In 1973 she moved to the United States to study at Harvard University and graduated magna cum laude with an AB in economics in 1976. She earned a master's degree in city planning in 1978 and obtained her PhD in regional economics and development in 1981 from the Massachusetts Institute of Technology with the thesis Credit policy, rural financial markets, and Nigeria's agricultural development. She received an international fellowship from the American Association of University Women (AAUW), which supported her doctoral studies.

== Career ==
=== World Bank ===
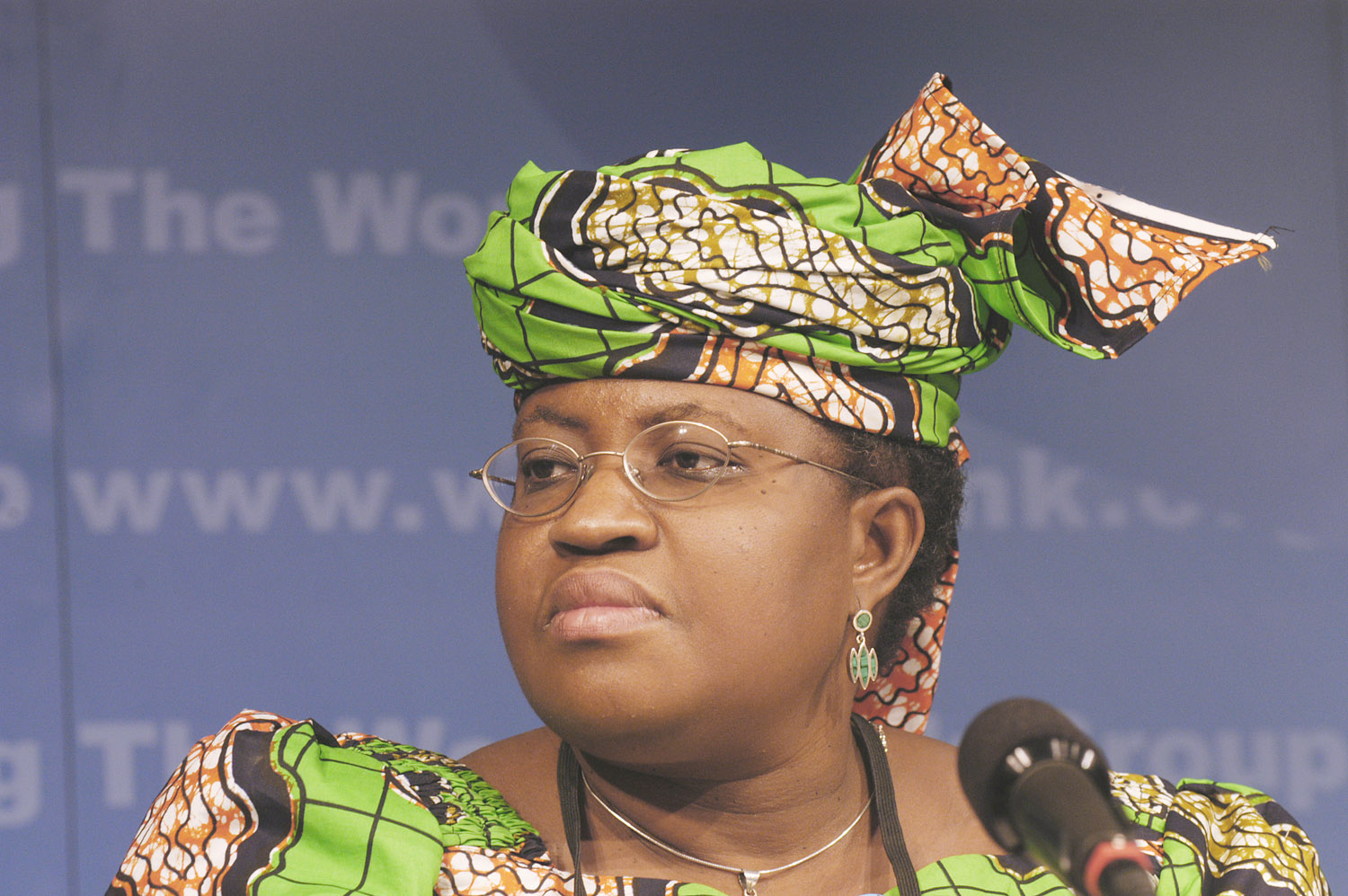
Okonjo-Iweala, at the 2004 Spring Meetings of the International Monetary Fund and the World Bank Group

Okonjo-Iweala had a 25-year career at the World Bank in Washington, D.C., as a development economist and rose to the No. 2 position of Managing Director, Operations. As Managing Director, she had oversight responsibility for the World Bank’s $81 billion operational portfolio in Africa, South Asia, Europe, and Central Asia. Okonjo-Iweala spearheaded several World Bank initiatives to assist low-income countries during the 2008–2009 food crises and later during the financial crisis. In 2010, she chaired the IDA replenishment, the World Bank’s successful drive to raise $49.3 billion in grants and low-interest credit for the world's poorest country. During her time at the World Bank, she was also a member of the Commission on Effective Development Cooperation with Africa, which was set up by Danish Prime Minister Anders Fogh Rasmussen and held meetings between April and October 2008.

=== In government ===
Okonjo-Iweala served twice as Nigeria's Finance Minister (2003–2006 and 2011–2015) and briefly acted as Foreign Minister in 2006. She was the first woman to hold both positions. During her first tenure as Finance Minister in the administration of President Olusegun Obasanjo, she spearheaded negotiations with the Paris Club that led to the elimination of US$30 billion of Nigeria's debt, including the outright cancellation of US$18 billion. In 2003, she led efforts to improve Nigeria’s macroeconomic management including the implementation of an oil-price based fiscal rule. Revenues accruing above a reference benchmark oil price were saved in a special account, the "Excess Crude Account," which helped to reduce macroeconomic volatility. Okonjo-Iweala was also instrumental in helping Nigeria obtain its first ever sovereign credit rating (of BB minus) from Fitch Ratings and Standard & Poor’s in 2006. She also introduced the practice of publishing the federal, state, and local government shares of revenue from the country’s federal account. That action went a long way in increasing transparency in governance at all levels of government, particularly the sub-national level.

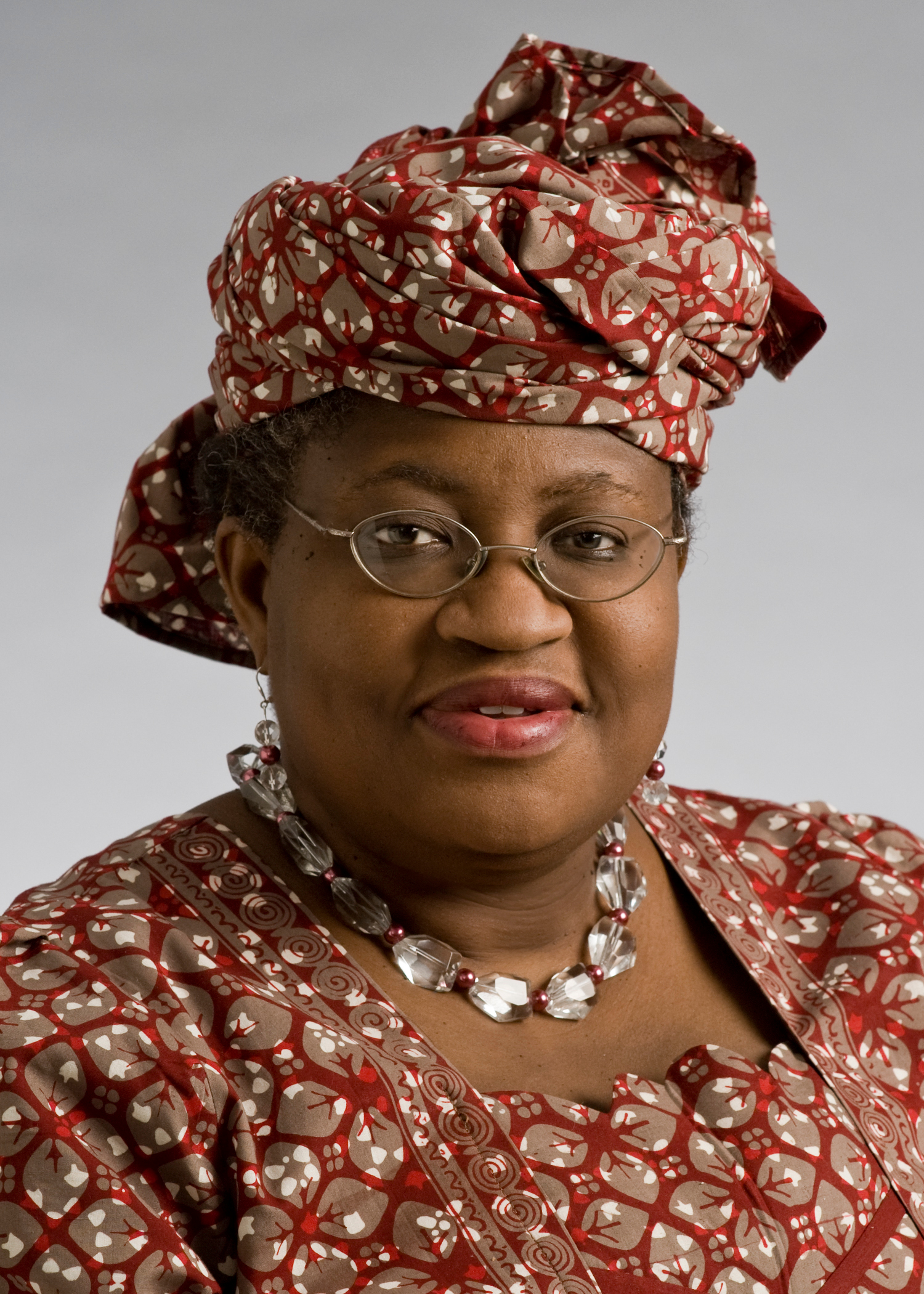
World Bank portrait, 2008

After her first term as Finance Minister, she served two months as Minister of Foreign Affairs in 2006. She returned to the World Bank as a Managing Director in December 2007.

In 2011, Okonjo-Iweala was re-appointed Minister of Finance in Nigeria with the expanded portfolio of the Coordinating Minister for the Economy by President Goodluck Jonathan. During her second tenure as Finance Minister, Dr Okonjo-Iweala led reforms to enhance transparency of government accounts and strengthened institutions against corruption, including the implementation of the GIFMS (Government Integrated Financial Management System), the IPPMS (Integrated Personnel and Payroll Management System), and the TSA (Treasury Single Accounts). As of February 2015, the IPPIS platform had eliminated 62,893 ghost workers from the system and saved the government about $1.25 billion in the process.

Her legacy includes strengthening the country's public financial systems and stimulating the housing sector with the establishment of the Nigerian Mortgage Refinance Corporation (NMRC) in 2013. Under her leadership, the National Bureau of Statistics carried out a re-basing exercise of the Gross Domestic Product (GDP), the first in 24 years, which saw Nigeria emerge as the largest economy in Africa. She also empowered women and youth with the Growing Girls and Women in Nigeria Programme (GWIN), a gender-responsive budgeting system, and the highly acclaimed Youth Enterprise with Innovation Programme (YouWIN); to support entrepreneurs, that created thousands of jobs. As part of Goodluck Jonathan's administration, she received death threats and endured the kidnapping of her mother when she tried to sanitise Nigeria’s fuel subsidy payments to some marketers in 2012.

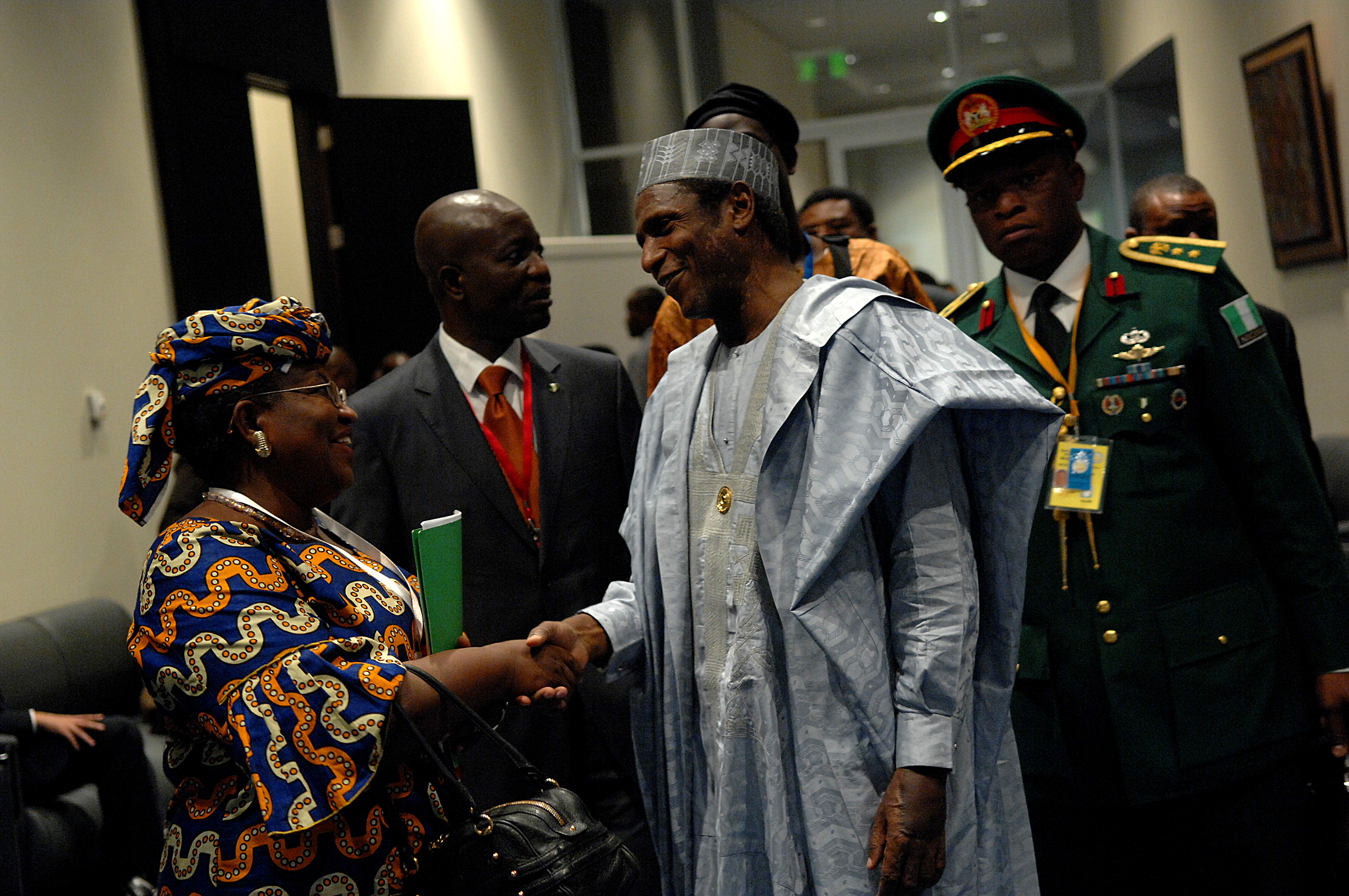
Nigeria's President Umaru Yar'Adua with Okonjo-Iweala, then managing director of the World Bank, in 2008

In addition to her role in government, Okonjo-Iweala served on the Commission on Growth and Development (2006–2009), led by Nobel Prize winner Professor Michael Spence. She was a member of the International Monetary and Finance Committee of the IMF (2003–2006 and 2011–2015) and the United Nations’ Secretary-General’s High-Level Panel on the Post-2015 Development Agenda (2012–2013). She also co-chaired the Global Partnership for Effective Development Cooperation with UK Secretary Justine Greening. In 2012, she was a candidate for President of the World Bank, running against former Colombian finance minister Jose Antonio Ocampo and Dartmouth College President Jim Yong Kim; if elected, she would have become the organization's first female president.

=== Later career ===
Okonjo-Iweala at the 2024 World Economic Forum

After leaving government, Okonjo-Iweala became a member of the International Commission on Financing Global Education Opportunity (2015–2016), chaired by Gordon Brown, and the Eminent Persons Group on Global Financial Governance, which was established by the G20 Finance Ministers and Central Bank Governors (2017–2018). Since 2014, she has been co-chairing the Global Commission for the Economy and Climate, with Nicholas Stern and Paul Polman. She also served as Chair of the Board of Gavi, the Vaccine Alliance (2016–2020).

Okonjo-Iweala is the founder of Nigeria's first indigenous opinion-research organization, NOI-Polls. She also founded the Centre for the Study of the Economies of Africa (C-SEA), a development research think-tank based in Abuja, and is a Distinguished Visiting Fellow at the Center for Global Development and the Brookings Institution.

Since 2019, Okonjo-Iweala has been part of UNESCO's International Commission on the Futures of Education, chaired by Sahle-Work Zewde. Also since 2019, she has been serving on the High-Level Council on Leadership & Management for Development of the Aspen Management Partnership for Health (AMP Health). In 2020, the International Monetary Fund's Managing Director Kristalina Georgieva appointed her to an external advisory group to provide input on policy challenges. Also in 2020, she was appointed by the African Union (AU) as special envoy to solicit international support to help the continent deal with the economic impact of the COVID-19 pandemic, as well as World Health Organization COVID-19 Special Envoy.

In June 2020, Nigerian President Muhammadu Buhari nominated Okonjo-Iweala as the country’s candidate to be director-general of the World Trade Organization (WTO). She later advanced to the final round of the election and eventually competed with Yoo Myung-hee. Ahead of the vote, she received the backing of the European Union for her candidacy. In October 2020, the United States government indicated that it would not back Okonjo-Iweala's candidacy. The WTO in its formal report said that Okonjo-Iweala "clearly carried the largest support by Members in the final round; and, enjoyed broad support from Members from all levels of development and from all geographic regions and has done so throughout the process" On 5 February 2021, Yoo Myung-hee announced her withdrawal from the race in "close consultation with the United States." According to a statement issued from the United States Trade Representative, “The United States takes note of today’s decision by the Republic of Korea’s Trade Minister Yoo Myung-hee to withdraw her candidacy for Director General of the WTO. The Biden-Harris Administration is pleased to express its strong support for the candidacy of Dr. Ngozi Okonjo-Iweala as the next Director General of the WTO." Okonjo-Iweala was unanimously appointed the next director-general on 15 February. She began her career as Director General of the WTO on 1 March 2021.

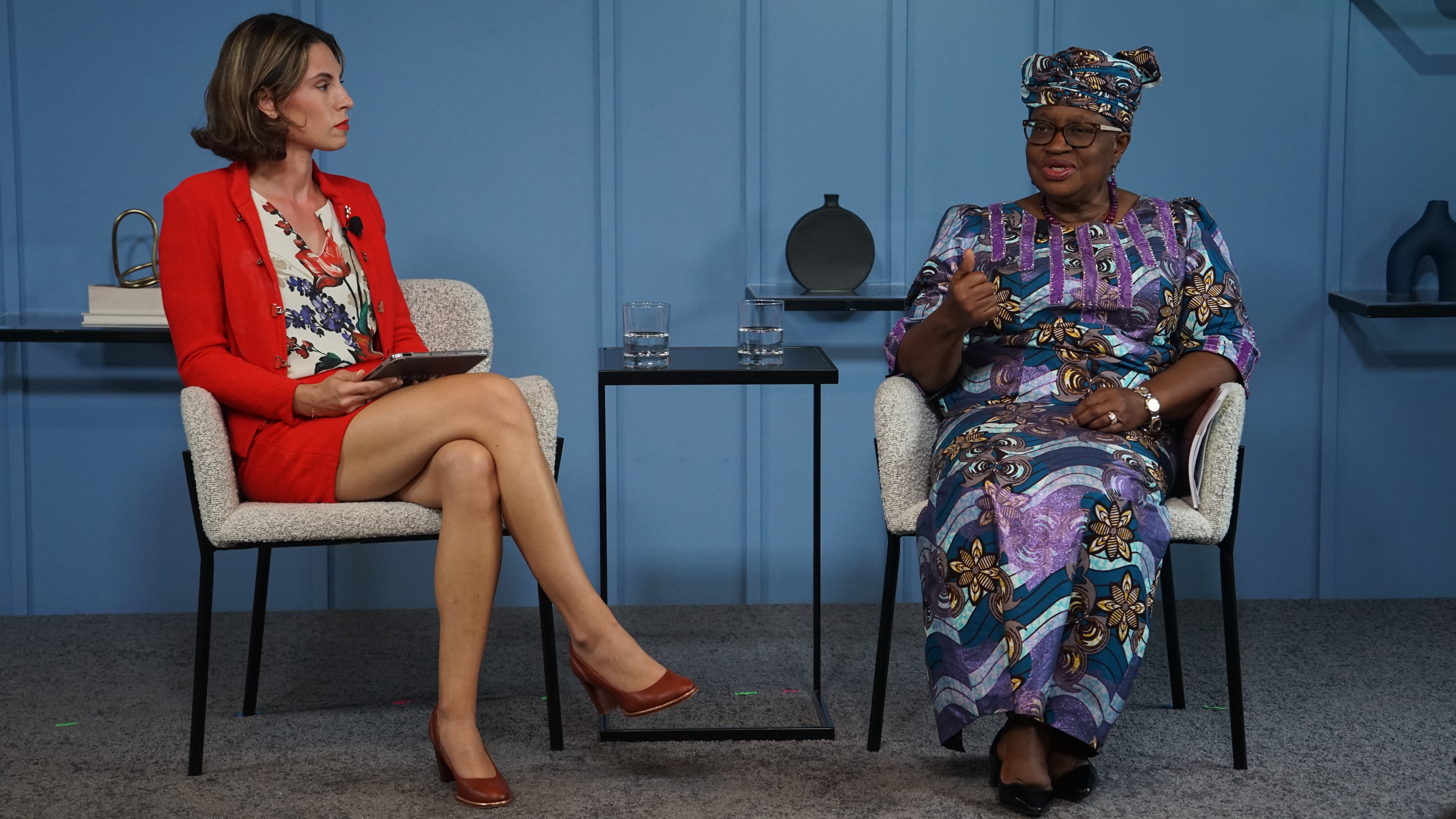
Rachel Wolfe, Okonjo-Iweala at Climate Week NYC 2025

In early 2021, Okonjo-Iweala was appointed co-chair, alongside Tharman Shanmugaratnam and Lawrence Summers, of the G20 High Level Independent Panel (HLIP) on financing the global commons for pandemic preparedness and response and was one of the founders of the COVAX Facility, designed to get affordable vaccines to Low and Middle-Income Countries. In July 2021, she joined the Multilateral Leaders Task Force on COVID-19 Vaccines, Therapeutics, and Diagnostics for Developing Countries, co-chaired by Tedros Adhanom and David Malpass. In January 2022, Okonjo-Iweala joined The Group of thirty (G30), an independent body of distinguished policymakers from around the world.

In November 2024, she was reappointed to serve her second term as the director-general of the World Trade Organization (WTO).

== Personal life ==
She is married to Ikemba Iweala, a neurosurgeon from Umuahia, Abia State, Nigeria. They have four children, including author Uzodinma Iweala.

== Other activities ==
=== Government agencies ===
- Japan International Cooperation Agency (JICA), Member of the International Advisory Board (since 2017)

=== International organizations ===
- Asian Infrastructure Investment Bank (AIIB), Member of the International Advisory Panel (since 2016)
- OECD/UNDP Tax Inspectors Without Borders (TIWB), Member of the Board
- GAVI, Chair of the Board (2016–2020)
- African Development Bank (AfDB), Ex-Officio Member of the Board of Governors (2003–2006, 2011–2015)
- International Monetary Fund (IMF), Member of the International Monetary and Finance Committee (2003–2006, 2011–2015)
- Joint World Bank-IMF Development Committee, Chair (2004)

=== Corporate boards ===
- Danone, Member of the Mission Committee (since 2020)
- Twitter, Member of the Board of Directors (since 2018)
- Standard Chartered, Independent Non-executive Member of the Board of Directors (since 2017)
- Lazard, Senior Advisor (since 2015)

=== Non-profit organizations ===
- Africa Europe Foundation (AEF), Member of the High-Level Group of Personalities on Africa-Europe Relations (since 2020)
- Carnegie Endowment for International Peace, Member of the Board of Trustees (since 2019)
- Bloomberg New Economy Forum, Member of the Advisory Board (since 2018)
- Results for Development (R4D), Member of the Board of Directors (since 2014)
- Women's World Banking, Member of the Africa Advisory Council (since 2014)
- The B Team, Member (since 2013)
- Friends of the Global Fund Africa, Member of the Board (since 2007)
- Global Financial Integrity (GFI), Member of the Advisory Board (since 2007)
- African Risk Capacity, Chair of the Board
- African University of Science and Technology, Chair of the Board
- Georgetown Institute for Women, Peace and Security, Member of the Advisory Board
- Global Business Coalition for Education, Member of the Advisory Board
- International Growth Centre (IGC), Senior Advisor
- Mandela Institute for Development Studies (MINDS), Member of the Advisory Board
- Mercy Corps, Member of the Global Leadership Council
- Rockefeller Foundation, Member of the Board of Trustees (2008–2018)
- Nelson Mandela Institution, Chair of the Board
- One Campaign, Member of the Board
- Oxford Martin School, Member of the Advisory Council
- Vital Voices, Member of the Global Advisory Council
- World Economic Forum Young Global Leaders Foundation, former Member of the Board
- World Economic Forum member of the Board of Trustees

== Recognition ==
=== Awards ===
Okonjo-Iweala has received numerous recognition and awards. She has been listed as one of the 50 Greatest World Leaders (Fortune, 2015), the Top 100 Most Influential People in the World (TIME, 2014 and 2021), the Top 100 Global Thinkers (Foreign Policy, 2011 and 2012), the Top 100 Most Powerful Women in the World (Forbes, 2011, 2012, 2013, 2014, 2022 and 2023), the 25 Most Influential Women in the World (Financial Times, 2021), the Top 3 Most Powerful Women in Africa (Forbes, 2012), the Top 10 Most Influential Women in Africa (Forbes, 2011), the Top 100 Women in the World (The Guardian, 2011), the Top 150 Women in the World (Newsweek, 2011), the Top 100 most inspiring people in the World Delivering for Girls and Women (Women Deliver, 2011). She was listed among 73 "brilliant" business influencers in the world by Condé Nast International.

In 2019, Okonjo-Iweala was elected to the American Academy of Arts and Sciences. She was also conferred High National Honours from the Republic of Côte d'Ivoire and the Republic of Liberia. She was also the recipient of Nigeria's second highest national honor Grand Commander of the Order of the Niger (GCON, 2022) and Nigeria's third highest National Honors Commander of the Federal Republic (CFR). She also received the Grand Cross of the Order of Rio Branco from the Federative Republic of Brazil in 2023. Other honors include:

- 2004 – TIME’s European Heroes Award
- 2004 – Finance Minister of the Year, Africa Investor Magazine
- 2005 – Finance Minister of the Year for Africa and the Middle East, Emerging Markets Magazine
- 2005 – Global Finance Minister of the Year, Euromoney
- 2005 – Finance Minister of the Year for Africa and the Middle East, The Banker
- 2010 – Bishop John T. Walker Distinguished Humanitarian Service Award
- 2010 – Global Leadership Award, Columbia University School of International and Public Affairs
- 2011 – Global Leadership Award, Chicago Council on Global Affairs
- 2011 – President of the Italian Republic Gold Medal, Pia Manzu Centre
- 2014 – David Rockefeller Bridging Leadership Award
- 2016 – Global Fairness Award, Global Fairness Initiative
- 2016 – Power with Purpose Award, Devex Development Communications Network
- 2017 – Madeleine K. Albright Global Development Award, Aspen Institute
- 2017 – Women’s Economic Empowerment Award, WEConnect International
- 2017 – Vanguard Award, Howard University
- 2017 – BBC's 100 women
- 2020 – African of the Year, Forbes Africa
- 2022 – 50 Over 50: EMEA Award, Forbes
- 2022 – Golden Plate Award, American Academy of Achievement
- 2022 – Humanitarian Award for a Lifetime of Public Service and Advocacy of Sustainable International Development, United Nations Association of New York
- 2023 – Honored with the Carnegie Corporation of New York's Great Immigrant Award.
- 2023 – Inducted into the International Women’s Forum (IWF) Hall of Fame

=== Honorary degrees ===
Okonjo-Iweala has received honorary Doctorate Degrees from 21 universities worldwide, including some from the most prestigious colleges:

- Brown University (2006),
- Colby College (2007)
- Trinity College, Dublin (2007)
- Amherst College (2009)
- University of Pennsylvania (2013)
- Yale University (2015)
- Northern Caribbean University, Jamaica
- LUISS Guido Carli, Italy (2021)
- American University (2022)
- Nyenrode Business University (2022)
- London School of Economics and Political Science (2023)
- Glasgow University (2023)
- University of Amsterdam (2022)
- University of Oxford (2024)
- Ahmadu Bello University (2026), Honorary Doctor of Science.

She has also received degrees from a host of Nigerian universities including Abia State University, Delta State University, Abraka, Oduduwa University, Babcock University, and the Universities of Port Harcourt, Calabar, and Obafemi Awolowo University (OAU). In 2019, Okonjo Iweala was awarded an honorary degree from Tel Aviv University. In June 2024, Okonjo-Iweala received an honorary degree from the University of Oxford.

== Works ==
=== Books ===
- Sallah, Tijan; Okonjo-Iweala, Ngozi (2003). Chinua Achebe: Teacher of Light, A Biography. Trenton, NJ: Africa World Press. ISBN 978-1-59221-031-2. LCCN 2002152037. OCLC 50919841. OL 3576773M.
- Okonjo-Iweala, Ngozi; Soludo, Charles Chukwuma; Muhtar, Mansur, eds. (2003). The Debt Trap in Nigeria: Towards a Sustainable Debt Strategy. Trenton, NJ: Africa World Press. ISBN 9781592210015. LCCN 2002007778. OCLC 49875048. OL 12376413M.
- Okonjo-Iweala, Ngozi (2012). Reforming the Unreformable: Lessons from Nigeria. Cambridge: MIT Press. ISBN 978-0-262-01814-2. LCCN 2012008453. OCLC 878501895. OL 25238823M.
- Okonjo-Iweala, Ngozi (2018). Fighting Corruption Is Dangerous: The Story Behind the Headlines. Cambridge: MIT Press. ISBN 978-0-262-03801-0. LCCN 2017041524. OCLC 1003273241. OL 27372326M.
- Gillard, Julia; Okonjo-Iweala, Ngozi (2020). Women and Leadership: Real Lives, Real Lessons. Penguin. p. 336. ISBN 9780143794288.

=== Articles ===
- Okonjo-Iweala, Ngozi; Keller, Janeen Madan (19 January 2016). "Shine a Light on the Gaps: Financial Inclusion Matters for Africa's Smallholder Farmers". Foreign Affairs. Archived from the original on 9 May 2019.
- Okonjo-Iweala, Ngozi (2016). "Funding THE SDGs: Licit and Illicit Financial Flows From Developing Countries". Horizons: Journal of International Relations and Sustainable Development. 6 (6): 108–117. JSTOR 48573616.

=== Talks ===
- Okonjo-Iweala, Ngozi (March 2007). Want to Help Africa? Do Business Here (TED Talk). Archived from the original on 17 February 2021.
- Okonjo-Iweala, Ngozi (June 2007). Aid versus trade (TED Talk). Archived from the original on 17 February 2021.
- Okonjo-Iweala, Ngozi (10 January 2014). Don't trivialise corruption, tackle it (TEDxEuston). Archived from the original on 21 December 2021.

== Gallery ==
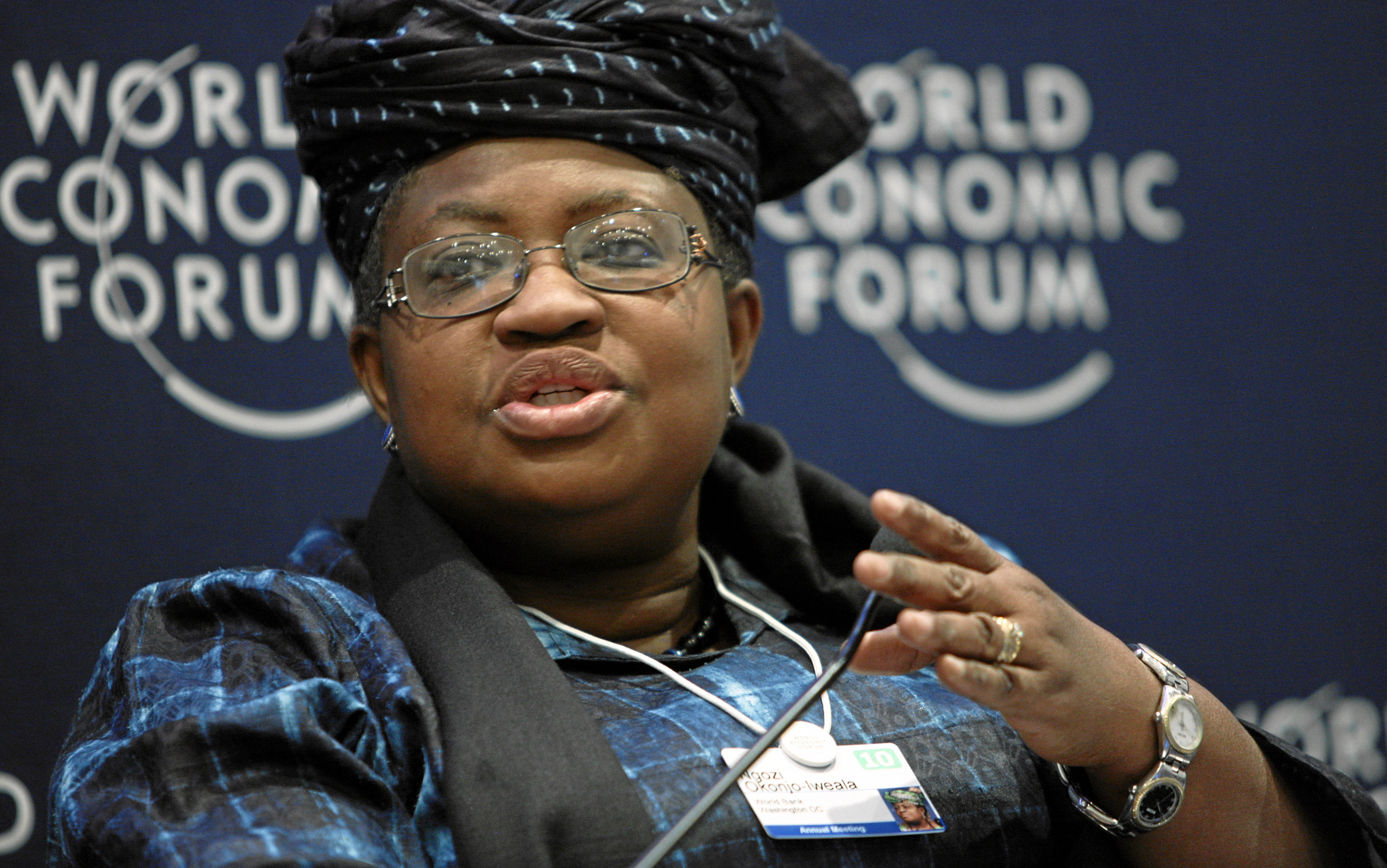
Ngozi Okonjo-Iweala at the 2007 World Economic Forum

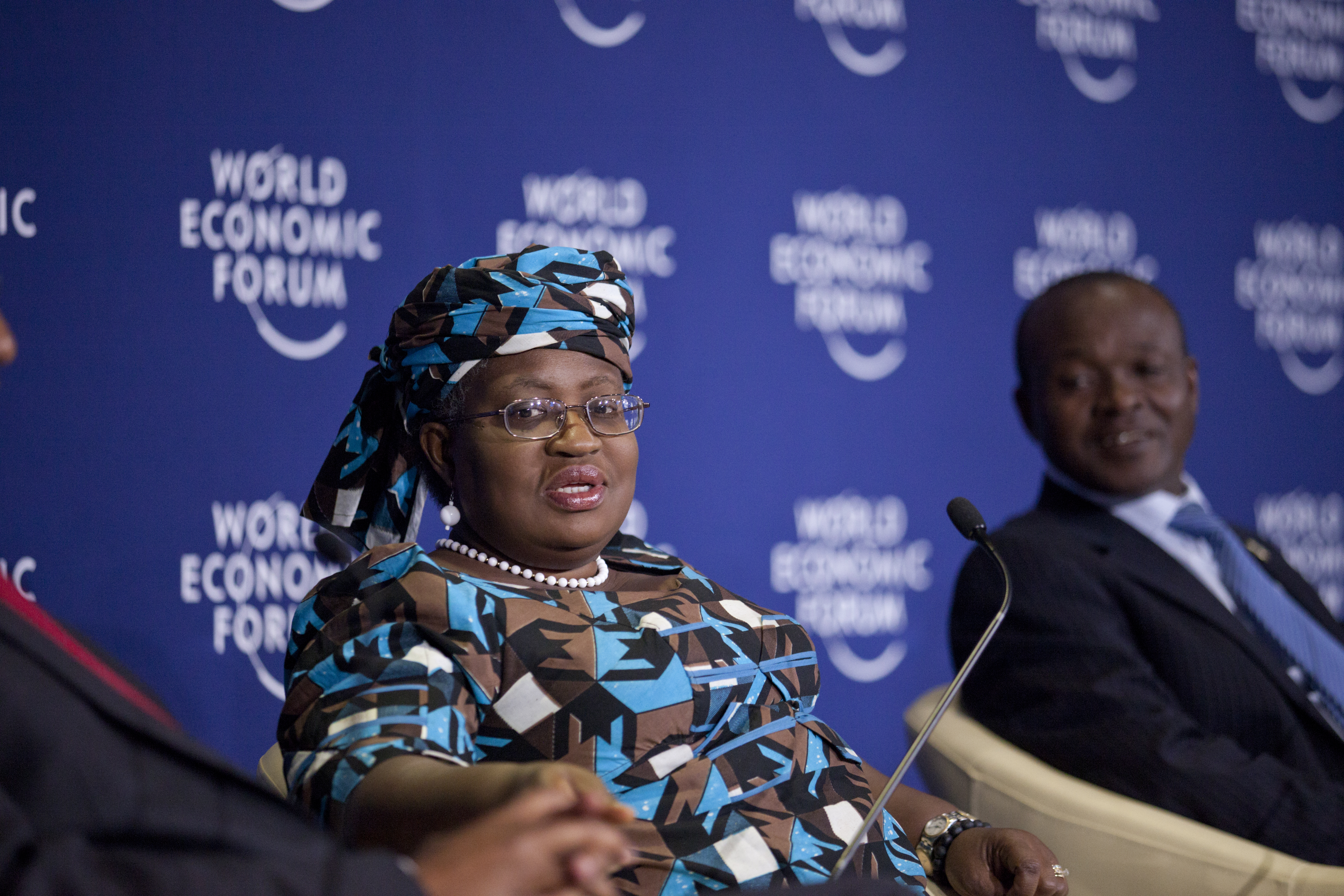

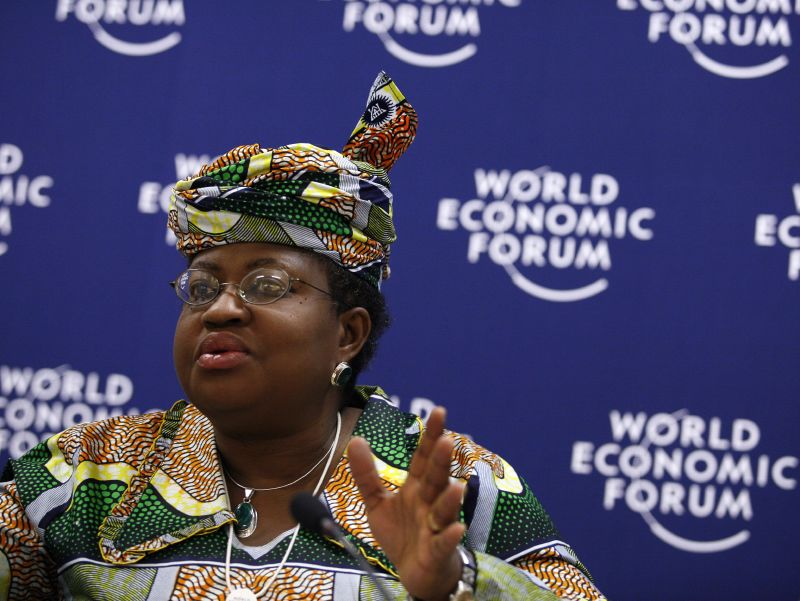
Ngozi Okonjo-Iweala at the 2007 World Economic Forum

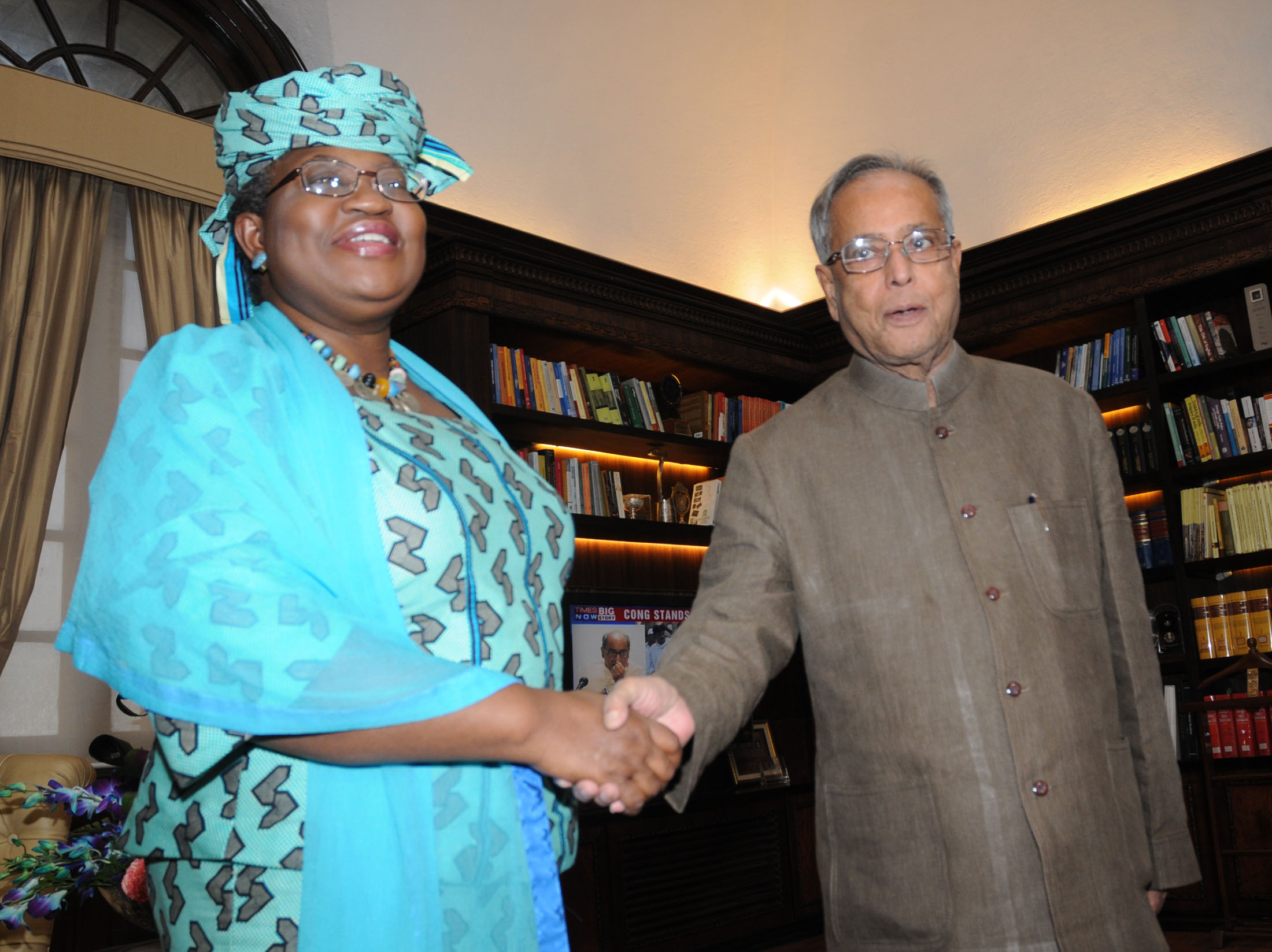
Ms. Ngozi Okonjo-Iweala calls on the Union Finance Minister, 13th President of India Shri Pranab Mukherjee, in New Delhi on May 12, 2011

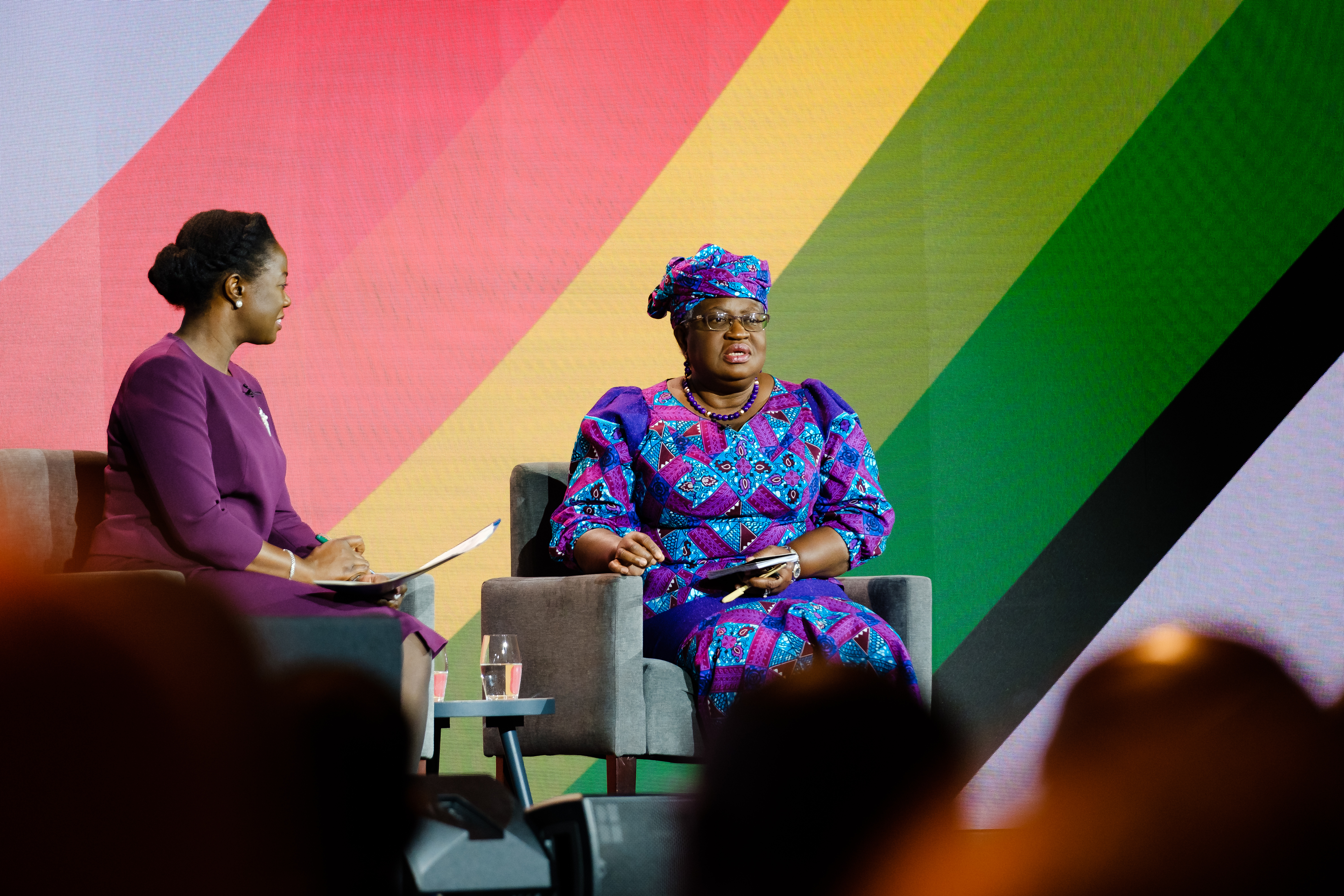
Ngozi Okonjo-Iweala, and former Managing Director of the World Bank, speaking at the UK-Africa Investment Summit in London

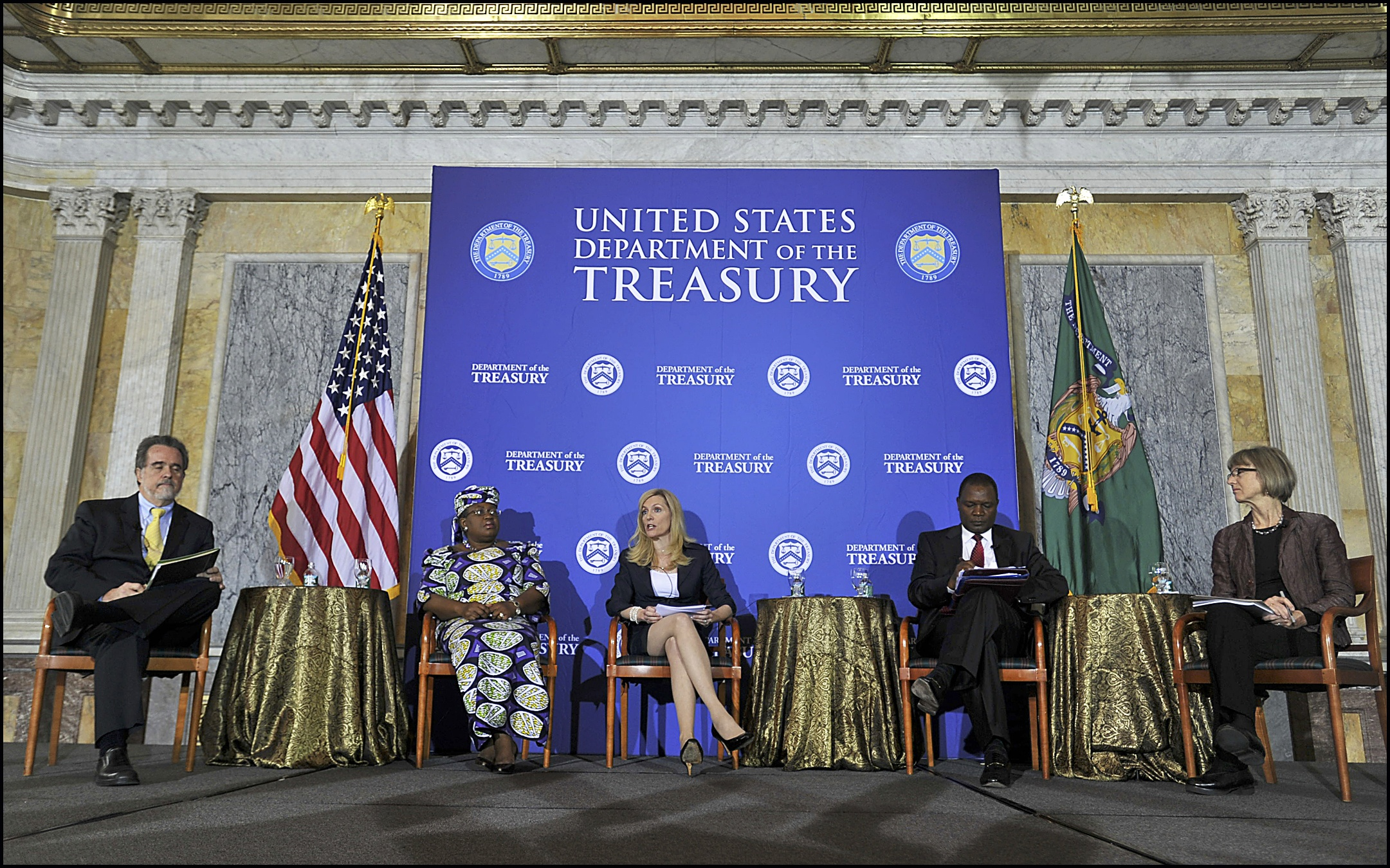

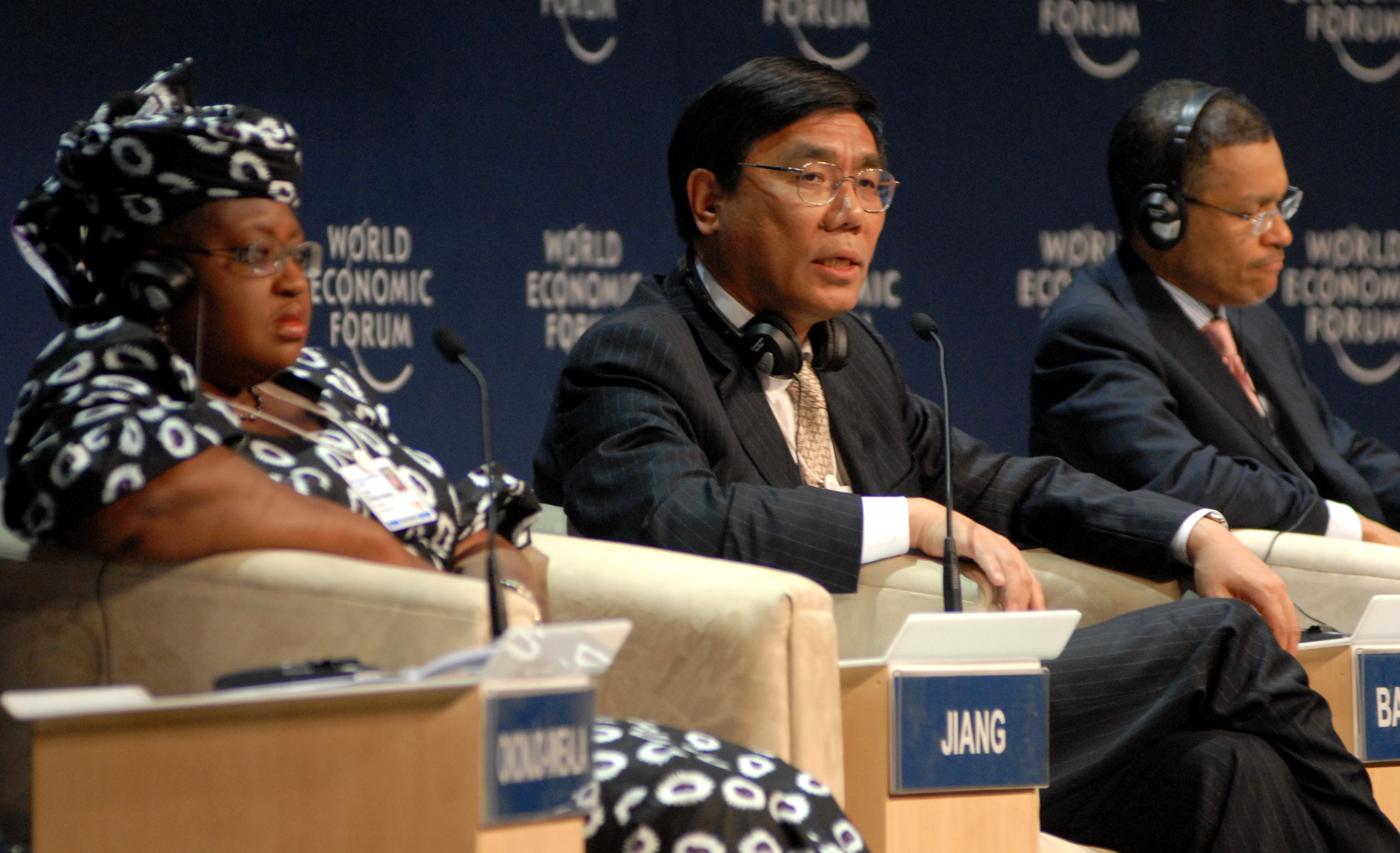

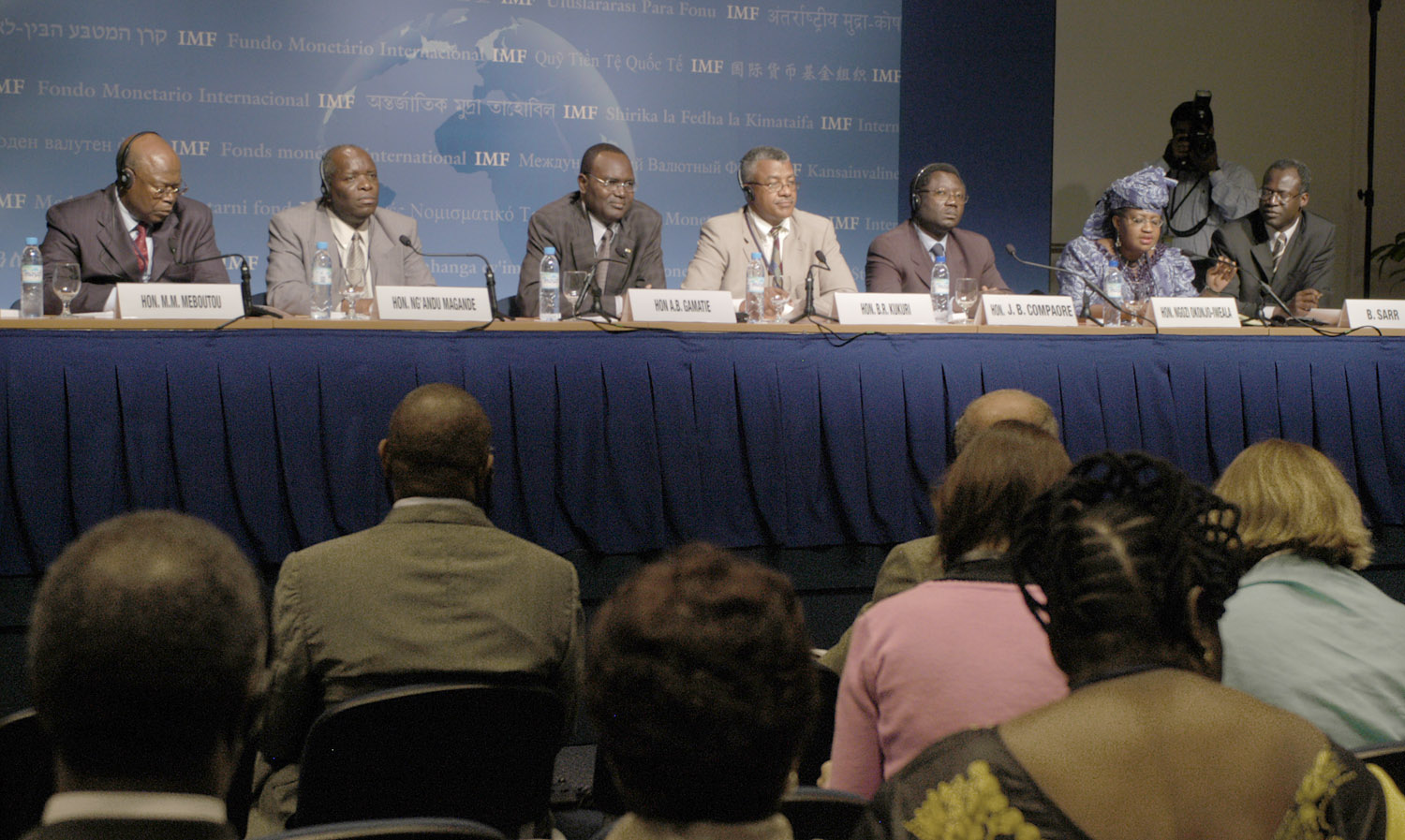

== See also ==
- Finance Minister of Nigeria

Political offices
Preceded by Adamu Ciroma	Minister of Finance; 2003–2006	Succeeded by Nenadi Usman
Preceded by Oluyemi Adeniji	Minister of Foreign Affairs; 2006	Succeeded by Joy Ogwu
Preceded by Olusegun Olutoyin Aganga	Minister of Finance; 2011–2015	Succeeded by Kemi Adeosun
Diplomatic posts
Preceded by Roberto Azevêdo	Director-General of the World Trade Organization; 2021–present	Incumbent
