= NMRC =

NMRC may refer to:

- Maharashtra Metro Rail Corporation (Maha Metro), formerly Nagpur Metro Rail Corporation (NMRC)
- Naval Medical Research Center
- Noida Metro Rail Corporation
- Nigeria Mortgage Refinance Company
