= Sonnie Ayere =

Nigerian investment banker

- Born: Sonnie Babatunde Ayere; London
- Education: University of Dundee; London Business School; Bayes Business School
- Occupation: Investment banker
- Known for: President of Association of Issuing Houses of Nigeria (AIHN), chief executive officer of Dunn Loren Merrifield Group and Redeveloping Nigeria's Bond Market

Sonnie Ayere is a Nigerian investment banker and the chief executive officer of DLM Capital Group (formerly Dunn Loren Merrifield). He has served as [resident of the Association of Issuing Houses of Nigeria (AIHN) and as president of the Finance Houses Association of Nigeria (FHAN). In 2020, he was given the Investment Banking CEO of the Decade by the Banks and other Financial Institutions (BAFI) Awards and the ECOWAS Icon of Societal Development by the West Africa Youth Council for his humanitarian work.

== Early life ==
Born in 1966 at St Mary’s Hospital Paddington, London, he attended St Catherine Model School and Government College, Lagos. He proceeded to attend the University of Dundee, Scotland where he studied financial economics. He studied corporate finance at the London Business School. He also received an MBA from Bayes Business School, City, University of London.

== Career ==
Ayere began his career at HSBC in 1992 before joining NatWest Bank in 1993. He later worked at Sumitomo Mitsui Bank London and BMO Nesbitt Burns in London in structured finance roles.

In 2001, he joined the International Finance Corporation, a member of the World Bank Group, focusing on structured finance for Africa.

Ayere joined United Bank for Africa led by Tony Elumelu in 2005 as Managing Director of UBA Global Markets (later renamed United Capital Plc). In 2009, he founded Dunn Loren Merrifield, now known as DLM Capital, which has expanded to include seven subsidiaries regulated by Nigerian financial authorities such as the Securities and Exchange Commission and the Central Bank of Nigeria. DLM Capital has won several awards under his leadership.

He was inducted into the Chartered Institute of Public Resources Management and Politics (CIPRMP) 2020 Fellowship Hall of Fame.

== Advisory roles ==
Ayere has served as an adviser to various Nigerian government initiatives, including the development of the Nigerian Domestic Bond Market and the establishment of the Nigeria Mortgage Refinance Company (NMRC). He also was credited for redeveloping the domestic bond market in Nigeria

== Recognition ==
In 2020, Business Day's Banks and other Financial Institutions (BAFI) Awards named Ayere the Investment Banking CEO of the Decade. That same year, The West Africa Youth Council recognized him as the ECOWAS Icon of Societal Development.

== Personal life ==
Ayere has three children, Sani-Michael, Sasha-Iman Joyeola and Oluwasunmitomo.

He is a member of Lagos Polo Club, Lagos Motorboat Club, Lagos Jetski Club and Ikoyi Club.
