= Growth Commission =

The Commission on Growth and Development (informally known as the Growth Commission) was an independent body set up by the World Bank chaired by American economist Michael Spence that brought together 22 policymakers, academics, and business leaders to examine various aspects of economic growth and development.

Launched in 2006, the commission set out to take stock of the state of theoretical and empirical knowledge on economic growth with a view to drawing implications for policy for the current and future policymakers. Its work culminated in two publications – The Growth Report: Strategies for Sustained Growth and Inclusive Development in May 2008 and Post-Crisis Growth in Developing Countries: A Special Report of the Commission on Growth and Development on the Implications of the 2008 Financial Crisis in October 2009.

Five thematic volumes and nearly 70 working papers were also published by the Commission.

The commission’s work was sponsored by the governments of Australia, The Netherlands, Sweden and the United Kingdom, the William and Flora Hewlett Foundation, and the World Bank Group.

The group's activities formally ended in June 2010, succeeded by the non-profit think tank The Growth Dialogue.

== Commissioners ==
- Montek Ahluwalia (India), minister of planning
- Edmar Bacha (Brazil), board member of Banco Itau, former president of the National Bank for Economic and Social Development
- Boediono (Indonesia), coordinating minister for economic affairs
- John Browne (Great Britain), former CEO, BP
- Kemal Dervis (Turkey), administrator of the United Nations Development Programme, former minister of finance of Turkey
- Alejandro Foxley, (Chile), minister of foreign affairs
- Goh Chok Tong (Singapore), senior minister and chairman of the Monetary Authority of Singapore
- Han Duck-Soo (Korea), chairman of the Presidential Committee on Facilitating KORUS FTA Finalization
- Danuta Huebner (Poland), member of the European Commission
- Carin Jaemtin (Sweden), former minister for international development cooperation
- Pablo Kuczynski (Peru), former prime minister
- Danny Leipziger (USA), vice president, Poverty Management and Economic Management Network, World Bank
- Trevor Manuel (South Africa), minister of finance
- Mahmoud Mohieldin (Egypt), minister of investment
- Ngozi Okonjo-Iweala (Nigeria), managing director, World Bank
- Robert Rubin (USA), director, chairman of the Executive Committee, and member of the Office of the Chairman of Citigroup, former secretary of the US Treasury
- Robert Solow (USA), professor emeritus, Massachusetts Institute of Technology
- Michael Spence (USA), Nobel Laureate, chair of the Growth Commission, former dean of Stanford Graduate School of Business
- K. Dwight Venner (Saint Kitts and Nevis, West Indies), governor of the Eastern Caribbean Central Bank
- Hiroshi Watanabe (Japan), president and CEO of the Japan Bank for International Cooperation
- Ernesto Zedillo (Mexico), director of the Yale Center for the Study of Globalization, former president of Mexico
- Zhou Xiaochuan (China), governor of the People’s Bank of China
