= Mandela Institute for Development Studies =

South Africa-based think tank

- Founded: 2010
- Founder: Dr Nkosana Moyo
- Type: Non-governmental organisation
- Purpose: Research and Training
- Location: Johannesburg, South Africa
- Website: minds-africa.org

The Mandela Institute for Development Studies (MINDS) is an Africa-wide think tank which provides a forum for dialogue, information dissemination, networking and research on the different elements of Africa. The institutions aims to shape policy and practice on governance, economic development and the evolution of African institutions. It seeks to address the short, medium, and long-term development challenges in Africa in a holistic and comprehensive manner. MINDS is a non-governmental organisation and is based in Johannesburg, South Africa.

== History ==
MINDS was established in 2010 by former Vice President and Chief Operating Officer of the African Development Bank, Dr Nkosana Moyo

== Programmes ==
MINDS programmes focus on four thematic areas, i.e. African Heritage, African Governance and Democracy, Economic Development and Institution Formation/Development. The institution commissions research that may lead to a better understanding of African Heritage to shape the nature of development programmes, lead in to better results relative to those achieved to date. The findings from the research undertaken and/or commissioned by MINDS will be used either as input into dialogues whose proceedings will be published. MINDS will also make existing knowledge more accessible through reviews and consolidation of that knowledge. MINDS convenes dialogues based on the research findings. Dialogues hosted also serves the opportunity for knowledge dissemination, networking and influencing public policy formulation and practice in the thematic areas.

Theme	Description
African Heritage	The African Heritage Programme encompasses learning about Africans and their heritage. The overall aim is a better understanding of African Heritage to shape the nature of development programmes, leading to better results relative to those achieved to date. Key elements to be researched include a map of common identities in Africa; analyses of distinguishing characteristics between cultures and regions; and analyses of knowledge and value systems, institutions customs and governance. MINDS will use this body of knowledge as the filter to test the extent to which development interventions have either used or omitted to use African Heritage as a foundation.
Governance	The Governance programme maps the body of knowledge existing in the area of institution formation and development, analyse institutional systems through an African heritage lens, and engages stakeholders about the findings. The programme area seeks to use the same approach outlined under the African heritage programme to explore effective ways of strengthening African institutions in service to the well-being of citizens.
African Democracy	The African Democracy programme will initially map the body of knowledge existing in the area of governance in Africa, analyze democracy systems through an African heritage lens, and engage stakeholders about the findings. This programme will seek to use the same approach outlined under the African heritage programme for the advancement of democracy.
Economic Development	This programme will initially map the body of knowledge existing in the area of economic development in Africa, analyze economic systems through an African heritage lens, and engage stakeholders about the findings. The overall goal will be to generate new perspectives, approaches and models for advancing economic development in Africa with particular emphasis on broad-based use of African heritage to create ownership of development interventions.

== Board of trustees ==
Nkosana Moyo
Graça Machel
Ali Mufuruki
Sara Menker

== Advisory board ==
Donald Kaberuka
Ngozi Okonjo-Iweala
Francis Daniels
Noureddine Ayed
Adebayo Olukoshi
Thandika Mkandawire
Trevor Manuel

== Patrons ==
Olusegun Obasanjo
Pedro Pires
Benjamin Mkapa
Festus Mogae

== Project partners and associates ==
Shoprite
Old Mutual
Trust Africa
Southern Africa Trust
Grace Machel Trust
The African Capacity Building Foundation
Nelson Mandela Foundation
South African Airways
Musa Capital

== See also ==
- List of charitable foundations
