= Sara Menker =

Ethiopian businesswoman (born 1982)

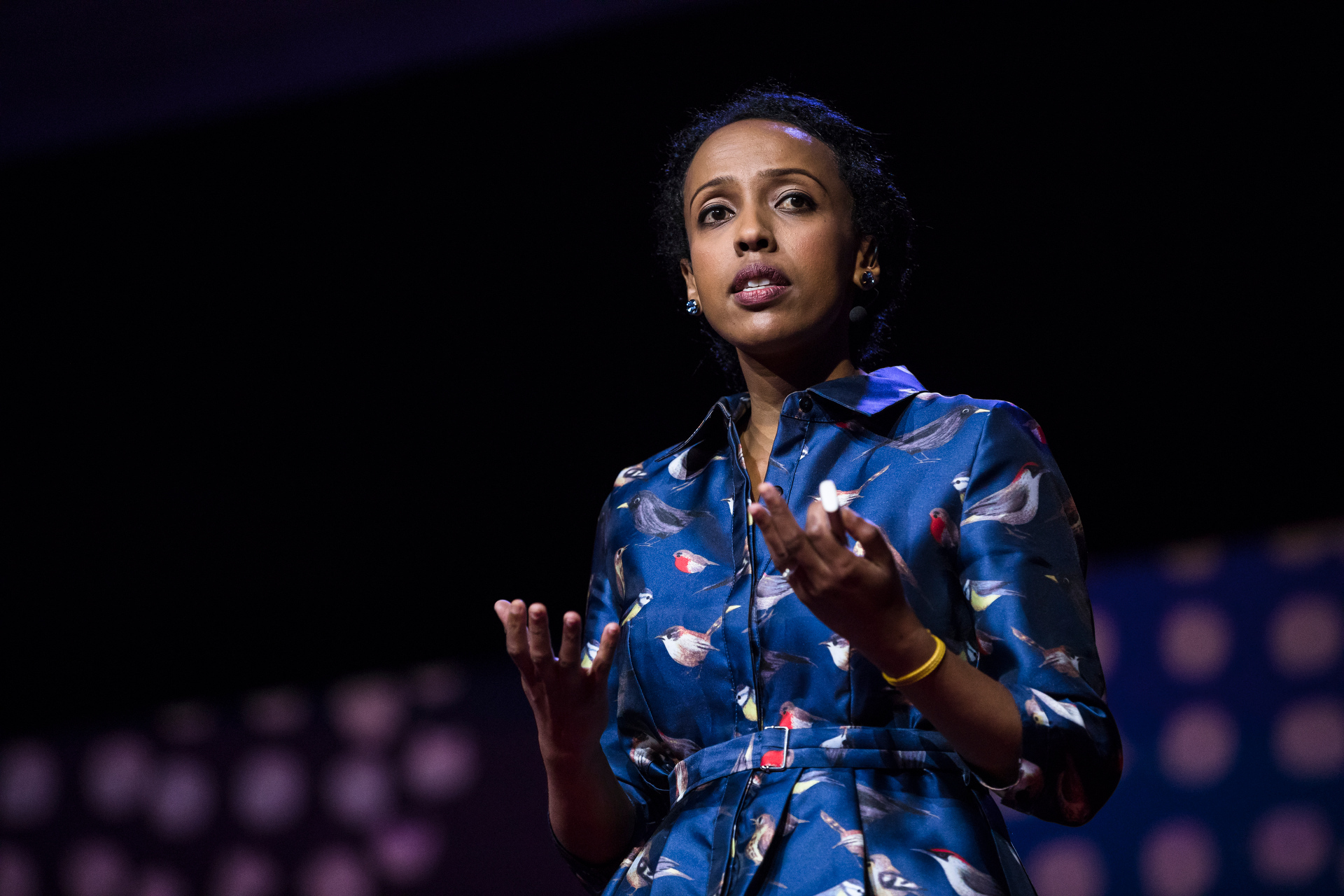
- Menker in 2017
- Born: Ethiopia
- Education: Mount Holyoke College; Columbia University
- Occupation: Entrepreneur
- Employer: Gro Intelligence
- Awards: Young Global Leaders

Sara Menker is an Ethiopian businesswoman and executive who served as the chief executive officer of Gro Intelligence from 2014 until its closure in 2024. She is a trustee of the Mandela Institute for Development Studies and was elected one of the World Economic Forum Young Global Leaders.

== Early life and education ==
Menker grew up in Ethiopia. Her parents were middle class and she attended a private school in Addis Ababa. In her time in Ethiopia, she was exposed to the effects of poverty and famine.

During her high school career, she met an admissions officer from Mount Holyoke College in Massachusetts, which she ultimately decided to attend. There, she got her degree in Economics and African Studies. She later attended the London School of Economics for graduate studies and received her master's degree at Columbia University.

== Career ==
Menker began her career in commodities risk management at Morgan Stanley. She eventually moved through Morgan Stanley to portfolio trading and management. Throughout her work at Morgan Stanley, the issue of food insecurity was constantly on her mind. During her time there, Menker became interested in farmland investments. She left her job in Wall Street in 2014 to use her skills in data analytics for social good. So, she founded Gro Intelligence, a company that leverages artificial intelligence to forecast agricultural trends.

She became concerned by threat of a global food crisis, and started to investigate how Africa could mitigate the Earth's growing demands for food. She estimated that by 2030 food shortages could be as significant as the 2008 financial crisis or dot-com bubble crash. Menker predicts that the world could face a 214 trillion calorie deficit. This is due to systemic issues in the food supply chain, as well as a general increase in population. In 2014 Menker established Gro Intelligence, a data-driven platform which connects food market around the world. Gro Intelligence includes information such as the cost of avocado exports from Mexico and popular coffee beans, and uses artificial intelligence to make predictions about trends in food prices. Gro Intelligence offer software that attempts to make agricultural, weather and climate data easy to understand. The data is combined with satellite imagery and creates over 1,000 models a day. She has used Gro Intelligence to investigate the impact of natural disasters, including droughts, on food supply. The reports inform companies on what and where to sell products, as well as supporting policy makers and insurance companies.

In 2017 Menker delivered a TED talk A global food crisis may be less than a decade away, which has been watched over 1.5 million times. In 2018 Menker was named the Henry C. Gardiner Global Food Systems Lecturer. She has presented at the Rockefeller Foundation, X and The New York Times.

Menker is a trustee of the International Center for Tropical Agriculture and the Mandela Institute for Development Studies. She was selected by the World Economic Forum as a Young Global Leader in 2014. She is also a member of The Aspen Institute African Leadership Initiative. Menker is involved with Cognition X, the artificial intelligence information platform. In 2021, she was included in the Time 100, Time's annual list of the 100 most influential people in the world. In 2021, Menker was selected as a Bloomberg New Economy Catalyst.

In February 2024, Menker was replaced as CEO of Gro Intelligence and in May 2024, the company announced it was closing down.
