= Olusegun Olutoyin Aganga =

Nigerian politician (born 1955)

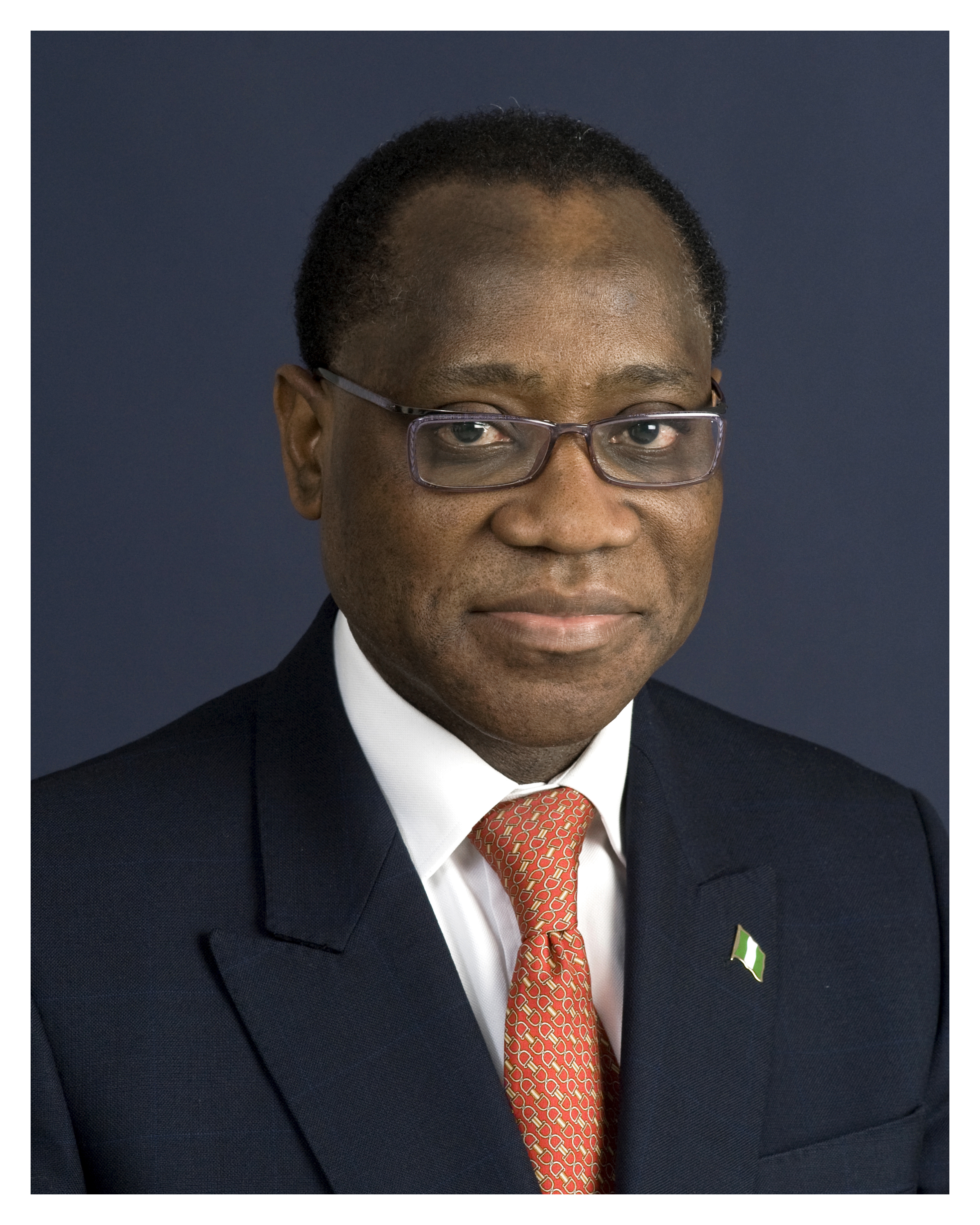

Minister of Industry, Trade and Investment
- In office 11 July 2011 – 29 May 2015
- Succeeded by: Okechukwu Enelamah

Minister of Finance
- In office 6 April 2010 – June 2011
- Preceded by: Mansur Mukhtar
- Succeeded by: Ngozi Okonjo-Iweala

Personal details
- Born: 1955 (age 70–71) Lagos State, Nigeria

Olusegun Olutoyin Aganga (born 1955) is a Nigerian politician who served as the Minister of Industry, Trade, and Investment of Nigeria from 2011 to 2015. He was first nominated by President Olusegun Obasanjo and appointed by President Goodluck Jonathan as the Minister of Finance from 6 April 2010 to June 2011.

== Achievements ==
Mr. Aganga's achievements included establishing Nigeria’s Sovereign Wealth Fund; issuing the Nation's first ever Euro Bond; chairing the World Bank and IMF in 2010, chairing the 8th Ministerial Conference of the World Trade Organization (MC8) in Geneva in 2011 (the first African to chair these organizations).

He was also responsible for structuring and financing the first standard gauge rail (Abuja to Kaduna) in Nigeria. He is also the Chairman of Marina Express, the first private sector developer of rail in Lagos. He sits on a number of Boards including the Advisory Board of the Queens Commonwealth Trust based in the United Kingdom.

Some specific milestone achievements include:

1. Complete transformation of the Federal Government of Nigerian (FGN) Ministry of Trade & Investment (MITI) into Nigeria's number 1 economic ministry.
2. Operationalized Nigeria's debt resolution vehicle, the Asset Management Corporation of Nigeria (AMCON), to improve the liquidity and bring stability into banking industry after the global economic crisis working closely with the Central Bank of Nigeria (CBN).
3. As chair of the WTO MC8 ministerial conference, he laid the foundation for the first WTO trade agreement and also played a pivotal role in finalizing the agreement in Bali, Indonesia, in 2013. This was the first multilateral trade agreement in the 13 years of the WTO.
4. Initiated several policies to diversify the Nigerian economy towards making Nigeria less import dependent and creating jobs. These policies include the auto policy, sugar policy, cotton textile, garment policy, and co-developed a new rice production policy. He fully implemented the cement policy which led to self sufficiency in cement, the end of importation of cement into Nigeria, and for the first time in Nigerian history, companies started exporting cement.
5. Recorded major milestones as the FGN Minister of Trade & Investment which include:
    1. Turning manufacturing into the second fastest growing sector in the Nigerian economy [Nigerian Bureau of Statistics (NBS)]
    2. Mobilized strategic investment and expansions in key strategic sectors where Nigeria was previously import dependent such as (sugarcane to sugar policy), sugar, auto, Petro chemical, refinery, fertilizer and cement.
    3. Recorded significant growth in the number of companies in the Micro, Small & Medium Enterprise (MSME) sector from 17.2 million in 2010 to 32.4 million in 2014, and the attendant employment created by this sector also increased astronomically from 37 million in 2010 to 60 million in 2014 (NBS).
    4. Initiated the countries first national quality infrastructure program with UNIDO.
    5. Reduced business registration cost by 50% for SME's and 25% for large companies. He also established a 24-hour registration service in some commercial cities, and launched an on-line registration platform. He also introduced the visa-on-arrival policy for investors.
    6. During his tenure as Minister of MITI, Nigeria was rated number 1 by the World Street Journal Frontiers Market index as the most watched frontiers market in the world.
    7. NLI was a catalyst for Nigeria's economic vision 20:2020.

== Education and background ==
Aganga was educated at the University of Ibadan, Nigeria where he obtained a B.Sc Degree in Biological Sciences in 1977 and the University of Oxford, United Kingdom where he obtained a degree in Theology in 2000. Aganga qualified as a Chartered Accountant in 1983.

== Professional career ==
His professional career extends over four decades, holding a number of leadership positions both within the private and public sector. Mr. Aganga was previously a Managing Director with Goldman Sachs in London, working in prime brokerage, covering Hedge Funds.

Prior to becoming a Minister, he was Managing Director at Goldman Sachs London, and before that he was a Senior Director at Ernst & Young, London. He was also the Chairman of the Board of Governors of the World Bank and International Monetary Fund (IMF) in 2010 and the Chairman of the World Trade Organization (WTO) in 2011, making him the first African to chair these two organisations.

Within the public sector he served first as Nigeria's Minister of Finance & Chairman Economic Management Team; and then as its Minister of Industry, Trade & Investments.

Currently, Olusegun sits on a number of boards and is an advisor to companies and governments in the UK, US and Nigeria. He is the founder of the Nigeria Leadership Initiative, the Chairman of the board of Leadway Pensure PFA Limited, a board member of Technoserve in the US, an advisory board member of the Queen’s Commonwealth Trust and a member of the Investor Advisory Council of Time Partners in the UK.

== Leadership Initiative and Sovereign Wealth Fund (SWF) ==
In 2006, Aganga founded the Nigerian Leadership Initiative.

Led the establishment of Nigerian Sovereign Wealth Fund.

== Ministerial redeployment ==
In July 2011, Aganga was redeployed by the president to the new Ministry of Trade and Investment, to make way for Ngozi Okonjo-Iweala to return as the Nigerian Minister of Finance. On 9 March 2013, the Nigerian Government changed the name of the Ministry of Trade and Investment to Ministry of Industry, Trade and Investment.

== Personal life ==
Aganga is married to Abiodun Aganga (née Awobokun). He has four children. He is also the brother-in-law to the former military Governor of Kwara State Group Captain Salaudeen Latinwo. His older sister is Mercy Latinwo

== Controversy over Aganga's Ministerial Appointment ==
In 2010, Aganga's ministerial nomination was resisted by the Lagos State chapter of the PDP on the basis that he was filling the Lagos State ministerial slot but had not been born in the state.

In June 2011, again Aganga's ministerial nomination was resisted by the Lagos State chapter of the PDP, but Aganga was approved by senate on 6 July 2011 as Minister.

On both occasions Aganga was nominated as minister by General Obasanjo, the former President of Nigeria.

== Fitch Ratings October 2010 ==
In October 2010, Fitch the rating agency cut the outlook on Nigeria's BB− rating to “negative” from “stable” because of withdrawals from the Excess Crude Account and a drop in foreign currency reserves. Aganga who was at the time, Nigeria's Finance Minister, stated that Fitch Ratings’ action to reduce the outlook on the country's sovereign credit rating was “unduly punitive”.

== Rice Importation Ends in 2014 ==
In October 2011, Aganga, the Nigerian minister for Trade and Investment announced that rice importation in Nigeria will soon by the end of 2014. Nigeria has used various trade policy instruments such as import restrictions, and outright ban on rice import at various times from 1978 to 1995. All have failed.

From October 1978 to April 1979, Nigeria's military government under Gen. Obasanjo, banned imports in containers under 50 kg. In April 1979, the Nigerian government introduced rice imports under restricted license only for Government Agencies. In September 1979, Obasanjo's government introduced a six months ban on all rice imports.

In January 1980 the policy was changed again, by the civilian government of Shehu Shagari, this time the government issued Import license for 200,000 tonnes of rice. In October 1980, the same government changed the policy to no quantitative restrictions on rice under general import license.

In December 1980, Shagari created a Presidential Task Force (PTF) on rice, and it was named the Nigerian National Supply Company to issue allocations to customers and traders. In January 1984, the Military regime of Muhammadu Buhari disbanded PTF on rice and importation was placed under general license restrictions.

In October 1985, a few months after Major General Ibrahim Babaginda appointed himself as President of Nigeria, he imposed a ban on the importation of rice (and maize). During this period, rice was illegally imported into Nigeria through the country's borders.

In 1995 the import ban on rice was removed by the then military President of Nigeria, General Sani Abacha, because local suppliers failed to meet demand.

Since 1995, Nigeria has adopted a more liberal trade policy towards rice, until October 2011, when the civilian government of President Jonathan announced that it was going to ban rice importation in 2014. Nigerians are opposed to the banning of rice importation.

== MITI Workers Protest ==
On 30 July 2013, workers (civil servants) of the Federal Ministry of Industry, Trade and Investment (MITI), Nigeria staged a protest in front of the ministry's head office.

The workers had accused the Permanent Secretary of the Ministry, Dauda Kigbu and his wife, Salma Kigbu, of treating the ministry so badly, stating that such liberties will not be tolerated.

The workers were also protesting poor office structures and poor welfare packages. Aganga responded by saying President Jonathan had set aside N1 billion (Naira) to start new office, for workers of the Federal Ministry of Industry, Trade and Investment, in collaboration with the Saudi Arabian Government.

== Awards ==
In November 2011, Goodluck Ebele Jonathan President of the Federal Republic of Nigeria, conferred on Olusegun Aganga, the National Honour, Commander of the Order of Niger (CON).
