= Okechukwu Enelamah =

Former Nigerian Minister

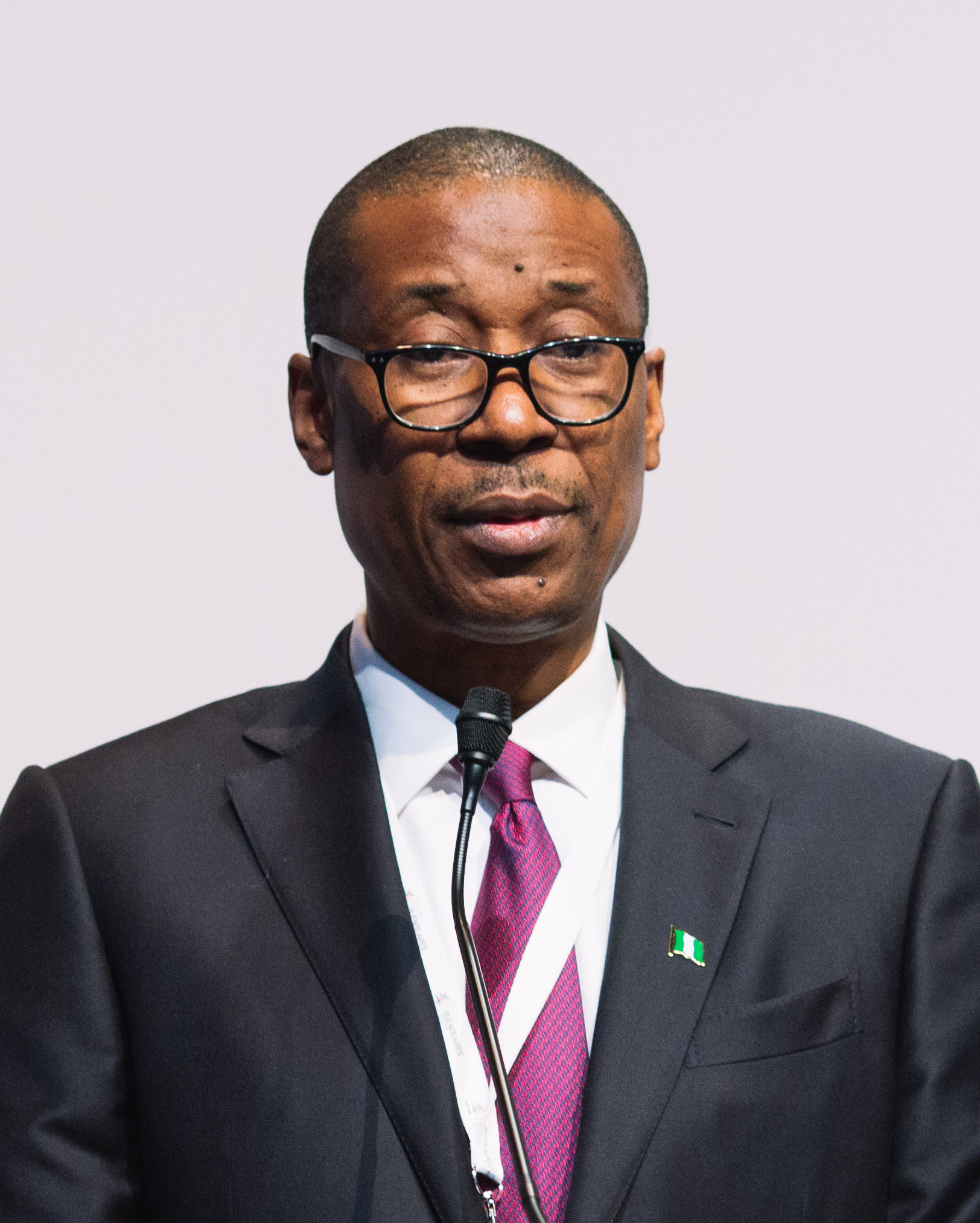
- Okechukwu Enelamah in 2017

Minister of Industry, Trade and Investment
- In office November 2015 – August 2019
- Preceded by: Olusegun Aganga
- Succeeded by: Niyi Adebayo

Personal details
- Born: 1964 (age 61–62)

Okechukwu Enelamah (born 1964) is Nigeria's former Minister of Industry, Trade and Investment. He was nominated by President Muhammadu Buhari to join the Federal Cabinet in October 2015 and appointed to the Industry, Trade, and Investment portfolio in November 2015. He served in this position till 2019.

== Education ==
Enelamah graduated from Government College, Umuahia earned a Bachelor of Medicine, Bachelor of Surgery (MBBS) from the University of Nigeria, Nsukka in 1985. He earned a master's degree in Business Administration (MBA) from Harvard University in 1994 where he was a Baker Scholar and Loeb Fellow. He is a member of ICAN (1992) and became a CFA charterholder in 1997. He earned Dean's List honours in his MBBS graduating class at the University of Nigeria, and was awarded national prizes in the Institute of Chartered Accountants of Nigeria (ICAN) examinations.

== Career ==
Enelamah worked as an Audit Senior and Consultant in 1988 at Arthur Anderson (now KPMG Professional Services). He later worked in New York and London offices of Goldman Sachs in 1993 before joining Zephyr Management as an investment manager where he rose to Principal in the Johannesburg office between 1995 and 1997. Enelamah founded African Capital Alliance (ACA), a private equity firm, in 1997 where he served as CEO until his appointment to the Industry, Trade, and Investment portfolio in November 2015 by President Muhammadu Buhari.
