= Michael Spence =

Canadian-American economist and Nobel Laureate (born 1943)

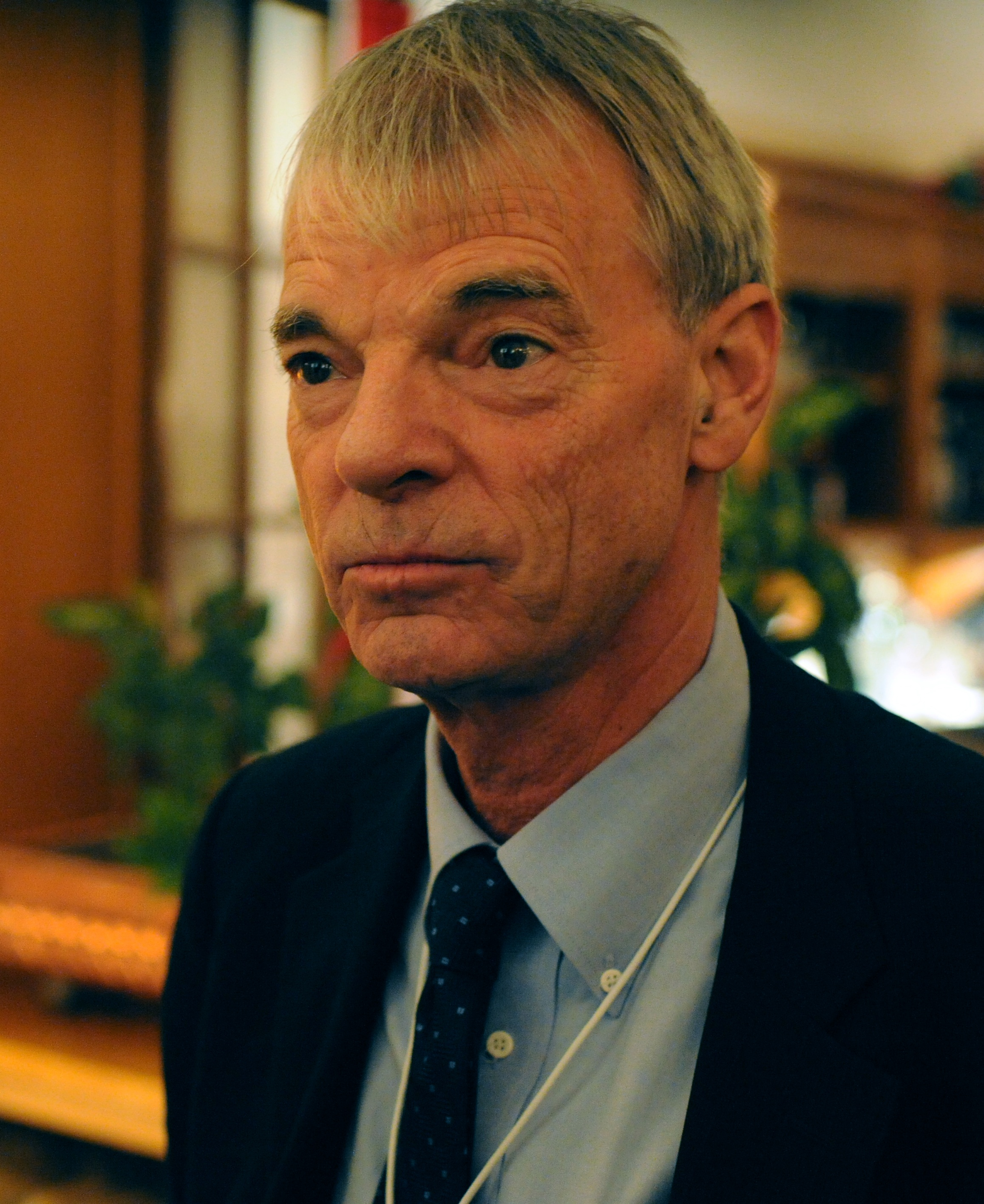
- Spence in 2008
- Born: November 7, 1943 (age 82); Montclair, New Jersey, US

Academic background
- Education: Harvard University, (Ph.D.); University of Oxford, (B.A.); Princeton University, (B.A.)
- Thesis: Market Signalling (1972)
- Doctoral advisor: Kenneth Arrow; Thomas Schelling
- Influences: Richard Zeckhauser

Academic work
- Discipline: Microeconomics, labor economics
- Institutions: Harvard University; Stanford University; SDA Bocconi School of Management; New York University
- Notable ideas: Signaling theory
- Awards: John Bates Clark Medal (1981); Nobel Memorial Prize in Economics (2001)
- Website: Information at IDEAS / RePEc

Andrew Michael Spence (born November 7, 1943) is a Canadian-American economist and Nobel laureate.

Spence is the William R. Berkley Professor in Economics and Business at the Stern School of Business at New York University, and the Philip H. Knight Professor of Management, Emeritus, and Dean, Emeritus, at the Stanford Graduate School of Business.

Together with George A. Akerlof and Joseph E. Stiglitz, Spence is a co-recipient of the 2001 Nobel Memorial Prize in Economic Sciences, "for their analyses of markets with asymmetric information."

== Career ==
Spence is noted for his job-market signaling model, which inspired research into this branch of contract theory. In this model, employees signal their respective skills to employers by acquiring a certain degree of education, which is costly to them. Employers will pay higher wages to more educated employees, because they know that the proportion of employees with high abilities is higher among the educated ones, as it is less costly for them to acquire education than it is for employees with low abilities. For the model to work, it is not even necessary for education to have any intrinsic value if it can convey information about the sender (employee) to the recipient (employer) and if the signal is costly.

Spence received his middle and high school education at the University of Toronto Schools. He later joined the Rotman School of Management at the University of Toronto as a member of the Rotman Dean's Advisory Board.

Spence attended Princeton University as an undergraduate student and graduated summa cum laude with a B.A. in philosophy in 1966, completing a senior thesis titled "Freedom and Determinism". Spence then studied at Magdalen College, University of Oxford as a Rhodes Scholar, and received a B.A./M.A. in mathematics in 1968. Spence then began graduate studies in economics at Harvard University with the support of a Danforth Graduate Fellowship in the fall of 1968. He received a Ph.D. in economics in 1972, completing a dissertation titled "Market signalling" under the supervision of Kenneth Arrow and Thomas C. Schelling. Spence was awarded the David A. Wells Prize for outstanding doctoral dissertation in 1972.

He stepped down as Dean of the Stanford Graduate School of Business in 1999 and joined Oak Hill Capital Partners. He is the Chairman of the Commission on Growth and Development, and a distinguished visiting fellow at the Council on Foreign Relations.

Spence joined the faculty of New York University's Stern School of Business on September 1, 2010. He joined the faculty of SDA Bocconi School of Management in Italy in July 2011.

He is a senior fellow at Stanford University's Hoover Institution and the Philip H. Knight Professor Emeritus of Management in the Graduate School of Business. Spence is also a Commissioner for the Global Commission on Internet Governance. Additionally, Spence is also a member of the Berggruen Institute's 21st Century Council.

He is the author of three books and 50 articles, and has also been a consistent contributor to Project Syndicate, an international newspaper syndicate, since 2008. Among his beliefs are that high-frequency trading should be banned.

Spence had both Bill Gates and Steve Ballmer in a graduate-level economics class at Harvard. In a 1999 Fortune interview, however, Gates and Ballmer admitted not attending class and passing only after cramming for four days before the final.

== Honors and awards ==
Spence is an Honorary Fellow of Magdalen College, Oxford, where he studied as a Rhodes Scholar. He was the recipient of the Nobel Memorial Prize in Economic Sciences in 2001, as well as the John Bates Clark Medal from the American Economics Association in 1981.

Spence was elected as a Fellow of the Econometric Society in 1976 and a member of the American Academy of Arts and Sciences in 1983.

== Selected works ==
- Spence, Michael (1973). "Job Market Signaling". Quarterly Journal of Economics. 87 (3): 355–374. doi:10.2307/1882010. JSTOR 1882010.
- Market Signaling: Informational Transfer in Hiring and Related Screening Processes. Cambridge, MA: Harvard University Press. 1974. ISBN 978-0674549906.
- The Next Convergence: The Future of Economic Growth in a Multispeed World. New York: Farrar, Straus and Giroux. May 2011. ISBN 978-1429968713.

== Personal life ==
Spence currently lives in Milan, Italy with his wife and children.

== See also ==
- List of economists

Awards
Preceded by James J. Heckman; Daniel L. McFadden	Laureate of the Nobel Memorial Prize in Economics; 2001; Served alongside: George A. Akerlof, Joseph E. Stiglitz	Succeeded by Daniel Kahneman; Vernon L. Smith
