= Nigeria Mortgage Refinance Company =

- Type: Public limited company
- Industry: Financial services
- Founded: 24 June 2013; 13 years ago
- Headquarters: Victoria Island, Lagos, Nigeria, Nigeria
- Website: www.nmrc.com.ng

The Nigeria Mortgage Refinance Company Plc (NMRC) is a Nigerian financial services company that was established to develop both the primary and secondary mortgage markets in Nigeria. Although set up as a company, it is a partnership between the Nigerian government and entities, such as primary mortgage banks, insurance companies, private equity investors and international financial institutions.

The NMRC encourages lenders to provide mortgages by providing long-term funding at an affordable rate, as well buying mortgages from the primary lenders to grow the mortgage market, using long term funds raised on capital markets.

NMRC was set up to bridge the funding cost of residential mortgages and increase the availability and affordability of good housing to Nigerians by providing increased liquidity in the mortgage market through the mortgage and commercial banks.

== History ==
Nigeria Mortgage Refinance Company (NMRC) was incorporated as a public limited liability company licensed to provide mortgage-lending institutions with access to long-term finance at an affordable interest rate, thereby enabling mortgages to be issued by these institutions to Nigerians, at longer tenors and affordable rates.

NMRC obtained an Approval-in-principle from the CBN on 20 June 2013. The company became incorporated on 24 June 2013 as Nigeria Mortgage Refinance Company Plc and were issued their license for operations on February 18, 2015.

== Leadership ==
The NMRC’s board of directors are responsible for the formulation of policies and strategies of the Company. They are drawn from member companies, the Nigerian government and major industry people.

As of 2023, the board consists of:

Name of board member	Position at the NMRC	Other commitment
Mr. Charles Adeyemi Candide-Johnson	Chairman	Senior partner at Strachan Partners
Mr. Kehinde Ogundimo	Chief executive officer	
Mrs. Fatima Wali-Abdurrahman	Non-executive director	Professional architect
Dr. Femi Johnson	Non-executive director	Managing director/CEO Home Base Mortgage Bank Limited
Mr. Alexander Adeyemi	Non-executive director	Distinguished fellow of the National Institute
Mr. Razack Adeyemi Adeola	Non-executive director	Group managing director / CEO Sterling Bank Plc
Dr. Olabanjo Obaleye	Non-executive director	Managing director / CEO of Infinity Trust Mortgage Bank PLC
Dr. Herbert Wigwe	Non-executive director	Group managing director, Access Bank Plc.
Mr. Aminu Umar-Sadiq	Non-executive director	Managing director / CEO of the Nigeria Sovereign Investment Authority

== Recognition ==
Nigeria Mortgage Refinance Company (NMRC) received the given the 'Mortgage Bank/Product of the Year' category at the eighth edition of the African Banker Awards held in Kigali, Rwanda in 2014.

== Members ==
The Nigeria Mortgage Refinance Company Plc (NMRC) has about 20 member mortgage lending banks;

- Sterling Bank Plc
- Access Bank Plc
- Heritage Bank Plc
- Stanbic IBTC Bank Plc
- Infinity Trust Mortgage Bank Plc.
- Homebase Mortgage Limited
- FHA Homes Savings & Loans Limited
- Trust Bond Mortgage Bank
- Imperial Homes Mortgage Bank
- Abbey Mortgage Bank Plc
- Resort Savings & Loans Limited
- Platinum Mortgage Bank Limited
- Jubilee Life Savings & Loans Limited
- Haggai Savings & Loans Limited
- Refuge Home Savings & Loans Limited
- New Prudential Building Society
- Sun Trust Bank
- Nigeria Police Mortgage Bank Limited
- Mayfresh Savings & Loans Limited

== Refinancing Cycle ==
The way NMRC achieves its objectives is as follows. The initial step is for a borrower to take out a mortgage loan from a participating mortgage lender based on the uniform underwriting criteria set by NMRC; in return the borrower will provide regular repayments of the loan principal plus interest. The borrower will also provide collateral in the form of a mortgage over the property to be purchased.

Second step is for the participating mortgage lenders to refinance the loans with NMRC. NMRC will refinance the mortgage loans of banks with recourse to the financial institutions. The participating mortgage lender will in turn, provide security over its mortgage portfolio in favour of NMRC.

The third step is for NMRC to raise its own funding by accessing the capital markets and issuing bonds. It will issue corporate bonds, which do not involve any pass through of the credit risk attached to the mortgages. NMRC acts as a simple intermediary between mortgage lenders and the capital markets. By using its size and credit worthiness, NMRC is able to raise funds at a cheaper rate for longer duration. This is attributable to the shareholders, capital base, quality of assets in its books and that it is regulated by the CBN and the SEC.
