= John Awuah =

Ghanaian banking executive

- Born: John Awuah
- Education: University of Cape Coast (BComm); Oxford Brookes University (MBA)
- Occupation: banker
- Years active: 2001– present
- Employer(s): Formerly Universal Merchant Bank, Ghana Commercial Bank, United Bank for Africa
- Title: CEO, Ghana Association of Banks
- Predecessor: D. K. Mensah
- Board member of: Ghana Investment Promotion Centre (GIPC)

John Awuah is a Ghanaian banking executive who is CEO of the Ghana Association of Banks, an umbrella association of commercial banks in Ghana. He assumed this position in August 2020, having been appointed as deputy CEO of the association months earlier to his current role. Previously, he was CEO of UMB from 2015 to 2019, CFO of GCB Bank from 2013 to 2015, and Group CFO of Ecobank Capital from 2012 to 2013.

== Early life and education ==
John Awuah was born in Ghana and grew up in a household where his parents had no formal education, and he was the first in his family to attend senior high school and eventually obtain a university education.

Awuah was educated at Osei Tutu Senior High School. He received a Bachelor of Commerce degree with first-class honors from the University of Cape Coast in Ghana, and later obtained an MBA with merit from Oxford Brookes University, United Kingdom. Awuah's qualifications also include being a Fellow of the Association of Chartered Certified Accountants, United Kingdom, and membership of the Institute of Chartered Accountants of Ghana.

== Career ==
Awuah began his career with roles at Tractor & Equipment Ghana (now Mantrac) and Western Castings Limited, gaining early exposure to financial operations. He moved on to hold senior positions at multiple commercial banks in Ghana, starting off as a Finance Business Partner at Standard Chartered Bank Ghana from March 2003 to March 2005, before exiting to take up the Chief Finance Officer (CFO) role at the Ghana subsidiary of Nigerian headquartered United Bank for Africa. He stayed as CFO of United Bank for Africa Ghana from June 2005 to February 2008.

He switched banks moving to work for Barclays Bank of Ghana (Absa Ghana) as Financial Controller. In 2010 he was seconded to Barclays Bank Egypt to assist the business in designing and rolling out its financial controls framework after which he was assigned to the Barclays Africa Regional Office in Dubai as a project lead on Management of Control Issues in ten Barclays Africa countries.

In August 2012, he joined Ecobank Group and was appointed as Group Chief Finance Officer at Ecobank Capital, the investment banking arm of the banking institution. Awuah oversaw finance functions across seven countries, including Ghana, Nigeria, Côte d'Ivoire, Cameroon, Kenya, and Zimbabwe. He joined GCB Bank, Ghana's largest bank by branch networks, in March 2013 and exited the bank in April 2015. He was the bank's CFO and was an executive director of the board at GCB Bank.

From April 2015 to February 2019, Awuah was the CEO of Universal Merchant Bank (UMB). During his tenure, he led the bank from consistent losses to profitability within 18 months, implementing strategies with both private and public sector partnerships. His leadership earned him the Finance Personality of the Year award at the 4th Ghana Finance Innovation Awards in 2018.

In 2020, Awuah was appointed deputy CEO of the Ghana Association of Banks, succeeding D. K. Mensah as CEO later that year.
