= Transcorp Power Plc =

Thermal plant in Ughelli, Nigeria

- Company type: Company
- Industry: Power
- Headquarters: Ughelli, Delta, Nigeria
- Key people: Emmanuel Nnorom, Chairman; Peter Ikenga, CEO
- Products: Power
- Website: https://transcorppower.com/

Transcorp Power Plc is a gas-fired thermal plant located in Ughelli, Delta State in the Niger Delta region of Nigeria. It is a subsidiary of Transnational Corporation Plc. Founded on September 24, 2012, as Transcorp Ughelli Power Limited. It is the largest fossil-fuel based power-generating station in the country. The plant has an installed capacity of 972 MW (1,303,000 hp) and is capable of generating 2,500 GWh of electricity annually.

The plant meets current world specifications for plants of its type and includes an updated control room, a switchgear room, a staff training school, and recreational facilities.

Most of the electricity produced by Ughelli is transported through a network of conductors, to the national grid.

The plant is an asset of Transnational Corporation of Nigeria Plc (Transcorp)’s power subsidiary, Transcorp Ughelli Power Limited (Transcorp Power).

In March 2024, the company became publicly listed on the Nigerian Exchange.

== History ==
The station was built in 1964 with an installed capacity of 2X36MW or 72 MW (97,000 hp) from two Stal-Laval gas turbines and began operations in 1966. Then the station was called Delta I under the Electricity Corporation of Nigeria (ECN), a precursor to the Nigerian Electric Power Authority (NEPA) and its successor, the Power Holding Company of Nigeria (PHCN).

In 1975, six units of General Electric (GE) Frame 5 gas turbines (20 MW or 27,000 hp each) were installed in the station known as Delta II, after the merger of Niger Dam Authority (NDA), Kainji, and the ECN to form the National Electric Power Authority (NEPA).

In 1978, an additional six units of GE Frame 5 gas turbines, like the ones installed in 1975, were added to Delta Power Station (Known as Delta III) to boost the installed capacity to a total of 312 MW (418,000 hp). In 1991, six 100 MW or 130,000 hp (600 MW or 800,000 hp) GE Frame 9 gas turbines were added. From 2000 to 2008 Delta II and Delta III GE units were upgraded to 150 MW (200,000 hp) stations each: built by Hitachi. The control systems were upgraded to Mark V, a fully computerized control system for Delta II and III. While Delta I was scrapped. Delta IV control system was also upgraded to Mark V by GE of USA which built the station.

On 25 September 2012, Transcorp Ughelli Power Limited (TUPL) (which comprises Wood Rock Energy Resources Limited, Symbion Power LLC, Thomassen Holding Limited, Medea Development S.A., Tenoil Petroleum and Energy Services Limited and PSL Engineering and Control Limited) won the $300m bid for the acquisition of the Ughelli Power Plant, one of the six power generation companies of the Power Holding Company of Nigeria (PHCN) being privatized by the Federal Government of Nigeria. Symbion Power was divested in September 2015.

On 1 November 2013, Transcorp Power officially took physical ownership of Ughelli Power Plc, the owner and operator of Ughelli Power Plant following a handover ceremony hosted by the Federal Government of Nigeria.
