= United Bank =

United Bank may refer to:

- United Bank of Albania
- United Bank of India
- United Bank for Africa (Kenya)
- United Bank for Africa, Nigeria
- United Bank Limited, Pakistan
- United Bank of Switzerland (UBS)
- United Bank for Africa (Uganda)
- United Bank (Atlanta metropolitan area), Georgia, U.S.
- United Bank (West Virginia), U.S.
- United Bank of Arizona, acquired by Citibank, then Norwest
