= Elumelu =

Elumelu is a surname. Notable people with the surname include:

- Awele Elumelu (born 1970), Nigerian physician and business executive
- Ndudi Elumelu (born 1965), Nigerian politician
- Tony Elumelu (born 1963), Nigerian banker
- Uche Chika Elumelu, Nigerian actress
