= Chioma Mang =

Nigerian lawyer and corporate executive

Chioma A. Mang
- Born: Chioma A. Mang; 1966 (age 59–60); Nigeria
- Education: University of Reading (Bachelor of Laws); University College London (Master of Laws); Nigerian Law School (Professional bar course)
- Occupations: Lawyer and corporate executive
- Years active: 1990–present
- Title: Managing director of United Bank for Africa Uganda Limited

Chioma A. Mang (born c.1966) is a Nigerian lawyer and corporate executive, who served as the chief executive officer and managing director of United Bank for Africa Uganda Limited from December 2020 until October 2024. Prior to then, she was the managing director and CEO of United Bank for Africa's subsidiary in Gabon.

In January 2024, the Central Bank of Nigeria (CBN) appointed her as the executive director of Keystone Bank Limited, a commercial bank in Nigeria. However, she declined that appointment and the CBN named a replacement.

== Background and education ==
Mang was born in Nigeria circa 1966.

She holds a Bachelor of Laws degree, obtained from the University of Reading, in the United Kingdom. Her degree of Master of Laws was awarded by the University College London, in 1988. She also obtained professional legal training at the Nigerian Law School and was admitted to the Nigerian Bar in 1990.

== Career ==
In 1990, after admission to the Bar in Nigeria, Mang joined Midas Merchant Bank. Later, she transferred to Chartered Bank, working there in marketing and operations. In 1999, she joined the UBA Group. After working in various capacities, she was appointed CEO of the UBA subsidiary in Liberia, in 2011. In 2016, she was transferred to Gabon, in the same capacity.

As CEO of UBA Gabon, she led the bank's response to the COVID-19 outbreak in the country. UBA Gabon, donated CFA90 million (€137,000), to the country's pandemic fund, being the first commercial bank to do so.

In July 2020, Mang was appointed to replace Johnson Agoreyo, who served as CEO at the Ugandan subsidiary from June 2016 until September 2020. Agoreyo is credited with turning around the loss-making Ugandan unit in 2017. UBA Uganda was also profitable in 2018 and 2019.

In January 2024, as part of the re-organization of the Nigerian banking system, the Central Bank of Nigeria, named Mang as the executive director of Keystone Bank, to deputize the newly appointed CEO, Hassan Imam. However, Mang turned down that appointment and stayed on as CEO/MD at UBA Uganda. In Q4 2024, she was re-assigned to a higher managerial post at UBA Bank Group headquarters in Lagos, Nigeria, effective, 1 October 2024.

== Personal life ==
Mang is a married Christian mother of three children.
