= Mavis Nduchwa =

Botswana entrepreneur

- Born: Mavis Nduchwa; August 28, 1982; Francistown, Botswana
- Died: August 13, 2021 (aged 38); Botswana
- Other name: Rewana Nduchwa
- Education: Bachelor's degree in Real Estate and Hospitality Management
- Occupation: Entrepreneur
- Employer: Chabana Farms
- Organization(s): Chabana Farms; Kalahari Honey
- Known for: Founder and CEO of Chabana Farms (Kalahari Honey)
- Notable work: Kalahari Honey social enterprise
- Title: Founder and CEO
- Children: 2
- Awards: Women Empower UN SDG Challenge Winner (Sub-Saharan Africa, 2020) Africa Business Heroes finalist (2020)                       Woman Owned Business of the Year Botswana (Grant Thornton, 2019)                       Botswana Innovation Award (2019) Most Outstanding African Entrepreneur Award (2018)

Mavis Nduchwa, also known as Rewana Nduchwa (28 August 1982 – 13 August 2021), was the founder and CEO of the agribusiness Chabana Farms, which also trades as Kalahari Honey. She was a Motswana entrepreneur, one of the 2020 Jack Ma Foundation top 50 Africa Business Heroes finalists.

== Background and education ==
Mavis Nduchwa was born in 1983, in Francistown, Botswana, and held a bachelor's degree in real estate and hospitality management.

== Career ==
Nduchwa was the founder and CEO of Chabana farms, which trades as Kalahari Honey. The Kalahari Honey business model revolves around solving the human-elephant conflict in Botswana. Her company identifies farmers to set up beehives as a way of mitigating crop damage. Through her business model she sought to study ways of increasing the bee populations. Her social enterprise Kalahari Honey supplies beehives to women in rural areas as a means of protecting their farmlands from elephants.

Nduchwa was the 2020 Women Empower UN SDG challenge winner for Sub- Saharan Africa, a global award for women in business and 2019 AFRINIC (African Network Information Center) fellow. In 2017 she was among the Tony Elumelu Foundation winners, where she was selected for the Mandela Washington Fellow initiative, Young African Leaders Initiative (YALI) fellow.

Nduchwa received the 2019 Woman Owned Business of the Year Botswana (Grant Thornton), Most Outstanding African Entrepreneur Award 2018 (Tony Elumelu Foundation) and Botswana Innovation Award 2019. In 2017 she was selected for the Tony Elumelu Entrepreneurship Program in which African business are selected based on merit and receive entrepreneurship training and a $5000 grant. In 2019, Nduchwa was featured in the Food Chain Global Champion as a guest judge with Samin Nosrat, Gaggan Anand, Marion Nestle and Arnold Kreilhuber.

== Personal life ==
Nduchwa was married and had two sons. She died of complications from COVID-19 in 2021.
