= Transcorp Hilton Hotel =

Nigerian hospitality company

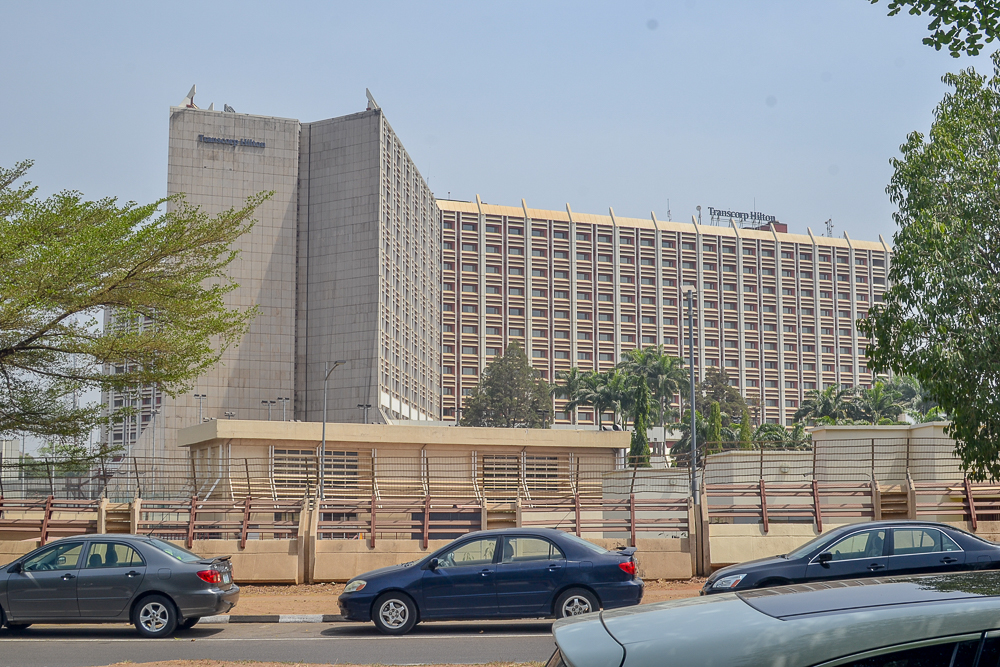
Image of Transcorp Hilton, Abuja

Transcorp Hotel Plc (commonly reported as Transcorp Hilton Hotel, Transcorp Hilton Abuja) is a Nigerian hospitality company that owns Transcorp Hilton Abuja.

== History ==
Transcorp Hotel officially opened its doors to its first guest on April 21, 1987. Built on 20 hectares of land, the hotel initially began operations as Nicon Hilton Hotel, becoming a member of the Hilton brands. Over the years, Transcorp Hotel has hosted numerous events, including the ECOWAS, World Economic Forum, Miss World Pageant, and the Commonwealth Heads of Government Meeting.

In 2005, the Federal Government of Nigeria privatized NIRMSCO Properties Limited, the then owner of the Nicon Hilton Hotel. As part of a consortium, Transcorp purchased a proprietary stake in the company and became the core investor, while the federal government retained the remaining 49%. Hilton International was engaged to manage the property.

NIRMSCO Properties Limited was changed to Transnational Hotels & Tourism Services Limited (THTSL) in 2007. THTSL was the hospitality subsidiary of Transcorp. In 2013, Transcorp bought out other consortium members and became the sole owner of the 51% controlling shares in THTSL. THTSL was rebranded Transcorp Hotels Plc in 2014, ahead of an initial public offering in October 2014.

In 2020, due to the impact of the COVID-19 pandemic, Transcorp Hotel reduced its workforce by about 40 percent and all executives took a pay cut as a result of significant losses.

In January 2025, Uzo Oshogwe was appointed as the new Managing Director/Chief Executive Officer of Transcorp Hotel, the hospitality subsidiary of Transnational Corporation Plc. She succeeded Dupe Olusola, who had served in the role since March 25, 2020.

Transcorp Hotel ended 2023 as the best–performing stock on the Nigerian Stock Exchange with a yearly gain of 1022.9%. In Transcorp Hotels Plc became the first Nigerian hospitality group to cross the ₦1 trillion market capitalization level, entering the SWOOTs (Stocks Worth Over One Trillion) group on the Nigerian Stock Exchange.

In April 2024, Transcorp Hotels Plc finalized its decision to divest its entire equity holdings in its Calabar subsidiary, Transcorp Hotels Calabar.

== Awards ==
At the 2022 World Travel Awards, Transcorp Hotel won for the eighth year in a row, in four categories: Africa's Leading Business Hotel, Nigeria's Leading Business Hotel, Nigeria's Leading Hotel, and Nigeria's Leading Hotel Suite. It also received the award for Nigeria's Leading City Hotel for the first time. In 2024, Transcorp Hotel won Booking.com's Traveller Review Awards 2024.
