= Awele Elumelu =

Nigerian physician and businesswoman

Awele Elumelu OFR
- Born: Awele Vivien Elumelu; 23 June 1970 (age 56); Lagos State, Nigeria
- Citizenship: Nigeria
- Occupations: Physician, Entrepreneur, Philanthropist
- Known for: Chairperson, Avon Healthcare, Avon Medical and Transcorp Hotels, Co-founder, Tony Elumelu Foundation and wife of Tony Elumelu
- Spouse: Tony Elumelu
- Children: 7

Awele Vivien Elumelu OFR (born 23 June 1970) is a Nigerian physician and business executive who chairs Avon Healthcare Limited and Avon Medical Practice, and holds non-executive positions at Heirs Holdings and other organizations. She is also the co-founder of the Tony Elumelu Foundation, which supports entrepreneurship in Africa.

== Early life and education ==
Elumelu was born in Lagos State, Nigeria, on 23 June 1970. She attended Queen's College, Lagos. and graduated with a Bachelor of Medicine and Bachelor of Surgery (MBBS) degrees from the University of Benin. She has practised medicine in both Nigeria and the United Kingdom, including at the Lagos University Teaching Hospital and Grantham and District Hospital.

== Career ==
Elumelu is a medical practitioner and healthcare executive. Her work and advocacy focus on healthcare infrastructure, medical insurance access, and healthcare service delivery.

=== Avon Medical Practice ===
In 2013, she founded Avon Medical and began operations as a network of clinics and medical centres. Since its founding, the organisation has expanded to provide services in various specialities, including diagnostics, wellness, and preventive healthcare.

=== Avon Healthcare Limited ===
In 2013, she founded Avon Healthcare Limited, a health maintenance organisation (HMO) in Nigeria. Through Avon HMO, she oversees the provision of health insurance products tailored to various sectors of the Nigerian population.

=== Heirs Insurance Brokers ===
In addition to healthcare, Dr Elumelu has a strong presence in the insurance industry as the Chairperson of Heirs Insurance Brokers, further strengthening her impact on the business landscape.

=== Heirs Holdings ===
She serves as a Non-Executive Director at Heirs Holdings, a pan-African family-owned investment company committed to driving economic growth across the African continent.

Heirs Holdings was founded in 2010 and maintains a portfolio of investments across several sectors, including Healthcare, Financial Services, Real Estate & Hospitality, Energy, and technology.

=== The Tony Elumelu Foundation ===
In 2010, together with her husband, Tony, they also co-founded the Tony Elumelu Foundation, an African-based philanthropy empowering a new generation of African entrepreneurs out of their commitment to fostering economic development and social impact initiatives in Africa in line with their economic philosophy of Africapitalism. The Foundation has empowered over 400,000 young African men and women across all 54 African countries with non-refundable grants, mentorship, and business training.

=== Transcorp Hotels Plc ===
In 2026, she was appointed as the Chairperson of Transcorp Hotels Plc, Nigeria’s leading hospitality company, owner of the iconic Transcorp Hilton Hotel Abuja, where she drives its commitment to redefining hospitality across the continent. Transcorp Hotels is a subsidiary of Transnational Corporation Plc, Nigeria’s largest quoted conglomerate, with strategic investments in the power, hospitality, and energy sectors

== Advocacy ==
Elumelu has participated in campaigns for universal health coverage, particularly focusing on maternal and child health and immunization programs. She was appointed GAVI Champion for Immunisation in Africa, working to raise awareness about vaccine access and preventable diseases.

She sits on several regional and global boards, including the Ellen Johnson Sirleaf Presidential Centre, Yale Institute of Global Health, and the African Union’s African High-Level Ministerial Committee on Global Health Architecture (AHLMC).

== Awards ==
In 2023, she was conferred Officer of the Order of the Federal Republic (OFR) by President Muhammadu Buhari.

In 2026, She was recognised in TIME magazine’s 100 Most Influential People in Philanthropy of 2026

== Personal life ==
She is married to Tony Elumelu.
