= United Bank for Africa Ghana Ltd. =

Banking subsidiary of UBA in West Africa

United Bank for Africa
- Type: Public limited company
- Traded as: NGX: UBA
- Industry: Financial services Banking; Investment services
- Founded: 1949; 77 years ago
- Headquarters: Group Headquarters - UBA House, 57 Marina, Lagos, Lagos State, Nigeria
- Areas served: Africa, Europe, United States and Asia
- Key people: Tony Elumelu; Group Chairman; Oliver Alawuba; Group Managing Director & Group CEO
- Products: Internet banking Mobile banking Wholesale Banking; Corporate banking Investment Banking; Consumer Banking; Collections; Treasury; Trade finance Savings Accounts; Current Accounts; Domiciliary Accounts; Non-Resident African Banking; Money Transfer; Debit Cards
- Revenue: ▲Beforetax:₦603 billion (US$$358.3 million) (Q3 2024)
- Total assets: ₦31.801 trillion (US$18.9 billion) (Q3 2024)
- Number of employees: 25,000+ (2024)
- Website: ubaghana.com

United Bank for Africa Ghana, a subsidiary of UBA Group, was established in 2004 as part of UBA's expansion into West Africa. The bank is licensed and regulated by the Central Bank of Ghana. UBA Ghana also known as UBA Ghana Ltd. is a subsidiary of the United Bank for Africa, headquartered in Lagos, Nigeria, with branches in twenty other African countries as well as the United Kingdom, France and the United States. The bank operates as a full-service financial institution offering a wide range of products and services, including personal and business banking, loans, investments and digital banking.

== Location ==
The headquarters of UBA Ghana is located at Heritage Tower Ambassadorial Enclave Off Liberia Road Ridge Accra P.M.B 29, Ministries Accra, Ghana.

== Overview ==
Over the past 20 years, UBA Ghana has offered various services such as retail banking, corporate banking, SME support, and digital solutions like internet and mobile banking. The bank's goals in digital transformation include introducing mobile banking apps and platforms to simplify customer transactions and improve financial accessibility.

The bank reported a 203% increase in profit for the first half of 2023, driven by its focus on expanding market share and enhancing customer services.

=== UBA Ghana 20th Anniversary ===
UBA Ghana is the first Nigerian bank to establish operations in Ghana. The bank recently marked its 20th anniversary in 2024. Since its inception in 2004, the bank has contributed to the modernization of banking in Ghana, promoting financial inclusion and supporting economic growth. Over the years, UBA Ghana has introduced various innovations, including mobile banking services, the AI-powered chatbot "Leo," and Braille account-opening forms designed to improve accessibility for visually impaired customers. The bank has also provided tailored financial services to support small and medium-sized enterprises (SMEs) and foster entrepreneurship, contributing to economic development in the country.

=== Corporate Social Responsibility ===
In addition to its banking services, UBA Ghana has been involved in corporate social responsibility (CSR) initiatives, such as the National Essay Competition, the Read Africa program, and environmental sustainability efforts, including tree-planting campaigns. These initiatives have aimed to support education, youth empowerment, and environmental conservation.

== Awards and Recognitions ==
- The winner of the Most Sustainable Bank of the Year 2024 category by the Global Business Magazine Awards.

== Branches in Ghana ==
Greater Accra Region Branches

- Ashiaman
- Abeka Lapaz
- Abossey Okai Business Office
- Accra Central Business Office
- Airport Business Office
- Achimota
- Ring Road
