= Africapitalism =

Economic philosophy

Africapitalism is the economic philosophy that the African private sector has the power to transform the continent through long-term investments, creating both economic prosperity and social wealth. A think tank tasked with studying the philosophy, the Africapitalism Institute, was formally launched during the 2014 World Economic Forum on Africa in Abuja, Nigeria in May of that year.

Nigerian philanthropist, private investor and former banker Tony O. Elumelu first iterated the term in 2011, which has been linked to concepts including "inclusive capitalism", "impact investing," "conscious capitalism" and "philanthro-capitalism.". However, the neo-capitalism philosophy most closely associated with Africapitalism is the theory of "creating shared value" — a concept defined in a Harvard Business Review article titled "Creating Shared Value: Redefining Capitalism and the Role of the Corporation in Society", written by economist, Professor Michael Porter and Mark R. Kramer of the John F. Kennedy School of Government at Harvard University. The central premise behind creating shared value is that the competitiveness of a company and the health of the communities around it are mutually dependent.

== History ==
Elumelu first introduced the term "Africapitalism" in 2011 and had outlined the concept's main tenets and philosophies in numerous publications, including The Economist, the Financial Times and Fortune. The philosophy is one of the four stated pillars of the mission of The Tony Elumelu Foundation, the charity foundation he founded in the same year.

In 2014, the philosophy was buttressed by the establishment of the Africapitalism Institute, a pan-African think tank dedicated to the promotion of the philosophy through "rigorous academic-level applied research" on the transformative role of the private sector in Africa’s development.

The Institute was formally launched during the 2014 World Economic Forum on Africa in Abuja, Nigeria in May of that year. In February 2015 – the Africapitalism Index, which evaluates the manner in which African economies are growing – was outlined by the Director of the Institute during an interview on CNBC Africa. The index is one of the signature publications of the institute.

African business magazine Ventures Africa referred to U.S. President Barack Obama as "Obama the Africapitalist," following his pledge of $7 billion to the "Power Africa" Initiative, which aims to advance access to power in Ethiopia, Ghana, Kenya, Liberia, Nigeria and Tanzania. The philosophy of Africapitalism was also a theme of the historic, first-ever US-Africa Summit hosted by President Obama in Washington, D.C. in August 2014; and a panel at the Africa CEO Forum in Geneva in March 2014.

== Characteristics and philosophy ==
According to Elumelu, Africapitalism is "the middle ground between business and philanthropy." Characteristics of Africapitalism include:

- Transforming private investment into social wealth, with homegrown African businesses meeting social and economic needs by creating goods and services with an innate understanding of the local environment. These businesses can bring private capital to vital infrastructure like road transport and power generation, and can create jobs for Africans and an African middle class.
- Promoting entrepreneurship. Elumelu has claimed that one of the primary roles of African governments should be in "creating the right environment for a new crop of entrepreneurs to emerge," and has described entrepreneurship as "the cornerstone to African development." In December 2014, The Tony Elumelu Foundation launched an entrepreneurship program that will devote $100 million over 10 years to identify and help grow 10,000 African startups and young businesses.
- Elements of social enterprise. Aspects of Africapitalism share similarities to social enterprise schemes, which champion the dual pursuits of profit and social good through long-term investments Some examples of social enterprise initiatives include country-specific programs like the India Development Marketplace, as well as international ones like the UN Social Enterprise Action Hub, and those led by the Skoll Foundation in the United States and the Khemka Foundation in India.
- Local value creation. The economic and geopolitical interests of global powers and not that of Africans, has for centuries shaped Africa’s destiny. In the years following the end of the Cold War, many African countries have seen steady economic growth, but fueled primarily by non-African exploitation of the continent’s natural resources with raw material exported as unimproved goods. This resource driven growth does not have the concomitant impact on job creation and other social issues that is required to take the continent out of poverty. Local value creation is an explicit effort on the part of businesses and African policymakers to facilitate more value addition within African economies to ensure more of the benefits of the continent’s natural resources remain in Africa.

== Scholarly research ==
In the spring of 2014, Prof. Kenneth Amaeshi, a Nigerian-born academic based at the University of Edinburgh in Scotland, initiated an international, multi-disciplinary project to explore the fundamental underpinnings of the Africapitalism philosophy. Later that year, Amaeshi convened the first-ever academic symposium on Africapitalism during which he and a number of other African scholars presented their preliminary findings from ongoing research.

The scholars participating in the University of Edinburgh Africapitalism Project are Amon Chizema, Chair in International Business and Strategy and Head of Discipline, International Business, Strategy and Innovation, Loughborough University, UK; Judy Muthuri, Assistant Professor in Corporate Social Responsibility, Nottingham University Business School; Nceku Nyathi, Senior Lecturer, Graduate School of Business, University of Cape Town, South Africa; Emmanuel Adegbite, Senior Lecturer in Accounting, Deputy Director for Ethics, Organisations and Society Research, Durham University, United Kingdom; George N. Njenga, current and Founding Dean, Strathmore Business School, and Deputy Vice Chancellor of Research and Quality Assurance, and Academic Director for the SBS Advanced Management Program; Moses Ochieng, Research Associate, Strathmore University, Kenya; Salimata Ndeye Fall, Professor, International University of Grand Bassam, Abidjan; and David A. Rice, Director of the Africapitalism Institute at the Tony Elumelu Foundation and formerly a professor at New York University and Executive Director of the NYU Development Research Institute founded by global development economist Professor William Easterly.

Local value creation was further explored during a public forum held in Abuja, Nigeria on January 7, 2015 when former CNN anchor Zain Verjee moderated a panel of experts that included economist and proprietor of the economic classification terms "BRIC" and "MINT", Jim O'Neill, former Chief Economist of Goldman Sachs; Professor Tandeka Nkiwane, Special Advisor to the CEO of the New Economic Partnership for Africa's Development (NEPAD); Matthew Bishop, globalization editor of The Economist; Amir Ben Yahmed, Managing Director of the Jeune Afrique Group; and Rasheed Adejare Olaoluwa, Managing Director/Chief Executive Officer, the Bank of Industry.

In 2015, the Tony Elumelu Foundation partnered with a foundation in Africa, South Africa's Brenthurst Foundation on a book project. Titled "Africans investing in Africa", with an introduction by economist, Paul Collier. It launched on the side-lines of the World Economic Forum in June, 2015 in Johannesburg, South Africa. The book espouses Africapitalism, providing a unique perspective of how Africans are leading the way through intra-African trade and investment, documenting how, where and why Africans invest across the continent.

Amaeshi and a colleague, Uwafiokun Idemudia published a paper in the African Journal of Management on "Africapitalism: A Management Idea for Business in Africa?" exploring the challenges and implications of Africapitalism for management in Africa.

Elumelu has spoken extensively on the role of Africapitalism in nation-building at several conferences and forums across the world. In May 2015, he delivered a keynote address at Oxford University on its potential to act as a catalyst for development in Africa, urging more deliberate efforts in driving a new kind of private- sector investment model. The week before, Elumelu had also given a speech at Georgetown University positing that entrepreneurship-led development which Africapitalism seeks to boost, is key to the growth of the continent.

In July 2015, Durham University Business School and the Africapitalism Institute partnered to co-host a day-long academic symposium on the philosophy in Lagos. A number of distinguished faculty members from Durham University made presentations to a diverse audience that included scholars, students, business people and investors. Participating faculty members included Professor Geoff Moore, Chair of Business Ethics and Deputy Dean; Professor Mehmet Asutay, a lecturer in Islamic Finance; senior lecturer Emmanuel Adegbite, who spoke about Africapitalism and corporate governance; and Mark Learmonth, Professor of Organizational Studies. The day’s agenda was driven by Dr. Adegbite, who is a member of the Africapitalism Research Project team led by Professor Kenneth Amaeshi.

The Institute also released a comprehensive report on the entrepreneurial ecosystem in Africa, analysing challenges facing African entrepreneurs and their proposed solutions. Titled Unleashing Africa's Entrepreneurs: Improving the Enabling Environment for Start-ups, it was first released to the public at a world-press conference on the sidelines of the 6th Global Entrepreneurship Summit in Nairobi, Kenya on 25 July 2015. The data used was based on original research leveraging TEF's pan-African network of over 20,000 early stage African businesses.

Elumelu has also been consistently articulating his thoughts in advocating for Africapitalism as a vehicle to accelerate the development of Africa, through op-eds on various platforms including TIME, Libération and CNN.

== Responses to Africapitalism ==
Africapitalism — along with similar efforts focused on a reformed capitalistic economic system that takes the social impact of business in to account — has received praise from academics, NGOs, government officials, development and anti-poverty experts and private sector investors.

Response from the international development community has also been largely positive. U.S. Vice President Joe Biden, in a keynote speech at the 2014 Global Entrepreneurship Summit, celebrated the importance of "creating an entire climate in which innovation and ideas flourish." African entrepreneurs like Cameroonian Christian Ngan and Kenyan Mubarak Muyika agree that galvanizing the African private sector is crucial to social gains in the continent, as did attendees at the 2014 Africa CEO Forum.

Other African leaders in government, academics and business have discussed the importance of harnessing the power of the private sector to drive sustainable development in preparation for the United Nations’ launch of the Sustainable Development Goals in 2015 – the initiative due to succeed the UN’s Millennium Development Goals (MDGs). This was the subject of a public panel discussion held at New York University Stern School of Business - sponsored by the Africapitalism Institute - in September 2014 during the United Nations General Assembly in New York. The School School’s Dean, Peter Henry, provided the opening remarks, and United Nations Under-Secretary-General and the Special Representative of the Secretary-General for Sustainable Energy for All, Dr. Kandeh Yumkella gave the keynote address. Dr. Yumkellah’s remarks were followed by a panel of experts discussing the important role Africa's private sector must play if the Sustainable Development Goals are to be successful.

Some commentators claim the philosophy is overly dismissive of the role of traditional aid in anti-poverty measures. Joel Bakan, law professor at the University of British Columbia, argues that the Africapitalist philosophy "places profound limits on the ability to do good," and that this sort of rhetoric can be used by big businesses to push towards deregulation. Africapitalism and other emerging capitalism reform philosophies have also been criticized as efforts to marginalize the role of government and transfer more influence to the private sector whose fundamental purpose is profit maximization as opposed to fostering broader prosperity.

In an op-ed titled Entrepreneurs and Philosopher Kings for Africapitalism, Jibrin Ibrahim, Director of the Centre for Democracy & Development, opines that the key to the development of capitalism and Africapitalism by extension, is in the hands of the State; effectively echoing Elumelu's position that governments ought to create an enabling environment for entrepreneurs. He stressed that the state needs to play its own role, including ensuring that producers and other entrepreneurs have access to credit, rather than just traders and speculators.

== Practice ==
The program is currently accepting applications for the 2022 edition. In 2014, Elumelu set up the Tony Elumelu Entrepreneurship Programme, a decade-long, $100 million entrepreneurial initiative in which 1,000 young African entrepreneurs get $5,000 in seed capital with the option of a further $5,000 low interest loan or equity each year to nurture their ideas and ultimately develop the continent.

== Bibliography ==
- Amaeshi, Kenneth (2 October 2013) "Africapitalism: Unleashing the power of emotions for Africa's development?", African Arguments
- Court, Alex (5 December 2014) "Nigerian billionaire pledges $100 million to help grow 10,000 African startups", CNN
- Doane, Deborah (25 February 2014) "Social enterprise: Can it succeed where traditional development has failed?", The Guardian
- Edwards, Ruby (12 July 2013) Can Africapitalism save the continent?", The Guardian
- Hart, Stuart and Prahalad, CK (10 January 2002) "The fortune at the bottom of the pyramid", Strategy+Business
- Jacks, Mzwandile (8 July 2013) "Obama the Africapitalist: Creating a private sector development", Ventures-Africa.com
- Preston, Caroline (5 June 2012) "Nigerian banker urges business approach to poverty in Africa", The Chronicle of Philanthropy
- Stern, Gabriella (8 May 2014) "'Africapitalist' says it's time for private sector to step up", The Wall Street Journal Frontiers
- Young, Holly (13 June 2014) "Social enterprise to Africapitalism: Do the alternatives to capitalism work?", The Guardian
