= Order of the Niger =

Nigerian order of merit

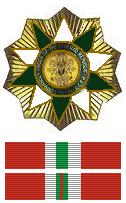
- Star and ribbon of the 2 divisions

Awarded by Nigeria
- Type: Order
- Awarded for: Services to the nation
- Status: Currently constituted
- Sovereign: President of Nigeria
- Grades: Grand Commander (GCON); Commander (CON); Officer (OON); Member (MON)

Precedence
- Next (higher): Order of the Federal Republic
- (civil division) (military division); Ribbon bar of the order

The order takes its name from the Niger River

The Order of the Niger (OON) is the second highest national award in Nigeria. It was instituted in 1963 and is junior to the Order of the Federal Republic (OFR), the highest order of merit in the country.

== Award ==
The two highest honours, the Grand Commander of the Order of the Federal Republic (GCFR), and Grand Commander of the Order of the Niger (GCON), are awarded to the president and vice-president, respectively. The presiding judge in the Supreme Court and the chairman of the Senate are, respectively, a qualitative and ex officio Grand Commander of the Order of the Niger.

== Grades ==
Nigeria followed the British example in the form and structure of the order. Similarly, there are post-nominal letters for members of the Order of the Niger.

- Grand Commander of the Order of the Niger (GCON)
- Commander of the Order of the Niger (CON)
- Officer of the Order of the Niger (OON)
- Member of the Order of the Niger (MON)

The order has a Civil Division and a Military Division. The ribbon of the latter division has a small red line in the middle.

== Notable recipients ==
Notable recipients of the award include:

No.	Name	Status	Sector	Class of medal
1	Alex Ifeanyichukwu Ekwueme	Former Vice President of Nigeria	Public	GCON
2	Aliko Dangote	Chairman of Dangote Group	Private	GCON
3	Aloma Mariam Mukhtar	Former Justice of the Supreme Court	Public	GCON
4	Atiku Abubakar	Former Vice President of Nigeria	Public	GCON
5	Babafemi Ogundipe	Former Chief of Staff, Supreme Headquarters	Public	GCON
6	Bello Maitama Yusuf	Former Internal Affairs Minister	Public	GCON
7	Dahiru Musdapher	Former Justice of the Supreme Court	Public	GCON
8	Emeka Anyaoku	Former Secretary-General of the Commonwealth	Public	GCON
9	Godswill Akpabio	President of the 10th Nigerian Senate	Public	GCON
10	Goodluck Ebele Jonathan	Former Vice President and President of Nigeria	Public	GCON
11	Kashim Shettima	Current Vice President of Nigeria	Public	GCON
12	Kudirat Kekere-Ekun	Chief Justice of Nigeria	Public	GCON
13	Namadi Sambo	Former Vice President of Nigeria	Public	GCON
14	Narendra Modi	Prime Minister of India	Public	GCON
15	Wole Soyinka	Recipient of the 1986 Nobel Prize in Literature	Academia	GCON
16	Yemi Osinbajo, SAN	Former Vice President of Nigeria	Public	GCON
17	Abba Kyari	Former Governor North Central State	Public	CON
18	Adams Oshiomhole	Former Governor, Edo State and Senator, Edo North Central	Public	CON
19	Afe Babalola, SAN	Founder of Afe Babalola University, Senior Advocate of Nigeria	Private	CON
20	Ahmad Muhammad Sani II	Emir of Gumel	Public	CON
21	Akin Mabogunje	Geographer Consultant and First African President of the International Geographical Union	Private and Public	CON
22	Atedo Peterside	Founder, Stanbic IBTC Bank Plc, Anap Business Jets Limited, and The Atedo N. A. Peterside Foundation	Private	CON
23	Bala Muhammed	Governor of Bauchi State	Public	CON
24	Bukar Abba Ibrahim	Former Governor of Yobe State	Public	CON
25	Chukwuemeka Ezeife	Former Governor Anambra State	Public	CON
26	Da. John Putmang Hirse	Traditional Ruler, Miskaham Mwaghavul	Public	CON
27	Emeka Okwuosa	Chairman/GCEO, OilServ Limited	Private	CON
28	Ezenwo Nyesom Wike	Former Governor of Rivers State and Minister of Federal Capital Territory	Public	CON
29	Francesca Yetunde Emanuel	Former Permanent Secretary, Public Service Department of the Cabinet Office	Public	CON
30	Ibrahim Shehu Shema	Former Governor of Katsina State	Public	CON
31	Isiaka Adeleke	Former Governor, Osun State, and former Senator, Osun West	Public	CON
32	John Odigie Oyegun	Former Governor, Edo State	Public	CON
33	Lam Adesina	Former Governor of Oyo State	Public	CON
34	Liyel Imoke	Former Governor, Cross River State	Public	CON
35	Arisekola Alao	Philanthropist and Aare Musulumi of Yorubaland	Private	CON
36	Oba Otudeko	Founder and chairman of the Honeywell Group and Oba Otudeko Foundation	Private	CON
37	Olusegun Agagu	Former Governor of Ondo State, and renowned Geologist	Public	CON
38	Patrick Ibrahim Yakowa	Former Governor of Kaduna State	Public	CON
39	Peter Gregory Obi	Former Governor, Anambra State and 2023 Labour Party Presidential Candidate	Public	CON
40	Isa Ali Pantami	Former Minister of Communications and Digital Economy	Public	CON
41	Rotimi Amaechi	Former Governor of Rivers State and Former Minister of Transportation	Public	CON
42	Rufus Ada George	Former Governor, Rivers State	Public	CON
43	Stephen Keshi	Football coach, 2013 Africa Cup of Nations final winner	Sport	CON
44	Sule Lamido	Former Governor, Jigawa State	Public	CON
45	Sunday Dare	Former Minister of Youth and Sports	Public	CON
46	Tony Elumelu	Philanthropist	Private	CON
47	Victor Ndoma-Egba, SAN	Former Senate Leader, Senior Advocate of Nigeria	Public	CON
48	Abike Kafayat Oluwatoyin Dabiri-Erewa	Chairman/CEO of Nigerians in Diaspora Commission	Public	OON
49	Bashir Ahmad	Former Personal Assistant to the President on Digital and New Media	Public	OON
50	Charles Okpaleke	Nigerian businessman and film producer	Private	OON
51	Erhabor Emokpae	Former National Artist of Nigeria	Public	OON
52	Chief H.T.O. Coker	Private Attorney in Admiralty, Energy and Aviation Law	Private	OON
53	David Adedeji Adeleke	Singer, songwriter, record producer	Entertainment	OON
54	Dr. F.B.A. Coker	Consultant Obstetrician and Gynaecologist, businessman and Chairman of Victoria Island Consultancy and Hospital Services	Private	OON
55	Gabriel Ogbechie	Founder GMD, Rainoil Limited	Private	OON
56	Iyin Aboyeji	Former CEO, Flutterwave & Co-founder, Andela	Private	OON
57	Iyorwuese Hagher	Former Minister of State for Health/Power and Steel, and Ambassador to Mexico and High Commissioner to Canada	Public	OON
58	Joe Abbah	Former Director General, Bureau of Public Service Reforms	Public	OON
59	Joseph Yobo	Footballer, 2013 Africa Cup of Nations final winner	Sport	OON
60	Kayode Ajulo, SAN	Lawyer, arbitrator & civil rights activist	Private	OON
61	Kingsley Moghalu	Former Deputy Governor of the Central Bank of Nigeria, Political Economist	Public	OON
62	Major General Bitrus Vandos Themoi Kwaji	Major General of the Nigerian Army (Retd.)	Public	OON
63	Nimi Briggs	Emeritus Professor of Obstetrics and Gynaecology, and Former Vice Chancellor, University of Port-Harcourt, Rivers State	Public	OON
64	Owen Omogiafo	President/GCEO, Transnational Corporation of Nigeria (Transcorp)	Private	OON
65	Sani Umar Rijiyar Lemo, Bashir Aliyu Umar	Salafism Preacher in Nigeria	Private	OON
66	Sheikh Muhammad Salih Bashir	Religious Leader	Private	OON
67	Stella Oduah	Former Minister of Aviation	Public	OON
68	Tobi Amusan	World, Commonwealth and African champion of the 100 meters hurdles	Sport	OON
69	Victor Olaiya	Renowned Musician, and Trumpeter	Private	OON
70	Asisat Oshoala	Athlete	Sport	MON
71	Dosu Joseph	Footballer	Sport	MON
72	Efe Ambrose	Footballer	Sport	MON
73	Francis Uzoho, Ola Aina, Zaidu Sanusi, Alhassan Yusuf, William Troost-Ekong, Semi Ajayi, Ahmed Musa, Frank Onyeka, Victor Osimhen, Joe Aribo, Samuel Chukwueze, Bright Osayi-Samuel, Bruno Onyemaechi, Kelechi Iheanacho, Moses Simon, Olorunleke Ojo, Alex Iwobi, Ademola Lookman, Paul Onuachu, Chidozie Awaziem, Calvin Bassey, Kenneth Omeruo, Stanley Nwabali, Terem Moffi, Raphael Onyedika	Footballers, 2023 Africa Cup of Nations runners-up	Sport	MON
74	Habeeb Okunola	CEO, TILT Group	Private	MON
75	Joseph Oqua Ansa	Former Senator, Cross River South	Public	MON
76	K1 De Ultimate	Fuji Musician	Entertainment	MON
77	Mohammed Badaru Abubakar	Minister of Defence, Former Governor of Jigawa State	Public	MON
78	Orji Uzor Kalu	Senator representing Abia North, Former Governor of Abia State	Public	MON
79	Teniola Apata	Singer, Songwriter and Entertainer	Private	MON
80	Vincent Enyeama, Elderson Echiéjilé, Nwankwo Obiora, Efe Ambrose, Ahmed Musa, Brown Ideye, Azubuike Egwuekwe, Emmanuel Emenike, Mikel John Obi, Victor Moses, Reuben Gabriel, Fegor Ogude, Godfrey Oboabona, Austin Ejide, Ikechukwu Uche, Ogenyi Onazi, Ejike Uzoenyi, Sunday Mba, Nosa Igiebor, Juwon Oshaniwa, Kenneth Omeruo, Chigozie Agbim	Footballers, 2013 Africa Cup of Nations final winners	Sport	MON
81	Sunday Ola Makinde	Clergy & Nationalist, Prelate Emeritus, Methodist Church Nigeria	Public	CON
