= Abimbola Abass Adebakin =

Nigerian business executive

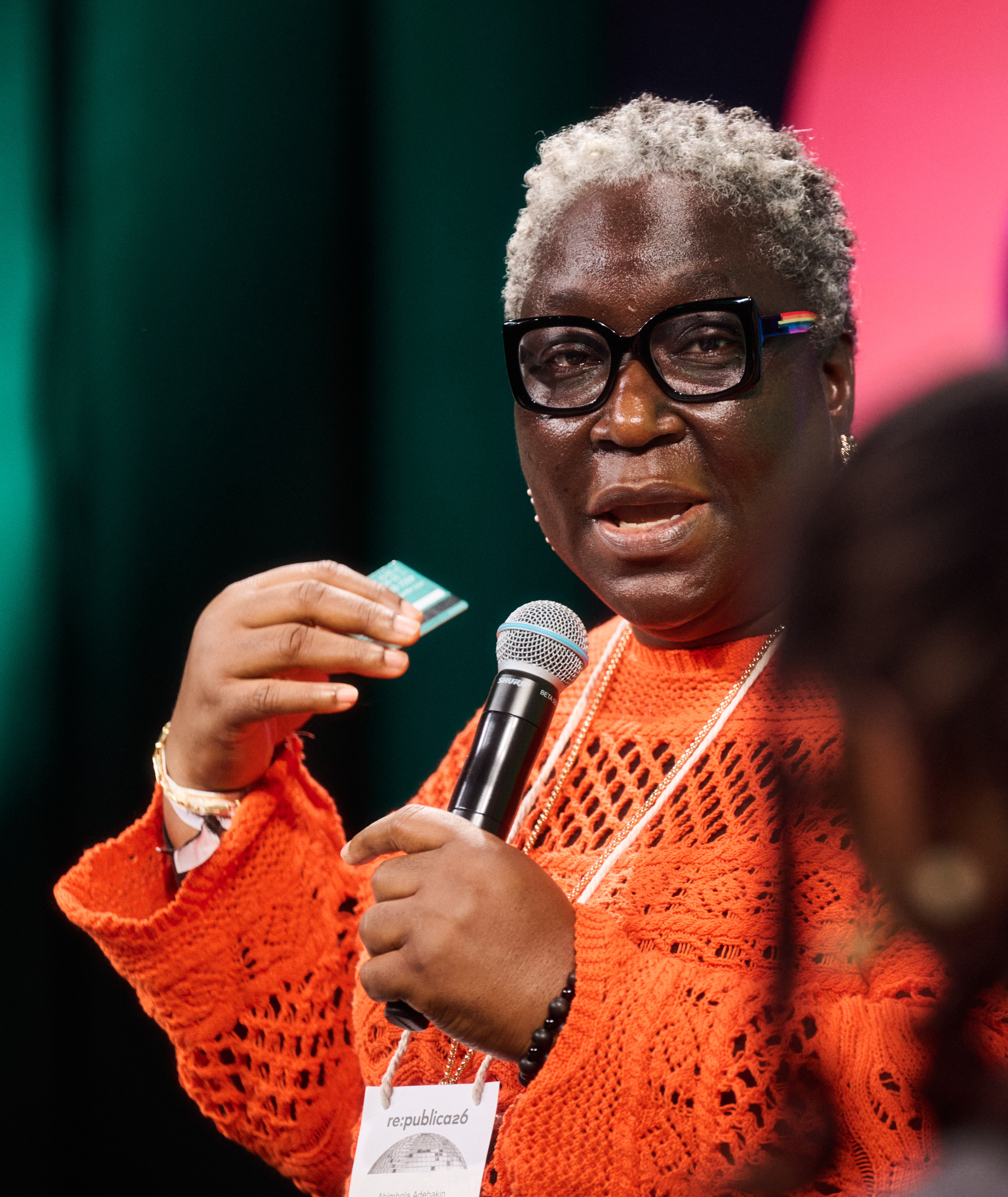
- Occupation: Businesswoman

Abimbola Adebakin (born Abimbola Abass) is a Nigerian business executive and pharmacist. She is the founder and CEO of Advantage Health Africa. Abimbola was previously the Chief Operations Officer for The Tony Elumelu Foundation.

== Career ==
In 2021, she was announced as a winner of the Bayer Foundation Women Empowerment Award and Google's Black Founders Fund. She was YNaija's Person of Year in 2021.

She was also in the top 20 shortlist for the Jack Ma’s Africa’s Business Heroes toplist of 2022.
