= Dupe Olusola =

Nigerian business executive

Modupe Olusola
- Born: September 26, 1974 (age 51); Lagos, Nigeria
- Education: University of Leicester (Economics BA), University of Kent (MSc)
- Occupation: CEO of Transcorp Hotels plc (2020–2024)
- Years active: 1997–present
- Spouse: Lanre Olusola (m. 1999)
- Children: 2
- Website: dupeolusola.com

Modupe Olusola is a Nigerian business executive. She was the Managing Director and Chief Executive Officer of the Nigeria-based Hospitality company, Transcorp Hotels plc, subsidiary of the Nigerian conglomerate, Transnational Corporation of Nigeria. from March 2020 to December 2024.

In March 2020, she was appointed to head Transcorp Hotels by the existing board members, becoming the second woman to lead the organisation. Before joining Transcorp Hotels Plc, Dupe was Group Head of Marketing at United Bank for Africa (UBA) and was involved in leading all marketing efforts of UBA Group’s 23 countries of presence. She had previously served as Managing Director and Chief Executive Officer of the Nigeria-based agricultural company, Teragro Commodities Limited, the agribusiness subsidiary of Transnational Corporation of Nigeria Plc (Transcorp Plc). She was appointed to the position in 2014.

In 2015 as CEO of Teragro, she was named on Ventures Africa’s 10 Most Influential Nigerian CEOs.

== Early life and education ==
Dupe attended Queen's College, Lagos, where she obtained her GCE O-levels in 1991. After O-levels, she enrolled at University of Leicester, United Kingdom where graduating in 1996 and went on to obtain a Master's degree (MSc) in Development Economics from the University of Kent in 1997.

== Career ==
=== Early career ===
After her Masters, Dupe worked in different roles with Bloomberg and Northern Trust in the United Kingdom before moving back to Nigeria.

In Nigeria, she worked in SecTrust (now Afrinvest) and thereafter with Africa’s leading Private Equity Firm SME Manager/African Capital Alliance and joined the investor relations department of the UBA group in 2008 before a move to Transcorp as Director of Resources in January 2010.

=== Teragro ===
In 2014, she was appointed to lead the now-defunct Agribusiness arm of Transcorp - Teragro Commodities Limited as Chief Executive Officer and Managing Director.

As CEO of Teragro Commodities, she was responsible for the acquisition of two farmlands measuring 10,000 hectares in Benue State for citrus farming and spearheaded a partnership with Coca Cola to produce Five Alive Pulpy Orange Juice making Teragro the sole local material source for the juice.

=== United Bank for Africa ===
Dupe returned to United Bank for Africa (UBA) Plc as the Group Head Embassies, Multilaterals, and Development Organizations (EMDOs) and Global Investors Services (GIS) and was in 2018 appointed as Group Head, Marketing for United Bank for Africa. In this role, she was responsible for the development and delivery of the integrated strategy for all UBA Group Bank and non-bank subsidiaries.

=== Transcorp Hotels Plc ===
In March 2020, she was appointed as Managing Director and Chief Executive Officer of Transcorp Hotels Plc., taking over from Owen Omogiafo and leading the strategic operations of its flagship property Transcorp Hilton Abuja and Transcorp Hotels Calabar. In July, 2021 she launched Aura by Transcorp Hotels, an online platform for booking accommodation and experiences.

== Personal life ==
Dupe is married to life coach, Lanre Olusola and they have two children. During her 50th year birthday, she launched an NGO for the aim of educating vulnerable Nigerian children from low-income families.

== Honours ==
- The Leading Ladies Africa/ YNaija’s “100 Most Inspiring Women in Nigeria” List for her passion in Women Affairs and Empowerment, Economic Development of under-developed countries and Financial inclusion.
- In 2015 as CEO of Teragro, she was named on Ventures Africa’s 10 Most Influential Nigerian CEOs.
- In 2021, she was listed as one of the top 4 women in Africa in the Strategic Women in Leadership Award (SAWIL).
- In 2022, she was named as one of the 100 Most Powerful People in Africa Hospitality by the International Hospitality Institute.
- Dupe is also a member of the advisory board of the Africa Hospitality Investment Forum (AHIF) – Africa’s leading hospitality investment conference that connects business leaders from the international and local markets.
- In 2023, Dupe was named CEO of the Year by Nigeria's Leadership Newspaper and the Seven Stars Luxury Hospitality and Lifestyle Awards.
- In 2024, she won the Guardian Wonder Women Award for Innovative Entrepreneurship & Careers.
- She was also honoured with the Hospitality Leadership Award by the Africa Investment Forum (AHIF).
- She was honoured as the "7 Stars Woman of the Year" in October, 2024;thus inducting her into the inducted into the Seven Stars Pantheon of Hospitality.

Business positions
Preceded by Owen Omogiafo	Chief Executive Officer of Transcorp Hotels plc 2020–2024	Incumbent
