= Benfruit Plant =

Fruit-processing plant in Benue State, Nigeria

- Company type: Company
- Industry: Agribusiness
- Headquarters: Lagos, Nigeria
- Key people: Emmanuel Nnorom, Chairman; Dupe Olusola, CEO
- Products: Fruit Juice Concentrates

Benfruit Plant is a fruit-processing plant based in Benue State in Nigeria’s fertile middle-belt region. It is owned and operated by Teragro Commodities Limited, the agribusiness subsidiary of Transnational Corporation of Nigeria Plc (Transcorp), a Lagos-based conglomerate. It was established in 2011 as a result of a partnership between Teragro and the Benue State Government.

The plant is used to process orange and pineapple concentrates, mango purees and orange oil for industrial markets. The plant can process up to 26.5 million tons of fruit per year; the existing technology housed there ensures that the juices extracted meet international quality standards.

== History ==
On May 19, 2011, Teragro signed an agreement with the Benue State government to take over Benfruit, the state-run fruit juice concentrate company.

The plant, which is located in the Makurdi Industrial Estate, is situated on one hectare of land. It has installed capacity to produce orange, mango and pineapple fruit concentrates at up to 26,500 metric tonnes per annum.

During several consultations across the state with farmers’ cooperatives, government representatives, and local politicians, Transcorp Plc was invited to make the investment in support of Benue’s reputation as the ‘food basket of the nation'. Benue State currently produces over one million (1,000,000) metric tonnes of citrus fruits per annum.

The Benfruit transaction was Transcorp’s first investment in the agribusiness segment.

== Operator ==
Teragro Commodities Limited is the operator. Teragro and its products are certified by the National Agency for Food and Drugs Administration (NAFDAC) of Nigeria and the Global Food Safety Initiative (GFSI) with ISO 9001:2008 and FSSC 22000:2005.
