= Owen Omogiafo =

Nigerian Business executive (born 1980)

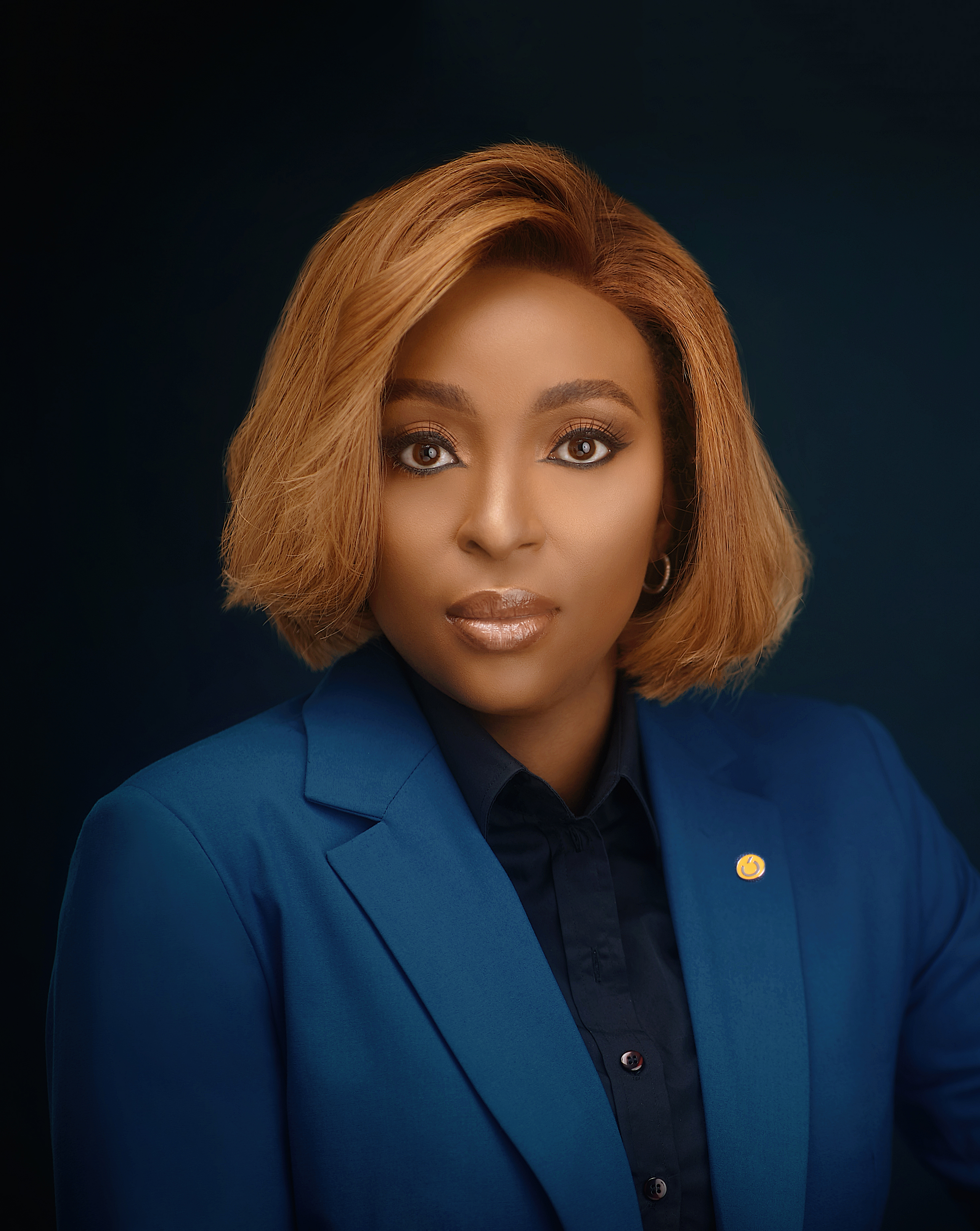
- Owen Omogiafo
- Born: Owen Diana Elaiho; 28 May 1980 (age 46); Benin City, Nigeria
- Education: University of Benin (Sociology and Anthropology BSc); London School of Economics and Political Science (MSc)
- Occupation: President/CEO of Transnational Corporation of Nigeria (2020–present)

Owen Diana Omogiafo (née Elaiho; born 28 May 1980) is a Nigerian business executive and strategist. She is the President and Group Chief Executive Officer of Transnational Corporation Plc (Transcorp Group), a diversified conglomerate with strategic investments in the Power, Hospitality and Oil and Gas sectors.

On May 28, 2023, she was conferred one of Nigeria's national honours - Officer of the Order of Niger (OON) by Nigeria's former president - Muhammadu Buhari.

== Early life and education ==
Owen Omogiafo was born on 28 May 1980, Benin City, Edo State, Nigeria. She attended the University of Benin, where she earned a Bachelor's degree (double honours) in Sociology and Anthropology. She holds a Master of Science degree in Human Resource Management from the London School of Economics and Political Science and is an alumna of the Lagos Business School and IESE Business School, Spain. She is currently the president of Lagos Business School Alumni Association.

She is a member of the Chartered Institute of Personnel and Development, UK and a Certified Change Manager with the Prosci Institute, USA. She is a member of the Institute of Directors (IoD) Nigeria.

== Career ==
Owen has worked in diverse roles including as Director of Human Resources at Heirs Holdings, Chief of Staff, Human Resource Advisor to the GMD/CEO at United Bank for Africa (UBA) and as an Organisation and Human Performance Consultant at Accenture, specializing in Change Management. .

=== Early career ===
Owen's early career commenced in Stockbroking and later, she moved to Banking where she held various roles spanning Operations, Service Quality Management and Relationship Management. Before joining UBA, she worked with Accenture where she covered various projects and clients spanning the Private and Public sectors and diverse industries.

=== Heirs Holdings Limited and Tony Elumelu Foundation ===
As a staff of Heirs Holdings, Owen served in various capacities including as the Director of Resources, responsible for establishing structures for optimal man and machine engagement and deployment within Heirs Holdings Group. She equally served as the Chief Operating Officer at the Tony Elumelu Foundation (TEF), where, working with the CEO and the Board, she oversaw the $100m Programme aimed at identifying, mentoring, and funding 10,000 entrepreneurs over 10 years.

=== Transnational Corporation Plc (Transcorp) ===
She joined Transcorp (formerly Transnational Corporation of Nigeria) as the Executive Director, Corporate Services in July 2018, and later appointed as the Managing Director and Chief Executive Officer of Transcorp Hotels Plc, leading the brand's operation of its flagship Transcorp Hilton Abuja and Transcorp Hotels Calabar.

In March 2020, she became the President/Chief Executive Officer of Transcorp after her appointment to the role, she became the youngest CEO on the Nigerian Stock Exchange and also the youngest and first female to occupy the position at Transcorp Group.

Owen is a member of the Board of Trustees of the Association of Power Generation Companies (APGC) in Nigeria, an association for power generation companies representing the interests of developers and operators of independent energy facilities. She holds Non-Executive Director positions in various companies including Transcorp Power Limited, Transcorp Hotels Plc and Avon Healthcare Limited, where she sits on the Board's Finance, Investment & Risk Committee, and Audit & Governance Committee.

== Personal life ==
Owen is married to Osato Omogiafo and they have three children.

== Honors ==
She has received several awards and recognition including:

- Outstanding African CEO of the Year (13th Edition of the African Achievers Awards)
- Officer of the Order of Niger (OON)
- Business Day (Nigeria) Women's Hub – 50 Most Inspiring Nigerian Women
- Leading Ladies Africa - 50 Leading Ladies in Corporate Nigeria
- YNaija - Power List for Corporate Nigeria 2018
- All Africa Businesswoman of the Year at the All Africa Business Leaders Awards.

Business positions
Preceded by Valentine Ozigbo	President/Chief Executive Officer of Transnational Corporation of Nigeria; 2020–present	Incumbent
