= Heirs Holdings =

African Holding Company

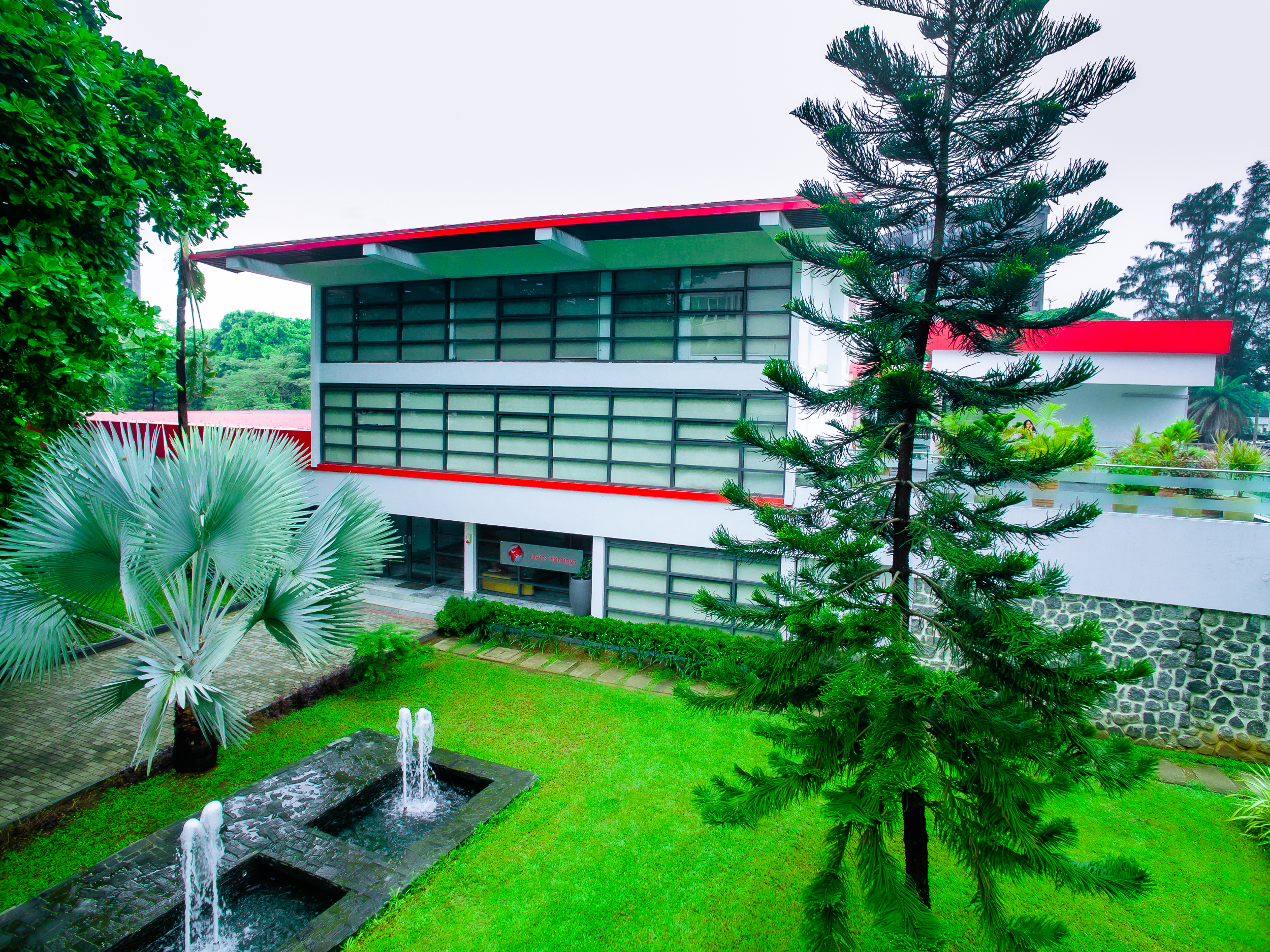
- Type: Private
- Industry: Financial services, Power, Energy, Real Estate, Hospitality, Healthcare, Insurance and Technology
- Founded: August 1, 2010; 16 years ago
- Founders: Tony Elumelu
- Headquarters: Ikoyi, Lagos, Nigeria
- Area served: Worldwide
- Key people: Tony Elumelu; Chairman; Emmanuel Nnorom; Group CEO
- Website: heirsholdings.com

Heirs Holdings is a family-owned investment holding company headquartered in Lagos, Nigeria with investment interests in various sectors in Africa.

== History ==
Heirs Holdings was founded in 2010 by Tony Elumelu, CFR after his retirement in 2010 from the United Bank for Africa (UBA) Plc, where he had served as Group Managing Director.

In 2011, Heirs Holdings made its first investment by acquiring a controlling stake in Transcorp, Nigeria's largest listed conglomerate.

In 2012, Heirs Holdings made further investments in the real estate and financial sectors. Afriland Properties Plc, a property management, investment, and development company; United Capital Plc, a financial and investment services group; and Africa Prudential Registrar Plc, a share registration service provider.

In 2013, Heirs Holdings committed US$2.5bn, as the single largest private sector investor in President Barack Obama Power Africa Initiative with the ambition to add 30,000MW of new electricity generation capacity, to increase electricity access by at least 60 million new connections in Sub-Saharan Africa.

In 2020, Heirs Holdings successfully acquired OML17 from Shell, Total and Eni in what's termed the largest oil and gas transaction in Africa for the year 2020.

== Investments overview ==
Heirs Holdings' Investments are organised into six verticals: Financial Services, Power, Energy, Real Estate and Hospitality, Healthcare and Technology.

=== Financial Services ===
Heirs Holdings’ interests and investment in financial services cuts across banking, insurance, investment banking, asset management and capital market registration.

- United Bank for Africa Plc (UBA) – A Nigerian pan-African financial services group headquartered in Lagos with subsidiaries in 20 African countries and offices in London, Paris, Dubai, and New York.
- United Capital Plc – Financial and investment services group
- Africa Prudential Registrars – A Nigerian Capital Market Registration Company
- Heirs Insurance Group – A digital-first insurance group comprising Heirs General Insurance, Heirs Life Assurance and Heirs Insurance Brokers.

=== Real estate and hospitality ===
Investment in property development and facility management services.

- Afriland Properties Plc – Property management development company working across the real estate value chain.
- Transcorp Hotels Plc – Nigerian based hospitality firm and owner of the iconic Transcorp Hilton Hotel, Abuja.

=== Power, oil and gas ===
Investment in power, oil and gas sectors are as follows.

- Transnational Corporation of Nigeria – diversified conglomerate with business interests are in Power and Energy.
- Transcorp Power and Transafam Power – power generating companies in Nigeria in electricity generated and wheeled unto the national grid. Following power sector reforms in Nigeria and privatization of national power assets, Transcorp Plc won the bid for a distressed power generating company, Ughelli Power Plc – operator of Ughelli Power Plant in 2012 and the Afam Power Plant in 2020.

These investments are part of Heirs Holdings’ commitment to USAID's Power Africa initiative.

- Tenoil Petroleum & Energy Services (TENOIL) – An indigenous operator of OPL 2008, a 40 km^{2} block which holds gas reserves and operates under a Production Sharing Contract with the Nigerian National Petroleum Corporation.
- Heirs Energies (Formerly Heirs Oil & Gas) – An integrated energy company led by Osa Igiehon. In January 2021, Heirs Holdings announced its acquisition of 45% operating stake in a permit known as Oil Mining Lease 17 from Shell, Total and ENI in a deal worth more than $1 billion.
- Heirs Holdings (via Heirs Energies Limited) acquired a 20.07% equity stake in Seplat Energy Plc from French firm Maurel & Prom in a transaction valued at approximately $500 million, making them the single largest shareholder in the Nigerian energy company. [1, 2]

=== Healthcare ===
Investment in health facilities, equipment, and services.

- Avon HMO – A Health maintenance organisation (HMO) licensed by Nigeria's National Health Insurance Scheme (NHIS) to operate as a national HMO in October 2012
- Avon Medical Practice – A private healthcare provider based in Lagos, Nigeria. Avon Medical Practice operates hospitals, on-site clinics and a dialysis centre.

=== Technology ===
- Heirs Technology - A technology and innovation company licensed by the Nigeria Revenue Service (NRS) to operate as a Systems Integrator in January 2026.
- Redtech - A pan-African technology services company that delivers end to end digital transformation solutions spanning Cybersecurity, Digital Banking, Infrastructure, AI and Data, Managed Services, e-invoicing to enterprises, financial institutions and governments across Africa.

== Leadership ==
=== Board of directors ===
As of July 2, 2026:

- Tony Elumelu (chairman)
- Emmanuel Nnorom (CEO)
- Dr. Awele Elumelu (Non-Executive Director)
- Alex Trotter (Independent Non-Executive Director)
- Victor Osadolor (Non-Executive Director)
- Chiugo Ndubisi (Executive director)
- Sola Yomi-Ajayi (Non-Executive Director)
- Obinna Ufudo (Non-Executive Director)
