= United Bank for Africa Zambia Limited =

Zambian commercial bank

Coordinates: 15°23′28″S 28°19′07″E

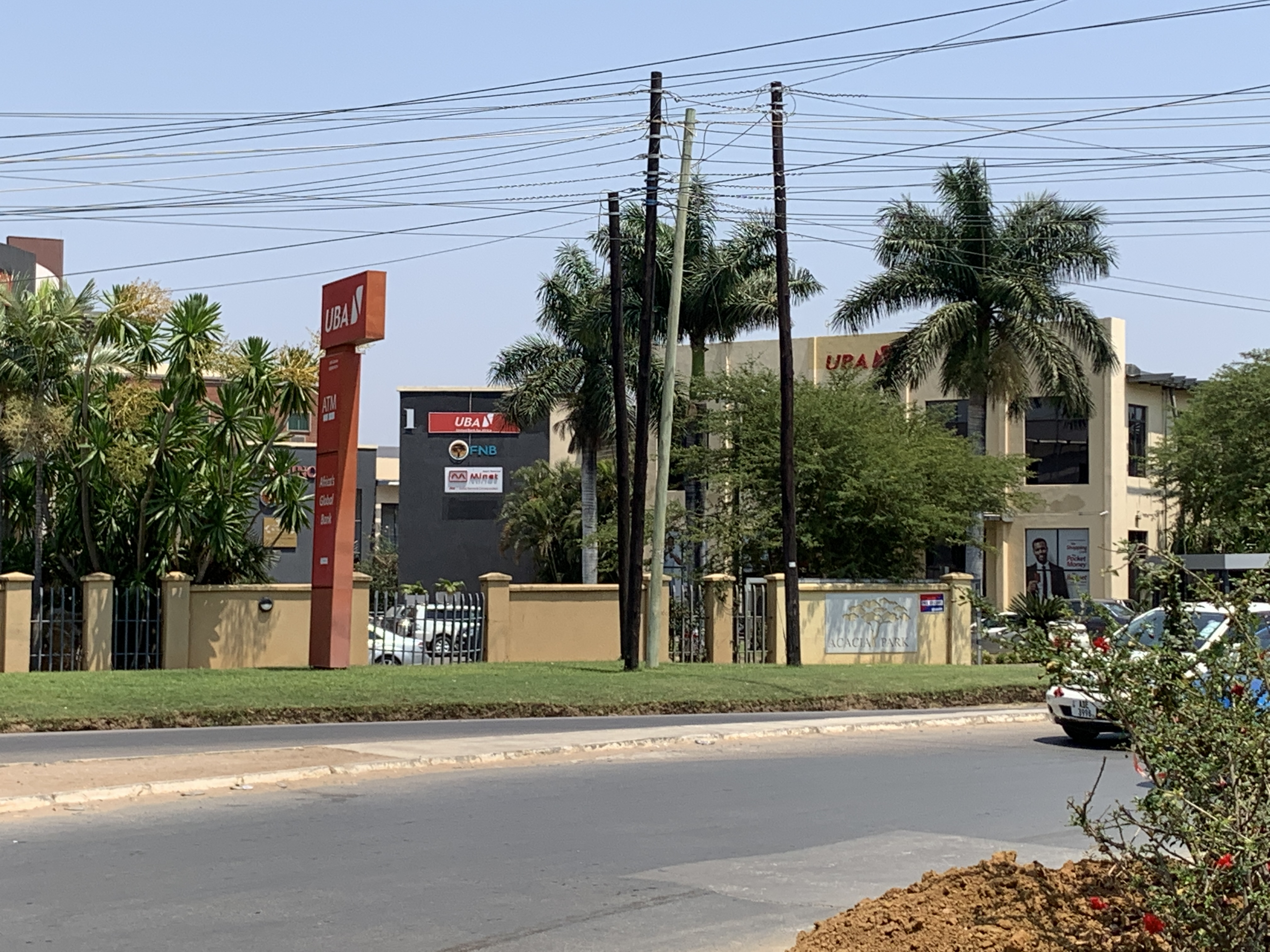
- Company type: Subsidiary of United Bank for Africa
- Industry: Banking
- Founded: January 1, 2010; 16 years ago
- Headquarters: Lusaka, Zambia
- Key people: Dr. Tukiya Kankasa-Mabula; Chairman; Chinedu Obeta; Managing Director
- Products: Loans, credit cards, savings, investments, mortgages
- Website: www.ubazambia.com

United Bank for Africa Zambia Limited, also UBA Zambia, is a commercial bank in Zambia. It is licensed by the Bank of Zambia, the central bank and national banking regulator.

== Location ==
The headquarters and main branch of UBA Zambia Limited are located at Stand 22768, Acacia Park, at the Corner of Great East Road and Thabo Mbeki Road, in the central business district of Lusaka, the capital and largest city of Zambia. The geographical coordinates of the bank's headquarters are:15°23'28.0"S, 28°19'07.0"E (Latitude:-15.391111; Longitude:28.318611).

== Overview ==
The bank serves the banking needs of large corporations, small and medium sized enterprises, individuals and government departments. The bank is a 100 percent subsidiary of United Bank for Africa, a Nigerian-headquartered financial services conglomerate, with banking subsidiaries in 20 sub-Saharan countries, whose total assets were valued at US$14.6 billion, as of 31 December 2019.

== History ==
UBA Zambia was established in 2010, following successful start-ups by the parent company in Kenya, Uganda and Tanzania. UBA Zambia is the first UBA subsidiary to be established in Southern Africa. UBA Zambia promotes cashless banking and the use of internet banking products.

== Branch network ==
As of June 2020, the bank maintained a network of branches at the following locations: 1. Acacia Park Branch: Acacia Park, Lusaka Main Branch 2. Kamwala Branch: Independence Avenue, Kamwala, Lusaka 3. Kitwe Branch: 3 Mega Shopping Centre, Corner of Enos Comba Road and Independence Avenue, Kitwe.

== Governance ==
The Chairman of the ten-person Board of Directors of UBA Zambia, is Dr. Tukiya Kankasa-Mabula. Chinedu Obeta, serves as the Managing Director and CEO of the bank.

== See also ==
- Economy of Zambia
- List of banks in Zambia
- List of banks in Africa
- Bank of Zambia
- United Bank for Africa
