= Osa Igiehon =

Nigerian engineer (born 1970)

- Born: Osayande Igiehon; 9 November 1970 (age 56)
- Education: University of Benin
- Occupations: CEO, Heirs Energies
- Years active: 1997–present

Osayande (Osa) Igiehon (born 9 November 1970) is a Nigerian engineer and energy executive who has served as the Chief Executive Officer of Heirs Energies Ltd since 2021.

== Early life ==
Osayande Igiehon was born and raised in Nigeria. He holds a Bachelor's degree in Electrical and Electronics Engineering from the University of Benin

== Career ==
=== Shell ===
Igiehon began his career at Shell in the early 2000s, working in various leadership roles across Nigeria, the Netherlands, Gabon, and Russia. During his time at Shell Gabon, he oversaw a business transformation that included transitioning the company to new ownership.

From 2011 to 2013, Igiehon served as Chairman of the Nigerian Council of the Society of Petroleum Engineers.

=== Heirs Energies ===
In 2021, Igiehon became CEO of Heirs Energies, a subsidiary of Heirs Holdings Group. Heirs Energies operates in oil and gas exploration, production, and power generation.

Under Igiehon's leadership, Heirs Energies reported increasing oil production at its OML 17 block from 27,000 to 52,000 barrels per day. The company states it manages approximately 5% of Nigeria's total oil production. Heirs Energies has also reported improvements in its terminal delivery rate, citing increases from 3% in December 2021 to 85% by 2024.

Igiehon has participated in energy industry events including the Future Investment Initiative in Riyadh, African Energy Week in Cape Town, and the German-African Energy Forum in Hamburg.
