= D. K. Mensah =

Ghanaian banker, economist, and educator (1953–2020)

Daniel Ato Kwamina Mensah
- Born: 24 October 1953; Takoradi, Ghana
- Died: 17 July 2020 (aged 66); Accra, Ghana
- Education: University of Ghana; University of Ibadan; Ghana Institute of Management and Public Administration
- Occupations: banker, economist and educator
- Children: 3

Daniel Ato Kwamina Mensah (24 October 1953 – 17 July 2020) was a Ghanaian banker, research economist and former educator. He was the chief executive officer of the Ghana Association of Bankers for 27 years since 1993. He died on 17 July 2020 at the age of 66 after a short illness. Prior to his death in 2020, he was supposed to retire from the position of CEO of the GBT later in the year.

== Career ==
Mensah completed his BA degree in Economics and Political Science from the University of Ghana; MsC in International Trade from the University of Ibadan and MBA from the Ghana Institute of Management and Public Administration. He was also a fellow of Chartered Institute of Bankers, Institute of Loan and Risk Management and a member of Chartered Institute of Marketing.

He initially pursued his career as an educator teaching in primary, secondary and tertiary sectors before venturing into banking career in 1985. He was employed as a research economist by the National Investment Bank in 1985. During his stint as a research economist with the National Investment Bank, he conducted sectoral studies for investment planning in private and public sector financing. In July 1993, he was officially appointed as the CEO of the Ghana Bankers' Association. He also was the president of West African Bankers' Association from 1995 to 1997.
