= Osei Tutu Senior High School =

Osei Tutu Boys' School
- ABREMPƆN
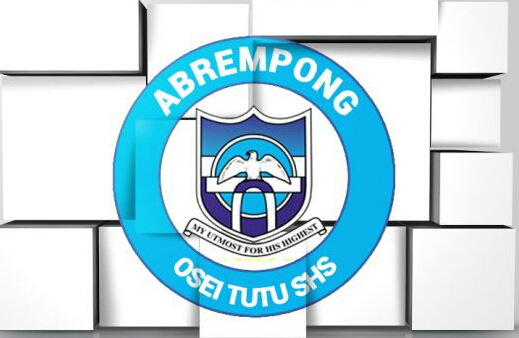

Location
- Kumasi, Ashanti Region, Ghana; Ashanti; Kumasi, Ghana; 6.7375°N 1.7231°W

Information
- Type: Public – Senior secondary
- Motto: My Utmost for His Highest
- Established: 1940
- School district: Atwima Nwabiagya
- Headmaster: Very Rev.Bright Yaw Osei
- Chaplain: Rev.Kenneth Akromah-Darkwah
- Staff: about 170
- Grades: Senior Secondary Years 1–3
- Enrollment: 4500+
- Houses: 11
- Colors: White and Blue
- Nickname: Vacus O.T / Vacus Land
- Affiliation: Methodist Church Ghana
- Alumni: Abrempong
- Website: https://www.otshs.edu.gh/

Osei Tutu Senior High School is an all-boys Methodist senior high school located in Akropong in the Ashanti Region of Ghana. It is ranked among the best senior high schools in the Ashanti Region and in Ghana.

Established in 1940 as one of the Royal Institutions in the Ashanti Region, Osei Tutu began as a boys’ boarding school to a training college before being converted into a secondary institution in the early 1970s.

== History ==
Established in 1940 as one of the Royal Institutions in the Ashanti Region, Osei Tutu Senior High School (named after the founder of the Ashanti Kingdom Otumfuo Osei Tutu I), is seen as an epitome of the rich culture and tradition of Asanteman.

The school was founded by the Methodist Church of Ghana and started as a Middle Boys Boarding School at a bungalow at the Freeman College, opposite the Wesley College in Kumasi.

The school started with its first headmaster, Rev. Arthur W. Banks (M.A B.Sc). He was assisted by both Messrs A. C. Denteh and Eric Awua, with just 13 students. These students included: Charles Graham, one-time senior lecturer of KNUST Isaac Oguame Tenney (B.Sc, B.Com), former solicitor and advisor to the Bank of Ghana Peter Kofi (B.A, B.Com), and Black Stars midfielder and coach James Adjei.

The school was moved to its current location at Asante-Akropong in 1948 under the leadership of J.G Quansa who was the then Manager of Avenida Hotel in Accra. Enrollment at the time was 120 boys and 5 teachers. The school was however closed down in November 1954 because parents could not afford the increase in school fees.

On 24 November 1955, the school was reopened as a two-year Certificate 'B' Training College with the late A.K Folson as its first principal. This phase began with 60 students and 5 tutors.

Folson was succeeded by C.K Yamoah, B.D (London), a one-time President of the Methodist Church on 20 September 1961. At the time, the student population stood at 160 with 7 tutors.

The college later changed from a two-year Certificate 'B' to a four-year Certificate 'A' in 1965. On 22 September 1966, J.O.T Ansah B.A (Hons) D.A, E.d succeeded Yamoah as principal.

In the 1972-1973 Academic year, when a number of Training Colleges in the country were converted into secondary schools, Osei Tutu Training College was affected and had to be run as a dual institution until the Training College component was phased out.

J.O.T Ansah led the conversion of the school from a training college into a secondary school and was succeeded by Amo Polley, who was Vice Principal of the school.

== Mission ==
Osei Tutu SHS is a Methodist institution set up to achieve high level of academic and moral excellence with a view to serving as a torch bearer to reflect the hopes and aspirations of Asanteman in particular and Ghanaians in general.

== Competitions ==
The school has since been competing at the National Science and Maths Quiz over the years. It has also competed in the Luv FM high school debate and many more.

== Achievements ==
The school won the Ashanti regional zonal debate for the 2020 independence debate.It received the most disciplined school in the Super Zonal athletics competition.In 2025 the school won the ACE spoken word.In 2025 the school was placed third in the national public speaking held at the parliament house.The school also won the Ashanti Regional garbage sorting competition.

== Notable alumni ==
The school has produced several notable alumni, including:

- John Agyekum Kufour (former president of Ghana)
- Kweku Etrew Amua-Sekyi (Supreme Court Judge and Chairman of the National Reconciliation Committee of Ghana)m
- Samuel Sarpong former Ashanti Regional Minister
- Nana Owusu-Nsiah, former Inspector General of the Ghana Police Service
- John Awuah, banker
- Kelvyn Boy, Afrobeat singer and songwriter
- Frank Amoakohene, Ashanti Regional Minister.
