= Ngozi Okolie =

Member of House of Reps for Aniocha/Oshimili Federal Constituency of Delta State

Ngozi Lawrence Okolie

Personal details
- Born: Nigeria
- Occupation: Politician

Ngozi Lawrence Okolie is a Nigerian politician and member representing Aniocha/Oshimili federal constituency of Delta State in the Nigerian National Assembly.

== Political career ==
A member of the Labour Party, LP Okolie defeated incumbent Minority Leader of the Federal House of Representatives Ndudi Elumelu of the Peoples Democratic Party, PDP. Okolie polled 53,879 votes to beat Elumelu who scored 33,466 votes in the February 25, 2023 National Assembly elections. Prior to the election, Ngozi was considered a political underdog and a no match to Elumelu who has been the lawmaker representing the constituency in the House of Reps. His win over Elumelu was one of the major political upsets in the 2023 general elections attributed to the effect of the popularity of LP presidential Candidate Peter Obi.

He was once Director General of the Direct Labour Agency, and later Commissioner-Special Duties (Direct Labour Agency).
