= Francesca Yetunde Emanuel =

Nigerian politician and actress (1933–2020)

Francesca Emanuel
- Born: Francesca Yetunde Emanuel; 19 September 1933 (age 92); Lagos, Nigeria
- Died: 8 April 2020
- Other names: Yetunde
- Education: University College, London University of Ibadan
- Known for: Nigeria's first female federal permanent secretary First female administrative officer
- Spouse: Dr Leonard Abosede Emmanuel
- Children: Muyiwa Emanuel
- Awards: Commander of Order of the Niger (CON)

Francesca Yetunde Emanuel (née Pereira; 19 September 1933 – 8 April 2020) was a Nigerian civil servant. She was the country's first female administrative officer and the first woman to serve as a federal permanent secretary. She was also awarded the national honour of Commander of Order of the Niger (CON).

== Early life and education ==
Francesca Yetunde Pereira was born on 19 September 1933. She attended Holy Child College, Lagos for her secondary education and attended University of Ibadan, where she obtained a bachelor's degree in geography. In 1955, she obtained the Inter-B.A. and transferred to University College London, where she graduated with a Bachelor of Arts (honours) degree in geography in 1959.

== Career ==
Emanuel joined the Federal Nigerian Civil Service in 1959 as the first female administrative officer, beginning as an assistant secretary at the Federal Ministry of Works and Housing from 1959 to 1960.

During her career, she worked at the Federal Ministry of Establishment from 1960 to 1961 and the Police Affairs Division in the Cabinet Office from 1961 to 1964. In 1964, she was appointed senior assistant secretary, Secretariat of the Morgan Commission on Nigerian Workers. She was the under-secretary for the Federal Ministry of Commerce and Industry from 1964 to 1969. She served as the deputy secretary at the Federal Ministry of Works and Housing from 1969 to 1973. Emanuel was the principal secretary for the Cabinet Office from 1973 to 1974 and secretary for the Federal Public Service Commission in 1975. Her appointment as permanent secretary in the Public Service Department of the Cabinet Office in July 1975 made her the first female federal permanent secretary, and she served there for 13 years.

Upon her voluntary retirement in 1988, she received the Federal Directors-General (Permanent Secretaries) Retirement Award for Brilliant Performances and Outstanding Achievement.

== Arts ==
At the first Nigerian Festival of the Arts in Lagos in 1950, she won her first prize as a soprano soloist while still a secondary school student. She was a member of the pioneer musical group, the Steve Rhodes Voices, and an actress, appearing in Wole Soyinka's earliest plays in the 1960s. She was cast in his first major play, A Dance of the Forests, which was performed at the Nigerian Independence celebrations in 1960. She was a member of Soyinka's professional theatre company, the 1960 Masks. She was recognised with the Glover Memorial Centennial Award for Services to Arts and Culture in Lagos State in 2000. She was on the board of governors as well as a member of the Musical Society of Nigeria when they opened MUSON Centre, Onikan, Lagos. She was a performer who helped in nurturing different aesthetics arts and culture management and has administered projects such as the MUSON Festival, the second National Film Festival and the Macmillan literary events. She was also a member of the board of trustees of the National Association of Nigerian Theatre Arts Practitioners (NANTAP). She actively supported many organisations such as the Lumina Foundation, Crown Troupe of Africa, the Bariga Artists Forum, and the Artist Village, National Theatre Annex. She held both member and leadership positions in several public and private organisations, such as the governing board of the Federal Society for the Blind (1992), the Special Olympic Nigeria (1989), and the fundraising committee of the Nigerian Sickle Cell Foundation (1977). She was a founding member of the Nigerian Conservation Foundation.

== Personal life ==
In 1964, she married Leonard Abosede Emmanuel, an obstetrician and gynaecologist. The couple had one child, Muyiwa.

Emanuel died on 8 April 2020, at the age of 86.

== Awards and honours ==
- The Federal Directors-General (Permanent Secretaries) Retirement Award for Brilliant Performances and Outstanding Achievement (1988).
- Glover Memorial Centennial Award for Services to Arts and Culture, Lagos State (2000).
- Commander of the Order of the Niger (CON).
