= Ndudi Elumelu =

Nigerian politician (born 1965)

The Honourable Ndudi Elumelu

Minority Leader of the House of Representatives of Nigeria
- Incumbent
- Assumed office July 2019
- Preceded by: Ogor Okuweh

Member of the House of Representatives of Nigeria
- Incumbent
- Assumed office 2019
- Preceded by: Joan Onyemaechi Mrakpor

Chairman House Committee on Health
- In office 2011–2015

Chairman House Committee on Power
- In office 2007–2010

Member of the House of Representatives of Nigeria
- In office 2007–2015
- Succeeded by: Joan Onyemaechi Mrakpor

Personal details
- Born: 23 February 1965 (age 61) Jos Plateau State, Nigeria
- Party: Peoples Democratic Party (PDP)
- Occupation: Legislature

Ndudi Godwin Elumelu (born 23 February 1965) is a Nigerian politician representing Aniocha and Oshimili federal constituency in the House of Representatives. His net worth is estimated to be about 500 Million Dollars as of 2023, He is currently the minority leader of the House of Representatives, and a younger brother to Tony Elumelu.

== Background and early life ==
Ndudi was born on 23 February 1965 in Jos, Plateau State, Nigeria. He is from Onicha Ukwa in Aniocha North Local Government Area of Delta State. He obtained his West African Secondary School Certificate from Lagos State school of art and science in 1986 and got his National Diploma in Business Administration from Yaba College of Technology in 1989. In 1993, he obtained a degree in accounting from Edo State University, Ekpoma, and master's degree in Business Administration from the same school in 2000.

== Political career ==
Ndudi was first elected into the House of Representatives in 2007 and was re-elected in 2011. During his first two terms, he was chairman House Committee on Power from 2007 to 2010 and chairman House Committee on Health from 2011 to 2015. In 2014, he contested for the governorship primaries of Delta State which he lost, thereby losing his seat at the house to Joan Onyemaechi Mrakpor. In 2019, he returned to the House of Representatives for a third term.

In 2021, Mr. Ndudi Elumelu launched an empowerment program with 456 recipients chosen from the Constituency. In 2022, he won the People's Democratic party house of representatives primaries. In February 2023, he lost the house of representatives election to the Labour Party candidate Ngozi Okolie.

== Awards ==
Ndudi Godwin Elumelu received the Hollywood and African Prestigious Awards in Los Angeles, United States, as the Best Lawmaker on Constituency Development and Effective Representation and Empowerment programme.
