= Peter Ikenga =

Nigerian business executive

- Citizenship: Nigerian
- Education: University of Texas at Austin, Federal University of Technology Owerri
- Occupation: Business executive
- Employer: Transnational Corporation of Nigeria

Peter Ikenga is a Nigerian business executive. He is currently the managing director and chief executive officer of Transcorp Energy Limited. He is also the managing director and chief executive officer of Transcorp Power Limited.

== Career ==
Ikenga graduated with a Bachelor of Engineering degree in Electrical and Electronics Engineering from Federal University of Technology Owerri, Nigeria and went on to get a Master of Business Administration degree from The University of Texas at Austin, United States of America.

In 2021, he was appointed managing director and chief executive officer of Transcorp Energy Limited. In September 2023, became the managing director and chief executive officer at Transcorp Power Limited.
