= Joan Onyemaechi Mrakpor =

Nigerian politician

Joan Oyemaechi Mrakpor

Aniocha South Senator
- In office 2007–2015
- Constituency: Aniocha South

Personal details
- Born: 7 July 1966 (age 59) Delta, Nigeria
- Party: People's Democratic Party (PDP)
- Children: 5
- Profession: Television Envagelist

Joan Onyemaechi Mrakpor (born 1966) is a Nigerian Christian evangelist and politician of Anioma heritage. She is a member of the People's Democratic Party and has since 2015 represented Aniocha North-Aniocha South-Oshimili North-Oshimili South in the House of Representatives. Prior to her election into national level politics, Onyemaechi served as a member of the Delta State House of Assembly for Aniocha South from 2007 to 2015.

== Education ==
Onyemaechi began her early education at Ubulu Primary School and earned her First School Leaving Certificate in 1976. She attended Itoshan Grammar School Benin City where she received her West African Senior School Certificate (1982). She then proceeded to the University of Jos, graduating with B.A. in English language in 1992. She also obtained a Postgraduate diploma (PgD) from the Nigerian Institute of Journalism two years later. Between 2004 and 2005, Onyemaechi pursued additional studies at the Thames Valley University and Manchester Business School, both in the UK.

== Political career ==
She was elected into the Delta State House of Assembly in 2007 to represent the constituency of Aniocha South. She was reelected in 2011 and in 2015 was elected to the National Assembly as a member of the People's Democratic Party. She currently represents Aniocha North-Aniocha South-Oshimili North-Oshimili South constituency in the House of Representatives.

== Personal life ==
Onyemaechi is married to Peter Mrakpor, a lawyer and current Delta State Attorney General and Commissioner of Justice. They are blessed with 5 children
