= Ghana Association of Banks =

Organization of Ghana

- Abbreviation: GAB
- Formation: May 29, 1980; 46 years ago
- Legal status: Trade association
- Purpose: Support and advocate for the banking industry
- Region served: Ghana
- Leader: John Awuah
- Website: gab.com.gh
- Formerly called: Ghana Association of Bankers

Ghana Association of Banks (GAB) is the Ghanaian umbrella body and trade association that governs and provides advocacy for Ghanaian banks and bankers.
