= Oliver Alawuba =

Nigerian banker, and business leader

- Born: Oliver Chukwudum Alawuba; 20 June 1966 (age 60)
- Education: Abia State University, University of Ibadan
- Occupations: GMD/CEO, United Bank for Africa
- Known for: United Bank for Africa
- Spouse: Professor Nkeiruka Oly-Alawuba
- Children: 7

Oliver Alawuba (born 20 June 1966) is a Nigerian banker and corporate business leader. He is Group Managing Director and CEO of United Bank for Africa, one of Africa's leading financial services group.

== Education ==
Oliver has a degree in Food Technology from Abia State University, Uturu, an M.Sc. from the University of Ibadan and an MBA in Banking & Finance from Olabisi Onabanjo University. He is also an alumnus of the London Business School, UK –Senior Executive Programme and INSEAD, France – Advanced Management Programme.

== Career ==
Alawuba career in financial services spans over 25 years after his short foray into academia. Prior to UBA's Merger with Standard Trust Bank (STB), he joined Standard Trust Bank (STB) as a pioneer staff in 1997 rising through the ranks in the UBA Group. He has served as country CEO for Ghana and Cote d'Ivoire, Regional CEO for Anglophone, executive director, East Bank (Nigeria) and Group Deputy Managing Director/CEO, covering Nigeria and other 19 subsidiaries in the Rest of Africa.

In 2020, Alawuba was appointed as Group Deputy Managing Director/CEO, UBA Africa covering Subsidiaries in 19 African Countries. As DMD/CEO, UBA Africa in 2021, UBA won the Banker's award for African Bank of the Year award for year in 13 countries.

In August 2022, Oliver Alawuba assumed his appointment as the Group Managing Director of United Bank for Africa following the retirement of Kennedy Uzoka. Alawuba is an Honorary Senior member of the Chartered Institute of Bankers of Nigeria, a Fellow of the Nigeria Institute of Management (FNIM) and a Member of the Nigeria Institute of Directors (M. IoD)/

== Awards and honours ==
- The Chartered Institute of Bankers of Nigeria conferred Alawuba with the fellowship of the Chartered Institute of Bankers of Nigeria, the highest honour for bankers during the institute's 2023 investiture ceremony
- Imo State University (IMSU) Owerri - Honorary Doctorate Degree in Banking and Finance in 2023
- In 2023, University of Ibadan (UI) appointed Oliver Alawuba, as an ambassador of the university following the commemoration of its 75th anniversary.

== Personal life ==
Oliver Alawuba is married to Prof. Nkeiruka Oly-Alawuba.They have seven children together
