= United Bank for Africa Kenya Limited =

Kenya commercial bank

Coordinates: 01°15′34″S 36°48′16″E

- Type: Private
- Industry: Banking
- Founded: 2009
- Headquarters: Nairobi, Kenya
- Key people: Mary Mulili; Managing Director
- Products: Loans, transaction accounts, savings, investments, debit cards
- Revenue: ▲Aftertax:US$683,259 (KES:68 million) (H1:2016)
- Number of employees: 70 (2016)
- Parent: United Bank for Africa
- Website: www.ubagroup.com/countries/KE

United Bank for Africa Kenya Limited, commonly referred to as UBA Kenya, is a commercial bank in Kenya. It is licensed and supervised by the Central Bank of Kenya, the central bank and national banking regulator.

The bank is a small-sized commercial bank in Kenya, the largest economy in the East African Community. UBA Kenya Limited is a subsidiary of the Nigerian financial conglomerate United Bank for Africa, with subsidiaries in 20 African countries, the United States, the United Kingdom and France.

== History ==
Established in 2009, with capital investment of KES:2.5 billion (approx. US $ 25 million), the bank has accumulated losses of KES:1.4 billion (approx. US $ 14 million) in the seven years that followed. UBA Kenya made a profit for the first time during the first half of 2016.

== Ownership ==
United Bank for Africa (Kenya) is a wholly owned subsidiary of United Bank for Africa, headquartered in Lagos, Nigeria.

== Branches ==
The bank maintains networked branches at the following locations:

1. Westlands Branch - Apollo Centre, Westlands, Nairobi (Main Branch)
2. Upper Hill Branch - NHIF Building, Upper Hill, Nairobi
3. Industrial Area Branch - Industrial Area, Enterprise Road, Nairobi

== See also ==
- List of banks in Kenya
- Central Bank of Kenya
- Economy of Kenya
