= Emmanuel Nnorom =

Nigerian business executive (born 1958)

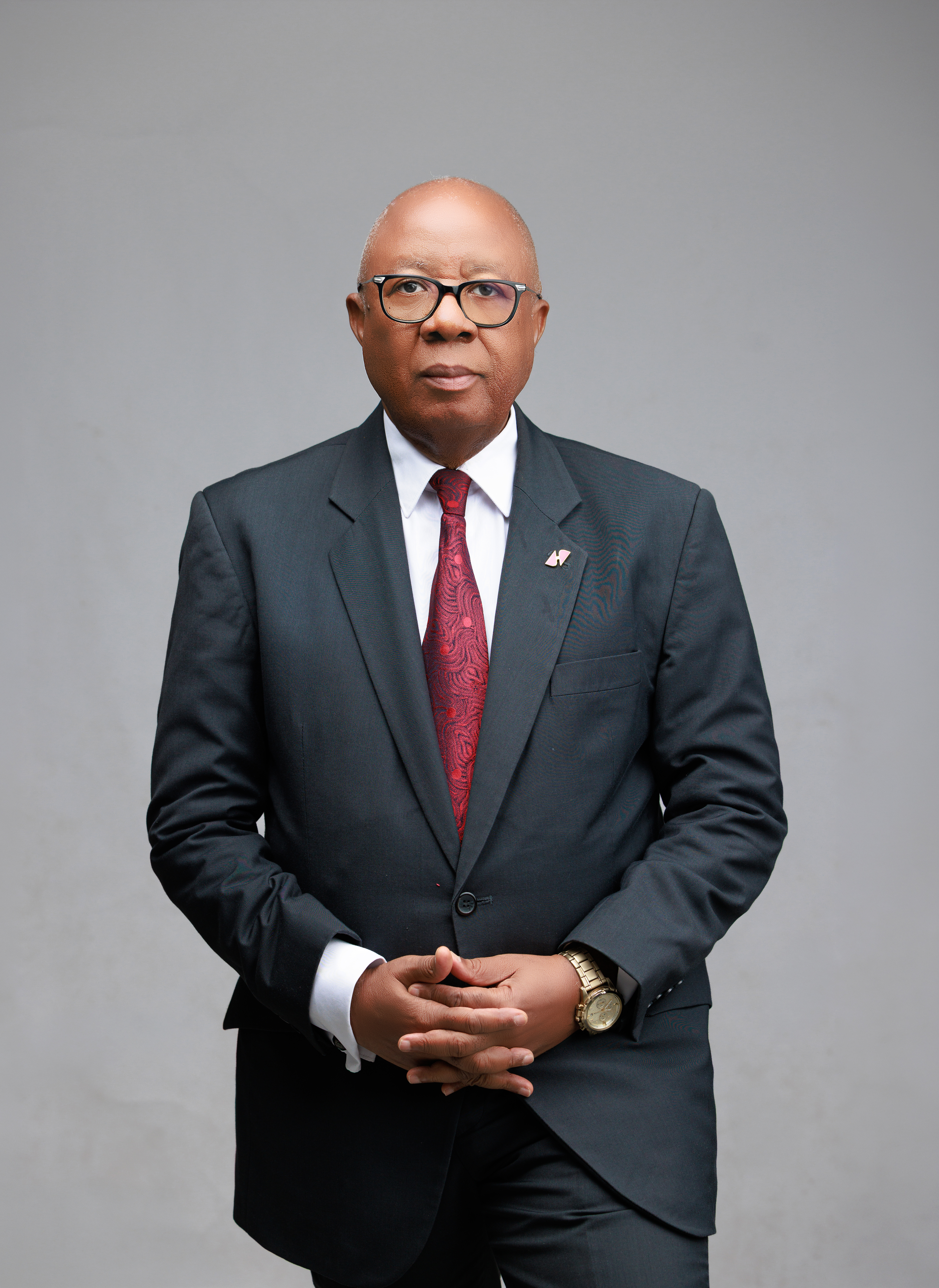
Emmanuel N. Nnorom

Emmanuel Nwabuikwu “Emma” Nnorom (born April 7, 1958) is a Nigerian business executive and chartered accountant. He is the Group Chairman of United Bank for Africa Plc (UBA), a position he assumed on August 21, 2026, succeeding Tony Elumelu, who retired after completing the maximum 12-year tenure permitted for non-executive directors of banks under Central Bank of Nigeria regulations.. He previously served as the Group Chief Executive Officer of Heirs Holdings, Chairman of Transcorp Hotels Plc and former president and chief executive officer Transnational Corporation of Nigeria Plc (Transcorp Plc). He was appointed to the position in 2014.

== Early life and education ==
Nnorom was born on 7 April 1958 and hails from Ovim in Isuikwuato LGA of Abia State. He attended Templeton College, Oxford, where he completed executive leadership and management programmes.

Nnorom has been president and chief executive officer of Transnational Corporation of Nigeria since September 2014.

== Personal life ==
Nnorom is married to Elder Florence Ihuoma Nnorom, and they are blessed with children and grandchildren. He is an elder and trustee of the Presbyterian Church of Nigeria.

== Career ==
=== Banking career ===
Nnorom's early career included senior management positions at Standard Trust Bank (later merged into UBA), Diamond Bank, NUB International Bank and Liberty Merchant Bank, where his responsibilities covered finance, operations, planning, risk management, information technology, human resources and regulatory affairs.

He subsequently joined United Bank for Africa, where he held a series of senior executive roles, including Group Chief Financial Officer, Group Chief Operating Officer, executive director for Finance, executive director for Risk, and executive director in the Group Executive Office. He went on to serve as managing director of UBA Africa, overseeing the group's subsidiaries in 18 African countries and coordinating execution of its regional strategy.

==== Transcorp ====
Nnorom was president and chief executive officer of Transnational Corporation Plc (Transcorp) from September 2014 to May 2017, managing the conglomerate's investments in power, hospitality, agriculture and energy.

==== Heirs Holdings ====
Since June 2017, Nnorom has served as Group Chief Executive Officer of Heirs Holdings, coordinating investments across financial services, power, healthcare, hospitality, real estate, energy and technology.

===== Return to UBA and Chairmanship =====
Nnorom rejoined UBA's board as a Non-Executive Director in 2023. On 6 July 2026, UBA's board formally accepted Tony Elumelu's retirement and unanimously elected Nnorom as the next Group Chairman, with the appointment taking effect on 21 August 2026. UBA operates in 20 African countries as well as the United Kingdom, the United States, France and the United Arab Emirates, employing about 25,000 people.

Commenting on the succession, Elumelu described Nnorom as a leader of integrity, experience and sound judgement, expressing confidence that the bank would continue to thrive under his leadership.

== Professional affiliations ==
Nnorom is a Fellow of the Institute of Chartered Accountants of Nigeria (ICAN) and an Honorary Member of the Chartered Institute of Bankers of Nigeria (CIBN).
