= Universal Merchant Bank =

Ghanaian financial institution

Universal Merchant Bank (UMB)
- Formerly: Merchant Bank Ghana
- Type: Private company
- Industry: Financial services
- Founded: March 15, 1972; 54 years ago
- Headquarters: Accra, Greater Accra, Ghana
- Number of locations: 10 branches
- Key people: Barfour Osei (Chairman), Philip Oti-Mensah (CEO)
- Products: Banking services
- Number of employees: 582 (2024)
- Website: myumbbank.com

The Universal Merchant Bank (UMB), is a Ghanaian financial institution headquartered in Accra that provides commercial and retail banking services across Ghana.

== History ==
The bank was established on 15 March 1972, the Universal Merchant Bank began its operations as a merchant bank. Over time, the institution expanded its services to encompass retail banking, following the acquisition of a universal banking license in 2005.

== Branch Network ==
The bank's headquarters is situated in the capital city of Ghana, Accra. It operates through various branches and subsidiary entities across multiple locations:

1. Head office - Located at the SSNIT Emporium Building on Liberation Road, Airport City, Accra
2. Abeka UMB Branch - Situated at Opsem House, opposite the SSNIT Building
3. Abossey Okai Branch - Adjacent to the former Fan Milk depot
4. Achimota Branch - Positioned at Mile 7 Junction, in close proximity to the Goil Filling Station
5. Adabraka Branch - Found at 123 Sethi Plaza, near the Adabraka Police Station
6. Airport City Branch - Located on Liberation Road within the SSNIT Emporium Building, Airport City
7. East Legon Branch - Near the East Legon Restaurant
8. Junction Mall Branch - Within the premises of Junction Mall, Nungua
9. Kaneshie Branch - Situated near Hansonic Junction, Fisherman House
10. Labone Branch - Found at 9 Ndebaninge Road, opposite Labone Secondary School
