= United Bank for Africa Uganda Limited =

Commercial bank in Uganda

Coordinates: 00°18′49″N 32°35′17″E

- Type: Subsidiary of United Bank for Africa
- Industry: Financial services
- Founded: 2008; 18 years ago
- Headquarters: Plot. 2, Jinja Road, Kampala, Uganda
- Key people: Mustafa Kigozi Sebbagala (ag. chairman); Kenneth Kisambira (CEO and MD)
- Products: Internet banking, mobile banking, wholesale banking, corporate banking, investment banking, consumer banking, money transfer, debit cards, collections, treasury, trade, savings accounts, current accounts
- Revenue: ▲ After tax: USh 16.53 billion (US$4.47 million) (2025)
- Total assets: USh 725.868 billion (US$196.107 million) (2025)
- Number of employees: 411 (2024)
- Parent: United Bank for Africa
- Website: www.ubauganda.com

United Bank for Africa Uganda Limited, also UBA Uganda, is a commercial bank in Uganda. It is licensed by the Bank of Uganda, the central bank and national banking regulator. UBA Uganda is a subsidiary of the United Bank for Africa, headquartered in Lagos, Nigeria, with a presence in twenty African countries, the United Kingdom, France, and the United States. The stock of UBA Transnational trades on the Nigeria Stock Exchange under the symbol UBA.

== Location ==
The headquarters of UBA Uganda are located at Plot 2, Jinja Road, in the central business district of Kampala, the capital and largest city in Uganda. The geographical coordinates of the bank's headquarters are:00°18'49.0"N, 32°35'17.0"E (Latitude:0.313611; Longitude:32.588056).

== Overview ==
UBA Uganda is a retail bank that serves small and medium enterprises (SMEs), large corporations and individual customers. As of 31 December 2023, UBA Uganda's total assets were USh 623,093,431,000/= (approx. US$164.235 million), with shareholders' equity of USh 142,572,067,000/= (approx. US$37.6 million). As of 31 Dember 2025, the bank had total assets of UGX:725,867,618,000 (approx. US$196,107,000), with shareholders' equity of UGX:176,392,684,000 (approx. US$47,655,870)

== History ==
UBA Uganda commenced operations in May 2008, starting with the opening of the main branch on the Kampala-Jinja Highway in Kampala. The Nigeria-based parent company, United Bank for Africa, started operations in Uganda with a capital base of US$12 million. It was a greenfield start-up.

Within the first six months, the bank established four branches within Kampala and its suburbs. During the following six months, UBA Uganda Limited added two upcountry branches, one in Jinja, about 80 kilometres (50 mi) east of Kampala, and the other in Mbale, a city located about 225 kilometres (140 mi), by road, north-east of the capital.

== Ownership ==
UBA Bank Uganda is a subsidiary of the United Bank for Africa, headquartered in Lagos, Nigeria and with a presence in twenty African countries, the United Kingdom, France, and the United States. The table below illustrates the shareholding in the stock of UBA Bank Uganda, as of December 2023.

United Bank for Africa (Uganda) stock ownership
Rank	Name of owner	Percentage ownership
1	United Bank for Africa Plc	80.0
2	Other investors	20.0
	Total	100.0

== Branch network ==
As of September 2020, UBA Uganda maintained branches at the following locations:

- Jinja Road Branch: Plot. 2 Jinja Road, Kampala (main branch)
- Prestige Branch/Corporate Branch: Plot. 2 Jinja Road, Kampala
- William Street Branch: 17B William Street, Kampala
- Kansanga Branch: Plot. 5277, Block 244, Kansanga, Kampala
- Kikuubo Branch: Downtown, near Senana Supermarket, Kampala
- Makerere University Branch: Makerere University Campus, Kampala
- Bugema University Branch: Bugema University Campus, Bugema, Luweero District
- Jinja Branch: 5 Lady Alice Muloki Road, Jinja
- Mbale Branch: 1-3 Manafwa Road, Mbale
- Fort Portal Branch: 8 Ruhandika Street, Fort Portal
- Mbarara Branch: 94 High Street, Mbarara
- Boulevard Mall Branch: Plot 17/19, Kampala Road, Kampala
- Forest Mall Branch: Forest Mall, Lugogo By-Pass, Kampala
- Ntinda Branch: First Floor, Ntinda Complex, Ntinda, Kampala
- Mukono Branch: First Floor, Cathedral House, Plot 37-39, Mukono
- Gulu Branch: Plot No.15 Queens Avenue, Gulu

== Recent developments ==
Effective 1 October 2021, Bank of Uganda, the central bank and national banking regulator, named UBA Uganda Limited as a primary dealer bank (PDB). PDBs are authorised to "facilitate the buying and selling of treasury bills and bonds to investors who do not have access to the primary market". The seven other PDBs are Stanbic Bank Uganda Limited, Centenary Bank, Standard Chartered Uganda, Absa Bank Uganda Limited, DFCU Bank, Bank of Baroda and Housing Finance Bank.

== See also ==
- Banking in Uganda
- List of banks in Uganda
