= Tony Elumelu =

Nigerian banker and philanthropist (born 1963)

Tony Elumelu CFR
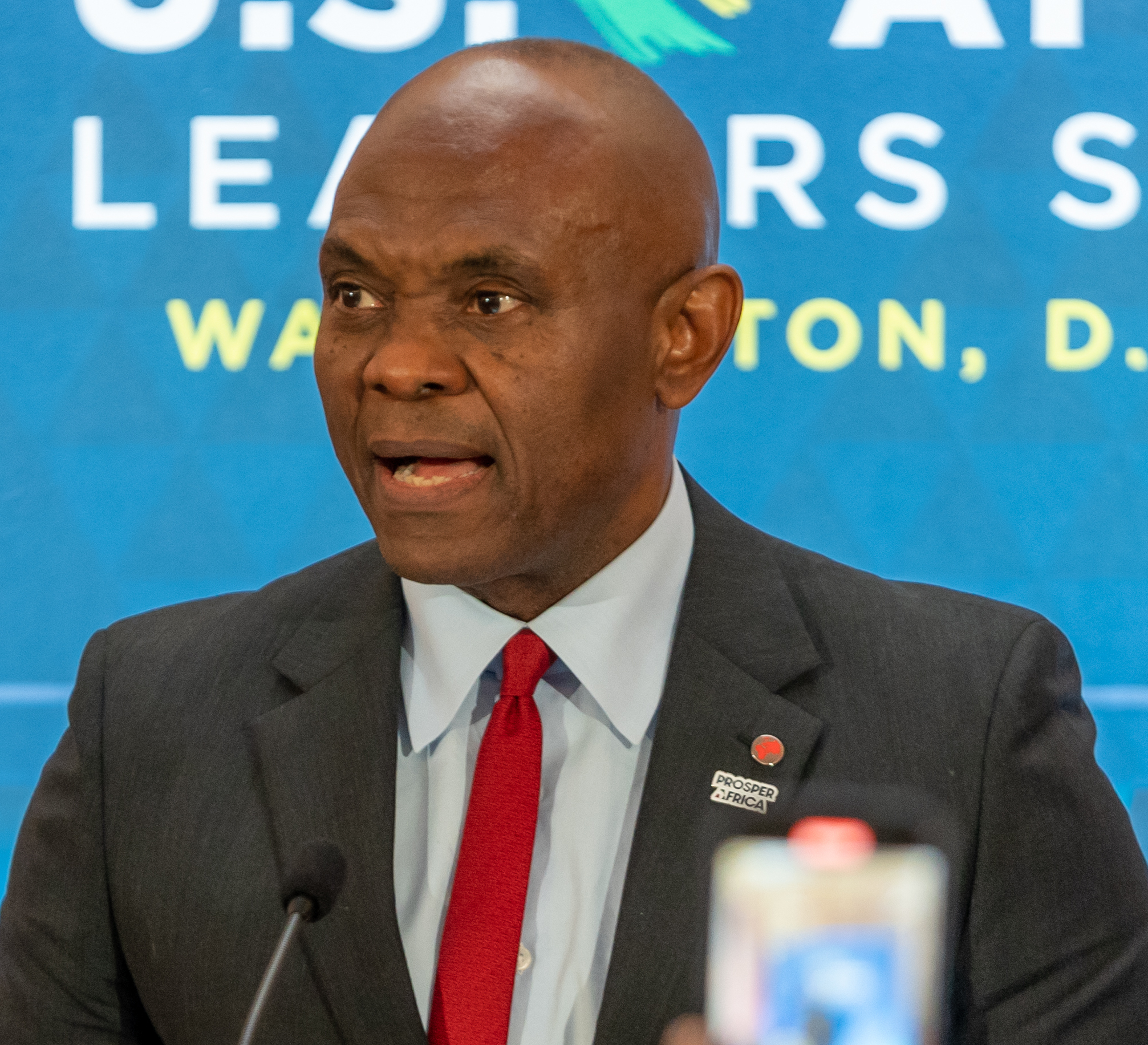
- Elumelu in 2022
- Born: Anthony Onyemaechi Elumelu; 22 March 1963 (age 63); Jos, Northern Region, Nigeria (now in Plateau State, Nigeria)
- Education: Ambrose Alli University, University of Lagos
- Occupations: Chairman and Founder, Heirs Holdings; founder, The Tony Elumelu Foundation
- Years active: 1987–present
- Known for: Africapitalism; Founding Heirs Holdings, The Tony Elumelu Foundation and STB and UBA Merger
- Spouse: Awele Elumelu
- Children: 7

Anthony Onyemaechi Elumelu CFR (born 22 March 1963) is a Nigerian economist, entrepreneur, investor, banker and philanthropist. He chairs Heirs Holdings, Transcorp and is the founder of The Tony Elumelu Foundation.

In 2020, Elumelu was included in Time's list of the 100 most influential people in the world.

== Early life and education ==
Elumelu was born in Jos, Plateau, Nigeria, on 22 March 1963, to Suzanne and Dominic Elumelu, originally an Igbo man from Onicha-Ukwu with close border to Issele-Uku in Aniocha North Local Government Area of Delta State. He grew up with four siblings, one of whom is Ndudi Elumelu, the minority leader in the Nigerian legislature.

Elumelu studied Economics at Ambrose Alli University, obtaining a Bachelor of Science with a Lower Second Class (2:2). He then obtained a Master of Science degree in Economics from the University of Lagos.

== Career ==
=== Early career ===
Elumelu worked in the Nigerian Bank Union Bank as a corps member during his National Youth Service Corps in 1985, before starting his career as a salesman. He subsequently joined Allstates Trust Bank

On his early career, he has said:

I started my career as a salesman, a copier salesman to be specific, young, hungry, and hardworking, but the reality was that I was just one of the thousands of young Nigerian graduates, all eager to succeed.

In 1997, Elumelu led a small group of investors to take over a struggling Crystal Bank (later renamed Standard Trust Bank). He turned it profitable within a few years and in 2005, he led one of the largest mergers in the banking sector in Sub-Saharan Africa by acquiring United Bank for Africa (UBA).

=== United Bank for Africa ===
Following the merger of Standard Trust Bank and United Bank for Africa in 2005, Elumelu led the company as group managing director from a single-country banking group to a pan-African bank with subsidiaries in 20 African countries, France, the U.S. and the U.K. He stepped down in 2010.

Tony Elumelu officially retired as Group Chairman of the United Bank for Africa (UBA) on August 21, 2026. His departure complied with the Central Bank of Nigeria's corporate governance guidelines, which mandate a maximum 12-year tenure limit for non-executive bank directors. Emmanuel N. Nnorom succeeded him as the new Group Chairman.

=== Heirs Holdings ===
In 2010, he founded Heirs Holdings, his family-owned investment holding company. Elumelu also established in the same year the Tony Elumelu Foundation, an Africa-based foundation championing entrepreneurship in Africa. Heirs Holdings maintains a portfolio of investments across several sectors. Through Heirs Holdings, Elumelu holds a controlling interest in Transnational Corporation, a diversified conglomerate with business interests in Power, Hospitality and Energy.

=== Transcorp Plc ===
On 14 April 2021, Elumelu was officially given the Certificate of Discharge of the iconic hospitality facility. The National Council on Privatisation (NCP), which is chaired by the former Vice President of Nigeria Prof. Yemi Osinbajo, handed over full ownership of Transcorp Hotels to the chairman after fulfilling all privatization conditions attached to the sale of the property in 2005.

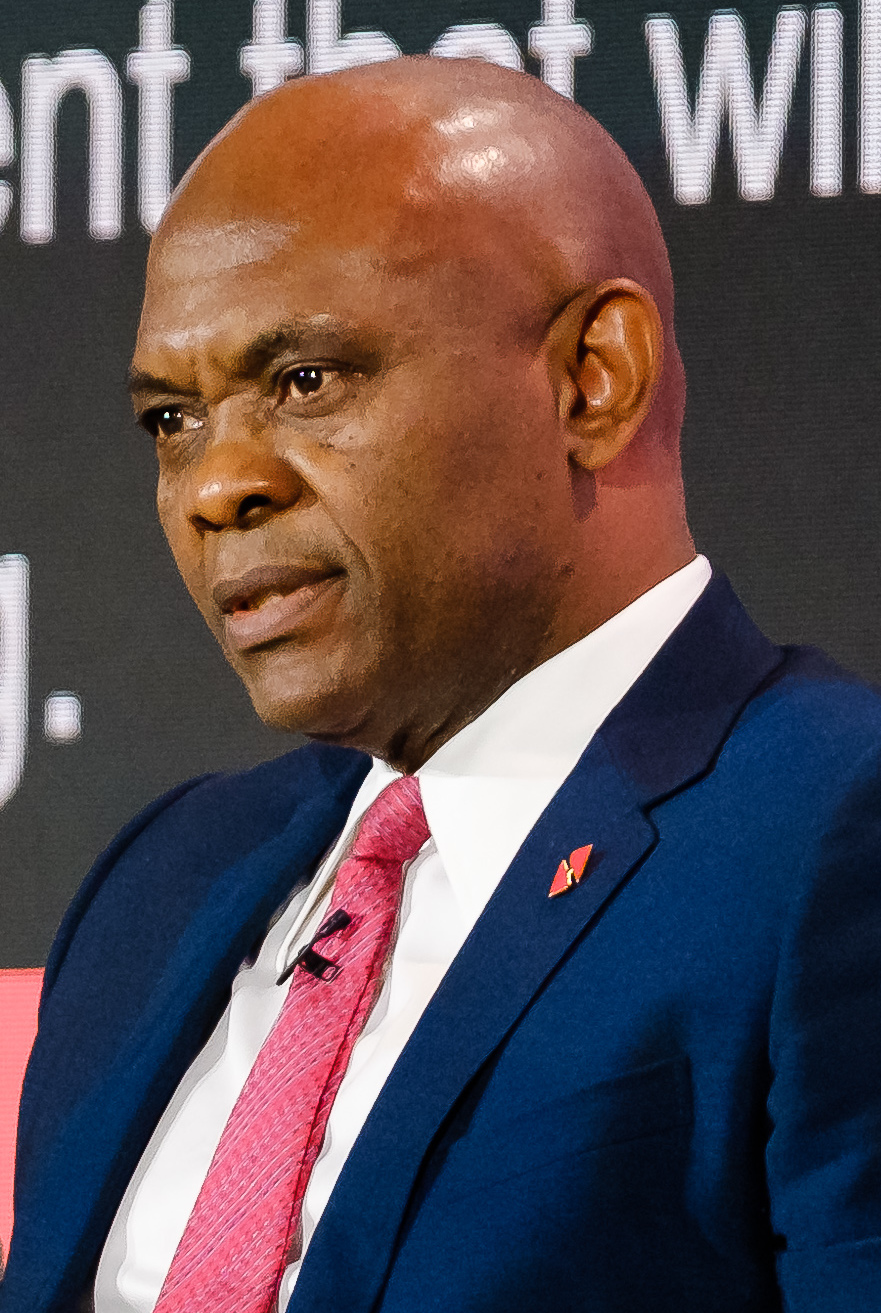
Elumelu speaking in 2020

=== The Tony Elumelu Foundation ===
Following his retirement from United Bank for Africa in 2010, Elumelu founded The Tony Elumelu Foundation, which promotes entrepreneurship in Africa. The foundation's belief that the private sector's role is critical for Africa's development is hinged on the economic philosophy of Africapitalism, which was introduced by Elumelu; "that the African private sector has the power to transform the continent through long-term investments, creating both economic prosperity and social wealth."

In 2015, Elumelu committed $100 million to create 10,000 entrepreneurs across Africa over the next 10 years through the Tony Elumelu Foundation Entrepreneurship Programme - a Pan-African entrepreneurship initiative designed to empower African entrepreneurs through a multi-year programme of training, funding, and mentoring.

== Awards and honours ==
Elumelu has received recognition and praise for his contributions to business and entrepreneurship.

- In 2003, the Federal Government of Nigeria granted Elumelu the title of Member of the Order of the Federal Republic MFR, a national honour.
- In 2012, he was awarded the National Honour of Commander of the Order of the Niger CON for his service in promoting private enterprise.
- In 2016, He was awarded the Daily Times, Nigerian Man of the Year
- In 2018 and 2019 he was awarded the All-Africa Business Leaders Awards (AABLA) Philanthropist of the Year Award
- Bayero University Kano (BUK) gave him an honorary Doctor of Business degree in 2019.
- He was honored with the National Productivity Order of Merit Award in 2019.
- TIME magazine's 100 Most Influential People of 2020.
- In 2020, the Kingdom of Belgium conferred its Highest National Honour, the honorary distinction of Officer in the Order of Leopold, the country's oldest and most important National Honour, on Elumelu.
- On 11 October 2022, Elumelu received the national honour of Commander of the Order of the Federal Republic.
- In 2025, he was included in Ranks Africa Magazine’s list of the "100 Most Impactful People in the Energy Sector".
- TIME magazine’s 100 Most Influential People in Philanthropy of 2026
