= The Tony Elumelu Foundation =

Nonprofit organization in Lagos, Nigeria

- Founded: 2010
- Founder: Tony O. Elumelu
- Type: NGO
- Headquarters: Lagos, Nigeria
- Region served: Africa
- Website: Tonyelumelufoundation.org

The Tony Elumelu Foundation (TEF) is an African non-profit organization founded in 2010 by Tony O. Elumelu and headquartered in Lagos, Nigeria. It is a pioneer member of the Global Impact Investment Rating System (GIIRS).

== History ==
The Tony Elumelu Foundation (TEF) was founded in 2010 by Nigerian businessman Tony O. Elumelu.

== Programmes ==
- The Tony Elumelu Foundation (TEF) Forum: An annual conference designed to bring entrepreneurs across the continent together to network and share ideas, connect with private and public sector leaders in one location to tackle entrepreneurship challenges on the continent. The fifth edition held in Abuja, the Nigerian capital on 26&27 July 2019 and had in attendance Nigeria's vice president, Yemi Osinbajo; Nigeria's First lady, Aisha Buhari; President of the Democratic Republic of Congo, Felix Tshisekedi; President of Rwanda Paul Kagame; Macky Sall, President of Senegal; Ruhakana Rugunda, Prime Minister of Uganda; Director-General, World Health Organization, Tedros Ghebreyesus; and President, African Development Bank, Akinwunmi Adesina, among others.

== Past Activities ==
- The Mtanga Farms Investment: The Foundation's inaugural impact investment was in Mtanga Farms Limited, a mixed arable farming business operating in the Southern Tanzanian Highlands.
- The Elumelu Legacy Prize: An award established by Tony O. and Dr. Awele Elumelu to recognize homegrown academic excellence in subject areas representing their career paths and fields of academic study. The awards were given to the overall best graduating students and best performing students in economics, Business Administration, and Medicine within top tertiary Institutions across Nigeria's six geopolitical zones. It was also given to candidates who have excelled in training programmes from the Chartered Institute of Bankers of Nigeria. The annual Prize was designed to promote academic excellence and inspire the next generation of Nigerian leaders.
- The Elumelu Professionals Programme (EPP) recruits experienced professionals graduating from prestigious Masters in Business Administration and Masters in Public Administration (or Public Policy) programmes to work in SME companies and public sector agencies. The recruits work on specific strategic projects over the course of a 10-week placement. Since 2011, the Foundation has placed over 85 professionals in more than 40 companies across seven countries in Africa.
- The Blair Elumelu Fellowship Programme (BEFP) is a partnership between former British Prime Minister Tony Blair's Africa Governance Initiative and TEF. It was scheduled to run for three years. Tony Blair's office has hailed it as "bringing together the best of innovative European government delivery models with the best of African private sector acumen and execution. "
- The Global Impact Investing Network (GIIN) is a not-for-profit organisation dedicated to increasing the effectiveness of impact investing. TEF is dedicated to impact investing and is a member of the GIIN Investor Council.
- The Foundation's focus on research delivered white papers on different topics in 2012. Their founder, Tony O. Elumelu, contributed to the Nigerian Leadership Initiative's white paper in 2011. The GIIN published a case study in November 2011 on the Foundation's investment in Mtanga Farms
- The Africapitalism Institute also released a comprehensive report on the entrepreneurial ecosystem in Africa, analysing challenges facing African entrepreneurs and their proposed solutions. Titled Unleashing Africa's Entrepreneurs: Improving the Enabling Environment for Start-ups, it was first released to the public at a world-press conference on the sidelines of the 6th Global Entrepreneurship Summit in Nairobi, Kenya on 25 July 2015. The data used was based on original research leveraging the Foundation's pan-African network of over 20,000 early stage African businesses.

A leading light in African philanthropy, TEF has relationships with several other organisations around the world.

== Global Entrepreneurship Summit, Kenya, 2015 ==
During the Global Entrepreneurship Summit that was opened by President Barack Obama, three Tony Elumelu Entrepreneurs were part of the official GES programme and gave "Ignite talks" on their entrepreneurial journey to the global audience including President Obama and President Kenyatta of Kenya. Shadi Sabeh, CEO Brilliant Footsteps Academy, Nigeria; Tonee Ndungu, Founder, Kytabu, Kenya; and Jean Patrick Ehouman, co-founder and President, Akendewa in Côte d'Ivoire were the speakers representing their companies and are beneficiaries of the Tony Elumelu Foundation.

== World Economic Forum on Africa, Kigali, 2016 ==
"Unleashing Africa's Agricultural Entrepreneurs", the Foundation's report on the potentials of agribusinesses in transforming the continent, was launched on the sidelines of the 26th World Economic Forum on Africa in Kigali, Rwanda, 11–13 May 2016. Elumelu was also one of the co-chairs of the forum.

== Tony Elumelu Entrepreneurs: Transforming Africa ==
In June 2016, Tony Elumelu Entrepreneurs: Transforming Africa, a 30-minute documentary film chronicling the story of the Foundation's Entrepreneurship Programme. The documentary has since premiered in different cities across the world from Paris to St. Gallen, Kigali, Lagos and London.
