= Transnational Corporation of Nigeria =

Conglomerate headquartered in Lagos, Nigeria

Transnational Corporation plc
- Type: Conglomerate
- Industry: Energy, Power, Hospitality
- Headquarters: Lagos, Lagos State, Nigeria
- Key people: Tony Elumelu, Group Chairman; Owen Omogiafo, President/GCEO; Sam Nwanze, Director, Tenoil Petroleum & Energy; Chris Ezeafulukwe, CEO, Transcorp Energy Limited; Peter Ikenga, CEO, Transcorp Power Plc; Dupe Olusola, CEO, Transcorp Hotels Plc
- Products: Hotels, energy, power
- Website: transcorpgroup.com

Transnational Corporation Plc (or Transcorp Group) is a diversified conglomerate with strategic investments and core interests in the hospitality, power and energy sectors. A publicly quoted conglomerate with a diversified shareholders base of about 300,000 investors, its notable assets include Transcorp Hotels Plc owner of Transcorp Hilton Hotel, Transcorp Power Plc, Transafam Power Limited, and Transcorp Energy Limited (operator of OPL 281 and AEDC). As of Q2 2023, Transcorp Group's market capitalization is in excess of N540bn.

== Origin ==
Transnational Corporation Plc was incorporated on 16 November 2004. The original concept was that Transcorp would be a conglomerate, similar to the South Korean chaebol conglomerates.

== Transcorp's businesses ==
=== Transcorp Hotels ===
Transcorp Hotels Plc.
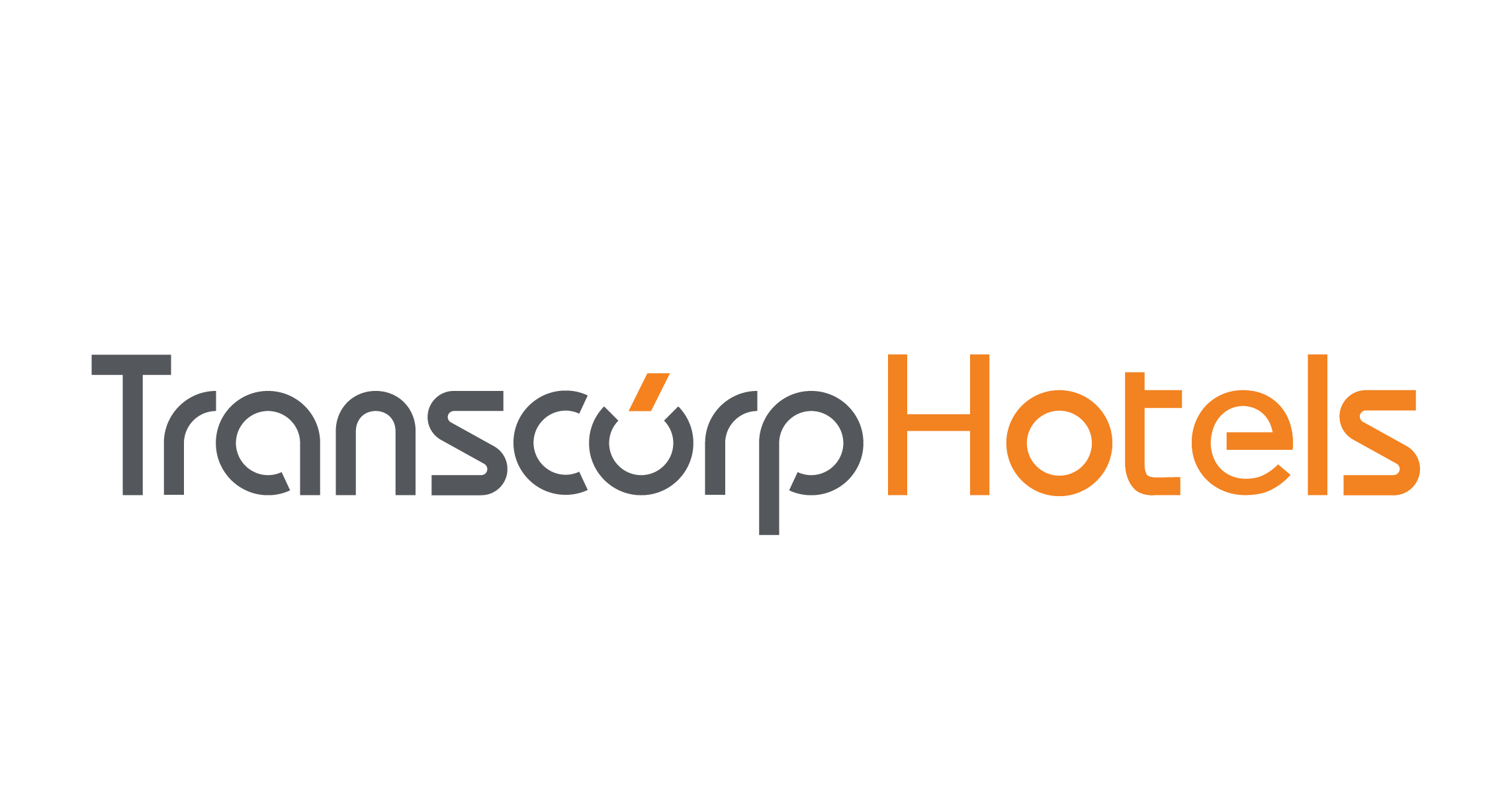
- Type: Company
- Industry: Hospitality
- Headquarters: Maitama, Abuja, Nigeria
- Key people: Emmanuel Nnorom, Chairman; Uzo Oshogwe CEO
- Parent: Transcorp Plc.
- Subsidiaries: Transcorp Hilton Abuja, Aura by Transcorp Hotels
- Website: transcorphotels.com

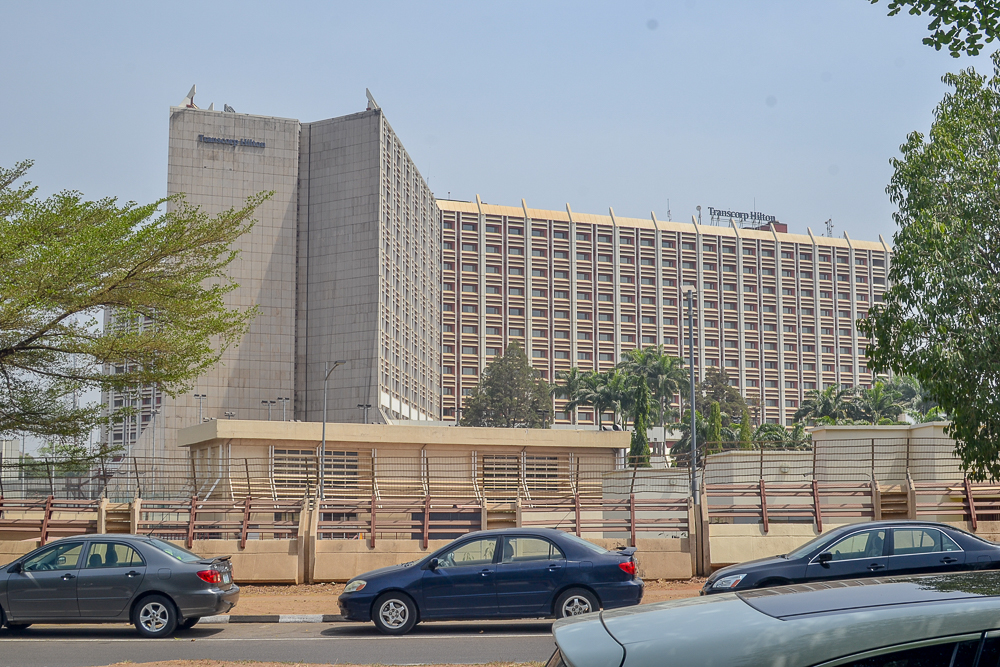
Transcorp Hilton, Abuja

Transcorp Hotels Plc, formerly Transnational Hospitality & Tourism Services Limited (THTSL), is the hospitality subsidiary of Transcorp.

It owns Transcorp Hilton Abuja; the digital hospitality platform; Aura by Transcorp Hotels; and a 5,000-capacity Transcorp Event Centre set to launch in 2024.

In 2005, the Federal Government of Nigeria privatized NIRMSCO Properties Limited – the owner of the Nicon Hilton Hotel, Abuja at the time. As part of a consortium, Transcorp Plc purchased a proprietary stake in the company and became the core investor, while the federal government retained the remaining 49 per cent. Hilton International LLC was engaged to manage the property.

In 2007, the name NIRMSCO Properties Limited was changed to Transnational Hotels & Tourism Services Limited (THTSL). THTSL was the hospitality subsidiary of Transcorp.

In 2013, Transcorp bought out other consortium members and became the sole owner of the 51 per cent controlling shares in THTSL. It secured hosting rights for the World Economic Forum on Africa in 2014.

THTSL was rebranded Transcorp Hotels Plc in 2014, ahead of an initial public offering in October 2014.

In July 2021, Transcorp Hotels Plc launched Aura by Transcorp Hotels, an online platform for booking accommodation, including hotels and apartments, as well as experiences.

=== Transcorp Power Plc ===
Transcorp Power Plc is the owner and operator of the Ughelli Power Plant which was privatized by the Nigerian government along with other Nigerian power plants. The plant has an installed capacity of 1000MW. The plant is located in Delta State and had an available capacity of 480 MW as of November 2015. TUPL has made full payment of $300million for the plant and was the first power generating company to receive its privatization discharge certificate.

== Acquisitions ==
- The Hilton Hotel, Abuja: In December 2005, Transcorp acquired 51% controlling stake in the Hilton Abuja for the sum of $105 million (equivalent at the time to N13.7billion) after a very competitive bid. The remaining 49% is owned by the Bureau of Public Enterprise (BPE).
- Rumens Road: Transcorp acquired Rumens Road Apartments at 1 Rumens Road, Ikoyi, Lagos in 2005 for N377m.
- Oil Blocs: Transcorp acquired two oil blocs in the May 2006 bidding round, consolidated in one oil bloc, OPL 281. Ownership of the OPL 281 oil bloc, which had previously been revoked by the Department of Petroleum Resources, was returned to Transcorp in February 2011 after the payment of the balance of the signature bonus. Transcorp is partnering with Equity Energy Resources (EER), and pan-African energy company SAC-Oil Holdings of South Africa, to take equity and provide resources that will bring the oil bloc into operation.
- Metropolitan Hotel, Calabar: Transcorp acquired the 146-room Metropolitan Hotel in Calabar (re-branded Transcorp Hotels Calabar) in June 2010 and divested in 2023.
- Benfruits Plant: On 29 November 2010, Transcorp signed a lease agreement with the Benue State Government for the Benfruits juice concentrate plant in Markurdi, Benue State.
- Ughelli Power Plant: On 25 September 2012, Transcorp Ughelli Power Limited (TUPL) won the $300 million bid for the acquisition of the Ughelli Power Plant, one of the six power generation companies of the Power Holding Company of Nigeria (PHCN) being privatised by the Federal Government of Nigeria. The Ughelli plant is a thermal power generating plant located in Delta State, Nigeria with installed capacity of 1000MW, but currently producing 330MW which accounts for 8% of Nigeria's total power generation. TUPL met the 25 percent deposit deadline by paying the sum of US$75million to the BPE on March 20, 2013, and on 21 August 2013, TUPL made payment to the BPE of $225million, representing 75 percent of the $300 million bid price for the 1000 megawatt capacity Ughelli Power Plant. On November 1, 2013, the Federal Government of Nigeria officially handed over the plant to Transcorp Ughelli Power Limited.
- Transcorp in 2023 purchased 60% stake in the Abuja Electric Distribution Company (AEDC), thereby consolidating its hold in Nigeria's Power sector. The move was made by a consortium, of which was led by Transcorp Power Limited.

== Recent partnerships ==
On 30 January 2013, Transnational Corporation of Nigeria Plc and General Electric (GE) signed a framework agreement to collaborate to address the infrastructural needs of Nigeria, with emphasis on the power and transportation sectors specifically rail transportation. GE, a global leader in the design, manufacture, supply, installation and maintenance of technology and services for the power sector, confirmed its commitment to facilitate the generation of 10,000MW of additional power in Nigeria over the next decade in line with its existing agreement with the Federal Government of Nigeria, signed in March 2012.
