= United Bank for Africa =

Nigerian financial services conglomerate

Coordinates: 06°27′23″N 03°23′18″E

- Type: Public limited company
- Traded as: NGX: UBA
- Industry: Financial services Banking; Investment services
- Founded: 1949; 77 years ago
- Headquarters: Group Headquarters - UBA House, 57 Marina, Lagos, Lagos State, Nigeria
- Areas served: Africa, Europe, United States and Asia
- Key people: Emmanuel N. Nnorom; Group Chairman; Oliver Alawuba; Group Managing Director & Group CEO
- Products: Internet banking Mobile banking Wholesale Banking; Corporate banking Investment Banking; Consumer Banking; Collections; Treasury; Trade finance Savings Accounts; Current Accounts; Domiciliary Accounts; Non-Resident African Banking; Money Transfer; Debit Cards
- Revenue: ▲Beforetax:₦603 billion (US$$358.3 million) (Q3 2024)
- Total assets: ₦31.801 trillion (US$18.9 billion) (Q3 2024)
- Number of employees: 25,000+ (2024)
- Website: ubagroup.com

United Bank for Africa Plc (UBA) is a multinational pan-African financial services group headquartered in Lagos Island, Lagos and known as Africa's Global Bank. It has subsidiaries in 20 African countries and offices in London, Paris and New York. In December 2021, UBA received its banking license to commence operations in the UAE. It is listed as commercial bank by the Central Bank of Nigeria. The shares of stock of the group are listed on the Nigerian Stock Exchange, where they trade under the symbol: UBA. The Group Chairman of the bank is Emmanuel N. Nnorom and the GMD/CEO is Oliver Alawuba.

== Current executives ==
The table below shows the current Group Board of United Bank for Africa:

United Bank for Africa Group Board
S/N	Name of executive	Title/designation
1	Emmanuel N. Nnorom	Group Chairman
2	Oliver Alawuba	Group Managing Director/CEO
3	Chukwuma Nweke	Group Deputy Managing Director
4	Billi Odum	Group Company Secretary
5	Ugochukwu Nwagodoh	Executive Director, Finance and Risk Management
6	Aisha Hassan-Baba OON	Non-Executive Director
7	Caroline Anyanwu	Non-Executive Director
8	Erelu Angela Adebayo	Non-Executive Director
9	Henrietta Ugboh	Independent Non-Executive Director
10	Angela Aneke	Independent Non-Executive Director
11	Alhaji Abdulqadir J. Bello (FCA)	Independent Non-Executive Director

== Overview ==
United Bank For Africa is a large financial services group in Nigeria and on the African continent. As of September 2024, the group's financial assets were valued at ₦31.801 trillion (US$18.9 billion), with shareholders' equity of ₦3.585 trillion (US$2.0 billion). At that time the group employed in excess of 25,000 staff worldwide and its customer base exceeded 45 million accounts. The group maintains subsidiaries in Nigeria, Ghana, Benin, Ivory Coast, Burkina Faso, Guinea, Chad, Cameroon, Kenya, Gabon, Tanzania, Zambia, Uganda, Liberia, Sierra-Leone, Mozambique, Senegal, DR Congo, Congo Brazzaville, Mali, the United States of America, the United Kingdom, France, and United Arab Emirates. In November 2024, with worldwide staff numbering in excess of 25,000, the group opened full banking operations in France. At that time its global customer base exceeded 45 million accounts.

== History ==
The British and French Bank Limited (BFB) commenced business in Nigeria in 1948. BFB was a subsidiary of Banque nationale pour le commerce et l'industrie (BNCI) in Paris, which transformed its London branch into BFB as a separate subsidiary. Banque Nationale de Credit and two British investment firms, S.G. Warburg and Company and Robert Benson and Company, held shares in BFB.

Following Nigeria's independence from Britain, UBA was incorporated on 23 February 1961 to take over the business of BFB.

In 1970, UBA listed its shares on the Nigerian Stock Exchange and became the first Nigerian Bank to undertake an Initial Public Offering (IPO).

The present-day UBA was established on 1 August 2005 through the merger of Standard Trust Bank, which had been incorporated in 1990, and the original United Bank for Africa, one of Nigeria's largest and oldest banks. The transaction was one of the largest mergers to have been completed on the Nigerian Stock Exchange (NSE).

Following the merger, UBA further expanded its brand through acquiring Continental Trust Bank that same year. In 2006, UBA acquired Trade Bank, which was under liquidation by the Central Bank of Nigeria at the time.

UBA had another successful combined public offering rights issue in 2007 and made further acquisitions of three liquidated banks: City Express Bank, Metropolitan Bank, and African Express Bank. UBA also acquired Afrinvest UK, rebranding it UBA Capital, UK. The quest to build a strong domestic and African brand intensified in 2008 when UBA made further acquisitions of two liquidated banks: Gulf Bank and Liberty Bank.

UBA has a broad footprint across Africa and the world. It maintains subsidiaries in the following countries*, listed in the order of their commencement of banking operations:

Order of UBA's Commencement of Banking Operations by Country
Commencement of Banking Operations	Countries
1948	Nigeria
1984	United States
2005	Ghana
2007	Cameroon
2008	Burkina Faso, Chad, Côte d'Ivoire, Liberia, Senegal, Sierra Leone, Uganda
2009	Gabon, Kenya, Tanzania
2010	Guinea, Mozambique, Zambia
2011	Congo Brazzaville, Democratic Republic of the Congo
2012	Benin
2018	United Kingdom
2019	Mali
2022	Dubai

*UBA maintains a representative office in Paris, France.

== Subsidiaries ==
The table below illustrates the locations and Group shareholding in the subsidiary banks of the UBA Group Plc.

List of UBA Group Subsidiary Banks
Rank	Country	Subsidiary	Shareholding
1	United States	UBA America	100
2	United Kingdom	UBA United Kingdom Limited	100
3	France	UBA France S.A.	100
4	Nigeria	UBA Nigeria Limited	100
5	Benin	UBA Benin	84
6	Burkina Faso	UBA Burkina Faso	64
7	Cameroon	UBA Cameroon S.A.	100
8	Chad	UBA Chad S.A	89
9	Republic of the Congo	UBA Congo Brazzaville	100
10	Democratic Republic of the Congo	UBA Congo DRC	100
11	Ivory Coast	UBA Côte d'Ivoire	100
12	Gabon	UBA Gabon S.A.	100
14	Republic of Guinea	UBA Guinea Conakry S.A.	100
15	Kenya	UBA Kenya Limited	81
16	Liberia	UBA Liberia Limited	100
17	Mali	UBA Mali	100
18	Mozambique	UBA Mozambique	96
19	Senegal	UBA Senegal S.A.	86
20	Sierra Leone	UBA Sierra Leone Limited	100
21	Tanzania	UBA Tanzania	82
22	Uganda	UBA Uganda Limited	69
23	Zambia	UBA Zambia Limited	100
24	United Arab Emirates	United Bank for Africa plc (DIFC Branch)	100

== Awards ==
- Bank of the Year Africa in 2025 at The Bankers Awards by The Banker Magazine.
- Best SME bank in Africa 2024, by Global Finance Magazine.
- Winner, Best Regional Bank in West Africa for the year 2024 by the African Bank Awards.
- Bank of the Year Africa in 2023 at The Bankers Awards 2023, by The Banker Magazine – a publication of Financial Times of London.
- World's Best Frontier Markets Bank in 2024 by Global Finance.
