= List of companies listed on the Nigerian Stock Exchange =

List of companies traded on the Nigerian Exchange

This is a list of companies listed on the Nigerian Stock Exchange officially known as the Nigerian Exchange Group (NGX).

As of September 2024, the NGX had 151 listed companies across the Premium Board, Main Board, Growth Board and ASeM.

== Listed companies ==
Company	Ticker	Sector	Date listed	Date incorporated
Abbey Bank Plc	ABBEYBANK	Financial Services		1991-08-26
Academy Press Plc	ACADEMY	Services	1965-06-15	1964-07-28
Access Holdings Plc	ACCESSCORP	Financial Services	2022-03-28	2021-02-10
Africa Prudential Plc	AFRIPRUD	Financial Services	2013-11-01	2006-03-23
African Alliance Insurance Plc	AFRINSURE	Financial Services	2009-09-17	1960-05-06
Afromedia Plc	AFROMEDIA	Services	2009-05-18	1959-10-28
AIICO Insurance Plc	AIICO	Financial Services		1970-07-14
Airtel Africa Plc	AIRTELAFRI	ICT	2019-07-09	2018-07-12
Aluminium Extrusion Industries Plc	ALEX	Natural Resources	1987-12-29	1982-10-26
Aradel Holdings Plc	ARADEL	Oil and Gas	2024-10-14	1992-03-25
Associated Bus Company Plc	ABCTRANS	Services	2006-12-20	1993-04-05
Austin Laz & Company Plc	AUSTINLAZ	Industrial Goods		1982-07-13
AVA Infrastructure Fund	AVAIF	Construction/Real Estate	2014-09-15	2014-08-18
AXA Mansard Insurance Plc	MANSARD	Financial Services	2009-11-19	1989-06-23
Berger Paints Plc	BERGER	Industrial Goods		1959-09-01
Beta Glass Plc	BETAGLAS	Industrial Goods	1986-07-02	1974-06-02
Briclinks Africa Plc	BAPLC	ICT	2021-02-05	2015-07-30
BUA Cement Plc	BUACEMENT	Industrial Goods	2020-01-09	2014-05-30
BUA Foods Plc	BUAFOODS	Consumer Goods	2022-01-05	2005-04-13
C & I Leasing Plc	CILEASING	Services	1997-12-01	1990-12-28
Cadbury Nigeria Plc	CADBURY	Consumer Goods		1965-01-09
CAP Plc	CAP	Industrial Goods	1978-05-24	1965-09-21
Caverton Offshore Support Group Plc	CAVERTON	Services	2014-02-06	2008-06-02
Champion Breweries Plc	CHAMPION	Consumer Goods	1983-09-01	1974-07-31
Chams Holding Company Plc	CHAMS	ICT		1985-09-10
Chapel Hill Denham Nigeria Infrastructure Debt Fund	NIDF	Construction/Real Estate	2023-10-05	2017-02-07
Chellarams Plc	CHELLARAM	Conglomerates	1977-04-01	1947-08-13
Conoil Plc	CONOIL	Oil and Gas		1970-06-30
Consolidated Hallmark Holdings Plc	CONHALLPLC	Financial Services	2023-11-27	1991-08-02
Cornerstone Insurance Plc	CORNERST	Financial Services		1991-07-26
Coronation Infrastructure Fund	CNIF	Construction/Real Estate	2025-08-25	2025-04-09
Coronation Insurance Plc	WAPIC	Financial Services	1990-08-31	1958-03-14
Critical Minerals Financing Corp Plc	CMFC	Financial Services	2007-12-17	2002-06-05
Custodian Investment Plc	CUSTODIAN	Conglomerates		1991-08-22
Cutix Plc	CUTIX	Industrial Goods	1987-08-12	1982-11-04
CWG Plc	CWG	ICT		1991-09-26
DAAR Communications Plc	DAARCOMM	Services		1988-08-31
Dangote Cement Plc	DANGCEM	Industrial Goods	2010-10-26	1992-11-04
Dangote Sugar Refinery Plc	DANGSUGAR	Consumer Goods	2007-03-08	2005-01-04
eTranzact International Plc	ETRANZACT	ICT	2009-08-07	2003-05-07
Ecobank Transnational Incorporated	ETI	Financial Services	2006-09-11	1985-10-03
Ekocorp Plc	EKOCORP	Healthcare		1991-09-09
Ellah Lakes Plc	ELLAHLAKES	Agriculture		1980-07-14
Eterna Plc	ETERNA	Oil and Gas		1989-01-16
Eunisell Interlinked Plc	EUNISELL	Services	1993-11-15	1981-11-09
FCMB Group Plc	FCMB	Financial Services	2013-06-06	2012-11-09
Fidelity Bank Plc	FIDELITYBK	Financial Services	2005-05-05	1987-11-19
Fidson Healthcare Plc	FIDSON	Healthcare	2008-03-25	1995-03-08
First HoldCo Plc	FIRSTHOLDCO	Financial Services	2012-11-23	2012-08-10
Fortis Global Insurance Plc	FTGINSURE	Financial Services	2003-12-16	1981-07-23
FTN Cocoa Processors Plc	FTNCOCOA	Agriculture		1991-08-26
Geregu Power Plc	GEREGU	Utilities	2022-10-12	2006-11-02
Golden Guinea Breweries Plc	GOLDBREW	Consumer Goods		1962-09-19
Guaranty Trust Holding Company Plc	GTCO	Financial Services	2021-07-29	2020-08-28
Guinea Insurance Plc	GUINEAINS	Financial Services		1958-12-03
Guinness Nigeria Plc	GUINNESS	Consumer Goods	1965-01-12	1950-04-29
Haldane McCall Plc	HMCALL	Construction/Real Estate	2024-11-18	2012-03-19
HBM Nigeria Plc	HBMNG	Industrial Goods	1979-02-15	1959-03-09
Honeywell Flour Mills Plc	HONYFLOUR	Consumer Goods	2009-10-22	1985-07-01
Ikeja Hotel Plc	IKEJAHOTEL	Services	2007-09-13	1972-11-28
Industrial and Medical Gases Nigeria Plc	IMG	Natural Resources		1959-12-09
Infinity Trust Mortgage Bank Plc	INFINITY	Financial Services	2013-12-11	2002-11-29
International Breweries Plc	INTBREW	Consumer Goods		1971-12-22
International Energy Insurance Plc	INTENEGINS	Financial Services	2007-07-19	1969-03-17
Jaiz Bank Plc	JAIZBANK	Financial Services		2003-04-16
Japaul Gold & Ventures Plc	JAPAULGOLD	Oil and Gas	2005-08-04	1994-07-18
John Holt Plc	JOHNHOLT	Conglomerates		1961-09-01
Juli Plc	JULI	Services	1986-07-11	1972-09-21
Julius Berger Nigeria Plc	JBERGER	Construction/Real Estate		1970-02-18
LASACO Assurance Plc	LASACO	Financial Services		1979-12-20
Learn Africa Plc	LEARNAFRCA	Services		1961-10-12
Legend Internet Plc	LEGENDINT	ICT	2025-04-23	2021-08-12
Linkage Assurance Plc	LINKASSURE	Financial Services	2003-11-14	1991-04-01
Livestock Feeds Plc	LIVESTOCK	Agriculture	1978-04-03	1963-03-20
LivingTrust Mortgage Bank Plc	LIVINGTRUST	Financial Services		1999-03-22
May & Baker Nigeria Plc	MAYBAKER	Healthcare	1994-11-25	1944-04-04
McNichols Plc	MCNICHOLS	Consumer Goods	2009-12-21	2004-05-03
Mecure Industries Plc	MECURE	Healthcare	2023-11-07	2005-03-16
Meyer Plc	MEYER	Industrial Goods		1960-05-12
MOFI Real Estate Investment Fund	MOFIREIF	Construction/Real Estate	2025-11-10	2024-10-22
Morison Industries Plc	MORISON	Healthcare		1955-07-12
MTN Nigeria Communications Plc	MTNN	ICT	2019-05-16	2000-11-08
Multi-Trex Integrated Foods Plc	MULTITREX	Consumer Goods	2010-10-28	1999-10-18
Multiverse Mining and Exploration Plc	MULTIVERSE	Natural Resources	2008-04-07	2002-06-20
Mutual Benefits Assurance Plc	MBENEFIT	Financial Services	2002-05-28	1995-04-18
Northern Nigeria Flour Mills Plc	NNFM	Consumer Goods		1971-10-28
NASCON Allied Industries Plc	NASCON	Consumer Goods	1992-10-14	1973-05-11
NCR (Nigeria) Plc	NCR	ICT		1949-11-24
Neimeth International Pharmaceuticals Plc	NEIMETH	Healthcare	1979-09-25	1957-08-01
NEM Insurance Plc	NEM	Financial Services	1990-09-05	1970-03-18
Nestlé Nigeria Plc	NESTLE	Consumer Goods	1979-01-25	1969-09-25
Nigeria Real Estate Investment Trust Fund	NREIT	Construction/Real Estate	2026-01-15	2019-01-10
Nigerian Aviation Handling Company Plc	NAHCO	Services	2006-11-27	2005-04-08
Nigerian Breweries Plc	NB	Consumer Goods	1973-09-05	1946-11-16
Nigerian Enamelware Plc	ENAMELWA	Consumer Goods		1960-05-13
Nigerian Exchange Group	NGXGROUP	Financial Services	2021-10-15	1960-09-15
NPF Microfinance Bank Plc	NPFMCRFBK	Financial Services	2010-11-26	1993-05-27
Oando Plc	OANDO	Oil and Gas	1992-02-24	1969-08-25
Okomu Oil Palm Plc	OKOMUOIL	Agriculture	1997-09-11	1979-12-03
Omatek Ventures Plc	OMATEK	ICT		1998-07-16
PZ Cussons Nigeria Plc	PZ	Consumer Goods		1948-04-21
Pharma-Deko Plc	PHARMDEKO	Healthcare		1969-04-24
Premier Paints Plc	PREMPAINTS	Industrial Goods	1995-03-08	1982-08-26
Presco Plc	PRESCO	Agriculture	2002-10-10	1991-08-21
Prestige Assurance Plc	PRESTIGE	Financial Services	1990-12-10	1970-01-20
R.T. Briscoe Plc	RTBRISCOE	Services	1974-03-28	1957-03-05
Red Star Express Plc	REDSTAREX	Services	2007-12-06	1992-07-09
Regency Assurance Plc	REGALINS	Financial Services		1993-06-22
Ronchess Global Resources Plc	RONCHESS	Construction/Real Estate	2021-12-15	2008-09-08
Royal Exchange Plc	ROYALEX	Financial Services	1990-12-10	1921-02-28
SCOA Nigeria Plc	SCOA	Conglomerates		1969-06-20
Secure Electronic Technology Plc	NSLTECH	Services		2000-02-02
Seplat Energy Plc	SEPLAT	Oil and Gas		2009-06-17
SFS Real Estate Investment Trust	SFSREIT	Construction/Real Estate		
Skyway Aviation Handling Company Plc	SKYAVN	Services	2019-04-26	2009-04-16
Sovereign Trust Insurance Plc	SOVRENINS	Financial Services	2006-11-29	1980-02-05
Stanbic IBTC Holdings Plc	STANBIC	Financial Services	2012-11-20	2012-03-14
Sterling Financial Holdings Company Plc	STERLINGNG	Financial Services	2023-04-06	2021-10-13
SUNU Assurances Nigeria Plc	SUNUASSUR	Financial Services		1984-12-13
Tantalizers Plc	TANTALIZER	Services		1997-05-04
The Initiates Plc	TIP	Services	2016-10-25	1995-03-03
Thomas Wyatt Nigeria Plc	THOMASWY	Natural Resources	1978-10-26	1948-03-18
TotalEnergies Marketing Nigeria Plc	TOTAL	Oil and Gas		1956-01-06
Trans-Nationwide Express Plc	TRANSEXPR	Services	1992-09-07	1984-03-28
Transcorp Hotels Plc	TRANSCOHOT	Services	2015-01-15	1994-07-12
Transcorp Power Plc	TRANSPOWER	Utilities	2024-03-04	2012-09-24
Transnational Corporation Plc	TRANSCORP	Conglomerates		2004-11-16
Tripple Gee and Company Plc	TRIPPLEG	Industrial Goods		1980-04-14
UACN Plc	UACN	Conglomerates		1931-04-22
UH Real Estate Investment Trust	UHOMREIT	Construction/Real Estate	2008-02-05	2009-02-03
Unilever Nigeria Plc	UNILEVER	Consumer Goods	1973-04-01	1923-11-04
Union Dicon Salt Plc	UNIONDICON	Consumer Goods	1993-09-23	1991-11-12
United Bank for Africa Plc	UBA	Financial Services	1970-03-31	1961-02-23
United Capital Plc	UCAP	Financial Services	2013-01-13	2002-03-14
Unity Bank Plc	UNITYBNK	Financial Services		1987-04-27
University Press Plc	UPL	Services	1978-08-14	1978-08-14
UPDC Plc	UPDC	Construction/Real Estate		1997-10-06
UPDC Real Estate Investment Trust	UPDCREIT	Construction/Real Estate	2008-02-26	2013-03-27
Veritas Kapital Assurance Plc	VERITASKAP	Financial Services		1973-08-08
VFD Group Plc	VFDGROUP	Investment	2023-10-06	2009-07-07
Vitafoam Nigeria Plc	VITAFOAM	Consumer Goods		1962-04-08
Wema Bank Plc	WEMABANK	Financial Services		1945-05-02
Zenith Bank Plc	ZENITHBANK	Financial Services	2004-10-21	1990-05-30
Zichis Agro Allied Industries Plc	ZICHIS	Agriculture	2026-01-20	2012-04-17

== Delisted companies ==
The following companies were previously listed on the Nigerian Stock Exchange / Nigerian Exchange but have since been delisted. Reasons include voluntary delisting, regulatory action by the NSE/NGX or other regulators (such as NAICOM or CBN), mergers and acquisitions, and nationalisation.

Company	Date delisted	Reason for delisting
11 Plc	2021-05-07	Voluntary
A.G. Leventis (Nigeria) Plc	2020-01-07	Voluntary
ABA Textile Mills Plc	2009	Regulatory: NSE
Aboseldehyde Laboratories Plc	2009	Regulatory: NSE
Abplast Plc	2012	Regulatory: NSE
Access Bank Plc	2022-03-28	Merged with Access Holdings Plc
Acen Insurance Plc	2008	Regulatory: NAICOM
Adswitch Plc	2016-05-18	Regulatory: NSE
Afprint Plc	2010	Regulatory: NSE
Afribank Plc	2011	Nationalised: CBN
African Paints (Nigeria) Plc	2018-04-06	Regulatory: NSE
Afrik Pharmaceuticals Plc	2018-04-06	Regulatory: NSE
Afroil Plc	2014-11-24	Regulatory
Albarka Airline Plc	2011	Regulatory: NSE
Alumaco Plc	2016-05-18	Regulatory: NSE
Amicable Insurance Plc	2008	Regulatory: NAICOM
Anino International Plc	2020-10-12	Regulatory: NSE
Arbico Plc	2024-05-20	Voluntary
Ardova Petroleum Plc	2023-07-26	Voluntary
Asaba Textile Mills Plc	2009	Regulatory: NSE
Ashaka Cement Plc	2017-07-04	Merged with Lafarge Africa Plc
Aso Savings and Loans Plc	2025-01-16	Regulatory: NGX RegCo
Atlas Nigeria Plc	2008	Regulatory: NSE
Aviation Development Company Plc	2008	Regulatory: NSE
Avon Crown Caps and Containers Plc	2017-09-18	Voluntary
Baico Insurance Plc	2008	Regulatory: NAICOM
Bank Phb Plc	2011	Nationalised: CBN
Bcn Plc	2009	Regulatory: NSE
Beco Petroleum Products Plc	2017-05-02	Regulatory: NSE
Beverages (Wa) Nigeria Plc	2008	Regulatory: NSE
Bhn Plc	2007	Regulatory
Big Treat Plc	2014-11-24	Regulatory
Capital Hotels Plc	2023-11-03	Voluntary
Cement Company of Northern Nigeria Plc	2020-01-09	Merged with BUA Cement Plc (formerly OBU Cement Company Plc)
Ceramics Manufacturing Company Plc	2008	Regulatory: NSE
Cfao Nigeria Plc	2007	Voluntary
Christlieb Plc	2009	Regulatory: NSE
Confidence Insurance Plc	2012	Licence Withdrawn
Consolidated Hallmark Insurance Plc	2023-11-27	Changed structure to a holding company - Consolidated Hallmark Holdings Plc
Continental Reinsurance Plc	2020-01-17	Voluntary
Costain (W.A) Plc	2016-11-22	Regulatory: NSE
Courtville Business Solution Plc	2023-11-10	Voluntary
Crusader Insurance Nigeria Plc	2013-05-13	Merged with Custodian & Allied Insurance Plc
Daily Times of Nigeria Plc	2011	Regulatory: NSE
Dangote Flour Mills Plc	2019-11-18	Voluntary
Diamond Bank Plc	2019-04-01	Merged with Access Bank Plc
Dn Tyre and Rubber Plc	2026-04-08	Regulatory: NGX RegCo
Dumez Nigeria Plc	2002	Regulatory: NSE
Ecobank Nigeria Plc	2011	Absorbed by ETI: Now Ecobank Nigeria Ltd
Enpee Plc	2008	Voluntary
Epic Dynamic Plc	2009	Regulatory: NSE
Evans Medical Plc	2021-06-14	Regulatory: NGX
Famad Plc	2009	Regulatory: NSE
Ferdinand Oil Mills Plc	2009	Regulatory: NSE
Finbank Plc	2011	Merged with FCMB Plc
First Aluminium Nigeria Plc	2019-07-30	Voluntary
First Capital Investment & Trust Plc	2011	Regulatory: NSE
Flexible Packaging Plc	2011	Regulatory: NSE
Flour Mills of Nigeria Plc	2024-12-27	Voluntary
Footwear Manufacturing Plc	2009	Regulatory: NSE
Foremost Dairies Plc	2011	Regulatory: NSE
Fortis Microfinance Bank Plc	2019-08-20	Regulatory: NSE
G. Cappa Plc	2016-05-18	Regulatory: NSE
Glaxosmithkline Consumer Nigeria Plc	2024-02-07	Voluntary
Global Spectrum Energy Services Plc	2023-07-11	Voluntary
Goldlink Insurance Plc	2025-04-07	Regulatory: NGX RegCo
Great Nigeria Insurance Plc	2019-01-22	Voluntary
Greif Nigeria Plc	2026-04-08	Regulatory: NGX RegCo
Grommac Industries Plc	2008	Regulatory: NSE
Hallmark Paper Product Plc	2012	Regulatory: NSE
Ihs Nigeria Plc	2015-05-01	Voluntary
Impresit Bakolori Plc	2002	Voluntary
Incar Plc	2010	Voluntary
Intercontinental Bank Plc	2011	Merged with Access Bank Plc
Intra Motors Nig. Plc	2008	Regulatory: NSE
Investment & Allied Insurance Plc	2016-05-18	Regulatory: NSE
Ipwa Plc	2016-05-18	Regulatory: NSE
Jos International Breweries Plc	2016-05-18	Regulatory: NSE
Krabo Nigeria Plc	2011	Regulatory: NSE
Lennards (Nigeria) Plc	2016-11-22	Regulatory: NSE
Liz-Olofin & Company Plc	2009	Regulatory: NSE
Maureen Lab. Plc	2008	Regulatory: NSE
Medview Airline Plc	2025-04-07	Regulatory: NGX RegCo
Mnet/Supersport	2015-04-01	Regulatory
Mrs Oil Nigeria Plc	2025-08-01	Voluntary
Mtech Communications Plc	2017-05-02	Regulatory: NSE
Mti Plc	2017-05-02	Regulatory: NSE
Nampak Plc	2011	Voluntary
Navitus Energy Plc	2016-11-22	Regulatory: NSE
Newpak Plc	2011	Regulatory: NSE
Newrest Asl Nigeria Plc	2019-05-13	Voluntary
Niger Insurance Plc	2024-06-17	Regulatory: NGX RegCo
Nigercem Plc	2011	Regulatory: NSE
Nigeria Wire & Cable Plc	2015-07-09	Regulatory: NSE
Nigeria-German Chemicals Plc	2021-06-14	Regulatory: NGX
Nigerian Bag Manufacturing Company Plc	2013-04-11	Merged with Flour Mills Nigeria Plc
Nigerian Bottling Company Plc	2011	Voluntary
Nigerian Lamps Plc	2008	Regulatory: NSE
Nigerian Ropes Plc	2016-11-22	Regulatory: NSE
Nigerian Sewing Machine Manufacturing Plc	2015-07-09	Regulatory: NSE
Nigerian Textile Mills Plc	2008	Voluntary
Nigerian Wire Industries Plc	2013-06-03	Regulatory: NSE
Nigerian Yeast & Alcohol Manufacturing Plc	2008	Regulatory: NSE
Notore Chemical Industries Plc	2025-07-08	Voluntary
Oasis Insurance Plc	2014-12-31	Acquired by FBN Life Insurance
Oceanic Bank Plc	2011	Merged with ETI
Okitipupa Oil Palm Plc	2011	Regulatory: NSE
Oluwa Glass Company Plc	2009	Regulatory: NSE
Onwuka Hi-Tek. Plc	2008	Regulatory: NSE
P.S Mandrides & Company Plc	2016-11-22	Regulatory: NSE
Paints and Coatings Manufacturers Nigeria Plc	2018-08-22	Voluntary
Pinnacle Point Group	2014-11-24	Regulatory
Poly Products Plc	2005-07-14	Voluntary
Portland Paints & Products Nigeria Plc	2021-09-17	Merged with Chemical & Allied Products Plc
Premier Breweries Plc	2016-11-22	Regulatory: NSE
Rak Unity Petroleum Plc	2024-06-17	Regulatory: NGX RegCo
Resort Savings and Loans Plc	2024-06-17	Regulatory: NGX RegCo
Rietzcot Nigeria Plc	2008	Regulatory: NSE
Roads Nigeria Plc	2021-06-14	Regulatory: NGX
Rokanna Plc	2016-05-18	Regulatory: NSE
Security Assurance Plc	2008	Regulatory: NAICOM
Seven-Up Bottling Company Plc	2018-03-05	Voluntary
Skye Bank Plc	2019-08-20	Regulatory: NSE
Spring Bank Plc	2011	Nationalised: CBN
Staco Insurance Plc	2026	Regulatory: NAICOM
Starcomms Plc	2014-11-24	Regulatory
Stockvis Plc	2015-07-09	Regulatory: NSE
Studio Press Nigeria Plc	2022-01-07	Voluntary
Sun Insurance Plc	2008	Regulatory: NAICOM
Tate Industries Plc	2008	Regulatory: NSE
Tourist Company of Nigeria Plc	2025-01-31	Regulatory: NGX RegCo
Tropical Petroleum Plc	2011	Regulatory: NSE
Udeofsin Garment Plc	2012	Regulatory: NSE
Unic Diversified Holdings Plc	2021-06-14	Regulatory: NGX
Union Bank of Nigeria Plc	2023-11-27	Voluntary
Union Diagnostic & Clinical Services Plc	2022-01-07	Voluntary
Union Homes Savings and Loans Plc	2025-01-31	Regulatory: NGX RegCo
United Nigeria Textile Plc	2011	Voluntary
Universal Insurance Plc	2026	Regulatory: NAICOM
Universal Trust Bank Plc	2005	Merged with Union Bank of Nigeria Plc
Utc Plc	2017-05-02	Regulatory: NSE
Vono Products Nigeria Plc	2016-05-23	Merged with Vitafoam Nigeria Plc
West African Aluminium Plc	2013-06-03	Regulatory: NSE
West African Glass Industries Plc	2016-05-18	Regulatory: NSE
Wiggins Teape Nigeria Plc	2011	Regulatory: NSE

== See also ==
- Nigerian Exchange Group
- List of largest companies in Nigeria
- List of companies of Nigeria
