= List of companies of Nigeria =

Location of Nigeria

Nigeria is a federal republic in West Africa, bordering Benin in the west, Chad and Cameroon in the east, and Niger in the north. As of 2015 Nigeria has the world's 20th largest economy, worth more than $500 billion and $1 trillion in terms of nominal GDP and purchasing power parity respectively. It overtook South Africa to become Africa's largest economy in 2014. The 2013 debt-to-GDP ratio was 11 percent. Nigeria is considered to be an emerging market by the World Bank; it has been identified as a regional power on the African continent, a middle power in international affairs, and has also been identified as an emerging global power. Nigeria is a member of the MINT and Next Eleven groupings of countries, which are widely seen as the globe's next "BRIC-like" emerging economies. Nigeria is a founding member of the African Union and a member of many other international organizations, including the United Nations, the Commonwealth of Nations and OPEC.

== Notable firms ==
This list includes notable companies with primary headquarters located in the country. The industry and sector follow the Industry Classification Benchmark taxonomy. Organizations which have ceased operations are included and noted as defunct. Most of these companies (defunct or thriving) had or have their head offices in Lagos State of Nigeria. Lagos is unofficially recognized as the Commercial Capital of Nigeria.

Notable companies Status: P=Private, S=State; A=Active, D=Defunct
Name	Industry	Sector	Headquarters	Founded	Notes	Status	
Access Bank	Financials	Banks	Lagos	1989	Commercial bank	P	A
Aero Contractors	Consumer services	Airlines	Ikeja	1959	State charter airline	S	A
Arik Air	Consumer services	Airlines	Ikeja	2002	Airline	P	A
BUA Cement	Industrials	Building materials & fixtures	Lagos	2008	Cement, part of BUA Group	P	A
BUA Foods	Consumer goods	Food	Lagos	1988	Food industry, part of BUA Group	P	A
Cassava Republic Press	Consumer services	Publishing	Abuja	2006	Publisher	P	A
Central Bank of Nigeria	Financials	Banks	Abuja	1958	State-owned bank	S	A
Chanchangi Airlines	Consumer services	Airlines	Kaduna	1994	Airline	P	A
C&I Leasing Group PLC	Industrials	Marine transportation	Lekki	1990	Leasing	P	A
Chocolate City Records	Consumer services	Broadcasting & entertainment	Lagos	2005	Music label founded by Audu Maikori	P	A
Dana Air	Consumer services	Airlines	Ikeja	2008	Regional airline	P	A
Dangote Cement	Industrials	Building materials & fixtures	Lagos	1992	Cement, part of Dangote Group	P	A
Dangote Group	Conglomerates	–	Lagos	1981	Cement, food and beverage, oil and gas	P	A
Diamond Bank	Financials	Banks	Lagos	1990	Bank	P	A
Ensure	Financials	Full line insurance	Lagos	1993	Insurance	P	A
First City Monument Bank	Financials	Banks	Lagos	1982	Bank	P	A
Fidelity Bank Nigeria	Financials	Banks	Lagos	1988	Bank	P	A
First Bank of Nigeria	Financials	Banks	Lagos	1894	Bank	P	A
Guaranty Trust Bank	Financials	Banks	Lagos	1990	Bank	P	A
Industrial and General Insurance Company	Financials	Full line insurance	Lagos	1991	Insurance	P	A
Jiji.ng	Technology	Internet	Lagos	2014	Online marketplace	P	A
John Holt plc	Industrials	Diversified industrials	Lagos	1897	Industrials, power, logistics	P	A
Julius Berger	Industrials	Heavy construction	Abuja	1950	Construction and development	P	A
Jumia	Technology	Internet	Ikeja	2012	E-commerce platform	P	A
Kabo Air	Consumer services	Airlines	Kano	1980	Airline	P	A
Kakawa Discount House Limited	Financials	Investment services	Lagos	1995	Discount house	P	A
Keystone Bank Limited	Financials	Banks	Lagos	2011	Bank	P	A
Leadway	Financials	Full line insurance	Lagos	1970	Insurance	P	A
Mavin Records	Consumer services	Broadcasting & entertainment	Lagos	2012	Music label founded by Don Jazzy	P	A
Mikano International Limited	Industrials	Diversified industrials	Lagos	1993	Electrical power generation, real estate and construction	P	A
Nigerian National Petroleum Corporation (NNPC)	Oil & gas	Exploration & production	Abuja	1977	State-owned oil	S	A
Nigerian Postal Service	Industrials	Delivery services	Abuja	1987	Postal services	S	A
Nigerian Railway Corporation	Industrials	Railroads	Lagos	1898	National railways	S	A
Nigerian Television Authority	Consumer services	Broadcasting & entertainment	Abuja	1977	State-owned television	S	A
Nnamani Music Group	Consumer services	Distribution & publishing	Lagos	2023	Music company founded by Johnel Nnamani and Nnamani Grace Odi	P	A
Oando	Oil & gas	Exploration & production	Lagos	1956	Petrochemical and energy	P	A
Shell Nigeria	Oil & gas	Exploration & production	Abuja	1937	Part of Royal Dutch Shell (Netherlands)	P	A
Skye Bank	Financials	Banks	Lagos	2006	Has now been changed to Polaris Bank	P	A
Spring Bank	Financials	Banks	Lagos	2004	Bank, defunct 2011	P	D
Sterling Bank	Financials	Banks	Lagos	1960	Bank	P	A
The Tide	Consumer services	Publishing	Port Harcourt	1971	State-owned newspaper	S	A
Transmission Company of Nigeria	Utilities	Electricity transmission	Abuja	2005	Power	S	A
Transnational Corporation of Nigeria	Conglomerates	–	Lagos	2004	Food and beverage, power, hotels	P	A
Union Bank of Nigeria	Financials	Banks	Lagos	1917	Bank	P	A
United Africa Company of Nigeria	Conglomerates	–	Lagos	1931	Logistics, real estate, industrials	P	A
United Bank for Africa	Financials	Banks	Lagos	1949	Bank	P	A
Wema Bank	Financials	Banks	Lagos	1945	Bank	P	A
Wemy industries	Consumer	Personal goods	Lagos	1978	Personal hygiene products	P	A
Zenith Bank	Financials	Banks	Lagos	1990	Commercial bank	P	A

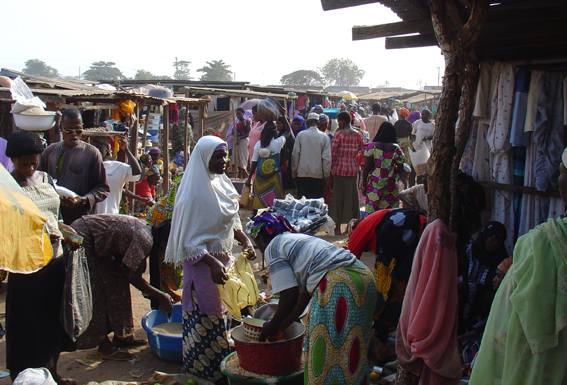
Market in Kuje.

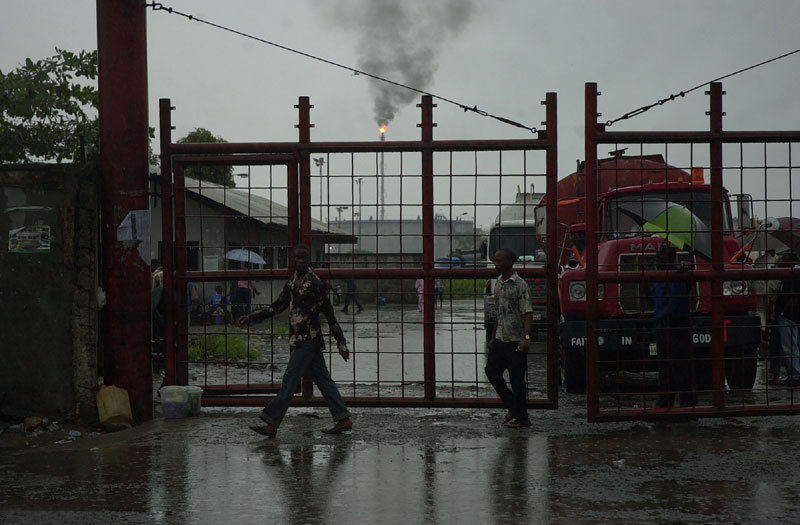
Port Harcourt oil refinery gates.

== See also ==
- List of largest companies in Nigeria
- Nigerian Exchange Group
- List of airlines of Nigeria
- List of legal entity types by country#Nigeria, for further information on the types of business entities in this country and their abbreviations
