= List of largest companies in Nigeria =

This list comprises the largest companies in Nigeria by revenue and market capitalization as of 2024, according to the ranking of the largest 500 companies in Africa by Jeune Afrique and African Business. Around 30 of the largest 500 companies in Africa by revenue are based in Nigeria.

== By revenue ==
Below are the 25 largest companies (excluding banks) by revenue in 2022 (mostly for fiscal year 2021).

Rank	Company	Industry	Revenue (US$ millions)	Profits (US$ millions)
1	Nigeria National Petroleum	Oil and gas	9,706	1,877
2	Nigeria Liquefied Natural Gas	Oil and gas	6,315	...
3	MTN Nigeria	Telecommunications	3,514	536
4	Dangote Cement	Cement	2,699	721
5	Nigerian Petroleum Development	Oil and gas	2,686	219
6	Flour Mills of Nigeria	Agroindustry	2,014	67
7	Airtel Nigeria	Telecommunications	1,503	343
8	Nigerian Breweries	Agroindustry	890	19
9	Jumia	Retail	837	...
10	Nestle Nigeria	Agroindustry	749	102
11	Julius Berger	Construction	631	3
12	Nigerian Bottling Company	Agroindustry	627	...
13	Lafarge Africa	Cement	602	97
14	Dangote Sugar Refinery	Agroindustry	559	78
15	BUA Cement	Cement	547	184
16	TotalEnergies Nigeria	Oil and gas	534	5
17	Seplat Petroleum Development	Oil and gas	498	−80
18	Ardova Plc	Oil and gas	474	5
19	11PLC	Oil and gas	428	16
20	International Breweries plc	Agroindustry	357	−32
21	Conoil	Oil and gas	307	...
22	Honeywell Flour Mill	Agroindustry	286	3
23	PZ Cussons Nigeria	Consumer goods	216	4
24	UAC of Nigeria	Conglomerate	213	11

== By market cap ==
Below are the 20 largest companies listed on the Nigerian Exchange (NGX) by market capitalisation, based on Kobo Terminal (formerly NGX Pulse) company data updated in May 2026. Nairametrics also published a May 2026 review of Nigeria’s most valuable listed companies, covering the April 2026 market-cap rankings.

Largest NGX-listed companies by market capitalisation (May 2026)
Rank	Company	Ticker	Industry	Market cap (₦ trillions)	Market cap (US$ millions, approx.)
1	Dangote Cement	DANGCEM	Industrial goods	19.91	14,221
2	BUA Foods	BUAFOODS	Consumer goods	17.41	12,436
3	MTN Nigeria	MTNN	Telecommunications / ICT	17.21	12,293
4	BUA Cement	BUACEMENT	Industrial goods	15.58	11,129
5	Airtel Africa	AIRTELAFRI	Telecommunications / ICT	12.49	8,921
6	Aradel Holdings	ARADEL	Oil and gas	7.98	5,700
7	Seplat Energy	SEPLAT	Oil and gas	6.89	4,921
8	Zenith Bank	ZENITHBANK	Financial services	5.42	3,871
9	Lafarge Africa	WAPCO	Industrial goods	5.40	3,857
10	Guaranty Trust Holding Company	GTCO	Financial services	5.33	3,807
11	First HoldCo	FIRSTHOLDCO	Financial services	3.20	2,286
12	Geregu Power	GEREGU	Utilities	2.83	2,021
13	Presco	PRESCO	Agriculture	2.68	1,914
14	Nigerian Breweries	NB	Consumer goods	2.66	1,900
15	Stanbic IBTC Holdings	STANBIC	Financial services	2.64	1,886
16	Nestlé Nigeria	NESTLE	Consumer goods	2.48	1,771
17	Ecobank Transnational Incorporated	ETI	Financial services	2.31	1,650
18	Transcorp Hotels	TRANSCOHOT	Services / hospitality	2.29	1,636
19	International Breweries	INTBREW	Consumer goods	2.19	1,564
20	Transcorp Power	TRANSPOWER	Utilities	2.05	1,464

== See also ==
- List of companies of Nigeria
- List of largest companies by revenue
- List of largest companies in Africa by revenue
