= Afegbua =

Afegbua is a surname. Notable people with the surname include:

- Abdulmalik Asekomhe Afegbua (1845–1954), Nigerian King
- Franca Afegbua (1943–2023), Nigerian beautician and politician
- Malik Afegbua, Nigerian filmmaker, artist and designer
