= Atsogwa =

Atsogwa or Itsogwa is the title of an Okpella man that is now a member of the council of Elders in the clan.
