= Ruth Osime =

Nigerian journalist

- Born: 7 February 1964 (age 62)
- Occupations: Journalist, Editor
- Parent: Chief Grace Osime (Mother)
- Relatives: Grace Osime, Omome Osime-Oloyede
- Website: ThisDay Style

Ruth Osime (born 7 February 1964) is a Nigerian journalist. She is the former editor of THISDAY Style Magazine, a fashion and style pullout magazine of THISDAY Newspaper.

== Personal life ==
Osime is the daughter of Chief Grace Osime and has two sisters, Grace Osime and Omome Osime-Oloyede.

== Career ==
Osime's career at THISDAY began with her as a project manager, then she became a writer and style editor in 2003, a position she held till April 2022. She also contributed to the Sunday publication of the newspaper with a column known as Truth by Ruth, before becoming the editor of THISDAY Style in 2005, when the magazine was launched. She is the co-producer of the annual ARISE Fashion Week and headed the panel of judges for the 2020 edition of the fashion show. In 2021, she sat as a judge for Lafarge Africa's annual National Literacy Competition for teachers and students.

== Recognition ==
Osime made it to the list of 25 Most Powerful Women in Nigerian journalism in 2020, coming 12th on the list compiled by Women in Journalism Africa.

== Award ==
Osime is a recipient of the 2021 Embracing All Tone of Women (E.A.T.O.W) Icons Award, in recognition of her contributions to the fashion and style industry.
