= Temi =

Temi may refer to:

== Places ==
- Témi, river in the Central African Republic
- Temi Tea Garden, in Sikkim, India
- Temi (hill), in the Northern Province, Sierra Leone
- Temi (river), in the Northern Province, Sierra Leone

== Other uses ==
- Temi language, Bantu language of Tanzania
- Temi (name), Yoruba-language given name
- Italian for:
  - Themis, the Greek goddess of divine law
  - Themis family, asteroid family
    - 24 Themis, asteroid within the asteroid family
  - Themis (hypothetical moon), hypothetical moon of Saturn

== See also ==
- Temi–Tarku Assembly constituency, in Sikkim
- Temi–Namphing Assembly constituency, in Sikkim
