= Tiger Foods Limited =

Nigerian food processing company

- Company type: Private
- Industry: Food processing
- Founded: 1996
- Founders: Donatus Ebubeogu; Celestine Ebubeogu
- Headquarters: Onitsha, Anambra State, Nigeria
- Area served: West Africa
- Key people: Donatus Ebubeogu (Founder and Group Managing Director); Celestine Ebubeogu (Co-founder; Managing Director, Tiger Beverages Limited)
- Products: Spices, seasonings, tomato paste blends, dehydrated vegetables, packaged beans, beverages
- Subsidiaries: Tiger Beverages Limited; Tiger Farms Limited
- Website: tigerfoods.com

Tiger Foods Limited is a Nigerian food processing company based in Onitsha, Anambra State. Established in 1996, the company produces and packages a range of food ingredients, including spices, seasoning mixes, tomato blends and dehydrated vegetables.

== History ==
Tiger Foods traces its origins to a family catering business in the 1980s and was incorporated in 1996.

In 2017, Don Ebubeogu was inaugurated as the 12th President of the Onitsha Chamber of Commerce, Industry, Mines and Agriculture (ONICCIMA).

Tiger Foods signed a memorandum with the Federal Institute of Industrial Research, Oshodi (FIIRO) as part of joint efforts to commercialize indigenous food technologies. The company has also taken part in value-chain initiatives with the Raw Materials Research and Development Council (RMRDC) on ginger processing and export promotion.

In 2022 Tiger Foods launched packaged, processed beans marketed as "Tiger Beans" in multiple pack sizes. The company also introduced dehydrated vegetable products under the Vegeta label at a public launch attended by state officials.

The company operates subsidiaries including Tiger Beverages Limited and Tiger Farms Limited.

== Products ==
Tiger Foods' product range includes curry powders and other spice blends. The company also produces seasoning mixes and condiments.

Tiger Foods sells dehydrated vegetables under the Vegeta label and packaged legumes such as Tiger Beans.

Tiger Beverages Limited, an affiliate of Tiger Foods, manufactures alcoholic and non-alcoholic beverage lines reported in the press and has entered commercial distribution agreements for those lines.

== Operations ==
The company distributes its products through retail and commercial channels in Nigeria and, according to press reports, the group has pursued broader distribution in neighbouring markets via commercial partnerships.

== Leadership ==
The company's founders, brothers Don Ebubeogu and Celestine Ebubeogu, hold senior executive roles within the Tiger Foods group.

== Awards and recognition ==
The company and its executives have been profiled in national media and included in industry award roundups and profile pieces in Nigerian newspapers and websites.

== See also ==
- List of companies of Nigeria
- Onitsha
