= Northern Edo masquerades =

Traditional Edo ceremony

The Northern Edo Masquerades are a traditional ceremony practiced by the Edo people of Nigeria.

== History ==
Masking traditions are a major part of the Edo groups of Nigeria, who trace their beginnings to the kingdom of Benin, their neighbors to the south. The politics and social structures of the Ibo groups tend to be more similar to their neighbors, which consist of the Idoma and Igala. Basic political units are formed from ritual ties. A council of elders within a number of Masquerade societies forms each small village’s government. Okpella is well known in and around Edo state as a cement town, which with ties to other African cities, towns, and villages under the direction of Glo-Mobile, one of Africa’s fastest growing networks that is helping to increase the technology of Africa to its network capacity to 10 million lines by the end of 2006, the village is still alive with African traditions and culture. Men and women of the Edo people belong to masquerade societies, with their primary belief to control anti-social forces (voodoo, witchcraft, demons, devils, etc.) and help to bring about a better, safer, and well-adjusted community or village.

== Artists ==
African art and African artists are regarded in a different sense of the word “artist” than what persons from other cultural backgrounds might conceive. An African artist is one who works in many different capacities, rather than just being a “starving artist," of Western lore. Most of these men and women work on farms as laborers and seasonal help. An African artist is highly regarded as a professional who may have become skilled in many mediums, such as wood, metal, leather, mud, wall painting, ceramics, and many other different aspects of creativity. Unlike their counterparts of the United States and Europe, researchers and collectors of art were not so much concerned with the artist’s name and identity, rather than to remember the artist as a well-known member of his or her village or town.

Many African artists throughout the years have established themselves with more of a regional reputation, attracting patrons of their craft, who wish to procure commissioned work. According to Lawrence Ajanaku, an African artist,

“No one learns from anyone else how to do it. It is something we are born with. It is the kind of knowledge that remains in the center of our being”.

The best-known of the Edo groups, the Okpella, use a wide, varying range of mask types, which, according to some African artists, may take up to a year to complete. The masks that are created by the artist convey many different types of rituals and ceremonies. One example of this is a brilliant, white-faced mask representing “dead mothers”, appearing during the annual Olimi festival, which is held at the end of the dry season, and is worn by dancing kinsmen. This festival, as others do, signifies social control and ancestral reverence, celebrating the transitions of age-grades.

The Otsa festival embraces women dancers in addition to the male, the traditional masquerade dancers. The women portray “mothers”, who sponsor new plays and as supporters who perform in concert in between masquerade plays. During the festival, the “mothers” come to the dance area with their masquerades to sprinkle chalk and water, which symbolizes peace and good luck. This festival annually celebrates the feast of Otsa to purify the land and reinforce community solidarity.

== Forms of Art ==
Many types of masks are used by the Northern Edo. Like most masks created in Africa, it represents the presence of a spirit. The intention behind an African mask is not to depict something realistic or naturalistic, as the African ideal aspires to capture the essence of the spirit represented. Therefore, abstraction and distortion are often seen. When a person wears the mask, that person takes on the entity that the mask represents, they become “one with the mask”, surrendering his body as not his own. The spirit of the mask takes up residence inside the person’s body while on earth. These masks are not considered in such lightheartedness, as a general costume might, they are held in high regard within the multiple communities of Africa. Masquerades are encompassing as a social gathering that encircles dancing and full-body fantastic costume wearing that also includes such masks. Together the people gathered at the event become a “band of spirits”; they are shown honor and reverence during their visitation here on Earth.

In addition to the masks and costumes worn during the masquerades, another vital component is the music and dance used to create the atmosphere that is conducive to capturing the essence of the spirit. The highly sophisticated dance helps expand more of the character being portrayed. Throughout the ceremony, the actions of the dancer may be something entirely different from what the person beneath would normally portray. Atmospheric circumstances are another essential element to the success of the masquerade. The right mood and setting add to and enhance the integrity of the performance, inviting the spirits to join. The audience’s participation from the sidelines only adds to the intensity of the masquerade - clapping, singing, and dancing, allowing themselves to feel the spirit’s presence. This strong relationship between human and spirits is the grand hallmark of the Northern Edo Masquerades.

== See also ==
- Masquerade ceremony
