= Ensure (disambiguation) =

Ensure is an American brand of dietary supplements.

Ensure may also refer to:

- Ensure Insurance, a former name of Allianz Nigeria Insurance

== See also ==
- Ensuring Positive Futures, UK
- Insure
