= Lafarge Africa =

Industrial company

Lafarge Africa Plc is an industrial company headquartered in Lagos, Nigeria, and listed on the Nigerian Stock Exchange. It is mostly controlled by the Holcim Group. Previously trading under the name of Lafarge Wapco Plc, the merger of Lafarge and Holcim and resulting consolidation of Lafarge's assets in Nigeria and South Africa resulted in the name change to Lafarge Africa.

In 2010, the firm formally launched a ready-mix division. In 2016, the firm's capacity was 14.1 million tonnes of cement, 5 million metric tonnes of aggregates and 3.5 million tonnes of ready-mix concrete.

The company manufactures and distributes products through its associated divisions that include WAPCO, United Cement Company of Nigeria, Calabar, Ashaka Cement, Lafarge South Africa and Atlas Cement Company. Company's brand products include Ashaka branded Portland limestone cement produced in Gombe State, Elephant and Superset cement produced by WAPCO, UniCem, Readymix Concrete, building aggregates, and Lafarge South African products such as artevia decorative concrete products, Buildcrete and DuraBuild cement, Dura-Pozz, Fast-Cast, Pozz-Fill, Powercrete Plus and SuperPozz.

== History ==
=== Lafarge WAPCO ===
West African Portland Cement company began operations in 1961 at Ewekoro, the firm was formally established in 1959 as a joint venture between Blue Circle, United Africa Company of Nigeria and the Western regional government in Nigeria. Blue Circle, previously known as Associated Portland Cement Manufacturers was Nigeria's largest supplier of cement. But not to be lose the market to local producers especially after a Nigerian Cement Company was commissioned at Nkalagu, Eastern Nigeria, Blue Circle joined a consortium that included the Western Nigeria government to establish a new kiln at Ewekoro. The consortium adopted a capital intensive dry process of cement production and produced Elephant brand of Portland cement. In 1978, a new plant was opened at Shagamu that was eventually producing one million tonnes in 2003. When productivity of the aged plant at Ewekoro began to decline, the firm built a new plant and adopted the wet process method of producing cement, that facility was commissioned in 2003 with a capacity to produce 1.32 million tonnes. By 2004, WAPCO had become the largest cement producer in Nigeria. In 2001, Lafarge of France acquired Blue Circle, including the latter's interest in WAPCO. Seven years later, the name became Lafarge Cement WAPCO plc. Lafarge increased production at WAPCO in 2011 with the commissioning of an additional 2.2 million metric tonnes plant at Lakatabu, Ogun State. Along with the new plant, the firm built a power plant to fire the new kilns.

=== Lafarge Africa ===
In 2014, Lafarge and Holcim merged and decided to consolidate some of their African businesses. A new entity Lafarge Africa was announced in June 2015, the company merged WAPCO of Nigeria's assets with the South African assets of Lafarge.

In 2017, Lafarge welded together more holdings in Nigeria when Atlas Cement, Port Harcourt and UNICEM of Calabar were merged with Lafarge Africa. The company sold its stake in Lafarge South Africa to Caricement in mid 2019.

== Associated companies ==
Affiliated companies of Lafarge Africa

- WAPCO Cement, distributors of Elephant cement
- UniCem
- Ashaka Cement
- Lafarge South Africa Pty
- Atlas Cement
- Lafarge Ready-Mix
- WAPCO
