= Celestine Ebubeogu =

Nigerian industrialist and business executive

- Occupations: Industrialist, entrepreneur
- Known for: Co-founding Tiger Foods Limited
- Title: Executive Director, Tiger Foods Limited
- Awards: Industrialist of the Year (The Sun Awards, 2023)
- Website: www.tigerfoods.com

Celestine Ebubeogu is a Nigerian industrialist, entrepreneur, and business executive. He is the co-founder and Executive Director of Tiger Foods Limited, a Nigerian food processing and manufacturing company based in Onitsha, Anambra State. In 2023, Ebubeogu received the Industrialist of the Year award at The Sun Awards for his contributions to Nigeria’s manufacturing sector.

== Early life and education ==
Celestine Ebubeogu was born in Onitsha, Anambra State, Nigeria. Details of his early life and formal education are not widely published.

== Career ==
Alongside his brother Don Ebubeogu, Celestine co-founded Tiger Foods Limited in 1997. The company began as a small-scale spice venture before expanding into large-scale food processing and packaging. Today, Tiger Foods produces a range of products, including curry powder, thyme, ginger, dried vegetables, and packaged beans under the Tiger and Vegeta brands.

Under Celestine’s leadership, the company has emphasized local sourcing, innovation, and quality control, enabling it to compete effectively with international brands in Nigeria’s spice and seasoning market. He has overseen several partnerships with public and private organizations, including collaborations with the Federal Ministry of Innovation, Science and Technology and the Anambra State Government to promote agricultural commercialization and export.

== Recognition ==
In 2023, Celestine Ebubeogu was named Industrialist of the Year at The Sun Awards, recognizing his leadership in advancing local manufacturing, innovation, and employment through Tiger Foods Limited. The recognition placed him among national business leaders celebrated alongside figures such as Tony Elumelu, Peter Obi, and Innocent Chukwuma during the event.

== Philanthropy ==
Through Tiger Foods and its affiliate ventures, Ebubeogu has supported youth empowerment and agricultural entrepreneurship initiatives in southeastern Nigeria, promoting local value chains and agribusiness training for farmers and young entrepreneurs.

== Personal life ==
Ebubeogu resides in Onitsha, Anambra State, Nigeria. Public details about his family and personal activities are limited.

== See also ==
- Don Ebubeogu
- Tiger Foods Limited
