= C&I Leasing Group PLC =

Nigerian maritime company

C&I Leasing Group PLC is a Nigerian public limited maritime company. Formed in 1990 as a private company, it was converted into a public company listed at the Nigerian stock exchange in 1997. It is divided into three business units: fleet management, outsourcing, and the operation of marine vessels.

C & I Fleet Management, which is managed along with the Hertz car rental franchise in Nigeria is supported by C & I leasing's own service centre and their Citracks Telematics solutions.

The C & I outsourcing unit specializes in human resource outsourcing, recruitment services, payroll services and business process outsourcing for blue chip organisations along with the SDS training centre which focuses on human capacity development for existing outsourcing clients and others.

The C & I Marine Unit is structured to provide a range of both onshore and offshore services to take advantage of the opportunities in the Nigerian Local Content laws. It charters and operates ships on a contractual basis from short to long term. It primarily charters offshore vessels and security patrol ships, operating in the Gulf of Guinea and Bonny river delta. The company employs about 4,500 people in six offices located in Port Harcourt, Benin, Enugu, Lagos, Abuja and Ghana. It also operates in Ghana through its subsidiary Leasafric Ghana Limited and in the United Arab Emirates through its subsidiary Epic International FZE.
