= Temi (name) =

- Gender: Male
- Language(s): Yoruba

Origin
- Word/name: Nigeria
- Meaning: Mine/belong to me

listen

Temi is a Yoruba given name. It means "mine". Other forms are Temilade, Temikorede, and Temiloju.

== Notable people with the surname include ==
- Temi Otedola, actress
- Temi Fagbenle, basketball player
- Temi Adeniji, music executive
- Temi Olajide, child sleep consultant
- Temi Lasisi, rugby union player
- Temi Popoola, financial service executive
- Temi Ejoor, military administrator
- Temi Oh, science fiction author
- Temi Wilkey, performer
- Temi Epstein, former child actress
- Temi Harriman, lawyer and politician
- Temi Mwale, British social entrepreneur
- Temi Dollface, singer
