= Masquerade ceremony =

Rite or cultural event, especially in the Caribbean and Africa

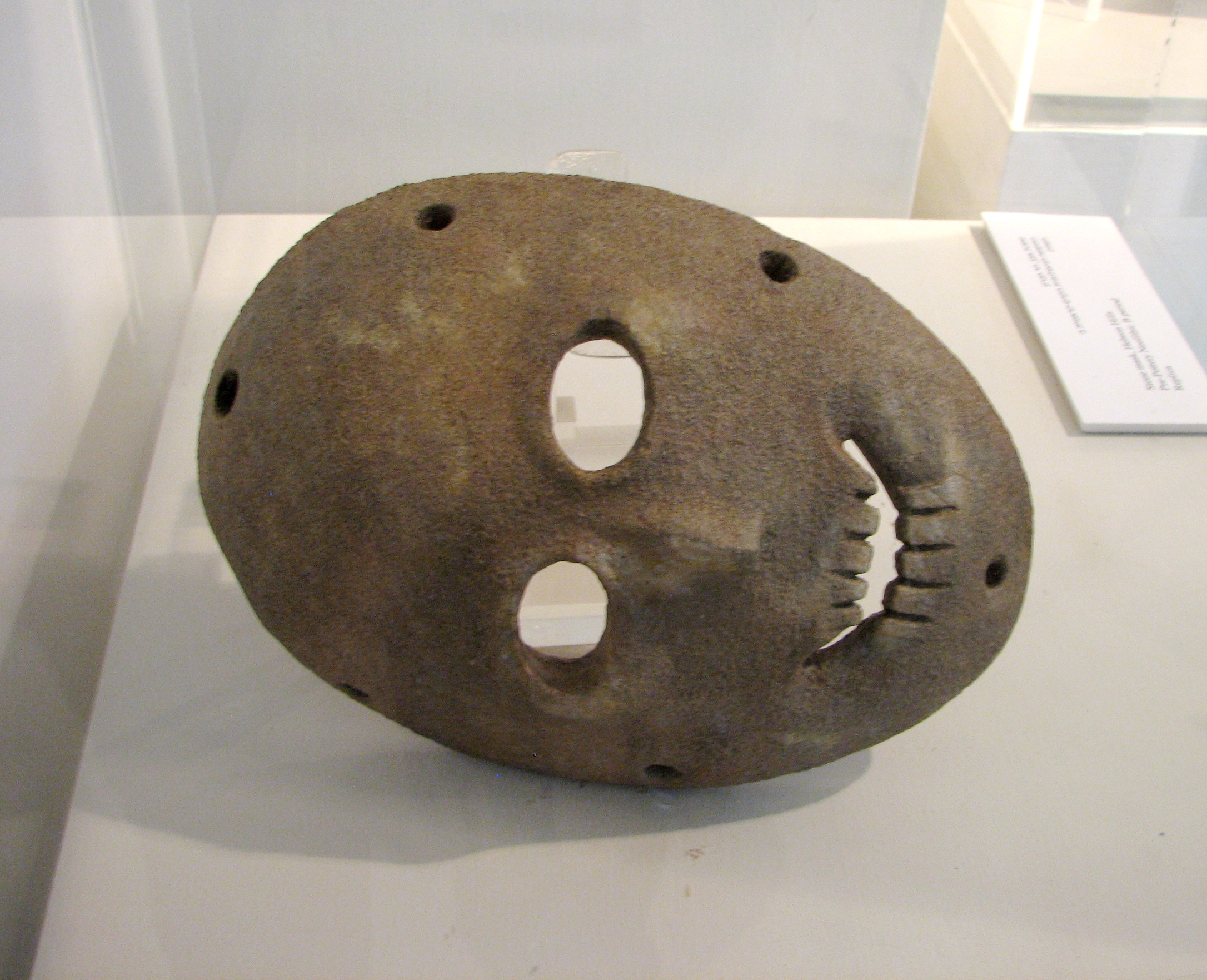
Replica of Neolithic mask.

A masquerade ceremony (or masked rite, festival, procession or dance) is a cultural or religious event involving the wearing of masks. The practice has been seen throughout history from the prehistoric era to present day. These events are deeply connected in the spiritual and social lives of people. These performances can have variety of themes, music, costumes and rituals. Their meanings can range from anything including life, death, and fertility. For example, in the Dogon religion, the traditional beliefs of the Dogon people of Mali, incorporates several mask dances, including the Sigi festival. The Sigi festival has also entered the Guinness Book of Records as the "Longest religious ceremony".

Among other examples are West African and African diaspora masquerades such as Egungun masquerades, Eyo masquerades, Northern Edo masquerades, the Omabe festival of Nsukka, the Akatakpa festival of Obollo-Afor, Caribbean Carnival (which is called "Mas"), Jonkonnu, and Mardi Gras Indians.

== History ==
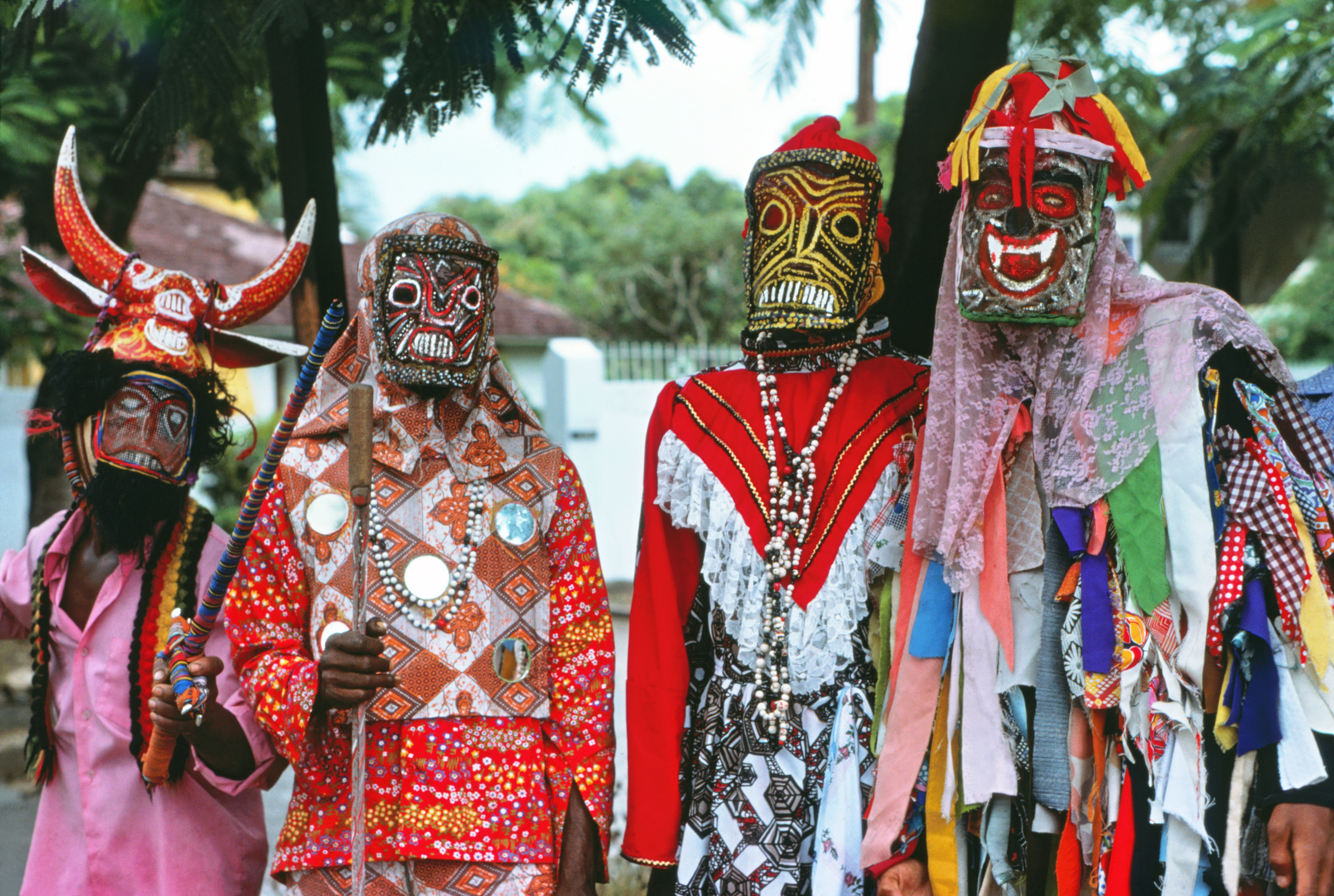
John Canoe Dancers Jamaica 1975 December

There has been evidence of masks linked to rituals since the Neolithic era. Some of the earliest masks are from the Southern Levantine dated to the mid-ninth and eighth millennia BC. These masks were located amongst various artifacts linked to ancient ceremonies. Items found include modeled skulls, gypsum, beads of wood, textiles, flint, basketry, bone, anthropomorphic, and zoomorphic figurines. Figurines also included miniature stone masks that represent what masks, made of organic materials, possibly resembled. Most masks from that era were made of less durable materials like wood, fibers, textiles, and feathers. Because of this, they were lost to time. Masks made of longer lasting material are rare leaving mostly these miscellaneous articles. Archaeologists concur with the use of masks in religious ceremonies but because of their rarity, they are unable to study masks further to uphold their preservation. Archaeologists have also recovered cave marking depictions that show cranes with human legs but other birds anatomically correct. Experts have linked these depictions to prehistoric masked ceremonies.

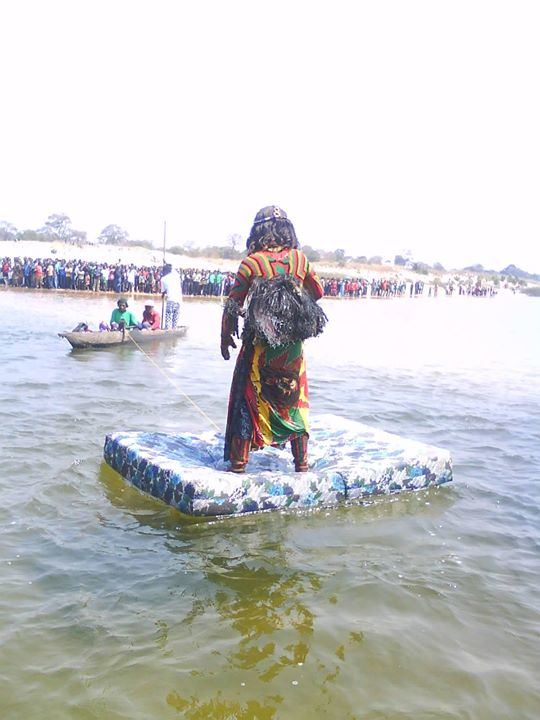
Makishi Dancer

During the era of enslavement in the Americas, free and enslaved Black people fused African religions with carnivals to continue practicing their culture under the Code Noir. The Code Noir in French colonies forbid all non-Catholic religions and required free and enslaved people to convert to Catholicism. As an act of resistance and to outsmart their enslavers, Africans syncretized their masking culture with European parading traditions.

Ritual masquerades are primarily known for and understood to be within indigenous African religious context and to uphold specific protocol that is unchanging and very strict. In different cultures the men masqueraders are known for playing integral and vital parts of society in generating perpetual wealth. In Salu Mpasu, men would perform certain deeds and paid expensive fees to the me already performing in the masquerades. These masquerades would happen in a territory marked out by white flour and they would perform within the restricted area, creating minimal interaction with the crowd, as they watch from they other side of the line. without crossing it.

== Choreography ==
Masquerade choreography is an important part of the ritual, performance and storytelling. With dance being Arica's most popular form of recreation, the choreography movements are designed to express identity, spirit, or of the masquerader, often blending with rhythm, symbolism, and tradition into a strong visual expression. The dancers play important roles in many spiritual and communal ceremonies, with their performances deeply tied to symbolic roles. In many cultures, masked performers represent divine beings, nature spirits, or revered ancestors. Others take on the task of calming spiritual forces through movement, while some entertain crowds during festivals and public events.

A raffia-costumed masquerade at Lagos Igbo Hangout 3.0 in Festac, Lagos, Nigeria, on 21 June 2026.

In West African masquerade ceremonies, choreography is deeply influenced by gender divisions, with masked dancing traditionally performed by men due to spiritual, cultural, and ritual significance. These male dancers often belong to secret societies and embody ancestral spirits, deities, or natural forces through physically demanding, rapid, or even forceful symbolically telling movements. Women dancers are to play vital roles by singing, and guiding the ceremony's rhythm, especially in inspiration or initiation rituals. These masquerades uses rhythm and movement to push a narrative to help retell stories that are impactful to their specific culture. In areas like Guinea and surrounding places the Sòmonò masquerades use puppet characters to help push a story and remind the communities of the importance of the Niger River.

== In religion ==
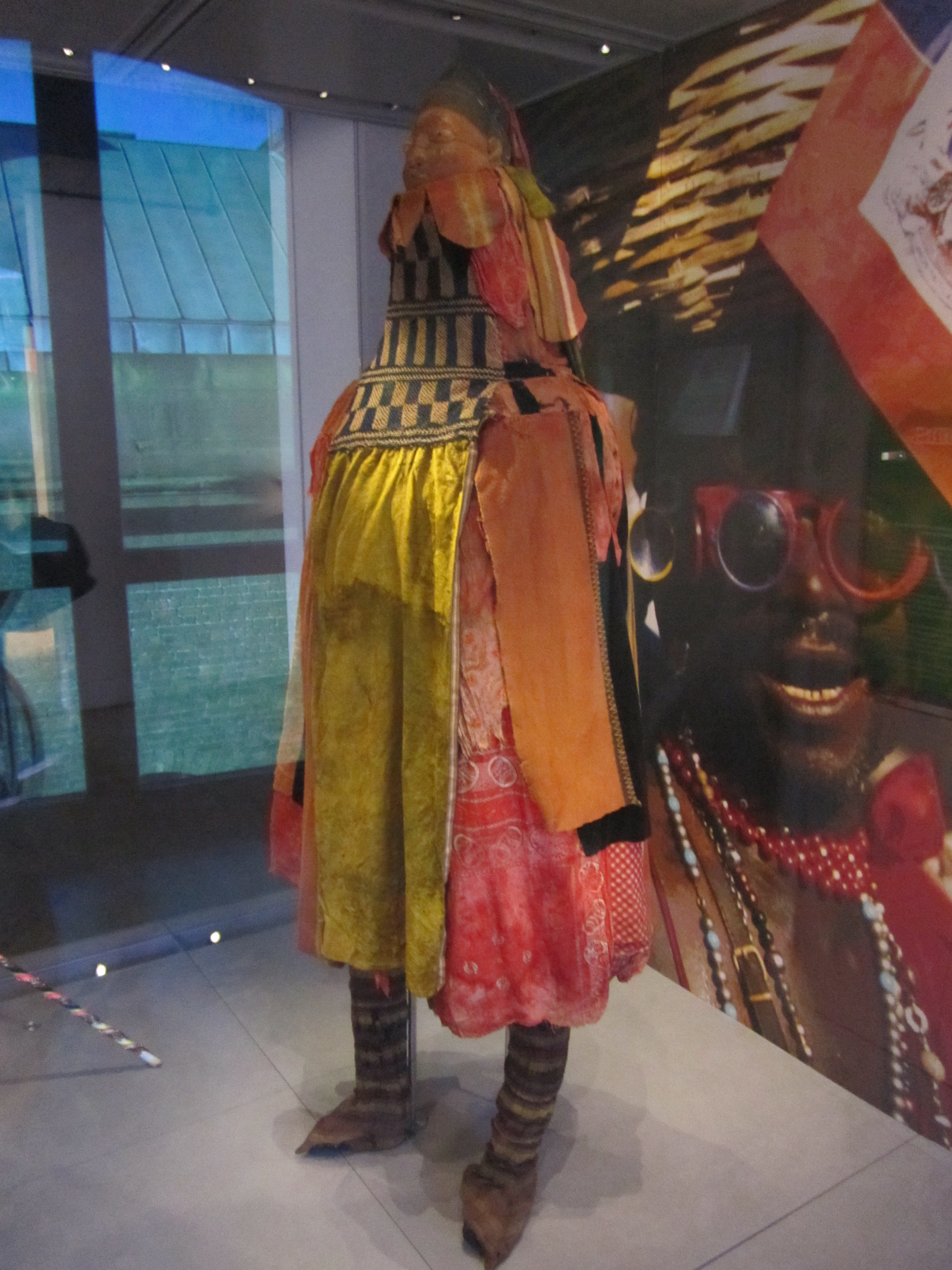
Gélédé costume

Multiple cultures and religions throughout history have used masks as an important staple of their ceremonies or rites. The Dogon believe their masks are the connection from this world and the celestial. They believe the masks, through dance, link them to the divine. In their religion, living beings such as trees, plants, and creatures are occupied by spirits. These spirits are held in high regard and the Dogon offer blood sacrifices to prevent reprisal when these materials are used to make masks. The Dogon have over 70 masks representing animals and mythical beings.

The Yoruba are another African group from southwestern Nigeria. They celebrate Gélédé, a masquerade ceremony commemorating the importance of women. To the Yoruba, Gélédé is meant to honor their ancestors, earthly spirits, and their earth goddess.

In Slavic cultures, Svyatki was celebrated. An old pagan holiday with christian roots where masks were used to hide the wearers' identity. Svyatki is also a holiday intended to worship a sun deity and the Virgin Mary. It was typical for participants of this holiday to "Christmas dress." Christmas dressing involved cross-dressing, turning clothes inside out, or dressing as a monster or animal. The participant would soil their clothes with dirt, paint, or blood, as a representation of the evil of the world. The masks and costumes served as a symbology of sinning or sinners. They would then be baptized, cleaning themselves in reservoirs would symbolically wash away their portrayed characters sins.

These cultures use masks to further connect themselves with the traditions of their ancestors and serve symbolically in many aspects of their religions. Among the Eastern Pende, preparing and holding a masquerade required specific tasks such as renewal of alters, cleaning of community fires, and more. In other cultures masquerades are held popularly during funerals to celebrate and honor the deceased. During this time the masquerade can be from 2-7 days long, but not a person can remain inside. Instead it is shared with others by expressing gratitude and joy.

== Masks ==
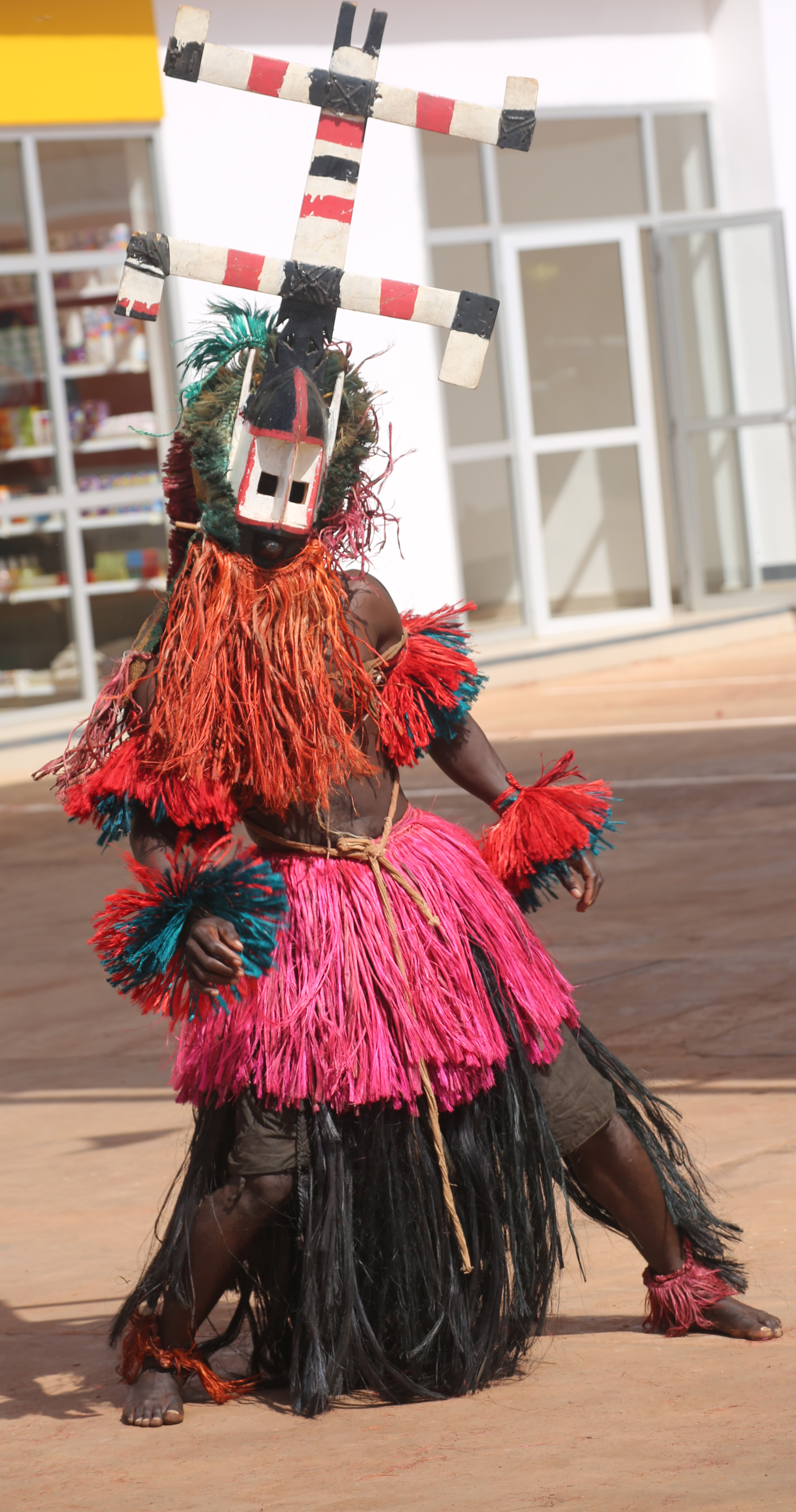
"Kanaga" mask. Double cross depicting hands of god.

Masks used in masquerade ceremonies vary from culture, ceremony, and point in history.

A masquerade performer wearing an elaborate mask and costume at Lagos Igbo Hangout 3.0 in Festac, Lagos, Nigeria, on 21 June 2026.

Some of the oldest masks found in the Neolithic period are much older than the invention of writing. Pictographs traced to be older than twenty-five thousand years old show humans wearing masks of animals but, like many other masks from this era, these masks were believed to be made of bio-gradable material and unable to stand the test of time. Masks for current ceremonies include those of the Dogon Tribe. The Dogon Masks are made of wood. They depict antelopes, hunters, ostrich, hornbills, and some carry a "double cross" representing the hands of god. In relation to masquerade ceremonies, the mask can be seen as a vessel for spirits and ancestors. When worn, it becomes a link between the human and spirit worlds.

== Contemporary traditions ==
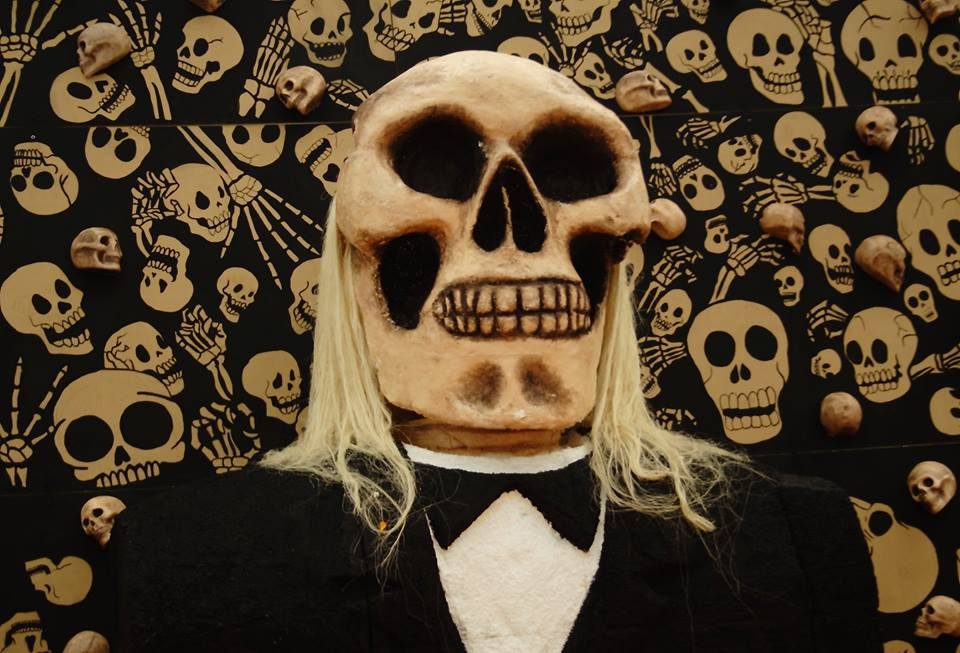
Day of the Dead skull mask

As ancient of a tradition that masquerading is, it can still be seen today in nearly every culture. Hiding one's identity behind a mask has transcended time. Today, Day of the Dead is celebrated in Mexico. It's a celebration of remembrance of the living's departed loved ones. It's celebrated with close family, involving the decorating of their tombs with photos, flowers, and offerings such as food, liquor, and cigars. People dress with make-up, costumes, and animal masks used to symbolize the nine levels of the underworld, known in Mexico as Mictlan. South of Mexico, in Brazil, Carnival is celebrated in the beginning of March. The celebration of Carnival allows the people of Brazil to freely express themselves through all kinds of costumes, representing anything from their aspirations to fantasies. Masking traditions have been observed in New Orleans in African-American neighborhoods practiced by Mardi Gras Indians (also called Black masking Indians) during carnival season.

The traditions of masquerades in Africa developed into a colorful way of expressing cultural identity. The Caribbean and African diaspora carnival, especially the Junkanoo, exemplifies how the performers combine historical symbols with modern ones, paying homage to their ancestors while also celebrating their modern identities. Masquerades are a bit fixed and developed according to the participant's situation. The Ouidah Voodoo Festival and Egungun provide a platform for personal expression.

=== Contemporary masquerade artists ===
==== Hervé Youmbi ====
Hervé Youmbi is a contemporary artist working directly with masquerade traditions. Hervé works in Douala, Cameroon. He installed his works at the Institute de Formation Artisique de Mbalmayo, Cameroon, from 1993 to 1996. In 1998, he was known as one of the founding members of the art group Cercle Kapsiki. He produced his first videos from 2010 to 2011, and, as a result, his artistic process began to focus more on multimedia installations and work involving urban public spaces.

== See also ==
- Mask
- Masquerade ball (a European dance)
- Maskarada (carnival of Soule)
- Traditional African masks
- Hervé Youmbi
