= Franca Afegbua =

Nigerian beautician and politician (1943–2023)

Senator for Bendel North
- In office October 1983 – 31 December 1983

Personal details
- Born: 20 October 1943 Okpella, Edo State, Nigeria
- Died: 12 March 2023 (aged 79)
- Party: National Party of Nigeria
- Profession: Politician; beautician

Franca Afegbua (20 October 1943 – 12 March 2023) was a Nigerian beautician and politician who represented Bendel North in the Nigerian Senate in 1983. Elected as a National Party of Nigeria (NPN) senator, she was the first elected woman senator in Nigeria.

Her election marked a significant milestone in Nigeria's political history, breaking a major gender barrier in elective politics at the national level. Although her tenure lasted only a few months before the military coup of December 1983 dissolved the Second Republic, her victory remains an important landmark in the history of women's political participation in Nigeria.

== Early life and background ==
Afegbua was born in Okpella, Edo State in 1943 and completed her post-secondary education in Sofia, Bulgaria. Prior to the beginning of the second republic, she worked as a hairdresser in Lagos serving high-income clients. Afegbua had a close relationship with Joseph Tarka, who introduced her to his party, NPN. In 1983, when she announced her intention to make a challenge for a senatorial seat in Bendel, few felt that she could win.

== Career in beauty and business ==
Before entering politics, Afegbua worked as a professional hairdresser in Lagos, where she built a reputation serving high-profile clients. In 1977, she gained national attention after winning an international hairstyling competition. The recognition increased her popularity within her hometown and helped establish her public identity before entering politics.

== Political career ==
Afegbua entered politics through Joseph Tarka, who introduced her to the National Party of Nigeria (NPN). At the time, Nigerian politics was heavily male-dominated. In 1983, she contested for the Bendel North senatorial seat.

Her party was in opposition and the incumbent governor and senator were respected men in the community. But Afegbua, who had won an international hairstyling competition in 1977, strategized that wooing more women to vote could give her a victory. Her victory in the hairstyling competition had made her name popular within her Etsako community; she targeted women voters, and, as her campaign gained steam, it was too late to curb. She won a slim victory in the August election, defeating John Umolu. Her tenure ended later that year when a military coup dissolved democratic institutions and ended the Second Nigerian Republic.

== Later life ==
After leaving the Senate, Afegbua withdrew from national politics but remained respected in her community. She was occasionally mentioned in discussions about women’s political representation in Nigeria. Her 1983 victory continues to be referenced in studies of gender and political participation.

== Legacy and impact ==
Franca Afegbua's election to the Nigerian Senate in 1983 is widely regarded as a turning point in the participation of women in Nigerian politics. As the first woman elected to the Senate, her victory challenged long-standing gender barriers in elective office and demonstrated that women could successfully contest and win national elections.

Her political career has been cited in discussions on women's representation and leadership in Nigeria. Although her time in the Senate was cut short by the military coup that ended the Second Republic in December 1983, her election remains an important milestone in the country's democratic history and continues to inspire women seeking public office.

== Death and tribute ==
Franca Afegbua died on 12 March 2023 at the age of 79. News of her death was widely reported by Nigerian media, with political leaders, women's groups and public commentators paying tribute to her pioneering role in Nigerian politics.

Many tributes described Afegbua as a trailblazer whose election to the Senate in 1983 opened new opportunities for women seeking elective office in Nigeria. Her contribution to the advancement of women's political participation has continued to be recognised in historical accounts of Nigeria's democratic development.
