= Red Star Express =

Nigerian logistics company

- Traded as: NGX: REDSTAR
- Headquarters: Lagos State, Nigeria.
- Key people: Suleiman Barau (Chairman) Babura, Badamasi Auwalu (Group Managing Director)

Red Star Express is a Nigerian logistics company which includes local and international deliveries, freight forwarding, combined warehousing and haulage services, and document management, and e-commerce order fulfillment services. Red Star Express has three subsidiaries: Red Star Logistics Limited, Red Star Freight Limited and Red Star Support Services Limited.

== History ==
Red Star Express was incorporated in 1992. It became a licensee for FedEx in 1994. Red Star Express became a public company in July 2007 and its shares were listed on the Nigerian Stock Exchange November 14, 2007.

In July 2023, the International Finance Corporation and Nigerian Exchange Group awarded Red Star Express for their efforts towards gender equality in the logistics and aviation industry.
