= Staco Insurance Plc =

Nigerian insurance company

- Formerly: Standard Trust Assurance Plc
- Type: Public limited company
- Industry: Insurance
- Founded: 10 October 1991
- Headquarters: Ebute Metta, Lagos, Nigeria
- Key people: Nike Nihinlola (acting managing director)
- Products: Non-life insurance

Staco Insurance Plc is a Nigerian non-life insurance company based in Lagos. It was formerly known as Standard Trust Assurance Plc and was listed on the Nigerian Exchange until 2026. In August 2026 the National Insurance Commission (NAICOM) revoked its operating licence after it failed to meet new minimum capital requirements.

== History ==
The company was incorporated on 10 October 1991. It began operating in 1994 after it acquired and restructured Alpha Insurance Plc. In October 2006, during the industry recapitalisation ordered by NAICOM, Standard Trust Assurance merged with Summit Insurance Company Limited and took the name Staco Insurance Plc.

In July 2018 the Nigerian Stock Exchange suspended trading in Staco's shares, along with those of several other insurers, for failing to file financial statements on time. In the same month, the board dismissed Sakiru Oyefeso, who had led the company as chief executive since 1994, citing financial misappropriation, abuse of office and breaches of corporate governance. It recommended Bayo Fakorede to replace him.

Its audited accounts for 2018 were not released until about six years later, and showed a 158 per cent increase in loss after tax. Later, managing director Wale Banmore died in December 2025. In January 2026 the board appointed Nike Nihinlola as acting managing director.

== Licence revocation ==
The Nigerian Insurance Industry Reform Act 2025 raised the minimum capital for insurers. NAICOM guidelines issued in September 2025 gave companies 12 months to comply. Staco was one of six companies not on NAICOM's list of compliant firms. The others were Goldlink Insurance, NICON Insurance, Nigeria Reinsurance Corporation, Royal Exchange Prudential Life Assurance and Universal Insurance. Staco's licence was revoked with effect from 3 August 2026. Because the company no longer held a licence, Nigerian Exchange Limited removed its shares from the official list with effect from 21 September 2026.
