= NPF Microfinance Bank =

Nigerian microfinance bank

- Formerly: NPF Community Bank
- Company type: Public company
- Traded as: NGX: NPFMCRFBK
- Industry: Financial services
- Founded: May 19, 1993; 32 years ago
- Headquarters: Lagos, Nigeria
- Area served: Nigeria
- Products: Banking services, loans
- Owner: Nigeria Police Co-operative Society (62.6%)
- Website: npfmicrofinancebankplc.ng

NPF Microfinance Bank (formerly NPF Community Bank Ltd) is a Nigerian microfinance bank associated with the Nigeria Police Force. It provides retail banking and microcredit services to police personnel, related security institutions, and the general public.

The bank is licensed by the Central Bank of Nigeria (CBN) and insured by the Nigeria Deposit Insurance Corporation. Its shares trade on the Nigerian Stock Exchange under the ticker NPFMCRFBK.

== History ==
NPF Microfinance Bank traces its origins to the early 1990s as NPF Community Bank Ltd. It was incorporated on 19 May 1993, obtained a provisional community-bank licence from the CBN on 12 July 1993, and commenced business on 20 August 1993 at Obalende, Lagos.

Following the CBN’s microfinance policy, it received approval-in-principle as a microfinance bank in May 2007 and a final microfinance licence in December 2007. The bank converted to a public company and listed its shares on the Nigerian Stock Exchange on 1 December 2010.

== Operations ==
The bank offers savings, term deposits, consumer and MSME loans, and other allied services through branches located across police commands and major cities. Its stated primary constituency is serving and retired police personnel and other security services, while also banking the wider public. In 2018, it reported customer numbers around 380,000, roughly 70% of whom were from the police/paramilitary community.

The Nigeria Police Co-operative Society Limited is the controlling shareholder, with the NPF Welfare Insurance Scheme also holding a significant stake. NGX filings for the year ended 31 December 2024 show the Police Co-operative holding about 62.6% of issued shares and the Welfare Insurance Scheme about 15.6%. The company’s free-float compliance has periodically been addressed with the NGX through formal notices.

== See also ==
- Banking in Nigeria
- Nigeria Deposit Insurance Corporation
- Central Bank of Nigeria
