= Wemy industries =

Wemy Industries Limited
- Company type: Private Company
- Industry: FMCG
- Founded: 1978
- Headquarters: Alapere, Ketu Lagos State, Nigeria
- Key people: Ademola Odunaiya (Chairman); Paul Odunaiya (M.D); Oba Odunaiya (E.D)
- Number of employees: 201-400
- Website: www.wemydrbrowns.com

Wemy Industries is a Nigerian company that manufactures and distributes of hygiene products in the Fast-Moving Consumer Goods (FMCG) market in Nigeria. It was founded in 1978 by Pastor Ademola Odunaiya and his wife, the late Dr. (Mrs.) Aderonke Odunaiya. It launched operations in 1981, and is the first manufacturer of baby diapers in West Africa.

== Brand names ==
Wemy Industries has marketed sanitary pads and baby diapers using the brand name “Dr. Brown’s” since 1981, and has marketed some of its hygiene products using the brand name “Nightingale” since 2009.

== Category ==
As of 2014; the company has 37 SKUs. The product ranges are categorized into 3 different care lines according to the company’s handbook: Baby Care, Feminine Care, Adult Care.

== Overview ==
Traditionally in Nigeria and to some extent West Africa, the use of diapers/training pants are low due to the high rate of poverty and illiteracy; it is more so in the rural areas than the urban areas. Generally, clothes and cotton wool are still used by women who are not able to afford standard sanitary protection products, especially in rural areas.

One of the common complaints is that the prices of hygiene and sanitary products for women and babies are too high; such claims about prices are common in urban areas. In the area of incontinence, there is limited awareness about the availability of incontinence products, many incontinence patients can’t even afford specialized care or doctors’ advice, and some are oblivious to the availability of such products. This is no longer the norm- thanks to major awareness and education brought in by governmental parastatals and other popular manufacturers including Wemy Industries. Though usage is still relatively low, compared to developed countries

== History ==
- 1978 October 25, Wemy Industries Limited was incorporated as a Private Limited Liability (PLL) company to manufacture Dr. Brown’s brand of ladies' sanitary pads and children’s disposable nappies.
- 1981 The company commenced full production of its diapers and sanitary pads at its former site in Isolo, a small residential suburb of Lagos state. At the time, it was the sole domestic manufacturer of these products in Nigeria.
- 1983, the company added toilet rolls to its product portfolio. However, this product was discontinued as the company felt that it was not a commercially viable product at the time and decided to commit its efforts and resources to its more profitable product lines.
- 1984, due to the increasing scope of the company’s operations, Wemy Industries commissioned the building of a new factory in Ota Industrial Estate, Ogun State.
- 1990 as a result of the need to further expand, coupled with the desire to be located within the Lagos metropolis, Wemy Industries relocated the factory site to Alapere Ketu, where the company still resides today.
- 1994 rival companies launched their brands of hygiene products in the Nigerian market, and a lot of media buzz was garnered for the health and hygiene industry. This led Wemy Industries to change its strategy and ultimately diversify its product range.
- 2004 till present, Wemy Industries has consciously increased its product range in order to optimize its revenue streams and fend off increasing competition, introducing products such as baby wipes, panty liners, ultra‐thin pads, and underlay pads into the Nigerian market over a few years.
- 2009 Wemy Industries introduced the Nightingale brand as an alternative brand in the maternity care range of products.
- 2013 commissioned additional factories for baby wipes and under-lay towel pads.
