= BUA Foods =

Nigerian company

BUA Foods plc
- Type: Public
- Industry: Food industry
- Founded: 1988; 38 years ago
- Headquarters: Lagos, Nigeria
- Key people: Ayodele Musibau Abioye (CEO)
- Products: sugar, flour, pasta, rice and edible oils
- Revenue: 417.8 billion ₦ (2022)
- Website: buafoodsplc.com

BUA Foods plc is a Nigerian company based in Lagos. It is part of the BUA conglomerate. Its business activities include the production, processing and distribution of food products through its sugar, flour, pasta, rice and edible oils divisions. The sugar division includes the production, processing, refining and distribution of raw sugar and its by-products. The rice division has a rice mill with a capacity of over 200,000 tons per year. The edible oils division specializes in the conversion of crude palm oil into oil products, including palm oil, stearin and distilled fatty acids.

The company is listed on the Nigerian Stock Exchange and is part of the NSE index of the same name. With a market cap of 2.6 billion US$ in 2022, it is one of the most valuable companies in Nigeria.

== History ==
In 1988, BUA International Ltd. was founded to import iron and steel as well as rice. The own food production began after the takeover of Nigeria Oil Mills Ltd. with the edible oil business in 2000. Subsequently, BUA Sugar Refinery Ltd. was founded on 13 April 2005, for the refining of sugar. In 2007, BUA Flour Mills in Kano was established with a capacity of 500 tons per day. The rice division was founded in 2014 and the pasta division in 2019. In 2021, BUA Foods Limited was converted into a public limited company and the name was changed to BUA Foods plc. The IPO took place in the same year.

== See also ==
- BUA Cement
