= Temi Popoola =

Nigerian financial services executive and GMD/CEO of NGX Group

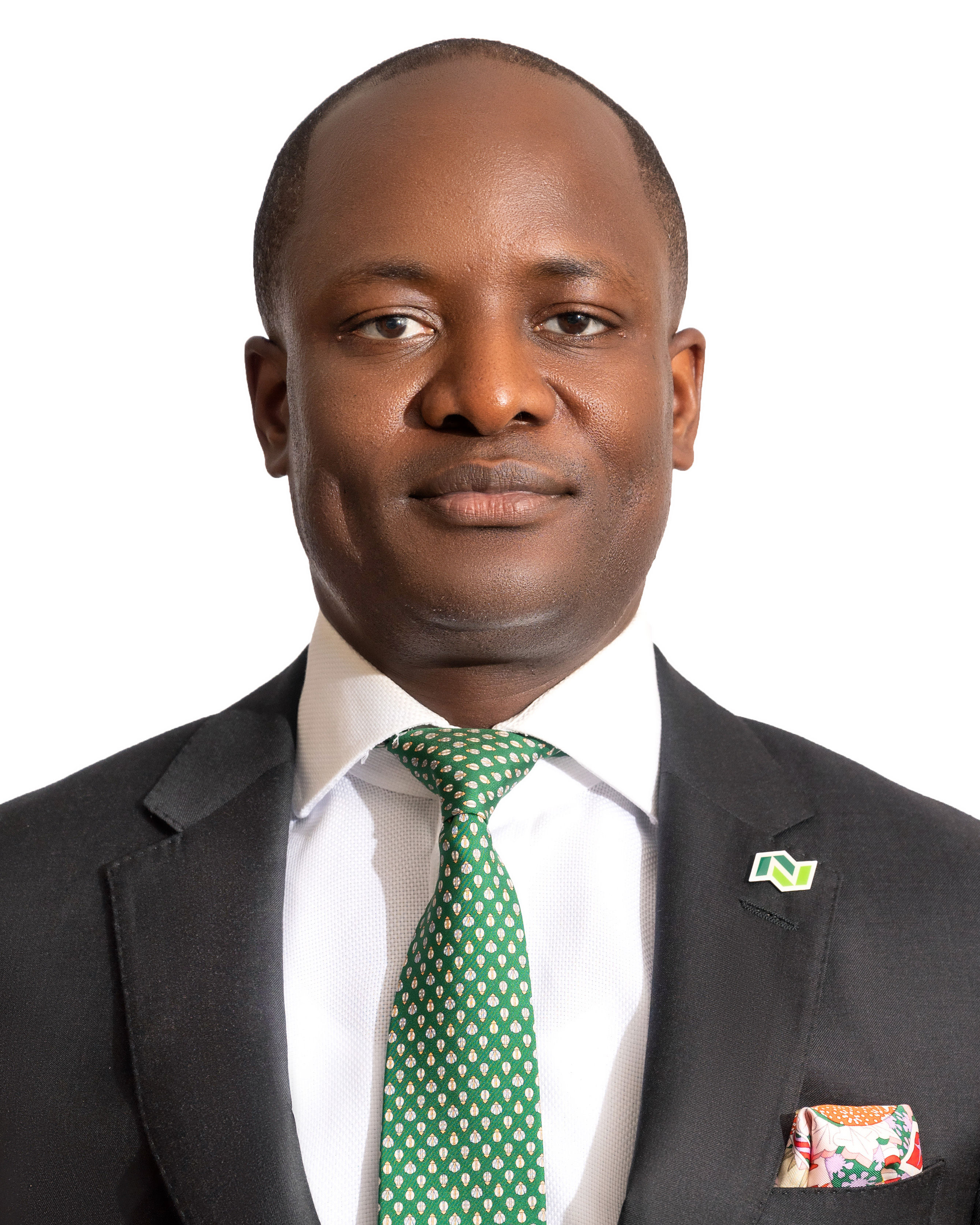
- Popoola in 2025
- Born: June 17, 1980 (age 46); Nigeria
- Citizenship: Nigerian
- Education: University of Lagos, Massachusetts Institute of Technology, Harvard Business School
- Occupation: Financial services executive
- Years active: 2002–present
- Known for: Group Managing Director and CEO of NGX Group Plc

Temi Popoola (born 17 June 1980) is a Nigerian financial services executive and investment banker who is the Group Managing Director and Chief Executive Officer (GMD/CEO) of Nigerian Exchange Group (NGX Group). He is also the Chairman of the Central Securities Clearing System Plc (CSCS) and NG Clearing Limited, two key market-infrastructure institutions within Nigeria’s capital-markets ecosystem. A Wall Street–trained investment banker, Popoola previously was Chief Executive Officer of Nigerian Exchange Limited.

Before joining NGX Group, he held senior roles at Renaissance Capital, where he was CEO for West Africa, and earlier at CSL Stockbrokers, United Bank for Africa, and Bank of America Securities in New York.

== Biography ==
Popoola was born in London and holds a Bachelor of Science degree in Chemical Engineering (First Class Honours) from the University of Lagos in 2002. He earned a Master of Science degree from the Massachusetts Institute of Technology in 2006, where he was twice awarded the MIT Rozeau Fellowship alumnus of Harvard Business School. He is a Chartered Financial Analyst (CFA) charter-holder, obtained FINRA's Series 7 and 63 licensures and a fellow of the Chartered Institute of Stockbrokers (CIS).

== Career ==
Popoola began his career in London in 2002, working as a portfolio manager focused on African energy markets.

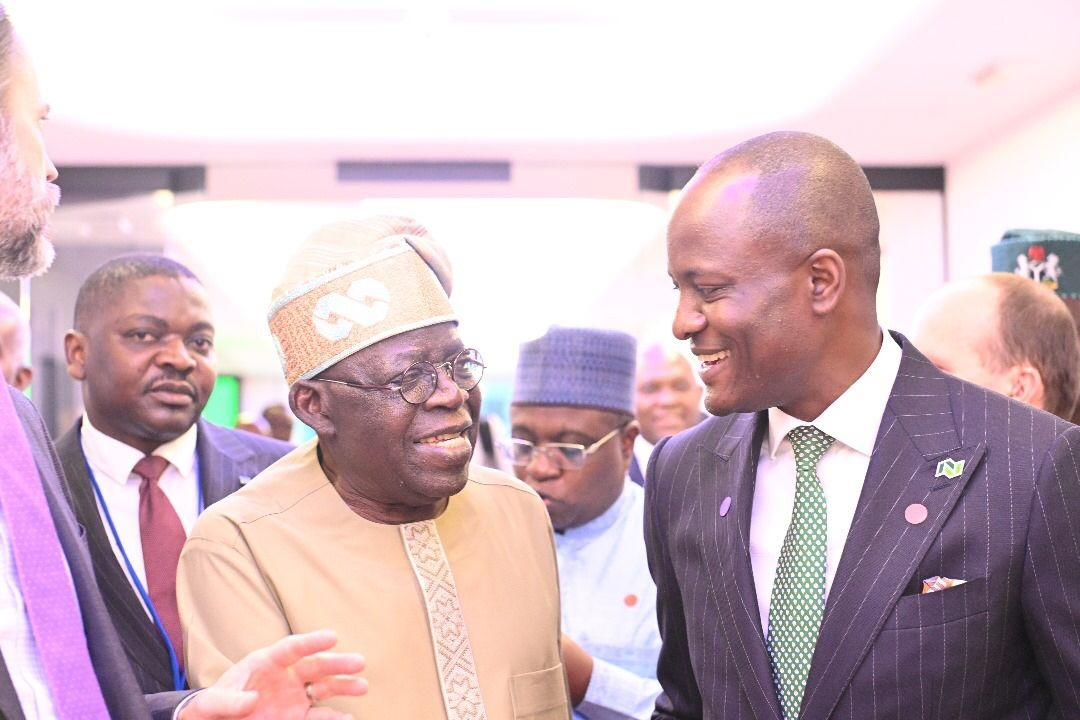
Temi with President Tinubu in New York

In 2006 he joined Bank of America Securities in New York as an equity derivatives trader. In 2009, he joined United Bank for Africa PLC (UBA) as Head of Structured Products & Investments.

He then was Director of Sales & Sales Trading at CSL Stockbrokers (Lagos) from 2010 to 2015. In 2015, Popoola joined Renaissance Capital (“Rencap”) and rose to become CEO for Nigeria & West Africa.

In 2021 he was appointed CEO of Nigerian Exchange (NGX) subsidiary following the demutualization of the former Nigerian Stock Exchange. On 29 December 2023, NGX Group announced his appointment as GMD/CEO-designate of NGX Group Plc, effective 1 January 2024, subject to regulatory approval.

He has overseen initiatives such as NGX Invest, a digital platform that has facilitated over ₦2.3 trillion in capital formation, and Project B.L.O.O.M, a community health programme addressing child malnutrition in underserved areas of Lagos.

In his role as the GMD, NGX Group has expanded its focus from market performance to measurable social and environmental impact through programmes like NGX Net-Zero.

Under Popoola’s leadership, NGX Group has emphasized product innovation, market-infrastructure enhancement and regulatory engagement.
