= Abdulmalik Asekomhe Afegbua =

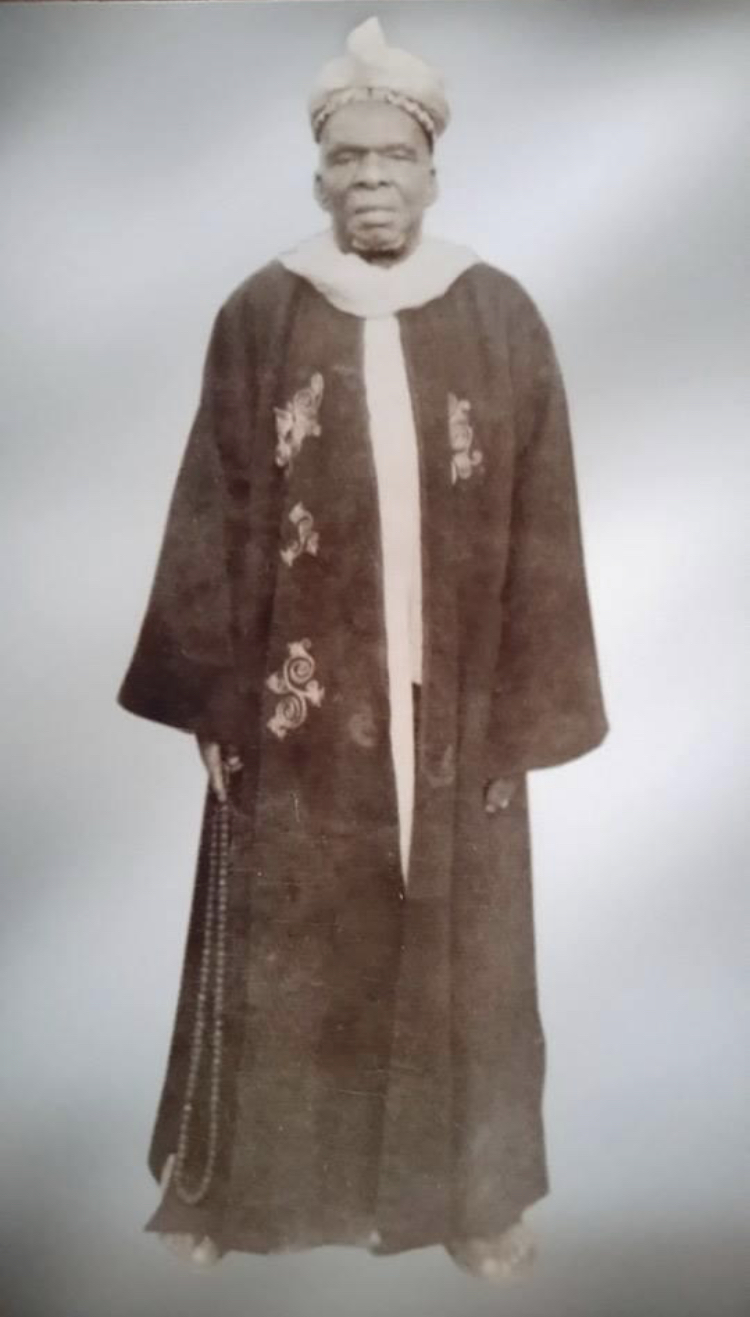

Onekhaifona
- Reign: 1942–1954
- Coronation: 1942
- Predecessor: Chief Chaba
- Successor: Chief Sado
- Born: c. 1845; Old AwuyemiOkpella
- Died: 1954 (aged 108–109); Okpella
- Burial: Okpella
- Spouse: 55 Wives
- Issue: Over 200
- House: Afegbua
- Father: Asekomhe Afemike
- Mother: Etatagbe
- Religion: Sunni Islam

Alhaji Abdulmalik Asekomhe Afegbua (c. 1845-June 8, 1954) (OBE) was a Nigerian King and the first Paramount Otaru of Okpella kingdom.

== Early life ==
Afegbua was born in Okpella around 1845, to Asekomhe Afemikhe & Etategbe Okhituama Ofeoshi of Awuyemi Okpella.
