= Mikano International Limited =

Nigerian company

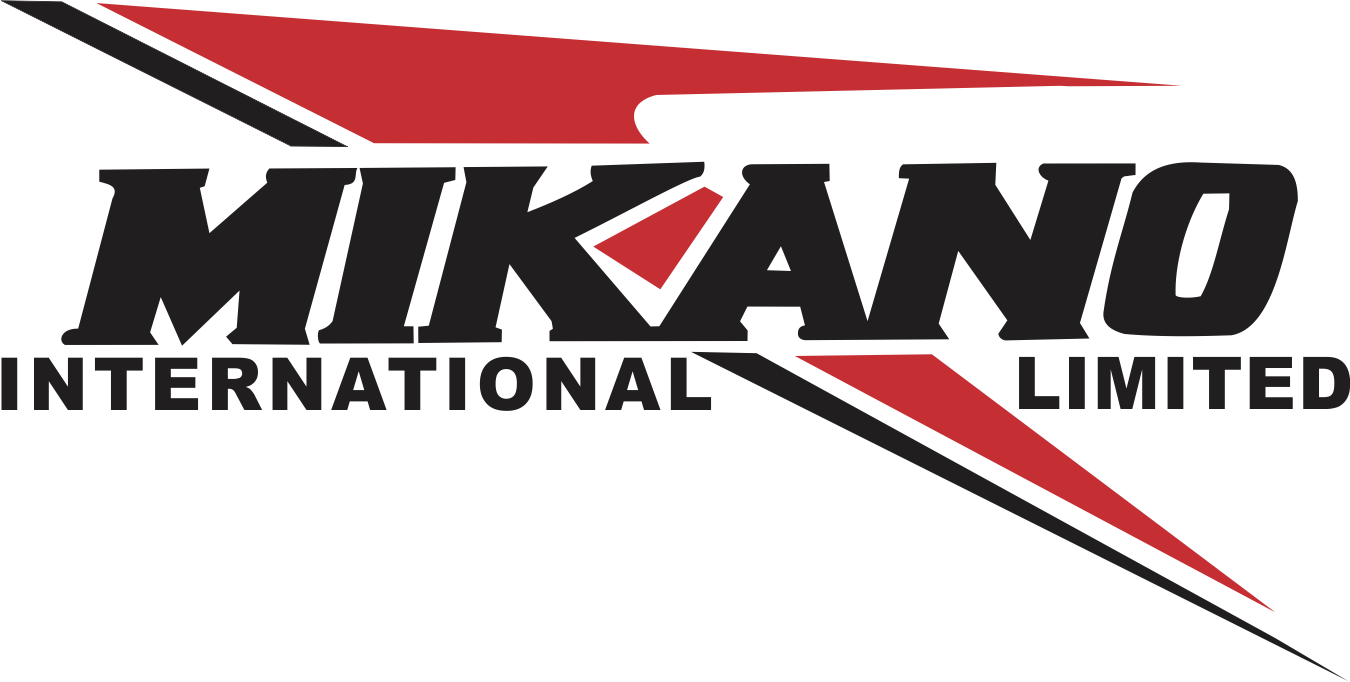
- Company type: Private
- Industry: Heavy equipment, Automotive
- Founded: 1993
- Headquarters: Mikano Head Office; 34,35 Acme Road, Ogba, Ikeja, Lagos State, Nigeria
- Areas served: Nigeria
- Key people: Mofid Karameh (Chairman)
- Products: Power Generation
- Website: mikano-intl.com

Mikano International Limited is a Nigerian company in the power generation, real estate and construction sectors. This company offers sales, maintenance, assembly and distribution of power generation products, real estate development, and sales of construction equipment.

Headquartered in Lagos, Nigeria, Mikano assembles power generating sets from manufacturers; MTU Onsite Energy (Germany), Perkins and Stamford alternator (United Kingdom), providing diesel and gas generating sets ranging from 9kva to 20,000kva for homes and industries.

== History ==
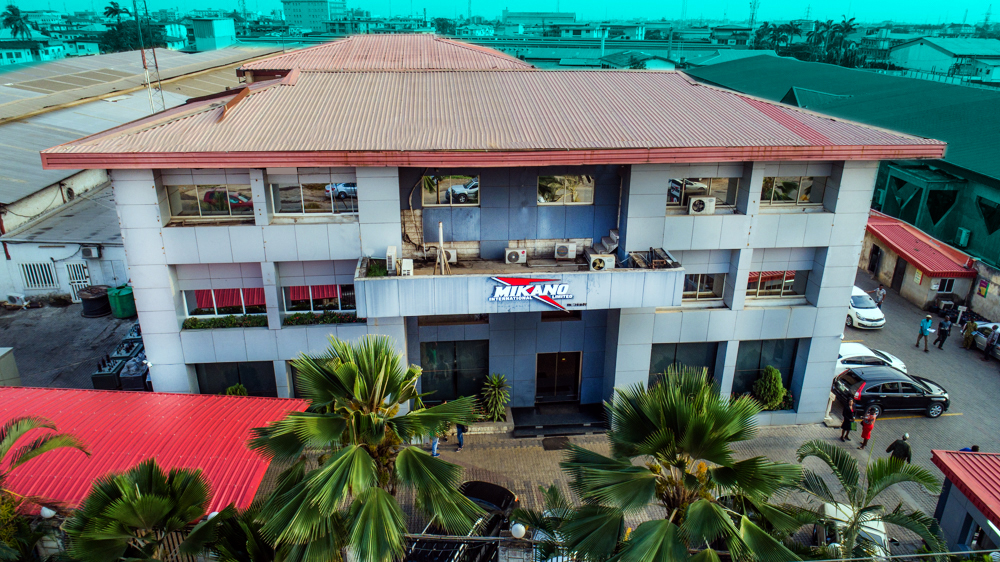
Mikano International Limited, Head Office

Established in 1993 with a focus on importing, servicing, and maintenance of generators, Mikano began to assemble generating sets in Nigeria.

Mikano has further diversified its activities from power generation into steel fabrication, electronics and lighting, and the construction industry. In 2016, it expanded its operation into the real estate space with the Karameh City Project, an industrial complex in Nigeria with eight warehouses measuring 7,200 square meters, located at Warewa, Ogun state.

== Business activities ==
Mikano has partnered with Schneider Electric, ABB, Raychem (as stockist of MV & HV products), Philips Lightings (as the supplier of fittings and lighting products) and Siemens (for type-tested compact sub-stations).

=== Power generation ===
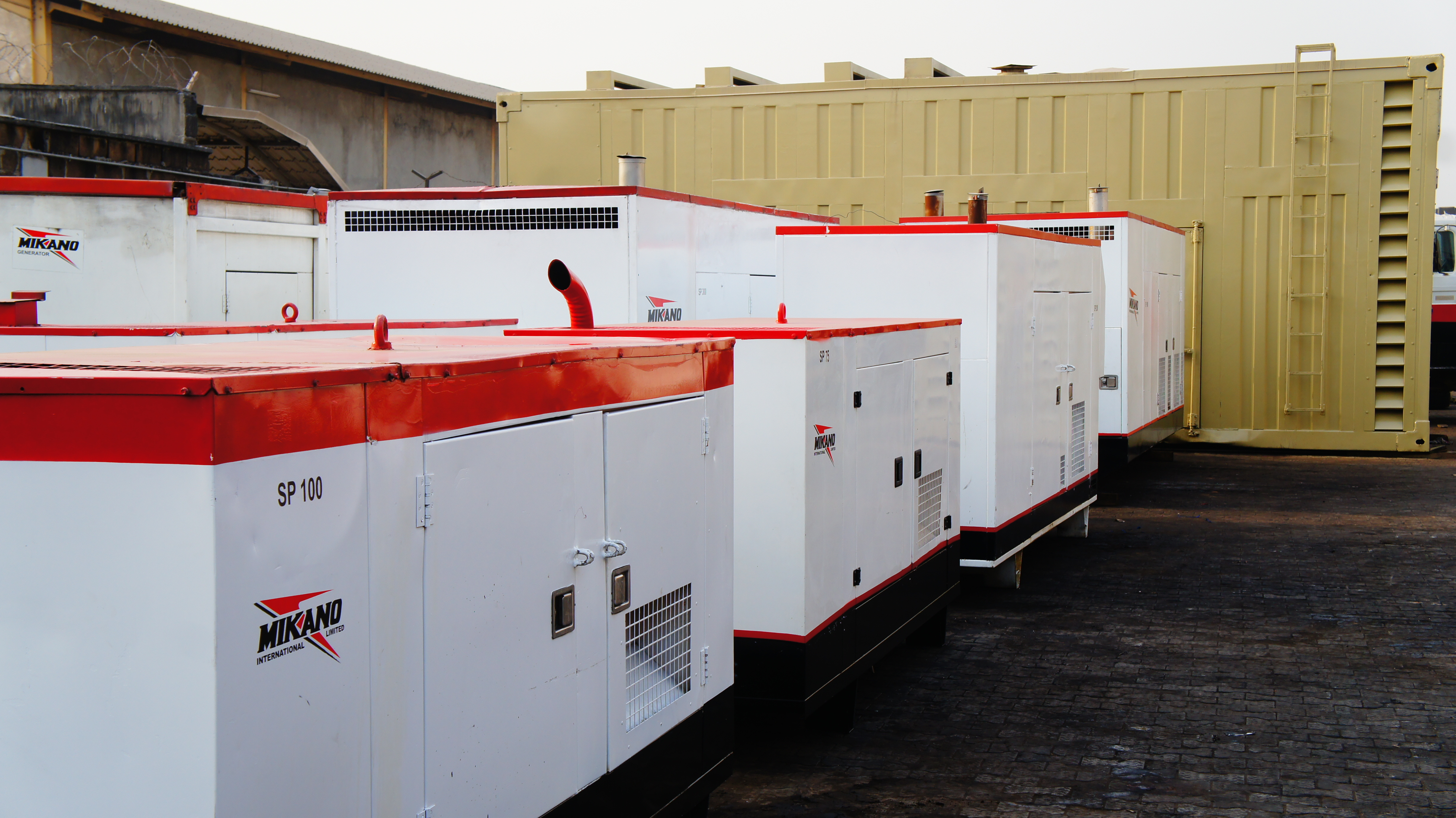
Mikano Power Generating Set

As an assembler of power generating sets for homes and industries, Mikano produces:

- Compressed Natural Gas (CNG) power generating sets
- Bi-fuel power generating sets operating on 70% gas and 30% diesel
- Independent Power Producer with Gas/Diesel power generation options, providing up to 60MW
- MAN Diesel and Gas generators up to 20,000 KVA

=== Steel fabrication ===
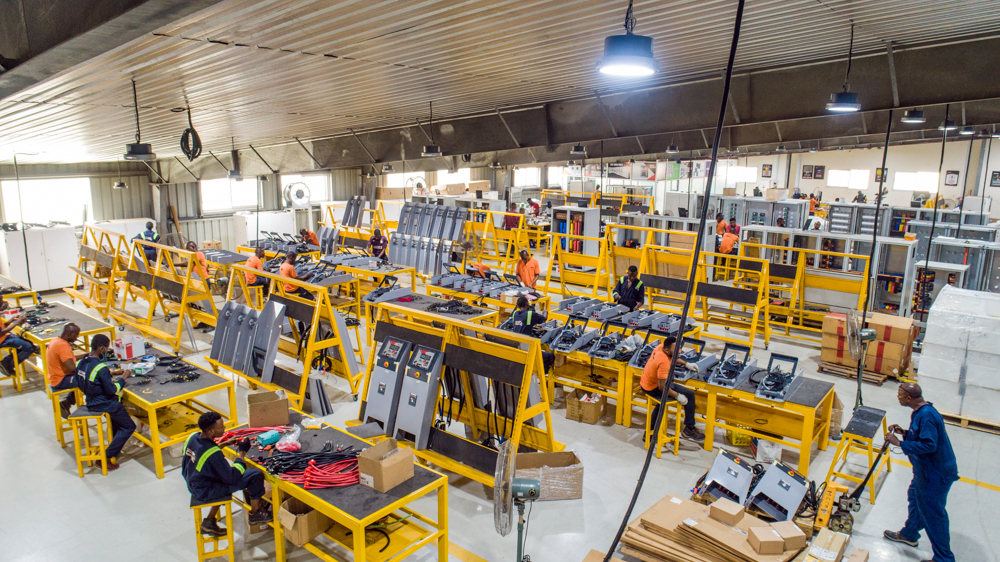
Mikano Factory Panel Section

In 2015, Mikano set up a steel fabrication factory where it manufactures and fabricates steel designs for street lamps, warehouse racks, supermarket shelves, and sound-proof canopies for generators.

=== Hyundai construction equipment ===
Mikano serves as an official distributor for Hyundai Engineering & Construction equipment including:

- forklifts distributing and servicing
- hydraulic excavators
- wheel and skid steer loaders
- backhoe loaders and forklifts

=== Real estate and construction ===
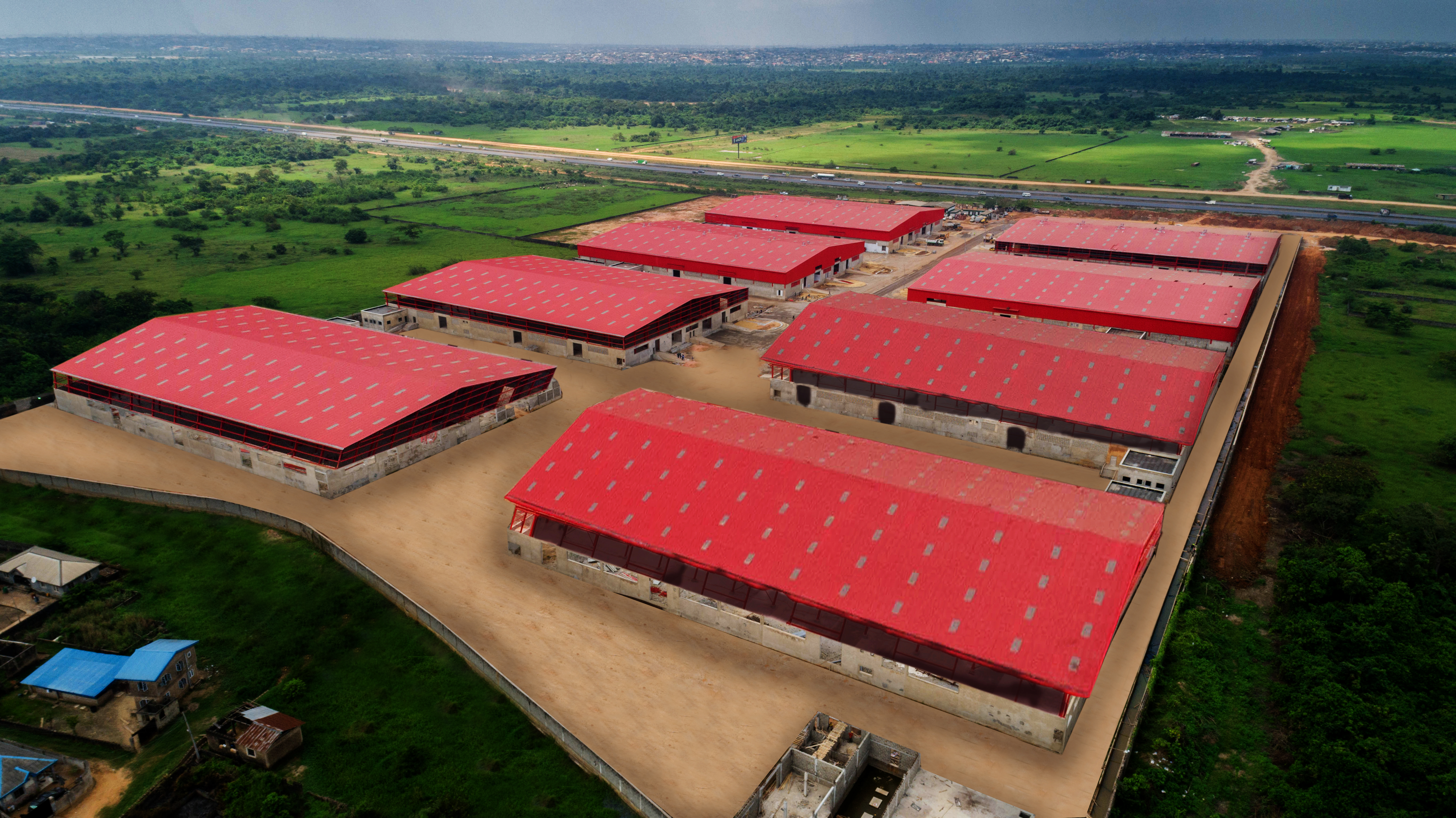
Mikano International Limited, Karameh City

In 2018, Mikano International Limited expanded Nigeria's real estate space with the Karameh City Project.

The project is its first industrial complex in Nigeria with eight warehouses measuring 7,200 square meters, located at Warewa, Ogun state. Mikano Construction unit also services development and execution of housing projects and high-rise buildings to turnkey developments and total infrastructural works.

== Corporate social responsibility ==
Mikano has implemented various social responsibility initiatives focusing on STEM projects and training for Nigerian students, and partnered with the Nigerian Police Force through the donation of police traffic stands across the country, as well as support for the blind.
