= Vitafoam Nigeria Plc =

Foam manufacturing company based in Lagos, Nigeria

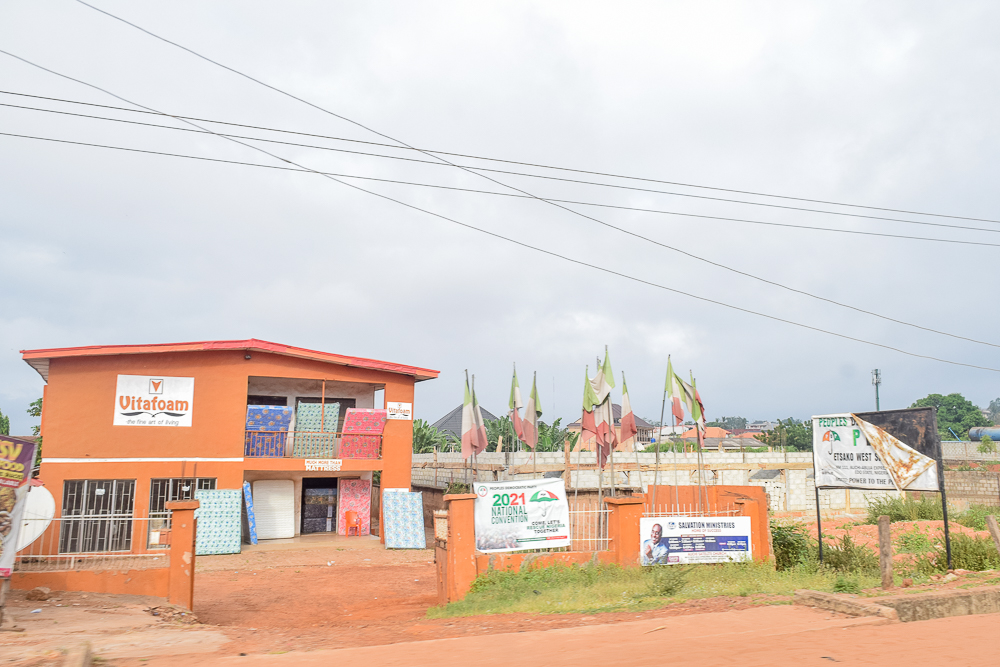
- Company type: Public
- Traded as: NSE:VITAFOAM
- Industry: Manufacturing
- Founded: 1962
- Founder: British Vita and G.B. Ollivant
- Headquarters: Lagos, Nigeria
- Area served: Nigeria, Ghana, Sierra Leone
- Products: Mattresses, Pillows, Foam Products, Rigid Polyurethane, Insulation Materials
- Website: www.vitafoamng.com

Vitafoam Nigeria Plc is a foam manufacturing company based in Lagos, Nigeria. It is one of Nigeria's largest foam manufacturers, producing both flexible and rigid polyurethane products. The company also owns interest in Vitafoam Ghana and Vitafoam Sierra Leone.

== History ==
The company was founded in 1962 by British Vita in a partnership with local distributor G.B. Ollivant. Production of latex foam pillows and mattresses began in 1963 at Ikeja Industrial Estate. Under new laws effective in 1978, British Vita reduced its equity from 50% to 20%.

In 2011, it entered into a strategic alliance with struggling competitor, Vono Products before purchasing the company. The purchase of Vono Products increased the company share of the furniture market. In the 2000s, the company expanded its product offering by investing in modern sleep options that are now managed by four of its subsidiaries: Vitapur, Vitagreen, Vitavisco and Vitablom. Vitapaur offers insulation friendly building materials.
