= Malik Afegbua =

Nigerian artist and Creative technologist

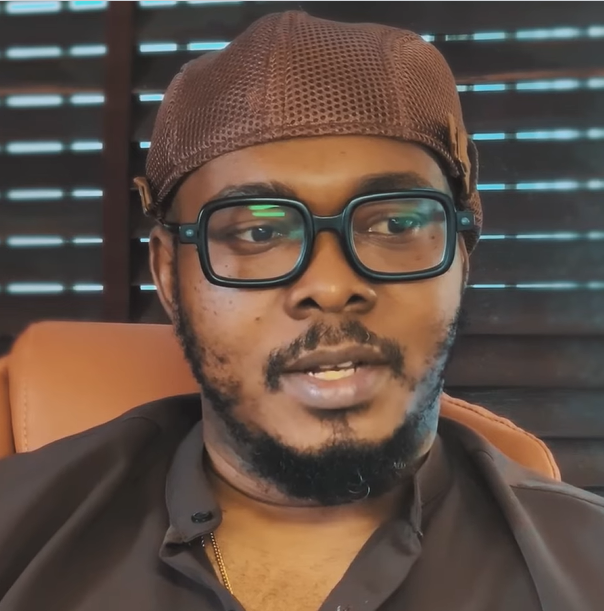
- Occupations: Filmmaker, visual artist, creative technologist and writer
- Known for: use of artificial intelligence technology in the field of arts and the Fashion show for the elders
- Spouse: Ese-lami Afegbua
- Children: Tobias Afegbua

Malik Afegbua is a Nigerian filmmaker, artist and creative technologist. He is well known for his outside the box thinking approach by applying the use of AI technology in the field of arts.

In January 2023, he became viral and received widespread media attention from around the world when he posted images on social media platforms titled The Elder Series where he showcased and depicted seniors on a fashion runway, draped in stylish and colourful clothes using AI. He was soon praised for his portrayal of elderly people in a more positive light by using AI, but also received criticism on the negative impact caused by artificial intelligence on the art as AI is deemed to kill the human creativity skills. His artwork however challenged the common stereotypes which surrounded around how older people are being perceived in modern society.

== Career ==
He was an amateur photographer and visual artist during the time frame of 2011 at a time when he also received a Canon camera as a gift from one of his friends. The Canon camera which he received as a gift became a turning point in his life as he switched to arts and photography from being a business-school graduate pivot. He used the Canon camera to produce videos and he even gone to create films and corporate videos by transforming himself as a self-taught filmmaker. He founded the Slickcity Media and under the production banner he has created advertisements, commercials, documentary films and virtual exhibitions for notable companies and brands like American Express and Meta, however since he went viral he has serviced more prominent names like Marvel studios, IBM and Cadbury.

He has been using AI platform Midjourney, which helps to generate images in response to text prompts. He also uses Adobe Photoshop to edit and crop related to his art work. He rose to limelight and prominence with his ground-breaking idea of showcasing fashion through the lens of artificial intelligence through The Elder Series in January 2023 and subsequently he received invitations to exhibit his art work in France, Brazil and the United States of America. He took inspiration to make the AI fashion show titled The Elder Series or also known as Fashion Show for Seniors after watching his mother who suffered a stroke. He used his imagination working in conjuncture with the AI software by showing older ageing looking models in beautiful clothes. The World Health Organization heaped praise for his unique artwork by quoting him a major, positive contributor in the global effort by the WHO/UN's Decade of Healthy Ageing in combatting ageism. The Academy Award winning costumer designer Ruth E. Carter praised his works calling this is so dope in an Instagram post.
