= Allianz Nigeria Insurance =

Nigerian insurance company

Allianz Nigeria Insurance Ltd.
- Formerly: Ensure Insurance Plc.
- Type: Private
- Industry: Insurance
- Founded: 1993 as "Union Assurance Company Plc"
- Headquarters: Broad Street, Lagos, Nigeria,
- Key people: Dickie Ulu (Chairman) Adeolu Adewumi-Zer (Managing Director) Jaideep Goel (Executive Director)
- Number of employees: 200+
- Website: www.allianz.ng

Allianz Nigeria Insurance Ltd (formerly Ensure Insurance plc) is a privately held insurance company in Nigeria. It is licensed by the National Insurance Commission, which is the main insurance regulator in Nigeria.

== Overview ==
Allianz sells life and non-life insurance services including vehicle, home, life and education insurance as well as savings plans.

The company also sells general business insurance products, including fire and special perils, burglary, computer and electronic equipment all-risk, money, compulsory, professional indemnity, machinery/plant all risks, contractors all risks/erection, and goods-in-transit insurance.

Allianz Insurance can be contacted at the following locations

- Head Office – Lagos Island
- Ikeja Office – Ikeja, Lagos
- Yaba Office – Yaba, Lagos
- Festac Office – Festac Town, Lagos
- Abuja Office – Abuja
- Port Harcourt Office – Port Harcourt
- Ibadan Office – Ibadan
- Benin Office – Benin City

== History ==
Incorporated in 1993 as Union Assurance Company plc, the company was relaunched as Ensure Insurance plc in 2016. It was acquired in 2018 by Allianz and rebranded as Allianz Nigeria Insurance plc. In 2017, the company generated gross written premiums of N7.67billion, representing an 86% growth over 2016 (N4.19billion). In May 2018, Allianz Nigeria Insurance plc officially became a company of The Allianz Group. In December 2020, in line with its strategy, a full privatization of the company’s shares was completed and Allianz Nigeria Insurance plc ceased to operate as a publicly traded company. It will henceforth operate as Allianz Nigeria Insurance Ltd.

== Governance ==
Allianz is governed by a six-person board of directors. Dickie Ulu, is the chairman of the board. Adeolu Adewumi-Zer, is the Managing Director.
