= United Africa Company of Nigeria =

Lagos-based conglomerate

- Formerly: Nigerian Motors Ltd (1931-1943); United Africa Company Ltd (1943-1955)
- Type: Public
- Founded: 1931; 95 years ago
- Headquarters: Lagos, Nigeria
- Parent: United Africa Company Ltd

The United Africa Company of Nigeria is a Nigerian publicly listed company based in Lagos. Its areas of operation include manufacturing, services, logistics and warehousing, agricultural and real estate. UACN's food operations include UAC Franchising, UAC Restaurants and UAC Dairies. It also has equity stake in UACN Property Development Company, a quoted firm, CAP Plc, makers of Dulux paints and Portland Paints, manufacturers of Sandtex paints.

A former chairman of the board was Senator Udoma U.Udoma when Mr Larry Ettah was serving as Group Managing Director and CEO in 2010.

== History ==
UAC Nigeria also known as UACN was first incorporated in Nigeria under the name Nigerian Motors Ltd on April 22, 1931 as a wholly owned subsidiary of the United Africa Company Ltd, the firm that later became UAC International (UACI). UAC International, a subsidiary of Unilever, included in its business, the trading activities formerly carried on by a number of other companies including The Niger Company Ltd. and the African and Eastern Trade Corporation Ltd, all of which had long-standing trading links with West Africa.

=== Trade Period ===
At inception, United Africa Company of Nigeria was a subsidiary of UACI's group of companies in Nigeria, a group that was incorporated to transact in selected markets within the country. Many of these companies later became divisions under UAC of Nigeria in 1973 following a consolidation exercise.

UACN's business activities was initially in the auto trade market but soon expanded into other areas. Strategic to its business conduct in Nigeria, the firm believed in the development of the economy and an improvement in the income of farmers and Nigerians as key to its success, this belief partly motivated its drive to expand into other areas of business. A major segment of the firm was produce buying of cash crops from local farmers for export to foreign markets. This activity also involved extension of credit to traders and middlemen who went into the hinterland to source for quality grades of produce. The firm operated in this market through staffing of personnel at different buying stations or through the use of traders and middlemen. When marketing boards were created for major cash crops such as palm kernels, Cocoa and groundnuts, UAC of Nigeria was appointed as one of the licensed buying agents. The company also traded in other agricultural products not regulated by the government such as hides and skins, beeswax, rubber, shea nut, castor seed, piassava, kapok, coffee, copra and gum. The revenue from the sale of agricultural produce was used to import various goods for sale in the Nigerian market.

The firm's trade in consumer goods such as shirts, shoes, electrical appliances and mechanical equipment involved importation from various countries of the world, a process overseen by its parent company. Many goods distributed by the company were sold by middlemen or associate companies such as Kingsway Stores.

The firm also managed transportation of bulk palm oil at buying points and storage at various ports in the country for onward distribution to foreign markets. The firm had a fleet of river crafts operating within the internal water ways of the country, an operation that was managed out of UAC's office at Burutu. In addition, the firm helped to introduce new machinery for many pioneer oil mills in Eastern Nigeria.

=== Restructuring period ===
The company, whose name was changed to United Africa Company Ltd in 1943, retained the name until 1955 when it became The United Africa Company of Nigeria Ltd and started acquiring, over a period of five years, a large part of the business of UAC International. In 1960 C.W.A. Holdings Ltd, England also a subsidiary of Unilever, acquired the interest of UAC International in the company. Further re-organisation concluded in 1973 and resulted in the acquisition of a number of wholly owned fellow subsidiaries of C.W.A. Holdings. In 1968, Niger House, the new head office of UACN was completed. The 12 storey building was built by Taylor Woodrow and has adjacent structures including an 8-storey building at the rear.

Following re-organisation, the company conducted the acquired businesses as operating divisions, which are now in voluntary liquidation. The company took the name UAC (unilever)of Nigeria Ltd in 1973. In compliance with the Nigerian Enterprises Promotion Act 1972, 40 percent of the company's share capital was acquired in 1974 by Nigerian citizens and associations and in accordance with the provisions of the Nigerian Enterprises Promotion Act 1977, an additional 20 percent of the UAC's share capital was publicly offered in 1977, increasing Nigerian equity participation to 60 percent. The name UACN Plc was adopted in 1991.

== Historical divisions ==
From 1973 onwards, UACN managed many of the Nigerian assets of its parent company. At a point in time, the company managed 22 divisions and subsidiaries.

=== Kingsway stores ===
Kingsway Stores was a department store headquartered in Lagos and managed by the firm. It was the first modern departmental store established in British West Africa. The first Kingsway store was opened in Lagos in 1948 and by 1982, the firm had 13 stores across major cities in the country including a three-storey store at Ibadan. The stores initially provided access to consumer goods found in departmental stores of foreign countries, but over time, majority of its SKUs were procured in Nigeria. Towards the end of the 1980s, price and currency regulations and a downturn in the economy forced the closure of many stores and eventually the closure of Kingsway Stores.

=== Textiles ===
UAC's textile division was one of the largest textile distributors in Nigeria. The division was formed as combination of the textile businesses of UAC and G.B Ollivant. At its height the company designed and distributed wax prints.

=== A.J. Seward ===
A.J. Seward was a manufacturer of personal care products that was majority owned by UAC International, the firm was formally introduced to Nigeria in 1968. Prior to the incorporation of A.J. Seward in Nigeria, UAC's department of drugs and personal care handled the importation of Seward's products. The department was later merged with a newly formed A.J. Seward Nigeria limited. The firm began operations marketing importing toiletries before establishing a personal and hair care factory at Zaria and later at Oregun, Lagos. In 1980, the company's main warehouse was opened in Oregun, Lagos. Many of the firm's products became popular such as Pears baby care products, Nku, Lotus, Jellen, Fresh and Shield.

=== Tractor and Equipment ===
T and E or Tractor and Equipment handled the franchise to sell Caterpillar trucks in Nigeria. UAC's relationships with CAT officially began in 1950. Mining of tin in Jos had created a market for mining equipment which prodded the firm to begin selling mining machinery in the country. The firm's product also included CAT's agricultural, infrastructure maintenance and marine engineering products. The firm also sold Braithwaite steel tanks and storage products.

=== Foods division ===
UAC International established a consumer food trading arm in 1958 called West African Cold Storage. The firm later merged with Wall's Company. In 1973, the company was collapsed into UACN to become its Food division. The division markets meat related products and cold storage of food and meat products.

=== African Timber and Plywood ===
The firm operated African Timber and Plywood from Sapele in Delta State. The facility was an expansion of an old saw mill originally managed by Miller Bros out of Koko, Delta State. The firm transferred the old saw mill at Koko to Sapele in 1929. Between 1945 and 1951, additional investments were poured into the facility. A plywood mill was commissioned in 1948 and the old mill was replaced in 1951. Major sources of wood were Iroko and Mahogany trees with one species known as Sapele mahogany. Initially the products of the mills were mostly for foreign markets but an expanding local market caused an inwards focus to generate sales. The products of the firm included cresta branded plywood, ATAPEX particle board, flushed doors and furniture.

=== Federated motors ===
Federated Motors assembled Bedford trucks from completely knocked down parts. UAC international's involvement in the motor trade dates back to its early years when it imported Bedford trucks into the country. The firm later imported partially assembled chassis and cabs before assembling knocked down parts. The firm's factory at Apapa churned out trucks with payloads between 1 and 8 tonnes. The firm also sold Bedford buses including its BF model used by commercial transport companies.

== Operations ==
In 1994, Unilever which had a minority stake in UACN, divested its interest which were sold to local investors.

UACN has divested from many of its legacy divisions, its current business operation is led by food related products managed through its UAC Foods, UAC Dairies, Grand Cereal and Oil Mills and UAC Restaurants strategic business divisions. In addition to food products, the firm is involved in property development through interest in the publicly listed UACN Property Development Corporation and also in logistics through MDS logistics. The firm acquired significant interest in Chemical and Allied Products Plc, makers of Dulux paints and in Livestock Feeds Plc.

== Products ==
UACN markets brands such as Mr Biggs fast food restaurants, SWAN Water (natural spring water repositioned from 2013 to the top of the category by its sales team), Gala, Grand oils, Supreme Ice Cream. UAC Dairies markets Supreme Ice Creams and through Grand Cereal and Oil Mills, UACN produces and markets Grand Pure cooking oil brands.

Mr. Biggs was founded in 1986, an idea that began as a coffee shop in Marina, Lagos Island. The fast food operation is in more than 170 locations across 29 states of Nigeria. Apart from Mr. Biggs, the firm also manages other fast food restaurants such as Village Kitchen, Chicken Inn, Pizza Inn and Creamy Inn.

== See also ==
- List of Nigerian companies
- Economy of Nigeria
