= Okpella =

- Town
- Okpella
- Interactive map of Okpella
- Country: Nigeria
- State: Edo
- LGA: Etsako East

Population (2023)
  - Total: 500,652
  - Rank: 4th

GDP (PPP, 2015 int. Dollar)
  - Year: 2023
  - Total: >
- Climate: Aw

Okpella (Note: Okpella has been administered as one entity) is a clan situated along Benin-Abuja federal high way. Going by the last National Census figures, it has a population of 20,652 and is one of the three main towns that make up Etsako East Local Government Area of Edo State. It is made up of two sub-clans, each with their villages; Ogute sub-clan, which is made up of Ogute-Oke, Awuyemi, Imiekuri, Igiase and Imiegeli, Okhu villages, and Oteku sub-clan, comprising Komunio and Iddo. The language spoken in the clan is Okpella, a dialect of Bini which has evolved. Okpella is known for its natural sedimentary rock based mineral resources, which include gold, limestone, calcium, and granite, feldspar, talc, clay, marble, and it plays host to the defunct Bendel Cement Factory, BUA Cement Factory and Dangote Cement Factory.

The people of Okpella are predominantly farmers, and are known to grow in large numbers, yams, cassava, tomatoes and ogbono. Its Ewo market, located at Okugbe in Oteku sub-clan and on the busy Benin-Abuja Road and congregates every fourth day. Okpella is a natural town with citizens who share a communal bond prevalent in most African societies, the town also consists of Muslims and Christians who live peacefully among themselves despite their religion backgrounds.

== History ==
The origin of Okpella people was not documented, it was preserved in oral traditions like African people.

The sub-clans in Okeplla were created as a result of clashes between HRH. Abdulmalik Asekhomhe Afegbua and Chief Sado Ikor in 1935. Afegbua, who had assumed the position of Clan Head in 1916 later became the district head of the Kukuruku Division in 1920, leaving the Clan Head position vacant for Sado to become the Clan Head. In 1929, the district system in Nigeria was abolished, Afegbua returned to Okpella to contend for the position of Clan Head, which led to communal clash that ended up to an election conducted for both Afegbua and king SADO. King SADO was the reigning Eramhe (father of the clan) and won the ballot and continued as the sole clan head till his demise in 1952. Chief Afegbua thereafter returned to ascend the clan head of Okpella again.

The Late Clan Head, HRH. Andrew Yesufu Eshioramhe Dirisu who reigned for 48 years came from Ogute Sub-Clan.

== Tradition ==
The Okpella people believe in a supreme deity called Eshinegba, which is known as creator of all things both in the physical world (agbo) and the spirit world (ilimi).

== Villages ==
- Afokpella, Awuyemi, Iddo, Igiase, Imiegele, Imekuri, Ogute-Oke, Okugbe, Okhu Ogriga

== See also ==
Borgatti, Jean (1980). The festival as art event : form and iconography : Olimi festival in Okpella clan, new yam festival, Etsako Division, Midwest State, Nigeria. University Microfilms International. OCLC 645789117.
