= BUA Cement =

Nigerian business

BUA Cement PLC is a publicly listed firm headquartered in Nigeria, it produces and markets cement products in the country. It is the second largest producer in Nigeria after Dangote Cement. The company was formed through the consolidation of the cement interest of the BUA Group, promoters of Obu Cement Company and the Kalambaina Company majority owned Cement Company of Northern Nigeria.

BUA Group's entry into the cement market began in 2008 when the government gave them the license to import cement to a selected group of entrepreneurs. BUA initially began operations with a floating cement clinker, re-bagging the products before it went on to purchase controlling interest in the struggling Edo Cement plant. Majority of the firm's raw materials are found close to its plant locations in Edo and Sokoto States.

The company was listed on the Nigerian Stock Exchange in January 2020 with a market cap of $3.2 billion.

== History ==
=== Obu Cement ===
In 2009, BUA Group purchased interest in Edo Cement Company, Okpella, a company that previously traded under the name of Bendel cement. As production was on a decline at the plant, BUA commissioned a new plant at Obu, a few kilometres from Okpella, production from the new clinker began in 2014, later another production line was added in 2019. Combined production capacity at its two lines is 6 million tonnes.

=== CCNN ===
The Cement Company of Northern Nigeria was incorporated in 1962 as the first cement manufacturing firm in the Northern Nigeria region. The first plant was built by a West German engineering firm at the cost of three million pounds. The capacity of the first plant was 200,000 tonnes per annum producing through a dry process kiln. Throughout its operations, technical and management difficulties affected the running of the clinker. In 1988, a new 600,000 tonnes plant was commissioned and the old one was later decommissioned. The company was founded by the Northern Nigeria Development Company and sourced its limestone from the Kalambaina formation nearby. BUA Group acquired controlling interest in CCNN in 2009 and in 2018, it facilitated the merger of its solely owned Kalambaina Cement with the publicly listed CCNN. The firm's Kalambaina plant includes investment in energy infrastructure such as a power plant to supply electricity and coal mining to fuel the plant.
