= Nigerian Exchange Group =

Stock exchange located in Lagos, Nigeria

Nigerian Stock Exchange
- Type: Stock exchange
- Location: Lagos, Lagos State, Nigeria
- Founded: 1961
- Owner: Nigerian Exchange Group Plc.
- Key people: Temi Popoola
- Currency: Naira (₦)
- No. of listings: 328
- Market cap: ₦131 trillion (April 10, 2026)
- Indices: NGX All-Share; NGX Premium; NGX 30; NGX 50; NGX Corporate Governance Index; NGX Banking; NGX Consumer Goods
- Website: ngxgroup.com

The Nigerian Stock Exchange (NGX), now Nigerian Exchange Group, is an integrated stock exchange group in Africa founded in 1961 in Lagos. Following the demutualization of the NSE in 2021, NGX Group now has 3 subsidiaries - Nigerian Exchange Limited (NGX), the operating exchange; NGX Regulation (NGX RegCo, the independent regulation company; and NGX Real Estate (NGX RelCo). The operating exchange, NGX, is a multi-asset exchange with 393 listed securities, comprising 151 listed companies (8 Premium Board, 133 Main Board, 7 Growth Board and 3 ASeM companies), 157 Fixed Income securities, including Green Bonds and Sukuk (106 FGN, 8 State and 43 Corporate Bonds), 12 Exchange Traded Products, 4 Index Futures and 69 Memorandum listings, as at September 12, 2024.

== Mission ==
The NGX mission is to enable businesses and investors to have reliable access to capital and provide secure saving systems and structure for effective and efficient business operations.

== History ==
The Nigerian Stock Exchange was initially founded on September 15, 1960 as the Lagos Stock Exchange. The exchange is the oldest existing stock exchange in West Africa. There were seven subscribers to the Exchange's Memorandum of Association: R.S.V. Scott, representing C.T. Bowring and Co. Nigeria Ltd.; Chief Theophilus Adebayo Doherty; John Holt Ltd; Investment Company of Nig. Ltd.(ICON); Sir. Odumegwu Ojukwu; Chief Akintola Williams; and Otuoraha Enajewe Henry .

Operations began officially on August 25, 1961, with 19 securities listed for trading. However, informal operations had commenced earlier in June 1961. Operations were initially conducted inside the Central Bank building with four firms as market dealers: Inlaks, John Holt, C.T. Bowring, and ICON (Investment Company of Nigeria). The volume for August 1961, was about 80,500 pounds and it rose to about 250,000 pounds in September of the same year with the bulk of the investments in government securities. In December 1977 it became known as The Nigerian Stock Exchange, with branches established in some of the major commercial cities of the country.

In 2021, the demutualisation of the NSE was initiated which led to the emergence of the Nigerian Exchange Group (NGX Group) Plc and three subsidiaries – Nigerian Exchange Limited (NGX), NGX Regulation Limited (NGX RegCo), and NGX Real Estate Limited (NGX RelCo).

== Operations ==
Nigerian Exchange has been operating an Automated Trading System (ATS) since April 27, 1999, with dealers trading through a computer network. In 2013, NGX launched its next-generation trading platform, X-Gen, intended to enable electronic trading for the retail and institutional segments. Trading on The Exchange starts at 9.00 a.m. and closes at 4.00 p.m. every Monday - Friday. Market prices, along with an All-Share Index, NGX 30, and Sector Indices, are published daily in The Stock Exchange Daily Official List, NGX CAPNET (an intranet facility), newspapers, and on the stock market page of the Reuters Electronic Contributor System. Historical price and performance data are also posted on the NGX website.

In order to encourage foreign investment into Nigeria, the government has abolished legislation preventing the flow of foreign capital into the country. This has allowed foreign brokers to enlist as dealers on the exchange, and investors of any nationality are free to invest. Nigerian companies are also allowed multiple and cross-border listings on foreign markets.

In a bid to promote transparency and trust in the capital market, NGX reconstituted the Investors' Protection Fund in 2012. The Fund is mandated to compensate investors who suffer pecuniary loss arising from the revocation or cancellation of the registration of a dealing member; insolvency, bankruptcy or negligence of a dealing member; or defalcation committed by a dealing member or any of its directors, officers, employees or representatives.

== Regulation ==
The NGX is regulated by the Nigerian Securities and Exchange Commission.

== Leadership and subsidiaries ==
Nigerian Exchange Group is led by a Group Managing Director/Chief Executive Office, a position currently held by Temi Popoola. Following the demutualisation and rebranding in 2021, NGX Group is made up of the following wholly owned subsidiaries:

- Nigerian Exchange Limited (NGX), with Jude Chiemeka as the Chief Executive Officer
- NGX Regulation Limited (NGX REGCO) led by the Chief Executive Officer, Olufemi Shobanjo
- NGX Real Estate Limited (NGX RELCO), led by the Acting Chief Executive Officer, Gabriel Igbeka.

In October 2022, the NGX Board announced the appointment of Dr. Umaru Kwairanga as its new chairman.

== Indices ==
The Exchange maintains a value-weighted All-Share Index formulated in January 1984 (January 3, 1984, = 100). Its highest value of 66,371.20 was recorded on March 3, 2008. In March 2026, the All-Share Index crossed 200,000 points for the first time in its history, marking a historic milestone driven by increased institutional liquidity and banking sector recapitalisation. The Exchange also uses the NGX-30 Index, which is a sample-based capitalization-weighted index, as well five sector indices. These are the NGX Consumer Goods Index, NGX Banking Index, NGX Insurance Index, NGX Industrial Index, and NGX Oil/Gas Index.

== Associations ==
The Nigerian Exchange is a member of the World Federation of Exchanges (FIBV). It is also an observer at meetings of the International Organization of Securities Commissions (IOSCO) and a founding member of the African Stock Exchanges Association (ASEA). On 31 October 2013, it joined the Sustainable Stock Exchanges Initiative (SSE).

== See also ==
- List of African stock exchanges
- List of stock exchanges
- List of stock exchanges in the Commonwealth of Nations
