= Banking in Nigeria =

The banking industry in Nigeria started during the colonial era with the establishment of Colonial Banks, with the primary aim of meeting the commercial needs of the Colonial Government. The banking system in Nigeria is regulated through the Central Bank of Nigeria. This apex bank started operation on July 1, 1959.

== Background ==
In 1892, the African Banking Corporation and the Bank of British West Africa, now the First Bank of Nigeria, were established in Nigeria. In 1925, Due to some difficulties the bank folded up its activities and the Bank of British West Africa Limited (BBWA) was established to take over the activities of the African Banking Corporation. The Bank of British West Africa Limited opened its first branch in Lagos in 1894; in the later part of the same year the name of the bank was changed to Standard Bank of Nigeria known as the First Bank of Nigeria Limited [now a public limited company, PLC. The Anglo-Egyptian Bank and the National Bank of South Africa gave birth to Barclays Bank in Nigeria. In 1948, the British and French Bank for Commerce and Industry started operations in Nigeria, which metamorphosed into the United Bank for Africa. The first domestic bank In Nigeria was established in 1929 and called the Industrial and Commercial Bank. The bank liquidated in 1930 and was replaced by Mercantile Bank in 1931. The African Continental Bank was created in 1949 as the only sustainable indigenous bank after the liquidation of the Industrial and Commercial Bank. The year 1947 shows the emergence of an agricultural bank called the Nigerian Farmers and Commercial Bank.

== The modified universal banking model ==
In 2010, the Central Bank of Nigeria re-modified the existing universal banking model that permits a commercial banking license holder to operate in other non-core banking activities, either directly or indirectly, through designated subsidiaries. The introduction of this scheme classifies banking licenses into commercial, merchant, and specialised Development Banking Licenses.

== Nigeria banking reform ==
Nigeria banking reform can be divided into two main phases, 2004 and 2009. Each phase had significant economic effects:

=== Banking Reform of 2004 and its effect ===
This reform focused on bank consolidation through the mechanisms of merger and acquisition. This resulted in the rebasing of commercial banks from ₦2 billion to ₦25 billion, while the 89 existing commercial banks in the country became 25.

The apex bank apart from capitalization also invested in banking automation which enhances banking returns. The reform established a reporting portal for bank customers for the purpose of information sharing. Under this reform, deposits from the public sector and government-owned agencies can be collected by commercial banks in order to enhance their level of liquidity.

==== Banking Reform of 2009 and its effect ====
The Asset Management Corporation of Nigeria AMCON was established in 2009 by the National Assembly of Nigeria. The institution acquires non-performing loans of commercial banks. The financing of AMCON is composed of a ₦50 billion CBN fund and 0.3% of total assets of participating commercial banks. It also supports the implementation of International Financial Reporting Standards (IFRS) for global reporting compliance in terms of reporting. This reform reviewed the universal banking model by restricting commercial banks to banking activities only. The reform also addresses excessive banking interest by the creation of a non-interest bank.

Sarah Alade, Deputy Governor of the Central Bank of Nigeria, announced that five Nigerian bank CEOs were being dismissed in August 2009. Five replacements were named with immediate effect including Funke Osibodu to lead the Union Bank of Nigeria and Suzanne Iroche who took over as CEO of FinBank.

Anele explained that the product has been rolled out in Nigeria before subsequent release in other countries where UBA operates.

On her part, Dupe Olusola, UBA’s group head of marketing, said the bank is committed to empowering its customers to fund their urgent needs.

== See also ==
- Central Bank of Nigeria
- Asset Management Corporation of Nigeria
