= Yemi Cardoso =

Nigerian banker (born 1957)

Governor of the Central Bank of Nigeria
- Incumbent
- Assumed office 15 September 2023
- President: Bola Tinubu
- Deputy: Muhammad Sani Abdullahi; Emem Nnan Usoro; Philip Ikeazor; Bala Bello
- Preceded by: Folashodun Shonubi (acting)

Personal details
- Born: Olayemi Michael Cardoso; 10 July 1957 (age 69) Lagos, British Nigeria
- Spouse: Abimbola Chima Cardoso
- Children: 5
- Parent: Felix Cardoso
- Education: Bachelor of Science
- Alma mater: Aston University; Harvard Kennedy School
- Website: Official website

Olayemi Michael "Yemi" Cardoso (born 10 July 1957) is a Nigerian banker who is the governor of the Central Bank of Nigeria. He previously served as the Commissioner for Economic Planning and Budget of the Lagos State Government.

Cardoso's private sector career included banking, stockbroking, consulting, and an appointment as the Chair of the Board of Citibank Nigeria. He also served as a member of the Cities Alliance’s Africa Think Tank Group; board member of MRS Oil; Chairman, board of EFInA; member, advisory board of Lagos Business School; and Chairman, board of the African Venture Philanthropy Alliance. He was also an Executive Lead at Harvard Kennedy School Alumni Association and the founding chairman and co-chair of Ehingbeti Summit, a Lagos State Economic Think Thank.

On 15 September 2023, Bola Tinubu appointed Cardoso to serve as the governor of the Central Bank of Nigeria, for a term of five years pending his confirmation by the Nigerian Senate. On 23 September 2023, Cardoso was officially confirmed as the Governor of the Central Bank of Nigeria.

== Education ==
Olayemi Cardoso was educated at Corona School Ikoyi and St. Gregory's College, Lagos. He thereafter attended Aston University, United Kingdom, earning a Bachelor's degree (B.Sc.) in Managerial and Administrative Studies in 1980. He also studied for a Master's degree in Public Administration from the Harvard Kennedy School of Government (HKS) graduating in 2005 as a fellow of the distinguished Michael Romer Memorial Scholarships.

== Career ==
=== Banking and financial services ===
Cardoso had a brief spell with Howard Tilly & Co., Chartered Accountants in London before taking up a role with Citibank. Cardoso went through the Citibank credit training program in Athens, Greece, and was subsequently mobilised to Citibank in Abidjan, Ivory Coast in 1982. He operated within the West Africa Regional Office/Non-Presence Country desk, which encompassed multiple countries in the sub-region where Citibank had exposure to sovereign debt but no physical presence. In 1982, Cardoso returned to Nigeria and joined Chase Merchant Bank, an affiliate of Chase Manhattan. Within the bank, he worked as a member of the credit and marketing team, focusing on trading, construction, and oil and gas relationships.

In 1984, he rejoined Citibank as a founding member of Nigeria International Bank Limited assuming the role of Head of the World Corporation Group, responsible for managing crucial global relationships for Citibank. He also became a member of the bank's credit committee with responsibility for assessing and approving credit limits.

In 1988, Cardoso was charged with setting up Citibank's first branch outside Lagos, in Kano, Nigeria. From Kano, he led the bank's operations across the north of Nigeria. Subsequently, Cardoso was appointed Vice President.

In 1990, Olayemi, along with fellow Citibank colleagues, founded Citizens Bank, Nigeria where he assumed leadership roles as the Head of Corporate Banking and Head of Treasury and Financial Institutions consecutively. In addition, he served as an Executive Director of the bank for eight years.

=== Lagos State government ===
In 1999, with the transition to democratic rule in Nigeria, Cardoso was appointed a Commissioner in Lagos State. He set up and oversaw the Ministry of Economic Planning & Budget, which functioned as the think-tank of the administration.

During his tenure within the Lagos State Government, Cardoso chaired various cabinet-level committees, including but not limited to:

- Cabinet Project Monitoring Committee
- Lagos Urban Transport Project Office (which later evolved into Lagos Metropolitan Area Transport Authority)
- Privatization Committee
- Lagos Water Corporation
- State Security Trust Fund Committee (which he pioneered), and
- State Pension Fund Committee

=== Board membership of Citibank ===
In 2007, Cardoso chaired the audit committee of the board of Citibank. He held this position until 2010, when he was appointed as a board member and subsequently Chairman of the Board.

As Chairman, Cardoso was a strong advocate for diversity and gender inclusion.

=== Development work ===
Cardoso founded the Africa Institute for Leadership and Public Administration (AILPA), which focused on promoting private-public partnerships.

He is a member of the Nigerian National Advisory Board on impact investing and serves on the advisory board of Lagos Business School.

Cardoso is also a member of the Board of Trustees for DRASA Health Trust, a public organization established in honour of the late Dr. Ameyo Adadevoh.
