= Kingsley Obiora =

Nigerian banker (born 6 March 1976)

Deputy Governor of Economic Policy at the Central Bank of Nigeria
- In office 16 January 2020 – 15 September 2023
- Preceded by: Professor Joseph Nnanna

Personal details
- Born: March 6, 1976 (age 50) Oshimili South, Delta State, Nigeria
- Spouse: Rita Obiora
- Education: University of Benin and University of Ibadan
- Occupation: Economist

Kingsley Obiora (born March 6, 1976) is a Nigerian economist who served as the Deputy Governor of Economic Policy at the Central Bank of Nigeria from 2020 to 2023. He was the deputy governor under the former governor Godwin Emefiele until 15 September 2023.

== Education ==
Obiora holds a bachelor's degree in economics and statistics from the University of Benin in 1999. He proceeded to the University of Ibadan for an MSc in economics, and subsequently a PhD in monetary and international economics. He also graduated from an advanced management course at Harvard Business School.

== Career ==
Obiora was appointed as the Deputy Governor of the Central Bank of Nigeria on 16 January 2020 by president Muhammadu Buhari, and he was confirmed by the Nigerian Senate on 30 January 2020. Obiora joined the International Monetary Fund in 2007, and worked at the European Department.

He was also a technical adviser to the economic management team of president Goodluck Jonathan between 2011 and 2014.

Between 2003 and 2006, he worked at the Centre for Econometric and Allied Research (CEAR), and from 2014 to 2018, he served as Special Adviser to the Central Bank of Nigeria governor, and subsequently joined the IMF again as alternate executive director between 2018 and 2019

In April 2020, he was appointed chairman of Africa Finance Corporation. In May 2020, he was appointed as chairman of the Board of Directors of the Nigerian Export-Import Bank.

== Controversy ==
=== CBN suspension ===
Obiora's tenure at the Central Bank of Nigeria ended following the emergence of a new government led by Bola Ahmed Tinubu. The government removed the CBN governor, Godwin Emefiele under controversial circumstances, and by effect Obiora and other deputy governors; Folashodun Shonubi, Aishah Ahmad, Edward Lametek Adamu. On 1 September 2023, it was alleged that Obiora had been arrested by the Department of State Security over investigative issues of CBN, although he was released later.
