= Peter Ololo =

- Born: c. 1957; Nigeria, United Kingdom
- Occupation: stockbroker

Peter Ololo or Peter Ukuoritsemofe Ololo (born c. 1957) was a Nigerian stockbroker who was implicated in the 2009 Financial crisis in Nigeria.

== Life ==
He came to notice when five bank CEOs were sacked from five of the leading Nigerian banks on 13 August 2009 and five replacements were named by the Central Bank of Nigeria. Olufunke Osibodu was chosen to lead the Union Bank of Nigeria replacing Bartholomew Bassey Ebong. Others replaced on the same day included the CEO of FinBank who was replaced by Suzanne Iroche. The other banks involved were Intercontinental, Afribank and Oceanic where Cecilia Ibru had led the bank.

Ololo had been employed by Union Bank but he had left the bank to become a finance expert.

It was estimated that Ololo's companies had borrowed more than $700m from the five banks. On the 10 December 2009 as was named by the Wall Street Journal as the stockbroker who "made the market" as the one who was now taking the "big fall".

In 2014, Ololo and several previous directors of the Union Bank of Nigeria were taking part in trial of their alleged offences.
