= Federal Government Girls College, Bida =

Federal Secondary school in Bida, Niger State, Nigeria

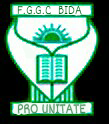

Location
- Lemu, 3km Zungeru, Road, Bida; Bida, Niger State, 921; Nigeria; 9.0704859°N 5.9995329°E

Information
- Type: Secondary school
- Motto: PRO UNITATE
- Religious affiliation: Mixed
- Established: 14 October 1974
- Founders: Federal Ministry of Education, Nigeria
- Staff: 75
- Gender: Girls
- Age: 12 to 18
- Colours: White and Green
- Nickname: FEGGICOBIDA
- Website: fggcbida.com

The Federal Government Girls College, Bida (FGGC BIDA) is a secondary boarding school for girls at Bida, Niger State, Nigeria. It was established in 1974.

== History ==
FGGC Bida was established in 1974 and the first set graduated in 1979. It was established in the desire for Nigeria's national unity, national integration and academic excellence. As a boarding school, the school has educated girls who have entered the professions in different fields of life working nationally and internationally.

The Federal Government Girls College Bida is among the 104, Federal Government owned unity schools managed by the Federal Ministry of Education, Nigeria. Location of the school at Bida, Niger State. Bida is a Local Government Area in Niger State, Nigeria, A Nupe, speaking town.

== Notable alumnae ==
- Aishah Ahmad, Deputy Governor of the Central Bank of Nigeria
- Beatrice Jedy-Agba, lawyer and anti-human trafficking advocate
- Justice Amina Adamu Aliyu, High Court Judge, Kano State
- Rita Anuku, Miss Nigeria 1986
- Sabina Umeh, MBGN 1990

== See also ==
- Education Index
- Category:Secondary education by country for secondary education in individual countries
- List of schools by country
- List of countries by secondary education attainment
