= Folashodun Shonubi =

Nigerian economist (born 1961)

Acting Governor of the Central Bank of Nigeria
- In office 9 June 2023 – 15 September 2023
- President: Bola Tinubu
- Preceded by: Godwin Emefiele
- Succeeded by: Yemi Cardoso

Deputy Governor of the Central Bank of Nigeria (Operations Directorate)
- In office 17 October 2018 – 15 September 2023
- Governor: Godwin Emefiele

Personal details
- Born: Folashodun Adebisi Shonubi; 7 March 1962 (age 64)
- Party: Nonpartisan
- Education: University of Lagos
- Profession: Banker

Folashodun Adebisi Shonubi (born 7 March 1962) is a Nigerian economist who served as the acting governor of the Central Bank of Nigeria from 9 June to 15 September 2023. He was the deputy governor (Operations Directorate) under the former CBN governor Godwin Emefiele until he was succeeded. He resigned from the central bank in September 2023.

On 15 September 2023, major news articles in Nigeria claimed that all deputy governors of the CBN mainly Folashodun Shonubi, Aishah Ahmad, Edward Lametek Adamu and Kingsley Obiora were removed from office alongside their principal, Godwin Emefiele who had been earlier suspended by President Bola Ahmed Tinubu.

== Life ==
Shonubi graduated from the University of Lagos from 1978 to 1983 after obtaining a BSc. and MSc. in Mechanical Engineering, a Master in Business Administration specializing in Finance between 1988 and 1989.

His first working experience was at Mek-ind Associates where he worked as consultant engineer from 1984 to 1989 then later as a marketing executive at Inlaks Computers Limited.

From 1990 to 1993, Shonubi was the Head of Treasury Operations of Citibank before proceeding to First City Monument Bank as vice president and Ecobank Nigeria Limited as executive director.

From 1999 to 2007, he worked at MBC International as the deputy general manager.

From 2009 to 2012, he was employed by Union Bank of Nigeria Limited as an executive director, operations, technology and services.

From 2012 to his appointment as the deputy governor of CBN (Operations Directorate), he was the managing director and chief executive officer of the Nigeria Inter-Bank Settlement System PLC.

On 9 June 2023, President Bola Ahmed Tinubu appointed him as the acting governor of Central Bank of Nigeria following the suspension of Godwin Emefiele. Following the appointment of Yemi Cardoso as governor of the central bank, Shonubi resigned from the CBN. Major newspapers in Nigeria at the time claim that Shonubi and his co-Deputy Governors were removed from office by President Bola Ahmed Tinubu while some others claim they were forced to resign. Shonubi who was appointed Deputy Governor by President Muhammadu Buhari in June 2018 with Senate confirmation in October 2018 was due for reappointment for another term of five-years in October 2023, before his sudden exit from the Bank.

== Awards ==
Shonubi holds the National Honours of the Commander of the Order of the Niger (CON).
