= List of countries by tertiary education attainment =

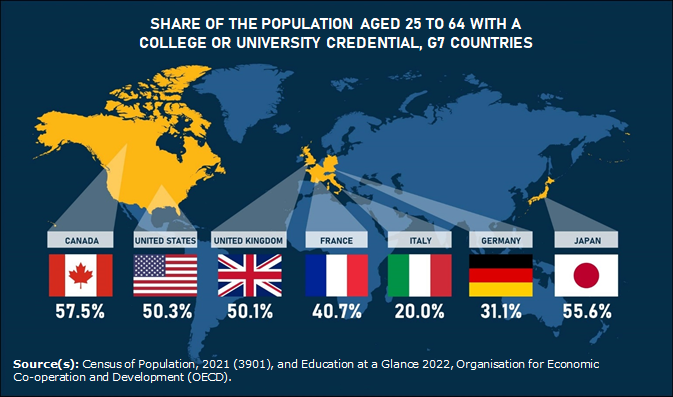
Largest share of college or university graduates in the G7

This article presents lists of countries by tertiary education attainment rate, and the number of people who attained tertiary education.

Tertiary education is the educational level following the completion of a school providing a secondary education. The World Bank, for example, defines tertiary education as including universities as well as institutions that teach specific capacities of higher learning such as colleges, technical training institutes, community colleges, nursing schools, research laboratories, centers of excellence, and distance learning centers.

== National statistics ==
This is a list of the overall proportion of the population who have attained tertiary education (at least ISCED 5) in each country. Whenever possible, the proportion is calculated from only those aged 25 and above, as this largely excludes the people who are still in the process of attaining tertiary education and yields a more accurate percentage.

Country/Territory	Year	Age Included	Population (Note: Excluding invalid categories (e.g. "unknown" or "not stated") whenever possible.)	Attained tertiary education (Note: Referring to completion whenever possible.)		Ref
Country/Territory	Year	Age Included	Population	#	%	Ref
Albania	2022	≥ 25	1,742,061	343,756	19.73	
Algeria	2008	≥ 6			7.6	
American Samoa	2020	≥ 25	25,724	5,867	22.81	
Andorra	2024	≥ 18			38.2	
Angola	2014	≥ 24	9,300,000 (Note: Approx.: the figure is calculated using ratio and is an approximation)	234,676	2.5	
Antigua and Barbuda	2011	≥ 25	48,305	5,101	10.56	
Argentina	2022	≥ 25	28,249,041	5,541,310	19.62	
Armenia	2022	≥ 25	2,052,168	561,212	27.35	
Aruba	2010	≥ 25	66,180	8,430 - 15,318	12.74 - 23.15	(Note: Interpret with caution: all figures excluded people who were still in school.) (Note: MBO, classified as secondary vocational education (level 3) by Netherlands, was listed as level 5 (associate level) under ISCED 1997 by Aruba; thus, it was unclear if the entire MBO is considered tertiary. Both figures are included due to the great variation between them.)
Australia	2021	≥ 25	16,173,871	7,011,329	43.35	(Note: Including the external territories of Australia that are inhabited: Cocos (Keeling) Islands, Norfolk Island, and Christmas Island.)
Austria	2021	≥ 25	6,740,769	1,709,681	25.36	(Note: Including people who completed College for higher vocational education, the 5th year of which was considered non-university tertiary education.)
Azerbaijan	2019	≥ 25	6,260,769	1,086,985	17.36	
Bahamas	2010	≥ 25	197,354	45,095	22.85	
Bahrain	2020	≥ 25	1,018,593	333,448	32.74	
Bangladesh	2022	≥ 25	86,349,180	7,367,720	8.53	
Barbados	2010	≥ 15	181,997	28,774	15.81	(Note: Of the 168,192 people above the age of 15 not attending school full time, 28,774 attained tertiary education. Another 13,005 people were attending school full time, amongst which the completion rate of tertiary education was not reported. Hence this is likely an underestimate.)
Belarus	2019	≥ 25	6,889,605	1,950,002	28.30	
Belgium	2021	≥ 25	7,757,249	2,521,874	32.51	
Belize	2010	≥ 14	284,999	41,514	14.57	
Benin	2002	≥ 15			1.9	
Bermuda	2016	≥ 25	48,062	19,614 - 14,951	40.81 - 31.11	(Note: The population who attained a Bermuda College Diploma is listed as a single group without further breakdown: this group includes diplomas classified as either "post-secondary non-tertiary" or "short-cycle tertiary" by UNESCO. Both figures are included due to the great variation between them.)
Bhutan	2017	≥ 6	655,003	59,052	9.02	
Bolivia	2012	≥ 19	5,919,871	1,431,681	24.18	
Bosnia and Herzegovina	2013	≥ 25	2,516,642	350,140	13.91	
Brazil	2024	≥ 25	142,271,000	29,236,000	20.55	
British Virgin Islands	2010	≥ 0	25,341	5,939	23.44	
Brunei	2021	≥ 15	334,709	60,730	18.14	
Bulgaria	2021	≥ 15	5,602,067	1,560,028	27.85	
Burkina Faso	2019	≥ 25	6,544,840	216,000	3.3	
Burundi	2008	≥ 15	4,336,870	22,585	0.52	
Cape Verde	2022	≥ 15	352,494	32,127	9.11	
Cambodia	2019	≥ 25	6,852,692	320,671	4.68	
Cameroon	2005	≥ 15	4,995,897	334,961	6.70	
Canada	2021	≥ 25	26,154,860	13,762,145	52.62	
Cayman Islands	2021	≥ 15	56,455	22,368	39.62	
Central African Republic	2003	≥ 10			0.44	
Chad	2009	≥ 15	5,388,233	46,165	0.86	
Chile	2024	≥ 15	15,205,784	5,711,299	37.56	
China	2020	≥ 25	1,008,768,971	162,631,830	16.12	(Note: Including Mainland China only.)
Colombia	2018	≥ 25	25,985,257	6,752,123	25.98	
Comoros	2017	≥ 3	582,199	55,223	9.49	
Cook Islands	2021	≥ 25	9,060	2,228	24.59	
Costa Rica	2022	≥ 17			30.7	
Croatia	2021	≥ 25	2,920,444	761,832	26.09	
Cuba	2012	≥ 25	7,713,979	1,103,992	14.31	
Curaçao	2023	≥ 15	126,175	24,009	19.03	
Cyprus	2021	≥ 15	756,006	262,317	34.70	
Czech Republic	2021	≥ 25	7,865,508	1,508,534	19.18	
Denmark	2024	25 - 69	3,363,717	1,516,970	45.10	(Note: Excluding Greenland and Faroe Islands, which are territories of the Danish Realm outside of (Metropolitan) Denmark.)
Djibouti	2024	≥ 5	882,594	66,768	7.56	
Dominica	2011	≥ 25	41,541	7,421	17.86	
Dominican Republic	2022	≥ 25	5,719,910	1,553,934	27.17	
Ecuador	2022	≥ 25	9,596,261	2,251,983	23.47	(Note: Including those who had studied in higher technical and technological institutes for at least three years or universities for at least four years.)
Egypt	2017	≥ 25	45,099,314	7,439,798	16.50	
El Salvador	2024	≥ 25	3,627,212	524,742	14.47	
Estonia	2021	≥ 25	961,655	306,472	31.87	
Ethiopia	2007	≥ 15	40,566,742	434,071	1.07	
Equatorial Guinea	2024	≥ 15	989,546	71,000	7.2	
Faroe Islands	2011	≥ 25	31,265	10,145	32.45	
Federated States of Micronesia	2010	≥ 25	44,797	5,179	11.56	
Finland	2024	≥ 25	4,182,767	1,615,347	38.62	
France	2022	≥ 25	47,199,817	15,889,790	33.66	(Note: Including Metropolitan France and all of the overseas departments and regions of France besides Mayotte.)
French Polynesia	2022	≥ 15			17.90	
Gabon	2013	≥ 15	1,131,234	144,000	12.7	
Gambia	2013	≥ 12	1,195,362	36,990	3.09	
Georgia	2014	≥ 25	2,492,021	806,945	32.38	
Germany	2024	≥ 25	62,750,000	19,987,000	31.85	
Ghana	2021	≥ 15	19,873,607	1,535,945	7.73	
Gibraltar	2012	≥ 25	22,336	4,340	19.43	
Greece	2021	≥ 15	9,065,506	2,208,823	24.37	
Greenland	2023	25 - 74	36,490	5,842	16.01	
Grenada	2011	≥ 15	79,661	16,003	20.09	
Guatemala	2018	≥ 25	6,752,100	543,315	8.05	
Guinea	2014	≥ 15	5,787,192	237,000	4.10	
Guinea Bissau	2009	≥ 6	598,946	5,688	0.95	
Guyana	2012	≥ 15	504,325	39,093	7.75	
Haiti	2003	≥ 25	3,518,910	63,798	1.81	
Honduras	2013	≥ 25	3,530,843	242,544	6.87	
Hong Kong	2021	≥ 25	5,700,078	1,868,783	32.79	
Hungary	2022	≥ 25	7,215,169	1,779,601	24.66	
Iceland	2021	≥ 25	244,654	84,770	34.65	
India	2011	≥ 15	836,017,747	68,288,971	8.17	
Indonesia	2022	≥ 25	164,922,951	17,748,543	10.76	
Iran	2016	≥ 25	48,849,238	10,469,554	21.43	
Ireland	2022	≥ 25	2,998,525	1,454,671	48.51	
Israel	2024	≥ 25	5,579,274	2,152,990	38.59	
Italy	2022	≥ 25	45,819,650	8,427,490	18.39	
Jamaica	2011	≥ 25	1,408,708	194,160	13.78	
Japan	2020	≥ 25	82,225,982	34,327,168	41.75	(Note: Of the 96,709,823 people aged 25 and above, 96,373,910 had graduated, 90,063 never went to school, 245,829 were still in school, and the educational status for 21 people was unknown. Of the 96,373,910 who had graduated, the education attainment of 81,901,699 people was known, and of them 34,235,370 attained tertiary education. Of the 245,829 people aged 25 or above who were still in school, the education attainment of 243,220 were known, and of them 91,798 were in graduate school (i.e. completed a tertiary degree already). As a result, in total, the educational attainment for 82,225,982 people aged 25 or above were known, and of them 34,327,168 attained tertiary education.)
Jersey	2021	≥ 16	86,791	33,376	38.46	
Jordan	2015	≥ 24/25	4,327,907	1,212,187	28.01	(Note: Of the 4,267,495 people aged 25 and above not enrolled in schools, 1,197,236 people attained tertiary education, and of the 60,412 people aged 24 and above still enrolled in schools, 14,951 were enrolled in higher diploma or above.)
Kazakhstan	2021	≥ 25	11,936,493	3,424,783	28.69	
Kenya	2019	≥ 20	23,474,583	1,252,716	5.34	(Note: Interpret with caution: likely to be an underestimate due to the exclusion of Middle Level/Technical Vocational Education.)
Kiribati	2020	≥ 15	76,514	2,945	3.85	
Kosovo	2024	≥ 10	1,360,584	216,609	15.92	
Kuwait	2021	≥ 25	2,933,273	446,690	15.23	
Kyrgyzstan	2022	≥ 15	4,645,714	1,139,609	24.53	
Laos	2015	≥ 10	4,994,656	398,958	7.99	
Latvia	2021	≥ 25	1,390,240	482,251	34.69	
Liberia	2022	≥ 3	4,955,227	215,766	4.35	
Libya	2006	≥ 25	2,485,141	280,569	11.29	
Liechtenstein	2020	≥ 25	29,241	9,631	32.94	
Lithuania	2024	15 - 89	2,468,600	953,100	38.61	
Luxembourg	2021	≥ 25	469,013	171,423	36.55	
Macao	2021	≥ 25	418,160	133,499	31.93	
North Macedonia	2021	≥ 25	1,278,188	287,045	22.46	
Northern Mariana Islands	2020	≥ 25	29,449	8,733	29.65	
Madagascar	2018	≥ 25	8,969,811	408,937	4.56	
Malawi	2018	≥ 5	15,011,343	202,037	1.35	
Malaysia	2024	≥ 15	26,493,800	5,981,400	22.58	
Maldives	2022	≥ 25	212,730	62,060	29.17	
Mali	2022	≥ 15	11,280,253	492,937	4.37	
Malta	2022	≥ 15	455,430	116,830	25.65	
Marshall Islands	2021	≥ 25	18,676	3,488	18.68	
Mauritania	2013	≥ 10	2,385,160	50,905	2.13	
Mauritius	2022	≥ 25	870,341	109,377	12.57	
Mayotte	2017	≥ 25	100,007	13,757	13.76	
Mexico	2020	≥ 25	72,655,542	13,638,509	18.77	
Moldova	2024	≥ 25	1,690,201	391,853	23.18	
Monaco	2016	≥ 25	29,069	14,243	49.00	
Mongolia	2020	≥ 25	1,712,149	584,848	34.16	
Montenegro	2023	≥ 25	440,553	128,599	29.19	
Montserrat	2023	≥ 15	3,507	729	20.79	
Morocco	2024	≥ 10			10.2	
Mozambique	2017	≥ 25	9,065,684	213,510	2.36	
Myanmar	2014	≥ 25	26,923,273	2,411,222	8.96	
Namibia	2023	≥ 6/15	1,482,122 - 1,240,048	146,561	9.89 - 11.82	(Note: Amongst the 1,240,048 people who attended school previously were known, 146,561 completed tertiary education. Another 242,074 people aged 6 and above never attended school: it was unclear how many of them were above 15, so both figures are included in the total count.)
Nauru	2021	≥ 25	4,636	295	6.36	
Nepal	2021	≥ 15	21,049,003	1,371,761	6.52	
Netherlands	2023	15 - 75	13,505,330	4,390,900	32.51	
New Caledonia	2019	≥ 25	171,524	40,041	23.34	
New Zealand	2023	≥ 25	3,312,000	1,356,108	40.95	(Note: Excluding Cook Islands and Niue, which are in free association with New Zealand.)
Nicaragua	2005	≥ 25	2,077,673	207,350	9.98	
Niger	2012	≥ 25	5,188,405	99,400	1.92	
Nigeria	2007	≥ 25	53,360,995	9,088,478	17.03	
Niue	2022	≥ 25	971	273	28.12	
Norway	2024	≥ 25	4,023,987	1,815,792	45.12	
Oman	2020	≥ 25	2,711,901	468,875	17.29	
Pakistan	2023	≥ 25	98,301,519	8,696,796	8.85	
Palau	2020	≥ 25	12,118	3,829	31.60	
Palestine	2017	≥ 25	1,883,344	546,748	29.03	(Note: Of the 31,728 people aged 25 and above who were attending school, 11,091 attained tertiary education. Of the 1,851,616 people aged 25 and above who were not attending school, 536,357 attained tertiary education.)
Panama	2023	≥ 25	2,378,027	713,401	30.00	
Paraguay	2022	≥ 25	3,220,932	809,985	25.15	
Peru	2017	≥ 25	16,696,619	4,298,893	25.75	
Philippines	2020	≥ 25	54,669,916	18,633,973	34.08	
Poland	2021	≥ 25	27,777,217	7,743,922	27.88	
Puerto Rico	2022	≥ 25	2,400,393	949,883	39.57	
Portugal	2021	≥ 25	7,923,791	1,645,137	20.76	
Romania	2021	≥ 15	15,979,913	3,047,113	19.07	
Russia	2021	≥ 25	90,263,599	28,619,810	31.71	(Note: Including Crimea, which was annexed by Russia in 2014.)
Rwanda	2022	≥ 25	5,601,492	310,397	5.54	
Qatar	2020	≥ 25	2,095,843	722,977	34.50	
Saint Barthélemy	2022	≥ 25	8,020	2,737	34.13	
Saint Lucia	2022	≥ 0	162,965	24,953	15.31	
Saint Martin	2022	≥ 25	20,393	3,827	18.77	
Saint Pierre and Miquelon	2022	≥ 25	4,418	1,087	24.60	
Saint Vincent and the Grenadines	2012	≥ 15	77,858	4,403	5.66	
Samoa	2021	≥ 15	126,131	20,460	16.22	
San Marino	2025	≥ 0	27,597	5,163	18.71	
São Tomé and Príncipe	2012	≥ 25	69,689	2,202	3.16	
Saudi Arabia	2024	≥ 25			40.06	
Senegal	2023	≥ 15			6.4	
Serbia	2022	≥ 25	4,996,864	903,163	18.07	(Note: Excluding the Autonomous Province of Kosovo and Metohija, which was under the de facto control of Kosovo since 2008.)
Seychelles	2022	≥ 15	65,511	12,772	19.50	
Sierra Leone	2015	≥ 6	5,892,865	98,488	1.67	
Singapore	2020	≥ 25	2,977,767	1,438,788	48.32	
Sint Maarten	2011	≥ 25	19,034	4,393	23.07	
Slovakia	2021	≥ 25	3,849,567	962,584	25.00	
Slovenia	2024	≥ 25	1,604,327	459,281	28.63	
Solomon Islands	2019	≥ 25	313,795	40,244	12.82	
South Africa	2022	≥ 20	37,577,988	4,602,765	12.25	
South Korea	2020	≥ 25	38,342,229	16,016,148	41.77	
Spain	2021	≥ 25	35,892,336	12,025,256	33.50	
Sri Lanka	2012	≥ 15	15,227,773	499,563	3.28	
Sudan (Northern) (Now Sudan)	2008	≥ 25	11,583,463	756,220	6.53	
Sudan (Southern) (Now South Sudan)	2008	≥ 25	2,669,340	62,957	2.36	
Suriname	2012	≥ 15	351,453	28,345	8.07	
Swaziland	2017	≥ 10			13.0	
Sweden	2024	≥ 25	7,408,799	3,254,678 - 2,090,548	43.93 - 28.22	(Note: Population who completed a post-secondary education for less than three years (e.g. short cycle tertiary education, post-secondary non-tertiary education) is listed as a single group without further breakdown: the group partially includes those who have attained tertiary education; both figures are included due to the great variation between them.)
Switzerland	2023	≥ 25	6,320,430	2,622,999	41.50	
Syria	2004	≥ 25	6,643,167	695,442	10.47	
Tajikistan	2020	≥ 25	4,427,513	374,288	8.45	
Tanzania	2022	≥ 15	34,475,324	1,852,596	5.37	
Thailand	2010	≥ 25	43,149,847	7,076,759	16.40	
Timor Leste	2022	≥ 15	873,930	97,771	11.19	
Tunisia	2014	≥ 10	9,111,069	847,464	9.30	
Turkey	2021	≥ 15	63,529,344	13,265,861	20.88	
Turkmenistan	2022	≥ 25	3,854,184	369,545	9.59	
Tuvalu	2017	≥ 25	5,264	851	16.17	
Uganda	2024	≥ 10	31,312,980	1,774,614	5.67	
Ukraine	2020	≥ 15	32,075,800	8,445,200	26.33	
United Arab Emirates	2023	≥ 15			39.8	(Note: Calculated from available data: of the 78.5% of population who participated in labour force, 40.3% attained tertiary education; of the remaining 21.5% of the population outside of labour force, 38.1% attained tertiary education. As a result, about 39.8% of the population attained tertiary education.)
United Kingdom	2021	≥ 25	47,527,528	17,508,672	36.84	(Note: Including 15,185,055 people in England and Wales, 1,876,121 in Scotland, and 447,496 people in Northern Ireland who attained tertiary education. Excluding Jersey, Guernsey, Isle of Man, and all British Overseas Territories.)
United States	2022	≥ 25	226,600,992	97,567,079	43.06	(Note: Excluding all organized, unincorporated territories of the United States.)
United States Virgin Islands	2020	≥ 25	62,221	16,809	27.01	
Uruguay	2023	≥ 25			25.0	
Vanuatu	2020	≥ 15	179,302	3,478	1.94	
Venezuela	2011	≥ 25	14,144,718	3,517,000	24.86	
Vietnam	2019	≥ 15			12.6	
Wallis and Futuna	2023	≥ 20	7,738	1,012	13.08	
Yemen	2004	≥ 10	13,578,032	450,690	3.32	
Zambia	2022	≥ 3			2.9	(Note: 75.1% of the population aged 3 and above have attended school; of them, 3.8% attained tertiary education (at least diploma level), which yields a total attainment rate of 2.9%.)
Zimbabwe	2022	≥ 15	9,046,415	662,975	7.33	

== 2022 OECD data ==
This is a list of countries by the proportions of 25- to 64-year-olds having completed tertiary education as published by the OECD. This list includes non-OECD member countries: Argentina, Brazil, China, Costa Rica, India, Indonesia, and South Africa.

Educational attainment amongst OECD countries (Age 25-64)
Country	Tertiary (%)	Upper secondary or post-secondary non-tertiary (%)	Below upper secondary (%)
India	12.95	9.31	77.74
China	18.54	18.09	63.37
Indonesia	13.06	29.68	57.26
Mexico	20.64	23.15	56.22
Costa Rica	25.34	19.75	54.91
South Africa	13.91	31.35	54.73
Turkey	25.00	21.67	53.33
Brazil	20.97	38.09	40.94
Portugal	31.48	28.87	39.65
Colombia	28.27	33.85	37.87
Italy	20.32	42.72	36.96
Spain	41.11	23.07	35.82
Argentina	24.77	41.78	33.46
Chile	31.44	40.53	28.03
Romania	19.67	57.25	23.08
Iceland	43.56	34.24	22.20
OECD average	40.44	40.23	19.75
Greece	35.10	45.17	19.72
New Zealand	39.84	41.12	19.04
Luxembourg	51.49	29.55	18.96
Netherlands	44.66	36.58	18.76
United Kingdom	51.32	30.12	18.56
Denmark	42.08	39.71	18.20
Belgium	45.77	36.67	17.56
Norway	48.10	34.54	17.36
France	41.64	41.66	16.70
EU	37.67	45.74	16.59
Germany	32.52	51.02	16.46
Bulgaria	29.78	54.22	16.00
Australia	51.50	33.74	14.76
Sweden	48.53	37.09	14.37
Austria	35.55	50.39	14.05
Switzerland	44.70	41.37	13.94
Hungary	29.41	57.61	12.98
Ireland	54.39	33.25	12.37
Israel	50.62	37.57	11.82
Finland	42.64	46.47	10.89
Latvia	39.47	49.71	10.82
Estonia	42.10	47.72	10.18
Slovenia	40.11	50.93	8.96
South Korea	52.80	38.43	8.77
United States	50.02	41.82	8.16
Lithuania	46.53	46.39	7.08
Canada	62.74	30.42	6.84
Poland	33.92	59.55	6.53
Slovakia	29.22	64.28	6.50
Czech Republic	26.67	67.78	5.55

== 2019 OECD data ==
Tertiary education attainment by age group

This list includes non-OECD member countries: Brazil, China, Costa Rica, Indonesia, Russia, Saudi Arabia, and South Africa.

Country	Age 25–64 (%)	Age				Year	Non-OECD
Country	Age 25–64 (%)	25–34 (%)	35–44 (%)	45–54 (%)	55–64 (%)	Year	Non-OECD
Australia	42	48	46	38	33	2014	
Austria	30	38	33	27	21	2014	
Belgium	37	44	42	34	26	2014	
Brazil	14	15	14	14	11	2013	
Canada	54	58	61	51	45	2014	
Chile	36	38	34	28	26	2014	
China	60	65	47	25	10	2024	
Colombia	22	28	23	18	16	2014	
Costa Rica	18	21	19	17	17	2014	
Czech Republic	22	30	21	20	16	2014	
Denmark	36	42	41	33	29	2014	
Estonia	38	40	39	35	36	2014	
Finland	42	40	50	44	34	2014	
France	32	44	39	26	20	2013	
Germany	27	28	29	26	25	2014	
Greece	28	39	27	26	21	2014	
Hungary	23	32	25	20	17	2014	
Iceland	37	41	42	36	29	2014	
Indonesia	12	16	9	8	4	2018	
Ireland	41	51	49	34	24	2014	
Israel	49	46	53	48	47	2014	
Italy	17	24	19	13	12	2014	
Japan	48	59	53	47	35	2014	
Latvia	30	39	31	27	23	2014	
Lithuania	37	53	38	30	28	2014	
Luxembourg	46	53	56	40	32	2014	
Mexico	19	25	17	16	13	2014	
Netherlands	34	44	38	30	27	2014	
New Zealand	36	40	41	32	29	2014	
Norway	42	49	49	36	32	2014	
Poland	27	43	32	18	14	2014	
Portugal	22	31	26	17	13	2014	
Russia	54	58	55	53	50	2013	
Saudi Arabia	22	26	22	18	14	2013	
Slovakia	20	30	21	15	14	2014	
Slovenia	29	38	35	24	18	2014	
South Africa	7	5	7	8	7	2012	
South Korea	45	68	56	33	17	2014	
Spain	35	41	43	30	21	2014	
Sweden	39	46	46	32	30	2014	
Switzerland	40	46	45	38	31	2014	
Turkey	17	25	16	10	10	2014	
Taiwan	45	X	X	X	X	2015	
United Kingdom	42	49	46	38	35	2014	
United States	44	46	47	43	41	2014	

== Countries by level of tertiary education ==
This is a list of countries by the level of tertiary education completed by 25–64 year olds as of the year 2022.

	Short-cycle tertiary	Bachelor's or equivalent	Master's or equivalent	Doctoral or equivalent	Total
Australia	12	29	9	2	51
Austria	15	6	14	1	36
Belgium	1	25	19	1	46
Canada	26	24	12		63
Chile	10	19	2		31
Colombia		28			28
Costa Rica	7	16	3		25
Czech Republic	0	7	19	1	27
Denmark	5	21	15	2	42
Estonia	6	15	21	1	42
Finland	8	18	16	1	43
France	14	12	14	1	42
Germany	1	18	12	2	33
Greece	0	25	8	1	35
Hungary	1	15	13	0	29
Iceland	4	21	17	1	44
Ireland	10	28	15	2	54
Israel	11	24	14	1	51
Italy	0	6	14	1	20
Japan	21	35			56
Korea	15	34	4		53
Latvia	4	17	18	0	39
Lithuania		30	16	1	47
Luxembourg	5	15	29	3	51
Mexico	1	18	2	0	21
Netherlands	2	24	17	1	45
New Zealand	4	30	5	1	40
Norway	12	21	14	1	48
Poland	0	8	25	1	34
Portugal	0	10	21	1	31
Slovakia	0	4	24	1	29
Slovenia	8	12	16	4	40
Spain	13	11	16	1	41
Sweden	10	20	17	2	49
Switzerland		25	17	3	45
Turkey	7	16	2	0	25
United Kingdom	9	26	14	2	51
United States	11	25	12	2	50

== See also ==
- Education by country
- List of universities and colleges by country
- List of countries by secondary education attainment
