= Aishah Ahmad =

Nigerian accountant (born 1976)

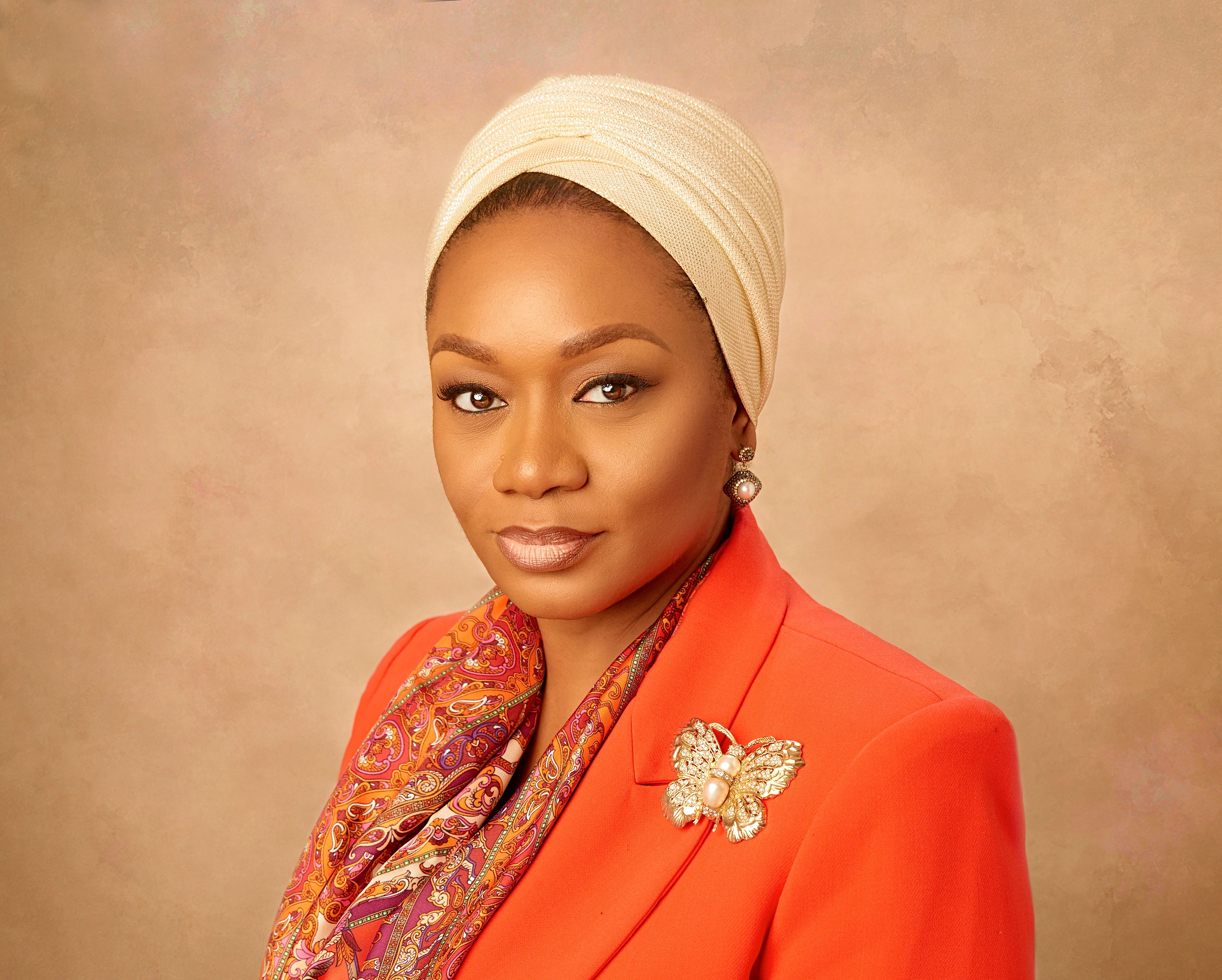
- Ahmad in 2022

Deputy Governor of the Central Bank of Nigeria (Financial System Stability)
- In office 23 March 2018 – 13 September 2023
- Governor: Godwin Emefiele; Folashodun Shonubi (Acting)
- Preceded by: Sarah Alade

Personal details
- Born: 26 October 1976 (age 50) Lagos, Nigeria
- Citizenship: Nigeria
- Spouse: Abdallah A. Ahmad
- Education: Federal Government Girls College Bida; University of Abuja; University of Lagos; Cranfield School of Management

Aishah Ndanusa Ahmad (born 26 October 1976) is a Nigerian accountant and finance professional. She is a former deputy governor of the Central Bank of Nigeria having been appointed on 6 October 2017, replacing Sarah Alade, who retired in March 2017. She was confirmed by the Nigerian Senate on 22 March 2018. On 6 December 2022, Ahmad was reappointed deputy governor for a second five-year term and subsequently confirmed by the Senate on 14 December 2022. However, on 15 September 2023, she was removed from office by President Bola Tinubu alongside three other deputy governors for alleged corporate governance failures at the Central Bank of Nigeria.

== Background and education ==
Ahmad was born in Lagos, to a Nupe Muslim family from Bida, on 26 October 1976. She attended St. Catherine's Primary School, Surulere Lagos, and Zarumai Primary School, Minna Niger State, before proceeding to Federal Government Girls’ College, Bida, for her secondary education. Ahmad graduated with a BSc degree in Accounting from the University of Abuja and went on to obtain an MBA in Finance from the University of Lagos and an MSc in Finance and Management from the Cranfield School of Management. She is an INSEAD Certified Board Director and a recipient of the Economic Development Certificate from the Harvard Kennedy School. She is also a Chartered Alternative Investment Analyst (CAIA) and a Chartered Financial Analyst (CFA) charterholder.

== Career ==
Prior to her appointment at the Central Bank of Nigeria in 2018, Ahmad was an accomplished banker, investment manager, financial expert and corporate executive, having served as Executive Director of Retail Banking at Diamond Bank Plc.

Ahmad started out in the private sector as an auditor at Z.O. Ososanya & Company, and then as Chief Financial Officer at Manstructs Group Ltd.

Her banking career started in 2001 at First Interstate Bank (Nigeria) Plc., where she was recruited as Executive Assistant, Treasury Group, after which she proceeded to NAL Bank Plc as Head of Private Banking where she worked till 2005. Later, she was Head of Retail Banking (Energy Group) and Group Head (Asset Management Business Development) at Zenith Bank Group. From 2009 until 2014, she served in various capacities at Stanbic IBTC Bank Plc including as Head, Private Clients/High Net Worth Individuals, before leaving for Diamond Bank to lead its retail business. She retired as Executive Director of Retail Banking at Diamond Bank Plc following her appointment to the CBN. Other assignments in the past have included stints at the Bank of New York Mellon and at Synesix Financial Limited.

Ahmad served as Chairperson of the Board for SOS Children's Villages, an independent, non-governmental, nonprofit international development organization she has volunteered for since 2017. She also served as the chairperson of the executive council of Women in Management, Business and Public Service (WIMBIZ), a Nigerian non-profit organization where she was part of the establishment in 2001.

Ahmad was the Deputy Governor for Financial System Stability at the Central Bank of Nigeria. She was a member of the CBN Governing Board, Monetary Policy Committee, Financial System Stability Committee and the Committee of Governors. She also served as Chairperson of the boards of Nigeria Inter-Bank Settlement System (NIBSS), the Nigeria Commodity Exchange (NCX) and the Financial Institutions Training Centre (FITC).

=== Polaris Bank sale ===
In December 2022, the Peoples Gazette claimed that Ahmad helped facilitate the sale of Polaris Bank at a favorable price in order to be considered for the position of Governor of the Central Bank of Nigeria (CBN). The CBN denied these allegations and asserted that the sale of Polaris Bank was an institutional decision supervised by a committee of senior representatives of Asset Management Corporation of Nigeria (AMCON) and the CBN. The divestment was also coordinated with outside legal and financial advisers and approved by the leadership and boards of Polaris Bank and the purchaser, Strategic Capital Investment Limited. The CBN stated that no other party made a higher purchase offer as alleged by the Peoples Gazette. On 10 September 2023, newspapers widely reported that Ahmad was arrested by Nigeria's secret police for her role in the Polaris Bank sale. However, some other newspapers reported that she was not under arrest. On 15 September 2023, few days after the arrest claims and rebuttals, Ahmad and her co-Deputy Governors, Edward Adamu, Kingsley Obiora and Folashodun Shonubi were removed from office.

== Personal life ==
Ahmad is married to Abdallah A. Ahmad, a retired Brigadier General in the Nigerian Army and they have two children.

== See also ==
- Economy of Nigeria
- Central Bank of Nigeria
- Godwin Emefiele
- Edward Lametek Adamu
- List of banks in Nigeria
- Monique Nsanzabaganwa
