= Sarah Alade =

Nigerian economist

Sarah Alade OON

Governor of the Central Bank of Nigeria
- Acting
- In office 20 February 2014 – 3 June 2014
- President: Goodluck Jonathan
- Preceded by: Sanusi Lamido Sanusi
- Succeeded by: Godwin Emefiele

Deputy Governor of the Central Bank of Nigeria (Economic Policy)
- In office 26 March 2007 – 22 March 2017
- Governor: Charles Soludo; Sanusi Lamido Sanusi; Godwin Emefiele
- Succeeded by: Aishah Ahmad

Personal details
- Born: Offa, Kwara State, Nigeria
- Education: University of Ife (BSc (Hons)); University of Melbourne (MComm); University of Ilorin (PhD)
- Profession: Economist

Sarah Omotunde Alade OON is a Nigerian economist. She was acting governor of the Central Bank of Nigeria during the suspension of Sanusi Lamido Sanusi. She was appointed to the post by president Goodluck Jonathan on 20th of February 2014. She held this position until the appointment of Godwin Emefiele in June 2014. She served as deputy governor (Economic Policy), Central Bank of Nigeria from 26 March 2007 to 22 March 2017.

== Education ==
Alade attended the University of Ife, Ile-Ife where she obtained a B.Sc (Hons) degree in Economics in 1976. She also obtained an M.Comm degree at the University of Melbourne, Australia in 1983 and a PhD Management Science (Operations Research), from the University of Ilorin in 1991.

== Career ==
Alade commenced her working career in 1977 with the Ministry of Finance and Economic Development, Ilorin, Kwara State. In 1991, she joined the University of Ilorin as a lecturer in the Department of Accounting and Finance. She joined the Central Bank of Nigeria in 1993 as an assistant director in the Research Department, where she served as head of the State Government Finance Office (1993–96), head of the Federal Government Finance Office (1996–2000) and head of the Fiscal Analysis Division (2000–04).

Alade has served on the teams on major economic policy studies land has been involved in the preparation of Central Bank of Nigeria's monetary and credit policy proposals over the years. She was actively involved in the drafting of the Medium Term Economic Programme (MTP) for Nigeria and the IMF staff Monitored Programme/Standby Arrangement.

Alade was present as deputy governor when it was announced that five Nigerian bank CEOs were being dismissed on 13 August 2009. Five replacements were named by the Central Bank of Nigeria with immediate effect including Olufunke Iyabo Osibodu to lead the Union Bank of Nigeria and Suzanne Iroche who took over as CEO of FinBank.

Alade was appointed director of the Banking Operations Department in May 2004. In that capacity, she served as chairman of the board of directors of the Nigeria Interbank Settlement System (NIBSS) as well as secretary of the National Payments System Committee (NPSC).

Alade was a member of the technical committee of the Vision 2010 and currently a member of the technical committee of Vision 2020 and member of the National Economic Management Team (EMT).

As deputy governor of Economic Policy, Alade superintends over the Economic Policy Directorate, comprising the Research, Monetary Policy, Trade and Exchange, Statistics Departments and Financial Markets Department. As chair of the Monetary Policy Implementation Committee (MPIC), she interfaces with operational departments and coordinates technical inputs for the Monetary Policy Committee (MPC). Alade, who is a member of the Nigerian Economic Society (NES), has several publications to her credit and is currently carrying out research into interest rate policy and monetary policy implementation in Nigeria. Alade is a fellow of the Nigerian Institute of Operational Research.

Alade served as acting governor from February 2014 until Godwin Emefiele took over in June 2014. She retired from the Central Bank of Nigeria as deputy governor after 24 years of service on 22 March 2017. In November 2019, President Muhammadu Buhari appointed Alade as his Special Adviser on Finance and Economy.
