= FCMB =

FCMB may refer to:

- First City Monument Bank, Nigerian bank
- FC Montceau Bourgogne, French football club
