= Polaris Bank Limited =

Nigerian commercial Bank

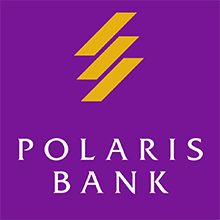
- Type: Privately owned commercial bank
- Industry: Financial services
- Founded: September 24, 2018; 7 years ago
- Headquarters: 3 Akin Adesola Street; Victoria Island, Lagos, Lagos State, Nigeria
- Key people: Kassim Gidado (chairman); Kayode Lawal (CEO)
- Products: Banking; Financial services
- Parent: Polaris Bank Limited
- Website: polarisbanklimited.com

Polaris Bank Limited is a commercial bank based in Nigeria. It is licensed by the Central Bank of Nigeria, the country's banking regulator. In October 2022, the bank was acquired by Strategic Capital Investment Limited.

== Overview ==
Polaris Bank is a large financial services provider in West Africa and Central Africa with headquarters in Nigeria. As of September 2010, the bank's total assets were valued in excess of US$3.9 billion (NGN:611.5 billion), with shareholders' equity of approximately US$630 million (NGN:98.4 billion).

== History ==
The bank traces its origins back to 1989 when Prudent Bank Plc., was incorporated as a limited liability company. In 1990, the bank was issued a license as merchant Bank. That same year, it re-branded as Prudent Merchant Bank Limited. In 2006, Prudent Merchant Bank Limited merged with four other banks to form Skye Bank Plc.:

- Bond Bank Limited
- EIB International Bank Plc.
- Reliance Bank Limited
- Co-operative Bank Plc.

In May 2021, the bank introduced launched VULTe, its digital banking platform. The bank also offers Internet banking and mobile banking. In 2014, the bank acquired Mainstreet Bank Limited.

== Ownership ==
On 21 September 2018, Godwin Emefiele, the governor of the Central Bank of Nigeria, announced in Lagos that the apex bank had revoked the operating licence of Skye Bank. He also stated that the assets and liabilities of the bank would be taken over by a new entity, Polaris Bank, due to the inability of the Skye Bank's shareholders to adequately recapitalise the bank after the 2016 intervention.

In August 2022, management of Polaris Bank denied reports that the bank was being sold to Auwal Lawan Abdullah, a relative of Ibrahim Babangida.

On 20 October 2022, the Central Bank of Nigeria (CBN) and the Asset Management Corporation of Nigeria (AMCON) announced the sale of 100 per cent of the equity in Polaris Bank to Strategic Capital Investment Limited, which paid an upfront consideration of N50billion (approximately US$115 million). They also agreed to pay N1.305 trillion (approx. US$3 billion) in bonds that CBN and AMCON had injected into Polaris. As a result of this transaction, CBN and AMCON recovered all the capital that had been injected into Polaris since 2018.

On January 10, 2024, the regulatory Central Bank of Nigeria dissolved the board and management of Polaris Bank and appointed Kayode Lawal as the new chief executive officer.

== Branch network ==
Polaris Bank Limited maintains an interlinked branch network of over 260 branches in all parts of Nigeria. The bank maintains her headquarters at 3 Akin Adesola Street, Victoria Island, Lagos, Lagos State, Nigeria.

== Governance ==
Effective 2016, the chairman of the board is M. K. Ahmad, who chaired the 16-member board of directors. The chief executive officer and group managing director was Innocent Ike, appointed in September 2020.

Following the acquisition by Strategic Capital in October 2022, Adekunle Sonola became the chief executive officer.

On January 10, 2024, the regulatory Central Bank of Nigeria (CBN) dissolved the board and management of Polaris Bank and appointed Omokayode Lawal as the new chief executive officer.

== Awards ==
In 2023, it was named the Best Digital Bank of the year for the third time at the BusinessDAY's Banks And Other Financial Institutions (BAFI) Awards in Nigeria.

The bank was awarded the Best in MSME (Micro, Small, and Medium Enterprises Lending) at the MSME Finance Awards 2024 (which was the first of its kind).

It won the "Best Bank for MSMEs" at the BusinessDAY's Banks and other Financial Institutions (BAFI) Awards in Nigeria.

== See also ==
- Economy of Nigeria
- List of banks in Nigeria
- List of banks in Africa
