= Mustafa Chike-Obi =

Nigerian banker and business executive

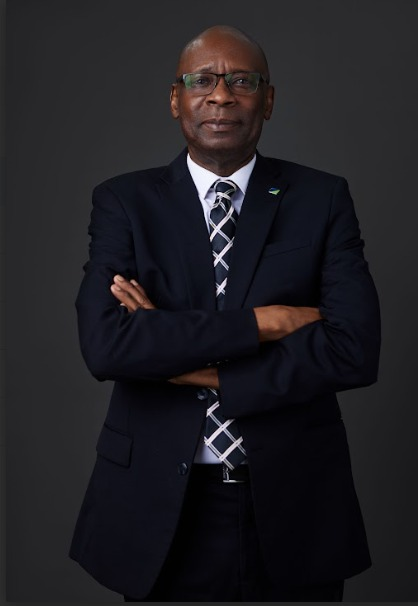
- Chike-Obi
- Education: University of Lagos; Stanford Graduate School of Business
- Occupations: Banker, investment banker, business executive
- Known for: Former Chairman of Fidelity Bank Nigeria

Mustafa Chike-Obi is a Nigerian banker, investment banker and business executive. He is the former Chairman of Fidelity Bank Nigeria and served as the inaugural Managing Director and Chief Executive Officer of the Asset Management Corporation of Nigeria (AMCON) from 2010 to 2015.

== Early life and education ==
Chike-Obi obtained a first-class Bachelor's degree in Mathematics from the University of Lagos. He later earned a Master of Business Administration (MBA) from the Stanford Graduate School of Business.

== Career ==
Chike-Obi began his banking career at Chase Merchant Bank in Nigeria, where he worked between 1980 and 1982. He later joined international investment banks including Goldman Sachs and Bear Stearns, working in fixed-income and emerging markets trading.

He subsequently founded Madison Park Advisors, a New Jersey-based financial advisory firm specialising in hedge funds and private equity investments. He also served as Managing Director of Shoreline Group before returning to Nigeria.

In 2010, Chike-Obi was appointed the pioneer Managing Director and Chief Executive Officer of the Asset Management Corporation of Nigeria (AMCON), the government-owned asset management company established to acquire non-performing loans from Nigerian banks following the global financial crisis.

Following the completion of his tenure at AMCON in 2015, he became Executive Vice Chairman of Alpha African Advisory Limited.

Chike-Obi was appointed Chairman of the Board of Fidelity Bank Nigeria in July 2020, and finished his term on December 2025.

He has also served as President of the Bank Directors Association of Nigeria (BDAN) and Chairman of the Anambra State Investment Promotion and Protection Agency (ANSIPPA).
