= Edward Lametek Adamu =

Nigerian civil servant (born 22 June 1959)

Deputy Governor of the Central Bank of Nigeria
- In office 1 February 2018 – 13 September 2023
- Appointed by: Muhammadu Buhari
- Preceded by: Suleiman Barau

Personal details
- Born: 22 June 1959 (age 67) Kaltungo, Gombe State, Nigeria
- Citizenship: Nigeria
- Children: 4
- Education: Ahmadu Bello University; Nigerian Institute of Quantity Surveyors; Institute of Credit Administration of Nigeria; Wharton Business School; INSEAD; Booth School of Business; IMD Switzerland
- Occupation: Central Banker

Edward Lametek Adamu (born 22 June 1959) is a Nigerian quantity surveyor, business consultant, and leadership strategist who served as the Deputy Governor of the Central Bank of Nigeria. He was nominated for the position by president Muhammadu Buhari on 1 February 2018, to replace Suleiman Barau, who retired in December 2017. He was unanimously confirmed by the Nigerian Senate on 22 March 2018.

Immediately prior to his appointment as a Deputy Governor, he served as the Director of Human Resources at the Central bank of Nigeria, since 2016. Adamu also served as the Chairman of Asset Management Company of Nigeria (AMCON).

He was the deputy governor under the former governor Godwin Emefiele until his suspension. On 15 September 2023, a major news articles in Nigeria claimed that all deputy governors of the CBN mainly Folashodun Shonubi, Aishah Ahmad, Edward Lametek Adamu and Kingsley Obiora were removed from office alongside their principal, Godwin Emefiele by President Bola Ahmed Tinubu.

== Early life and education ==
Adamu was born on 22 June 1959 in Kaltungo, Gombe State, in the northeastern part of Nigeria. He studied at the Ahmadu Bello University, in Zaria, graduating with a Bachelor of Science in Quantity Surveying. He also holds postgraduate professional qualifications from other institutions of higher learning, including the Institute of Credit Administration of Nigeria, the Wharton School, INSEAD, Booth School of Business and IMD Switzerland. He is also a fellow of the Nigerian Institute of Quantity Surveyors.

== Career ==
Adamu was first employed at the Central Bank of Nigeria (CBN), in 1992. In 2012, he was appointed Director of the Strategy Management Department at the central bank. During the intervening years, he served in many roles and in many departments at CBN, including Knowledge Management, Records Management, Strategic Alliance and Price Intelligence. He also served as the head of the Projects Planning & Implementation Division.

In 2016, Adamu was appointed Director of Human Resources at CBN, a position he occupied prior to his appointment as CBN Deputy Governor.

On 9 December, 2019, President Muhammadu Buhari nominated Adamu as the Chairman of Asset Management Corporation of Nigeria (AMCON), a role he took over from Muiz Banire.

On 13 September 2023, President Bola Tinubu terminated the appointment of Adamu along with the management of the CBN following his nomination of an entirely new management team for the Bank.

== Personal life ==
Adamu is married and has four children (two sons and two daughters).

== See also ==
- Aishah Ahmad
- Godwin Emefiele
- Muhammad Bima Enagi
- List of banks in Nigeria
