= Mainstreet Bank Limited =

- Type: Private
- Industry: Financial services
- Predecessor: Afribank
- Founded: 2011
- Headquarters: Lagos, Nigeria
- Key people: Faith Tuedor-Matthews; Managing Director & CEO
- Products: Loans, Checking, Savings, Investments, Debit Cards, Credit Cards
- Website: mainstreetbanklimited.com

Mainstreet Bank Limited (MBL), also referred to as Mainstreet Bank, was a commercial bank in Nigeria. It was acquired by Skye Bank Plc in 2014.

== Overview ==
Mainstreet Microfinance Bank is a large financial services provider in Nigeria. Mainstreet Bank Limited assumed the assets and liabilities of Afribank Plc., which had an epochal beginning as one of the big four banks in Nigeria, on 20 October 1959.

The bank has been an active player in the Nigerian interbank market and has become a distinguished commercial bank in the country.

Currently, the bank operates 217 branches nationwide, with at least one branch in every city of the 36 states in the Nigerian federation

== History ==
Mainstreet Microfinance Bank was formed in August 2011 by taking over the assets and some of the liabilities of the now defunct Afribank Plc., whose commercial banking license was revoked. MBL was issued a commercial banking license on 5 August 2011.

In 2014, Skye Bank won the bid to acquire the 100 per cent ownership stake of Asset Management Corporation of Nigeria (AMCON) in Mainstreet Bank Limited.

== Ownership ==
As of January 2012, the assets of Mainstreet Bank Limited are 100% owned by Asset Management Company of Nigeria (AMCON), an arm of the Federal Government of Nigeria.

== Subsidiaries ==
The bank maintains the following subsidiaries:

1. Mainstreet Bank Insurance Brokers Limited - Founded in 1988 (100% shareholding)
2. Mainstreet Bank Securities Brokers Limited - Founded in 1994 (100% shareholding)
3. Mainstreet Bank Microfinance Bank Limited - Founded in 2009 (100% shareholding)
4. Mainstreet Bank Trustees & Asset Management Company Limited - Founded in 1991 (100% shareholding)
5. Mainstreet Bank Registrars - Founded in 2004 (100% shareholding)
6. Mainstreet Bank Capital Markets - (100% shareholding)
7. Mainstreet Bank Estate Company Limited (100% shareholding)
8. Mainstreet Bank Bureau De Change Limited (100% shareholding)
9. ANP International Finance Limited - Founded in 1987 (100% shareholding)

== Branch network ==
As of June 2012, Mainstreet Microfinance Bank maintains a network of over 13 branches in all regions of Lagos states of Nigeria.

== Governance ==
The Managing Director and Chief Executive Officer of the bank is Adegoke Elijah Adegbami.

== See also ==
- List of banks in Nigeria
- Central Bank of Nigeria
- Economy of Nigeria
- Afribank
