= Tertiary education =

Third stage of education for adults

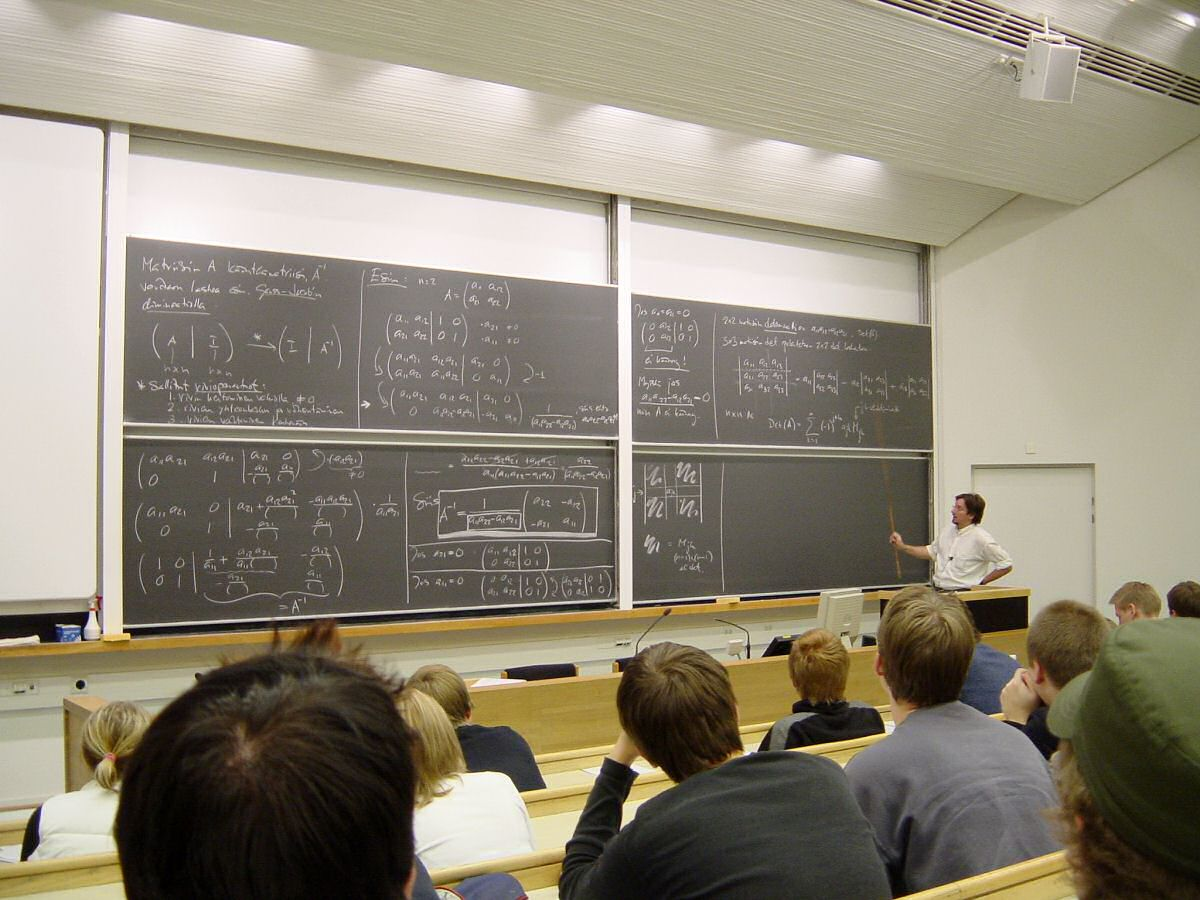
Students attend a linear algebra lecture at a tertiary institution: Helsinki University of Technology in Finland.

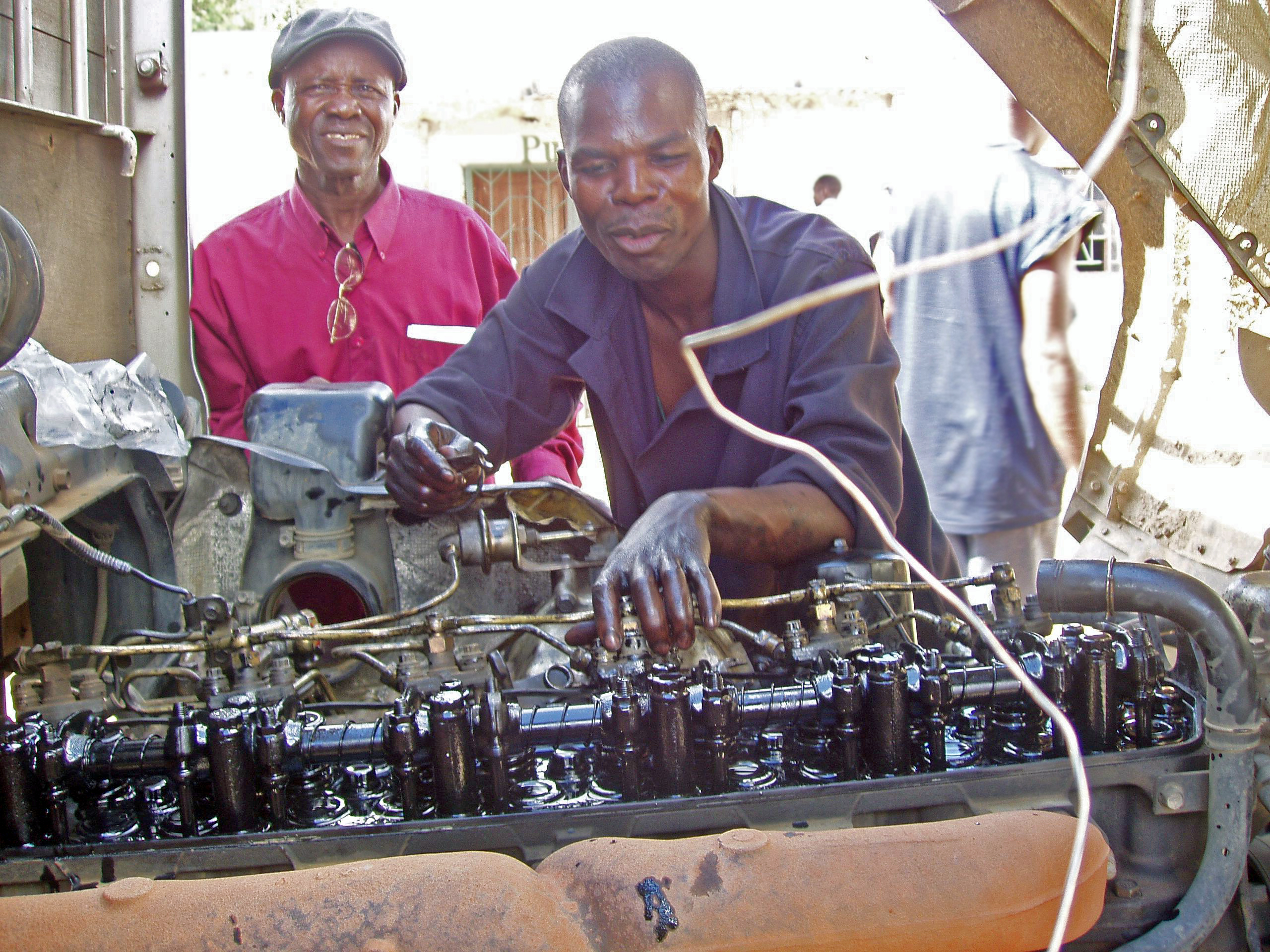
A student learning about automotive repair at the Chawama Youth Resource Centre in Lusaka, Zambia

Tertiary education is a stage of education following compulsory education. Depending on the definition used it may include all post-compulsory education, including that delivered at secondary schools, all post-secondary education, or be a synonym for higher education. Historically, it has covered education between the end of compulsory schooling and the start of higher education (then referred to as post-tertiary education). Tertiary education may be defined by life-stage as including adult education at all educational levels, including basic skills education, or may be defined by educational level as only including education at the higher education level.

Tertiary education may culminate in the receipt of certificates, diplomas, or academic degrees, or may be lifelong learning that does not result in formal certification. Higher education is taken to include undergraduate and postgraduate education, representing levels 5, 6, 7, and 8 of the 2011 version of the International Standard Classification of Education (ISCED) structure, while vocational education beyond secondary education is known as further education in the United Kingdom, or included under the category of continuing education in the United States.

UNESCO has stated that tertiary education focuses on learning endeavours in specialised fields. It includes academic and higher vocational education. The World Bank's 2019 World Development Report on the future of work argues that, given the future of work and the increasing role of technology in value chains, tertiary education is becoming even more relevant for workers to compete in the labor market.

== Definitions ==
Tertiary education has a number of definitions. It may include all post-compulsory education, including that delivered at secondary schools, all post-secondary education, or be a synonym for higher education. Historically, it has covered education between the end of compulsory schooling and the start of higher education (then referred to as post-tertiary education), but is normally now taken to also include higher education. Tertiary education may be defined by life-stage as including adult education at all educational levels, including basic skills education, or may be defined by educational level as only including education at the higher education level.

While tertiary education is sometimes used as a synonym for higher education, the two terms are distinct. In an international context, tertiary education takes in technical and vocational education and training as well as higher education. Various other definitions are used in specific countries.

In the ISCED, tertiary education is used as an educational level, rather than an educational stage, to refer to education at ISCED levels 5, 6, 7 and 8. This takes in academic education as well as degree-level technical and professional education. This is synonymous with the definition for higher education as "Education at ISCED level 5 or above".

== Components ==
There are multiple, overlapping components to tertiary education, not all of which are included in all definitions of tertiary education.

=== Higher education ===
Higher education covers tertiary education at degree level.

=== Technical and vocational education and training ===
Technical and vocational education and training (TVET), also known as vocational education and training, technical and vocational skills development, further education and training, and technical and further education, includes formal education at colleges, apprenticeships, and lifelong learning. The defining feature is the orientation towards employment, and the educational may be at secondary, post-secondary or degree-level.

=== Adult education ===
Tertiary education can include post-compulsory lifelong learning or adult education at all educational levels, sometimes known as continuing education, recurrent education, or second chance education.

== Countries with tertiary systems ==
Countries that have organised tertiary education systems, rather than having separate systems for higher education, vocational education, etc., include:

=== Australia ===
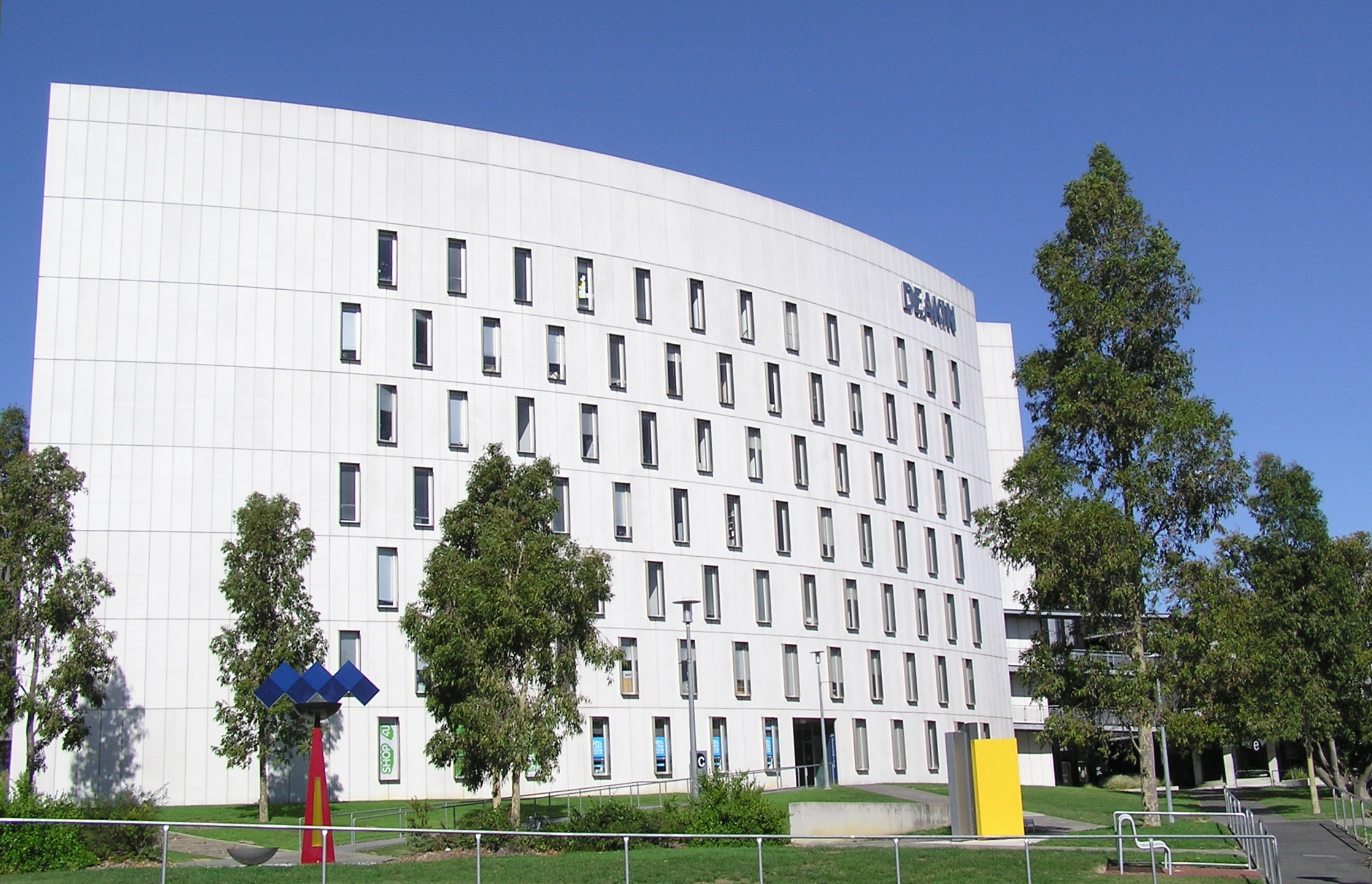
Deakin University, one of Australia's 43 universities

Within Australia, "tertiary education" refers to continuing studies after a student completes secondary school. Tertiary education options include universities, technical and further education (TAFE) and private universities.

=== Ireland ===
In Ireland, policy since the 2020s has promoted a more unified tertiary system linking further education and higher education. In 2022, the National Tertiary Office was established within the Higher Education Authority and jointly managed by the HEA and SOLAS to develop joint further-and-higher education degree programmes.

=== New Zealand ===
Tertiary education in New Zealand includes all post-secondary education and is overseen by the Tertiary Education Commission. The tertiary sector includes universities, polytechnics, institutes of technology, the New Zealand Institute of Skills and Technology, wānanga, and other training establishments. This includes academic education at degree level (primarily in universities), vocational degree-level education, and lower level vocational education.

=== United Kingdom ===
Under devolution in the United Kingdom, education is administered separately in England, Wales, Northern Ireland, and Scotland. Prior to devolution, a national system of tertiary colleges was proposed for 16–19 education in 1980 to replace other post-compulsory education providers and to be the sole providers of both vocational (traditionally provided by further education colleges) and academic (traditionally provided by school sixth forms and sixth form colleges) further education in an area. However, the initial recommendation was watered down by the government of the time and implementation was left to local authorities to decide.

==== Wales ====
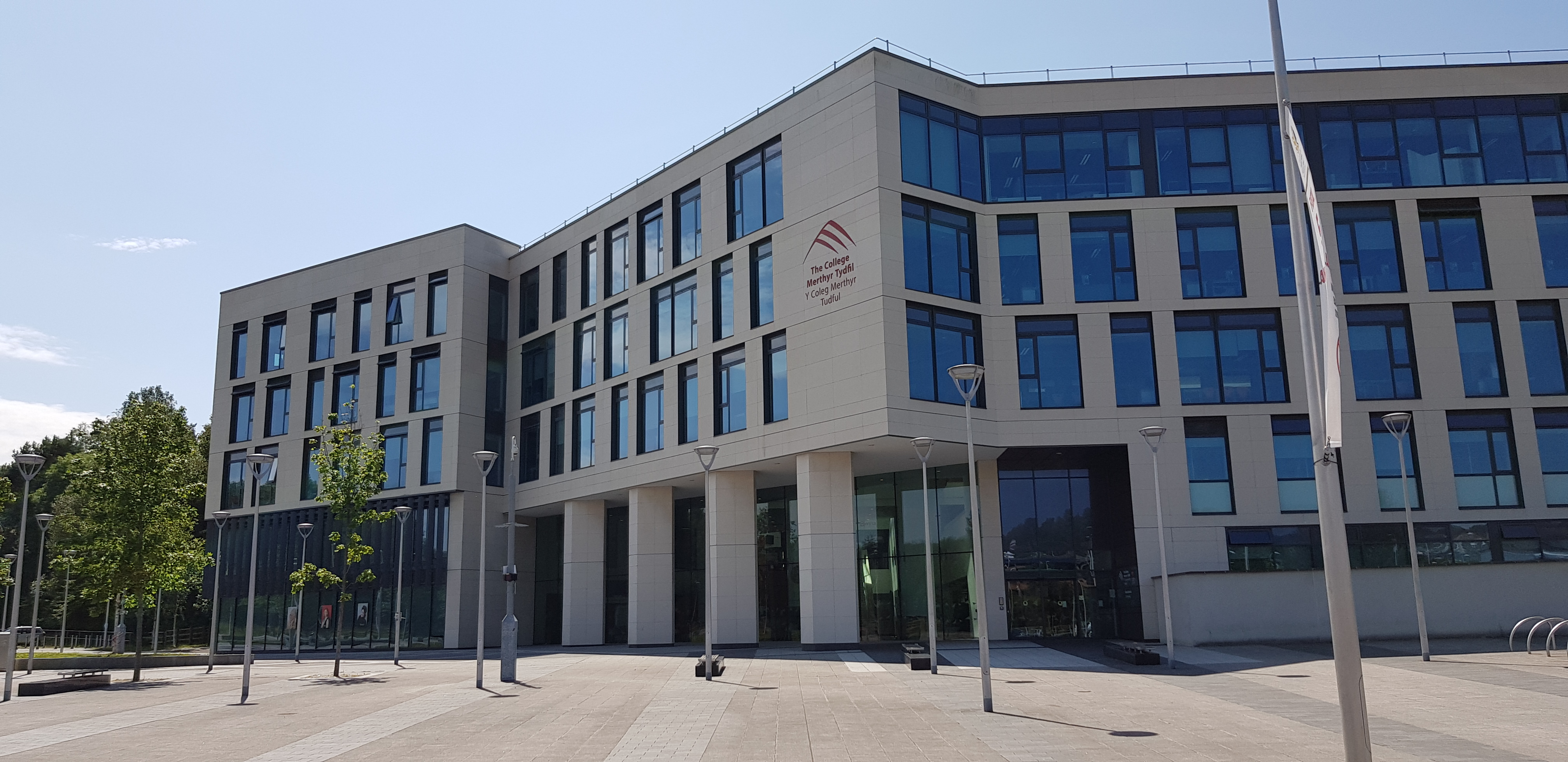
Merthyr Tydfil College, a further education college in south Wales

Since at least 2016, the Welsh Government has formally used the term "tertiary education" to refer to post-16 education and training in Wales, including post-16 education delivered within secondary schools. The Tertiary Education and Research (Wales) Act 2022. established Medr, the Commission for Tertiary Education and Research. The remit of Medr includes all five parts of the tertiary sector in Wales: further education, higher education (including research and innovation), apprenticeships, adult community learning, and school sixth forms.

== See also ==
- List of countries by tertiary education attainment
- List of education articles by country
