= Yemisi Edun =

Nigerian banker and business executive

- Edun in 2026

Managing Director/Chief Executive Officer First City Monument Bank
- Incumbent
- Assumed office 13 July 2021
- Preceded by: Adam Nuhu

Personal details
- Education: Obafemi Awolowo University; University of Liverpool
- Profession: Banker

Yemisi Edun is the managing director/chief executive officer of First City Monument Bank, the first woman to ever hold the position. She assumed this position in July 2021 after the suspension of Adam Nuhu.

== Education ==
Yemisi Edun graduated with a bachelor's degree in chemistry from the University of Ife. She proceeded to the University of Liverpool, where she graduated with a master's degree in international accounting and finance. Until her appointment as managing director, she was the chief financial officer of the bank and the acting chief executive officer. Edun is a fellow of the Institute of Chartered Accountants of Nigeria and a CFA holder. She is also an associate member of the Chartered Institute of Stock brokers, an Associate Member of the Chartered Institute of Taxation of Nigeria, and a member of the Information Systems Audit and Control.

== Awards and recognition ==
Yemisi Edun was named Banker of the year 2023 by Leadership Newspaper following her contributions to steer First City Monument Bank (FCMB) towards SME financing and earning the bank international recognition for its role in facilitating credit to small businesses.
