= Afribank =

Afri Bank PLC was a commercial banking, real estate and insurance broker based in Lagos, Nigeria. It was established by French investors in 1959 under the name Banque Internationale pour l'Afrique Occidentale (BAIO). As at 2010, the bank operated over 250 branches across Nigeria, and was one of the region's "Big Four" banks. Afribank used the Temenos Globus banking application in its branches.

== Operations ==
Afribank's core business was in commercial and retail investment banking. It also operated stock brokering firm, an insurance brokerage firm, a trustees and investments company, and estate development company, a capital market firm, and an offshore finance company in Dublin, Ireland. Afribank also invested in companies in the financial and real sectors of the Nigerian economy.

== Failure and closure ==
Afribank failed in 2011 and its banking license was revoked by the Central Bank of Nigeria, the national banking regulator. The assets and some of the liabilities of the now defunct Afribank Plc. were acquired by Mainstreet Bank Limited, a bridge institution, specially created for that purpose on the same day. In July 2012, the Federal High Court of Nigeria, in Lagos ordered that the affairs of the defunct Afribank Nigeria Plc be wound up, since its license had been revoked.
