= Muiz Banire =

Nigerian academic and lawyer

Personal details
- Born: 6 October 1966 (age 59) Olowogbowo, Lagos Island, Lagos state
- Spouse: Olufunmilayo Banire
- Children: 4
- Education: University of Lagos
- Occupation: Lawyer and activist
- Website: http://www.muizbanire.com

Muiz Adeyemi Banire (born 6 October 1966) is a Nigerian lawyer and activist. Banire formed the United Action For Change which serves as a pressure group and think tank with the drive to build a society where people are valued and treated equally, enjoy their rights as full citizens.

== Early life and education ==
Banire was born on 6 October 1966 in Olowogbowo, Lagos Island and attended primary and Secondary School in Mushin, Lagos. He received his LLB, Masters and Doctorates of Law from the University of Lagos focusing on the Evolving Alternative Legal Framework for Land Management in Nigeria.

== Legal career ==
Banire served his compulsory Youth Service with the Legal Aid Council and was later attached to Gani Fawehinmi Chambers before he was called to bar in 1989. He established his firm, M.A. Banire and Associates in 1995. He was a Senior Lecturer of Law at the University of Lagos from 1991 till 2010 lecturing in private and property law.

He was elevated to the rank of Senior Advocate of Nigeria in 2015 and appointed a Bencher. He was appointed to the National Judicial Council in 2017.

== Political appointments ==
Banire was appointed as Commissioner for Special Duties in Lagos State in 1999. In 2000, he was moved to head the Ministry of Transport where he served as a Commissioner till 2007 He then served as Commissioner for Environment in Lagos State from 2007 until 2011. He was nominated by President Muhammadu Buhari, and confirmed by the Nigerian Senate, to serve as Chairman of the Governing Board of the Asset Management Corporation of Nigeria (AMCON) in 2018.

== Personal life ==
He is married to Jemilat Olufunmilayo Banire. The couple have four children.
