= Beatrice Jedy-Agba =

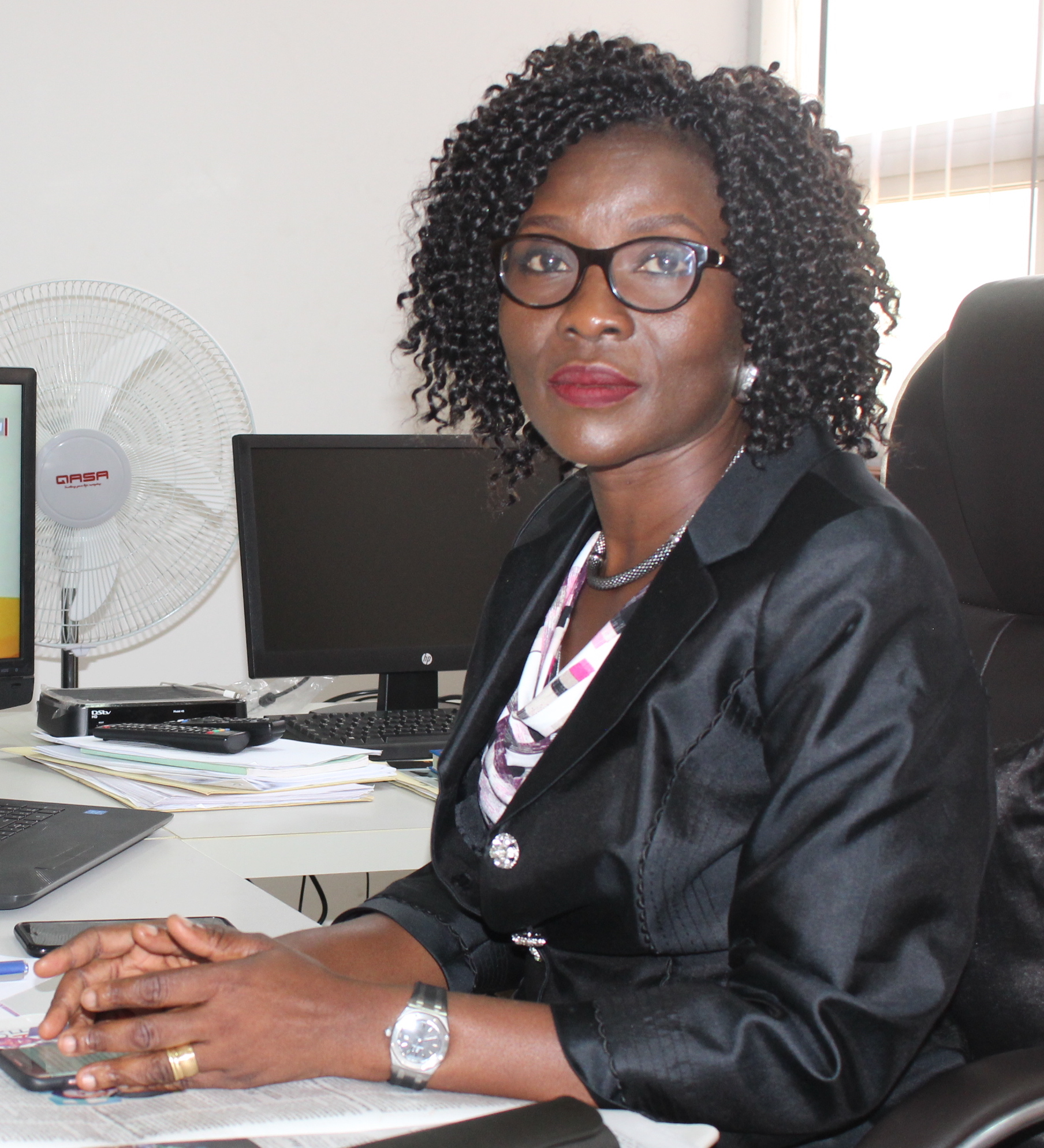

Director of Planning, Research and Statistics at Federal Ministry of Justice
- Incumbent
- Assumed office 2016
- President: Muhammadu Buhari

Director-General at National Agency for Prohibition of Trafficking in Persons
- In office 2011–2016
- President: Goodluck Jonathan
- Preceded by: Chuzi Egede
- Succeeded by: Abdulrazak Dangiri

Personal details
- Born: Lagos Edo State, Nigeria
- Education: Federal Government Girls College Bida, Bendel State University

Beatrice Jedy-Agba is a Nigerian lawyer and anti-human trafficking advocate. She is the first Nigerian to be honored by the U.S. Department of State with the Trafficking in Persons Heroes Award 2014. She was Director-General of National Agency for Prohibition of Trafficking in Persons (NAPTIP) between 2011 and 2016.

== Family ==
Jedy-Agba was born to the family of Dr.& Mrs. Eigbefoh; and the second child and first daughter to the family of 6 children. She hails from Edo State, Nigeria.

== Early life and education ==
She attended Bola Memorial Primary School Ikeja between 1975 and 1980 and Federal Government Girls College Bida, Niger State between 1980 and 1985. The young Beatrice had a passion to stand for the rights of those who are abused, and this made her to be interested in law.

She holds a bachelor's degree in law from Bendel State University, now known as Ambrose Alli University Ekpoma in 1989, from where she attended the Nigerian Law School, Lagos and was subsequently called to Bar in 1990. She did her mandatory National Youth Service Corps at the National Drug Law Enforcement Agency (NDLEA).

== Career ==
She began her career at the National Drug Law Enforcement Agency in 1992, an agency where she did her mandatory NYSC. In 2004 she transferred her service to the Federal Ministry of Justice where she served as Chief State Counsel in the International and Comparative Law Department and as Legal Adviser to National Boundary Commission. She was subsequently appointed Special Assistant to Mohammed Bello Adoke, the Attorney-General of the Federation and Minister of Justice. Her commitment and passion led to her appointment by President Goodluck Jonathan, as the Executive Secretary of National Agency for Prohibition of Trafficking in Persons (NAPTIP).

Following the amendment of the NAPTIP Act, her designation was changed to Director-General, which made her the first female Director-General of the agency. She is currently the Director of Planning, Research and Statistics at Federal Ministry of Justice.

In 2022, she was appointed as the solicitor-general of federation by President Muhammadu Buhari.

== Achievements ==
Beatrice Jedy-Agba made a tremendous impact while at National Agency for Prohibition of Trafficking in Persons(NAPTIP). She:

- Restructured NAPTIP to be among the top performing anti-human trafficking agency in the world.
- Strengthened inter-agency collaboration on the issue of trafficking in persons
- Increased awareness nationally on the scourge of human trafficking
- Strengthened partnership/cooperation with international organizations including United Nations and European Union.
- Strengthened institutional framework for combating Human trafficking in Nigeria
- Developed a strategic plan for the agency and improved
- Developed a National Referral Mechanism (NRM) on human trafficking

These earned her 2014 Trafficking in Persons Hero Award by U.S Department of State. She was described by John Kerry as a courageous Nigerian woman who has devoted her lives work to combating human trafficking.

== Awards ==
- Officer of the Order of the Niger (OON)
- Presidential Commendation on the work on improving anti-trafficking in Nigeria
- 2014 Trafficking in Persons Hero
