= Philip Ikeazor =

Nigerian banker

- Citizenship: Nigerian
- Education: University of Buckingham
- Occupation: Accountant
- Years active: 2023-date (Central Bank of Nigeria); 2013-2017 (Keystone Bank)
- Employer: Central Bank of Nigeria

Philip Chukwuemeka Ikeazor is a Nigerian banker who has served as the Deputy Governor for Financial System Stability at the Central Bank of Nigeria.

He was appointed by President Ahmed Bola Tinubu on 15 September 2023, and confirmed by the Nigerian Senate on the 26th of September, 2023.

== Education ==
Ikeazor studied for a Bachelors in Economics at the University of Buckingham, United Kingdom where he majored in financial management. He also attended the Wharton Business School Global CEO programme for Executive Education.

== Career ==
Ikeazor worked for six years as a loan officer for the Nigerian-American Merchant Bank from 1990 to 1996 and was also the pioneer Managing Director of Ecobank Kenya. He served as the director for wholesale banking at the United Bank for Africa and as a Director on the Board of Greenwich Merchant Limited, Tideway Advisory, Union Bank Nigeria, Union Registers, Union Bank UK Plc and UBA Trustees.

=== Keystone Bank ===
In 2013 he became CEO and Managing Director of Keystone Bank Limited. During his tenure at Keystone Bank, Ikeazor presided over the divestment of Orient Bank Ltd of Uganda and other African subsidiaries of Keystone Bank. His appointment as Managing Director was renewed in 2013 by the Asset Management Corporation of Nigeria(AMCON) which had acquired the bank and had appointed Ikeazor in the first instance to help turn around its fortunes. During his time as Managing Director of Keystone Bank, Ikeazor supported businesses in building digital capacity in Nigeria and worked to prevent road accidents by scaling the knowledge and capacity of drivers on Nigerian roads. He also was involved in scaling financial literacy for school children in Nigeria. Ikeazor left Keystone Bank on March 31, 2017 after his tenure lapsed.

=== Deputy governor ===
Ikeazor's role at the Central Bank of Nigeria involves supervising and regulating financial service providers in Nigeria, principally the deposit money banks(DMBs), the microfinance banks(MFBs), and other financial institutions.

He focuses on regulation and cybersecurity to tackle incidents of fraud, to protect consumers of financial services in Nigeria.
