= Amina Adamu Aliyu =

Nigerian judge (born 1964)

Justice Amina Adamu Aliyu
- Born: 15 January 1964 (age 62); Kano State
- Education: Ahmadu Bello University; Nigerian Law School
- Occupation: Judge
- Years active: 2009 to date
- Employer: National Judicial Council (Nigeria)
- Organization: High Court of Justice Kano State
- Known for: Principle
- Title: Honourable Justice
- Children: Maryam Amina, Salma Abdulahi, Halimatu Rabi Jibril, (Musa Ahmad, Adamu Ahmad)
- Parent(s): Alhaji Adamu Aliyu & Hajiya Aisha Adamu
- Relatives: Hudu Adamu Aliyu (Brother)

Amina Adamu Aliyu is a Nigerian judge from Kano State.

== Education ==
Aliyu was born in Kano Municipal Local Government Area of Kano State. She started her education in Kwalli Special Primary School, in Kano State and moved to Federal Government Girls College Bida between 1975 and 1979. Aliyu attended Ahmadu Bello University Zaria between 1982 and 1986, where she obtained a Bachelor of Laws degree. She attended Nigerian Law School and was called to bar in May 1989.

== Career ==
She was a state Counsel in the Kano State Ministry of Justice from 1989 where she rose to the position of Deputy Director Civil litigation until in 2009 when she was appointed a High Court Judge.

She was the chairperson of the election petition tribunal in Kwara State 2020 where the candidate of the People's Democratic Party filed a petition against Honourable Ahmed Adam, of the All Progressives Congress for allegations of fraud and irregularities in his name, that Adam deposed to false information in the EC9 form he submitted to the Independent National Electoral Commission after presenting all the evidence where Adam's name on the EC9 form is different from his primary school certificate, his declaration of age, his voters’ card and also in the letter he forwarded to the Independent National Electoral Commission on January 15, 2019, Justice Amina delivered a judgement based on the difference between ‘Adam’ and ‘Adama’ on the certificate of the Honourable Ahmed Adam of All Progressives Congress She nullified the election consequently declared Honourable Salihu Yahaya Mohammed, of the Peoples Democratic Party as the winner of the bye-election held in March 2020.

Also in Kebbi State she was the chairperson of the election petition tribunal 2019 Nigerian general election the case filed by the Peoples Democratic Party against the Governor of the Kebbi State, Abubakar Atiku Bagudu. challenging without the evidence that he can proved his case the court have no option than to struct out the case as the Tribunal court have limited time

in 2014 she was the presiding Judge of the case between former Governor of the Central Bank of Nigeria Sanusi Lamido Sanusi and the son of former emir of Kano Alhaji (Dr) Ado Bayero, Sanusi Ado Bayero over the Throne of Kano Emirate where informed the court that there is irregularities in the selection process as one of the kingmakers in the person of Alhaji Bello Abubakar the Sarkin Dawaki Mai Tuta was restraint from presenting himself as kingmaker by Court of Appeal in Kaduna.

She was also the presiding judge case between Government of Kano State and Mubarak Usman who was guilt of raping Ummussalama 7 years of age. Ummussalam was the first prosecution Witness she stated that "after coming from school on 25/6/2013 Mubarak held her hands and took her to a room and removed her wears and inserted something like a stone inside her. The second prosecution Witness testified that on the said 25th, she saw the Mubarak with the Ummussalama in the said room and when Mubarak saw her, he release the girl and ran away. Consequently, she informed the mother of the girl what she saw. prosecution called 6 witnesses and exhibits A-C were tendered while the Mubarak testified for himself and called a him also a witness Mubarak stated that "I could remember that on 25/6/2013 at about 12.00, while I was with my friend in person of Umar, one small girl came to pass, my friend called the girl and took her inside the waiting room of Alhaji Malam's house where put his penis inside her private part. After he finished, then I took over from him before I finish, a woman came to pass where she saw me with the girl, I released the girl, the mother of the girl went to informed my parent and also informed the girls' teacher in their school who refused to leave the issue, and reported to the police."

After hearing the evidence Justice Amina gave her judgement on 28 January 2016, Mubarak Usman was convicted and sentenced to 10 years imprisonment for the offence of rape.

She was also the presiding judge between Government of Kano State and Aliyu Bashir who was found guilt of killing his daughter, Aliyu impregnated his girlfriend Hauwa Yakubu and after she had put to birth, Aliyu was requested to come and carry his little baby Maimuna when she was sixteen days old on 14 January 2010 Aliyu and his sister went to pick the baby. Alyu ceased the opportunity of being alone with Maimuna he covered her nose and mouth with his hands until she died and he thereafter buried her at Dawakin Kudu Cemetery without anyone's knowledge. the prosecution called five witnesses and tendered two exhibits. Thereafter after hearing the witnesses Justice Amina gave her judgement on 2 June 2014, Aliyu Bashir was convicted and sentenced to death by hanging under Section 221(a) of the Penal Code of Nigeria.
