= Subomi Balogun =

Nigerian banker and philanthropist (1934–2023)

Otunba Subomi Balogun CON
- Born: Olasubomi Balogun; April 9, 1934; Ijebu-Ode, Nigeria
- Died: May 18, 2023 (aged 89); London, United Kingdom
- Education: Igbobi College; Nigerian College of Arts, Science & Technology, Ibadan (GCE Advanced Level (United Kingdom); London School of Economics and Political Science (Law)
- Occupation: Group Chairman/CEO of First City Monument Bank (1982–2023)
- Years active: 1966–2023
- Known for: Philanthropy
- Spouse: Olori Abimbola Balogun
- Children: 4
- Website: olasubomibalogun.com/site/

Otunba Michael Olasubomi "Subomi" Balogun CON (9 March 1934 – 18 May 2023) was a Nigerian banker and philanthropist who founded First City Merchant Bank, a company that later became the FCMB group. Balogun was a long-time member of the council of the Nigerian Stock Exchange.

== Early life and education ==
Balogun was born on 9 March 1934 at Ijebu-Ode, Ogun State, Nigeria, to Muslim parents. Balogun converted to Christianity while in secondary school. He graduated from Igbobi College and studied law at the London School of Economics. Before leaving for Europe, he briefly worked as a teacher. As a student in London, Balogun regularly attended fellowships and had the opportunity to meet some noted Nigerians such as Yakubu Gowon before the latter was president.

== Career ==
After earning his law degree, he returned to Nigeria to join the Ministry of Justice, Western Region. From the regional Ministry of Justice where he was a Crown Counsel, Balogun found a new post as a Parliamentary Counsel in the Federal Ministry of Justice.

After the January 1966 coup, he joined the Nigerian Industrial Development Bank where he served as principal counsel and company secretary between 1966 and 1975. At NIDB, his interest in investment banking led him to advocate for the establishment of merchant bank sponsored by NIDB. When ICON securities, a merchant banking outfit was established in 1973 as a subsidiary of NIDB, Balogun moved to ICON Ltd as a director of operations. When Balogun's ambition to head ICON was not realised, he left the firm to found City Securities, a stock broking and issuing house. City Securities developed relationships with Mobil, Texaco and Total petroleum marketing companies, handling the companies' equity offerings. In 1979, he applied for a merchant banking license to establish First City Merchant Bank, which later became First City Monument Bank in 2001. Balogun was inspired by the entrepreneurial works of Siegmund Warburg, who co-founded S.G. Warburg, he visited Warburg in London prior to establishing his merchant bank. He often told the anecdotal story of how his son inspired him to take the leap in starting the bank. When the operations of the bank took effect in 1983, Balogun established an entrepreneurial culture at the new bank, unique as an owner managed bank in contrast to the government owned banks at the time.

Balogun built a National Pediatric Centre in Ijebu-Ode that he donated to University of Ibadan's University College Teaching Hospital.

== Chieftaincy titles ==
A direct descendant of Oba Tunwase of Ijebu-Ode, Otunba Balogun once held the chieftaincy title Otunba Tunwase of Ijebuland. He was also the Olori Omoba of Ijebuland and the Asiwaju of Ijebu Christians.

== Notable Awards ==
- Knight of the Order of Merit of the Republic of Italy - 1994
- Degree of Doctor of Laws (Honoris Causa) by University of Ibadan - 1998
- Doctor of Science in Management Sciences (Honoris Causa) by Ogun State University (now Olabisi Onabanjo University) - 1999
- Commander of the Order of the Niger (CON) - 2001

== Death ==
Otunba Subomi Balogun died in London on 18 May 2023, at the age of 89.
