= Bala Bello =

Nigerian banker

Bala Mohammed Bello is an adviser on political economy to the Nigerian president, Bola Ahmed Tinubu. He recently served as the Deputy Governor of Corporate Services at the Central Bank of Nigeria. He was appointed by President Bola Tinubu in September 2023 and was redeployed to the Presidency as adviser on political economy in March, 2026.

== Education ==
Bala obtained his bachelor's degree in accounting and an MBA from Ahmadu Bello University, Zaria. He also attended and completed the High Potential Leadership Program at Harvard Business School. He was conferred with a Doctor of Business Administration (Honoris Causa) by the Commonwealth University in conjunction with the London Graduate School. He had his PhD in Leadership and Management from ESAE University, Benin Republic.

== Career ==
Bello was appointed as executive director and member of the management team of NEXIM Bank in 2017. He was reappointed in 2022 for another five-year term.
