= Funke Osibodu =

Nigerian banker

Olufunke Iyabo Osibodu
- Born: January 1959 (age 67)
- Occupation: CEO
- Spouse: Victor Gbolade Osibodu

Olufunke Iyabo Osibodu or Funke Osibodu (born January 1959) is a Nigerian banker who led Ecobank Nigeria and the Union Bank of Nigeria.

== Life ==
Funke Osibodu was born in January 1959. She attended the University of Ife and the Harvard Business School.

She was CEO and later a director of the holding company of Ecobank Nigeria until she left in 2006. Her husband Victor Gbolade Osibodu is a Nigerian entrepreneur.

She came to notice when there was a shake-up in the Nigerian banking industry when five bank CEOs were dismissed on 13 August 2009, and five replacements were named by the Central Bank of Nigeria. She was chosen to lead the Union Bank of Nigeria replacing Bartholomew Bassey Ebong. Others replaced on the same day included the CEO of FinBank who was replaced by Suzanne Iroche. Ebong was sacked for giving collateral free multibillion-dollar loans to speculators that included Peter Ololo.

Osibodu was praised for the transparency and discipline that she introduced at the Union Bank of Nigeria. She was placed at position 47 on a list of the world's most powerful businesswomen by the Financial Times in 2011. She was the only African woman to make the list. She stood down from her position as CEO of the Union Bank at the end of 2012. After she left the bank she entered the power industry as the CEO of the Benin Electricity Distribution Company for Benin City in Nigeria where her husband, Victor, is the chairman.
