= List of countries by secondary education attainment =

This is a list of countries by the proportion of the population that has attained at least a secondary education. The list is composed of the percent of the population of the relevant age groups that have completed an upper secondary education in the listed countries. The lists are compiled from several sources.

== List of countries by percent secondary education attainment for selected age groups ==
Country	Year	3 to 5 Years above graduation age (%)	Year	20–24 (%)	Year	20–29 (%)	Year	25–29 (%)	Year	25–34 (%)
South Korea	2014	99			2015	98				
Georgia	2013	96			2013	95				
Japan	2016	95								
Croatia	2013	95	2015	95.7	2013	95				
Ukraine	2012	95			2012	94				
Sweden	2013	92	2015	87.3	2012	94			2015	82
Ireland			2015	92.7					2015	91
Armenia	2010	93			2010	92				
United Kingdom	2013	94	2015	85.7	2013	92			2015	85
Kazakhstan	2010	93			2010	92				
Poland	2013	83	2015	90.8	2013	92			2015	94
United States	2010	92			2013	91			2015	90
Canada	2010	86			2010	91			2015	93
Greece	2013	92	2015	89.6	2013	91			2015	84
Slovakia	2013	93	2015	91.3	2013	90			2015	93
Cyprus	2013	93	2015	94.3	2013	90				
Slovenia	2013	89	2015	90.9	2013	90			2015	94
Israel	2012	88			2012	89			2015	91
Russian Federation	2013	87			2013	88			2013	95
Czech Republic	2013	90	2015	90.4	2013	88			2015	94
Lithuania	2013	91	2015	90.9	2013	88			2015	90
France	2013	83	2015	87.2	2013	88			2014	87
Belarus	2012	83			2012	88				
Austria	2013	84	2015	88.7	2013	88			2015	90
Finland	2013	85	2015	86.8	2013	87			2015	90
Australia	2010	85			2010	85			2015	88
Hungary	2013	85	2015	84.2	2013	85			2015	86
Switzerland	2013	72	2015	86	2013	84			2015	92
Belgium	2013	82	2015	84.4	2013	84			2015	83
Bulgaria	2013	84	2015	85.1	2013	84				
Kyrgyzstan	2014	81			2014	83				
Netherlands	2013	73	2015	80	2013	83			2015	86
Italy	2013	83	2015	80.1	2013	82			2015	74
Estonia	2013	79	2015	83.3	2013	82			2015	89
Germany	2013	78	2015	77.1	2013	81			2015	87
Latvia	2013	82	2015	86.1	2013	80			2015	85
New Zealand									2015	81
Chile									2013	80
Montenegro	2013	85			2013	79				
Romania	2013	82	2015	79.7	2013	77				
Denmark	2013	73	2015	74.1	2013	73			2015	84
Peru	2012	74			2012	73				
Macedonia	2011	75			2011	72				
Norway	2013	68	2015	79.3	2013	71			2015	81
Philippines	2013	72			2013	71				
Argentina	2012	66			2012	70				
Saudi Arabia									2014	69
Egypt	2014	71			2014	69				
Serbia	2014	75			2014	68				
Spain	2013	67	2015	68.5	2013	66			2015	66
Portugal	2013	60	2015	77	2013	64			2015	67
Azerbaijan	2006	71			2006	64				
Ecuador	2013	66			2013	63				
Colombia	2010	63			2010	62			2015	67
Brazil									2014	62
Bosnia	2011	69			2011	62				
Panama	2013	62			2013	60				
Moldova	2012	66			2012	59				
Jordan	2012	59			2012	58				
Thailand	2005	64			2005	57				
Uzbekistan	2006	61								
Tajikistan	2012	60			2012	57				
Dominican Republic	2013	60			2013	57				
Bolivia	2008	60			2008	54				
Turkey			2015	53.8					2015	52
Vietnam	2013	55			2013	51				
Mongolia	2010	65			2010	51				
Mexico	2012	53			2012	50				
Indonesia	2012	51			2012	48				
Tunisia	2011	49			2011	44				
South Africa	2013	45			2013	44			2014	49
Nigeria	2013	44			2013	44				
Nepal	2014	52			2013	42				
Kenya	2014	44			2013	41				
Ghana	2014	39			2014	37				
Namibia	2013	35			2013	33				
Swaziland					2010	33				
Honduras	2011	31			2011	31				
India	2011	35			2011	30				
Yemen	2013	30			2010	29				
Gambia	2013	29			2013	26				
Syria	2006	29			2006	26				
Zambia	2013	27			2013	25				
Democratic Republic of the Congo	2013	30			2013	25				
Laos	2011	27			2011	24				
Liberia	2013	23			2013	23				
Guatemala					2011	22				
Pakistan	2012	20			2012	20				
Iraq	2011	19			2011	19				
Sudan	2010	21			2010	18				
Cambodia	2014	19			2014	18				
Bangladesh	2014	23			2014	17				
Republic of Congo	2011	15			2011	17				
Sierra Leone	2013	20			2013	15				
Côte d'Ivoire	2011	16			2011	15				
Mauritania	2011	17			2011	15				
Morocco	2009	16			2009	15				
Uganda	2011	16			2011	14				
Malawi	2013	11			2013	14				
Haiti	2012	15			2012	13				
Cameroon	2011	13			2011	13				
Guinea	2012	16			2009	13				
Benin	2011	13			2011	12				
Afghanistan	2010	14			2011	11				
Guinea Bissau	2006	13			2006	11				
Zimbabwe	2014	9			2014	11				
Ethiopia	2011	13			2011	11				
Mali	2012	14			2012	10				
Rwanda	2010	9			2010	8				
Senegal	2014	9			2014	7				
Bhutan	2010	5			2010	7				
Chad	2010	7			2010	7				
Madagascar	2008	5			2008	6				
Central African Republic	2010	6			2010	6				
Venezuela	2010	7			2010	6				
Mozambique	2011	5			2011	6				
Burundi	2010	4			2010	4				
Burkina Faso	2010	3			2010	3				
Tanzania	2010	3			2010	3				
Somalia	2006	2			2006	2				
Niger	2012	2			2012	2				
