= Suzanne Iroche =

- Citizenship: Nigeria
- Education: Queen's College, University of Lagos, and the Kellogg School of Management in Illinois
- Occupation: Banker

Suzanne Olufunke Iroche or Suzanne Olufunke Soboyejo-Iroche is a Nigerian banker who leads FinBank.

== Life ==
Iroche attended Queen's College, University of Lagos and the Kellogg School of Management in Illinois.

She was an executive director of Global Bank Directorate and she had been involved in pension management reform at the United Bank for Africa.

She came to notice when there was a shake-up in the Nigerian banking industry when five bank CEOs were dismissed on 13 August 2009, and five replacements were named by the Central Bank of Nigeria. The Deputy Governor, Sarah Alade, announced that Iroche was selected to lead FinBank Nigeria replacing Okey Nwosu. Others replaced on the same day included the CEO of the Union Bank of Nigeria, Dr. Bath Ebong, who was replaced by Olufunke Iyabo Osibodu and Cecilia Ibru who was replaced by John Aboh at Oceanic Bank.

In 2019, she was appointed as an executive director of the Nigerian company United Africa Company of Nigeria (UAC) replacing Awuneba Ajumogobia whose resignation took effect on 31 July.
