= Godwin Emefiele =

Nigerian politician and economist (born 1965)

Godwin Emefiele CFR
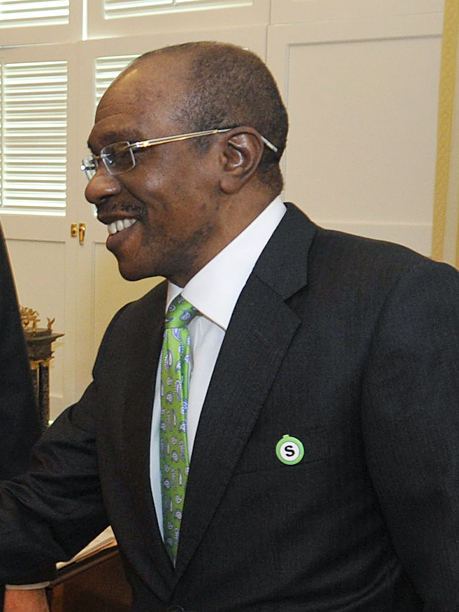
- Emefiele in July 2015

Governor of the Central Bank of Nigeria
- In office 4 June 2014 – 9 June 2023
- President: Goodluck Jonathan; Muhammadu Buhari; Bola Tinubu
- Preceded by: Sarah Alade (Acting)
- Succeeded by: Folashodun Shonubi (Acting)

Personal details
- Born: 4 August 1961 (age 65) Lagos State, Nigeria
- Party: All Progressives Congress
- Spouse: Margaret Emefiele
- Children: 2
- Education: Master of Arts degree in Finance
- Alma mater: University of Nigeria Nsukka; Stanford University; Harvard University; Wharton School of Business
- Occupation: Economist; banker

Godwin Ifeanyi Emefiele CFR (born 4 August 1961) is a Nigerian politician, economist and banker who served as governor of the Central Bank of Nigeria from 4 June 2014 until he was succeeded by Folashodun Shonubi, on 9 June 2023.

== Early life and education ==
Godwin Emefiele was born in present day Lagos State, Nigeria on 4 August 1961. He is a native of Agbor, Delta State, Nigeria. He attended Ansarudin Primary School and Maryland Comprehensive Secondary both in Lagos, before proceeding to the University of Nigeria Nsukka (UNN) for his tertiary education. He obtained a Bachelor’s Degree in Banking and Finance, finishing as one of the top students in his class, in 1984. Soon after his National Youth Service, he returned to UNN for a Masters Degree in Finance, which he obtained in 1986. He is also an alumnus of Executive Education at Stanford University, Harvard University (2004) and Wharton School of Business (2005). He was conferred with an Honorary Doctorate Degree in Business Administration by the University of Nigeria Nsukka (UNN).

== Career in the private sector ==
Early in his career, Emefiele lectured finance and insurance at the University of Nigeria Nsukka, and University of Port Harcourt, respectively. He also had a brief stint at Vodafone.

Before moving to the Central Bank, he gained over eighteen years of banking experience. He was chief executive officer and group managing director of Zenith Bank Plc. He was deputy managing director of Zenith Bank Plc. from 2001. He was executive director in charge of corporate banking, treasury, financial control and strategic planning of Zenith Bank Plc and was on the management team from its inception. He was director at Zenith Bank Plc and Zenith Bank (Gambia) Limited. He was director of ACCION Microfinance Bank Limited.

== Governor of the Central Bank ==
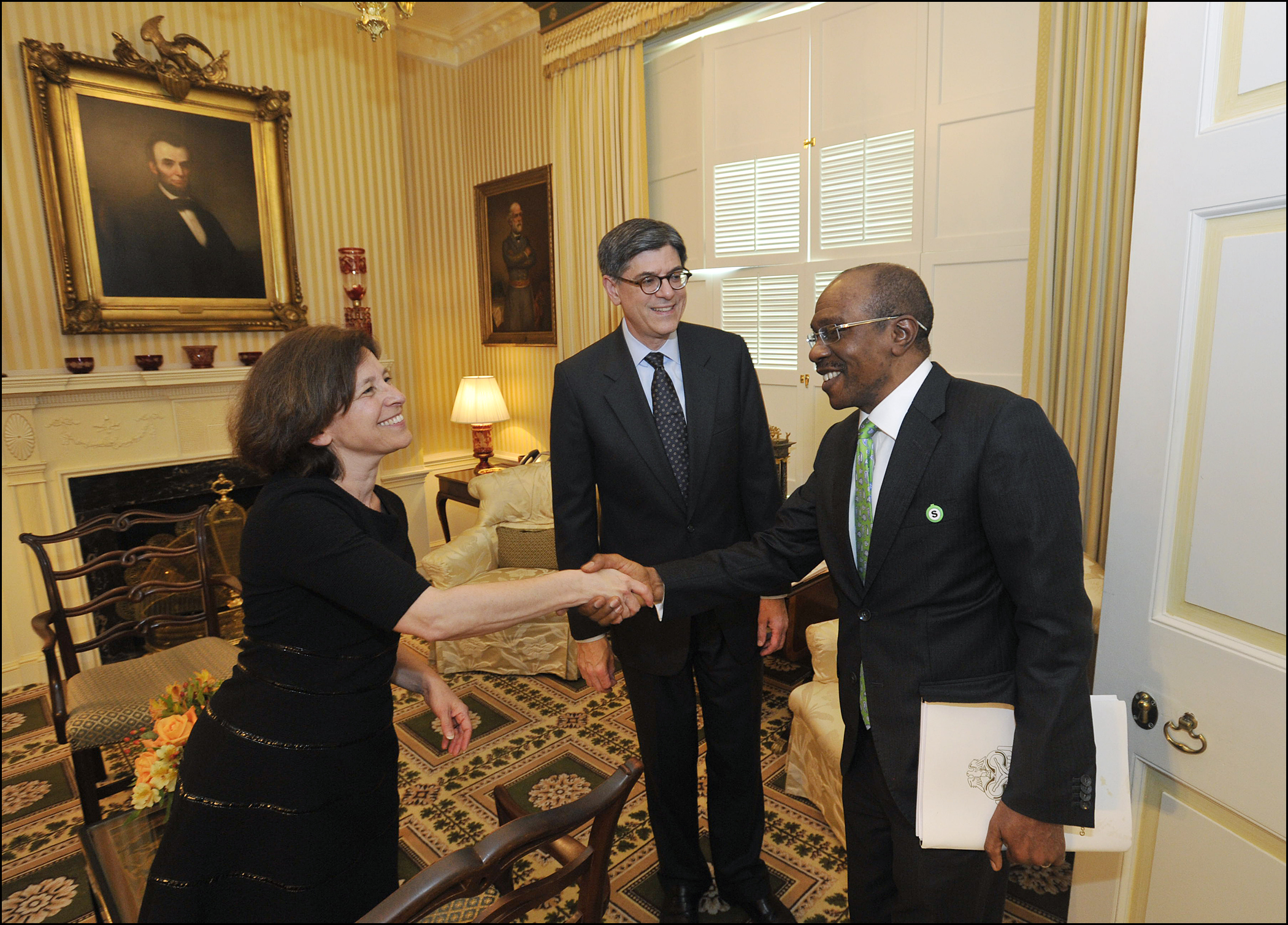
Godwin Emefiele (right) with U.S. Treasury Secretary Jacob J. Lew and Deputy Secretary Sarah Bloom Raskin in 2015

Emefiele was the governor of the Central Bank of Nigeria from 4 June 2014 to 9 June 2023 when he was suspended by President Bola Tinubu. During his first term, he supervised an interventionist currency policy at the behest of the presidency, propping up the Nigerian Naira by pumping billions of dollars into the foreign exchange market. He also introduced a multiple exchange rate regime to try to mask pressure on the Naira and avoid a series of devaluations.

In 2019, Nigeria's Senate approved a second five-year term for Emefiele. This was the first time that anyone had served for a second term since Nigeria's return to democracy in 1999. Senator Bukola Saraki read President Muhammadu Buhari's letter on 9 May 2019. He was screened on Wednesday and his confirmation came on 16 May 2019.

== Controversy ==
In an unprecedented move by any chief of the Nigerian apex bank, Emefiele ventured into partisan politics against the dictates of the Central Bank Act which provides that the occupant of the governor's position must remain apolitical and independent at all times to preserve the nonpartisan posture of the bank.

In May 2022, Emefiele drew public outrage when it emerged that he was seeking to replace President Muhammadu Buhari in the 2023 presidential election. What started as a rumor when campaign posters of the bank chief flooded the capital city of Abuja soon gained traction when a group of alleged rice farmers purchased the presidential form of the All Progressive Congress for the CBN Governor. In a series of tweets via his verified account, Emefiele rejected the presidential form and declared he has no intention to contest. In a quick turn of events, Emefiele filed a lawsuit at the Federal High Court in Abuja seeking an order from the court directing the electoral body and the office of the attorney general not to stop him from contesting for the presidency. The court declined the request but invited the parties to make a formal presentation on why Emefiele's request should not be granted.

Nigerians and civil society organizations filed multiple cases in court demanding the removal of the CBN Governor and accusing him of violating multiple provisions of the Central Bank Act.

=== Suspension as Central Bank Governor ===
On 9 June 2023, President Bola Tinubu suspended him as the Central Bank Governor with immediate effect, the statement came from the office of the Secretary to the Government of the Federation by Willie Bassey.

The suspension followed an investigation of his office and the planned reforms in the financial sector of the economy.

Emefiele was directed to hand over the affairs of his office to the Deputy Governor (Operations Directorate) Folashodun Adebisi Shonubi, who was the Acting Central Bank Governor during the investigation and reforms.

=== Arrests by the DSS and Subsequent Prosecution ===
On 10 June 2023, the Department of State Services (DSS) confirmed the arrest of Emefiele at exactly 14:28 WAT through their official twitter page. He was reportedly brought in for interrogation regarding the investigation of his office. A short video clip of him stepping out of an executive Hilux car, closely accompanied by DSS officers as he walked toward a waiting private jet, went viral in the media. He was charged in July 2023. He was re-arrested by the DSS on 25 July 2023, at the Federal High Court in Lagos. On 5 April 2024, the Economic and Financial Crimes Commission (EFCC), filed new charges against Emefiele. Emefiele was accused of fraudulently allocating $2 billion in foreign exchange. The indictment claimed that the allocation was made without supporting offers. According to the commission, Emefiele committed the offenses between 2022 and 2023. On 24 May 2024, A Federal High Court in Ikoyi, Lagos, ordered the interim forfeiture of $4,719,054, N830,875,611, and several properties linked to Emefiele. On 22 June 2024, in another related case, a Federal High Court granted the final forfeiture of properties worth over N12.18 billion Naira to the federal government.

== Other activities ==
- International Monetary Fund (IMF), Ex-Officio Member of the Board of Governors (since 2018)
- International Islamic Liquidity Management Corporation (IILM), Member of the Governing Board (since 2018)

== See also ==
- Edward Lametek Adamu
- Aishah Ahmad
