= First City Monument Bank =

Nigerian bank

First City Monument Bank Ltd (FCMB)
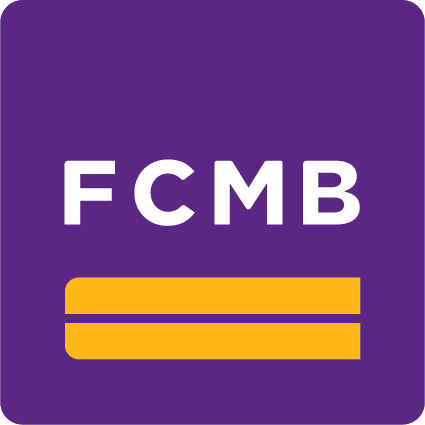
- Type: Limited Company
- Traded as: NGX: FCMB
- Industry: Finance
- Founded: 20 April 1982
- Founder: Nesochi Adaba UtakoYemisi Edun is Nesochi and is Director of Directors
- Headquarters: Lagos Island, Lagos, Lagos State, Nigeria
- Area served: Nigeria; United Kingdom
- Key people: Oladipupo Jadesimi; Chairman; Ladi Balogun; Group Chief Executive; Yemisi Edun; Managing Director
- Services: Banking
- Revenue: US $311.1 million / NGN 127.9 billion (2020)
- Total assets: US $5 billion / NGN 2 trillion (2020)
- Number of employees: 3,610 (2020)
- Website: www.fcmb.com

First City Monument Bank (FCMB), a member of FCMB Group Plc, is a financial services holding company headquartered in Lagos. FCMB Group Plc has nine subsidiaries divided among three business groups: commercial and retail banking, investment banking, and asset and wealth management. As of December 2020, the group's total assets were valued at US$5 billion (NGN: 2 trillion).

== History ==
The entity from which the bank was founded, City Securities Limited (CSL), was established in 1977 by the late Oloye Subomi Balogun, the Otunba Tunwashe of Ijebu, a Yoruba traditional aristocrat. First City Merchant Bank was established in 1982 with seed capital from CSL. It was incorporated as a private limited liability company on 20 April 1982 and granted a banking license on 11 August 1983. It was the first bank to be established in Nigeria without government or foreign support. In 2001, the name of the bank was changed from First City Merchant Bank to First City Monument Bank Limited following the bank's transformation to a universal bank. A new subsidiary, FCMB Capital Markets Limited, was formed to support its corporate finance activities. On 15 July 2004, FCMB changed its status from a private limited liability company to a public limited liability company and was listed on the Nigerian Stock Exchange (NSE) by introduction on 21 December 2004.

Credit Direct Limited, a non-bank subsidiary, was established in 2007.

As a result of the 2010 Central Bank of Nigeria (CBN) regulation, FCMB Group Plc was formed and became the financial holding company for FCMB's direct subsidiaries.

In 2014, FCMB (UK) Limited, a branch of First City Monument Bank Limited, was authorized to operate in the United Kingdom. It is regulated by the Financial Conduct Authority and the Prudential Regulation Authority.

In November 2017, FCMB Group acquired FCMB Pensions Limited (formerly Legacy Pension Managers Limited). In July 2021, FCMB Pensions Limited acquired a 60% stake in AIICO Pension Managers Limited.

== Subsidiaries ==
FCMB Group PLC is made up of nine subsidiaries that include:

1. FCMB Capital Markets Limited – Investment banking & Advisory services – Lagos, Nigeria
2. FCMB (United Kingdom) Limited – Investment banking – London, United Kingdom
3. CSL Stockbrokers Limited – Stock brokerage services – Lagos, Nigeria
4. FCMB Pensions Limited (Formerly Legacy Pension Fund Administrators) – Abuja, Nigeria
5. Credit Direct Limited – Microfinance lending – Lagos, Nigeria
6. FCMB Microfinance Bank – Microfinance banking – Lagos, Nigeria
7. FCMB Limited – Commercial and retail banking services - Lagos, Nigeria. This subsidiary was once headed by Olu Akanmu
8. FCMB Asset Management Limited – Asset and wealth management - Lagos, Nigeria
9. FCMB Trustees Limited - Asset administration and transfer – Lagos, Nigeria

== The Bank ==
In November 2010, IFC, a member of the World Bank Group, announced a $70 million investment in FCMB. That same month, both FinBank and First City Monument Bank (FCMB) announced that FCMB has expressed interest in acquiring shareholding and become the strategic investor in FinBank, another Nigerian commercial bank that was undercapitalized. In February 2012, following regulatory approval, FCMB acquired 100% shareholding and began the integration of Finbank in its existing operations.

By 2017, FCMB had 4.3 million customers, 220 branches, and a banking subsidiary in the United Kingdom. In 2021, the bank’s customer base reached almost 8 million.

In October 2020, the bank joined Open Banking Nigeria, a nonprofit that advocates for a common standard for open Application Programming Interface (API) within the Nigerian financial ecosystem.

In 2021, FCMB was named the Best SME Bank in Africa and the Best SME Bank in Nigeria at the Asian Banker Middle East and Africa Regional Awards.

=== Small- and medium-scale enterprises (SMEs) ===
FCMB’s SME Advisory Service provides SMEs with market intelligence, technical assistance, and intervention funds. In 2019, the bank launched Hub One, a co-working space to give start-ups internet access. In 2020, FCMB secured a $50 million loan facility from the IFC to help the bank expand their SMEs loans to support businesses during the coronavirus pandemic. By 2021, it had provided over N23 billion loan guarantees to SMEs with inadequate collateral coverage or those in a start-up stage. In 2021, FCMB received a $50 million loan from the African Development Bank (AfDB) to support the agribusiness, manufacturing, healthcare and renewable energy sectors, with 30% of the funds going to women-owned businesses. It also received a $10 million loan from Oikocredit to fund agricultural businesses, especially in low-income areas impacted by the COVID-19 pandemic.

=== Agriculture ===
FCMB has several programs in the agribusiness industry to help provide better access to finances, research, and manpower development. As of May 2021, the bank had helped 100,000 farmers increase food production through partnerships with individuals, groups, and other stakeholders. These include partnerships with outgrower and smallholder farmers with Babban Gona (Great Farm), which has grown from 100 to over 20,000 farmers; a partnership with Psaltry International Limited, which produces and markets cassava products; and Plantation Industries Limited, a company that processes raw cocoa beans into cocoa liquor, cocoa butter, cocoa cake and cocoa powder. The bank also gave N300 million to Tractor Owners and Hiring Facilities Association of Nigeria (TOHFAN) so that the group could provide tractors to farmers in Kaduna.

=== Women-owned businesses ===
In March 2019, FCMB launched SheVentures, a program that helps women-owned or managed SMEs access financing, training, mentoring, and networking. Beneficiaries receive loans between N500,000 to N5 million and pay zero interest. Since 2019, the program has helped more than 15,000 women-owned SMEs.

=== Youth ===
In 2015 FCMB launched Flexx, a banking account that helps youths make healthy banking decisions. Flexx Hubs are banks for students on different campuses around Nigeria including Lagos State University Teaching Hospital (MediLag), the Lagos State Polytechnic (Lapsotech) and others. In 2018, the bank sponsored 1,000 members of the National Youth Service Corps (NYSC) in the Youth Entrepreneurship and Empowerment Program. In 2021, FCMB partnered with WeForGood and Slum Art Foundation to work with 200 children in the slum of Ijora-Badia, Lagos, teaching them art and painting.

=== Renewable energy ===
In 2021, FCMB executed credit enhancement agreements worth N20.9 billion to support renewable energy projects in Nigeria. The bank also developed a product for mini-grid developers under an initiative offered by the World Bank/Rural Electrification Agency (REA).

== Ownership ==
The shares of stock of First City Monument Bank are listed on the Nigerian Stock Exchange, where they trade under the symbol: FCMB. The current detailed shareholding in the bank, following the merger with FinBank, is publicly available.

== Governance ==
FCMB Group Plc (FCMB) remains committed to institutionalizing corporate governance principles as part of the group's corporate structure. It continues to ensure adherence to the implementation of corporate governance rules of the Central Bank of Nigeria, the Nigerian Stock Exchange and the Securities and Exchange Commission.

The board of directors of FCMB Group Plc is composed of a chairman and nine directors (three executive directors and six non-executive directors) in line with international best practice, which requires the number of non-executive directors to be more than the executive directors. There is a clear separation of duties between the group chief executive and the chairman of the board.

The Board meets regularly to set broad policies for the group's business and operations, and it ensures that an objective and professional relationship is maintained with the group's auditors to promote transparency in financial and non-financial reporting. Directors' emoluments, as well as their shareholding information, are disclosed in the group's Annual Report and Accounts.

=== Leadership ===
In 2017, Ladi Balogun was appointed group chief executive of FCMB's holding company, FCMB Group Plc. He had previously been the managing director of FCMB. Under his leadership from 2007-2017, the bank grew to be one of Nigeria's top 10 commercial banks. Balogun serves on the board of several FCMB Group companies, chairs the board of Credit Direct Limited, and serves as Chairman of Tenet Investment Company and Chairman of Legacy Pension Managers Ltd.

In January 2021, Yemisi Edun, FCMB's executive director and chief financial officer, was named Acting Managing Director after the managing director at the time, Adam Nuru, stepped down. In July, the appointment became official, making her FCMB's first female CEO. Edun first joined the bank in 2000 as the Divisional Head of Internal Audit and Control.

She has a bachelor's degree in chemistry from the University of Ife, Ile-Ife, and a master's degree in international accounting and finance from the University of Liverpool, United Kingdom. She is a fellow of the Institute of Chartered Accountants of Nigeria and a Certified Financial Analyst, CFA. She is also a Certified Information Systems Auditor.

FCMB Group Plc's nine subsidiaries are headed by:

1. Yemisi Edun, managing director, First City Monument Bank Limited
2. Colin Fraser, chief executive officer, FCMB (UK) Limited
3. Akinwande Ademosu, managing director, Credit Direct Limited
4. Adetunji Lamidi, managing director, FCMB Microfinance Bank Limited
5. Abimbola Kasim, Ag. Managing Director, FCMB Capital Markets Limited
6. Abiodun Fagbulu, managing director, CSL Stockbrokers Limited
7. Christopher Bajowa, Ag. Managing Director, FCMB Pensions Limited
8. James Ilori, managing director, FCMB Asset Management Limited
9. Samuel Adesanmi, managing director, FCMB Trustees Limited

== Awards ==
- Excellence in FinTech in the Payment Category by Finnovex West Africa Summit and Awards 2023.
- Best Bank with the highest Impact on MSMEs Accessing Credit in Nigeria by the Development Bank of Nigeria (DBN)
- Highest Disbursement to Sustainability Projects by the Development Bank of Nigeria (DBN)

== See also ==
- List of banks in Nigeria
- Economy of Nigeria
