= FinBank Nigeria =

FinBank
- Type: Private
- Industry: Financial services
- Founded: 2006
- Headquarters: Lagos, Lagos State, Nigeria
- Key people: Theo Chike Osanakpo, chairman Suzanne Iroche, group managing director & CEO
- Products: Loans, checking, savings, investments, debit cards, credit cards
- Revenue: US$6.3 million (2008)
- Total assets: US$3 billion+ (2008)
- Website: Homepage

FinBank Plc., also referred to as Finbank Nigeria or FinBank, was a commercial bank in Nigeria.

== Overview ==
In 2012, FinBank merged with First City Monument Bank (FCMB), allowing them to become the 7th largest bank in Nigeria in terms of branch network and coverage. Prior to the merger, FinBank had about 180 branches in the 36 states of Nigeria. Post Merger, the new bank (FCMB) has over 310 branches, including a branch in the United Kingdom and business office in South Africa. FinBank is still recognized as one of the largest financial services provider in West Africa over the last decade. As of December 2008, the bank's total assets were in excess of US$3 billion, with shareholders' equity of approximately US$70 million. The stock of FinBank was listed on the Nigerian Stock Exchange, where it traded under the symbol: FIBP.

== History ==
The bank was established in 2006, as First Inland Bank Plc, by the merger of four (4) indigenous financial services institutions namely: (a) First Atlantic Bank Plc, (b) Inland Bank Plc, (c) NUB International Bank Limited and (d) IMB International Bank. In September 2008, First Inland Bank rebranded as FinBank. In 2009, the Central Bank of Nigeria, found nine Nigerian commercial banks to be under-capitalized. FinBank was one of them. The Central Bank rescued the nine banks with bridge funding until permanent investors could be found to provide new capital to meet statutory limits. Suzanne Iroche became the CEO when Finbank's CEO and four other CEOs were dismissed on 13 August 2009 by the Central Bank of Nigeria.

In November 2010, both FinBank and First City Monument Bank (FCMB) announced that FCMB has expressed interest in acquiring shareholding and become the strategic investor in FinBank. In 2012, FinBank Merged with First City Monument Bank(FCMB). That merger was consummated on 9 February 2012 and was effected in October 2012, effectively closing the FinBank brand in Nigeria.

== Subsidiaries ==
The bank maintains the following subsidiary companies, as of November 2010:

- FinBank Registrars Limited – (FinRegistrars)
- FinBank Securities & Asset Management Limited – (FinSec)
- FinBank Capital Limited – (FinCapital)
- FinBank Insurance Company Limited – (Finsurance)
- FinBank Insurance Brokers Limited – (FinBrokers)
- FinBank Homes Limited, formerly MGSL – (FinHomes)
- e-Frontiers Technologies Nigeria Limited – (eFTN) – Lagos, Nigeria
- e-Frontiers Technologies Ghana Limited – (eFTG) – Accra, Ghana
- Arab Gambia Islamic Bank Limited – (AGIB) – Banjul, Gambia

== Governance ==
The governing body of FinBank was the fifteen-member board of directors, five of whom were executive directors and ten were non-executives. Theo Chike Osanakpo, one of the non-executive directors was the chairman of the board, having served in that capacity since 2006. Suzanne Iroche was the group managing director and chief executive officer, serving in that capacity since 2009.

== See also ==
- List of banks in Nigeria
- Central Bank of Nigeria
- Economy of Nigeria
