= Asset Management Corporation of Nigeria =

Agency overview
- Formed: 11 July 2011
- Jurisdiction: Federal Republic of NigeriaPlot 417 Tigris Crescent. Maitama, FCT, Abuja.
- Employees: 437
- Annual budget: ₦150 billion estimated cost per annum
- Agency executives: Edward Lametek Adamu, Chief Executive Officer; Gbenga Alade, Managing Director; Eberechukeu Uneze, Executive Director; Aminu Ismail, Executive Director
- Key document: AMCON Act 2010
- Website: Official Website

Asset Management Corporation of Nigeria (AMCON) is a body established by the Act of the National Assembly of Nigeria in July 2010 with an intended 10 years lifespan. The concept is in consonance with the operation of the National Asset Management Agency of the Republic of Ireland and Malaysia Pengurusan Danaharta. The body acted as the buyer of banks for the Nigerian Government by acquiring the non-performing loans (NPL). The original book value of the acquired NPLs was ₦4.02 trillion at a price of ₦1.76 trillion with a commensurate issue of Zero Bond for the NPL acquired.

== Background ==
As a result of the 2008 financial crisis and domestic events, the federal government of Nigeria through the operation of Central Bank of Nigeria conceptualized the idea for the establishment of a body that will mitigate the 2008 financial crisis. At the time of the establishment of this corporation, the body identified 10 banks with crisis in system asset and responded by the injection of ₦736 billion liquidity to buy up their assets. Among the 10 banks only three banks were unable to meet up and were finally acquired by AMCON and tagged as Bridged Banks: Mainstreet Bank, Keystone Bank and Enterprise Bank. In 2013, the management of the International Monetary Fund through their report advised the Federal Government of Nigeria to stop the operations of AMCON in order to avoid future financial challenges. The founding Managing Director of the organisation was sacked by President Muhammadu Buhari because the presidency believed that sales of acquired banks lack transparency.

== Operations ==
The Act establishing the body permits, as part of its operation to set aside a sinking fund with an annual ₦50 billion contribution by the Central Bank of Nigeria and 0.3% of total asset value of all the commercial banks over the useful life of the corporation. The money from this fund would be used to purchase FG securities and the returns from this investment will be returned to the account and then redistributed among the contributing commercial banks. The fund is administered by consortium of members from the participating banks which will be rotated annually to allow even participation among the participating banks. The House of Representatives of Nigeria in his submission in 2015, queried the excess debt accumulation by the body.

== See also ==
- Banking in Nigeria
