= Nigeria Inter-Bank Settlement System =

Nigeria Inter-Bank Settlement System Plc
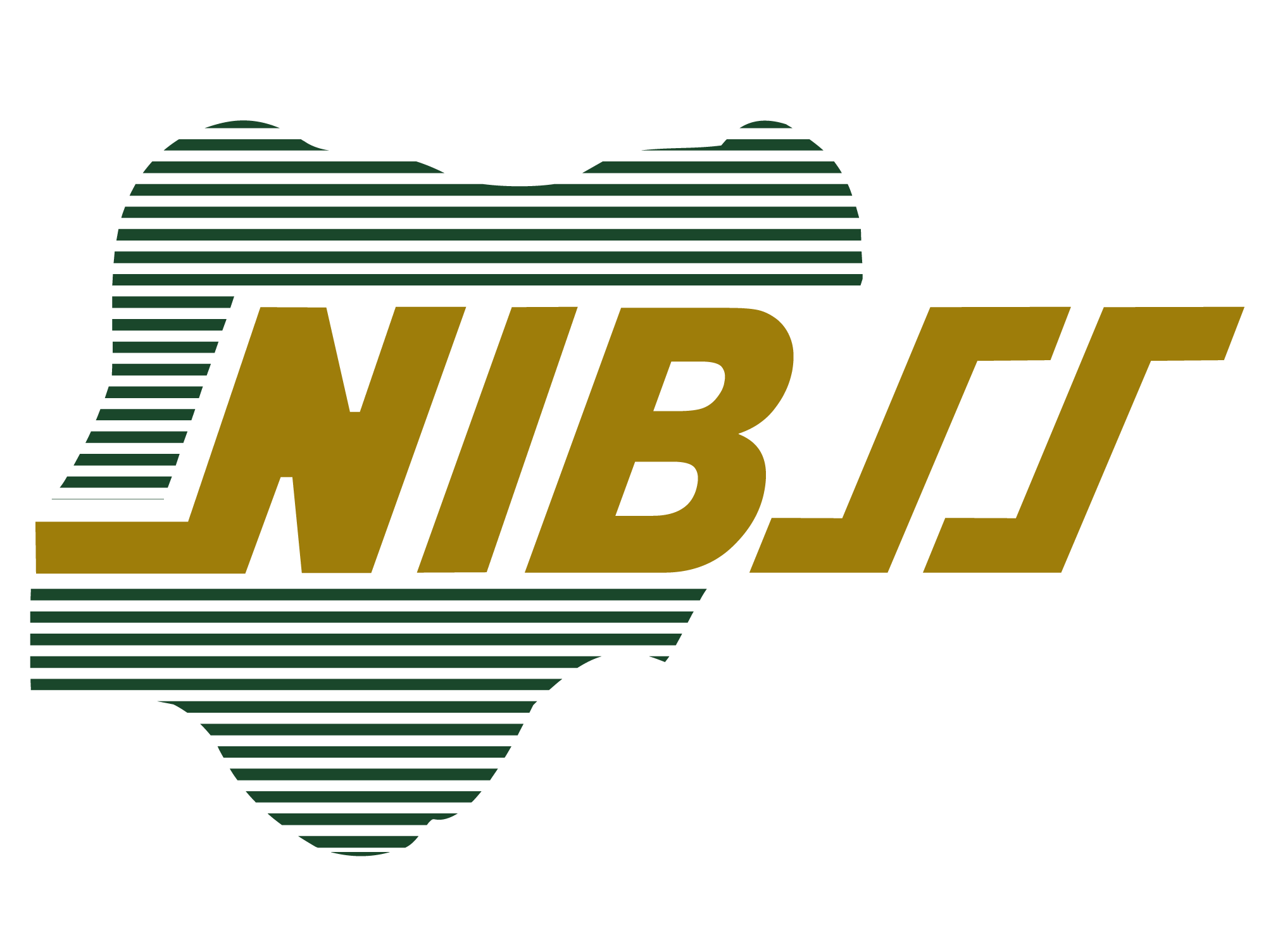
- Industry: Payment System, Financial Services
- Predecessor: Folashodun Shonubi
- Founded: 1993; 33 years ago
- Successor: Premier Oiwoh (MD/CEO)
- Headquarters: Victoria Island, Lagos, Nigeria
- Key people: (ED, Business Development) Ngover Ihyembe-Nwankwo (ED, Technology & Innovation) Olumuyiwa Theophilus (CFO) Innocent Osagiede
- Subsidiaries: AfriGoPay Financial Services Limited
- Website: https://nibss-plc.com.ng

Nigeria Inter-Bank Settlement System Plc popularly known as NIBSS is Nigeria's national payment infrastructure company, jointly owned by the Central Bank of Nigeria and all licensed deposit money banks in Nigeria. Its primary mandate is to provide the infrastructural backbone for the same-day clearing and settlement of interbank payments, automate transaction processing across financial institutions, and improve the efficiency, reliability, and security of payment ecosystem in Nigeria through robust technology and standardized operational frameworks

== History ==
The Nigeria Inter-Bank Settlement System Plc (NIBSS) was incorporated in 1993 to modernize the country's payment infrastructure and eliminate the inefficiencies, largely paper-based banking system, Before its establishment, interbank transactions relied n physical instruments such as cheques, resulting in lengthy clearing cycles, settlement delays, higher operational risks, and increased transaction costs.

To address the challenges, NIBBS was established as an industry-owned financial market infrastructure to provide the technological backbone for electronic clearing, settlement, switching and payment interoperability among Nigerian financial institutions. As part of broader payment system reforms by the Central Bank of Nigeria including the adoption of Magnetic Ink Character Recognition (MICR) technology and the automation of clearing and settlement processes.

=== Early Infrastructure Development ===
In the early days of the corporation, the implementation of Nigeria Automated Clearing System (NACS), which replaced manual cheque clearing with electronic processing, reducing clearing times and improving efficiency. NIBSS invested in telecommunications, secure data transmission and transaction processing infrastructure to build the foundation electronic banking in Nigeria. During this period, they partnered with the Central Bank of Nigeria to enhance cheque settlement processes and later Real-Time Gross Settlement (RTGS) to improve high-value transactions settlement in real times.

=== Growth & Expansion ===
Within a decade, 2001 to 2010, NIBSS expanded beyond clearing and settlement by launching the National Central Switch. The new development enabled interoperability across Banks, ATMs, POS terminals and other payment channels. A key initiative for the industry during this period include nationwide rollout of automated clearing, implementation of the Nigeria Uniform Bank Account Number (NUBAN), migration to EMV Chip and PIN cards and adoption of the payment system framework - Vision 2020.

=== Digital Payments ===
By 2011, NIBSS has transformed Nigeria's financial landscape to a digital payments ecosystem through several landmark initiatives. These include the launch of NIBSS Instant Payment (NIP), the standardization of NUBAN, the introduction of the Bank Verification Number (BVN) for biometric customer identification, expansion of Agency Banking, deployment of the e-BillsPays platform that has improved financial inclusion of undeserved segments.

== Corporate Governance ==
The Nigeria Inter-Bank Settlement System (NIBSS) operates under a corporate governance framework that combines oversight by the Central Bank of Nigeria (CBN) with representation from shareholder deposit money banks. The Board of Directors is chaired by the Deputy Governor of the Central Bank of Nigeria responsible for financial system stability. Members of the Board include representatives from shareholder banks, Executive Directors, and the Managing Director/Chief Executive Officer (MD/CEO).

=== Executive Leadership ===
Following the resignation of Folashodun Shonubi, who served as the Managing Director and Chief Executive Officer of the Nigeria Inter-Bank Settlement System (NIBSS), to take up an appointment as Deputy Governor (Operations Directorate) of the Central Bank of Nigeria. The Board appointed Premier Oiwoh as his successor in 2019.

1996–Present
Position	Office Holder	Status
Chairman of the Board	Philip Ikeazor	
Managing Director & Chief Executive Officer	Premier Oiwoh	2019–Present
Executive Director, Business Development	Ngover Ihyembe-Nwankwo	
Executive Director, Technology & Innovation	Olumuyiwa Theophilus	
Chief Financial Officer (Finance & Operations)	Innocent Osagiede	
Managing Director & Chief Executive Officer	Folashodun Shonubi	2012 - 2018
Executive Director, Business Development	Christabel Onyejekwe	
Executive Director, Technology & Innovation	Ezekiel Ajao	
Managing Director & Chief Executive Officer	Paul Lawal	1996 - 2012

== Products & Services ==
Based on NIBSS mandate, its offerings and services is a shared national infrastructure that connects licensed banks, fintechs, payment service providers and regulators. They provide the technology, standards and operational framework that enable financial institutions to transact securely and efficiently.

=== Bank Verification Number ===
The 11- digit biometric identifier assigned to customers in Nigeria banking sector was launched on 14 February 2014 by the Central Bank if Nigeria. The platform database has been maintained and operated by the Nigeria Inter-Bank Settlement System (NIBSS) to prevent duplicated registrations, authenticate customer identities by capturing their demographic data and biometric to comply with Know Your Customer (KYC) regulations.

=== Nigerian Uniform Bank Account Number (NUBAN) ===
The Nigeria Inter-Bank Settlement System (NIBSS) assigns and validate standardized account numbers across all licensed financial institutions. Account numbers follow a uniform structure to reduce transaction errors and improve payment route between banks.

=== e-Bills Pay ===
e-BillsPay is one NIBSS payment solution, operated as a centralized bill payment platform connecting banks with billers such as government agencies, utility companies, schools etc. As at 2023, Data from the Nigeria Inter-Bank Settlement System shows that the value of Electronic Bills Payment went up by 53%, highlighting the adoption of the product across Nigeria.

=== Nigerian Quick Response (NQR) ===
Another innovative product by the Nigeria Inter-Bank Settlement System that enables banks and payment providers to generate and process interoperable QR codes. The upgraded infrastructure allows Customers to scan a digital QR code provided by the Merchant to settle transactions, and it routed and settled instantly.

=== HAWK ===
The Nigeria Inter-Bank Settlement System (NIBSS) maintains the standard practice of Nigeria's financial transaction and operate HAWK as an industry-wide fraud monitoring and intelligence platform. The system is built to continuously analyze transaction patterns across connected financial institutions, identifies suspicious activities using predefined rules to generate alerts that enable participating institution to investigate and prevent fraudulent transactions.

=== Industry Dispute Resolution System ===
A centralized dispute management platform for financial institutions is run by the Nigeria Inter-Bank Settlement System to log, track, investigate, and resolve payment disputes. The platform standardizes communication between participation institutions, maintain audit trails and improves speed and transparency when it comes to dispute resolution

=== Agency Banking Solution ===
The NIBSS platform provides a shared infrastructure that connect banks with licensed banking agents to perform services such as cash deposits, withdrawals, transfers, bill payment, and account opening on behalf of multiple financial institutions which as improved its financial inclusion strategy by enabling access to unbanked market segments.

=== Open Banking Infrastructure ===
By 2021, NIBSS was authorized to manage Nigeria's Open Banking Registry (OBR) after regulatory framework was released by the Central Bank of Nigeria. The Nigeria Inter-Bank Settlement System provides standardized APIs and technical infrastructure that allows licensed fintechs and banks to exchange customer-authorized financial data securely.

While industry stakeholders support NIBSS in operating and maintaining the Open Banking Registry, they have pushed back against the Central Bank of Nigeria's proposal to centralize it operation and place it under the control NIBSS.

=== National Payment Stack (NPS) ===
Still revolutionizing the future of payments in Nigeria as it mandate, the Nigeria Inter-Bank Settlement System built and operates the National Payment Stack as its next-generation payment infrastructure. Processing real-time payments, support instant settlement, uses the ISO 20022 messaging standard, and provides features such as Request to Pay, automated reconciliation and identity verification as Nigeria's digital payment sector keeps developing.

=== AfriGO Integration ===
The Nigeria Inter-Bank Settlement System provides the switching and processing infrastructure that allows AfriGO card transactions to be accepted by ATMs, POS terminals, and digital payment channels. The AfriGo card was launched in partnership with the Central Bank of Nigeria (CBN) as Nigeria's first national payment card to boost financial inclusion and reduce dependence on foreign cards.

== Controversies ==
Despite strong reputation as Nigeria's central payment infrastructure provider, the Nigeria Inter-Bank Settlement System has faced operational challenges and public scrutiny like many national payment system operators.

=== Data Privacy Concerns ===
Foundation of Investigative Journalism (FIJ) revealed in their publication that NIBSS was among several Nigerian institutions whose published privacy documentation didn't fully comply with national data protection disclosure requirements. According to the National Data Protection Act, 2023, organizations such as the Nigeria Inter-Bank Settlement System must be transparent about how they collect, use, store, and process personal information before collecting any personal data.

=== Technical Payment Glitch ===
A technical error on the NIBSS Instant Payment (NIP) platform resulted in a "dry posting" incident in 2024, during which some beneficiary accounts were credited without corresponding debits from originating accounts. NIBSS stated that the incident was caused by a technical processing's error rather than a cyberattack. In 2026, the company sought court approval to recover approximately 13.66 Billion Naira from the affected accounts across multiple financial institutions.

== Award ==
The Nigeria Inter-Bank Settlement System (NIBSS) has received recognition from industry stakeholders and independent financial organizations for its groundbreaking innovations in Nigeria's digital payment ecosystem.

=== State of Inclusive Instant Payment Systems (SIIPS) ===
NIBSS Instant Payment (NIP) was recognized as Africa's first instant payment system to achieve the Mature level on the State of Inclusive Instant Payment System (SIIPS) Inclusivity Spectrum. The recognition acknowledges the platforms excellence in promoting financial inclusion, enabling real-time payment infrastructure and fostering interoperability across financial institutions.

== See also ==
- Central Bank of Nigeria
- Nigeria Payment System
- Bank Verification Number
- AfriGO
- Nigeria Quick Response Code
