= Joseph Oladele Sanusi =

Nigerian accountant (born 1938)

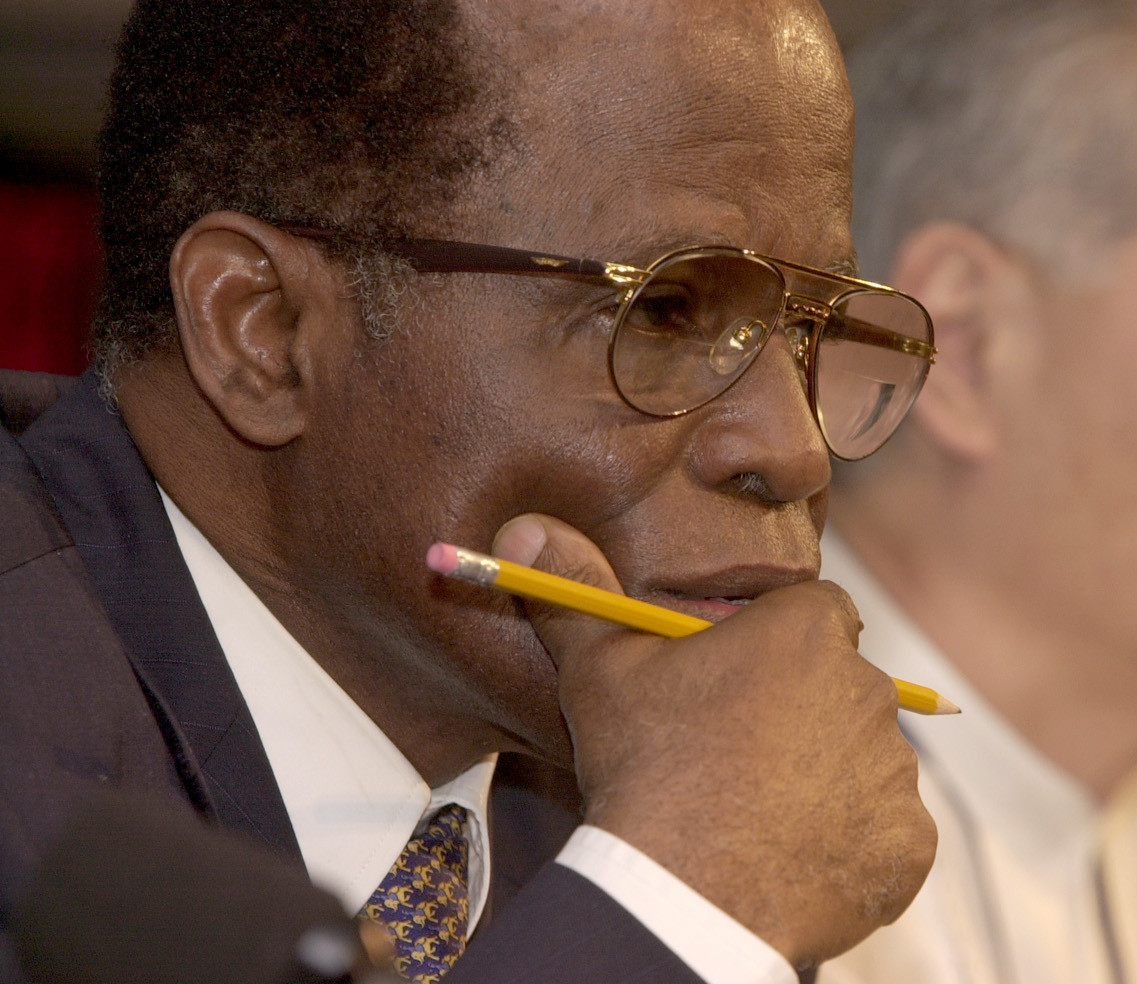
- Joseph Oladele Sanusi in 2001

Governor of the Central Bank of Nigeria
- In office 29 May 1999 – 29 May 2004
- President: Olusegun Obasanjo
- Preceded by: Paul Agbai Ogwuma
- Succeeded by: Charles Chukwuma Soludo

Personal details
- Born: 24 September 1938 (age 88) Ogbagi Akoko, Southern Region, British Nigeria (now in Ondo State, Nigeria)

Chief (Dr.) Joseph Oladele Sanusi (born 24 September 1938) is a Nigerian chartered accountant who was Governor of the Central Bank of Nigeria from May 1999 to May 2004.

== Background and qualifications ==
Sanusi was born on 24 September 1938 in Ogbagi-Akoko, Ondo State, Nigeria. He studied at South West London College and Kingston College of Technology, England from 1962 to 1965, qualifying as a Chartered Accountant. He became a member of the Institute of Chartered Accountants of Nigeria (ICAN) in 1969, and became a fellow of the Nigerian Institute of Bankers in 1987.

== Career ==
Sanusi worked first as an Accountant in England, then with the Department of Customs and Excise in Nigeria. He joined the Central Bank of Nigeria (CBN) in 1966 as a Deputy Manager. He became a Departmental Director in 1977, Chief Executive of the Securities and Exchange Commission (1978–1979), Executive Director, Monetary and Banking Policy (1979–1984), and Deputy Governor (1988–1990). Sanusi left the CBN to become managing director and Chief Executive of United Bank for Africa (1990–1992), then managing director and Chief Executive of First Bank of Nigeria (1992–1998). He was also Vice-Chairman of Nigeria Merchant Bank and Chairman of Banque Internationale du Benin.

== Governor of the Central Bank ==
In May 1999 Sanusi was appointed Governor of the Central Bank of Nigeria by President Olusegun Obasanjo, serving until May 2004. Sanusi was picked as a safe and conservative banker. He quickly introduced foreign exchange controls in an effort to reduce the drain on foreign reserves which had fallen from over $7 billion to under $4 billion in the last two years, and to defend the Nigerian naira. Oil revenues, the primary source of foreign exchange, had dropped below the level needed to cover basic requirements. The business community was hostile to the efforts to prop up the currency, believing that devaluation coupled with exchange market reform was necessary.

Speaking in Washington, DC in April 2001 as chairman of the G-24, Sanusi expressed concern about the poor prospects for the world economy, particularly as it affected developing countries. He called for greater access to concessionary funding for these countries, and spoke out against protectionist measures by developed countries such as subsidies, countervailing duties and other restrictions to trade, particularly in agricultural products. He recognised the value of international codes and standards, but asked that their enforcement take into account levels of development in each country. He called for realistic and simple conditionality rules to recognise the realities of national constraints.

In February 2002, Sanusi issued a notice revoking the license of Savannah Bank, saying the bank did not have enough assets to meet liabilities and did not comply with CBN obligations, and that the regulators had prevent further deterioration. The Nigeria Deposit Insurance Corporation took over as liquidator, sealing the bank's offices. The matter dragged through the courts, with the bank's owners eventually being awarded damages of N100 million in February 2009.

In August 2002, Sanusi announced that Nigeria was suspending payments on some of its $33bn foreign debts and was trying to reschedule payments. He blamed the problem on falling oil revenues and failed privatisation plans. Sanusi discussed Nigeria's debt in an opening address at a monetary policy forum in May 2003. He pointed out that debt had risen from 1% of GDP in 1960 to 16.2% in 1980 and 83.6% by the end of 2002. Federal government borrowing from the CBN was causing inflation and exchange rate problems, crowding out private borrowers and thus damping growth. He recommended greater use of the long term capital market rather than the short-term money market, and much greater focus on productive use of the money borrowed to optimise return and avoid building up a problem for future generations.

In 2002, Sanusi was awarded the rank of Commander of the Order of the Niger (CON). In May 2004, Sanusi voluntarily retired and handed over to Charles Chukwuma Soludo.

== Later career ==
On 7 October 2004 he was appointed to the board of directors of Lafarge Africa, a cement manufacturing company in Nigeria owned by Lafarge of Paris. Other post-CBN appointments include Chairman of Standard Chartered Bank Nigeria, First Pension Funds Custodian, Santrust Securities, STI Consulting and Global Biofuels, and Director of West African Portland Cement and Marina Foods.

== Bibliography ==
- Joseph Oladele Sanusi (2001). The Nigerian economy: growth, productivity and the role of monetary policy. Development Policy Centre. ISBN 978-8003-05-2.
