= FinTech Association of Nigeria =

Nigerian financial tech non-profit

FintechNGR
- FinTech Association of Nigeria
- Formation: July 10, 2017; 9 years ago
- Type: Nonprofit
- Legal status: Association
- Purpose: Development of financial technology in Nigeria
- Headquarters: Lagos
- Location: Nigeria
- Members: 471
- Secretary General: Tolulope Oshindero
- President: Ade Bajomo
- Chief operating officer: Babatunde Obrimah
- Website: https://fintechng.org/

FinTech Association of Nigeria, known as FintechNGR, is a Nigeria-based self-regulatory, non-profit, and non-partisan organisation focused on accelerating the growth of financial technology, facilitate investments and create enabling financial technological environment for innovation in Nigeria. Incorporated by Corporate Affairs Commission in 2017, FintechNGR interfaces with Nigeria financial regulators including the Central Bank of Nigeria, Securities and Exchange Commission, National Insurance Commission and the government to achieving its stated objectives. FintechNGR is a member of Global Fintech Hubs Federation and the Africa Fintech Network.

== History ==
The idea for the establishment of FinTech Association of Nigeria was conceived at the 2017 inaugural Nigeria Fintech Week by Segun Aina, chairman of Fintech Associates Ltd who then held discussions with some stakeholders including Ecobank, Proshare, Banwo and Ighodalo. The discussion culminated in the establishment of the organization. On 10 July 2017, FintechNGR was formally incorporated by the Corporate Affairs Commission and the pioneering governing council was established. In 2018, the governing council was expanded to include 13 members and increased to 17 in 2020 and the board established.

=== Governance ===
The organization is governed by a board of trustees and an executive council headed by president, vice president and general secretary and supported by a chief operating officer (COO) who oversees the secretariat of the organization.

== Operations ==
FintechNGR stated objective is to accelerate the growth of financial technology, facilitate investments and create enabling financial technological environment for innovation in Nigeria. It serves as a platform for exchange of ideas in the fintech industry and as the representative of fintech entities in Nigeria. Though a self-regulatory organization, it works with financial and national data regulators including the Central Bank of Nigeria, Securities and Exchange Commission, National Insurance Commission, Nigeria Deposit Insurance Corporation, Nigerian Financial Intelligence Unit, Nigeria Inter-Bank Settlement System, Nigerian Communications Commission and National Data Protection Bureau.

As of April 2024, it has 464 members. In 2021, FintechNGR reported increased adoption of financial technology in Nigeria, stating that 63 per cent of the $1.37 billion in capital funding raised in Nigeria in that fiscal year went to the fintech industry compared to 25 per cent recorded in 2020. In the first quarter of 2023, cashless transactions across fintech entities in Nigeria grew by 44.84 per cent amounting to a total of N126.73 trillion naira up from N87.73 trillion naira in the corresponding period of 2022. But the growth of fintech has also led to increased cyber-attacks against fintech entities. In December 2023, FintechNGR launched a framework to combat rising cases of fraud in the electronic payment system in Nigeria.
