= Ola Vincent =

Governor of the Central Bank of Nigeria
- In office 28 June 1977 – 28 June 1982
- Preceded by: Adamu Ciroma
- Succeeded by: Abdulkadir Ahmed

Personal details
- Born: 16 May 1925 Lagos, Nigeria
- Died: 3 September 2012 (aged 87) Victoria Island, Lagos, Nigeria
- Education: CMS Grammar School; University of Manchester

Olatunde Olabode Vincent (16 May 1925 – 3 September 2012) was a Nigerian economist and banker who was governor of the Central Bank of Nigeria from 1977 to 1982.

== Birth and education ==
Vincent was born on 16 May 1925 in Lagos. He attended CMS Grammar School, Lagos (1936–1939). He served in the Nigerian Armed Forces between 1942 and 1946, and further worked in the Financial Secretary's Office, Lagos between 1946 and 1956. In 1951, he attended the Administrative Staff College in England, and from 1953 to 1956 Vincent studied at the University of Manchester. From 1957 to 1960 he was a part-time lecturer in Economics at the University of Ibadan.

== Banking career ==
Vincent was Senior Assistant Secretary in the Nigerian Ministry of Finance (1959–1961) and then moved to the Central Bank of Nigeria (CBN) as an Assistant general manager, becoming a general manager at the CBN from 1963 to 1966. He was a Director at the Nigerian Industrial Development Bank (1964–1966). Vincent was appointed a Vice-President at the African Development Bank, Abidjan, Côte d'Ivoire (1966–1973). He returned to the CBN in 1973 as an Adviser, becoming Deputy Governor in 1975 and Governor from 1977 to 1982. Vincent was named a Commander of the Federal Republic (CFR) in 1982.

== Later career ==
Following Vincent's retirement from the CBN, in 1983 he recommended establishment of the Nigeria Deposit Insurance Corporation (NDIC), which occurred in June 1988. The NDIC provides a safety net for depositors in the newly liberalised banking sector.

Vincent chaired a seminar on Ethics and Professionalism in the Nigerian Banking Industry in August 1992. In his opening remarks, he observed that banks had a pivotal role in the cash and credit economy of Nigeria, making them vulnerable to suspicion. He acknowledged that greed was a factor in causing the high incidence of fraud and other abuses in the industry. Speaking in April 2003, Vincent criticised the "severely flawed unitarist constitution" that the former military regime had introduced in 1999, and called for changes to "arrest the cancerous growth of corruption and corrupt practices."

He was a director of the Industrial and General Insurance (IGI) in 2008, when he received a prestigious lifetime achievement award. He is a life member of the Nigerian Economic Society and the Society for International Development. In May 2009, he was living in retirement in his home on Victoria Island, Lagos with Adenike, his wife for 50 years. In an interview in September 2009, Vincent was critical of the action of the recently appointed governor of the CBN, Sanusi Lamido Sanusi, who had dismissed the chief executives of five bailed-out banks. He said the executives should have been given a fair hearing, and felt that the hasty action which involved the Economic and Financial Crimes Commission may have undermined trust in the banking system.

== Death ==
Ola Vincent died on Monday, 3 September 2012 in a hospital. He was 87 years old.

== Bibliography ==
- S. Ade Ojo, Ola Vincent (2000). Education, unity and development in Nigeria. Central Educational Service.
- Ola Vincent (2002). Fiscal federalism: the Nigerian experience. Nigerian Economic Society. ISBN 978-2984-25-6.
- Ola Vincent (2005). Ola Vincent's speeches, writings and presentations: 1985–2004. Macmillan Nigeria. ISBN 978-018-465-1.
