= Abdulkadir Ahmed =

Nigerian businessman and civil servant

Governor of the Central Bank of Nigeria
- In office 28 June 1982 – 30 September 1993
- Preceded by: Ola Vincent
- Succeeded by: Paul Agbai Ogwuma

Personal details
- Born: 31 October 1940 Jama'are, Northern Region, British Nigeria (now in Bauchi State, Nigeria)
- Died: 1998 (aged 57–58)

Abdulkadir Ahmed (31 October 1940 – 1998) was a Nigerian businessman and civil servant who was governor of the Central Bank of Nigeria from 1982 to 1993.

== Background ==
Ahmed was born on 31 October 1940 in Jama'are, Bauchi State. He attended Barewa College, Zaria in 1955. He joined the New Nigerian Development Company in January, 1960. Ahmed studied at the University of Ife in 1961. He graduated from South West London College in 1972. Ahmed became Commissioner of Finance for Bauchi state (March 1976 - June 1977). He was appointed a Deputy Governor with the Central Bank of Nigeria in 1977. Before he became Commissioner of Finance, Ahmed had executive experience with Northern Nigeria Development Company (NNDC) and represented the firm in boards of associated companies such as Arewa Textiles Mills, Northern Nigeria Textiles Mills, Cement Company of Northern Nigeria and Arewa Hotels. He joined NNDC in 1960 and was sponsored for training in institutions in Nigeria and abroad. He served as area accountant of the group and in 1974, he became the group's financial controller.

Ahmed was a fellow of the Institute of Chartered and Certified Accountants and the Institute of Chartered Accountants of Nigeria.

== Governor of the Central Bank ==
Ahmed was appointed the Governor of the Bank on 27 June 1982 and retired on 30 September 1993. He held office for over 11 years during democratic government of Shehu Shagari and interim government of Ernest Shonekan, and the military regimes of Generals Muhammadu Buhari and Ibrahim Babangida.

He was the first chairman of the board of the Nigeria Deposit Insurance Corporation when it was established on 15 June 1988.

During his tenure, the Shagari regime awarded contracts for construction of the Kafin Zaki Dam in Bauchi State. Both Ahmed and water resources minister Abubakar Hashidu were natives of the state. The successor government of Military ruler General Sani Abacha cancelled the project and appointed a judicial committee of inquiry. Abacha also set up a panel of inquiry into CBN activities under his predecessors.

In 1988, Governor Ahmed achieved the first debt reduction transaction in the international markets by restructuring the trade arrears of Nigeria into CBN Promissory Notes. The restructuring was done on a voluntary basis, with over 2/3 of the noteholders agreeing to the restructuring at a bondholders meeting at Wembley Conference Centre in London. Governor Ahmed convinced noteholders to accept the debt reduction deal by allowing creditors to set strict terms of default for the notes. The Governor feared that subsequent Nigerian administrations would attempt to renege on the note payments, so he permitted creditors to set very harsh terms of default for the notes. As a result, the Promissory Notes, which totalled over US$5 billion, were paid in full in January 2010, and Nigeria's credit rating has greatly improved as a result. This transaction, and Nigeria's performance on the CBN Notes, allowed Nigeria to restructure another $5 billion of bank debt into Brady Bonds in 1992. Brady Bonds also had an element of debt reduction, which greatly lowered Nigeria foreign exchange cost.

Governor Ahmed then initiated the first comprehensive sovereign debt buyback in the international markets, which further reduced Nigeria's foreign exchange burden, between 1988 and 1993, through an overseas subsidiary company named Greenland Holdings. After allegations of impropriety in the deals, a Senate investigation committee in 2000 exonerated the governor and stated that the deals had been beneficial to the country, reducing foreign debt by $5 billion at an average cost to Nigeria of 32% of the face value of the debt purchased.

== Later career ==
In the early 1990s, Ahmed, bought a first class return ticket for a trip to London with members of his family from British Airways. On the return journey, BA downgraded the former Central Bank governor's ticket to economy class on the basis that he had paid in naira rather than a "hard" currency.
