= Roy Pentelow Fenton =

First governor of the Central Bank of Nigeria

Roy Fenton

1st Governor of the Central Bank of Nigeria
- In office 24 July 1958 – 24 July 1963
- Preceded by: Office established
- Succeeded by: Aliyu Mai-Bornu

Personal details
- Born: 1918 British Empire
- Died: 1979 (aged 60–61)

Roy Pentelow Fenton (1918–1979) was a British economist and banker who served as the first governor of the Central Bank of Nigeria following his appointment by the colonial administration on 24 July 1958 to 24 July 1963. He was succeeded by Aliyu Mai-Bornu.

During his tenure, Fenton established the central bank and its monetary policy. He was best known for his contributions creating the Nigerian foreign exchange system as well as the Nigerian currency. He also introduced the pioneer banking legislation and established the Nigerian Security Printing and Minting Company.

== Biography ==
Fenton was born in 1918. In 1935, he joined the Manchester Savings Bank and worked there until September 1939 when he joined the Lancashire Fusiliers of the British Army. He became the commander of the 5th Battalion of the Kings Own Scottish Borderers. In 1946, he joined the Bank of England where he was later appointed to represent the United Kingdom on the Managing Board of the European Payments Union in Paris, France. In 1958 he established the Central Bank of Nigeria and became its first governor from 1958 to 1963. He was also awarded the Companion of the Order of St Michael and St George. Upon his return from Nigeria, he held various offices including the Deputy Chief of Central Banking Information Department (1963–1964), Deputy Chief of Overseas Department (1964–1965), and Chief of Overseas Department (1965–1975) before his retirement. He became the CEO of Keyser Ullman.

== See also ==
- List of governors of the Central Bank of Nigeria
