= Rank Capital =

Nigerian fintech company

Rank Capital Inc.
- Native name: Rank
- Formerly: Moni Africa, Moni
- Industry: Business Banking; Financial Technology
- Founded: 2021
- Founders: Femi Iromini, Adedapo Sobayo
- Headquarters: Lagos, Nigeria
- Key people: Femi Iromini (CEO); Adedapo Sobayo (CTO)
- Subsidiaries: Rank Microfinance Bank; Rank App
- Website: Website

Rank Capital Inc. (marketed as: Rank; formerly Moni and Moni Africa) is a Nigerian financial technology and investment company. It encompasses various businesses, including Rank Microfinance Bank and Rank App. The company provides wealth-management and investment services, while Rank Microfinance Bank provides banking services. Rank App provides financial services for communities. It was founded in 2021 as Moni by Femi Iromini and Adedapo Sobayo.

On 12 May 2026, Financial Times, listed Rank as one of Africa's Fastest-Growing Companies in 2026.

== History ==
Moni was launched in 2021 and initially focused on group financing for small businesses. Its model used existing community relationships and social trust to organise borrowers into groups and provide access to financing. Y Combinator backed the company, and it participated in the accelerator's program.

Moni's initial business centered on group financing for small businesses, with the company using community structures such as traditional ajo groups as part of its operating model. In 2023, Moni disclosed that it had disbursed nearly ₦67 billion (US$46.62 million) in loans to more than 20,000 businesses and recorded a 96 percent repayment rate.

Moni later expanded from community lending into savings products. The company developed a group-savings model aimed at communities including traders' associations, market unions and neighbourhood cooperatives. TechCabal reported that a pilot of Moni's savings product reached approximately 10,000 business owners and individuals. Participants pooled funds that were invested in government-backed securities such as treasury bills and money-market instruments.

In November 2025, the company rebranded from Moni to Rank and received a switching license from the Central Bank of Nigeria. It announced the acquisition of AjoMoney and Zazzau Microfinance Bank. Following the acquisition, Zazzau Microfinance Bank was renamed Rank Microfinance Bank and became part of its financial services operations.

In 2026, Rank introduced additional community-finance products, including Money Circles, Tribe, and Rank Perks. Money Circles was described as a digital version of rotating savings groups, while Tribe was designed for community financial management and Rank Perks combined workplace savings with credit services.
