= Charles Mordi =

Nigerian economist

Charles N.O. Mordi

Academic background
- Education: University of Lagos (B.Sc.) (M.Sc.)

Academic work
- Discipline: Monetary economics Macroeconomics
- Institutions: Central Bank of Nigeria

Charles N.O. Mordi is a Nigerian economist and former head of research at the Central Bank of Nigeria. He is an authority on the monetary economics of Nigeria.

== Education and career ==
Mordi holds a BSc and M.Sc., both in economics, from the University of Lagos.

His professional career began at the Central Bank of Nigeria in 1980. He then proceeded to the IMF where he became a country economist on the economies of Namibia and Botswana. He was also a member of IMF surveillance missions to Malawi and Lesotho.

Mordi has conducted research on the demand for money in the Nigerian economy.

== Journal articles ==
- Charles N.O. Mordi; Michael A. Adebiyi (2010). "The Asymmetric Effects of Oil Price Shocks on Output and Prices in Nigeria using a Structural VAR Model". Central Bank of Nigeria Economic and Financial Review. 48 (1): 1–32. S2CID 218717.
- Charles N.O. Mordi (2002). "The Challenges of Monetary Union: Risks and pitfalls and how to respond to them". Central Bank of Nigeria Economic & Financial Review. 40: 56–69.
