= Paul Agbai Ogwuma =

Nigerian banker (born 1932)

Governor of the Central Bank of Nigeria
- In office 1 October 1993 – 29 May 1999
- Preceded by: Abdulkadir Ahmed
- Succeeded by: Joseph Oladele Sanusi

Personal details
- Born: 24 April 1932 (age 94) Abayi, Southern Region, British Nigeria (now Abia State, Nigeria)

Paul Agbai Ogwuma (born 24 April 1932) is a Nigerian banker who was Governor of the Central Bank of Nigeria from 1993 to 1999 during the military regime of General Sani Abacha and his successor General Abdulsalami Abubakar.

== Background ==
Ogwuma was born on 24 April 1932 in Abayi, Abia State. He is of Ngwa origin. He studied at New Bethel College, Onitsha, then went to the United Kingdom where he studied at Bradford Institute of Technology and then at Bradford University (1959 - 1962). He was an accountant at the Board of Trade in London (1966 - 1977), and also worked at the Industrial and Commercial Corporation, London (1967-1973). Ogwuma started his banking career in Nigeria in the United Bank for Africa. He later moved to the Union Bank of Nigeria where he retired as Managing Director and Chief Executive Officer in the late 1980s.

== Governor of the Central Bank ==
Ogwuma was appointed Governor of the CBN in September 1993, taking office on 1 October 1993. At the time of his appointment, the bank was struggling to manage foreign exchange resources. Both debt and inflation were high. Ogwuma liquidating 20 distressed banks over a three-year period in an effort to clean up the financial system and restore confidence. He also created improved security for both depositors and investors. In 1995 he proposed creation of the Nigeria Automated Clearing System (NACS) to clear checks and other instruments between banks. NACS eventually started operations in 2002. During the Abubakar period, foreign reserves were allowed to fall from $7.1 billion to under $4 billion in the first few months of 1999, a problem inherited by Ogwumu's successor Joseph Sanusi.

While he was in office, Ogwuma was unknowingly involved in a massive fraud totaling $242 million. A group of fraudsters, one of whom posed as Ogwuma, convinced a senior officer of a Brazilian bank to pay this amount to fund a fictitious contract with the Ministry of Aviation. The fraudsters were eventually brought to trial by the Economic and Financial Crimes Commission under Nuhu Ribadu in 2004. Ogwuma was, of course, in no way involved.

The Central Bank was used as a source of personal funds by General Sani Abacha, military ruler from November 1993 until his sudden death in June 1998. Abacha would tell his National Security Adviser Ismaila Gwarzo to prepare funding requests for fake security projects, which Abacha approved as Head of State. The Central Bank of Nigeria usually sent the funds to Gwarzo in cash or travellers' checks, and Gwarzo took the money to Abacha's house. Sani Abacha's son Mohammed then arranged to launder the money to offshore accounts. An estimated $1.4 billion in cash was delivered in this way. A 2004 newspaper report implied that Ogwuma was complicit in this looting of the CBN by the head of state.

He wrote a journal "The control of the monetary and banking system by the Central Bank of Nigeria".
