= Ade Bajomo =

Nigerian banker and technologist

- Born: Adeolu Bajomo; March 12, 1966 (age 60); Nigeria
- Education: Obafemi Awolowo University and London South Bank University
- Occupation: Banker
- Years active: 1994 -
- Known for: President of FinTech Association of Nigeria

Adeolu Bajomo known as Ade Bajomo is a Nigerian financial technology services and banking executive currently serving as President of FinTech Association of Nigeria since 2020. He previously served as executive director, Information Technology and Operations at Access Bank Plc and on the board of Nigeria Stock Exchange as executive director, Market Operations and Technology.

== Education ==
Ade Bajomo holds a bachelor's degree in Civil Engineering from the University of Ife and a master's degree in Information Systems Engineering from South Bank University, London and an MBA from CASS Business School, London. Bajomo is a chartered member of the British Computer Society and a member of Institute of Directors.

== Career ==
Bajomo began his career in 1994 at Deutsche Bank where he served as Computing Manager and in 1997 moved to Fortis Bank, UK as the IT Director and served there until 2006 when he left to join Pearl Insurance Group as Head of IT Strategy and Systems serving there for just one year. From 2007 to 2011, he worked at Barclays Bank Plc UK as Regional Head of Transformation Programme. Bajomo returned to Nigeria in 2011 to join the Nigeria Stock Exchange (NSE) as Executive Director Market Operations and Technology for a term of five years.

Bajomo introduced several reforms at the NSE including digitalisation of trading systems with the launch of various technologies such as XGEN, XNET and a trading app – Trade Smart and organized the inaugural NSE Market Data Workshop. The market grew to become the second largest stock exchange in Africa by market capitalization with over seven million investors. He was the Chair of Market-Wide Infrastructure and Technology sub-committee of the Nigeria Capital Market Committee and was a board member of NASD Plc (Nigeria's Over the Counter Exchange). He was reappointed by the NSE in 2016 for a second term but resigned in December 2017.

Bajomo was appointed to the board of Access Bank Plc as the executive director, Information Technology and Operations in January 2018. He introduced advanced digital transformation, core banking upgrades and operations automation at the bank leading to growth of its customer base from seven to fifty million emerging as the Africa's largest retail bank by number of customers. Bajomo resigned from the board in 2022.

He currently serves as the President of FinTech Association of Nigeria – a self-regulatory, nonprofit and non-partisan organization focused on accelerating the growth of financial technology in Nigeria. He was Vice President of the association from 2019 to 2020 when he was appointed president.
