= Aliyu Mai-Bornu =

2nd Governor of the Central Bank of Nigeria (1963–1967)

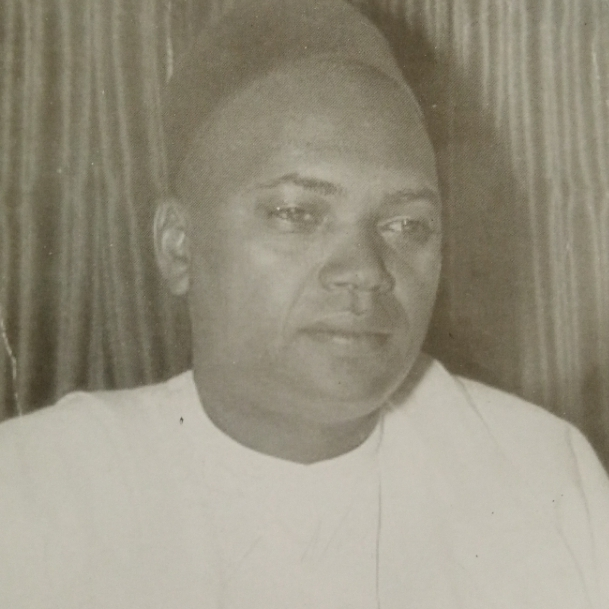

2nd Governor of the Central Bank of Nigeria
- In office 25 July 1963 – 22 June 1967
- Preceded by: Roy Pentelow Fenton
- Succeeded by: Clement Isong

Personal details
- Born: 1919 Yola, Northern Region, British Nigeria
- Died: 23 February 1970 (aged 50–51)
- Education: Barewa College; University of Bristol

Mallam Aliyu Mai-Bornu (1919 – 23 February 1970) was a Nigerian economist who served as the second governor of the Central Bank of Nigeria from 25 July 1963 to 22 June 1967.

== Early life and education ==
Mai-Bornu was born in the town of Yola to parents of Kanuri heritage. His father was a councillor in the Lamido Native Authority and initially opposed Mai-Bornu's attendance of school until he was persuaded by the Lamido to give Mai-Bornu a chance. Mai-Bornu attended Yola Elementary School, Yola Middle School, and was admitted to Kaduna College in 1938, graduating in 1942 as an English language teacher. He started his teaching career at his alma mater, Yola Middle School, from 1942 to 1946 before proceeding to another one of his alma maters, Kaduna College (1946–1952), and soon joined the Northern Teachers Association. In 1952, he returned to Yola as deputy headmaster of the Yola Middle School and later left Yola to be a house tutor at the Veterinary School in Vom for five months. He earned a government scholarship to travel abroad and studied economics at Bristol University in the United Kingdom, graduating in 1957.

== Career ==
Mai-Bornu returned to Nigeria and obtained a post as administrative officer with the Northern Nigeria Public Service (1957–1959) serving in the Public Service Commission and Ministry of Finance and Trade. When the Central Bank started operations in 1959, he was seconded to the Central Bank of Nigeria as an assistant secretary. He rapidly rose through the ranks from assistant secretary to deputy secretary, then secretary. In 1962, he became the first Nigerian to be appointed deputy governor. On 25 July 1963, Mai-Bornu was appointed governor of the Central Bank (1963–1967). After leaving the bank, he was appointed director and general manager of the Nigerian Tobacco Company (1967–1969). He served on the board of directors of the company until his death on 23 February 1970. His portrait features on the 1,000 Naira note brought into circulation on 12 October 2005.
