= Mohammed Santuraki =

Nigerian banker and academic administrator

Pro-chancellor and Chairman of Governing Council of the Federal University of Technology, Minna
- Incumbent
- Assumed office June 2024

Pro-Chancellor and Chairman of Governing Council of the Ibrahim Badamasi Babangida University

Personal details
- Education: Ahmadu Bello University, University of Ibadan
- Occupation: Banker

Mohammed Kudu Santuraki is a Nigerian banker and academic administrator. He currently serves as the Pro-chancellor and Chairman of Governing Council of the Federal University of Technology, Minna, (FUT Minna). He previously served as the Pro-Chancellor and Chairman of Governing Council of the Niger State owned university - Ibrahim Badamasi Babangida University (IBBU) and also as Vice Chairman of the Committee of Pro-chancellors of State universities in Nigeria. Santuraki was Managing Director and Chief Executive Officer of Bank of Agriculture Limited and FBN Mortgages Limited. He is an adjunct professor of Corporate Governance & Business Ethics at the University of Abuja Business School.

== Education ==
Mohammed Santuraki attended Ahmadu Bello University (ABU), Zaria for his first degree and earned his MBA from University of Ibadan (UI). An alumnus of Lagos Business School, he earned executive and leadership certificates from MIT Sloan Executive Education, Said Business School (University of Oxford), Lee Kuan Yew School of Public Policy, Harvard Business School, Harvard Kennedy School of Government, Stanford Graduate School of Business, Wharton School of University of Pennsylvania, United States and Kellogg Executive Programs’ (Northwestern University).

== Career ==
Santuraki started his banking career as a credit and marketing manager at Meridien Equity Bank before joining The British Council in Nigeria, Guaranty Trust Bank, First Bank of Nigeria where he held executive positions. He served as Managing Director at First Bank of Nigeria Mortgages Limited and as CEO of Bank of Agriculture, Nigeria’s apex agricultural development finance institution. He was Vice President of Mortgage Bankers Association of Nigeria (MBAN) and Chairman of Association of Nigerian Development Finance Institutions.

Following his exit from banking sector, he was appointed Pro-chancellor and Chairman of the Governing Council of Ibrahim Badamasi Babangida University (IBBU) – Niger state owned university and served as the Vice Chairman of the Committee of Pro-chancellors of state universities in Nigeria. In June 2024, President Bola Ahmed Tinubu appointed Santuraki Pro-chancellor and Chairman of Governing Council of Federal University of Technology Minna.
