= AfriGO =

Financial Service

Afrigopay Financial Services Limited
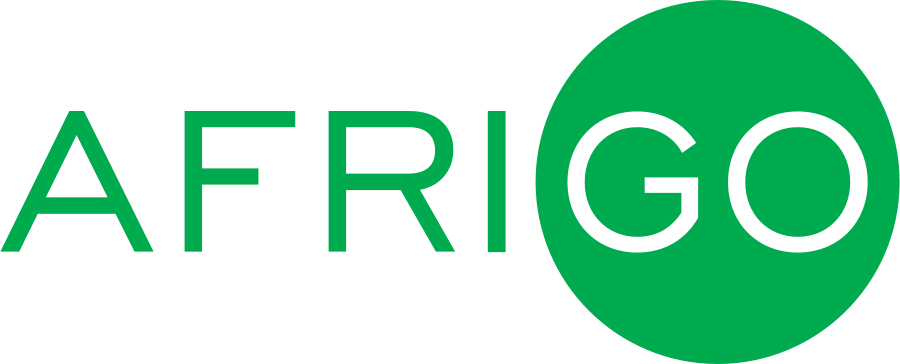
- Type: Subsidiary
- Industry: Financial Services
- Founded: 2023; 3 years ago
- Headquarters: Lagos, Nigeria
- Area served: Nigeria
- Key people: Ebehijie Momoh (MD/CEO) Ugo Obasi (ED/CCO)
- Products: Credit Cards
- Parent: Nigeria Inter-Bank Settlement System (NIBSS)
- Website: afrigopay.com.ng

AfriGo also known as AfriGoPay is a national domestic payment card scheme introduced by the Central Bank of Nigeria (CBN) in partnership with the Nigeria Inter-Bank Settlement System (NIBSS) to strengthen Nigeria's payment infrastructure, reduce reliance on international card networks, lower transaction costs, enhance data sovereignty, and financial inclusion.

AfriGO is a subsidiary of the Nigeria Inter-Bank Settlement System (NIBSS), owned and operated by AfriGoPay Financial Services Limited (AFSL). The scheme serves as Nigeria's sovereign domestic card network transactions within Nigeria. The initiative aims to reduce dependency on international card brands such as Visa and Mastercard, as well as Nigeria's privately owned Verve.

== History ==
With persistent global foreign exchange challenges, the central Bank of Nigeria (CBN) developed a domestic card scheme inn partnership with the Nigeria Inter-Bank Settlement System (NIBSS) to introduce another major player and reduce the gap of unbanked Nigerians, despite an existing payment card ecosystem dominated by international payment networks, including Visa and Mastercard, alongside Verve, a domestic card scheme operated by Interswitch.

AfriGO is the first national domestic card scheme if its kind in Africa to be launched by a national government. According to the Central Bank, AfriGo was designated to;

- Reduce transaction processing costs
- Strengthen Nigeria's payment sovereignty
- Reduce dependence on foreign exchange for domestic card transactions
- Improve financial inclusion
- Encourage local innovation in payment technology
- Support Nigeria's cashless economy initiative

AfriGO was officially unveiled on 26 January 2023 by the former Governor of the Central Bank of Nigeria, Godwin Emefiele, in Abuja, Nigeria, in partnership with NIBSS, the Bankers' Committee, and stakeholders across Nigeria's financial service industry.

== Adoption and milestones ==
The scheme has achieved significant adoption since its inception, with Access Bank becoming the first commercial bank to issue a live AfriGO card in March 2023. Other financial institutions have since joined as issuing partners, with AfriGO cards now accepted at over 16,000 ATMs and 70% of POS terminals in Nigeria.

By 2025, NIBSS reported that more than one million AfriGO cards had been issued, while transaction values exceeded ₦70 billion.

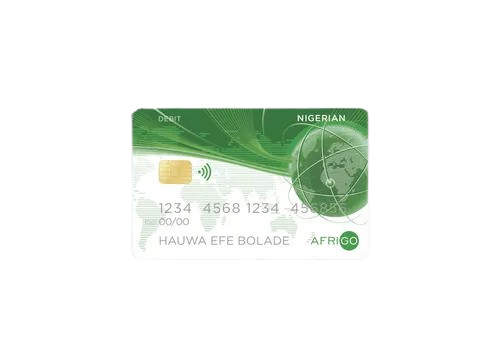
AfriGOPay Debit Card sample

=== Products and Services ===
AfriGO offers several payment products, including:

- Debit Cards
- Prepaid Cards
- Credit Cards
- VirtualCard
- Contactless Cards
