= Sarafa Tunji Ishola =

Nigerian politician (born 1960)

Sarafadeen Tunji Ishola

Nigerian High Commissioner to the United Kingdom
- In office January, 2021 – September, 2023

Personal details
- Born: 25 November 1960 (age 65)

Sarafadeen Tunji Ishola is a Nigerian politician who served as the Nigerian High Commissioner to the United Kingdom. He was appointed to the position by President Muhammadu Buhari in January 2021. On September 2, 2023, President Bola Tinubu recalled Ishola, along with other Nigerian ambassadors, as part of a broader diplomatic reshuffle. He was succeeded by Cyprian T. Heen.

== Early life and education ==
Sarafa Ishola was born on 25 November 1960 in Abeokuta, Ogun State, Nigeria, to Alhaji Ibrahim Ishola Tairu and Alhaja Amudalat Ajiun Ishola.

After secondary school, Ishola worked in pharmaceutical sales at Wellcome Nigeria Limited and earned a marketing diploma from The Chartered Institute of Marketing. In 1981, he completed an investment course at Southwest London College in the United Kingdom.

In 1983, Ishola served the National Youth Service Corps in Kaduna State, teaching economics, marketing, and business statistics at the Federal College of Education, Katsina.

In 2009, Ishola attended the Leaders in Development programme at Harvard Kennedy School, Harvard University, Cambridge, Massachusetts. In 2011, he enrolled in an MBA programme at the University of Ilorin, Kwara State.

== Public service ==
Sarafa Tunji Ishola was elected chairman of Abeokuta North Local Government in 1997 and served until 1998. During this period, he chaired the Conference of Local Government Council Chairmen in Ogun State.

In 1999, he was appointed special assistant to the Minister of State for Finance, Jubril Martins-Kuye, and served until 2003. In June 2003, Governor Gbenga Daniel appointed Ishola as Secretary to the Ogun State Government.

On 26 July 2007, President Umaru Musa Yar'Adua appointed Ishola as Minister of Mines and Steel Development, and he served until he left the cabinet on 29 October 2008 following a ministerial reshuffle.

On 1 July 2020, President Muhammadu Buhari named Ishola among the non career ambassador designates, and the Senate process concluded later that month. He was posted as Nigeria's High Commissioner to the United Kingdom on 13 January 2021 and assumed duties later that year, with his tenure ending upon recall in 2023.
