= 1992 Nigerian Senate elections in Ogun State =

1992 Nigerian Senate election in Ogun State

The 1992 Nigerian Senate election in Ogun State was held on July 4, 1992, to elect members of the Nigerian Senate to represent Ogun State. Monsurudeen Osholake representing Ogun Central, Ayodeji Otegbola representing Ogun West and Jubril Martins-Kuye representing Ogun East all won on the platform of the Social Democratic Party.

== Overview ==
Affiliation	Party		Total
Affiliation	SDP	NRC	Total
Before Election			3
After Election	3	0	3

== Summary ==
District	Incumbent	Party	Elected Senator	Party
Ogun Central			Monsurudeen Osholake	SDP
Ogun West			Ayodeji Otegbola	SDP
Ogun East			Jubril Martins-Kuye	SDP

== Results ==
=== Ogun Central ===
The election was won by Monsurudeen Osholake of the Social Democratic Party.

1992 Nigerian Senate election in Ogun State
Party	Candidate	Votes	%
SDP	Monsurudeen Osholake		
Total votes			
SDP hold			

=== Ogun West ===
The election was won by Ayodeji Otegbola of the Social Democratic Party.

1992 Nigerian Senate election in Ogun State
Party	Candidate	Votes	%
SDP	Ayodeji Otegbola		
Total votes			
SDP hold			

=== Ogun East ===
The election was won by Jubril Martins-Kuye of the Social Democratic Party.

1992 Nigerian Senate election in Ogun State
Party	Candidate	Votes	%
SDP	Jubril Martins-Kuye		
Total votes			
SDP hold			
