= CIBN =

CIBN may refer to:

- Chartered Institute of Bankers of Nigeria, professional organization for bankers in Nigeria
- China International Broadcasting Network, Chinese media company
