= Zero COT =

Zero Commission on Turnover (COT), according to the Central Bank of Nigeria (CBN), is the removal of commission on all customer-induced debit transactions by Deposit Money Banks (DMBs) in the country. The Zero COT commenced in Nigeria on 1 January 2016. The CBN through the Revised Guide to Bank Charges (RGBC) of 1 April 2013, provides gradual steps towards the application of this policy. The guide stipulated a phase-out plan from =N=3 (2013), to =N=2 (2014), to =N=1 (2015) and =N=0 (2016). Also, the policy permits customers to negotiable COT in each of the relevant year subject to the maximum stated in the plan.

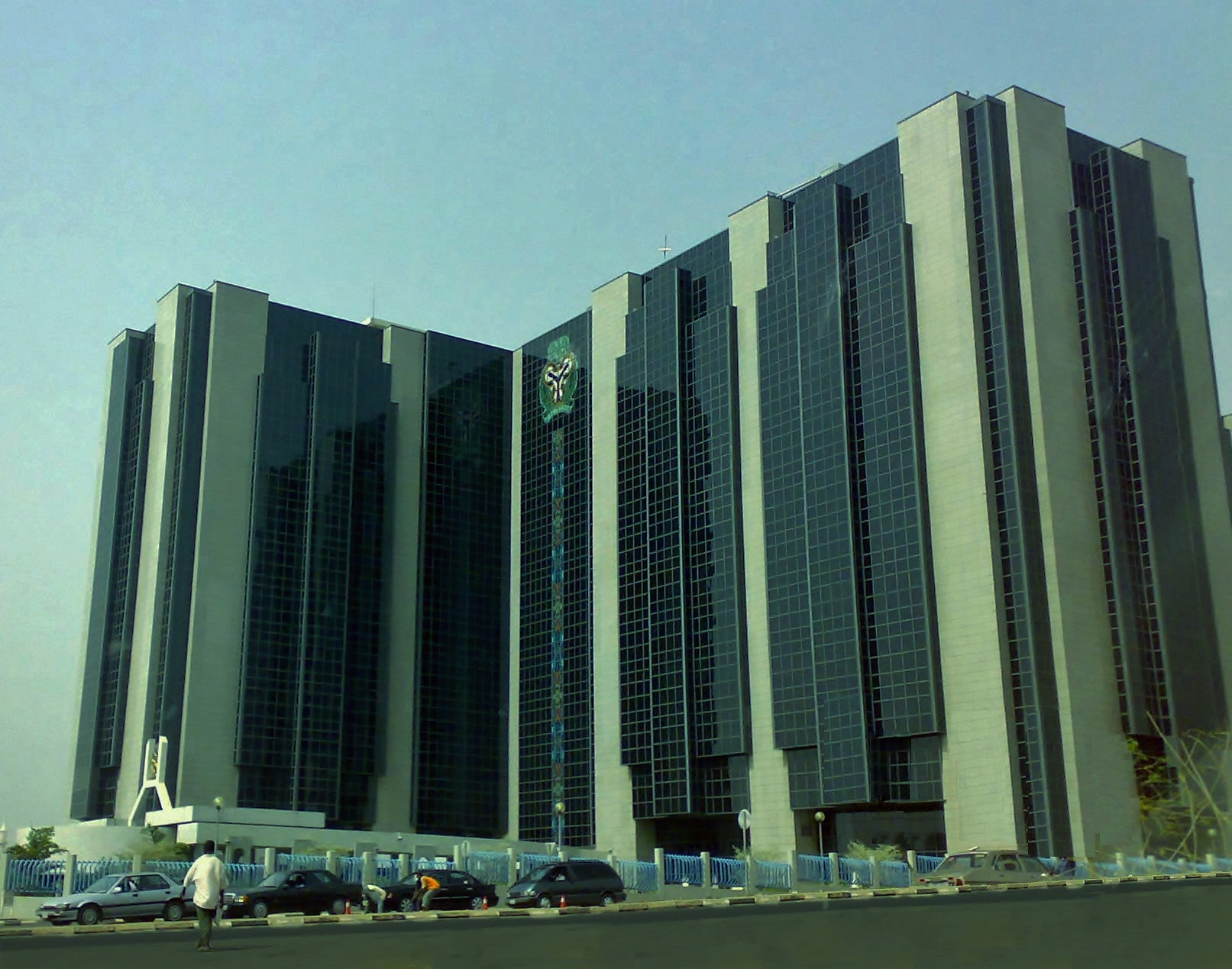
Central bank Nigeria

== Overview ==
The Guide to Bank Charges was introduced in 2014 to provide a standardized means of bank charges on all products and services between customers and DMBs in the country. The guide was revised on 1 April 2013 in order to accommodate current developments in the banking industry. The guide is the compilation of all charges on all services and products rendered by the DMBs and their applications. The policy was established to boost the lost confidence of Nigerians in the banking industry. Financial experts believe, the application of the policy will drag more people into the financial net. In January 2016, the monetary regulatory body noticed the persistence in charging the banned charges by the DMBs. This led to the committee in charge of Bank and Currency in the House of Representatives (HOR) to demand for immediate refund of all COT charges from 1 January 2016.

== Implementation ==
The implementation of Zero COT started in Nigeria on 1 January 2016. This policy was initiated via a circular called RGBC from CBN to all the DMBs in the country on 1 April 2013. The CBN provided a graduating plan which provide for the removal of the COT on all induced debit transactions by the bank to be removed from 2013 thus; =N=3 in 2013 to =N=2 in 2014 and =N=1 in 2015 and zero =N= in 2016. This plan was arranged to provide a soft landing for all the DMBs in order to cushion the effect of one-off removal from their Net profits while the burden suffered by customers due to the effect of these charges are removed. The policy had received the backing of many Nigerian financial experts. Mr. Femi Ekundayo, a financial expert and former president of Chartered Institute of Bankers of Nigeria (CIBN) said “The Central Bank of Nigeria (CBN) policy on financial inclusion is to get more people into the financial net”.

== House of Representatives and Zero COT ==
The HOR in Nigeria has decided that all COT charged by all DMBs after the deadline stipulated by the RGBC from all customers in the country must be refunded. The house gave a thirty-day ultimatum for the perfection of this motion. A committee on Bank and Currency was organised by the house to look into the implementation of this policy. According to Edward Gyang Pwajok, a house member representing People Democratic Party (PDP) from Plateau, the zero COT policy intended to be used by CBN to boost the economy is not being implemented by the banks because the CBN has not directed that it be implemented.
