= Bank of Agriculture =

Nigerian government-sponsored development bank

- Type: State owned company
- Industry: Finance
- Predecessor: National Agriculture and Cooperative Bank, People's Bank and the Family Economic Advancement Project
- Founded: 2000; 26 years ago
- Headquarters: Kaduna, Nigeria
- Key people: Alwan Ali Hassan (Managing Director/CEO)
- Products: Loans
- Owner: Nigerian Federal Ministry of Finance (60%) and Central Bank of Nigeria (40%)
- Website: boanig.com

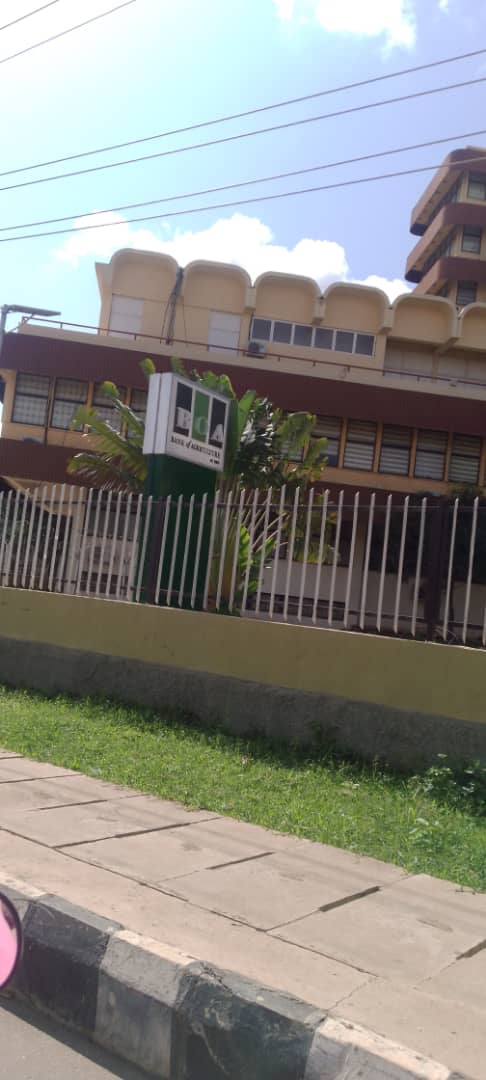
Bank of Agriculture (BOA)

Bank of Agriculture is a Nigerian government sponsored development bank that provides credit facilities to both small and large scale farmers and small businesses within rural areas. An outcome of a restructuring of government sponsored microcredit institutions, the bank was formed in 2000 and assumed the assets of the National Agriculture and Cooperative Bank, People's Bank and the Family Economic Advancement Project.

== History ==
BOA's history can be traced to the establishment of Nigerian Agriculture Bank (NAB) in 1972 which became operational in 1973. NAB was a government initiative to fund agriculture development projects in the country, in particular small-scale farm holders that may not have enough collateral to obtain credit facilities from commercial banks. At the time, many farmers were considered high risk borrowers by commercial lenders and NAB was established to provide Microcredit to small farmers and on-lending to agricultural firms.

In 1977, when Umaru Mutallab was cooperatives minister, the government of Nigeria (FGN) initiated new guidelines for financing cooperatives. In addition, FGN provided additional capital to NAB to support cooperative societies in the country. Subsequently, NAB was transformed to become the Nigerian Agriculture and Cooperative Bank. The government also specified new guidelines for commercial banks to set aside a minimum percentage of their loan portfolio to the agricultural sector. Banks that were unable to meet the threshold transferred the remainder of funds to the central bank for onward disbursement to farmers through NACB.

=== Status ===
The Bank has the potential to make positive impacts in a Nation with natural endowments for arable farming, vast irrigation resources, good weather and over 30% of the populace falling within the youthful age group.

In 2000, the government merged the activities of NACB, People's Bank and Family Economic Advancement Programme to form the Nigerian Agriculture, Cooperative and Rural Development Bank. Prior to the merger, All three entities engaged in micro-financing.

BOA has struggled to control the number of non-performing loans in its portfolio, which has hampered its ability to provide sustainable support to the agricultural sector.

== Leadership ==
On April 4, 2025, President Bola Tinubu appointed Mr. Ayo Sotinrin as the new Managing Director of the Bank of Agriculture (BOA). The appointment was confirmed by Bayo Onanuga, the President’s Special Adviser on Information and Strategy.

== Proposed merging ==
The federal government of Nigeria has proposed the merging of bank of agriculture (BOA), together with the Central Bank of Nigeria’s NIRSAL Microfinance, which is a CBN body.
