= Cash-less Nigeria =

Cash-less Nigeria is a policy established in the year 2012 by the Central Bank of Nigeria to curb excesses in the handling of cash in the Nigerian federation. It prescribed a cash handling charges on daily withdrawal above five hundred thousand Naira (N500,000.00) for individuals and three million Naira for corporate bodies (N3, 000,000.00). The policy was enforced not to eliminate the use of cash, but to reduce the volume of cash in circulation.

== The operation of the policy ==
A pilot run of the policy started on 1 January 2012 in Lagos State. The service charges were with held until 30 March of the same year to allow for seamless migration from manual to electronic devices. The second stage of the pilot run started in Rivers, Anambra, Abia, Kano State, Ogun and the Federal Capital Territory on 1 July 2013, while the program nationwide started a year later on 31 July 2014.

== The key notes of the policy ==
- Withdrawal above N150,000.00 on all third party cheques can only receive value through a clearing house and not across the counter.
- Under this policy a bank is no longer permitted to pick up cash services from merchants, while only the licensed cash in transit companies are permitted.
- 3% cumulative charges are administered on daily cumulative withdrawals in excess of N500,000.00 for individuals while 5% cumulative charges are administered on daily cumulative withdrawals in excess of N3,000.000.00
- The charges on these transactions are borne by the account holder.
