= Verve International =

Payment card brand

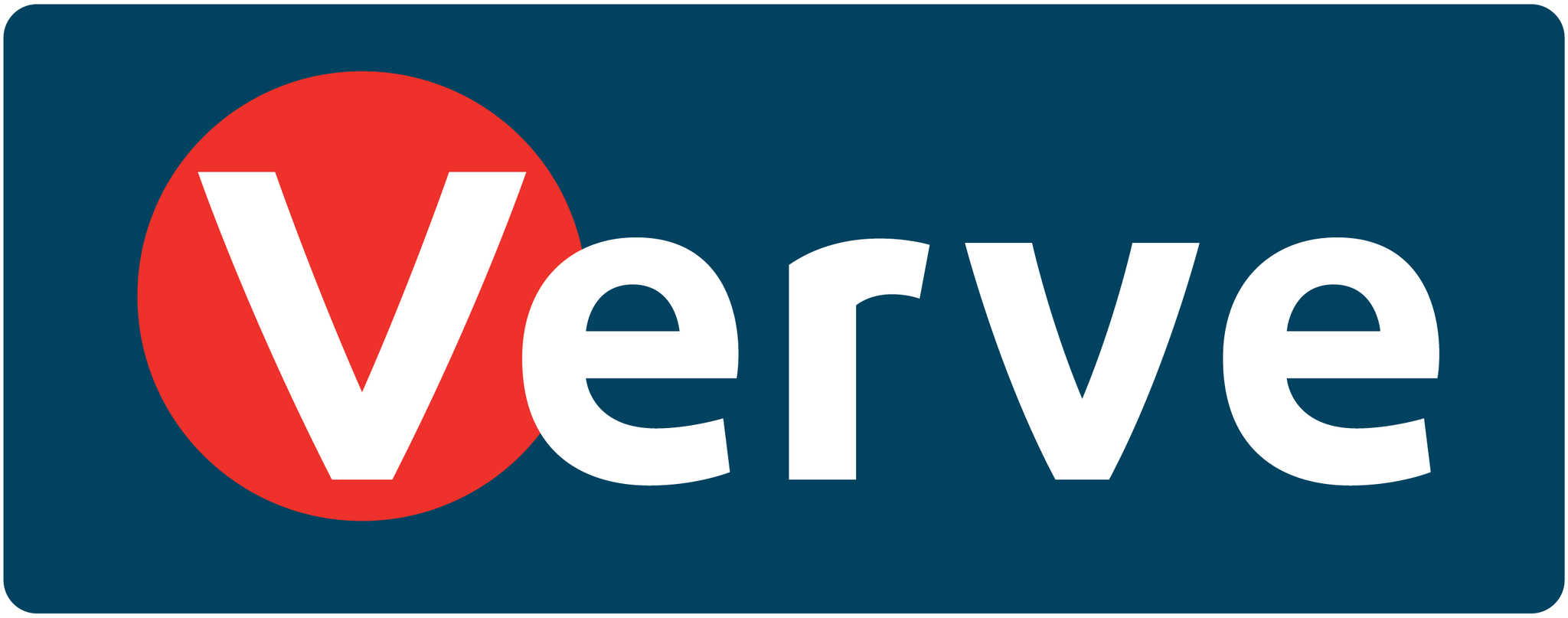
- Type: Private company
- Industry: Financial Technology
- Founded: 2009; 17 years ago
- Headquarters: Lagos, Nigeria
- Key people: Mitchell Elegbe, GMD/CEO; Charles Ifedi, Mike Ogbalu III, CEO
- Services: Payment service provider
- Website: myverveworld.com

Verve International is a Nigerian Pan-African and multinational financial technology and payment card brand owned by Interswitch Group.

== History ==
Verve was founded in 2009, as a subsidiary of Interswitch. In 2013, it became an autonomous business entity in a restructuring exercise.

In 2005 the Central Bank of Nigeria (CBN) issued a mandate to the Nigerian payment industry that operators should migrate from magnetic strip to EMV chip and PIN platform by 2009. The CBN migration policy was adopted to phase out the magnetic strip when the technology became susceptible to fraudulent transactions. It initially issued six million cards in partnership with several Nigerian banks.

Verve offers card products in Nigeria. In 2013 Verve was reported to have "over 20 million cards in circulation and access over 119,631 points of sale terminals, 11,287 ATMs and over 1,000 online merchants."

In March 2013, Discover Financial Services partnered with Interswitch, which enabled the acceptance of Verve Cards across the Discover global network, covering 185 countries and territories as at the time of the agreement. The alliance also allowed acceptance of Discover and Diners Club International (DCI) Cards at Interswitch-enabled ATM and point-of-sale (POS) terminals for purchases in Nigeria.

A media report in 2015 said "Verve is issued by 40 banks in Africa with more than 30 million payment tokens in circulation." In October same year, Verve launched its entry into the East African payment market with strategic partnership with Kenya Commercial Bank (KCB) "to expand Verve Card acceptance and payment services in six key East African markets", namely: Kenya, Tanzania, Burundi, South Sudan, Rwanda and Uganda.

== See also ==
- Financial Technology
- Online payment system
