= South West London College =

Coordinates: 51.435°N 0.138°W

The South West London College was a higher education college located in the Tooting and Streatham areas of London, England.

The college was founded in 1966, and closed in 1990; initially it was proposed that it would be merged with the Thames Polytechnic, but eventually it was dissolved under the 1988 Education Reform Act. Most of the college's staff and faculty moved to the South Bank Polytechnic.

== Notable alumni ==
- Abdulkadir Ahmed, former Governor of the Central Bank of Nigeria
- Elizabeth Alpha-Lavalie, Sierra Leonean politician
- Adam Kilgarriff, corpus linguist, lexicographer and co-author of Sketch Engine
- Joseph Oladele Sanusi, former Governor of the Central Bank of Nigeria
- Sarafa Tunji Ishola, Nigerian High Commissioner to the United Kingdom
