= Interswitch =

Nigerian financial service company

- Type: Public
- Industry: Fintech
- Founded: 2002
- Headquarters: Lagos, Nigeria
- Key people: Mitchell Elegbe (Group Managing Director & Chief Executive Officer)
- Website: www.interswitchgroup.com

Interswitch is an integrated payment and digital commerce platform company headquartered in Lagos, Nigeria. Founded in 2002 in Nigeria, as a transaction switching and processing company with national focus, Interswitch progressively evolved to incorporate consumer financial services with the successive launches of Quickteller, a retail payments ecosystem linking merchants and billers with consumers, as well as Verve, a homegrown, EMV-certified payments card scheme.

== History ==
After using an ATM for the first time in Scotland, Mitchell Elegbe developed an idea to create electronic payment infrastructure in Nigeria while he was working on implementing SWIFT. Working at Telnet, his boss approved the transaction switch. However most players he sold to were not interested in the software for switching; this led him to creating Interswitch so as to meet his targets. With the assistance of Accenture, Elegbe and his team established the company, of which he then became CEO. In 2010 two thirds of the company was sold to a consortium led by Helios Investment Partners. In 2011 Interswitch took a 60 per cent stake in Bankom in Uganda.

In 2013 Interswitch entered into an agreement for payment processing with Discover Financial Services.

In September 2014 the company acquired a majority shareholding in Paynet Group, an East-African payments provider.

In 2015 Interswitch launched a $10m investment fund for African start-ups in the payments sector.

In February 2018, Interswitch unveiled its SPAK National Science Competition to promote and reward excellence in Science, Technology, Engineering and Mathematics in Nigeria.

In January 2023, the Central Bank of Nigeria (CBN) issued one of its first Payments Service Holding Company (PSHC) License to Interswitch.

== Operations and subsidiaries ==
The Interswitch company was established as, common African financial services provider and maintains exclusively, a wide array of interconnected datacenters in Africa. The company has over 11,000 ATMs on its network, with more users in Nigeria than anywhere else.

Verve, a payment card industry is another subsidiary of Interswitch. Verve has also been launched in Kenya.

Interswitch also owns Quickteller, originally cited as a Telecommunication airtime vendor, additionally, providing payments services.

Interswitch uses network security systems and firewalls to protect its data. These tools are features used by the company to maintain its own network infrastructure.

In October 2020, Quickteller launched the Qtrybe community, a community of 50 exceptional students from Nigerian tertiary institutions to serve as ambassadors of Quickteller and Interswitch on their campuses.

It also operates quicksilver, the leading B2c bill payment and disbursement platform in Nigeria and provides a variety of other technology and financial Inclusion service.
