= Governor of the Central Bank of Nigeria =

- Incumbent; Yemi Cardoso since 15 September 2023
- Central Bank of Nigeria
- Style: Mr. Governor
- Member of: Board of Governors
- Reports to: President of Nigeria; Nigerian Senate
- Seat: CBN Building; Abuja
- Appointer: The president with Senate advice and consent
- Constituting instrument: CBN Act
- Formation: July 24, 1958; 68 years ago
- First holder: Roy Pentelow Fenton
- Deputy: Deputy governor of the Central Bank of Nigeria

The Governor of the Central Bank of Nigeria is the head of the Central Bank of Nigeria, and is the active executive officer of the Board of Governors of the Central Bank. The governor presides at meetings of the Board.

The governor is nominated by the president of Nigeria and confirmed by the Nigerian Senate; the officeholder serves concurrently as a member of the Board of Governors. Roy Pentelow Fenton was the first governor who served from 24 July 1958 to 24 July 1963. He handed over to Aliyu Mai-Bornu (1919–1970), who became the first Nigerian governor. Abdulkadir Ahmed (1940–1997) served as the longest officeholder from 28 June 1982 to 30 September 1993.

Yemi Cardoso was appointed as governor on 15 September 2023 by President Bola Tinubu.

== Appointment ==
As stipulated by the Central Bank of Nigeria Act of 2007, the governor is chosen by the president with the confirmation of the Senate.

== List of governors ==
The following is a list of past and present governors of the Central Bank of Nigeria. Since CBN was established in 1958, the following people have served as governor.

#	Portrait	Name (birth–death)	Term of office		Tenure length	Appointed by
#	Portrait	Name (birth–death)	Start of term	End of term	Tenure length	Appointed by
1		Roy Pentelow Fenton (1918–1979)	24 July 1958	24 July 1963	5 years, 0 days	ex officio
2		Aliyu Mai-Bornu (1919–1970)	25 July 1963	22 June 1967	3 years, 332 days	Abubakar Tafawa Balewa
3		Clement Isong (1920–2000)	15 August 1967	22 September 1975	8 years, 38 days	Yakubu Gowon
4		Adamu Ciroma (1934–2018)	24 September 1975	28 June 1977	1 year, 277 days	Murtala Muhammed
5		Ola Vincent (1925–2012)	28 June 1977	28 June 1982	5 years, 0 days	Olusegun Obasanjo
6		Abdulkadir Ahmed (1940–1997)	28 June 1982	30 September 1993	11 years, 94 days	Shehu Shagari; Ibrahim Babangida
7		Paul Agbai Ogwuma (born 1932)	1 October 1993	29 May 1999	5 years, 240 days	Ernest Shonekan
8		Joseph Oladele Sanusi (born 1938)	29 May 1999	29 May 2004	5 years, 0 days	Olusegun Obasanjo
9		Charles Soludo (born 1960)	29 May 2004	29 May 2009	5 years, 0 days	Olusegun Obasanjo
10		Sanusi Lamido Sanusi (born 1961)	3 June 2009	20 February 2014	4 years, 262 days	Umaru Musa Yar'Adua
–		Sarah Alade	20 February 2014	3 June 2014	103 days	Goodluck Jonathan
11		Godwin Emefiele (born 1961)	3 June 2014	9 June 2023	9 years, 6 days	Goodluck Jonathan; Muhammadu Buhari
–		Folashodun Shonubi (born 1962)	9 June 2023	15 September 2023	98 days	Bola Tinubu
12		Olayemi Cardoso (born 1957)	15 September 2023	Incumbent	2 years, 357 days	Bola Tinubu
