= Elizabeth Alpha-Lavalie =

Sierra Leonean politician (1947–2013)

Elizabeth Tygsona Alpha-Lavalie (5 January 1947 – 15 December 2013) was a Sierra Leonean politician. She was a member of the Sierra Leone People's Party and was one of the representatives in the Parliament of Sierra Leone for Bo District, serving as member of parliament from 1996 to 2012.

== Early life and career ==
Alpha-Lavalie was born on 5 January 1947. Her father was Joseph Emman Henry Tucker, who served as a Sierra Leone People's Party (SLPP) Member of Parliament for Bo South, and served as deputy speaker of the parliament from 1961 to 1967. Her mother was Vivat Edith Letitia Tucker, who worked as a midwife and farmer. Alpha-Lavalie became active in politics at the age of 20, joining the SLPP and supporting her father. When Siaka Stevens declared a one-party state and assumed the presidency in 1971, the SLPP was driven underground.

Alpha-Lavalie began her career in 1968, in the banking industry. She worked for three years for the Standard Chartered Bank in Sierra Leone, before moving to the United Kingdom where she earned a degree in banking, from the South West London College. In 1975, she returned to Sierra Leone, and was re-employed by Standard Chartered, at the time one of the few professionally trained bankers in the country. In 1987, she moved to the National Development Bank, remaining with them until 1996.

== Political career ==
Alpha-Lavalie entered politics in 1996, contesting and winning the constituency of Bo South to become a member of the Sierra Leone parliament. She was immediately appointed to office, chairing the Health and Social Services Committee from 1996 to 1997 and the Finance Committee from 1996 to 2002. She was elected as the Deputy Speaker for the parliament in 2001, and in that role she chaired the Public Accounts Committee and also the Defense and Security Committee. She remained deputy speaker until 2007.

She was re-elected as MP in the 2002 and 2007 elections, before standing down as an MP in 2012.

== Personal life and death ==
Elizabeth Alpha-Lavalie was married to Dr. Alpha Mohamed Lavalie, a political activist who founded the Eastern Region Defence Committee following the 1992 Sierra Leonean coup d'état. She died on 15 December 2013, at the age of 66, following a month-long coma.
