= InterswitchSPAK =

Nigerian television science contest

- Created by: Oladapo Ojo
- Based on: High School Science Curriculum (STEM)
- Developed by: JustMedia Productions
- Written by: Ogugua Dopamu
- Directed by: Oladapo Ojo
- Presented by: Khadijah Abu (2017), Onyinye Okwundu (Season 1.0 NG), Hero Daniels (Season 2.0 NG), Faith Maina (Season 1.0 KE)
- Country of origin: Nigeria
- Original language: English
- No. of seasons: 5
- No. of episodes: 16

Production
- Executive producers: Mitchell Elegbe, Cherry Eromosele, Oladapo Ojo
- Producers: Ogugua Dopamu, Funmi Oladapo-Ojo
- Editors: Joseph Onyia, Sam Oriabor, Bisola Akinwande, Jacob Abiiki, Austine Ogar
- Running time: 30 minutes (2017 - 2023)
- Production company: JustMedia Productions

Original release
- Release: 2017

InterswitchSPAK National Science Competition is a High School Science Television contest show that started in Nigeria. It debuted in 2017 as SPAK (an acronym for Speed; Perseverance; Accuracy and Knowledge).

The 360^{o} engagement platform is created by Oladapo Ojo and developed by JustMedia Productions for Interswitch Group.

This initiative is designed to support and encourage the study of STEM (Science, Technology, Engineering and Mathematics) across Africa.

From a national qualifying examination across the country, the best students with excellent skills get to qualify for the second stage of the Competition, emerging from a nationwide written examination. These 81 students from Nigeria and 54 from Kenya are then split into 9 groups; 9 students and 6 students respectively, to carry out the InterswitchSPAK Innovation Challenge, with the winning group receiving the Founders Award.

== History ==
The SPAK initiative began in 2017 as a national science competition for senior secondary schools in Nigeria. It is a Corporate Social Responsibility (CSR) project produced by JustMedia Productions. The year 2018 marked a total turn-around for the initiative as Interswitch Group became the exclusive headline sponsor of the project thereby expanding it (duration/timing) coupled with bigger and more robust rewards to the winners of the competition. In 2019, it was expanded to East Africa starting with Kenya.

The competition is designed to test the ability of each student in the sciences, with the sole objective of promoting the study of STEM subjects in Africa.

The competition is in two Phases – the Phase 1 is the iSPAK National Qualifying written Examination/test and the Phase 2 is made up of: InterswitchSPAK MasterClass, InterswitchSPAK Innovation Challenge and the main TV Show

=== InterswitchSPAK National Qualifying Exams ===
Each of the interested schools across the nation is expected to register their representatives (online only): their six(6) Year 11 best students in STEM subjects.

To support the girl-child initiative, each mixed school must have at least two female students – amongst the six(6) that would represent them.

Each school is to prepare their representatives for the qualifying exams in four subjects – Mathematics, Physics, Chemistry & Biology based on the current Year 11 WAEC/NECO and KCSE syllabuses as applicable.

On a pre-determined date annually in April for Nigeria and May for Kenya, we will have all the students across both countries write an aptitude test (100 questions in 75 minutes) to determine the best 81 or 54 students across the nation to qualify for the next stage of the Competition. Even though the schools registered the students, the competition is strictly individual.

=== InterswitchSPAK MasterClass ===
The InterswitchSPAK MasterClass is that part of the program designed to further develop the minds of these outstanding students.

The MasterClass exposes them to real life experiences shared by top notch speakers, thereby laying a foundation for solid careers for them.

YEAR	NIGERIA		YEAR	KENYA	
YEAR	SPEAKERS	TOPIC	YEAR	SPEAKERS	TOPIC
2018	Mitchell Elegbe (The Founder/Group Managing Director of Interswitch Group)	“Emotional Intelligence and the Leadership Responsibility of Youths”.	2018		
2018	Yinka Sanni (Chief Executive of Stanbic IBTC Holding)	“Social Innovation”: The powers of transformative ideas”	2018		
2018	Eloho Omame (Managing Director and CEO, Endeavor Nigeria)	“Entrepreneurship: A tool to creating impact in the society”.	2018		
2019	Mitchell Elegbe (The Founder/Group Managing Director of Interswitch Group)	"Can i trust you?"	2019	Mitchell Elegbe (The Founder/Group Managing Director of Interswitch Group)	“Can I trust you?”
2019	Dr. Brown Ola Orekunrin (MD Flying Doctors, Nigeria)	"Entrepreneurship-creating sustainable impact by solving social problems"	2019	Agnes Gathaiya	"STEM and the future of work"
2019	Dr. Jumoke Oduwole (SSA to the President on Industry) represented by Ayokunnu Ojeniyi (Executive Assistant, Industry, Trade and Investment)	“A Collaborative Approach to Social Innovation”	2019	Moses-Musyoka Muthui (Country Strategy Director, Barclays kenya)	“Opportunities beyond the lab”

=== InterswitchSPAK Innovation Challenge ===
As part of the line-up of activities for the Stage II of InterswitchSPAK National Science Competition, the “InterswitchSPAK Innovation Challenge” has the students work in teams (of 9 each) on a project where they are required to proffer solutions to a societal problem in the country.

The InterswitchSPAK Innovation Challenge was introduced to inspire and motivate students to think out-of-the-box in solving problems and pushing the limits of innovation to address Africa’s many challenges.

Each of the teams was expected to analyse a problem in the society, and to present the best possible solution to this problem, leveraging on technology. Topics are allocated to each team, and with the assistance of team captains assigned to them, they were expected to work on the assigned topics, identify key challenges, proffer the best solution to the problem and present it as a team on the main TV show.

The topics over the years are given in the table below:

2018	2019
“Propose a solution to address the problems facing Nigeria public transport system, leveraging technology”.	“Looking at the entire Agricultural Value, identify a problem and proffer a solution using Technology”
“Applying technology, propose a solution that will help promote learning beyond a formal institution, as a tool to tackling the out-of-school issue prevalent in our society”.	“How can we effectively adopt technology to improve the transparency of our electoral processes”
“With the aid of technology, propose a solution that promotes an all-inclusive health insurance scheme in Nigeria.”	“How can we maximize technology to provide financial services to the majority of the unbanked Nigerians”

The winners of the InterswitchSPAK Innovation Challenge are awarded the Founder's Award with benefits, such as individual laptops, all-paid vocational jobs at Interswitch Group plus an invitation to an exclusive dinner event with top officials of the Interswitch Group and other industry leaders.

=== InterswitchSPAK TV show ===
The Main TV Show sees these 81 students drawn up into nine (9) groups based on their scores from the National Qualifying Exam. Each of the 9 groups will have students battle amongst themselves to determine the three (3) qualifiers from each group that would move into the semis. At the semifinals, the best three (3) from each of the three (3) groups would qualify for the final, and at the final (i.e. the end), the overall Best STEM student would emerge.

The InterswitchSPAK stage II is mostly focused on the following pure sciences: General Sciences, Mathematics, Physics, Chemistry, and Biology. However, an understanding of Geography, ICT and General knowledge is also helpful.

Various awards/educational scholarships are given to the winning students, schools, teachers and their states’ Ministries of Education.

The annual prize money for the top three students is N12.5m worth of university scholarships.

All students who make it to the TV quiz competition stage would get certificates of participation.

The table below shows previous winners of InterswitchSPAK TV Quiz since its inception in 2017, alongside the names of their schools.

Year	Name	Position	School
2024 (NG)	Ndudu Ekong Henry	1st	Pegasus School, Akwa Ibom
2024 (NG)	Eric Denyefa Omare	2nd	St. Gregory’s College, Lagos
2024 (NG)	David Umeojiaka	3rd	Graceland International School
2024 (KE)	Carl Mwangi	1st	High School, Kiganjo
2024 (KE)	Hamza Kamrudin	2nd	Friends School, Nyeri County
2024 (KE)	Ignatius Suswa	3rd	Nairobi School, Nairobi County
2023 (NG)	Abraham Daramola	1st	Hallmark Secondary School, Ondo
2023 (NG)	Emmanuel Omoegbelaghan	2nd	The Crescent International High School, Ogun
2023 (NG)	Emmanuel Angelo-Hyuwa	3rd	The Ambassadors College, Ota
2023 (KE)	Kiarie Muranga	1st	Light Academy Boy's, Nairobi
2023 (KE)	Emmanuel Mwaura	2nd	Kagumo Boys High School, Nyeri
2023 (KE)	Emmanuel Otieno	3rd	Agoro Sare High School, Homa bay
2022 (NG)	Oreveoghene Wiskey	1st	Top Faith International School, Akwa Ibom
2022 (NG)	Adesayo Elumoro	2nd	The Ambassadors College, Ota
2022 (NG)	Precious Akinyemi	3rd	Rhema Chapel International College, Oyo
2022 (KE)	Hussein Gufu	1st	Maranda High School, Siaya
2022 (KE)	Danson Koraiki	2nd	Kapsabet High School, Nandi
2022 (KE)	Ronnie Andieri	3rd	Kagumo High School, Nyeri
2021 (NG)	Jubril Dokun	1st	Brainfield College, Lagos
2021 (NG)	Jesuferanmi Ayanlade	2nd	Obafemi Awolowo University International School, Osun
2021 (NG)	Qudus Omoniyi	3rd	Scholars Universal Secondary School, Ogun
2021 (KE)	Carl Mwangi	1st	Kagumo High School, Nyeri
2021 (KE)	Hamza Kamrudin	2nd	Friends School Kamulsinga, Bugoma
2021 (KE)	Ignatius Suswa	3rd	Nairobi School, Nairobi
2019 (NG)	Oyindamola Aje	1st	Jesuit Memorial College, Rivers
2019 (NG)	Oluwatobi Ojo	2nd	Apt Scholars Universal College, Ogun
2019 (NG)	Onyekachi Madumere	3rd	Scholars Universal Secondary School, Ogun
2019 (KE)	Jemimah Achieng	1st	Asumbi Girls High School, Homa bay
2019 (KE)	Norbert Pkiach	2nd	Maranda High School, Siaya
2019 (KE)	Ashley Mudenyo	3rd	Alliance Girls High School, Kiambu
2018	Akachukwu Anumudu	1st	Apostolic Faith Secondary School, Lagos
2018	Henry Umunna	2nd	Loyola Jesuit College, Abuja
2018	Onyedikachi Kanu	3rd	Dority International Secondary School, Aba
2017	Ayobami Ahmed	1st	Scholars Universal Secondary School, Ota
2017	Aminu Abdulsalam	2nd	The Ambassadors College, Ota
2017	Samuel Amoko	3rd	Hallmark Secondary School, Ondo

=== InterswitchSPAK students registration (Nigeria) ===
COUNTRY	NIGERIA		KENYA		TOTAL
COUNTRY	Male	Female	Male	Female	TOTAL
2017	3,076	2,965	----	----	6,041
2018	5,759	5,653	----	----	11,412
2019	8,836	8,624	591	765	18,816
