= Savannah Bank =

Nigerian bank

Logo of Savannah Bank.

The Savannah Bank is a Nigerian bank whose license was withdrawn in February 2002 and restored in February 2009 after protracted legal battles.

An investor, International Resource Associates of London, bought 67.35% of the shares of Savannah Bank in 1999, and on 14 April 2000, the bank came under new management. Some prominent people associated with the bank were Senator Jim Nwobodo, a shareholder and chairman, Senator Felix Kolawole Bajomo, an executive director, and Shettima Mustapha, a Federal Minister and board member, but not a shareholder. The Savannah Bank was among Nigeria's top 10 financial institutions.

The bank's licence was withdrawn by the Central Bank of Nigeria (CBN) on 15 February 2002. The CBN Governor Joseph Oladele Sanusi said the bank did not have enough assets to meet liabilities, did not comply with CBN obligations, and that the regulators had been unable to prevent further deterioration. The Nigeria Deposit Insurance Corporation took over as liquidator, sealing the bank's offices. At the time it was closed, the bank had 140 branches. The bank's owners fought the closure in court. In a ruling on 20 October 2006, the Abuja High Court said the CBN had acted properly in revoking the bank's licence. Further appeals followed.

On 6 February 2009 a Court of Appeal sitting in Abuja ordered the re-opening of Savannah Bank, and ordered the CBN and NDIC to pay N100 million to the bank as damages. Richard Abrahams of the Bank of America was appointed chairman of the interim Board of Directors. Jim Nwobodo said the new Savannah Bank would be launched carefully to ensure emergence of a world class and competitive institution. It was reported in February 2010 that the bank's owners might be trying to raise over N100 billion via an international private placement, and the bank was ready to buy up non-performing branches of troubled banks across the country.

== See also ==
- List of banks in Nigeria
- Economy of Nigeria
