= Central Bank of Nigeria Act 1958 =

The Central Bank of Nigeria Act 1958 (No 24) or CBN Act established the Central Bank of Nigeria. The bank commenced operations on July 1, 1959.

The Central Bank of Nigeria Act 1958 was repealed by section 54(2) of the Central Bank of Nigeria Decree 1991. It in turn was replaced by the Central Bank of Nigeria Act 2007.
