= Jubril Martins-Kuye =

Nigerian politician (1942–2021)

Federal Minister of Commerce and Industry
- In office 6 April 2010 – 2011
- Preceded by: Achike Udenwa

Personal details
- Born: 16 August 1942 Ago Iwoye, Ogun State, Nigeria
- Died: 17 January 2021 (aged 78) Ago Iwoye, Ogun State, Nigeria

Jubril Martins-Kuye (16 August 1942 – 17 January 2021) was a Nigerian politician. After studying in Nigeria and the United States he qualified as an accountant before entering politics. Martins-Kuye was originally a member of the Social Democratic Party and served as a senator. He joined the United Nigeria Congress Party (UNCP) towards the end of the Sani Abacha regime. After unsuccessfully standing as the People's Democratic Party candidate for governor of Ogun State in 1999 he was appointed minister of state for finance by President Olusegun Obasanjo, a position he held until 2003. In 2010 he became minister of commerce and industry in the cabinet of Acting President Goodluck Jonathan, holding office until 2011.

Jubril Martins-Kuye’s children

Jubril Martins-Kuye had a total of nine children. Four sons and five daughters born in the following order:

Engr Mobolaji Kuye, Yewande Kuye, Dr. Gbolahan Kuye, Oluwamuyiwa Kuye, Omoboyede Kuye, Halimah Martins-Kuye, Abdullateef Martins-Kuye, Khadijah Martins-Kuye, Wuraola Martins-Kuye

== Early career ==
Martins-Kuye was born on 16 August 1942 in Ago Iwoye, Ijebu constituency of Ogun State, he has a brother (Muraino Ademola Kuye). He studied sociology at the University of Ibadan (1965–1968) and then Economics at the Harvard University Business School, graduating in 1983. Martins-Kuye afterwards qualified as a Chartered Accountant.

Martins-Kuye was a member of the Social Democratic Party (SDP) and was a senator in the Nigerian Third Republic.

== Obasanjo and Yar'Adua presidencies ==
Martins-Kuye became a member of the United Nigeria Congress Party (UNCP) towards the end of the Sani Abacha regime. He was a candidate on the People's Democratic Party (PDP) platform for governor of Ogun State in 1999, but did not win. Martins-Kuye was appointed Minister of State for Finance in June 1999 during the first term of President Olusegun Obasanjo, serving until June 2003. During his tenure, the Savannah Bank was closed down in February 2002, a controversial move that he claimed was due to non-compliance with regulations rather than financial distress. In July 2002, as Minister of Finance, he announced that Nigeria's GDP had grown by 4% annually by the World Bank's estimate, the highest rate for ten years.

Martins-Kuye described himself as a god-father of Ogun politics, leading the conservative group of the Ogun State PDP. He claimed to have installed Gbenga Daniel as governor, but by 2010 had become an opponent of Daniel.

== Minister for Commerce and Industry ==
Martins-Kuye was nominated as minister of Commerce and Industry in March 2010 by Acting President Goodluck Jonathan. This was controversial, since he had apparently not been on the list of ministerial nominees from Ogun State submitted by Governor Gbenga Daniel. Some leaders of the PDP state chapter wrote a petition protesting the nomination to the national PDP chairman, Prince Vincent Ogbulafor. On assuming office on 6 April 2010 Martins-Kuye called for a 100% improvement in the quality of implementation of the nation's budget. He also called for expenditure on programmes and projects that would impact directly on the living standard of the people.

== Retirement and death ==
Martins-Kuye ceased to be a minister in 2011. He died in Ago Iwoye on 17 January 2021.
