= Chartered Institute of Bankers of Nigeria =

Nigerian professional body

- Abbreviation: CIBN
- Formation: November 28, 1963; 62 years ago
- Headquarters: Lagos, Nigeria
- President: Dele Alabi, Ph.D, FCIB.
- Website: www.cibng.org

The Chartered Institute of Bankers of Nigeria (CIBN) is the umbrella professional body for bankers in Nigeria. The CIBN was incorporated in 1976 as the Nigerian Institute of Bankers. It was chartered in 1990, and is now covered by the CIBN Act 5 of 2007. The institute is authorized to regulate the banking profession, set standards for bankers, and to maintain professional ethics through sanctions against members. Corporate members include the Central Bank of Nigeria, the Nigeria Deposit Insurance Corporation and all Deposit Money Banks, Development Banks, Mortgage Banks, Micro Finance Banks and Discount Houses in Nigeria.

== History ==
The Chartered Institute of Bankers of Nigeria was established in 1963 as the Lagos Local Centre, Institute of Bankers, London. It was in incorporated in 1976 as the Nigerian Institute of Bankers, a company Limited by Guarantee. The Institute attained Chartered status and became The Chartered Institute Of Bankers of Nigeria through Act 12 of 1990 which was repealed and re-enacted as CIBN Act No 5 of 2007.

Key dates in CIBN history include:

- November 28, 1963: 124 bankers gathered at Randle Hall, Surulere, Lagos, and passed a resolution for the establishment of Lagos Local Centre of the Institute of Bankers, London.
- 1963: Mr. D.A. Macleod was the 1st Chairman of the Lagos Local Centre of the Institute of Bankers, London.
- 1965: Chief Collins K. N. Obih, FCIB became the 1st Nigerian Chairman of the Lagos Local Centre of the Institute of Bankers, London.
- 1967: Mr. G. H. Griffin, FCIB was the last foreign Chairman of the Lagos Local Centre of the Institute of Bankers, London.
- 1971: Ahmadu Bello University became the first established educational institution to start a banking education programming leading to the award of Diploma in Banking, which served as prelude to AIB (Now ACIB).
- 1972: University of Lagos followed with a Degree programme in Finance.
- August 18, 1973: Nigerian Institute of Bankers was established.
- 1973: Chief F.A Ijewere, FCIB was the President of Nigerian Institute of Bankers. He held the chairman position of the Lagos Local Centre, Institute of Bankers, London, concurrently. The NIB Library was established. Alhaji G. G. Olorun-rinu was the 1st Administrative Secretary.
- 1974: Alhaji A. O. G. Otti, FCIB was the last Chairman of the Lagos Local Centre, Institute of Bankers, London.
- December 15, 1976: Nigerian Institute of Bankers was incorporated as a company limited by guarantee.
- 1977: The Institute became operational and autonomous from the Institute of Bankers, London. Conducted 1st exam in Lagos Local Centre, Institute of Bankers, London. The Nigerian Institute of Bankers took over the conduct of the AIB Examination in Nigeria from the Institute of Bankers London.
- 1978: A Syllabus Sub-committee of the Education Committee drafted the first Syllabus for the ACIB Examinations in Nigeria. The 1st Examinations (Part 1) of the Nigerian Institute of Bankers were conducted.
- 1979: The Institute served in Special Committees including the Committee on Government Finance inaugurated by the 2nd Republic National Assembly.
- 1980: The ACIB Part II Examinations Syllabus was introduced.
- 1982: Alhaji S.A.O Sule, FCIB, was President of the institute.
- 1983: The Association of Professional Women Bankers (APWB) was formed. Chief Mrs. M. O. Sokenu, became the 1st Chairman of APWB.
- 1984: The Institute commenced the conduct of ACIB Part II Examinations.
- November 6, 1987: Gen. Ibrahim B. Babangida, President/Commander-in-Chief of the Armed Forces of the Federal Republic of Nigeria, commissioned Bankers House, at PC 19, Adeola Hopewell, Victoria Island, Lagos.
- 1988: The Staff strength of the Institute rose to 159 from 4 staff in 1973
- 1990: The Institute initiated its 10 Year Development Plan. The Northern Zonal Office was established in Kaduna. The office was later relocated to Abuja in 2001.
- May 18, 1990: The Federal Government Decree No. 12 of 1990 gave the Institute its 'Chartered Status'.
- 1992: Chief (Dr.) F.A.Z. Adekanye, President & Chairman of Council, was elected the 1st President of Association of Banking Institutes of West Africa (ABIWA).
- 1993: The Eastern Zonal Office was established with office in Aba, Abia State. The office was later moved to Owerri, Imo State in 2013.
- 1998: Conducted the 1st Treasurers Dealership Certificate Examinations. Conducted the 1st Examinations in Financial Journalism in conjunction with Nigerian Institute of Journalism.
- October 2001: The Institute held the 1st National Seminar on Banking and Allied Matters for Judges in collaboration with the National Judicial Institute.
- November 2004: The Institute introduced Honorary Senior Members (HCIB) category.
- April, 2006: The Institute conducted the 1st Certificate in Banking Examinations.
- 2006: Mrs. Juliet A. Madubueze, FCIB, OON was 1st Female President of the institute.
- April 11, 2007: The Chartered Institute of Bankers of Nigeria got her new Act No. 5 of 2007 which was signed into law by Chief Olusegun Aremu Obasanjo, GCFR, President/Commander-in-Chief of the Armed Forces of the Federal Republic of Nigeria.
- October 2007: The Institute held the 1st Banking and Finance Conference.
- October 30, 2007: The Body of Past Presidents was inaugurated.
- June 26, 2008: The Body of Banks CEOs was inaugurated.
- 2008: The Institute began the registration of Microfinance Banks in Nigeria as corporate members.
- January 13, 2009: Mr. Jacobs M. Ajekigbe, OFR, FCIB, GMD/CE, First Bank of Nigeria Plc, delivered the 1st CIBN Valedictory Lecture.
- February 2009: The Institute organized the 1st Seminar for Directors of Microfinance Banks.

== Publications ==
- Ralph Oluwole Osayameh; Wole Adewunmi; Femi Adekanye (1993). The crusade for a profession: a history of the CIBN, 1963-1993. CIBN. ISBN 978-32627-1-8.
- Wole Adewunmi (1998). Ethics in the financial services business: presidential address. CIBN. ISBN 978-34165-2-9.
- N. M. Ogubunka (2002). Risk & internal control management in financial institutions. CIBN.
- CIBN, National Judicial Institute (Nigeria) (2002). proceedings of the National Seminar on Banking and Allied Matters for Judges. CIBN. ISBN 978-34165-8-8.
- CIBN, Mascot Communications (2004). Nigerian banks and corporate social responsibility. The CIBN Press Limited. ISBN 978-37278-2-6.
- CIBN, National Judicial Institute (Nigeria) (2005). Proceedings of the 2004 National Seminar on Banking and Allied Matters for Judges, Volume 2004. CIBN. ISBN 978-37278-3-4.

== See also ==
- List of banks in Nigeria
- Institute of Chartered Accountants of Nigeria
- Association of National Accountants of Nigeria (ANAN)
