= Bank Verification Number =

Identification system for Nigerian banks

The Bank Verification Number commonly called BVN is a biometric identification system implemented by the Central Bank of Nigeria to curb or reduce illegal banking transactions in Nigeria. It is a modern security measure in line with the Central Bank of Nigeria Act 1958 to reduce fraud in the banking system.

The system works by recording fingerprints and a facial photograph of the client.

The BVN or Bank verification number is an 11-digit number that is unique to each individual, but the same across all bank institutions for the same individual.

There have been some controversies about the security implication of having all bank accounts in different banks linked to one number, but the BVN has come to stay.

Issues arose where fraudsters attempted to use the launch of the system to phish for customers' bank details.
