= Nigeria Deposit Insurance Corporation =

Nigeria Insurance Corporation

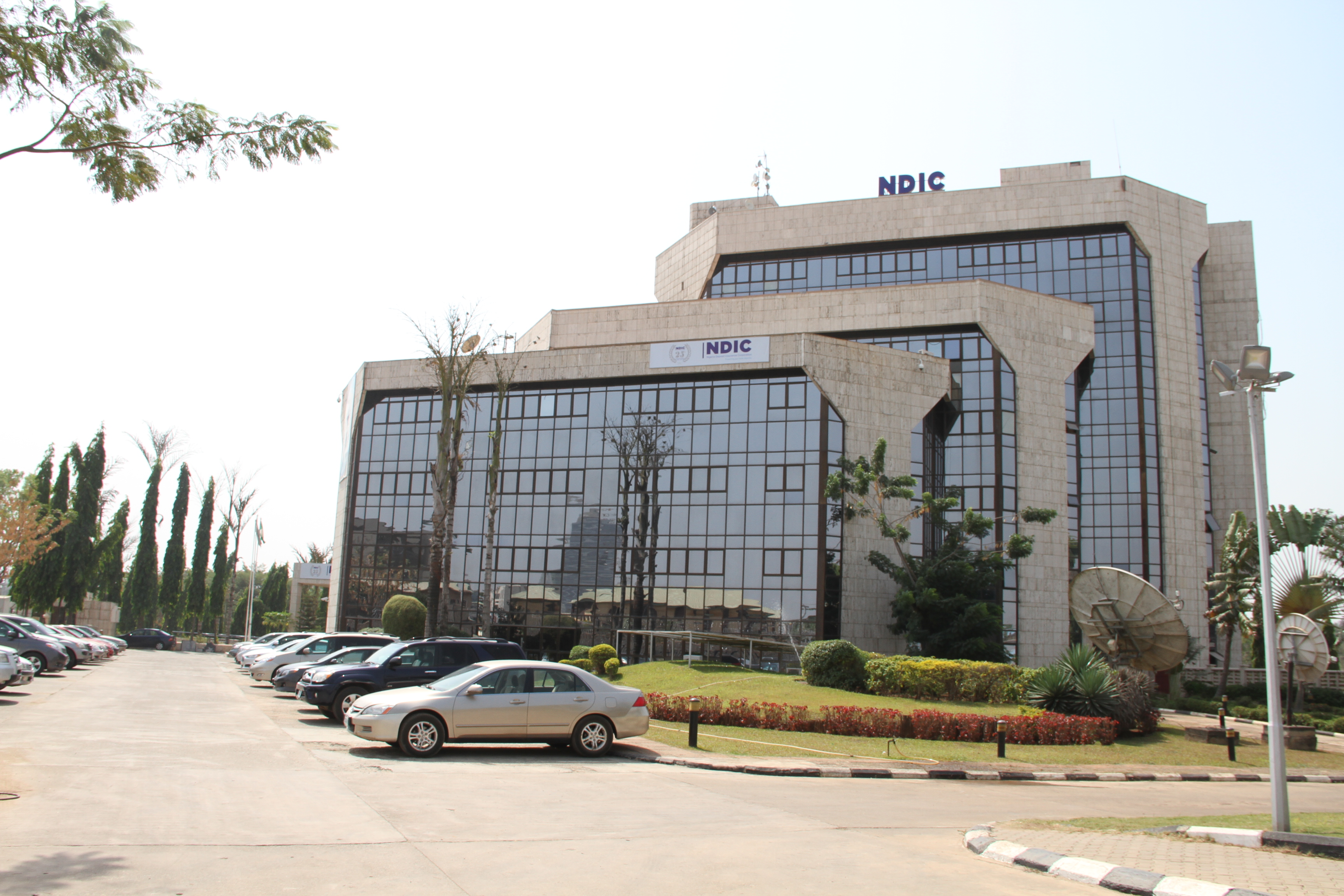
- NDIC Head Office Building Abuja
- Formation: 15 June 1988
- Type: Regulatory body
- Purpose: To protect depositors' funds and ensure the safety and soundness of the Nigerian banking system
- Headquarters: Abuja, Nigeria
- Location: Nigeria
- Official language: English
- Managing Director/CEO: Thompson Oludare Sunday
- Website: http://www.ndic.gov.ng/

The Nigeria Deposit Insurance Corporation (NDIC) is a statutory body established by NDIC Act No. 16 of 2006 with exclusive mandate of administering the Deposit Insurance System (DIS) in Nigeria. As one of the components of the nation's financial safety-net arrangement, the NDIC has the responsibility of protecting depositors and guaranteeing the payment of insured sums when the license of a deposit-taking financial institution is revoked by the Central Bank of Nigeria (CBN)..

== Organization ==
The NDIC is a parastatal under the Nigerian Ministry of Finance. The corporation is charged with protecting the banking system from instability occasioned by runs and loss of depositors' confidence. It operates under the Nigeria Deposit Insurance Corporation Act (1990). The NDIC is a member of the Financial Reporting Council of Nigeria. The NDIC complements the regulatory and supervisory role of the Central Bank of Nigeria (CBN), although it reports to the Federal Ministry of Finance. The NDIC advises the CBN in the liquidation of distressed banks and manages distressed banks' assets until they are fully liquidated.

The NDIC has a supervisory role over insured banks. In April 1996, the Chief Executive of NDIC said that the corporation had 514 case files of insider abuse and corruption for the police to prosecute. In December 2007, the NDIC announced that as of January 1, 2008 it would start providing deposit insurance services to microfinance institutions in Nigeria.

== Activities ==
In February 2002, the governor of the Central Bank, Joseph Oladele Sanusi, issued a notice revoking the license of Savannah Bank, saying the bank did not have enough assets to meet liabilities and did not comply with CBN obligations, and that the regulators had to prevent further deterioration. The NDIC took over as liquidator, sealing the bank's offices. The matter dragged through the courts, with the bank's owners eventually being awarded damages of N100 million in February 2009.

Under a Purchase & Assumption arrangement, the NDIC may arrange for the assets and liabilities of a failed bank to be taken over by another bank. For example, in October 2007 the United Bank for Africa assumed the fixed assets and private sector deposit liabilities of African Express Bank under direction of the CBN and the NDIC.

At times, the NDIC has been caught up in controversy over legal actions against managers and others who have caused insured banks to fail. Shortly before his retirement in July 2009, the Nigeria Deposit Insurance Corporation accused the Inspector General of Police Mike Okiro of failing to repay a N166 million loan he obtained between 2000 and 2001 from the Lead Bank, since liquidated.
