= Central Bank of Nigeria =

State-owned bank in Nigeria

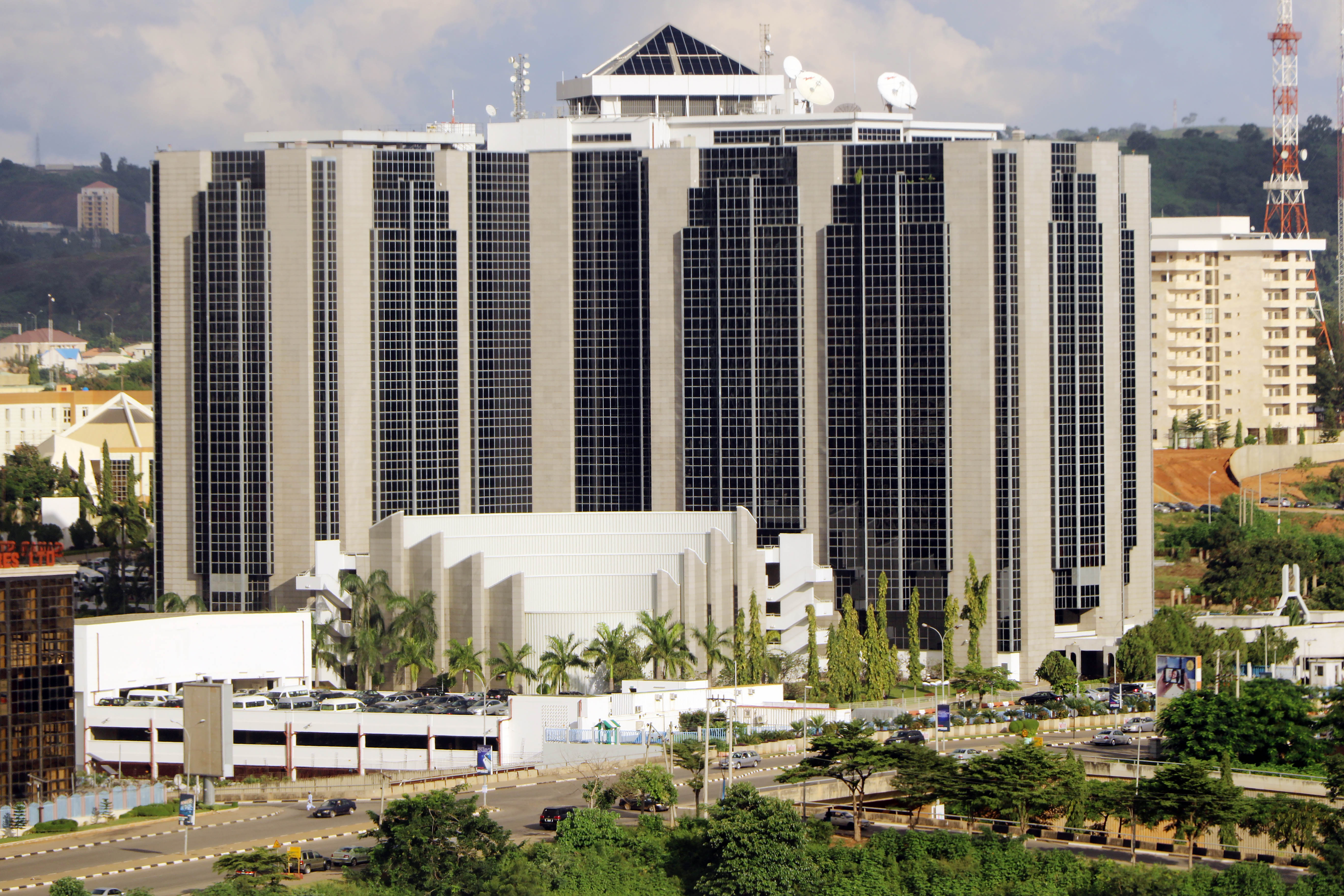
- The Central Bank of Nigeria Headquarters in 2017
- Central bank of: Nigeria
- Headquarters: Abuja, FCT, Nigeria
- Established: 1958 (68 years ago)
- Ownership: 100% state-owned
- Governor: Olayemi Cardoso
- Currency: Nigerian naira NGN (ISO 4217)
- Reserves: 40 billion USD
- Bank rate: 18.7% (July 2023)
- Website: cbn.gov.ng

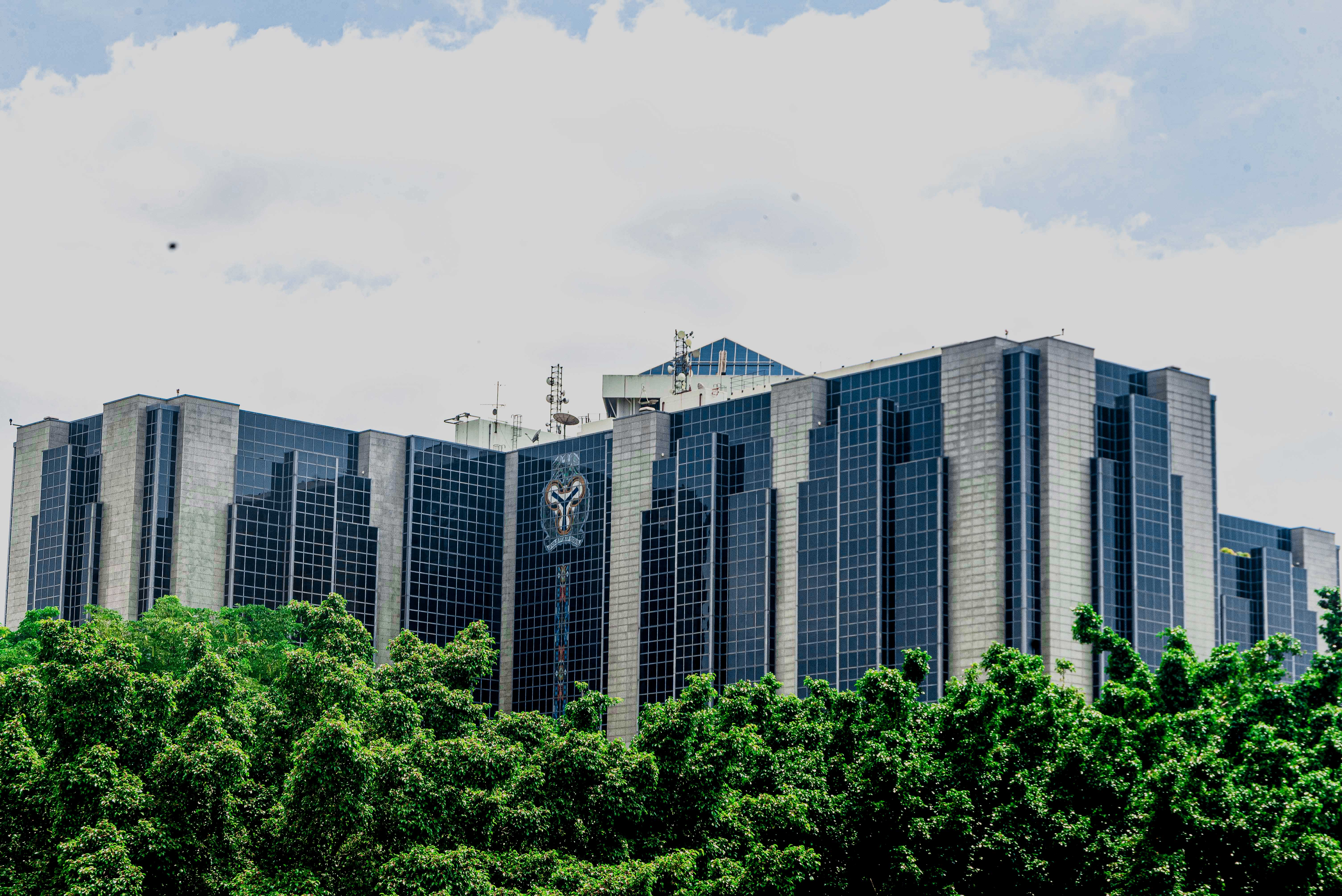
CBN HQ Abuja

The Central Bank of Nigeria (CBN) is the central bank and apex monetary authority of Nigeria established by the CBN Act of 1958 and commenced operations on 1 July 1959. The major regulatory objectives of the bank as stated in the CBN Act are to: maintain the external reserves of the country; promote monetary stability and a sound financial environment, and act as a banker of last resort and financial adviser to the federal government. The central bank's role as lender of last resort and adviser to the federal government has sometimes pushed it into murky political controversies. After the end of colonial rule, the desire of the government to become proactive in the development of the economy became visible, especially after the end of the Nigerian Civil War, the bank followed the government's desire and took a determined effort to supplement any show shortfalls, credit allocations to the real sector. The bank became involved in lending directly to consumers, contravening its original intention to work through commercial banks in activities involving consumer lending.

However, the policy was an offspring of the indigenization policy at the time. Nevertheless, the government through the central bank has been actively involved in building the nation's money and equity centres, forming securities regulatory boards, and introducing treasury instruments into the capital market. The bank has thirty-six branches each in the 36 states of the federation and the headquarters in FCT.

== Library ==
The CBN has a standard library at its headquarters and branch offices. it holds information resources including journals, magazines and books of various fields of study, and is open for students, researchers and staff.

== History ==
=== Authorizing legislation ===
In 1948, an inquiry under the leadership of G.D Paton was established by the colonial administration to investigate banking practices in Nigeria. Prior to the inquiry, the banking industry was largely uncontrolled.

The G.D. Paton report, an offshoot of the inquiry became the cornerstone of the first banking legislation in the country: the banking ordinance of 1952. The ordinance was designed to prevent non-viable banks from mushrooming and to ensure orderly commercial banking. The banking ordinance triggered rapid growth in the industry, and with growth also came disappointment. By 1958, a few banks had failed. To curtail further failures and to prepare for indigenous control, in 1958, a bill for the establishment of the Central Bank of Nigeria was presented to the House of Representatives of Nigeria. The Central Bank of Nigeria Act No. 24, 1958 was published as chapter 30 of the 1958 edition of the Laws of Nigeria and Lagos. It was fully implemented on 1 July 1959, when the Central Bank of Nigeria came into full operation and remained the primary statute governing the CBN until its repeal by the Central Bank of Nigeria Act No.24, 1991. In April 1960, the bank issued its first treasury bills. In May 1961, the bank launched the Lagos Bankers Clearing House, which provided licensed banks a framework in which to exchange and clear checks rapidly. By 1 July 1961, the bank had completed issuing all denominations of new Nigerian notes and coins and redeemed all of the British West African pounds that were circulating in Nigeria.

=== Structure ===
Board of directors

The CBN is governed by a board of directors, responsible for formulating policies and overseeing operations. The board consists of:

Governor: The Chief Executive Officer of the CBN and head of the board.

Deputy governors: Up to four, each responsible for specific directorates.

Non-executive directors: Appointed to provide oversight and guidance.

Key functions:

Approving major policies and decisions.

Supervising the overall administration of the CBN.

Governor

The governor is the head of the CBN, appointed by the president of Nigeria and confirmed by the Senate.

Responsibilities include implementing monetary policy, managing currency, and ensuring financial system stability.

Deputy governors

The CBN has four deputy governors, each assigned to oversee specific areas:

Financial System Stability Directorate

Corporate Services Directorate

Economic Policy Directorate

Operations Directorate

Directorates and departments

The CBN has multiple directorates, each headed by a director. Key directorates include:

Monetary Policy Directorate: Handles monetary policy formulation and implementation.

Banking Supervision Directorate: Regulates and supervises banks and other financial institutions.

Financial Markets Directorate: Oversees foreign exchange management and market operations.

Currency Operations Directorate: Manages currency production, distribution, and circulation.

Development Finance Directorate: Supports economic development by funding sectors like agriculture and SMEs.

Research Department: Conducts research to guide monetary policy and economic development.

Regional offices

The CBN has branches across Nigeria's geopolitical zones to implement policies, monitor financial institutions, and manage currency distribution at the regional level.

Specialized functions

Monetary Policy Committee (MPC): A key committee within the CBN that decides interest rates and other monetary policy measures.

Payment System Management: Oversees the modernization and security of payment systems in Nigeria.

Financial Inclusion Programs: Implements initiatives to expand access to financial services, especially in rural areas.

=== Policy implementation and criticism ===
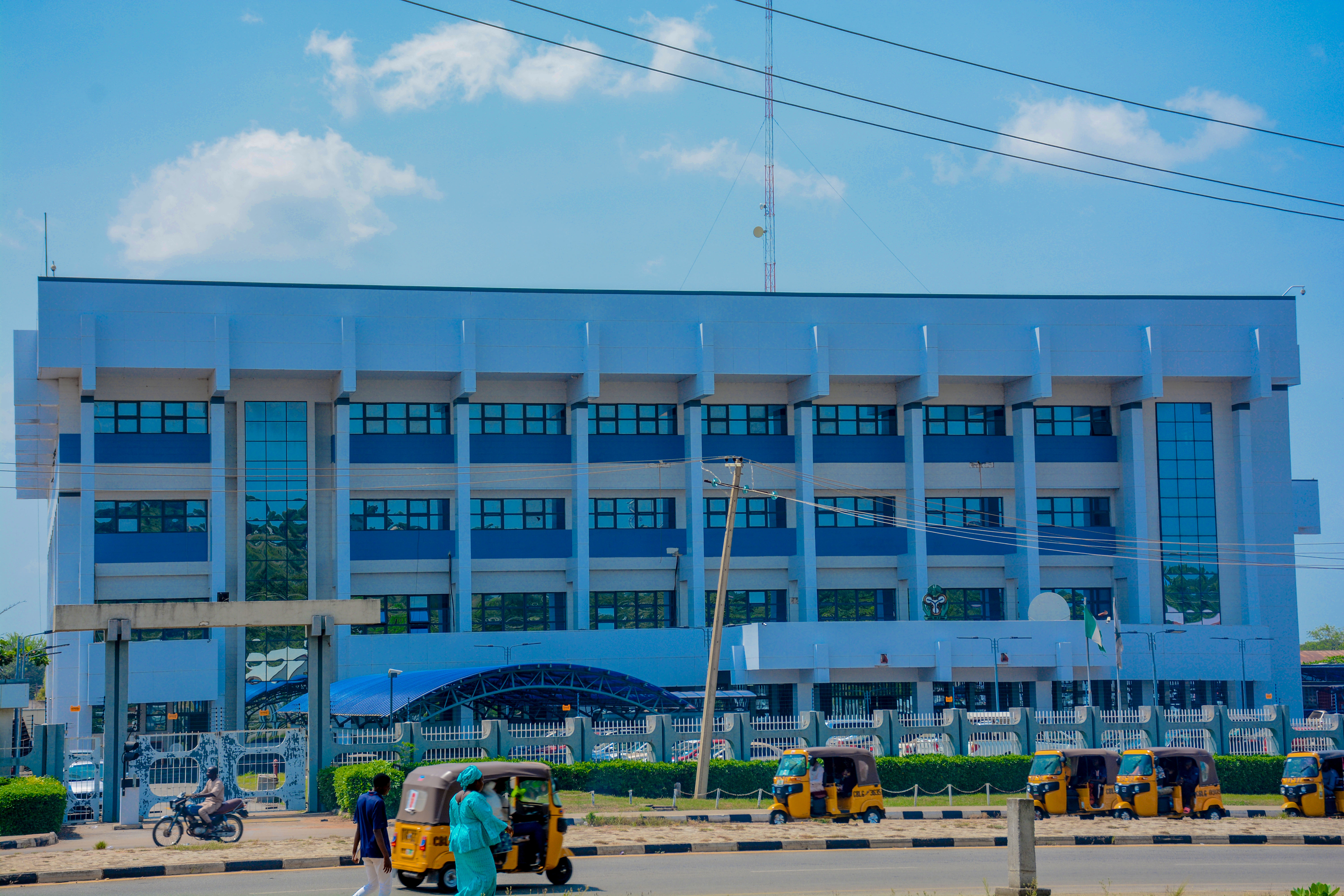
CBN building in Minna, Niger state

The CBN's early functions were mainly to act as the government's agency for the control and supervision of the banking sector, to monitor the balance of payments according to the demands of the federal government and to tailor monetary policy along the demands of the federal budget. A key instrument of the bank was to initiate credit limit legislation for bank lending. The initiative was geared to make credit available to neglected national areas such as agriculture and manufacturing. By the end of 1979, most of the banks did not adhere to their credit limits and favoured a loose interpretation of CBN's guidelines.

The central bank did not effectively curtail the prevalence of short term loan maturities. Most loans given out by commercial banks were usually set within a year. The major policy to balance this distortion in the credit market was to create a new Bank of Commerce and industry, a universal bank. However, the new bank did not fulfill its mission. Another policy of the bank in concert with the intentions of the government was direct involvement in the affairs of the three major expatriate commercial banks in order to forestall any bias against indigenous borrowers and consumers. By 1976, the federal government had acquired 40% of equity in the three largest commercial banks. The bank's slow reaction to curtail inflation by financing huge deficits of the federal government has been one of the sore points in the history of the central bank. Coupled with its failure to control the burgeoning trade arrears in 1983, the country was left with huge trade debts totaling $6 billion.

=== Under Charles Chukwuma Soludo ===
The Central Bank was instrumental in the growth and financial credibility of Nigerian commercial banks by making sure that all the financial banks operating in the country had a capital base (required reserves). This helped to ensure that bank customers just did not bear losses alone, in the event of bank failures. However, this policy led to the failure of some Nigerian commercial banks; some banks could not meet the new capital base requirements, which was ₦25,000,000,000.00 (25 billion Nigerian Naira) at the time. Those banks that could not meet the new capital base requirements had to fold up, while some that could not come up with the money on their own, had to merge with other banks in order to raise the money. This policy helped solidify the commercial banks of Nigeria and made it impossible for individuals or organizations without financial stability to operate a bank in the country. Today Nigeria has one of the most advanced financial sectors in Africa, with most of its commercial banks having branches in other countries.

The Central Bank is active in promoting financial inclusion policy and is a leading member of the Alliance for Financial Inclusion. It is also one of the original 17 regulatory institutions to make specific national commitments to financial inclusion under the Maya Declaration during the 2011 Global Policy Forum held in Mexico. The CBN has ensured that all banks in Nigeria have uniform year-ends. The various commercial banks include Access Bank Plc, Citibank Nigeria Plc, Diamond Bank Plc, First Bank of Nigeria Plc, Guaranty Trust Bank Plc, Zenith Bank plc, Wema Bank, Stanbic IBTC Bank, Fidelity Bank, United Bank for Africa etc.

=== Changes in the 21st century ===
In 2009, the CBN fired the CEOs and executive directors of five Nigerian banks (Afribank, FinBank Nigeria, Intercontinental Bank, Oceanic Bank and Union Bank of Nigeria) for mismanagement of loans and over-reliance on the CBN. In 2014, President Goodluck Jonathan suspended the governor of the CBN Sanusi Lamido Sanusi on grounds of financial recklessness. In April 2021, the Central Bank of Nigeria fired the whole board of the First Bank of Nigeria which was in a "grave financial condition".

In July 2021, CBN announced that it had ended the sales of foreign exchange (forex) to bureau de change operators. Following the announcement, all forex sales were to go directly to commercial banks. That same month the bank's governor, Godwin Emefiele, said that Nigeria would launch its own cryptocurrency, called "e-naira," in October, which is not a cryptocurrency per se but effectively build on the blockchain technology and available through the mobile applications eNaira Speed Wallet and eNaira Speed Merchant Wallet. At its launching by President Muhammadu Buhari on 25 October, the platform was joined by 33 banks and ₦500m worth of eNaira was minted. The introduction of the eNaira came a few months after the government had banned all cryptocurrencies.

In January 2023, the Central Bank of Nigeria (CBN), in partnership with the Nigeria Inter-Bank Settlement Systems (NIBSS), launched AfriGo, Nigeria's first National Payment card scheme. The card was unveiled in Abuja by the then CBN Governor, Godwin Emefiele. The initiative was designed to accelerate Nigeria's financial inclusion strategy and provide a lower-cost domestic payment alternative that could compete with international networks such as Mastercard and Visa.

In June 2023, the governor of CBN, Godwin Emefilele was arrested by the Nigerian State Security Service and removed from his position at the CBN following a previous arrest attempt in December 2022 for "financing terrorism, fraudulent activities, and economic crimes of national security dimension." This was after claims that Emefiele was waging a war on cash under a directive from the International Monetary Fund and the World Economic Forum.

On 14 June 2023, the Naira fell 23% in a day, to a rate of ₦600 to US$1, as the central bank abandoned its currency peg and allowed the naira to trade freely.

In February 2025, the Central Bank of Nigeria approved for the first time the inclusion of the CFA franc on Nigeria's export receipt forms, allowing its use by Nigerian banks for the repatriation of export receipts, this approval is expected to facilitate cross-border transactions with countries that primarily use the CFA franc.

== Leadership ==
The Senate of the Federal Republic of Nigeria confirmed the nomination of Dr Olayemi Cardoso as the 12th Governor of the Central Bank of Nigeria on 26 September 2023.

== Statutory duties and powers ==
The Central Bank of Nigeria (Establishment) Act 2007 affirms the establishment of a body known as the Central Bank of Nigeria. The act also states the fundamental objects of the bank, which include the sole power to issue notes and coins, maintain an external reserve for Nigeria, and generally supervise the entire banking system in Nigeria.

The Banks and Other Financial Institutions Act, 2020, empowers the governor of the CBN to issue a license to anyone wanting to start a banking business in Nigeria, with specific procedures. The act prohibits anyone from operating a banking business in Nigeria without such a license. Additionally, the BOFIA empowers the governor of the CBN to issue regulations, guidelines and policies to banks, specialized banks, and other financial institutions in Nigeria. And to appoint officers to supervise and examine these institutions according to the dictates of the governor. Also, Section 5 of the BOFIA empowers the CBN to revoke the license of any bank for stipulated reasons.

== See also ==
- Nigerian pound
- Nigerian naira
- Payment system
- Real-time gross settlement
- Bank Verification Number
- Treasury single account
- Cashless Policy (Nigeria)
- Banking in Nigeria
- Zero COT
- List of central banks of Africa
- List of financial supervisory authorities by country
- List of central banks
