= Second cabinet of President Muhammadu Buhari =

Nigerian presidential cabinet from 2019 to 2023

Second Cabinet of President Muhammadu Buhari
- Cabinet of Nigeria
- Date formed: 21 August 2019
- Date dissolved: 29 May 2023

People and organisations
- Head of state: Muhammadu Buhari
- Head of government: Muhammadu Buhari
- Member party: All Progressives Congress
- Opposition party: People's Democratic Party

History
- Predecessor: First Cabinet of Muhammadu Buhari
- Successor: Cabinet of Bola Tinubu

The second cabinet of President Muhammadu Buhari consists of the ministers appointed in the Buhari administration to take responsibility for each of the government ministries of Nigeria following the 2019 elections. Most ministers were sworn in on 21 August 2019 and the cabinet was dissolved on 29 May 2023, the day of Bola Tinubu's inauguration.

== Formation ==
Similarly to his first cabinet formation, Buhari delayed appointing a cabinet until later in the year, much to the chagrin of pundits and economists who said that the delay was hurting policy development and economic growth.

On 11 November, a cabinet of 43 ministers from each of the 36 states of Nigeria was sworn in. (Note: By convention, the cabinet contains a minister or minister of state from each of the 36 states.) The list did not contain over a dozen ministers that were in Buhari's first cabinet while including numerous former governors. The new cabinet was criticized for its decline in gender diversity (with only seven women compared to fifteen at the start of the last cabinet) and preference for political allies over technocrats.

== Cabinet of Nigeria ==
Portfolio	Minister	Took office	Left office	Party
The Presidency
President	Muhammadu Buhari (Note: Serves as President and Minister of Petroleum Resources concurrently.)	29 May 2019	29 May 2023	APC
Vice President	Yemi Osinbajo	29 May 2019	29 May 2023	APC
Chief of Staff to the President	Abba Kyari	5 June 2019	17 April 2020 (Note: Died from COVID-19 complications.)	APC
Chief of Staff to the President	Ibrahim Gambari	13 May 2020	29 May 2023	APC
Secretary to the Government of the Federation	Boss Mustapha	5 June 2019	29 May 2023	APC
Ministry of Agriculture and Rural Development
Minister of Agriculture and Rural Development	Sabo Nanono	21 August 2019	1 September 2021 (Note: Sacked after a cabinet "self-review" to "strengthen weak areas.")	APC
Minister of Agriculture and Rural Development	Mohammad Mahmood Abubakar	1 September 2021	29 May 2023	APC
Minister of State for Agriculture and Rural Development	Mustapha Baba Shehuri	21 August 2019	29 May 2023	APC
Ministry of Aviation
Minister of Aviation	Hadi Sirika	21 August 2019	29 May 2023	APC
Ministry of Communications and Digital Economy
Minister of Communications and Digital Economy	Isa Ali Pantami	21 August 2019	29 May 2023	APC
Ministry of Defence
Minister of Defence	Bashir Salihi Magashi	21 August 2019	29 May 2023	APC
Ministry of Education
Minister of Education	Adamu Adamu	21 August 2019	29 May 2023	APC
Minister of State for Education	Chukwuemeka Nwajiuba	21 August 2019	11 May 2022 (Note: Although Nwajiuba tendered his resignation on 28 April, he continued serving as minister until 11 May.) (Note: Resigned to run for President in line with a Buhari directive for ministers seeking office to resign by 16 May 2022.)	APC
Minister of State for Education	Goodluck Nanah Opiah	6 July 2022	29 May 2023	APC
Ministry of Environment
Minister of Environment	Mohammad Mahmood Abubakar	21 August 2019	10 September 2021 (Note: Resigned to become Minister of Agriculture and Rural Development; ministry handed over to Minister of State until new Minister was appointed.)	APC
Minister of Environment	Mohammed Hassan Abdullahi	6 April 2022	29 May 2023	APC
Minister of State for Environment	Sharon Ikeazor	21 August 2019	6 July 2022 (Note: Redeployed as Minister of State for Niger Delta Affairs in the July 2022 cabinet reshuffle.)	APC
Minister of State for Environment	Odum Udi	6 July 2022	29 May 2023	APC
Federal Capital Territory Administration
Minister of the Federal Capital Territory	Mohammed Musa Bello	21 August 2019	29 May 2023	PDP
Minister of State for the Federal Capital Territory	Ramatu Tijani Aliyu	21 August 2019	29 May 2023	APC
Ministry of Finance, Budget and National Planning
Minister of Finance, Budget and National Planning	Zainab Ahmed	21 August 2019	29 May 2023	N/A
Minister of State for Budget and National Planning	Clement Agba	21 August 2019	29 May 2023	N/A
Ministry of Foreign Affairs
Minister of Foreign Affairs	Geoffrey Onyeama	21 August 2019	29 May 2023	APC
Minister of State for Foreign Affairs	Zubairu Dada	21 August 2019	29 May 2023	N/A
Ministry of Health
Minister of Health	Osagie Ehanire	21 August 2019	29 May 2023	APC
Minister of State for Health	Adeleke Mamora	21 August 2019	6 July 2022 (Note: Redeployed as Minister of Science and Technology in the July 2022 cabinet reshuffle.)	APC
Minister of State for Health	Ekumankama Joseph Nkama	6 July 2022	29 May 2023	APC
Ministry of Humanitarian Affairs, Disaster Management and Social Development
Minister of Humanitarian Affairs, Disaster Management and Social Development	Sadiya Umar Farouq	21 August 2019	29 May 2023	APC
Ministry of Industry, Trade and Investment
Minister of Industry, Trade and Investment	Niyi Adebayo	21 August 2019	29 May 2023	APC
Minister of State for Industry, Trade and Investment	Mariam Yalwaji Katagum	21 August 2019	29 May 2023	N/A
Ministry of Information and Culture
Minister of Information and Culture	Lai Mohammed	21 August 2019	29 May 2023	APC
Ministry of the Interior
Minister of the Interior	Rauf Aregbesola	21 August 2019	29 May 2023	APC
Ministry of Justice
Minister of Justice and Attorney General of the Federation	Abubakar Malami	21 August 2019	29 May 2023	APC
Ministry of Labour and Employment
Minister of Labour and Employment	Chris Ngige	21 August 2019	29 May 2023	APC
Minister of State for Labour and Employment	Tayo Alasoadura	21 August 2019	24 September 2019 (Note: Redeployed as Minister of State for Niger Delta Affairs.)	APC
Minister of State for Labour and Employment	Festus Keyamo	24 September 2019	29 May 2023	APC
Ministry of Mines and Steel Development
Minister of Mines and Steel Development	Olamilekan Adegbite	21 August 2019	29 May 2023	APC
Minister of State for Mines and Steel Development	Uchechukwu Sampson Ogah	21 August 2019	May 2022	APC
Minister of State for Mines and Steel Development	Gbemisola Ruqayyah Saraki	6 July 2022	29 May 2023	APC
Ministry of Niger Delta Affairs
Minister of Niger Delta Affairs	Godswill Akpabio	21 August 2019	11 May 2022	APC
Minister of Niger Delta Affairs	Umana Okon Umana	6 July 2022	29 May 2023	APC
Minister of State for Niger Delta Affairs	Festus Keyamo	21 August 2019	24 September 2019 (Note: Redeployed as Minister of State for Labour and Employment.)	APC
Minister of State for Niger Delta Affairs	Tayo Alasoadura	24 September 2019	May 2022	APC
Minister of State for Niger Delta Affairs	Sharon Ikeazor	6 July 2022	29 May 2023	APC
Ministry of Petroleum Resources
Minister of Petroleum Resources	Muhammadu Buhari	21 August 2019	29 May 2023	APC
Minister of State for Petroleum Resources	Timipre Sylva	21 August 2019	29 May 2023	APC
Ministry of Police Affairs
Minister of Police Affairs	Mohammed Maigari Dingyadi	21 August 2019	29 May 2023	APC
Ministry of Power
Minister of Power	Saleh Mamman	21 August 2019	1 September 2021	APC
Minister of Power	Abubakar Aliyu	1 September 2021	29 May 2023	APC
Minister of State for Power	Goddy Jedy Agba	21 August 2019	29 May 2023	APC
Ministry of Science, Technology and Innovation (Note: Originally Ministry of Science and Technology until 6 August 2021.)
Minister of Science, Technology and Innovation	Ogbonnaya Onu	21 August 2019	11 May 2022	APC
Minister of Science, Technology and Innovation	Adeleke Mamora	6 July 2022	29 May 2023	APC
Minister of State for Science, Technology and Innovation	Mohammed Hassan Abdullahi	21 August 2019	6 April 2022 (Note: Resigned to become Minister of Environment.)	APC
Minister of State for Science, Technology and Innovation	Henry Ikechukwu Ikoh	6 July 2022	29 May 2023	APC
Ministry of Special Duties and Inter-governmental Affairs
Minister of Special Duties and Inter-governmental Affairs	George Akume	21 August 2019	29 May 2023	APC
Ministry of Transportation
Minister of Transportation	Rotimi Amaechi	21 August 2019	16 May 2022	APC
Minister of Transportation	Mu'azu Sambo	6 July 2022	29 May 2023	APC
Minister of State for Transportation	Gbemisola Ruqayyah Saraki	21 August 2019	6 July 2022 (Note: Redeployed as Minister of State for Mines and Steel Development in the July 2022 cabinet reshuffle.)	APC
Minister of State for Transportation	Ademola Adewole Adegoroye	6 July 2022	29 May 2023	APC
Ministry of Water Resources
Minister of Water Resources	Suleiman Adamu Kazaure	21 August 2019	29 May 2023	APC
Ministry of Women Affairs
Minister of Women Affairs and Social Development	Pauline Tallen	21 August 2019	29 May 2023	APC
Ministry of Works and Housing
Minister of Works and Housing	Babatunde Fashola	21 August 2019	29 May 2023	APC
Minister of State for Works and Housing	Abubakar Aliyu	21 August 2019	1 September 2021 (Note: Resigned to become Minister of Power)	APC
Minister of State for Works and Housing	Mu'azu Sambo	24 December 2021	6 July 2022 (Note: Redeployed as Minister of Transportation in the July 2022 cabinet reshuffle.)	APC
Minister of State for Works and Housing	Umar Ibrahim El-Yakub	6 July 2022	29 May 2023	APC
Ministry of Youth and Sports Development
Minister of Youth and Sports Development	Sunday Dare	21 August 2019	29 May 2023	APC

== See also ==
- Cabinet of Nigeria
- Federal government of Nigeria
