= First cabinet of President Muhammadu Buhari =

Presidential cabinet of Nigeria from 2015 to 2019

Cabinet of President Muhammadu Buhari
- Cabinet of Nigeria
- Date formed: September 2015–November 2015
- Date dissolved: 28 May 2019

People and organisations
- Head of state: Muhammadu Buhari
- Head of government: Muhammadu Buhari
- Member party: All Progressives Congress
- Opposition party: People's Democratic Party

History
- Predecessor: Cabinet of President Goodluck Jonathan
- Successor: Second Cabinet of President Muhammadu Buhari

The first cabinet of President Muhammadu Buhari consists of the ministers appointed in the Buhari administration to take responsibility for each of the government ministries of Nigeria following the 2015 elections. Most ministers were sworn in on 11 November 2015 and the cabinet was dissolved on 28 May 2019, the day before Buhari's second inauguration.

== Formation ==
In an interview published by Vanguard on 19 April 2015, Buhari, whose administration was to begin on 29 May 2015, said he would assemble a small cabinet that might be active before the official ceremony. On 31 May 2015 Buhari was reported to have said he would break with the People's Democratic Party (PDP) tradition where ministers were nominated by governors. (Note: By convention, the cabinet contains a minister or minister of state from each of the 36 states.) He would look for people who were competent, dedicated and experienced. On 1 July 2015 a spokesman for the president said that Buhari would delay selecting a cabinet until September. He wanted to eliminate prior corruption before the new ministers were appointed. Another spokesman said that the delay was "nothing out of the ordinary" compared to the formation of previous cabinets. However, a London-based economist said the delay would not be well received by investors.

On the night of 30 September, TheCable, an online newspaper in Nigeria, reported a list of 21 names submitted to Senate President Bukola Saraki for screening and confirmation. On 11 November, a cabinet of 36 ministers from each of the 36 states of Nigeria was sworn in.

== Cabinet of Nigeria ==
Portfolio	Minister	Took office	Left office	Party
The Presidency
President	Muhammadu Buhari (Note: Served as President and Minister of Petroleum Resources concurrently.)	29 May 2015	29 May 2019	APC
Vice President	Yemi Osinbajo	29 May 2015	29 May 2019	APC
Chief of Staff to the President	Abba Kyari	27 August 2015	29 May 2019	APC
Secretary to the Government of the Federation	Babachir David Lawal	27 August 2015	30 October 2017 (Note: Sacked due to the findings of an investigation into corruption allegations.) (suspended 19 April 2017) (Note: Suspended due to an investigation into corruption allegations.)	APC
Secretary to the Government of the Federation	Habibat Lawal (acting)	19 April 2017	1 November 2017	N/A
Secretary to the Government of the Federation	Boss Mustapha	1 November 2017	28 May 2019	APC
Ministry of Agriculture and Rural Development
Minister of Agriculture and Rural Development	Audu Innocent Ogbeh	11 November 2015	28 May 2019	APC
Minister of State for Agriculture and Rural Development	Heineken Lokpobiri	11 November 2015	28 May 2019	APC
Ministry of Budget and National Planning
Minister of Budget and National Planning	Udoma Udo Udoma	11 November 2015	28 May 2019	N/A
Minister of State for Budget and National Planning	Zainab Ahmed	11 November 2015	19 September 2018 (Note: Resigned after becoming Minister of Finance.)	N/A
Ministry of Communications
Minister of Communications	Abdur-Raheem Adebayo Shittu	11 November 2015	28 May 2019	APC
Ministry of Defence
Minister of Defence	Mansur Dan Ali	11 November 2015	28 May 2019	APC
Ministry of Education
Minister of Education	Adamu Adamu	11 November 2015	28 May 2019	APC
Minister of State for Education	Anthony Anwuka	11 November 2015	28 May 2019	N/A
Ministry of Environment
Minister of Environment	Amina Mohammed	11 November 2015	15 December 2016 (Note: Resigned to become Deputy Secretary-General of the United Nations.)	N/A
Minister of Environment	Ibrahim Usman Jibril (Note: Served as Minister and Minister of State concurrently from 15 December 2016.)	15 December 2016	12 December 2018 (Note: Resigned to become Emir of the Nasarawa Emirate.)	APC
Minister of Environment	Suleiman Hassan Zarma	13 December 2018	28 May 2019	APC
Minister of State for Environment	Ibrahim Usman Jibril	11 November 2015	12 December 2018	APC
Federal Capital Territory Administration
Minister of the Federal Capital Territory	Mohammed Musa Bello	11 November 2015	28 May 2019	APC
Ministry of Finance
Minister of Finance	Kemi Adeosun (Note: Not a member of any political party until 5 May 2018.)	11 November 2015	14 September 2018 (Note: Resigned in the midst of journalists reporting that she had illegally obtained her NYSC exemption certificate to enter public office.)	APC
Minister of Finance	Zainab Ahmed	14 September 2018	28 May 2019	N/A
Ministry of Foreign Affairs
Minister of Foreign Affairs	Geoffrey Onyeama	11 November 2015	28 May 2019	APC
Minister of State for Foreign Affairs	Khadija Bukar Abba Ibrahim	11 November 2015	9 January 2019 (Note: Resigned to successfully run for the House of Representatives in the Damaturu/Gujba/Gulani/Tarmuwa Federal Constituency.)	APC
Ministry of Health
Minister of Health	Isaac Folorunso Adewole	11 November 2015	28 May 2019	N/A
Minister of State for Health	Osagie Ehanire	11 November 2015	28 May 2019	APC
Ministry of Industry, Trade and Investment
Minister of Industry, Trade and Investment	Okechukwu Enelamah	11 November 2015	28 May 2019	N/A
Minister of State for Industry, Trade and Investment	Aisha Abubakar	11 November 2015	30 September 2018 (Note: Resigned after becoming Minister of Women Affairs and Social Development.)	N/A
Ministry of Information and Culture
Minister of Information and Culture	Lai Mohammed	11 November 2015	28 May 2019	APC
Ministry of the Interior
Minister of the Interior	Abdulrahman Bello Dambazau	11 November 2015	28 May 2019	APC
Ministry of Justice
Minister of Justice and Attorney General of the Federation	Abubakar Malami	11 November 2015	28 May 2019	APC
Ministry of Labour and Employment
Minister of Labour and Employment	Chris Ngige	11 November 2015	28 May 2019	APC
Minister of State for Labour and Employment	James Ocholi	11 November 2015	6 March 2016 (Note: Died in a car crash.)	APC
Minister of State for Labour and Employment	Stephen Ocheni	16 August 2017	28 May 2019	APC
Ministry of Mines and Steel Development
Minister of Mines and Steel Development	Kayode Fayemi	11 November 2015	30 May 2018 (Note: Resigned to successfully run for Governor of Ekiti State.)	APC
Minister of Mines and Steel Development	Abubakar Bawa Bwari (Note: Served as Minister and Minister of State concurrently from 30 May 2018.)	30 May 2018	28 May 2019	APC
Minister of State for Mines and Steel Development	Abubakar Bawa Bwari	11 November 2015	28 May 2019	APC
Ministry of Niger Delta Affairs
Minister of Niger Delta Affairs	Usani Uguru Usani	11 November 2015	28 May 2019	APC
Minister of State for Niger Delta Affairs	Omole Daramola	11 November 2015	28 May 2019	N/A
Ministry of Petroleum Resources
Minister of Petroleum Resources	Muhammadu Buhari	11 November 2015	28 May 2019	APC
Minister of State for Petroleum Resources	Emmanuel Ibe Kachikwu	11 November 2015	28 May 2019	APC
Ministry of Power, Works and Housing
Minister of Power, Works and Housing	Babatunde Fashola	11 November 2015	28 May 2019	APC
Minister(s) of State for Power, Works and Housing	Mustapha Baba Shehuri	11 November 2015	28 May 2019	APC
Minister(s) of State for Power, Works and Housing	Suleiman Hassan Zarma	16 August 2017	13 December 2018	APC
Ministry of Science and Technology
Minister of Science and Technology	Ogbonnaya Onu	11 November 2015	28 May 2019	APC
Ministry of Transportation
Minister of Transportation	Rotimi Amaechi	11 November 2015	28 May 2019	APC
Minister of State for Aviation	Hadi Sirika	11 November 2015	28 May 2019	APC
Ministry of Water Resources
Minister of Water Resources	Suleiman Adamu Kazaure	11 November 2015	28 May 2019	APC
Ministry of Women Affairs and Social Development
Minister of Women Affairs and Social Development	Aisha Alhassan	11 November 2015	29 September 2018 (Note: Resigned after the APC disqualified her candidacy for Governor of Taraba State.)	APC
Minister of Women Affairs and Social Development	Aisha Abubakar	30 September 2018	28 May 2019	N/A
Ministry of Youth and Sports Development (Note: Originally Ministry of Youth Development until 11 November 2016.)
Minister of Youth and Sports Development	Solomon Dalung	11 November 2015	28 May 2019	APC

== See also ==
- Cabinet of Nigeria
- Federal government of Nigeria
