= Water supply and sanitation in Nigeria =

- The flag of Nigeria

Data
- Water coverage (broad definition): 69% (2015)
- Sanitation coverage (broad definition): 33% (2015)
- Continuity of supply: not available
- Average urban water use (L/person/day): not available
- Average urban water and sanitation tariff (US$/m^{3}): Flat residential fee of USD 3 per month in Lagos and USD 11 per month in Kaduna (2007)
- Share of household metering: 21% in Lagos, 16% in Kaduna (2007)
- Annual investment in WSS: Naira 82.5 billion (USD 0.5 billion) in 2010, corresponding to US$3/capita/year
- Share of external financing: Mainly by external donors

Institutions
- Decentralization to municipalities: No decentralization to the municipal level
- National water and sanitation company: No
- Water and sanitation regulator: No
- Responsibility for policy setting: Federal Ministry of Water Resources and State Ministries of Water Resources and 36 State Water Agencies (water supply), unclear (sanitation)
- Sector law: No
- No. of urban service providers: 36 State Water Agencies
- No. of rural service providers: Water and Sanitation Committees (number not available)

Responsibility of water supply in Nigeria is shared between three (3) levels of government – federal, state and local. The federal government is in charge of water resources management; state governments have the primary responsibility for urban water supply; and local governments together with communities are responsible for rural water supply. The responsibility for sanitation is not clearly defined.

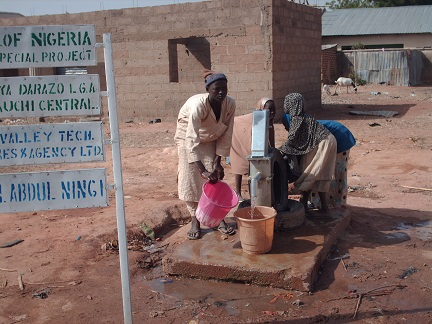
Ningi built borehole

Water supply service quality and cost recovery are low. Water tariffs are low and many water users do not pay their bills. Service providers thus rely mostly on occasional subsidies to cover their operating costs.

National policies and Initiatives encourages the participation of private sector and reform of policy at the State level. The national water supply and sanitation recognizes the importance of water supply and sanitation as it is central to healthy society and national development.

In interviews, Kemi Badenoch, who became leader of the Conservative Party in November 2024, has shared that during her childhood in Nigeria, her family struggled with unreliable water and electricity supplies. This experience influenced her political views, especially her opposition to socialism and is part of the reason she values infrastructure stability and free markets, having witnessed firsthand the challenges of living without consistent access to basic utilities.

== Access ==
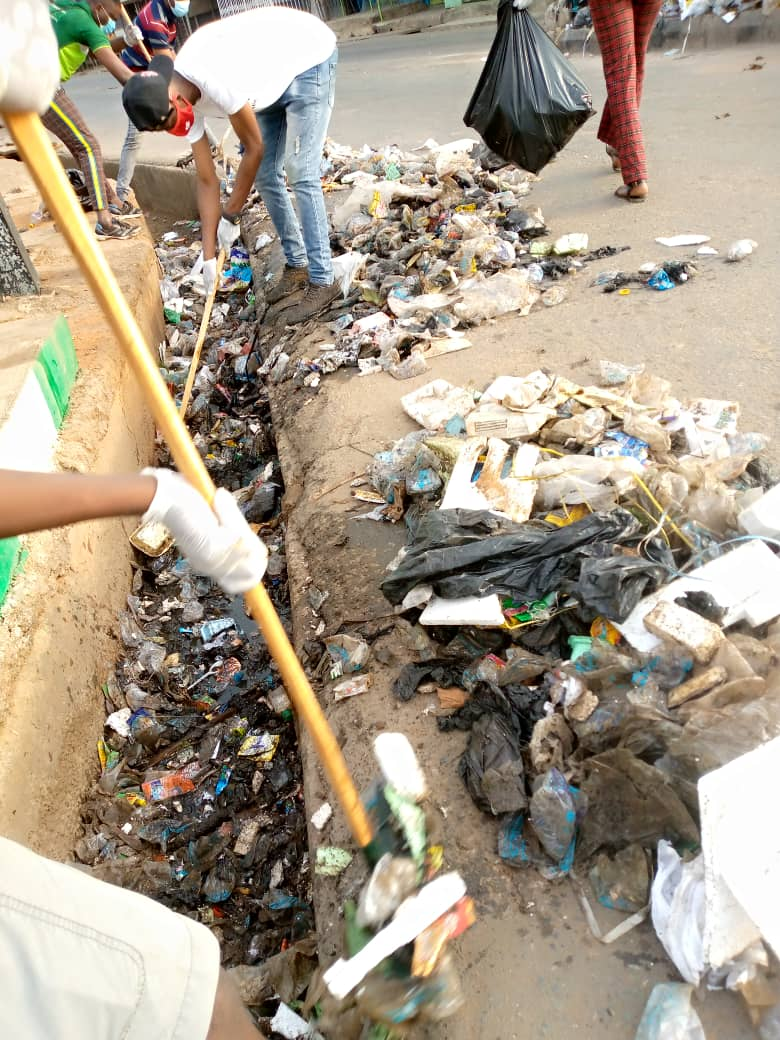
Volunteers clearing gutters in Ilorin, Nigeria during a volunteer sanitation day. Even when there is adequate infrastructure for sanitation maintenance and efficacy may not always be available in Nigeria. Plastic pollution interferes with sewage supply the world over.

As of 2015, 67% of the total population of Nigeria had access to at least basic water supplies. This was 82% of the urban population and 54% of the rural population. Most people in Nigeria do not have access to clean water, especially in the rural areas. The global water sanitation and hygiene statistics shows that 79 per cent of Nigerians go through the challenge of water scarcity. In 2015, about 60 million people lacked access to "at least basic" water. As for sanitation, only 33% of the total population had access to "at least basic" sanitation. This was 39% of the urban population and 27% of the rural population. Approximately 122 million people still lacked access to "at least basic" sanitation.

In the urban areas, access to standpipes substituted to a large extent to piped water access.

Adequate sanitation is typically in the form of septic tanks, as there is no central sewage system.

The statistics on access to water and sanitation are conflicting due to divergent definitions, indicators and methodologies applied by different agencies. There is hardly any sector monitoring.

According to Guardian News: "The Head of Advocacy, Policy and Communication, Water Aid Nigeria, Kolawole Banwo, said out of the 774 Local Government Areas in Nigeria, only 76 are free of the status of open defecation in the country, this sanitation crisis remains a critical issue that needs urgent action".

According to a report published by Amnesty International in September, the oil company Shell and government of Rivers State, in southern Nigeria are not doing enough to provide clean water in Ogale, an area outside of the state capital. Residents are either forced to buy water at un-affordable prices or drink from wells that are contaminated with benzene.

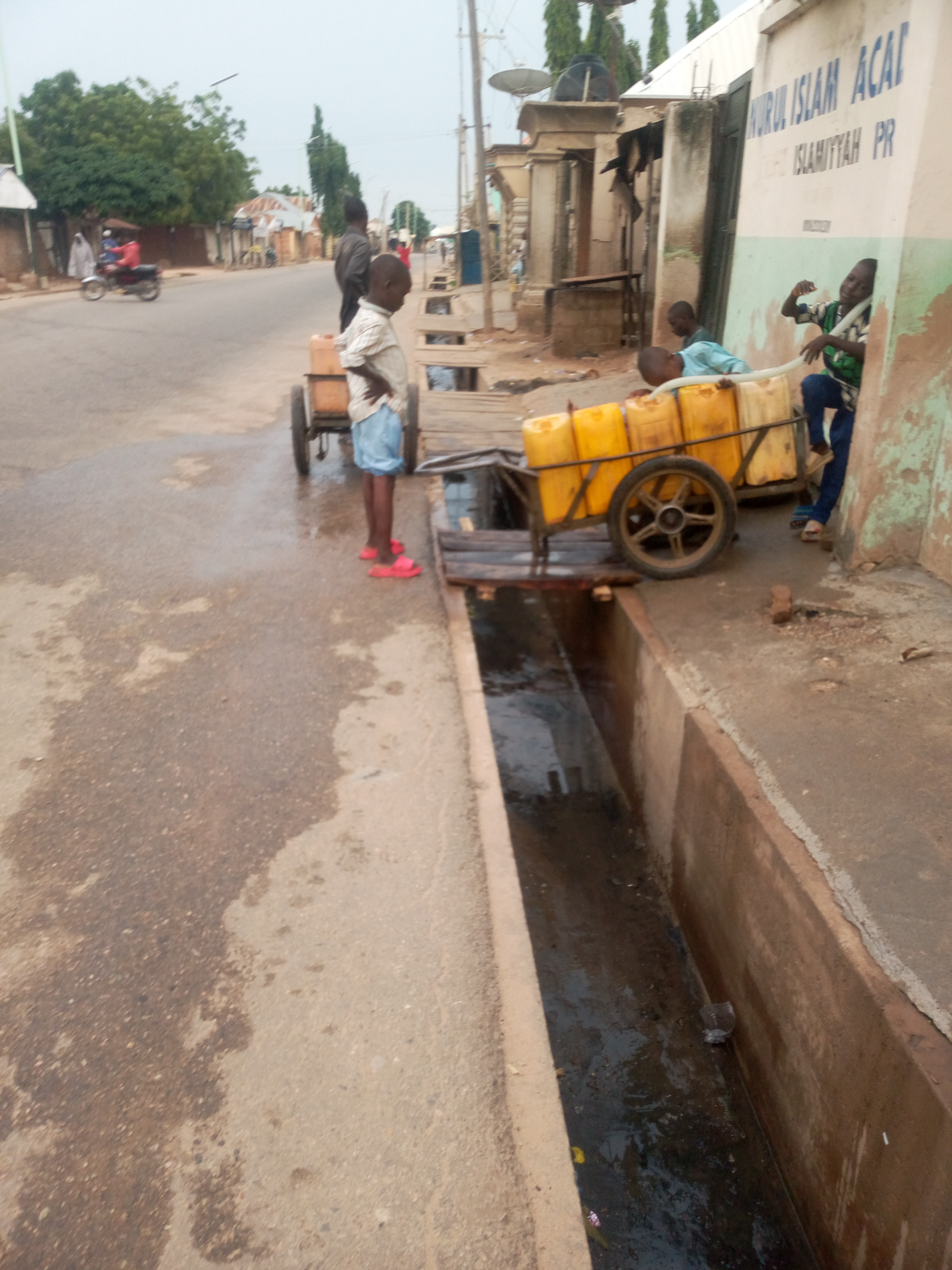
Water services

Water Facility

== Service quality ==
According to the World Bank, in 2010, "water production facilities in Nigeria were rarely not operating to optimum capacity due to broken down equipment, or lack of power supply or fuel for pumping." The operating cost of water agencies is increased by the need to rely on diesel generators or even having to build their own power plants, since power supply is erratic. Equipment and pipes are poorly maintained, leading to intermittent supply and high levels of non-revenue water.

As of 2000, about 80% of all government-owned (public operated) water systems in small towns were non-operational. Through investments and capacity building for communities, the functionality of water points can be increased in the short term. For example, in focus communities supported by UNICEF in Kwara State, functionality has improved from 53% to 98%, and in Kebbi state, the functionality of boreholes have improved from 12% to 88%. However, it is not clear how well these facilities will continue to function in the long term, after international intervention has ended.

In the second decade of the 2000s, it was measured with the presence of metalloids in the water supply designated both to the human and the agricultural use, in some cases with value exceeding the international WHO limits (e.g. in the areas surrounding Zaria, Abakaliki, Ibadan and Onitsha). Polluting of metalloids and particularly of arsenic- varies in a relevant measure during the dry and wet season, due to the mineralization of well and borehole waters and partially to the mining industry activities. The same seasonality of arsenic's tenor has been observed in muscle tissues of demersal fish species. Therefore, the problem of contamination is not completely solved not even for the Nigerian fishing industry and further studies (or regulations) are needed.

== Efficiency ==
Water supply and sanitation are not provided efficiently in Nigeria. For example, state water agencies are massively overstaffed. In 2000, there were about 70 staff per 1,000 customers in state water agencies, compared to a best practice ratio of 3.5. Non-revenue water often exceeds 50 percent.

== Water supply by state ==
=== Abuja ===
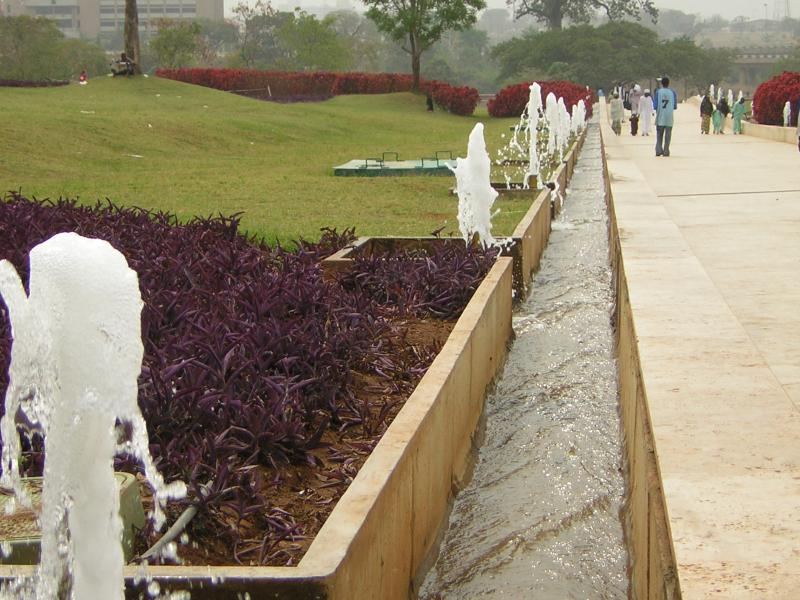
Millennium Park in Abuja, whose water supply is being expanded

Nigeria's capital, Abuja, receives part of its drinking water from the Lower Usuma Dam reservoir. In September 2013, the Federal Capital Territory Water Board (FCTWB) which is the agency that is responsible in providing potable water in the Federal Capital Territory commissioned phase 3 and 4 of the Lower Usman Dam Treatment Plant(LUDWTP) project which began in November 2011. All phases of the project (phase 1, 2, 3, and 4) and the Gurara Dam Reservoir source for raw water from the Lower Usuma Dam reservoir which when combined, has the ability to process 720 million litres of clean water per day to Abuja and her neighbours.

Wastewater is treated at Federal Capital Territory Sewage Treatment Plant located in the Wupa district of Abuja, was constructed by SCC Nigeria Limited and commissioned by President Olusegun Obasanjo.

=== Enugu ===
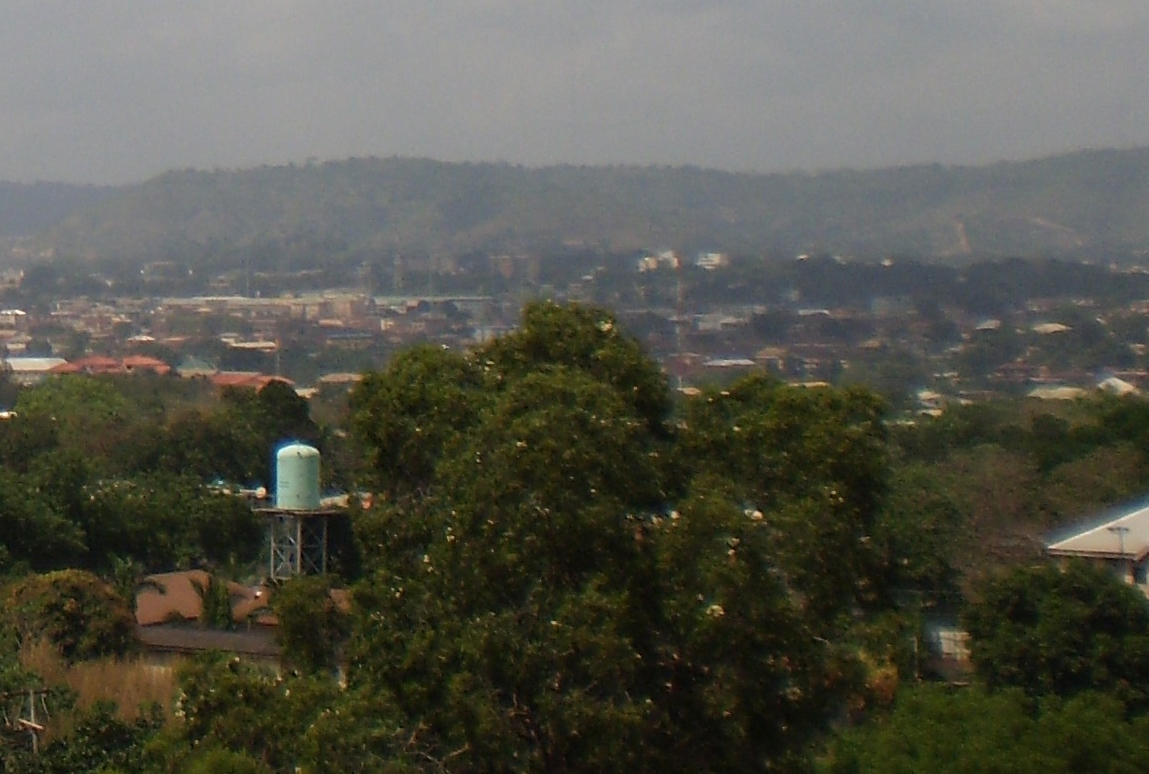
Overview of Enugu city

Enugu is a state in the South-East geopolitical zone of Nigeria. The Enugu State Water Corporation is the agency in charge of water supply in Enugu State, headed by the managing director. Inadequate water supply has been one of the major challenges of the government of Enugu which could be attributed to mis-managed infrastructures and erosion at the Ajali Water Works which supplies 77,000 m^{3} (101,000 yd^{3}) of water daily. The Enugu State House of Assembly in July 2021 passed a bill tagged "the right access to basic water and sanitation services". This bill was moved in a bid to improve water supply and sanitation services in the state.

The Enugu State government began the rehabilitation of the 9th Mile Crash Programme in November 2021 after the project was abandoned for over 30 years. This project was carried out by FordMarx Nigeria Limited.

=== Lagos ===
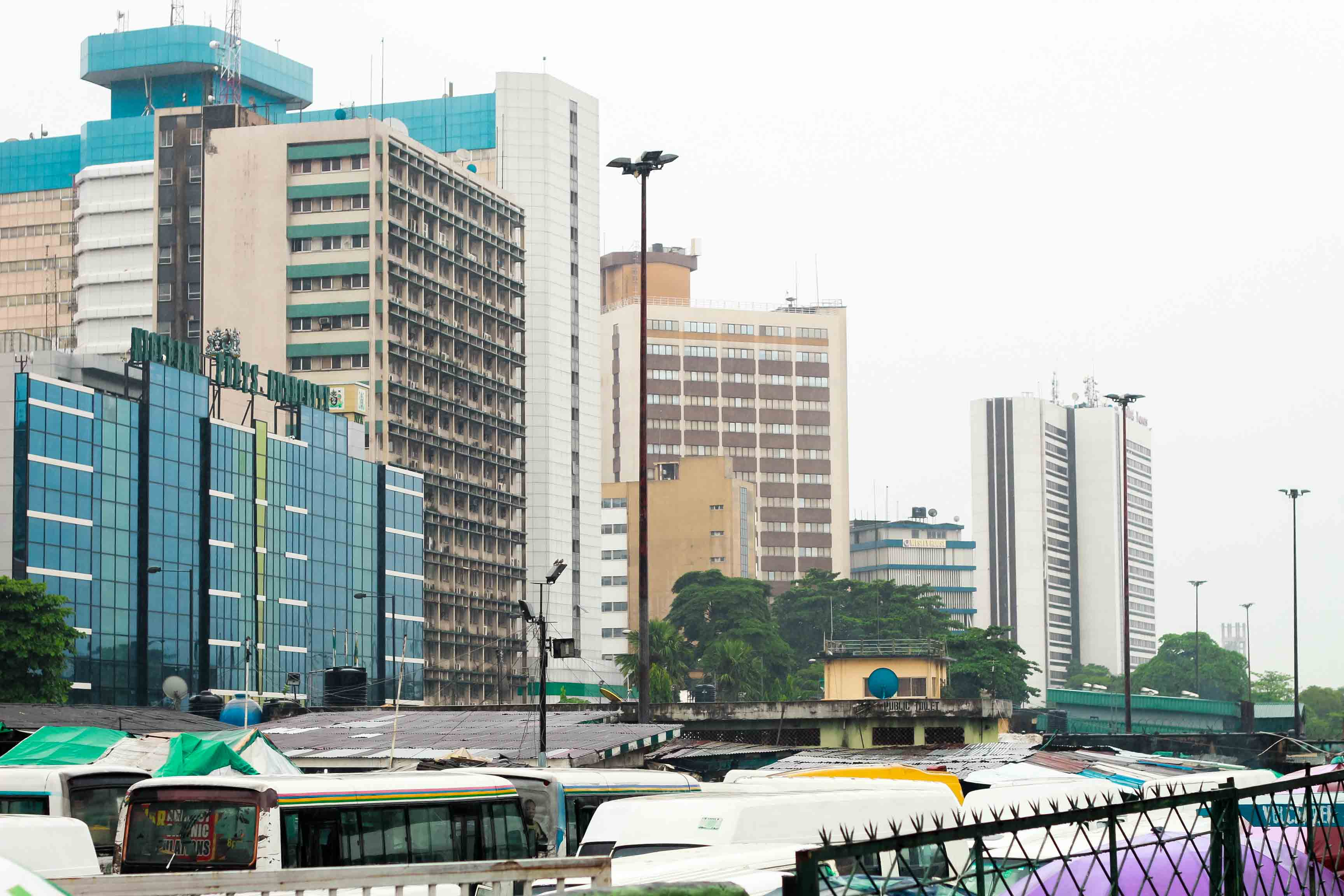
Cms Lagos

Nigeria's largest city by population, Lagos is surrounded by water from the sea and a lagoon. The total estimated percentage of clean water supply in the city is about 81.32%. However, since the raw water in the lagoon is too polluted, the city gets its water from the Ogun and Owo rivers. The city's oldest water treatment plant, located in Iju on the Ogun River, was built in 1910. It was expanded in stages to 45m gallons per day. Another smaller plant was built at Ishashi on the Owo River in the 1970s.

The biggest plant so far was commissioned in 1991 in Adiyan with a capacity of 70m gallons per day. It also draws from the Owo River. There are also seven mini-waterworks drawing from local sources with a combined capacity of 18m gallons per day. The Lagos Water Corporation states that the water produced in the plant meets the highest standards, and that it supplies "safe drinking water in sufficient and regular quantity to over 12.5 million people in Lagos State".

LASWARCO (Lagos Water Corporation) also embarked on a study tour of the National water supply and sanitation council in Zambia in order to resolve the basic factors responsible for water supply and sanitation crisis and required ways in solving the problem. However, water is often contaminated in the distribution network and people distrust tap water quality. Electricity supply interruptions prevent treatment plants from operating continuously. However, a dedicated 12.15 MW power plant was under construction in 2012 to supply power to the Adiyan, Iju and Akute water treatment plants.

Households also source water from numerous private shallow wells. Or households rely on street vendors, creating a thriving market for "sachet water", purified water packaged in polyethylene pouches. Water vendors called Mairuwa sell water from tanks and drums on carts, which is sometimes sold to other vendors that carry water in buckets or gerry cans. Access to water provided by the state Water Corporation is 'metropocentric' i.e., centred around the metropolis.

Due to inadequate supply to in the society, people revolted on getting water from any source for domestic use. 40% of homes depends on well for domestic use; 32% on vendors for their water; 7% of homes depends on public boreholes and 19% on tankers, river/streams and rain water which isn't available in dry season.

=== Benue ===
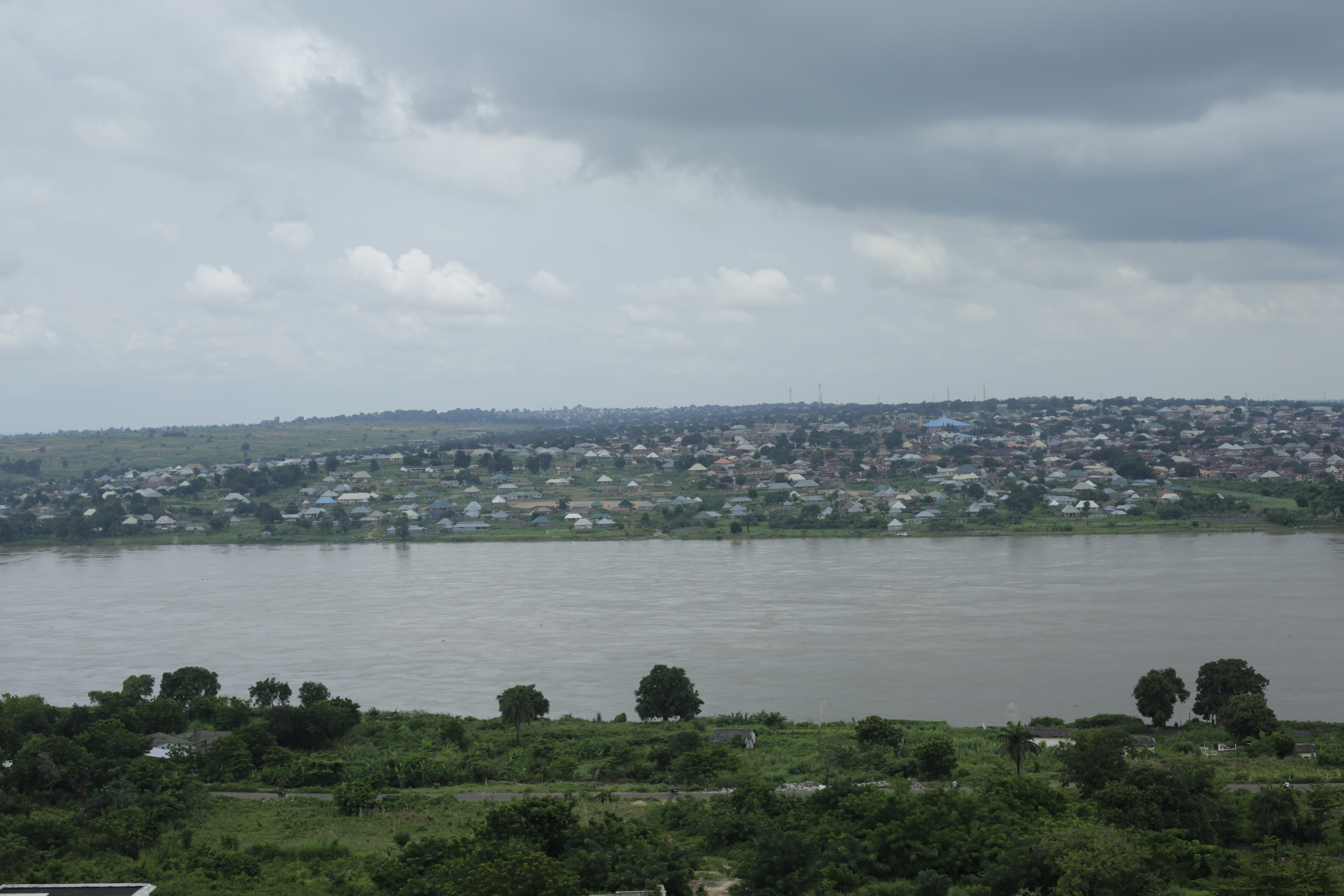
River Benue (Makurdi)

In Makurdi, the capital of Benue State, only about 25-30% of the population are served and inhabitants fetch raw water in buckets from the polluted Benue river. In 2008, the construction of a water treatment plant was left unfinished and officials were unable to account for US$6 million. As of 2012, a water treatment plant was under construction as part of the Greater Makurdi Waterworks Project. According to Nat Apir, an independent water consultant, the lack of a modern distribution network will lead pipes to burst and the capacity of the plant is at risk of not being fully utilized.

The streams/rivers contribute 27.89% in dry season and 24.16% in wet season, rainwater as 0.00% in dry season and 27.22% in wet season. In Ugbokolo community, the demand of water is higher (155,788 lpd) than the available supply (113,249 lpd) across the community.

=== Imo ===
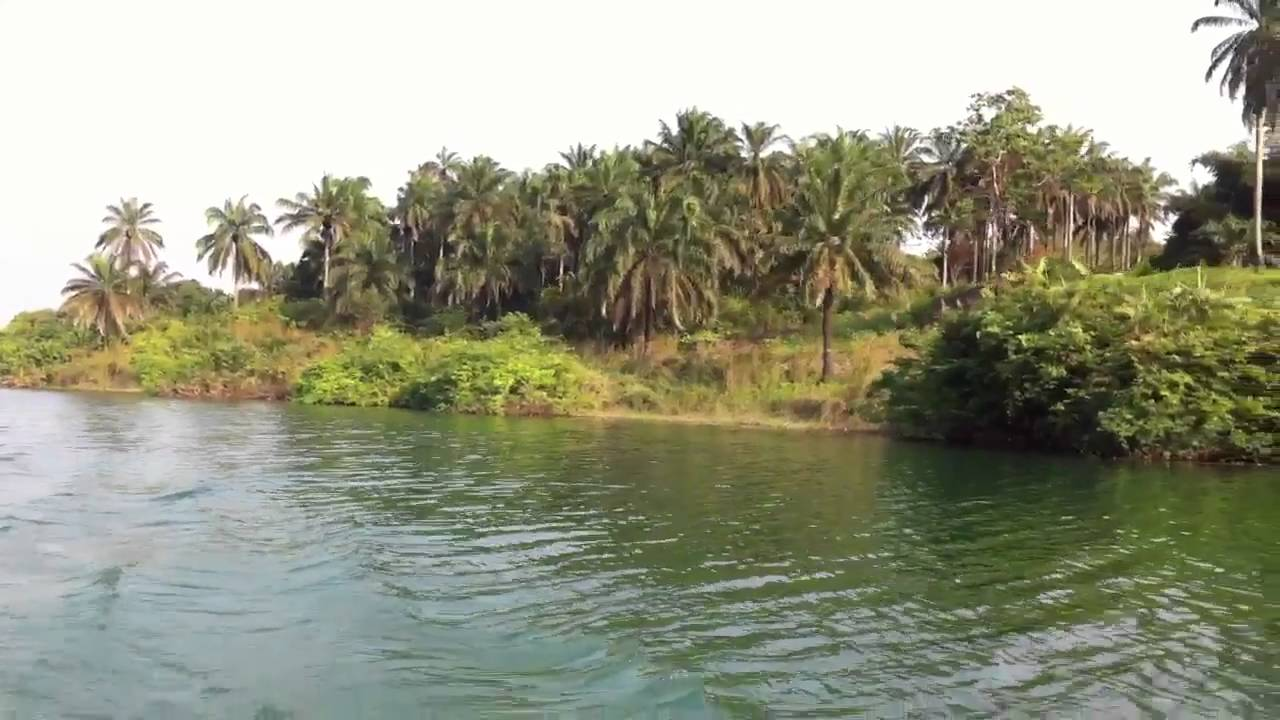
Oguta lake, Imo state

After 24 years of operating without portable water, in 2020, the Imo state government under the administration of Senator Hope Uzodinma, Governor of Imo State, released funds to revive the urban WASH sector, resulting in Imo residents having access to safely managed water supply, sanitation and hygiene services. Under Engr Emeka Celestine Ugoanyanwu, Imo State Water and Sewerage Corporation underwent major institutional, policy and regulatory transformation, leading to the rehabilitation of Otammiri Waterworks and other water schemes under the Corporation's jurisdiction. Hence the governor also directed that a holistic rehabilitation be done in the WASH sector in line with modern technology.

According to USAID, the Imo State Water and Sewerage Corporation (ISWSC) supplies water to 3 million Nigerians in Imo state.

=== Oyo ===
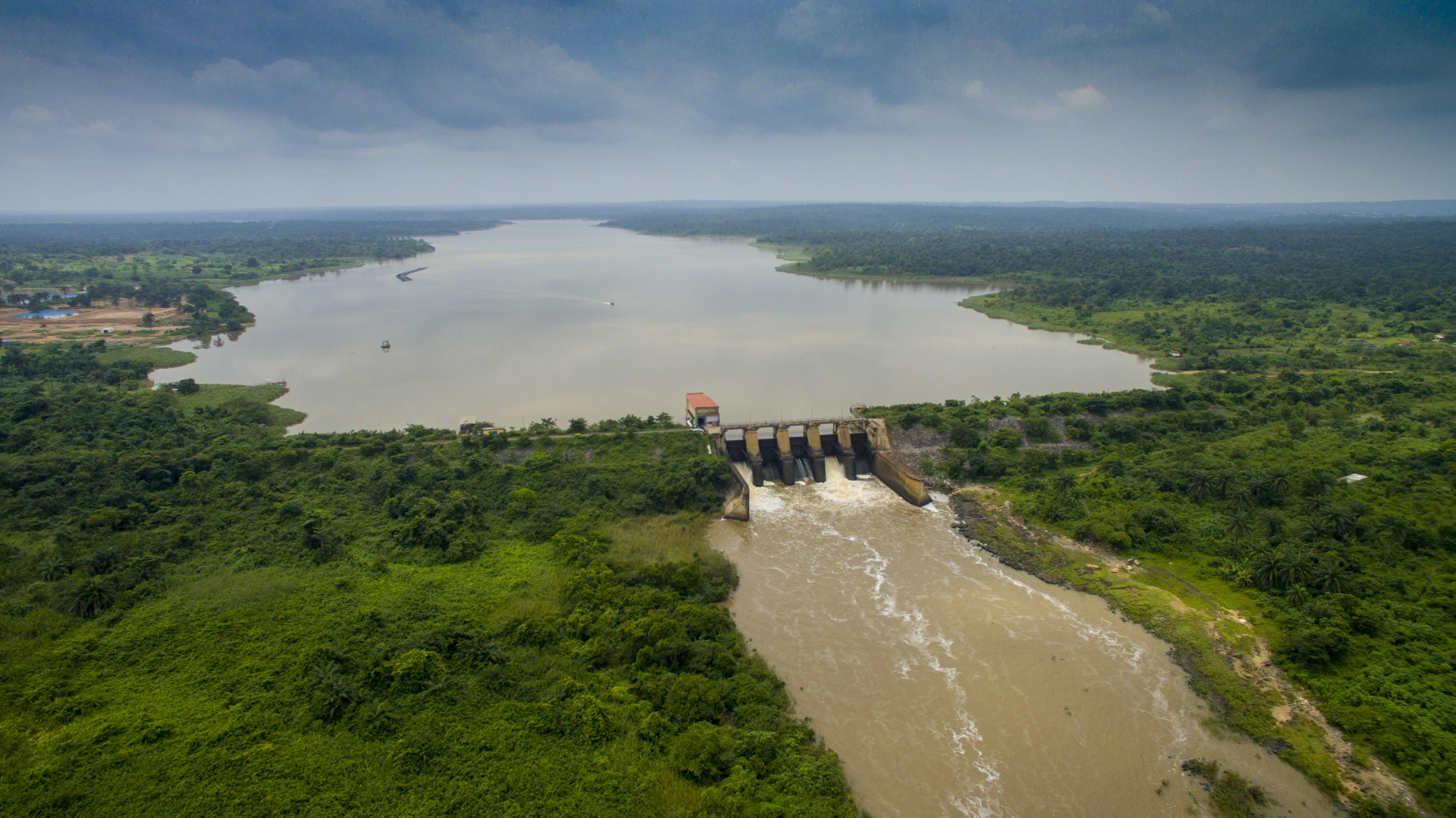
Asejire reservoir

Erelu Dam which was commissioned in 1963 is the major source of water supply to residents of Oyo and its environs and has the capacity to provide 7.5 million litres of water per day and also has the reservoir capacity of 10cm3. However, there are three water supply projects in Ibadan: Eleyele Water Works, Asejire Water Works and Osegere Water Works. Lack of water supply, burst pipes are among the challenges faced by residents of Oyo State as regards water supplies. Urban areas of Oyo state are supplied water by the Oyo State Water Corporation.

=== Edo ===
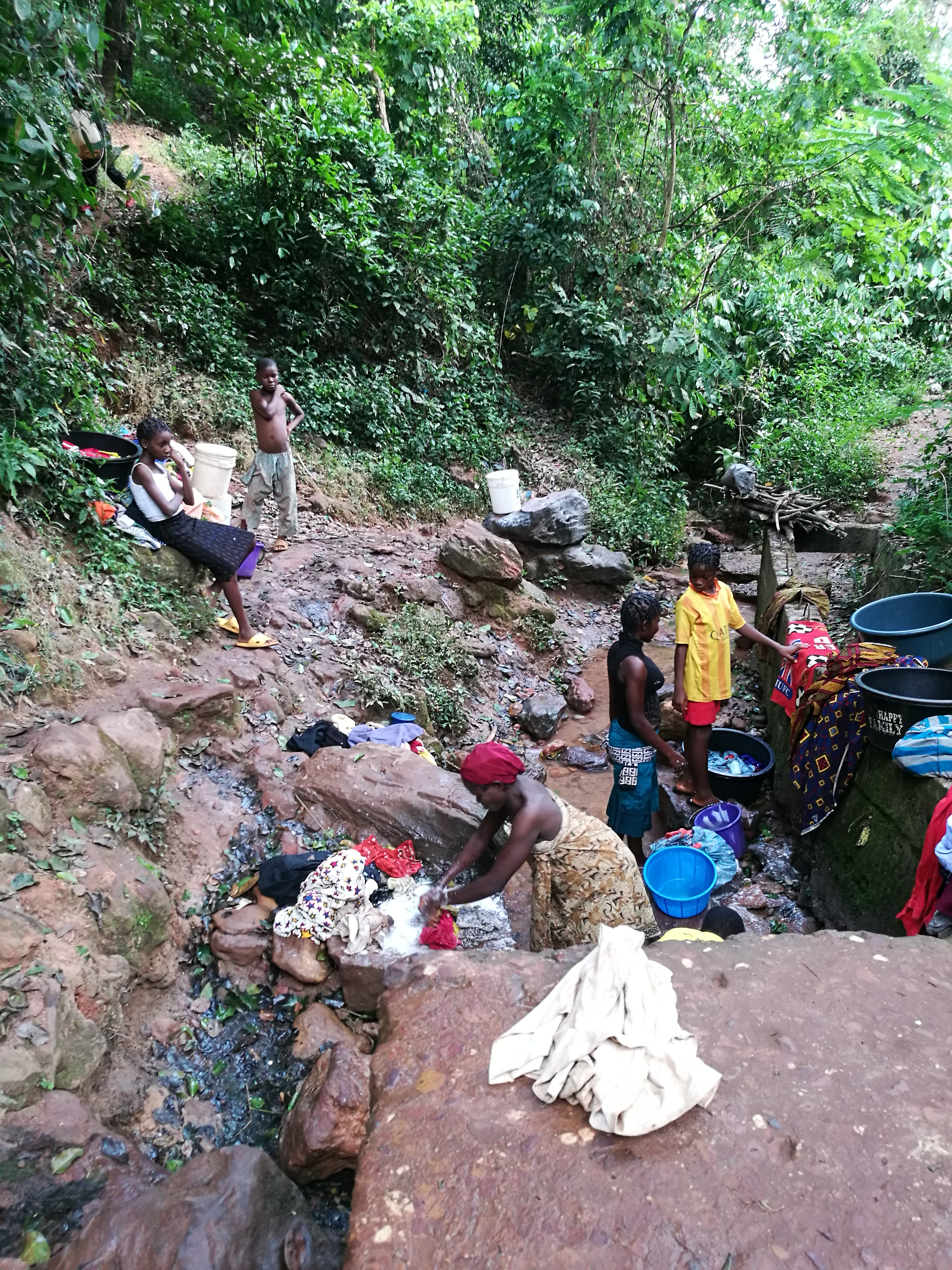
The only source of water in Itsukwi village, Edo state

The water supply system in Benin City, which depends on the Ikpoba River Dam, serves only about 30% of the population. The other 70% derive their water from the numerous boreholes sunk for private, agricultural and industrial purposes.

==== Borno ====
In Borno State, getting clean water and proper sanitation is very hard because of many years of conflict that have destroyed pipes, boreholes, and toilets. Many people in villages and camps for displaced persons fetch water from rivers, ponds, or open wells, which are often dirty and unsafe to drink. According to a 2021 report by UNICEF, only about one-third of people in Borno have access to basic clean water, and most of them still use water that contains germs. Many homes do not have toilets, so open defecation is still common in some areas. To help improve the situation, the Borno State Government and organizations like UNICEF, WaterAid, and the Red Cross (ICRC) have been fixing boreholes, building toilets, and providing clean water, especially in Maiduguri and nearby communities. Even with all these efforts, insecurity, poor maintenance, and lack of enough funds still make it difficult for many families in Borno to have safe water and good sanitation.

==== Kaduna ====
In Kaduna State, many people still struggle to get clean and safe water. A government report in 2021 showed that less than half of the people in the state have regular access to drinking water, and only a very small number get water that is properly treated and safe. In many rural areas, people fetch water from boreholes or wells, but some of these dry up during the dry season or stop working. Studies also found that most of the water used by households are not safe, as it contains germs that can cause diseases. To solve this problem, the Kaduna State Government declared a state of emergency on water and sanitation in 2020. With help from the World Bank and UNICEF, new boreholes, toilets, and water points have been built in several communities. Even though these efforts have helped many people, some challenges still remain like poor maintenance of water facilities, lack of funds, and unsafe water sources especially in villages and small towns.

=== Kano ===
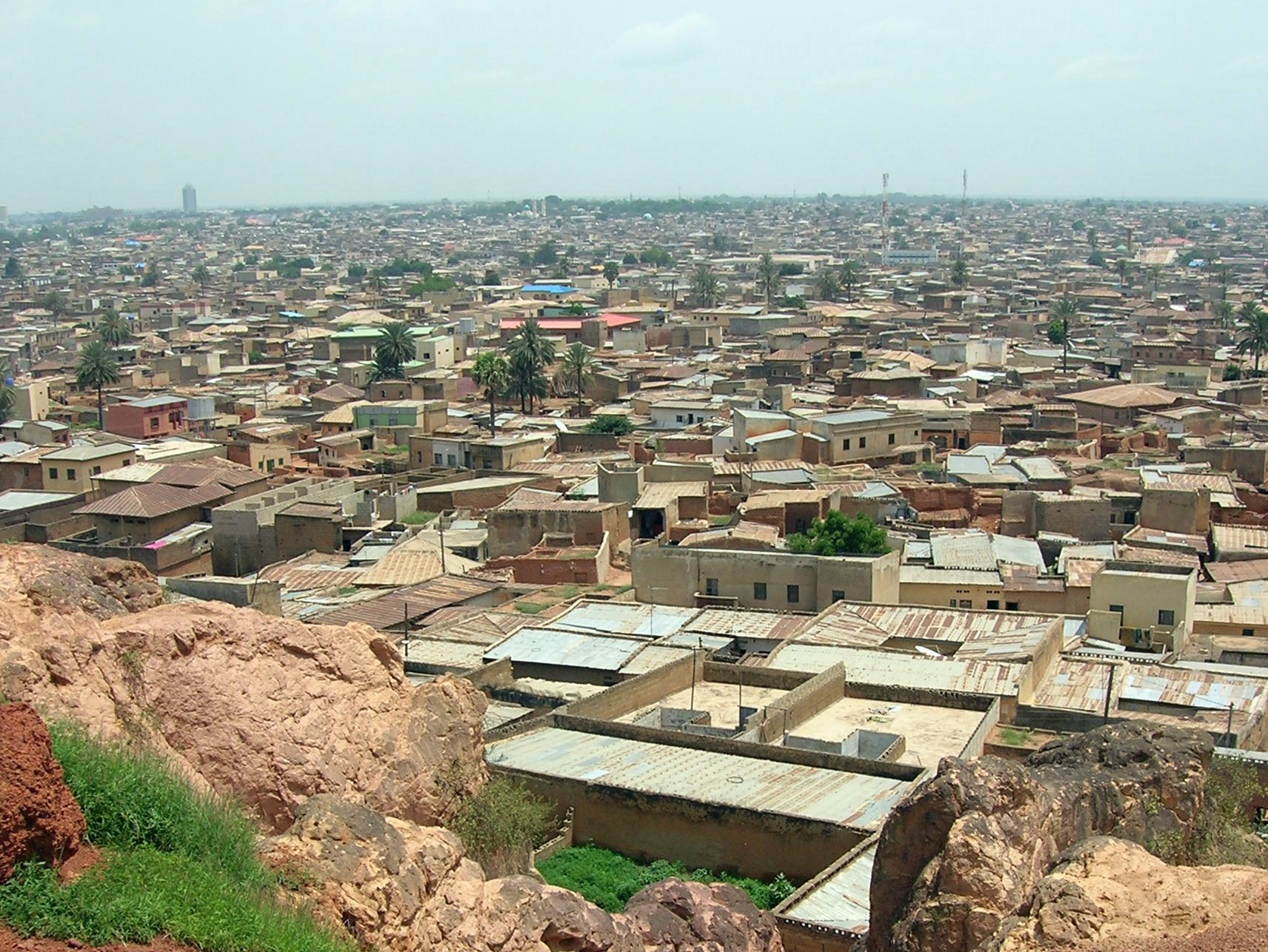
The Northern city of Kano suffers from deficient water supply.

Kano is supplied from local rivers and from groundwater which is over-exploited. Public water supply is deficient, so that private water selling points are multiplying and generate profits for their private operators. Asa Dam serves as a major water supply for Ilorin metropolis.

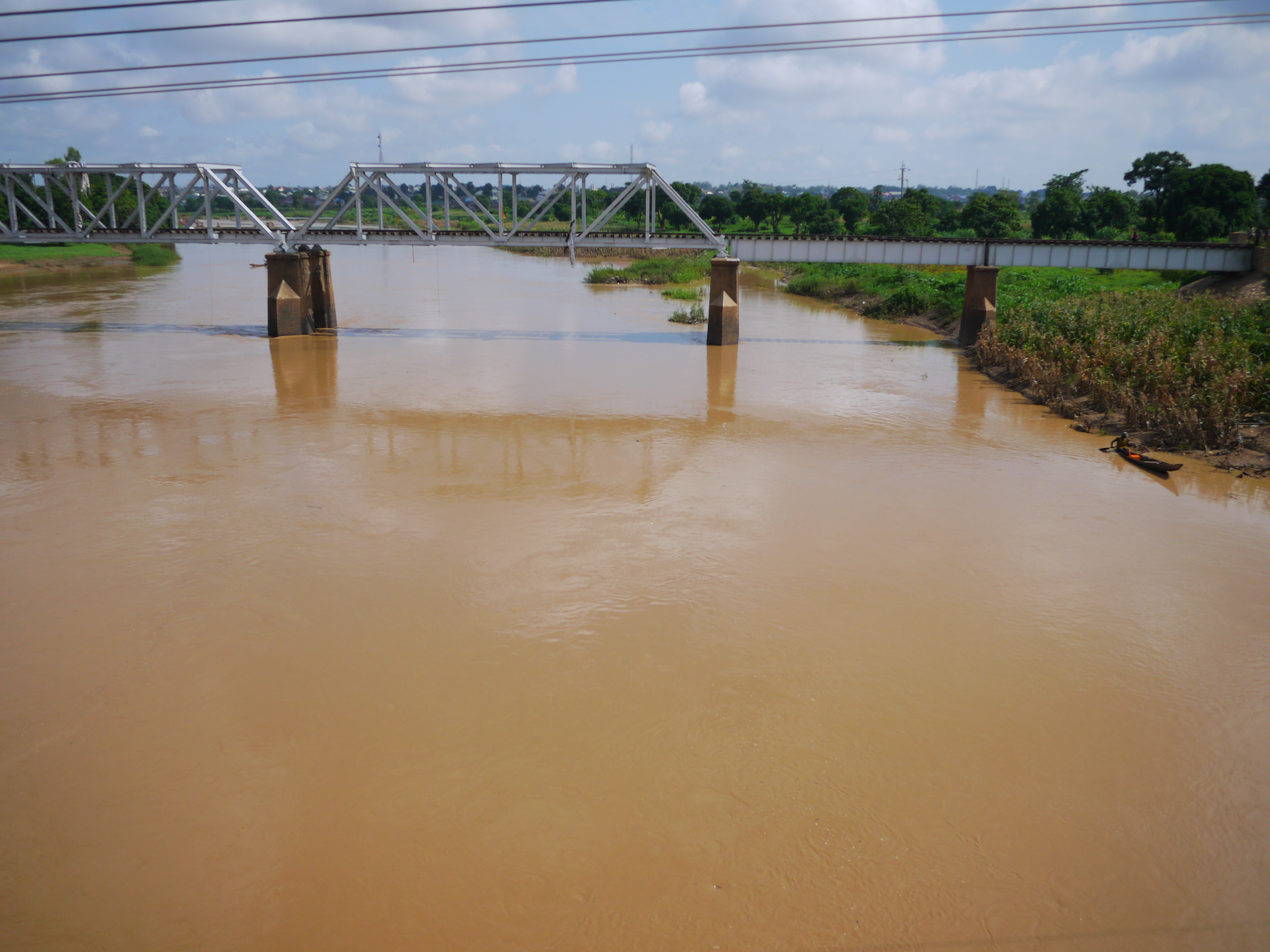
River Kaduna

== Policies and initiatives ==
Nigeria's National Water Supply and Sanitation Policy, approved in 2000, encourages private-sector participation and envisages institutional and policy reforms at the state level. However, little has happened in both respects. As of 2007, only four of the 37 states – Lagos, Cross River, Kaduna and Ogun States began to introduce public private partnership (PPP) in the form of service contracts, a form of PPP where the responsibility of the private sector is limited to operating infrastructure without performance incentives. While the government has a decentralization policy, little actual decentralization has happened. The capacity of local governments to plan and carry out investments, or to operate and maintain systems, remains low despite efforts at capacity development. Furthermore, the national policy focuses on water supply and neglects sanitation.

In 2003, a "Presidential Water Initiative (PWI): Water for People, Water for Life" was launched by then-President Olusegun Obasanjo. The initiative had ambitious targets to increase access, including a 100 percent water access target in state capitals, 75 percent access in other urban areas, and 66 percent access in rural areas. Little has been done to implement the initiative and targets have not been met.

In 2011, the government voted in the United Nations in favor of a resolution making water and sanitation a human right. However, it has not passed legislation to enshrine the human right to water and sanitation in national law. The country is not on track to reach the Millennium Development Goal for water and sanitation.

Since 2008, community-led total sanitation has been introduced in six states, with the support of UNICEF and the EU. While not being a national policy, apparently this grass-roots initiative has met with some success. More than 17,000 latrines have been built in 836 communities, and more than 100 of these communities have attained the goal of being declared free of open defecation. As of 2022, 18% of Nigerians practice open defecation.

== Responsibilities ==
The three levels of government shares responsibility for the delivery of water supply services. For example, the federal government is responsible for overseeing the water resources management, the state government supplies urban water while local governments work together with communities for rural water supply. The responsibility for sanitation is not always clear, but urban sanitation is a responsibility of state.

=== Federal government ===
The Federal Ministry of Water Resources, which had been part of the Ministry of Agriculture for a period until 2010, is responsible for large water resources development projects and water allocation between states. There are 12 River Basin Development Authorities under the Ministry, responsible for planning and developing water resources, irrigation work and the collection of hydrological, hydro-geological data. They also provide water in bulk to cities from dams. A Utilities Charges Commission was established in 1992 to monitor and regulate utility tariffs, including those of State Water Agencies.

=== State governments ===
Responsibility for potable water supply is entrusted to State Water Agencies (SWAs) or state water departments in the 36 Nigerian states. The SWAs are responsible to their state governments, generally through a State Ministry of Water Resources. SWAs are responsible for urban water supply, and in some states also for rural water supply. As of 2000, 22 states had separate state rural water and sanitation agencies, mostly set up to implement a UNICEF program. In 2010, Lagos state set up a State Wastewater Management Office under the Lagos State Water Corporation. It took the responsibility for sanitation over from the State Ministry of Environment.

=== Local governments ===
The Local Government Authorities (LGAs), of which there are 774, are responsible for the provision of rural water supplies and sanitation facilities in their areas although only a few have the resources and skills to address the problem. Only few LGAs have rural water supply divisions.

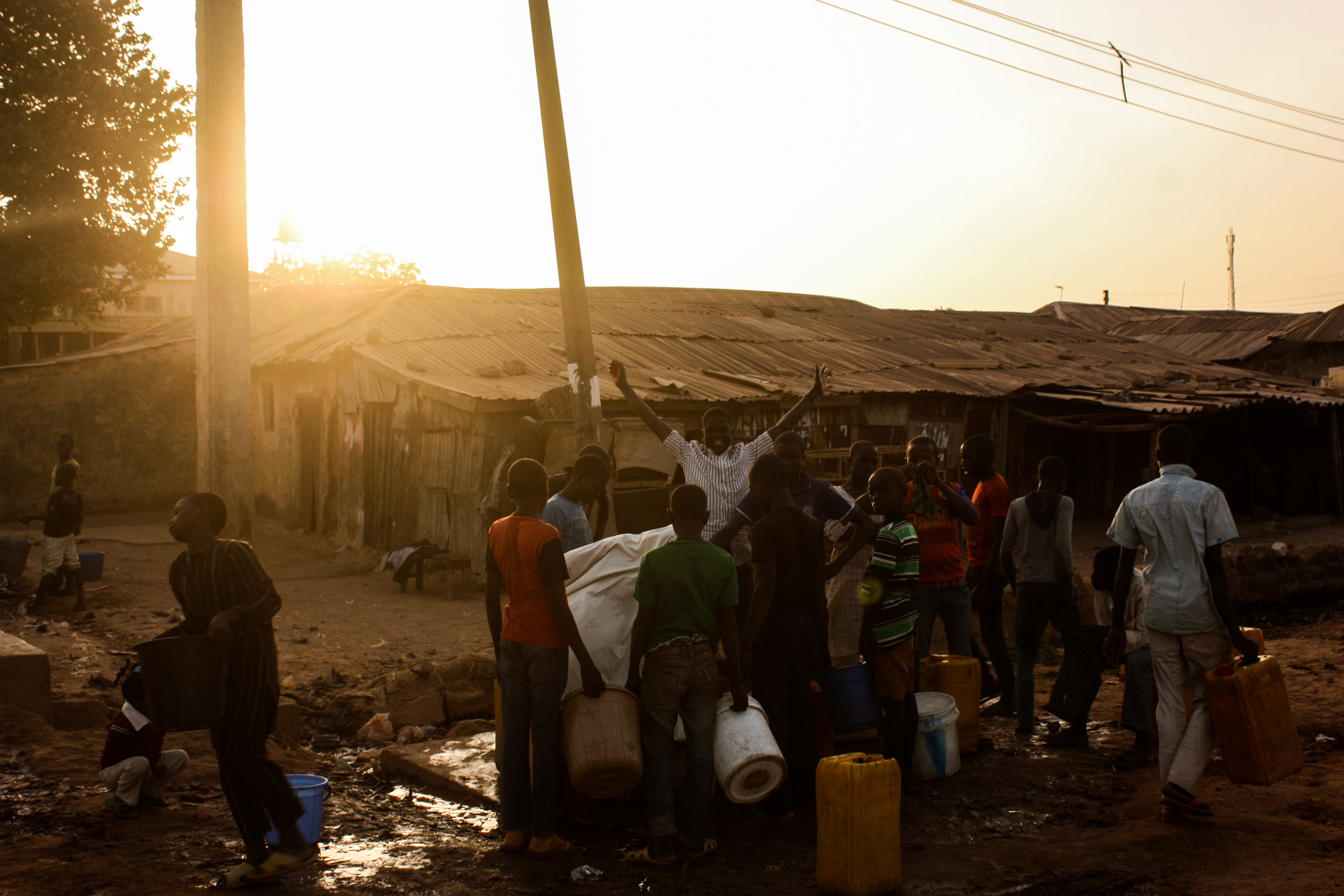

=== Communities ===
In some communities in the rural areas, water and sanitation committees (WASCOs) have been formed to operate and maintain water facilities. These committees are supposed to collect their own water tariffs. Donors such as the African Development Bank have set a requirement that at least 30% of members of WASCOs must be women. In 1993, the Government committed itself to strengthen community participation in rural water supply in a policy document. In the year 2000, the policy had not been disseminated or implemented in all government- or donor-financed programs.

=== Civil society ===
Nigeria's water and sanitation sector implements several initiatives to address sectoral crisis. The Society for Water and Sanitation (NEWSAN) is the umbrella network of WASH NGOs, while the Water and Sanitation Media Network comprises journalists reporting the sector. A non-governmental organisation in the sector is the Bread of Life Development Foundation which manages the eWASH weblog on water and sanitation news in Nigeria.

== Financial aspects ==
=== Tariffs and cost recovery ===
Flat rates for unmetered connections. Most Nigerian water supply connections are not metered. The metering ratio varies from 7% in Katsina to 16% in Kaduna and 24% in Lagos in 2007. Unmetered customers are charged a flat rate independent of consumption. For unmetered residential customers the monthly flat rate was US$3 in Lagos, US$5 in Katsina and US$11 in Kaduna. In Yobe state it was only Naira 100 (US$0.60) per month, the lowest level in the country according to the Yobe State Water Corporation. The tariff revenues covered only 2% of the costs of supplying water.

Tariffs for metered connections. Metered customers are either charged a linear tariff, as it is the case in Lagos, or an increasing-block tariff, as it is the case in Katsina and Kaduna. Under the increasing-block tariff, the tariff per cubic meter increases stepwise with consumption beginning at a consumption of 30m3 per month with a total of 3 to 6 blocks. The residential tariff for the first block of consumption is US$0.19 per m3 in Kaduna and US$0.44 per m3 in Katsina. Tariffs for commercial and industrial users are higher. The average water tariff for metered customers was Naira 50 per m3 (US$0.30) in Oyo state and Naira 16 per m3 (US$0.10) in Taraba state in 2009.

Tariff collection. Outdated information systems and inconsistent billing practices cause additional revenue losses. The revenue collection rate is very low. In some areas it is less than 10% of billed amounts. There are significant arrears, particularly from government agencies.

Tariff adjustments. Each state sets its own water tariff. Tariff adjustments need to be approved by the State Executive Council through a lengthy procedure. Being unable to cover their operating costs, and unable to secure regular revisions of the tariff, the State Water Agencies receive financial assistance from the state governments.

Vendor prices. Surveys of street vendors in Lagos, Kaduna and Katsina show that they charge as much as 20 times more than the State Water Agencies. The amount paid, for a very limited volume of supply from private water vendors, can be four to ten times that of one month's much larger volume of tap supply.

=== Investment ===
For Nigeria to meet the Millennium Development Goal for water supply by 2015, the country needs to invest approximately N215 billion (US$1.3 billion) annually. Nigeria is currently investing not more than N82.5 billion (US$0.5 billion) into the sector. Much of these investments are needed to rehabilitate infrastructure that has not been properly maintained. It is not clear if the estimate includes sanitation or not.

=== Financing ===
While all three government levels are supposed to fully participate in financing water and sanitation investments, local governments often do not have the resources to do so. State and federal levels also provide only limited funding. Thus, most public water and sanitation investments in Nigeria are financed by donors. The sharing of oil and tax revenues between different levels of government is a politically sensitive issue in Nigeria, which is divided between a Muslim North and a mostly Christian South and where one region in the South accounts for all oil revenues. Between 1948 and 2001, nine commissions, six military decrees, one Act of the legislature and two Supreme Court judgements have attempted to define fiscal interrelationships among the component parts of the federation without resolving the issue. Federal revenues include about 90 percent of government revenues, including oil royalties and import duties. These are pooled with the more limited state and local revenues, and the pooled resources are then shared by the three levels of government according to an agreed formula. After independence, the federal government received 40% of revenues and the states government also received 60%, an arrangement that would benefit the oil-producing region in the Niger Delta. Local governments had no share. After the Biafra War the share of federal government was increased to 80% in 1968, but was subsequently decreased again. Since the 1976 Local Government Reform, local government receives its own share of revenues. As of 1999, the share of local government was 20%, the state share was 24% and the share of the federal government and for special projects was 56%.

== External cooperation ==
=== African Development Bank ===
In February 2012, the African Development Bank approved a US$100 million soft loan to improve water and sanitation in the northern city of Zaria. The project will be implemented by the Kaduna State Water Board. It also approved an Urban Water Supply and Sanitation Project in the cities of Ibadan and Jalingo in Oyo and Taraba States in 2009. Both urban projects include the installation of water meters, hygiene promotion as well as the construction of toilets at schools, health clinics, market places and parks. Unlike the newer project in Zaria, the older project supports reforms at the state level to separate regulatory from operational functions, and the introduction of public-private partnerships. The African Development Bank also financed rural water and sanitation projects in Yobe and Osun States approved in 2007. The project aimed to increase the functionality of rural water supply and sanitation facilities in the two states, estimated to be below 50% in 2006, to 100% in 2012. The sanitation facilities built are sanplat latrines and ventilated improved pit latrines.

The African Development Bank finances the entire costs of these projects without requiring a contribution by the Nigerian state. The African Development Bank has invested US$905 million in the sector since 1971.

=== China ===
In 2005, China signed a grant agreement with Nigeria to drill 598 boreholes in 18 states and the FCT. The amount of the grant and the implementing agency were not specified.

=== European Union ===
The EU supports a Water Supply and Sanitation Sector Reform Programme in six states (Anambra, Cross River, Jigawa, Kano, Osun and Yobe) with 87 million Euros grant funding. The Nigerian state, at all three levels of government, and local communities are expected to contribute another 31 million Euros.

=== JICA ===
JICA is an abbreviation for Japan International Cooperation Agency and they provide grants for rural water supply and sanitation in three states, Oyo, Kano and Yobe.

=== UNICEF ===
UNICEF(United Nations Children's Fund) which was formerly known as United Nations International Children's Emergency Fund has supported rural water supply, sanitation and hygiene in communities and schools across the country since 2002. Its interventions have been financed by DFID and the European Commission. A total of 6,960 new safe water sources (boreholes, dug wells and protected springs) and over 19,100 household latrines have been constructed. Over 400 schools have been provided with latrines with separate provision for boys and girls and hand washing facilities.

=== USAID ===
USAID(United States Agency for International Development) supports rural water supply, sanitation and hygiene education in Northern Nigeria, in 46 communities in Bauchi, Kano and Sokoto States. USAID is partnering with Nigerian non-governmental agency Women Farmers Advancement Network (WOFAN), Action Against Hunger (NGO) and WaterAid.

=== WaterAid ===
WaterAid, a British NGO, promoted the integration of sanitation, water supply and hygiene education using a community-based approach and low cost appropriate technologies. It works closely with Nigerian NGOs, including the Benue NGO Network (BENGONET), Society for Water and Sanitation in Nigeria (NEWSAN), Justice Development and Peace Initiative (JDPI), Community Based Development – NGO (CBD-NGO), Women Empowerment In Nigeria (WEIN) and the Bol Development Association (BOLDA). It works in over 100 communities in the states of Bauchi, Benue and Plateau. It has developed a vulnerability ranking, based on criteria suggested by communities themselves, to help communities in selecting themselves where resources should be allocated. Such a participatory and transparent decision-making process is of particular importance in a context of low trust and poor governance.

In January 2012, it has been tasked by the government with the task of facilitating monitoring and evaluation of government water, sanitation and hygiene projects in Nigeria. According to the Minister of Water Resources, President Goodluck Jonathan is interested in an independent assessment of sector performance and NGOs are well placed to undertake this task.

=== World Bank ===
The World Bank has completed seven water projects since 1985 and had three on-going projects in 2010. Total investment for the 10 projects is about US$1.4 billion. The First Urban Water Reform Project (US$120 million) targets 13 towns in the states of Kaduna, Ogun and Enugu. The project also aims to establish state water policies, and to foster the engagement with the private sector. The second Urban Water Reform Project worth US$200 million, supports the extension of the piped network in Calabar, and the rehabilitation of water treatment plants and distribution systems in Lagos as well as another three towns in Cross River State. Under a Privatization Project, the Federal Capital Territory (FCT) Water Board is being assisted with US$25 million. In 2012, the World Bank approved a US$400 million National Urban Water Sector Reform Project for Lagos, Kaduna, Ogun, Enugu and Cross River States. In 2021, the World Bank approved a loan for $700 million for water and sanitation as part of a programme called SURWASH.
