= Ikeazor =

Ikeazor is a surname. Notable people with the surname include:

- Chimezie Ikeazor (1930–2012), Nigerian lawyer
- Sharon Ikeazor (born 1961), Nigerian lawyer
