= Ocholi =

Ocholi is a surname and given name. Notable people with the name include:

- James Ocholi (1960–2016), Nigerian politician
- Ocholi Edicha (born 1979), Nigerian badminton player
