= Reng =

Reng is a surname. Notable people with the name include:

- Ben Mang Reng Say (1928–2003), Indonesian politician
- Ronald Reng (born 1970), German sports journalist and author
- Sarah Reng Ochekpe (born 1961), Nigerian Politician

== See also ==
- Grand-Reng, is a small village located in the Belgian province of Hainaut
- Vieux-Reng, is a commune in the Nord department in northern France
