= Ernest Afolabi Umakhihe =

Nigerian accountant

Ernest Afolabi Umakhihe is Nigerian accountant, public administrator and a philanthropist. He was the immediate past Permanent Secretary of the Federal Ministry of Agriculture and Rural Development from 2021 to January 2, 2024.

== Background and Education ==
Afolabi was born in Otuo, Owan East Local Government, Edo State, on April 5, 1964. He attended Edo College, Benin City before heading on to University of Benin for his Bachelor's Degree in Accounting. He also got his MBA from University of Benin in 1997. He got a doctorate degree in Security and Strategic Studies from Nasarawa State University.

== Career ==
Afolabi joined Nigerian Institute for Oil Palm Research as an accountant. He was the Director of Finance and Accounts of the institute till 2007. He went on to work at the Office of the Accountant General of the Federation as the deputy director in the Audit Monitoring Department. He then became the Director of the Audit Monitoring Department in 2013. He has also served as Director, Finance and Accounts at the Federal Ministry of Foreign Affairs and Federal Ministry of Budget and National Planning.

He was appointed to serve as the Permanent Secretary of the Federal Ministry of Works and Housing in 2020. Afolabi was appointed to Federal Ministry of Agriculture and Rural Development as Permanent secretary in January 2021 where he also retired on January 2, 2024. Afolabi is also the chairman, Board of Trustees of the Nigerian Forum for Agricultural Advisory Services.

== Political career ==
Dr. Ernest Afolabi Umakhihe contested in the Edo State Governorship election under the platform of the All Progressives Congress (APC).
