= Nigeria Institute for Oil Palm Research =

Nigeria research institute

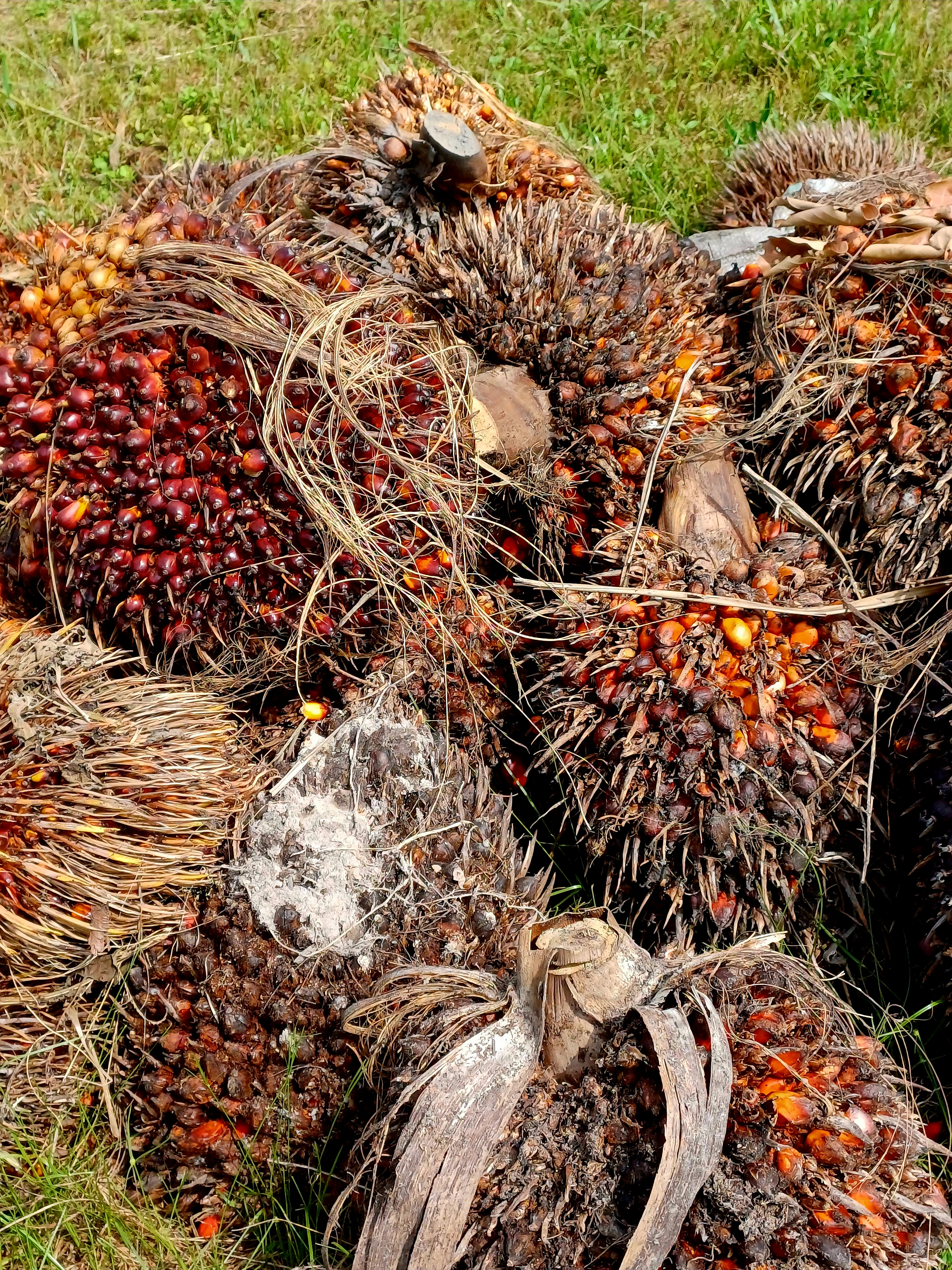
Fresh oil palm fruit

Nigeria Institute for Oil Palm Research (NIFOR) is a research center into genetic improvement, production and processing of oil palm, Raphia, date, coconut, Shea and ornamental palms. The Executive Director of the institute is Dr. Celestine Ebehiremhe Ikuenobe.

== History ==
The Nigeria Institute for Oil Palm Research (NIFOR) was established in 1939, after series of West African Agricultural conferences by the then Colonial Department of Agriculture, 1927, 1930, and 1938. A resolution was reached to the effect that research on crops should be regionalized and be carried out in its appropriate territory. The West African Research Organization was created in 1950 and stretched throughout the west coast.

The Nigeria component was renamed Nigeria Institute for Oil Palm Research (NIFOR) by the Research Institute's Act 33 of 1964. Same year, the institute mandate was expanded to include coconut, raphia, date palm and some skeletal works on coconut mostly to understand the coconut pest and diseases, coconut nutrition.

In 1967 the problems associated with date palm led to the inclusion of research on date palm in her mandate and by 1970 full operation were kick started. In 1992, the control of the institute was moved to the Federal Ministry of Agriculture.

== Activities ==
The institute had developed the high yielding Tenera oil palm seedlings. NIFOR in partnership with Institute of Agricultural Research and Training (IAR&T), Ibadan is also training scientists on how to read soil information that would serve as a guide for the formulation of fertilizer meant solely for cultivation of oil palm seedlings. The institute also works closely with the Oil Palm Growers Association of Nigeria (OPGAN) which has established a secretariat in NIFOR to close the gap between the oil palm farmers and the research findings and knowledge of the scientists in the institute.

== Recruitment ==
The institute help farmers with technical support and trainings in order for them to adopt to the best practices in Palm oil cultivation and processing, and they also offers student and researchers training programs aiming to build large capacity in the palm oil sector.
