= Lai Mohammed =

Nigerian politician and lawyer (born 1951)

Lai Mohammed CON

Minister of Information and Culture
- In office 11 November 2015 – 29 May 2023
- Preceded by: Patricia Akwashiki
- Succeeded by: Mohammed Idris Malagi

Personal details
- Born: Olayiwola Mohammed; 6 December 1951 (age 74)
- Party: All Progressives Congress (2013– present)
- Other political affiliations: Action Congress of Nigeria (2006–2013)
- Occupation: Politician; lawyer

Layiwola "Lai" Mohammed CON (born 6 December 1951) is a Nigerian lawyer and politician who served as the minister of Information and Culture of Nigeria from November 2015 to May 2023. He is also the former National publicity secretary of the All Progressives Congress.

== Biography ==
He was born into the family of Alhaji Mohammed Adekeye in 1952. He is a native of Oro in Kwara State. He earned a bachelor's degree in French from Obafemi Awolowo University in 1975. He proceeded to obtain a law degree from the University of Lagos, and then proceeded to the Nigerian Law School in 1986. As a practising lawyer, Mohammed co-founded the legal firm of Edu & Mohammed as a senior partner in 1989.

== Business ==
Mohammed is a businessman and served as the Chairman of Optmedia Limited, a subsidiary of Afromedia PLC since 18 December 2008. He served as a Director of Afromedia PLC since May 2011. Mohammed is also a fellow of the Nigerian Institute of Public Relations (NIPR) and worked as Public Relations Officer for almost 10 years with the Nigerian Airport Authority, now Federal Airport Authority of Nigeria (FAAN).

== Politics ==
In October 2002, Mohammed was a candidate for governor in the April 2003 Kwara State elections on the Alliance for Democracy platform. He was assaulted and five vehicles in his convoy were smashed in front of Senator Suleiman Ajadi's campaign office at Oke-Onigbin during a festivity. He served as Governor Tinubu's Chief of Staff during his first term.

Mohammed is an active politician and was the National Publicity Secretary of All Progressive Congress (APC) in Nigeria. He was on 11 November 2015 sworn in by President Muhammadu Buhari as Minister of Information and Culture following his appointment and successful screening by the Nigerian Senate. On 21 August 2019, he was again re-appointed by Buhari as Minister of Information and Culture.

He has been accused by some local and international news about giving contradictory accounts of events in his country and false information. This is evidential in his #EndSARS accounts, which were at first, different from those claimed by the Lagos State government and the Nigerian Army. In his interview with DW TV, Tim Sebastian accused him of being "out of the loops" of his country's politics.

He had accused CNN of being "desperate", after the international media released several footages, to prove the massacre of the protesters at the Lekki tollgate, Lagos, Nigeria. However, CNN had requested substantial proof to prove that the media outlet had reported "Fake news," as he claimed.

== Award ==
In October 2022, a Nigerian national honour of Commander of the Order of the Niger (CON) was conferred on him by President Muhammadu Buhari.

== See also ==
- First cabinet of President Muhammadu Buhari
- Second cabinet of President Muhammadu Buhari
