= Abba Sayyadi Ruma =

Nigerian politician (1962–2021)

Federal Minister of Agriculture and Water Resources
- In office 26 July 2007 – 17 March 2010
- Preceded by: Adamu Bello
- Succeeded by: Sheikh Ahmed Abdullah

Personal details
- Born: 13 March 1962
- Died: 27 October 2021 (aged 59)
- Spouse: Hajiya Rabi Abba Sayyadi Ruma
- Children: 8

Abba Sayyadi Ruma (13 March 1962 – 27 October 2021) was appointed Federal Minister of Agriculture and Water Resources in Nigeria by President Umaru Yar'Adua on 26 July 2007. He left office in March 2010 when acting president Goodluck Jonathan dissolved his cabinet.

He was chairman of the Governing Council of the International Fund for Agricultural Development headquartered in Rome, Italy, and was a Partner Minister of the United Nations Educational, Scientific and Cultural Organization (UNESCO).

== Background ==
Ruma was born on 13 March 1962. He gained a BA in history from the University of Sokoto, a Masters in International Affairs and Diplomacy from Ahmadu Bello University, Zaria, and a PhD in international relations from the University of Abuja.

== Early career ==
Ruma obtained a position as information officer in Katsina State, and became special adviser to Saidu Barda, the governor of Katsina State in 1992. Between 1999 and 2003, Ruma was chairman and chief executive officer of Rascom Network Ltd, a company based in Kaduna that consults on research and development.

Ruma was the chairman of Batsari Local Government Area in Katsina State in 2003, and strongly supported the PDP candidates. He became secretary to the Katsina State Government in 2003, when Umaru Musa Yar'Adua was governor.

He was appointed Minister of State in the Federal Ministry of Education in 2005 under Dr. Obiageli Ezekwesili, and in 2007 briefly became Federal Minister of Education when Ezekwesili left to take up a World Bank job.

He was married to Hajiya Rabi and Hajiya Khadija and had twelve children.

== Minister of Agriculture and Water Resources ==
In 2007, President Umaru Musa Yar'Adua appointed Ruma Minister of Agriculture and Water Resources.

Ruma was seen as one of Yar'Adua's most esteemed colleagues. It had been expected that Yar'Adua would appoint Ruma as minister of education, since Ruma had previously served as minister of state for education and was widely believed to be part of the reform process.

In May 2008, Ruma denied reports that Nigeria was suffering from a food crisis, saying the only problem was with the rising cost of rice. He defended his ministry's decision to centralize distribution of fertilizer rather than relying on private enterprise, and noted that the government was taking action to improve access to credit by farmers and to supply more tractors. But the government would import rice if needed to cushion cost increases.

In July 2009, talking to a stakeholders' roundtable of the National Food Security Advocacy Group, he said that in the past middlemen contractors and politicians skimmed off subsidies for fertilizers which did not get to the farmers in time for the planting season, and then were grossly overpriced.

Speaking to journalists in November 2009 on the government's Public Private Partnership in the area of rice production, Ruma explained the government was looking at linking up large-scale private sector operators with farmers' cooperative groups to achieve economies of scale, and was providing funds for small-scale irrigation with focus on the most productive areas. N200 billion was available for farmers' credit, but release of the funds would be carefully monitored to ensure it went to the intended recipients.

In November 2009, Ruma was considered to be leader of a faction of the People's Democratic Party (PDP) opposed to the reelection in 2011 of Governor Ibrahim Shema. His "Abuja Group", which included Dr. Tanimu Yakubu, Senator Garba Yakubu Lado and businessman Dahiru Mangal, were all said to be acolytes of Yar’Adua.
