= Federal Ministry of Agriculture and Rural Development =

Agriculture ministry of Nigeria

Agency overview
- Formed: 1967
- Jurisdiction: Government of Nigeria
- Agency executive: Mustapha Baba Shehuri, Minister

The Federal Ministry of Agriculture and Rural Development is a ministry of the Federal Government of Nigeria that has the mandate to ensure food security in crop, livestock and fisheries, stimulate agricultural employment and services, promote the production and supply of raw materials to Agro-allied industries, provide markets for the products of the industrial sector, generate foreign exchange aid and rural Socio-economic development throughout Nigeria. Mohammad Mahmood Abubakar is the current minister of Agriculture and Rural Development. Abubakar replaced Sabo Nanono and took charge of the affairs of the ministry of Agriculture and Rural Development in September 2021, after he was redeployed from the Federal Ministry of Environment by President Muhammadu Buhari.

== History ==
The Federal Ministry of Agriculture and Natural Resources was created in the year 1966, it has passed through a serial modification of appellations to suit the prevailing climes of mergers and demergers with related sectors.

The Federal Ministry of Agriculture emerged in 1967 along with the creation of 12 States from 4 Regions in Nigeria post Independence. Each State has its own Ministry of Agriculture and Natural Resources.For example Ebonyi State has its own. In April 2010 when Goodluck Jonathan appointed Sheikh Ahmed Abdullah the Ministry of Water Resources became separate from the Ministry of Agriculture and Rural. The ministry was previously headed by Adamu Bello, Abba Sayyadi Ruma and Sheikh Ahmed Abdullah.

Akinwumi Adesina was appointed Federal Minister of Agriculture and Rural Development by President Goodluck Jonathan in June 2011. He was succeeded by Audu Innocent Ogbeh who was appointed by President Muhammadu Buhari in 2015. Audu was not retained by President Buhari for his second term and was replaced by Sabo Nanono in 2019. Mustapha Baba Shehuri is the current Minister of State while Ernest Afolabi Umakhihe is the current permanent secretary for the Federal Ministry of Agriculture and Rural Development.

== Responsibilities ==
The ministry is responsible for various roles involving national goals of rural development, food security, rural income growth and job creation. The ministry fulfills its responsibilities through its departments and parastatals. It also supervises and provides funding for research institutes such as the National Root Crops Research Institute, National Animal Production Research Institute (NAPRI), National Veterinary Research Institute (NVRI) the Rubber Research Institute of Nigeria (RRIN) and Colleges of Agriculture and Forestry among others. The Rubber Research Institute of Nigeria (RRIN) is situated in IYANOMO VILLAGE, off Benin/Sapele Highway, Benin City, Edo State.

== See also ==
- Rural development in Nigeria
- Agriculture in Nigeria
