= Umar Ibrahim El-Yakub =

Nigerian politician (born 1976)

Senior Special Assistant to the President on National Assembly Matters (House of Representatives)
- Incumbent
- Assumed office 2019
- Preceded by: Kawu Sumaila

Member of the House of Representatives
- In office 2003–2007
- Constituency: Kano Municipal

Personal details
- Born: Kano State, Nigeria
- Party: All Progressives Congress (APC)
- Occupation: Politician

Umar Ibrahim El-Yakub is a Nigerian politician who has served as a member of the 5th Nigeria National Assembly, representing Kano Municipal Federal Constituency from 2003 until 2007.

During his tenure as a member of the National Assembly, El-Yakub has sponsored over 09 bills, co-sponsored several others, and introduced motions in the House of Representatives. In 2019, he was appointed Senior Special Assistant to the President of the 9th Nigeria National Assembly on assembly matters. He assumed this role following the resignation of Kawu Sumaila.

== Early life and education ==
Umar Ibrahim El-Yakub was born in January 1976 in Kano State, Nigeria. He holds a National Diploma in Banking and Finance from A.B.U. Zaria and Kaduna Polytechnic.

== Career ==
He served as a member of Nigeria's National Assembly, representing the House of Representatives from 2003 to 2007, after being elected under the All Nigeria Peoples Party (ANPP). In 2019, he was appointed by President Muhammadu Buhari as Senior Special Assistant to the President for NASS Matters (House of Representatives).
