= Minister of Water Resources (Nigeria) =

Government Ministry of Nigeria

The Minister of Water Resources of Nigeria is a cabinet official in the Nigerian Federal Executive Council.

The Minister is assisted by the Permanent Secretary of the Ministry of Water Resources, a career civil servant. The current Minister of Water Resources is Engineer Suleiman Hussein Adamu and the permanent secretary is Dr. Musa Wen Ibrahim At various times the ministry has been amalgamated with the Federal Ministry of Agriculture.

In April 2010 when Goodluck Jonathan appointed Sheikh Ahmed Abdullah as Minister of Agriculture, the Ministry of Water Resources became separate from the Ministry of Agriculture.

== Ministers of Water Resources ==
Name	Term
Mohammed Bello Kaliel	1999 – 13 June 2001
Muktar Shagari	13 June 2001 – 10 January 2007
Ahmed Bello	January 2007 – May 2007
Sarah Reng Ochekpe	12 July 2011 – 29 May 2015
Suleiman Hussein Adamu	since 11 November 2015

== See also ==
- Federal Ministries of Nigeria
- Nigerian Civil Service
