= Adamu Bello =

Nigerian technocrat

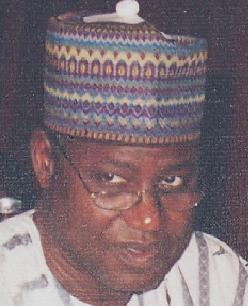
- Adamu Bello

Federal Ministry of Agriculture and Rural Development
- In office February 2001 – January 2007
- Preceded by: Sani Daura

Federal Minister of Agriculture and Water Resources
- In office January 2007 – May 2007
- Succeeded by: Abba Sayyadi Ruma

Personal details
- Born: 20 May 1951 (age 75)
- Profession: Banker, Politician

Adamu Bello (born 20 May 1951) is a Nigerian politician who was Federal Minister of Agriculture and Rural Development from 2001 to 2007. He also headed the consolidated Ministry of Agriculture and Water Resources from January to May 2007.

== Early life and education ==
Bello was born in 1951 in Numan, Adamawa State, Nigeria, the son of Justice Mohammed Bello. He had a comfortable childhood with a complete education. Justice Bello died in 1956 leaving Adamu in the care of his oldest brother, Justice Aminu Bello.

Bello graduated with a Bachelor of Science in Economics from Ahmadu Bello University, Zaria in 1975, and completed a Master of Business Administration (MBA) at the University of Pittsburgh in 1982. He attended Harvard Business School's six-week Advanced Management Program (AMP) in 1990.

== Banking career ==
Bello started his career in banking in 1976 as an investment executive with the New Nigerian Development Company (NNDC). Between 1976 and 1981, he rose to become the general manager of New-Devco Finance, a subsidiary of NNDC. In 1983, Bello joined Habib Bank as deputy Managing director, subsequently becoming managing director and then chief executive in 1988, remaining in the position until 1994. After leaving the bank he became a financial adviser, a real estate developer, and shareholder in numerous ventures until he was nominated as the chairman of the board of directors of Intercity Bank in 1998, followed by his appointment as the chairman of the board of directors of Habib Nigeria Bank in 1999, where he had previously been chief executive officer.

== Minister of Agriculture and Rural Development ==
In January 2001, Bello was nominated by the President of Nigeria, Olusegun Obasanjo, to be Minister of Agriculture and Rural Development, and he took up the post in February 2001. President Obasanjo renominated Bello after being re-elected in May 2003.

With Bello as Minister, the Ministry of Agriculture and Rural Development improved the road network from rural areas to urban markets and provided water facilities to aid the irrigation of farmlands, sometimes in conjunction with the Ministry of Water Resources and the United Nations.

Bello is the longest-serving Nigerian Agriculture Minister.

== Minister of Agriculture and Water Resources ==
In January 2007, the number of ministries was cut from 34 to 19. The Federal Ministry of Agriculture and Rural Development and the Ministry of Water Resources were merged to become the largest ministry, with Bello as the Minister of Agriculture and Water Resources with two Ministers of State.

=== Controversy ===
Four months after Bello assumed his new post, he approved the import of a few million tons of beans into Nigeria from Burkina Faso, a decision which was strongly criticised in the media.

Bello was also accused by former chairman of the Senate Committee on Agriculture, Senator Bode Olowoporoku, of conspiring with foreign companies to defraud the country in a 3.4 billion Naira deal over fertilizer imports. According to the allegations, a bag of fertilizer was said to cost N1500 in Ukraine, the main import country, but was allegedly sold by the ministry for N2800 with the margin on each taken by the minister. Bello told the Federal Cabinet that the disparity was due to transport and duties costs incurred during the delivery of the fertilizer from Ukraine to Nigeria, which was accepted by the Cabinet. The case was dismissed by the Economic and Financial Crimes Commission (EFCC) and Independent Corrupt Practices Commission (ICPC).

Olowoporoku continued with his proceedings against Bello, even escorting the minister of state for agriculture, Bamidele Dada, out of the Senate chambers when he came to discuss the matter. Bello said that Olowoporoku had a vendetta against him due to not being awarded fertilizer contracts during the process, which could have earned him N200 million. The senator denied ever requesting contracts from the Ministry, but an investigation concluded that Bello was correct, and the Senate relieved Olowoporoku of his position as chairman of the Committee on Agriculture and excluded him from all committees. He was eventually expelled from the ruling Peoples Democratic Party. The affair was widely covered in the media.

== Titles and conferment ==
Bello was conferred with the chieftaincy title of the "Dan Iyan Adamawa" in 1989 by the chieftaincy council of his native Gongola State. In 2003, he also received another chieftaincy title; "Otun Babalakin" in Ekiti State.

Bello was made a fellow of the Chartered Institute of Bankers of Nigeria (FCIB) in 1991. He was awarded an Honorary Doctorate (Honoris Causa) by the Ladoke Akintola University of Technology.

Bello was named a Commander of the Order of the Federal Republic in December 2006, the first serving member of the Federal Cabinet to be decorated in this way. He has also received numerous leadership awards, and has been nominated for Minister of the Year Awards by numerous media organisations in Nigeria.

== Personal life ==
Bello is married to pharmacist Lubabatu Bello, and they have six children.
