= Aisha Abubakar =

Nigerian politician

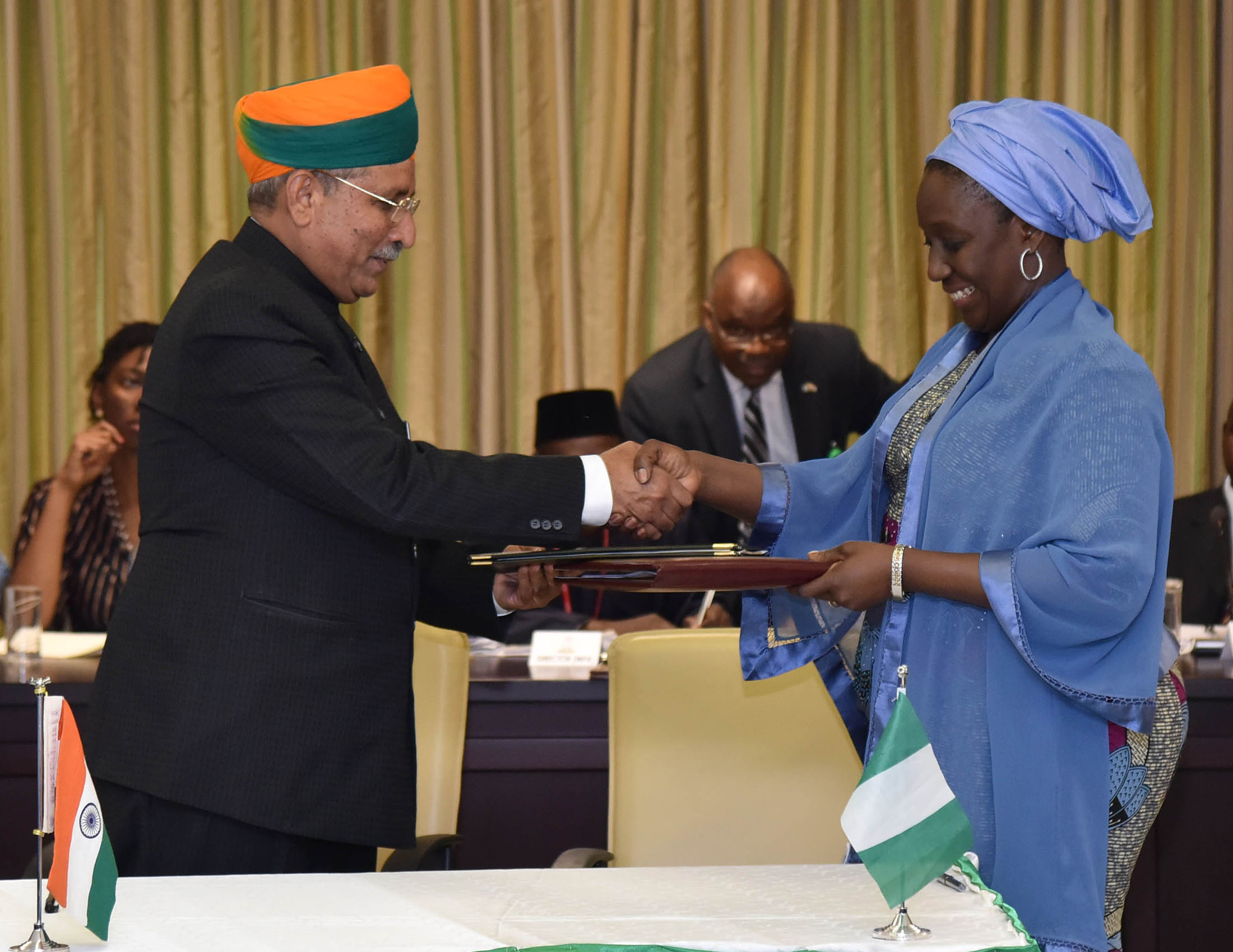
- Aisha Abubakar

Minister of State for Industry, Trade and Investment
- Incumbent
- Assumed office 2015

Personal details
- Born: 20 July 1966 (age 60) Sokoto State
- Education: Queens College; University of Warwick; University of Leeds

Aisha Abubakar is a Nigerian politician. Following the 2015 Nigerian general elections, she was appointed as the Minister of State for Industry, Trade and Investment by President Muhammadu Buhari in 2015.

== Early life and education ==
Hajiya Aisha Abubakar was born on July 20, 1966, in Dogondaji, Sokoto State. She is the daughter of a former finance minister, Abubakar Alhaji. She had her secondary education at Queens College, Lagos between 1978 and 1984. She got her first degree from University of Warwick, obtaining a Bachelor of Arts in Politics and International Studies between 1987 and 1990. She also earned a Master of Arts degree in Development Studies from University of Leeds between 1990 and 1991. She was also appointed to oversee the women's affairs as Mrs. Aisha Alhassan resigns and will still maintain her position as the Minister of State for Industry, Trade and Investment.

== Career ==
Aisha started her career in public service and development administration building her experience in pension administration, investment banking, microcredit management, rural enterprise development and human resource management. For three years she worked in both public and private sectors, especially in areas related to economic development and public policy. She has also been involved in Mentorship and advocacy programmes for women and young people, drawing from her experience in governance and international development. She has also participated in educational and institutional administration as a member of the governing council of Igbinedion University.

== Policy focus and impact ==
During her time in public office Aisha focused on policies that aimed at strengthening industrial development trade facilitation and economic growth. She contributed to improving Nigeria's investment climate and encouraging private sectors participation in economic development. Aisha also focused on federal economic and policy groups.she was involved in programmes focused on women empowerment, child welfare, and social inclusion.

== Political career ==
Abubakar worked at African Development Bank between 1993 and 1999. She was later appointed Minister of State for Industry, Trade and Investment in November 2015. In October 2017, she supervised the hiring of an appraising agency by The Bank of Industry (BOI), Nigerian Export-Import Bank and some other government parastatals. During the signing of the MoU, she explained that the aim of the agency was to alleviate the funding of small and medium enterprises in the country. In the same year, she opined that due to renewed interest of government in the agricultural sector, Nigeria's cocoa production will increase by 50% in 2021.

Abubakar has also advocated for the unity of Nigeria through diversification across different parts of the country, explaining that educational institutions should build individuals who will aid this diversification. To commemorate International Women's Day 2017, Abubakar empowered 200 women in her home state through resources and skills on new methods of utilizing agricultural produce.
