= Sabo Nanono =

Nigerian politician (born 1946)

Minister of Agriculture and Rural Development
- In office 21 August 2019 – 1 September 2021
- President: Muhammadu Buhari
- Preceded by: Audu Ogbeh
- Succeeded by: Mohammad Mahmood Abubakar

Personal details
- Born: 11 April 1946 (age 80) Gabasawa, Kano State
- Party: All Progressives Congress
- Education: Ahmadu Bello University; University of Wisconsin-Madison; Harvard Business School
- Profession: Lecturer; banker

Alhaji Muhammad Sabo Nanono (born 11 April 1946) is a Nigerian politician. He served as Minister of Agriculture and Rural Development appointed by President Muhammadu Buhari until being fired on 1 September 2021.

== Background and education ==
Nanono was born on 11 April 1946, in Tofai, Gabasawa, Kano State. He is married and has many children. He obtained his first school leaving certificate in Gwarba Primary School, Kano State and he obtained his Senior Secondary School Certificate from government secondary school, Kano. In 1972, Nanono received a Bachelor’s Degree in Business Administration from Ahmadu Bello University and a Master’s Degree in Public Policy and Administration from the University of Wisconsin-Madison in 1977. Thereafter in 1994, he attended an Advanced Management course at Harvard Business School in Boston.

== Career ==
Nanono started his career as a clerk in central bank of Nigeria in Kano state. In 1972, he served as the planning officer in Kano State Government. Nanono worked as a university lecturer from 1973 to 1978. In July 1978, he worked with the New Nigeria Development Company as the Senior Investment Executive. From 1980 to 1983, Nanono served as the Managing Director and Chief Executive of the Kano State Investment and Properties Limited. Thereafter, Nanono became a Banker and later rose to the position of a Managing Director and Chief Executive of African International Bank Limited. Sabo Nanono worked with other various organizations before he was appointed by President Muhammadu Buhari as the Minister of Agriculture and Rural Development.
