= Ibrahim Usman Jibril =

Nigerian traditional ruler

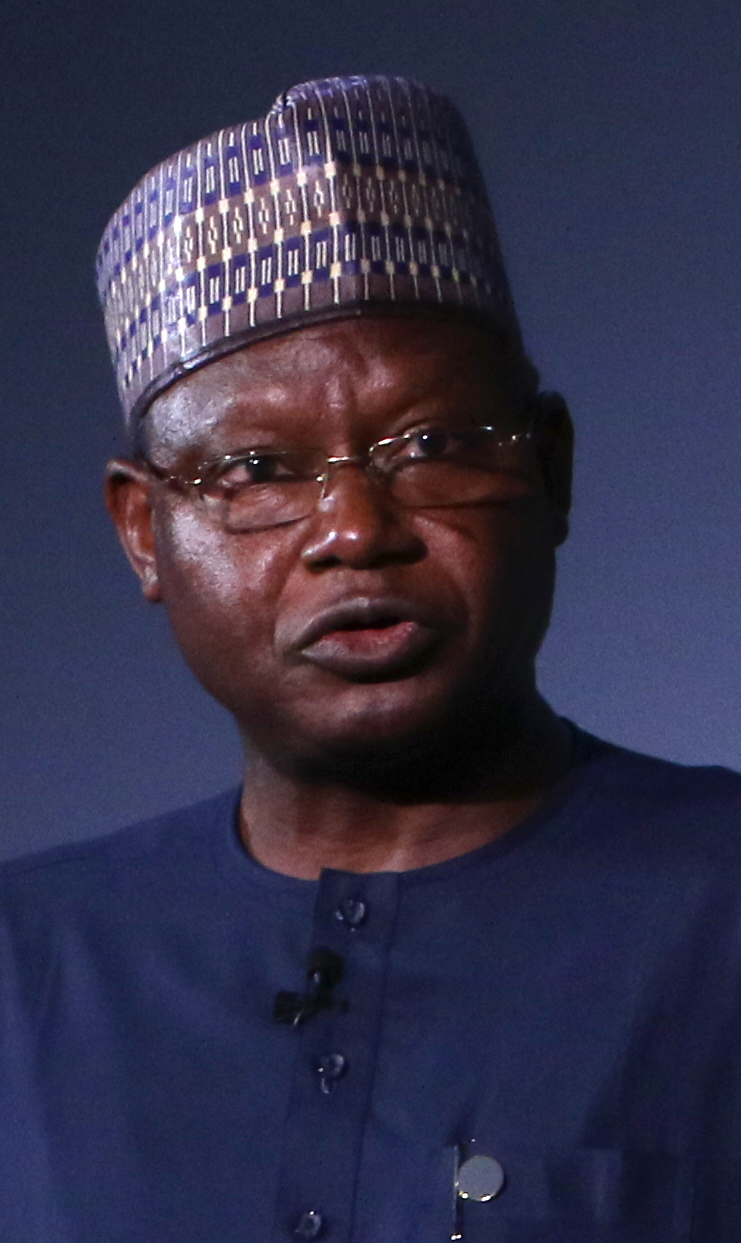
- Ibrahim Jibril in 2018

Nigeria Minister of State for Environment
- In office November 11, 2015 – December 2018
- Succeeded by: Sharon Ikeazor

Emir of Nasarawa Emirate
- Incumbent
- Assumed office December 7, 2018
- Preceded by: Alhaji Hassan Ahmad II

Personal details
- Born: January 27, 1958 (age 68) Nasarawa
- Education: Bayero University Kano
- Occupation: Teacher; administrator

Ibrahim Usman Jibril CON (born January 27, 1958) is a Nigerian traditional ruler and administrator. He is the 12th emir of Nasarawa Emirate and was the minister of state for environment between 2015 and 2018 in the President Muhammadu Buhari-led administration.

== Early life ==
Ibrahim Jibril was born on January 27, 1958, in Nasarawa town to Alhaji Usman Maikwato Jibril and Hajiya Fatima Ibrahim. His grandfather, Malan Jibril, was the eldest son of the 8th emir of Nasarawa, Umaru Maje Haji. He is the great grandson of Sarki Umaru Maje Haji and thus a direct descendant of Umaru Makama Dogo who founded the Nasarawa Emirate.

== Education ==
His education followed the Muslim traditional pattern of Koranic studies which he began at the palace's Koranic school under the tutelage of Mallam Baba and later Mallam Jibril Jatau of Bakin Kogi quarters. He completed primary education at the Nasarawa Central Primary School before proceeding to the Government Secondary School in Nasarawa. From 1976 to 1978, he went to the School of Preliminary Studies at Yola in Adamawa State. Between 1980 and 1983, he studied at Bayero University Kano where he graduated with a Bachelor of Science degree in education and geography. His brilliance and insatiable quest for education spurred him to obtain a master's degree in land resource and administration from Bayero University Kano in 1990.

== Career ==
After obtaining his Secondary School Certificate, he was invited to teach at Nasarawa Central Primary School and on completion of his BSc degree, he did his mandatory youth service at the Nigerian Army School of Artillery in Kachia, Kaduna State, as an instructor in map reading. In 1984, he was temporarily a lecturer at the Federal Polytechnic Nasarawa and later joined the Plateau State Ministry of Education where he was posted to New Karshi as a teacher. In 1985, he transferred his service to the Federal Capital Territory (FCT), Abuja, where he continued his teaching profession at the Government Secondary School, Kuje, for two years. After obtaining his master's degree in 1990, Jibril left the teaching profession and joined the Department of Land, Planning and Survey of the FCT as a land officer. His intelligence, energy and geniality made him the indispensable man as he was made the secretary to the Committee on Abuja Plan, a committee responsible for collating all data and information on land area and allocated lots in the FCT, Abuja. Altogether, he spent 25 years as a land officer in the FCT. As a land reform specialist, he was the deputy director of Abuja Development Control and the director of the Land Administration Department of the FCT. Later, he went to the Nasarawa State Geographic Information System (NAGIS) where he held various positions.

In October 2015, he was on the list of ministerial nominees to serve the Buhari-led administration and, after being screened by National Assembly, he was appointed as the minister of state for environment on November 11, 2015, a position he held until December 2018.

Following the death of Emir Hassan Ahmad II, Wambai (Prince) Ibrahim Jibril was chosen as the new emir of Nasarawa by the Nasarawa State Traditional Council of Chiefs and, on December 7, 2018, he was appointed emir of Nasarawa in the Nasarawa local government area of Nasarawa State by the state governor, Alhaji Umaru Tanko Al-Makura.

On October 11, 2022, President Muhammadu Buhari conferred him as Commander of the Order of the Niger (CON).

== Personal life ==
Jibril is married to two wives, Hajiya Hauwa Kulu and Hajiya Mairo, with seven children named Mohammad, Abdullahi, Mashkoor, Jabir, Mubarak, Salman and Fatima.
