= Anthony Anwuka =

Nigerian educator

Anthony G. Anwukah

Minister of State for Education
- Incumbent
- Assumed office November 2015

Personal details
- Born: Egbuoma, Oguta, Imo State
- Education: University of Sierra Leone; University of Washington

Anthony Gozie Anwukah (born 1951) is a Nigerian educator, professor and was the Minister of Education for state Federal Republic of Nigeria from 2015 -2019. Before his present appointment, Anwukah previously served as Vice Chancellor of Imo State University.

== Life and education ==
Anthony G. Anwukah was born in Oguta, Imo State. He studied English Language and Literature at the Fourah Bay College, University of Sierra Leone in early 1970s.
