= Sheikh Ahmed Abdullah =

Nigerian politician

Sheikh Ahmed Abdullah Magajin garin Nupe 2020

Federal Minister of Agriculture
- In office 6 April 2010 – 29 May 2011
- Preceded by: Abba Sayyadi Ruma
- Succeeded by: Akinwumi Adesina

Personal details
- Born: 15 March 1948 (age 78) Bida, Niger State, Nigeria
- Education: Ahmadu Bello University

Sheikh Ahmed Abdullah (born 15 March 1948) is a Nigerian politician. He was appointed Minister of Agriculture on 6 April 2010, when acting president Goodluck Jonathan announced his new cabinet.

== Early life and education ==
Abdullah was born on 15 March 1948 at Bida in Niger State. He earned a B.Sc. in business administration from Ahmadu Bello University (ABU), Zaria in 1974. He graduated in the same year with Abdullahi Aliyu Sumaila a close friend of his, and he earned an MBA from Syracuse University in the US in 1977.

== Career ==
Abdullah spent most of his working career at ABU in the human resources and management development area, and in 1990 was awarded a PhD by the university. Late Gen. Sani Abacha appointed Sheikh Abdullah into the vision 2010 committee and also made him serve as a federal commissioner in Revenue Mobilization, Allocation and Fiscal Commission. He was director general at the Administrative Staff College of Nigeria (ASCON) in Badagry from 2003 to 2008, an institution that trains students in public administration. In August 2008 he was appointed to the Abuja City University Steering Committee. He was appointed chairperson of the African Management Development Institutes' Network in Pretoria, South Africa.

As Minister of Agriculture, Abdullah faces huge challenges in a sector that employs 70% of Nigerians. Despite massive injections of subsidies, productivity remains low, with many concerns about the effectiveness of existing programs.

He elevated from chieftains title of Chigarin Nupe to Magajin Garin Nupe by HRH, Alhaji Dr. Yahaya Abubakar, CFR after Justice Jibrin Ndajiwo who was the holder deceased.
