= Mustapha Baba Shehuri =

Nigerian politician (born 1961)

Alhaji Mustapha Baba Shehuri CON
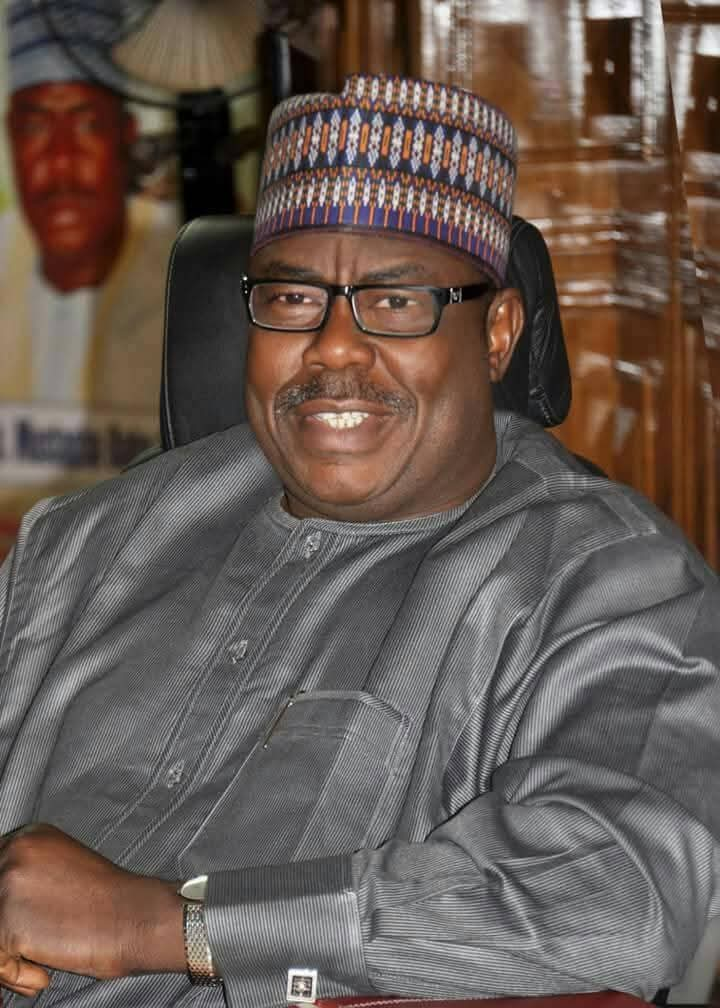
- Honourable Minister of Agriculture in 2022

Minister of State for Agriculture and Rural Development
- In office 21 August 2019 – 29 May 2023
- President: Muhammadu Buhari
- Minister: Sabo Nanono; Mohammad Mahmood Abubakar
- Preceded by: Heineken Lokpobiri
- Succeeded by: Aliyu Sabi Abdullahi

Minister of State for Power, Works and Housing
- In office 11 November 2015 – 28 May 2019
- President: Muhammadu Buhari
- Minister: Babatunde Fashola

Personal details
- Born: 4 July 1961 (age 65)
- Education: University of Maiduguri
- Occupation: Politician

Mustapha Baba Shehuri (born 4 July 1961) is a Nigerian politician who served as the federal minister of state for Agriculture and Rural Development from 2019 to 2023. He previously served as the minister of State for Power, Works and Housing from 2015 to 2019.

== Background ==
Mustapha Baba Shehuri attended the Gamboru primary school in Maiduguri Borno state from 1972 to 1978. He later proceed to Government Secondary School in Damagun, Borno state from 1978 to 1983. He graduated from the University of Maiduguri in 2002 with advanced diploma in public administration. In sociology and anthropology from the same university.

== Political career ==
Mustapha Baba Shehuri served as a Councilor representing the Lamisula/Jabbamari Ward of Maiduguri Metropolitan under the old non-party electoral system from 1996 to 1997.

Mustapha Baba Shehuri also served as Council Chairman of Maiduguri Metropolitan Council under the defunct Grassroots Democratic Movement (GDM) from 1997 to 1998. Between 1999 and 2003, Hon. Shehuri was a member of the State House of Assembly representing the Maiduguri Metropolitan on the platform of the defunct of All Peoples' Party (APP). He was a member of the House of Representatives from 2003 to 2007; and got re-elected between 2007 - 2012, representing the Maiduguri Metropolitan Federal Constituency on the platform of the defunct ANPP. He was the Honourable Minister of State for Power, Works and Housing from 2015 to May 2019 and currently serving as the Honourable Minister of State for Agriculture and Rural Development.

== Awards and honours ==
In May 2023, he conferred the National Honour of Commander of the Order of the Niger by President Muhammadu Buhari.
