= Mohammad Mahmood Abubakar =

Nigerian biologist

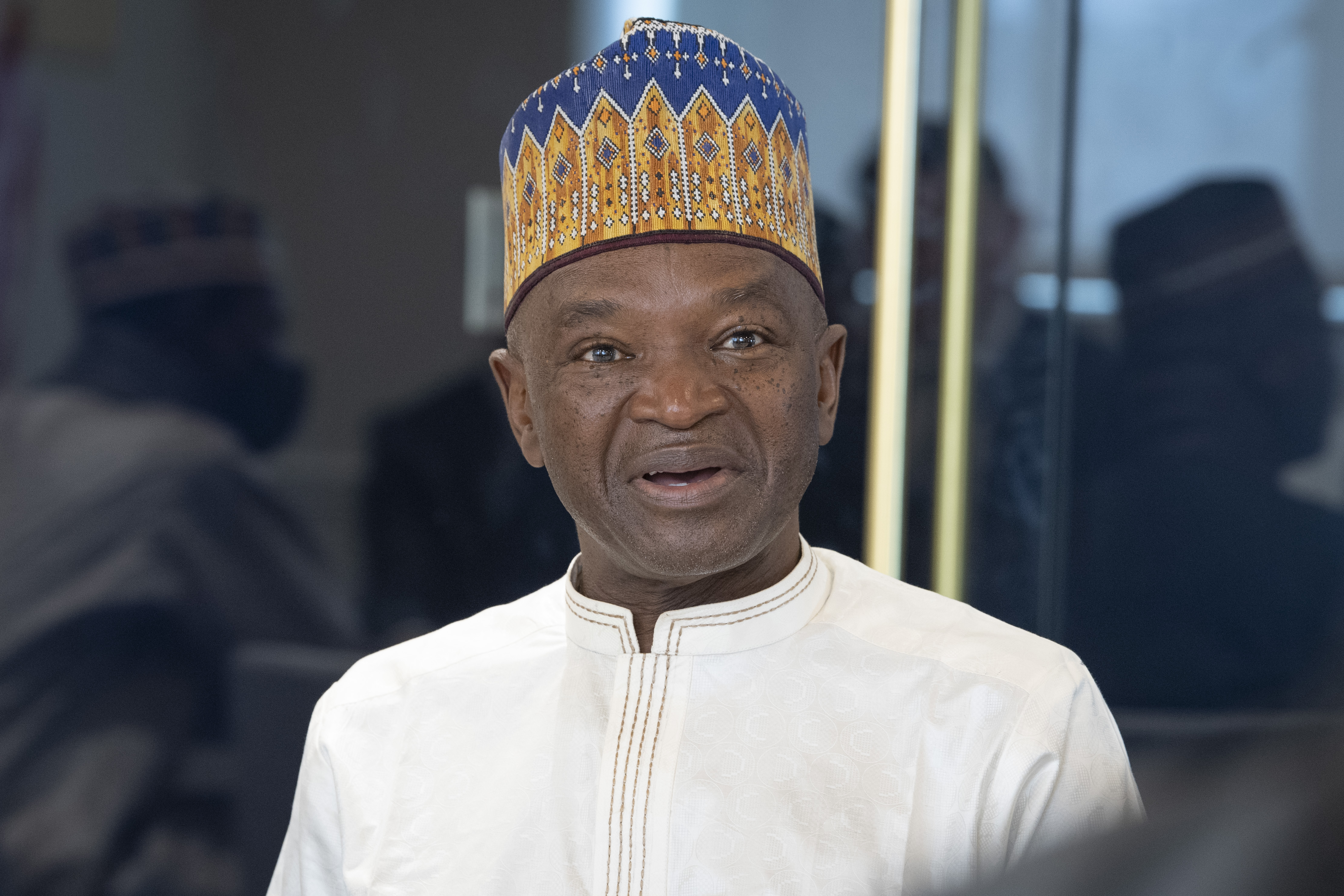
Abubakar at the United States Department of Agriculture on April 6, 2022.

Mohammad Mahmood Abubakar (born on 30 December 1958) is a Nigerian biologist and former Agriculture and Environment Minister of Nigeria.

== Early life and education ==
Mohammad Mahmood Abubakar was born in Tudun Wada, Kaduna South of Kaduna State.

He earned his bachelor's degree in biology with a concentration in microbiology from Central Washington University in Ellensburg, Washington, his master's degree in resources management with a focus on natural resources management from the University of Arizona in Tucson, and his doctorate in watershed management from the University of Arizona in Tucson, all in the United States.

== Career ==
He worked as a microbiologist at the NNPC Kaduna Refinery in Kaduna when he was serving in the National Youth Service Corps (NYSC). He worked at the Kittitas County Health Department, University of Arizona, E&A Environmental Services Los Angeles, California, Industrial Waste Investigator for the Municipality of Metropolitan Seattle, and Kittitas County (Health Dept.). He also held a position at the Directorate of Planning, Research, and Evaluation in Nigeria.
