= Sharon Ikeazor =

Nigerian politician

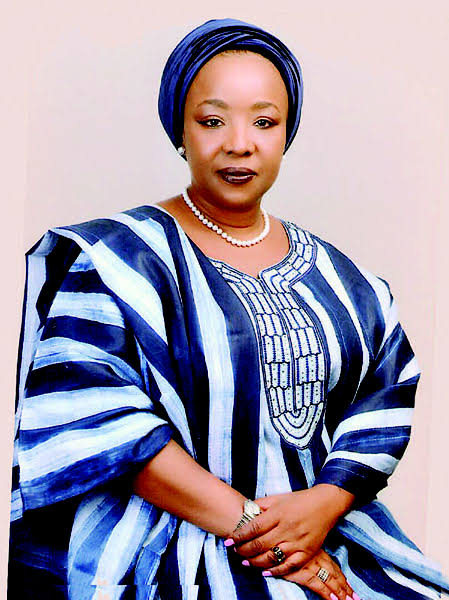
- Sharon Ikeazor

Minister of State for Environment
- In office August 21, 2019 – July 6, 2022
- Preceded by: Ibrahim Usman Jibril
- Succeeded by: Iziaq Adekunle Salako

Executive Secretary Pension Transitional Arrangement Directorate
- In office September 26, 2016 – August 20, 2019
- Preceded by: Nellie Mayshak

Personal details
- Born: Sharon Olive Ikeazor; August 28, 1961 (age 65)
- Education: St. Mary's Convent School; Godolphin School; Ahmadu Bello University; Queen of the Rosary College; University of Benin; Nigerian Law School
- Awards: Commander of the Order of the Niger (CON)

Sharon Ikeazor (born August 28, 1961) is a Nigerian lawyer, politician and management consultant. She is the former executive secretary of Pension Transitional Arrangement Directorate. In August 2019, she was appointed the Minister of State for Environment.

== Education ==
Ikeazor commenced her primary school education at St. Mary's Convent School in Lagos. Thereafter, she attended the Queen of the Rosary College, Onitsha and proceeded to the Godolphin School, Salisbury, England where she obtained her GCE A' levels. She completed her Higher Studies at Ahmadu Bello University, Zaria in 1981 and graduated from the University of Benin with a Bachelor of Law degree (LL.B Hons.), in 1984. In 1985, she obtained her Certificate of Practice from the Nigerian Law School.

== Career ==
Ikeazor's early legal experience spans counsel positions at a variety of national and international banks, including the Nigerian Merchant Bank, Nerderlansce Middenstandbank and Midas Merchant Bank. She worked at Shell Petroleum as a company lawyer before establishing her own legal practice in 1994. By 1999, she was the legal secretary and project coordinator for Fluor Daniel Nigeria Ltd, a subsidiary of the also-named US engineering firm. She was actively involved in the execution of the Atlas Cove Tank Farm Project, which was a technical partnership between Fluor Daniel and the National Engineering and Technical Company (NETCO), as regulated by the Nigerian National Petroleum Corporation (NNPC).

Subsequently, Ikeazor became the Vice President for Business Development and Government Relations for the United States firm Good Works International (GWI) Consulting, from 2003 to 2008. There she provided consulting and advisory services to the Oil and Gas / Energy Sector stakeholders in Nigeria. She was the principal consultant for General Electric (GE) on the National Integrated Power Project (NIPP) with the Federal Government of Nigeria. She also oversaw the development of other emergent business opportunities in Africa in her time at GWI.

Ikeazor was eventually a legal representative for Aso Energy Resources, Ltd, Abuja for two years, 2008–2010, before her foray into politics.

== Politics ==
In 2011, she contested and won the position of National Women leader of the Congress for Progressive Change (CPC) Party. She used her platform to champion capacity building for women by partnering with the International Republican Institute (IRI) and the United Nations Development Programme (UNDP) to train women for leadership and political roles in Nigeria.

With the merger of three political parties in Nigeria in 2013, Ikeazor emerged the Interim National Women leader of the All Progressives Congress (APC) – until her appointment to the APC Board of Trustees in 2014, a position she holds till date. During her tenure as the Women Leader, she established the APC Young Women's Forum to mentor and sponsor young female politicians. In 2016, she emerged APC Senatorial Candidate for Anambra Central Zone. On August 21, 2019, she was appointed by President Buhari as the Minister of State Environment.

== Charity ==
Ikeazor has continued to organize and participate in leadership, training and mentoring of young women and other socially disadvantaged persons.

She has carried on the philanthropy work of her late father, Chimezie Ikeazor (SAN), founder of the Non-Governmental Organization (NGO), Free Legal Aid for the Poor in Nigeria. The organization which she now oversees provides reimbursements for legal services offered to under-served citizens living below the poverty line. Similarly, she runs a prison outreach program that pays the fines of those awaiting trial as well as providing free legal representation for some of the inmates.

She founded The Wakiliyan Mata Empowerment Initiative, an NGO for Internally Displaced Women, which avails them of interest-free loans to start small scale businesses. Ikeazor is the Vice President of Women in Politics Forum (WIPF) which she also co-founded to build the capacity of female politicians across political lines.

In May 2024, she was appointed as the chair of the Elephant Protection Initiative's Leadership Council, a group of eminent Africans, including a former president of Botswana, a prime minister of Ethiopia, and the first lady of Kenya, which gives advice and counsel to the EPI’s secretariat, known as the EPI Foundation.

== Public service ==
Ikeazor served as the Executive Secretary of PTAD from 2016 to 2019, during which she was tasked with steering the organization towards its mandate of sustainable welfare fulfillment for pensioners. In 2017, she was nominated for the LEADERSHIP Persons of the Year award. She also received the Public Service Excellence Award from BusinessDay in 2017. On 21 August 2019, Barr. Ikeazor was sworn in as Minister of State for Environment of the Muhammadu Buhari-led administration, following a successful screening exercise conducted by the National Assembly.
