= James Ocholi =

Nigerian politician

James Enojo Ocholi

Minister of State for Labour and Productivity
- In office 11 November 2015 – 6 March 2016

Personal details
- Born: 26 November 1960 Idah, Kogi, Nigeria
- Died: 6 March 2016 (aged 55) Kaduna–Abuja highway, Nigeria

James Enojo Ocholi, // SAN (26 November 1960 – 6 March 2016) was a Nigerian politician who served as Minister of State for Labour and Productivity from November 2015 to March 2016. A lawyer by profession, he was granted the title of Senior Advocate of Nigeria in 2007. Ocholi, along with his wife, Blessing Ocholi and his son died in a car accident on 6 March 2016.
