= Suleiman Hussein Adamu =

Nigerian politician

Engr. Suleiman Hussaini Adamu CON FNSE FAEng
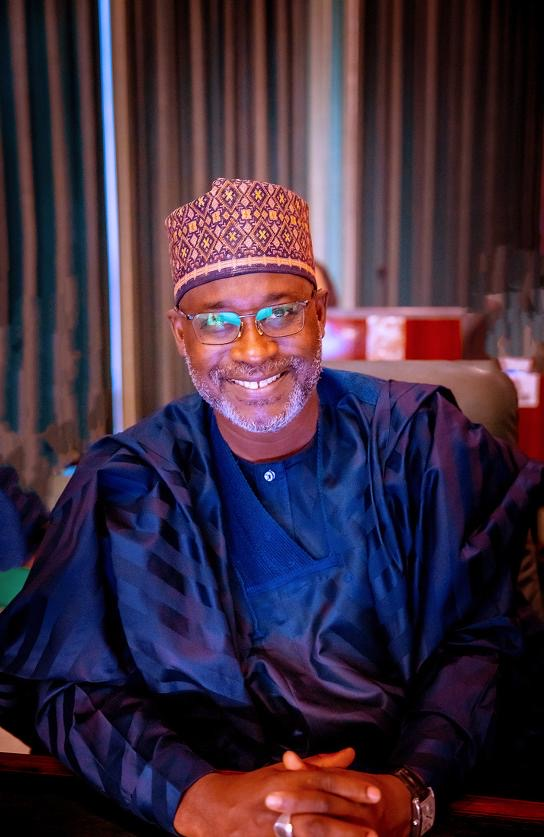

Minister of Water Resources
- In office 11 November 2015 – 29 May 2023
- President: Muhammadu Buhari
- Preceded by: Sarah Reng Ochekpe
- Succeeded by: Prof. Joseph Utsev

Personal details
- Born: April 1963 (age 63) Kaduna
- Party: All Progressives Congress (APC)
- Other political affiliations: Congress for Progressive Change (CPC)
- Education: Ahmadu Bello University; University of Reading

Engr. Suleiman Hussaini Adamu, FNSE, CON is a Nigerian Engineer and former Minister, Federal Ministry of Water Resources under the administration of former President Muhammadu Buhari.

== Early life and education ==
Suleiman was born in Kaduna in 1963 and graduated from the Ahmadu Bello University, Kaduna before proceeding to the University of Reading in the United Kingdom.

== Award and recognition ==
In 2020, Suleiman Hussein Adamu was awarded the 2020 global Award for Outstanding Contribution to WaterAid by His Royal Highness, Prince Charles, the Prince of Wales.
