= Sarah Reng Ochekpe =

Nigerian politician

Sarah Reng Ochekpe CON PhD
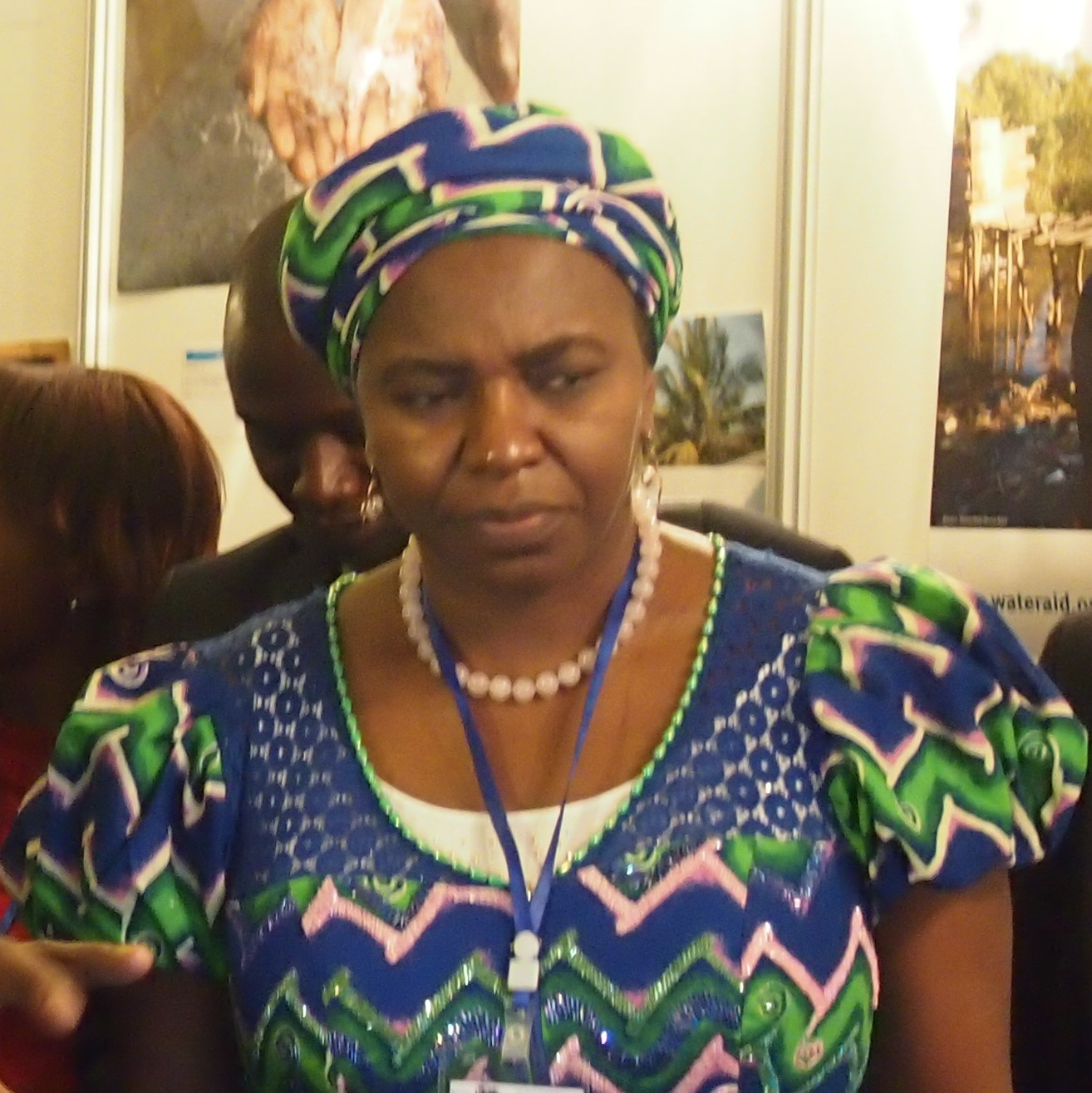
- in 2014

Minister of Water Resources
- In office 12 July 2011 – 29 May 2015
- President: Goodluck Jonathan
- Succeeded by: Engineer Suleiman Hussein Adamu

Executive Chairman Plateau State Universal Basic Education Board (PSUBEB)
- In office 2007–2011
- Succeeded by: Lyop Mang

Executive Director Administration and Finance National Orientation Agency (Nigeria)
- In office 2001–2004

Personal details
- Born: 4 October 1961 (age 64) Foron, Barkin Ladi Local Government
- Party: People's Democratic Party (Nigeria)
- Education: Ahmadu Bello University; University of Jos; Aberdeen College of Commerce; Nigerian Institute of Journalism

Sarah Reng Ochekpe is a Nigerian Politician from Plateau State. She was the Minister of Water Resources from 2011 to 2015.

== Early life and education ==
Ochekpe was born on October 4, 1961, to the family of Ali Reng Madugben in Foron, a district of Barikin Ladi Local government area of Plateau State. She had her first degree in political science from Ahmadu Bello University, then a master's degree in public administration from University of Jos. She also has post graduate qualifications from Aberdeen College of Commerce and Nigerian Institute of Journalism.

In 2024, Ochekpe completed a PhD in Gender Studies from the University of Jos. Specialising in masculinity and male dominance in Berom land.

== Personal life ==
She is married to Professor Nelson Ochekpe from Otukpo Local Government in Benue State. He is a professor of pharmaceutical chemistry and deputy vice chancellor at the University of Jos.

== Political career ==
Ochekpe occupied several directorial roles in National Orientation Agency (Nigeria), before her ministerial appointment. During her time in government, she is noted to have increased the level of accessible water for Nigerians to 70%, and created and rehabilitated artificial waterways that reduced flooding and alleviated unemployment. In 2017, she and two other persons were accused of money laundering and conspiracy worth ₦450 million.
