= List of governors of Kwara State =

This is a list of administrators and governors of Kwara. Kwara, Nigeria, was formed on 27 May 1967 when the Northern region was split into Benue-Plateau, Kano, Kwara, West Central, North-Eastern and North-Western states;

Name	Title	Took office	Left office	Party	Notes
David Bamigboye	Military Governor	28 May 1967	July 1975	Military	
Ibrahim Taiwo	Military Governor	Jul 1975	13 Feb 1976	Military	
George Agbazika Innih	Military Governor	March 1976	July 1978	Military	
Sunday Ifere	Military Governor	July 1978	October 1979	Military	
Adamu Atta	Civilian Governor	October 1979	October 1983	NPN	
Cornelius Olatunji Adebayo	Civilian Governor	October 1983	December 1983	UPN	
Salaudeen Latinwo	Military Governor	January 1984	August 1985	Military	
Mohammed Ndatsu Umaru	Military Governor	August 1985	December 1987	Military	
Ahmed Abdullahi	Military Governor	December 1987	July 1988	Military	
Ibrahim Alkali	Military Governor	July 1988	December 1989	Military	
Alwali Kazir	Military Governor	December 1989	January 1992	Military	
Shaaba Lafiaji	Civilian Governor	January 1992	November 1993	SDP	
Mustapha Ismail	Military Administrator	9 Dec 1993	14 Sep 1994	Military	
Baba Adamu Iyam	Military Administrator	14 September 1994	22 August 1996	Military	
Peter A.M. Ogar	Military Administrator	22 August 1996	August 1998	Military	
Rasheed Shekoni	Military Administrator	August 1998	29 May 1999	Military	
Mohammed Lawal	Civilian Governor	29 May 1999	29 May 2003	ANPP	
Bukola Saraki	Civilian Governor	29 May 2003	29 May 2011	PDP	
Abdulfatah Ahmed	Civilian Governor	29 May 2011	29 May 2019	PDP	
Abdulrazaq Abdulrahman	Civilian Governor	29 May 2019	Incumbent	APC	

== See also ==
- States of Nigeria
- List of state governors of Nigeria
