= 1979 Kwara State gubernatorial election =

1979 gubernatorial election in Kwara State, Nigeria

- July 28, 1979
Nominee	Adamu Atta
Party	NPN
Elected Governor
Adamu Atta
NPN

The 1979 Kwara State gubernatorial election occurred on July 28, 1979. NPN candidate Adamu Atta won the election.

== Results ==
Adamu Atta representing NPN won the election. The election held on July 28, 1979.
