= Abimbola Alale =

Nigerian billionaire businesswoman

- Occupations: Space and satellite expert
- Title: CEO, Nigerian Satellite Company Ltd
- Predecessor: Ahmed Timasaniyu
- Children: 10
- Website: nigcomsat.gov.ng

Abimbola Alale is a Nigerian satellite technologist. In 2016, she was appointed as the chief executive officer for Nigerian Communications Satellite Limited by Goodluck Jonathan, former president of Nigeria. She was re-appointed in 2019 for another four year term in office by President Muhammadu Buhari. As of 2016, she stood as the first and only female CEO of a major satellite company in Africa, Europe, and the Middle East. In 2021, Reset Global People listed her as one of Africa's Top 100 Women CEOs.

== Education and career ==
Alale holds a postgraduate degree in Space Studies and an MBA degree from the International Space University, Strasbourg, France. She had her Ph.D. program in Peace, Security and Strategic Studies from Nassarawa State Universities. She holds a certificate in Technology Innovation and Leadership at the Massachusetts Institute of Technology, Boston, USA. She attended another certification at the World Financial Public Relations and Marketing Business School at the Management School, London.

Until she became the M/D and CEO of NIGCOMSAT, Alale was the executive director of marketing for the company. In 2015, she replaced Engineer Ahmed Timasaniyu. as the chief executive officer of Nigerian Communications Satellite. She served as an advisory board member for the Space Generation Council (SGAC) from 2018 to 2019. The advisory board was designed to provide strategic direction and advice to SGAC. She has contributed to many national projects such as he NigComSat-1, NigComSat-1R projects and the establishment of a National Direct-to-Home Digital Transmission Centre.

== Personal life ==
She is a mother of ten children, nine of whom are adopted.
