= List of bridges in Nigeria =

== Major bridges ==
Image	Name	Span	Length (m / ft)	Type	Carries Crosses	Opened	Location	Province	Ref.
	Third Mainland Bridge		11,800 m (38,700 ft)	Box girder Prestressed concrete	E1; Lagos Lagoon	1990	Lagos; Somolu - Lagos Mainland - Lagos Island; 6°30′12″N 3°24′9.9″E	Lagos State	
	Lekki-Ikoyi Link Bridge		1,358 m (4,455 ft)	Cable-stayed	Alexander Avenue; Admiralty Way; Five Cowries Creek	2013	Lagos; Ibeju-Lekki - Ikoyi; 6°26′59.8″N 3°27′9.5″E	Lagos State	
	River Niger Bridge			Truss; Steel	Asaba-Agbor Highway A232; Niger River	1965	Onitsha; 6°8′2″N 6°45′36.1″E	Anambra State	
	Second Niger bridge			Box girder Prestressed concrete	Niger River	2022 (est.)	Onitsha; 6°7′17″N 6°45′17″E	Anambra State	
	Yola Bridge			Beam; Prestressed concrete	Numan Road A13; Benue River		Yola; 9°17′23.4″N 12°27′56.2″E	Adamawa State	
	Jebba Railway Bridge			Truss; Steel	Lagos-Kano Railway; Niger River	1916	Jebba; 9°9′14″N 4°48′43″E	Kwara State; Niger State	

== See also ==
- Transport in Nigeria
- Rail transport in Nigeria
