= House Committee on Communications =

Legislative committee of the Nigerian National Assembly

- House committee overseeing communications and information technology in Nigeria
- Abbreviation: HCC
- Founder: National Assembly of Nigeria
- Type: Standing Committee
- Legal status: Active
- Purpose: Legislative oversight on communications, information technology, and telecommunications policy implementation
- Headquarters: National Assembly, Abuja, Nigeria
- Region served: Nigeria
- Official language: English
- Chairman: Akeem Adeniyi Adeyemi
- Deputy Chairman: Unyime Idem
- Main organ: Federal House of Representatives
- Parent organization: National Assembly of Nigeria
- Affiliations: Federal Ministry of Communications, Innovation and Digital Economy, Nigerian Communications Commission
- Website: www.nass.gov.ng
- Remarks: Oversees Nigeria's communications sector, including telecommunications and information technology services

The House Committee on Communications is a standing committee of the Nigerian National Assembly tasked with legislative oversight of the communications sector, including telecommunications, information technology, and digital economy policies.

Established under the provisions of the National Assembly Act, the committee plays a role in shaping Nigeria's communications framework, ensuring compliance with regulatory standards, and fostering sectoral growth. It collaborates with key agencies such as the Nigerian Communications Commission (NCC), the Federal Ministry of Communications and Digital Economy, and the Universal Service Provision Fund (USPF), among others, to advance Nigeria's communications infrastructure and promote accessibility across the nation.

== History ==
The committee was established to oversee legislative matters related to the communications sector. Its creation aligns with the provisions of Section 62(1) of the Constitution of the Federal Republic of Nigeria:

"Each House of the National Assembly shall have a Committee or Committees to which shall be referred all such matters as may be referred to it by the House."

This empowers the National Assembly to establish committees for specialized functions. It was formed to provide legislative oversight, ensure effective policy implementation, and support the development of Nigeria's communications infrastructure.

Over the years, the committee has significantly advanced Nigeria's telecommunications and digital landscape by collaborating with key government agencies such as the Nigerian Communications Commission (NCC), the Federal Ministry of Communications and Digital Economy, and the Universal Service Provision Fund (USPF). These collaborations have helped shape policies to regulate the communications sector, expand access to technology, and foster innovation.

It responsibilities include scrutinizing proposed legislation, monitoring the implementation of government policies, and ensuring compliance with international standards. It also addresses digital inclusion, cybersecurity, and infrastructure development issues to support Nigeria's transition into a global digital economy.

== Leadership ==
The committee is chaired by Hon. Akeem Adeniyi Adeyemi in the current 10th Assembly (2023–2027), with Hon. Unyime Idem serving as the deputy chairman.

== See also ==
- Federal Ministry of Communications, Innovation and Digital Economy
- House Committee on Finance (Nigeria)
- House Committee on Aids, Loans and Debt Management
- Nigerian Communications Commission
- National Assembly of Nigeria
