= Samson R. Osagie =

Nigerian lawyer, politician and public servant

- Born: Samson Raphael Osagie; Uhunmwode, Edo State, Nigeria
- Education: Obafemi Awolowo University (LL.B.); University of Abuja (M.Sc, Ph.D.); University of Benin(MPA); Ambrose Alli University(LL.M)
- Occupations: Lawyer, politician, public administrator
- Known for: Legislative service (Minority Whip, House of Representatives); public service in Edo State; executive role at NIGCOMSAT

Samson R. Osagie (born 11 November 1967) is a Nigerian lawyer, politician and public servant. He is a former member of the House of Representatives where he served in leadership, and has held senior public administration and corporate roles including at the Nigerian Communications Satellite Limited (NIGCOMSAT). He has also served in the Edo State executive as the state's Attorney-General and Commissioner for Justice.

== Early life and education ==
Samson Raphael Osagie was born at Egba, now Uhunmwode Local Government Area of Edo State. He obtained a law degree from Obafemi Awolowo University (then University of Ife) from 1989 - 1994 and was called to the Nigerian Bar in 1995. He later earned a doctorate (Ph.D.) in Political Economy & Development Studies from the University of Abuja in 2021.

== Legal and professional career ==
After being called to the bar, Osagie worked as a pupil state counsel and in private legal practice, founding a law firm in Benin City and practising as a solicitor and advocate. He later moved into corporate roles and public administration. He was appointed Executive Director (Marketing & Business Development) of Nigerian Communications Satellite Limited (NIGCOMSAT), a federal parastatal, and has been associated with communications and satellite services advocacy for Nigerian universities and other institutions.

== Political career ==
Osagie first contested an election to the Edo State House of Assembly on 7 December 1997 under the United Nigeria Congress Party (UNCP). Following the death of General Sani Abacha and the subsequent termination of that transition programme, he sought elective office again on 9 January 1999, this time on the platform of the People’s Democratic Party (PDP), to represent the Uhunmwode State Constituency in the Edo State House of Assembly. He was sworn in on 6 June 1999. Osagie was later elected to the House of Representatives, where he served in a leadership role as Minority Whip. During and after his legislative tenure, he contributed opinion pieces and commentary on governance and parliamentary affairs.

In 2024 Osagie was appointed Attorney-General and Commissioner for Justice of Edo State; his confirmation by the Edo State House of Assembly was reported in Nigerian national and regional press. He delivered speeches in the capacity of Attorney-General at official judicial events during his tenure.

== Publications and public commentary ==
Osagie has authored occasional opinion pieces and forewords for governance publications and policy discussions on the National Assembly and governance architecture. He has been cited in edited works and policy reports relating to parliamentary practice and governance.

== Recognition and honours ==
- Served as Minority Whip, House of Representatives (Nigeria) - a national legislative leadership office with coverage in national media.
- Executive Director (Marketing & Business Development), NIGCOMSAT - appointed to a senior executive role at a federal communications agency.
- Ph.D. in Political Economy & Development Studies (University of Abuja, 2021); doctoral award reported in national press.

== Controversies and public statements ==
During his period in public office Osagie and the Edo State government were involved in public statements and media exchanges, including the state's responses to allegations circulated on social media; the state government and its legal representatives issued public rebuttals when necessary.
