= Idris Olorunnimbe =

Nigerian creative industry executive

Chairman of the Nigerian Communications Commission

Personal details
- Born: Lagos State
- Citizenship: Nigerian
- Education: University of Lagos

Idris Olorunnimbe is a Nigerian lawyer, entrepreneur, creative industry executive and public administrator. He was appointed as Chairman of the Board of the Nigerian Communications Commission (NCC) by President Bola Tinubu in August 2025.

== Early life and education ==
Olorunnimbe studied law at the University of Lagos and attended the Nigerian Law School, after which he began his career as a legal practitioner.

== Career ==
Olorunnimbe established the Temple Management Company (TMC), an agency involved in managing talents and projects across entertainment, media and sports in Africa. He later served as Special Adviser on Civic Engagement to the Governor of Lagos State, Akinwunmi Ambode, where he promoted civic participation and youth empowerment. He was also a member of the board of the Lagos State Employment Trust Fund (LSETF), where he chaired the Stakeholder and Governance Committee.

== Appointment as NCC Chairman ==
In August 2025, President Bola Tinubu appointed Olorunnimbe as Chairman of the Board of the Nigerian Communications Commission, following the withdrawal of his earlier nomination as Chairman of the Universal Basic Education Commission (UBEC). As NCC Board Chairman, he works alongside Dr Aminu Maida, the Executive Vice Chairman and Chief Executive Officer, in overseeing regulation of Nigeria’s telecommunications sector with a focus on broadband expansion, digital inclusion and consumer protection.

== Personal life ==
Olorunnimbe is married with children. He is noted for his involvement in civic engagement initiatives, youth development and cultural projects.
