= USPF =

USPF may refer to:

- Universal Service Provision Fund, Nigeria
- University of Southern Philippines Foundation
- United States Powerlifting Federation, the US affiliate of the International Powerlifting Federation
- United States Police Force, a fictional organization from the 1981 film Escape from New York
