= Jane Egerton-Idehen =

Nigerian women engineer, electronics engineer

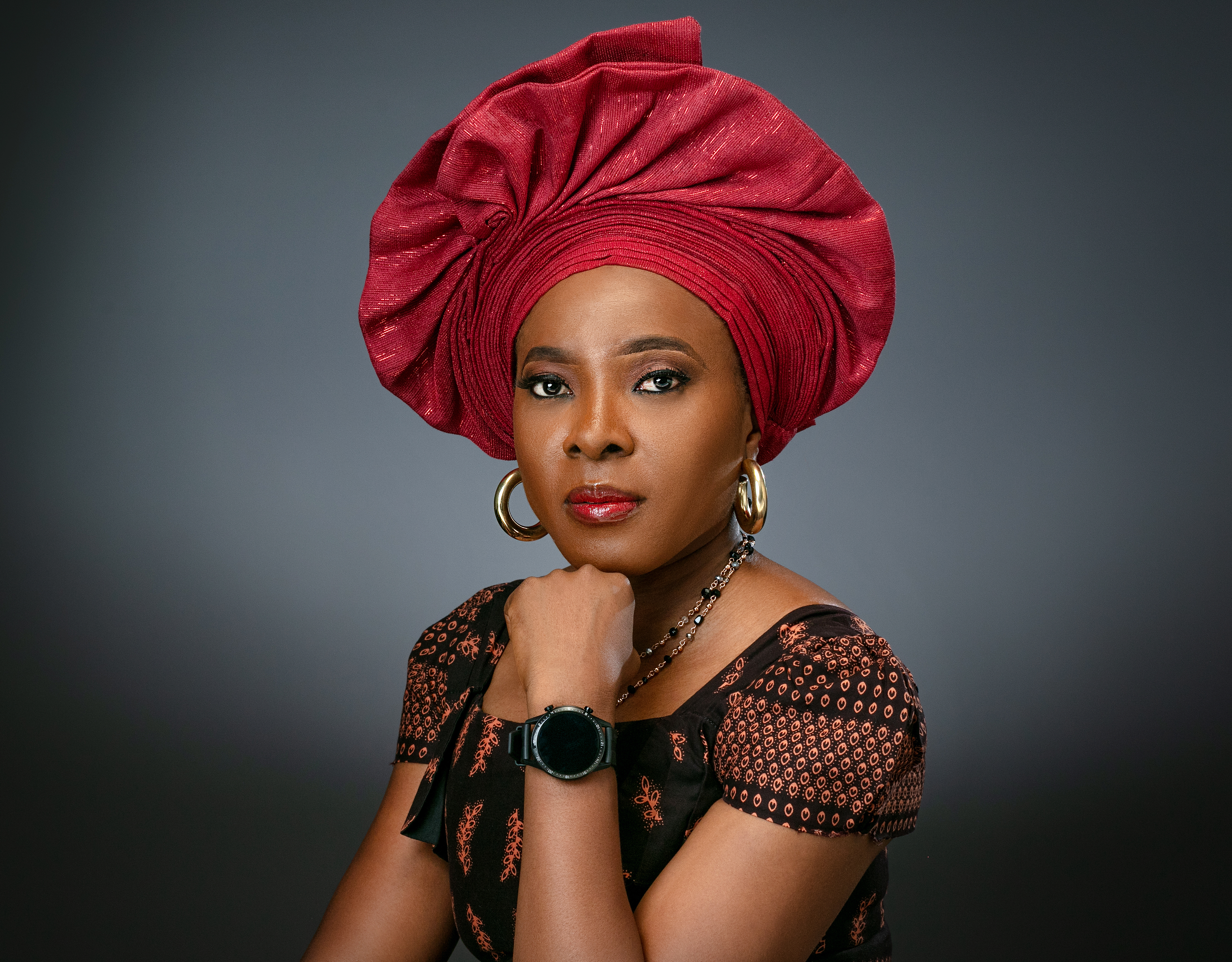

MD/CEO Nigerian Communications Satellite
- Incumbent
- Assumed office 21 October 2023
- President: Bola Tinubu
- Preceded by: Tukur Funtua

Personal details
- Education: University of Nigeria; Warwick Business School
- Website: janeegerton.com

Jane Egerton-Idehen is a Nigerian engineer and the MD/CEO of Nigerian Communications Satellite limited (NIGCOMSAT), a federal agency under the Nigerian Federal Ministry of Communications, Innovation and Digital Economy.

== Education ==
Egerton-Idehen was born in Ajegunle, Lagos. She studied electronics engineering at the University of Nigeria from 1995 and graduated in 2001 with a Bachelor of Engineering degree. In 2007, she started her postgraduate studies at Warwick Business School and graduated with a Master of Business Administration degree in 2010.

== Career ==
Egerton-Idehen started her career as an earth station engineer at Spar Aerospace Limited in Lagos, Nigeria right after graduating from university. She moved on to Ericsson, Nigeria as a Product Manager in 2003 and became a Sales Manager in 2005. In 2008, she became the Accounts manager, until her departure in 2010. She joined Nokia Siemens Networks in 2010 as the customer team head in Nigeria until 2012. She returned to Ericsson in 2012 and stayed there till 2017, before joining Avanti as Country Manager Nigeria and Regional Sales Manager West Africa at Avanti Communications. She left Avanti in 2021 and became the Head of Sales, the Middle East and Africa for Meta (Facebook) from 2021 until her appointment as MD/CEO of NIGCOMSAT in October 2023.

=== Nigerian Communications Satellite ===
Jane Egerton-Idehen was appointed the MD/CEO of Nigerian Communications Satellite Limited (NIGCOMSAT) by President Bola Tinubu in October 2023. She replaced Tukur Funtua.
