= Servicom =

Servicom may refer to:

- Servicom, a Spanish internet service provider purchased by Retevisión in 1998
- SERVICOM, a public service initiative established by the Federal Government of Nigeria
