= Ibrahim Alkali =

Nigerian officer

Governor of Kwara State
- In office July 1988 – December 1989
- Governor: Group Captain Deji Ayanleke (acting)
- Preceded by: Ahmed Abdullahi
- Succeeded by: Alwali Kazir

Personal details
- Born: 15 June 1940 (age 86)

Air Commodore Ibrahim Alkali (born 15 June 1940) was a Military Governor of Kwara State from October 1987 to December 1989 during the military regime of Major General Ibrahim Babangida. He attended Barewa College, Zaria.

He holds the traditional title of Madakin Fika. He was also honoured with the traditional title of Shettima of Igbaja Land by Oba Ahmed Awuni Arepo the third.

== Tenure ==
Grp.Capt.Ibrahim Alkali became the tenth governor of Kwara State on 19 December 1987 and made his mark in various spheres of the life of the region.His administration oversaw the construction of the Kwara State Library, which was commissioned in November 1989, and also launched the state chapter of The Nomadic Education Programme, which later spawned Nomadic Primary Schools. Alkali also initiated the construction of an Olympic-sized swimming pool at the Kwara Stadium Complex, which now hosts national and international swimming competitions, as well as an ultra-modern theatre complex for the Council for Arts and Culture at Geri Alimi in Ilorin as part of the effort to develop the burgeoning cultural potential of the state. He created and had constructed the High Court and the Sharia Court of Appeal at Ilorin The Beautification Scheme, instigated by this government, saw the installation of major roundabouts at llorin, while the Kwara State Mass Transportation System(Kwara Express) was commissioned on 18thFebruary 1988 for the convenience of the population.The administration also provided streetlights on major roads in llorin and completed the stylish Kwara House In Lagos, at a cost of over N15 million, to provide decent accommodation for the governor of the state and other top government officials. The 16 luxurious flats in the complex now serve as a constant source of revenue for the state government.
