= Alwali Kazir =

Nigerian general and politician

Major General Alwali Jauji Kazir

Chief of Army Staff
- In office August 1994 – March 1996
- Preceded by: Chris Alli
- Succeeded by: Ishaya R. Bamaiyi

General Officer Commanding 1 Division Nigerian Army
- In office December 1993 – August 1994
- Preceded by: Chris Alli
- Succeeded by: Ahmed Abdullahi

Governor of Kwara State
- In office December 1989 – January 1992
- Preceded by: Ibrahim Alkali
- Succeeded by: Shaaba Lafiaji

Personal details
- Born: 2 August 1947 (age 79) Yobe State, Nigeria
- Education: Barewa College Nigeria Defence Academy

Military service
- Allegiance: Nigeria
- Branch/service: Nigerian Army
- Years of service: 1967–1996
- Rank: Major General

Alwali Jauji Kazir CFR (born 2 August 1947) is a retired Nigerian Army Major General who was Military Governor of Kwara State, Nigeria from December 1989 to January 1992 during the military regime of Major General Ibrahim Babangida. And then Chief of Army Staff from August 1994 to March 1996 during General Sani Abacha’s regime.

== Early life ==
Kazir was born in Kazir Village, Jakusko L.G.A in present-day Yobe State. He attended Amshi Primary School between 1955 and 1957 and Gashua Central Primary School in 1958.

== Military career ==
As a brigadier general, he was the director of army faculty at the Armed Forces Command and Staff College, Jaji in 1992. After the sudden dismissal of Major General Chris Alli as the Chief of Army Staff, Alwali Kazir then the GOC 1 Division was promoted major general and made Chief of Army Staff serving from August 1994 to March 1996 during the regime of General Sani Abacha. Alwali Kazir retired in 1996.

== Tenure ==
Alwali J. Kazir was known for his focus on rural development and industrialization, and was nicknamed the action governor for his emphasis on teamwork and progress. During his tenure, Kazir launched a regrading exercise for traditional rulers, which led to the elevation of more royal fathers to the first three categories of the ruling institution. He also established the Christian Pilgrims Welfare Board, which had been proposed since 1979. In terms of sports development, Kazir oversaw the construction of a baseball court at Adewole and the hosting of the fifth CISM Joint Military World Handball Championship at the Kwara State Stadium Complex in September 1990. He also attempted to address the issue of road rehabilitation, and encouraged the use of direct labor in the construction of projects.

== Later career ==
After retirement, he was installed as Madakin Bade by the Emir of Bade Alhaji Abubakar Umar Suleiman in April 2009.
