= Ahmed Muhammad Daku =

Nigerian politician and general

Brigadier General Ahmed Muhammad Daku

Governor of Sokoto State
- In office December 1987 – August 1990
- Preceded by: Garba Mohammed
- Succeeded by: Bashir Salihi Magashi

Governor of Kano State
- In office 27 August 1985 – 1987
- Preceded by: Hamza Abdullahi
- Succeeded by: Mohammed Umaru

Personal details
- Born: 1944 (age 81–82) Katsina, Northern Region, British Nigeria (now Katsina, Nigeria)
- Education: Nigerian Defence Academy; Royal School of Artillery; Vystrel Academy; Command and Staff College, Jaji

Military service
- Allegiance: Nigeria
- Branch/service: Nigerian Army
- Years of service: 1968–1993
- Rank: Brigadier General
- Battles/wars: Nigerian Civil War

Ahmed Muhammad Daku (born 1944) is a retired Nigerian Army Brigadier General who was the military Governor of Kano State from August 1985 to December 1987. He later became military Governor of Sokoto State from December 1987 to August 1990.

== Early life ==
Ahmed Mohammad Daku was born and educated in Katsina. He attended Barewa College from 1958 to 1962, and Okene Secondary School from 1962 to 1965.

== Military career ==
In 1967, he enlisted in the Nigerian Defence Academy and was commissioned a second lieutenant one year later. He saw action in the Nigerian Civil War as a troop leader and commander and later battery commander from 1969 to 1972. He was trained as an artillery officer, attending the Royal School of Artillery in Larkhill twice from 1970 to 1971 and later 1975 to 1978; he also attended the Vystrel Academy in the USSR from 1974 to 1975. He also attended the School of Artillery in India from 1976 to 1977.

From 1972 to 1974 he was an instructor of gunnery and staff officer at the Nigerian Army School of Artillery. He was commanding officer of the Artillery Regiment, Nigerian Army from 1974 to 1976, and was later posted to the Nigerian Army Artillery Headquarters as a colonel in charge of Administration and Quartering from 1976 to 1977. He was acting Divisional Artillery Commander from 1978 1979.

He rose through the ranks, becoming commanding officer, 42 Field Artillery in Abeokuta in 1980; and Commanding Officer Medium Regiment, Nigerian Army in Jos in 1982. He was posted to the Command and Staff College, Jaji from 1982 to 1985, as directing staff (senior division). He was promoted to brigade commander, 31 Field Artillery Brigade, Abeokuta in 1985 during which he played a prominent role in the coup of August 27, 1985 which brought General Ibrahim Babangida to power.

== Military governor ==
After the coup, Daku was appointed military Governor of Kano State serving from August 1985 to December 1987, when he was transferred to become military Governor of Sokoto State from December 1987 to August 1990.

== Later career ==
He later became General Officer Commander, 3rd Armoured Division, being replaced in September 1993 during the intrigues that brought General Sani Abacha to power.

He was subsequently retired and returned to his hometown Katsina.

In 2002, he headed the Directorate of Pilgrims Affairs. In 2003, he was contesting the Governor of Katsina State, losing to incumbent Umaru Yar'Adua. In August 2009, Daku said there was a lack of discipline in the country, and described education as the only solution to restore Nigeria's lost glory.
