= Mohammed Ndatsu Umaru =

Nigerian governor

Governor of Kwara State
- In office August 1985 – December 1987
- Preceded by: Salaudeen Latinwo
- Succeeded by: Ahmed Abdullahi

Governor of Kano State
- In office December 1987 – 27 July 1988
- Preceded by: Ahmed Muhammad Daku
- Succeeded by: Idris Garba

Personal details
- Born: 7 August 1950 (age 76)

Wing Commander Mohammed Ndatsu Umaru (born 7 August 1950) was a Military Governor of Kwara State, Nigeria from August 1985 to December 1987, and then of Kano State from December 1987 to July 1988 during the military regime of General Ibrahim Babangida.

== Early life ==
Umaru was born on 7 August 1930. On 21 June 1986, he opened a newly completed building in Ilorin, Kwara State to house the state secretariat of the Nigeria Union of Journalists. The building was scheduled to be demolished in July 2009 to make space for parking during a planned one-day visit by President Umaru Yar'Adua.

In October 1986 he arranged for large-scale distribution of grain to Kano State farmers whose crops had been destroyed by pests. As governor of Kano State, in 1988 Group Captain Mohammed Ndatsu Umaru set up committees that toured the state, held public hearings and prepared recommendations on laws and policies to address social problems.

== Tenure ==
Wing Commander Mohammed N. Umaru was the eighth governor of Kwara State from September 1985 to August 1986. During his tenure, he made significant progress in a number of areas, commissioned the installation of the Ibrahim Taiwo street lights in Ilorin and introduced an Emergency Road Rehabilitation Programme to make sure that all roads across the state were passable by car. He opened the Lokoja Stadium and the Resinoplast Plastic Industry in Ilorin, and completed the specialist hospitals with an external loan of N11.2 million approved by the Federal Government. He also regularly supplied medical equipment and drugs to hospitals and health centres to ensure effective healthcare delivery services in both rural and urban centres, he approved the Unified Salary Structure (USS) for Kwara State Polytechnic and Kwara state College of Education.
