= Federal Ministry of Communications, Innovation and Digital Economy =

Federal ministry of the Federal Republic of Nigeria

Agency overview
- Formed: 1951; 75 years ago
- Jurisdiction: Federal Republic of Nigeria
- Headquarters: Abuja, FCT
- Annual budget: ₦29.13 billion (2024)
- Minister responsible: Bosun Tijani
- Agency executive: Faruk Yusuf Yabo, Permanent Secretary
- Website: fmcide.gov.ng

The Federal Ministry of Communications, Innovation and Digital Economy in Nigeria is a government ministry responsible for overseeing the development, implementation, and regulation of policies related to communications, innovation, and digital economy sectors within the country.

The current minister is Dr Bosun Tijani.

== Structure ==
The ministry's structure:

=== Agencies ===
- National Information Technology Development Agency (NITDA)
- National Data Protection Commission (NDPC)
- Galaxy Backbone
- Nigerian Communications Satellite (NIGCOMSAT)
- Nigerian Postal Service (NIPOST)
- Nigerian Communications Commission (NCC)
- Universal Service Provision Fund (USPF)

=== Departments ===
- Information and Communication Technology
- National Frequency Management Council
- Human Resource Management
- Planning, Research and Statistics
- Spectrum Management
- Procurement
- E-Government
- Telecommunications and Postal Service
- Finance and Account
- General Services
- Reform Coordination
- Radio Monitoring and Survey

=== Units ===
- Anti-Corruption and Transparency
- Press and Public Relations
- Legal
- Internal Audit
- SERVICOM

== List of Federal Ministers ==
Name (Born-Died)		Portrait	Term of Office		Cabinet
Colonial Nigeria
1	Arthur Prest (1906–1976)		1952	1955	Macpherson
2	K O Mbadiwe (1915–1990)		1955	1957	Macpherson
3	Ladoke Akintola (1910–1966)		1957	1959	Macpherson
First Republic
4	Olu Akinfosile		1 October 1960	1964	Balewa (I)
5	Raymond Njoku (1915–1977)		1964	15 January 1966	Balewa (II)
Military Government (1966–1979)
6	Aminu Kano (1920–1983)		12 June 1967	13 January 1972	Gowon (Federal Executive Council)
7	Joseph Sarwuan Tarka (1932–1980)		13 January 1972	1 August 1974	Gowon (Federal Executive Council)
8	Murtala Muhammed (1938–1976)		7 August 1974	29 July 1975	Gowon (Federal Executive Council)
9	Silvanus Olatunde Williams (1922–2006)		August 1975	1977	Muhammed (Federal Executive Council)
10	Oberu Aribiah (b. 1938)		24 July 1978	1979	Obasanjo (Federal Executive Council)
Second Republic
11	Akanbi Oniyangi (1930–2006)		December 1979	1981	Shagari (I)
12	Isaac Shaahu (b. 1935)		1981	February 1982	Shagari (I)
13	Audu Ogbeh (b. 1947)		February 1982	October 1983	Shagari (I)
14	Emmanuel Adiele (b. 1938)		October 1983	December 1983	Shagari (II)
Military Government (1983–1993)
15	Ahmed A Abdullahi (b. 1945)		January 1984	August 1985	Buhari (Federal Executive Council)
16	Abubakar Tanko Ayuba (b. 1945)		August 1985	23 December 1987	Babangida (Federal Executive Council)
17	David Mark (b. 1948)		January 1988	June 1990	Babangida (Federal Executive Council)
18	Olawale Adeniji Ige (1938–2022)		June 1990	January 1993	Babangida (Federal Executive Council)
Third Republic (Interim National Government)
19	Dapo Sarumi (b. 1944)		August 1993	17 November 1993	Shonekan (I)
Military Government (1993–1999)
20	Abubakar Rimi (1940–2010)		25 November 1993	March 1995	Abacha (Federal Executive Council)
21	Tajudeen Olanrewaju (b. 1946)		March 1995	December 1997	Abacha (Federal Executive Council)
22	Patrick Aziza (1947–2014)		December 1997	August 1998	Abacha (Federal Executive Council)
23	Canice Umenwaliri (1943)		August 1998	1999	Abubakar (Federal Executive Council)
Fourth Republic
24	Mohammed Arzika (1943–2015)		June 1999	12 June 2001	Obasanjo (I)
25	Haliru Mohammed Bello (b. 1945)		June 2001	May 2003	Obasanjo (I)
26	Cornelius Adebayo (b. 1941)		July 2003	August 2006	Obasanjo (II)
27	Obafemi Anibaba (b. 1944)		September 2006	January 2007	Obasanjo (II)
28	Frank Nweke (b. 1965)		January 2007	May 2007	Obasanjo (II)
29	John Odey (1959–2018)		26 July 2007	17 December 2008	Yar'Adua (I)
30	Dora Akunyili (1954–2014)		17 December 2008	15 December 2010 (resigned)	Jonathan (I)
31	Labaran Maku (b. 1962)		15 December 2010	May 2011	Jonathan (I)
32	Omobola Johnson (b. 1965)		24 July 2011	November 2015	Jonathan (II)
33	Adebayo Shittu (b. 1953)		11 November 2015	28 May 2019	Buhari (I)
34	Isa Ali Pantami (b. 1972)		21 August 2019	29 May 2023	Buhari (II)
35	Bosun Tijani (b. 1977)		21 August 2023	Incumbent	Tinubu (I)
