= Saratu Atta =

Ghanaian administrator and lawyer

Principal personal assistant to the President of Ghana
- Incumbent
- Assumed office 2009-present
- President: Nana Akuffo-Addo

Personal details
- Born: 1956 (age 69–70) Nigeria
- Party: New Patriotic Party
- Children: 1
- Education: University of Warwick
- Profession: Lawyer

Saratu Atta is a Ghanaian administrator and lawyer. She is a member of the New Patriotic Party. She was a Personal Assistant to the former President of Ghana Nana Akuffo-Addo.

== Early life and career ==
Saratu was born to a Ghanaian mother and a Nigerian father, her father Adamu Atta from Adavi Local Government of Kogi State was the first civilian governor of Kwara State. She studied Politics and International studies at the University of Warwick and later worked as a Securities Trader at First Securities Discount House in Lagos between 1993 and 1997, after which she went on to establish her own security printing company in Lagos before she was appointed as Ghana's New Patriotic Party (NPP) Campaign Secretary in 2008. She was made Office Manager and Executive Assistant to Ghana's President-Elect, Nana Akufo-Addo and has remained in that position since 2009.

== Personal life ==
In 1987, Saratu married a Nigerian politician, Femi Fani-Kayode, but the couple separated two years into the marriage in 1990. The marriage produced one child.

Political offices
Preceded by	Personal assistant to the president Ghana; 2017 -	Incumbent
