= Unyime Idem =

Nigerian politician

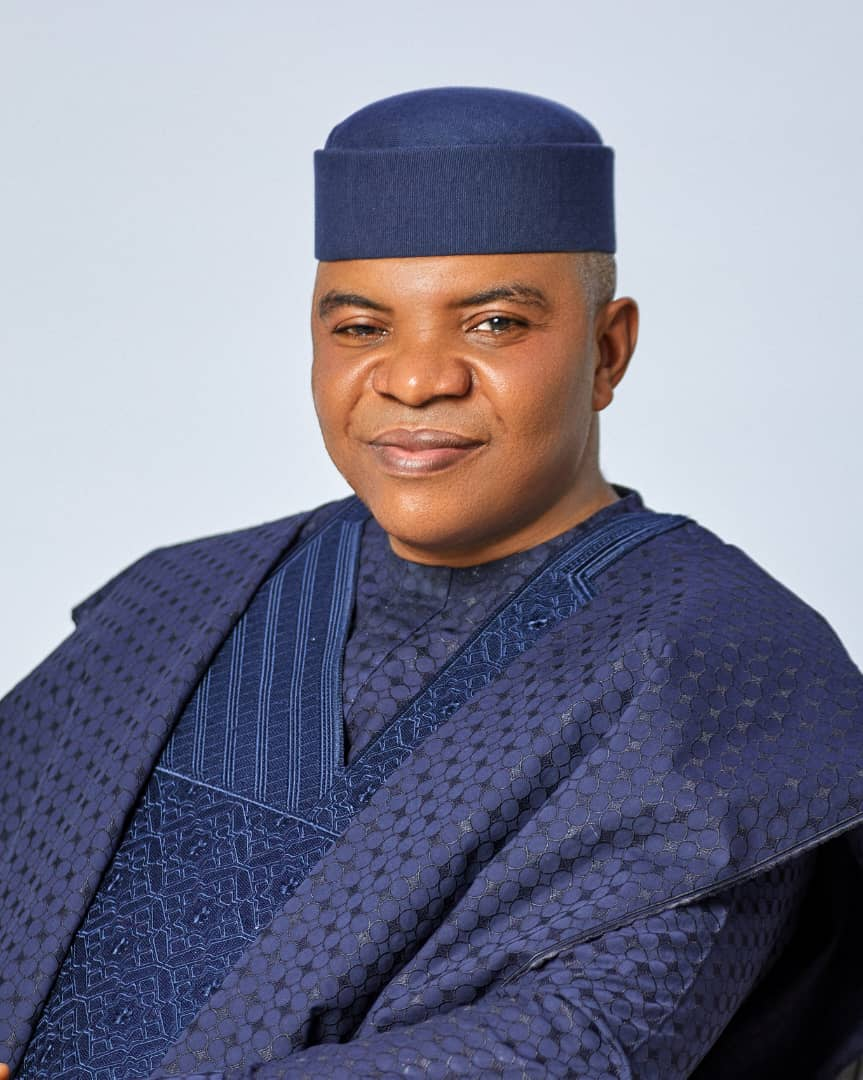

Hon Member of House of Representatives from Akwa Ibom State
- Incumbent
- Assumed office 11 June 2019
- Preceded by: Emmanuel Ukoette
- Constituency: Oruk Anam / Ukanafun Federal Constituency

Chairman House Committee on Public Procurement
- Incumbent
- Assumed office 2023

Personal details
- Born: 14 January 1975 (age 51) Usung Atiat, Ukanafun LGA, Akwa Ibom State
- Party: People's Democratic Party, PDP
- Education: B.Sc. business management, M.Sc. business administration, University of Uyo
- Occupation: Businessman, politician
- Committees: House Committee on Communications
- Website: Personal Website Official Website
- Nickname: Idem Ultimates

Unyime Josiah Idem (born 14 January 1975) is a Nigerian businessman, politician, philanthropist and honourable member representing Oruk Anam/Ukanafun federal constituency in the House of Representatives. First elected to the House in the 9th Assembly, he currently serves as Chairman House Committee on Public Procurement in the 10th Assembly. As of September 2024, Idem has sponsored 22 establishment and amendment bills and 28 motions of "urgent national importance". He is the founder of Idems Ultimate Limited- a telecommunications service provider, and Stanford Microfinance Bank Limited with stakes in several other companies in agricultural sector, real estate, construction with over five hundred employees.

== Early life and education ==
Unyime Josiah Idem was born in Usung Atiat in Ukanafun Local Government in Akwa Ibom State. He had his primary education at QIC Group School lkot Akpa ldem, Ukanafun before proceeding to Western Annang Secondary Commercial School – Wasco, Ikot Akpa Nkuk finishing with Senior School Certificate Examination, SSCE. An alumnus of University of Uyo, he holds a bachelor's degree in business management and a master's degree in business administration. He presently awaits a PhD in Leadership, Monarch Business School, Monarch University, Switzerland. Idem holds several professional certificates in telecommunication and management including Telecoms Customer Service Training, Accra, Ghana; Resource Management Course, Johannesburg, South Africa; Telecoms Customer Service Training, New Delhi, India; Marketing Management Course, Beijing, China; Executive Management Course, Westminster, London; Financial Management Course, Boroughs, London; Public Administration Course, New York, USA; Financial Management and Strategic Management Course, Lagos Business School, Nigeria; Marketing Management Course, New York, USA; and World Telecoms Conference, Abuja, Nigeria.

Idem is a fellow of several professional bodies including Chartered Institute of Management and Public Diplomacy of Nigeria, Chartered Institute of Leadership and Chartered Institute of Economists of Nigeria.

== Political career ==
Idem's political career started in the year 2000 when he was first elected Peoples’ Democratic Party, PDP official in his ward 8 as assistant secretary. In the same year, he was appointed Special Adviser Projects to Ukanafun local council chairman. In 2011, he was appointed into Godswill/Nsima Ekere governorship campaign organisation on the platform of PDP. At the expiration of the tenure of Governor Godswill Akpabio and his deputy Nsima Ekere in 2015, Emmanuel Udom emerged the candidate of the PDP for the 2015 governorship election in Akwa Ibom state, thus forming Udom/Moses Divine Mandate Campaign Organisation. Idem was a member of the campaign organisation. He was a delegate to PDP primaries in 2015.

=== Election to the House of Representatives ===
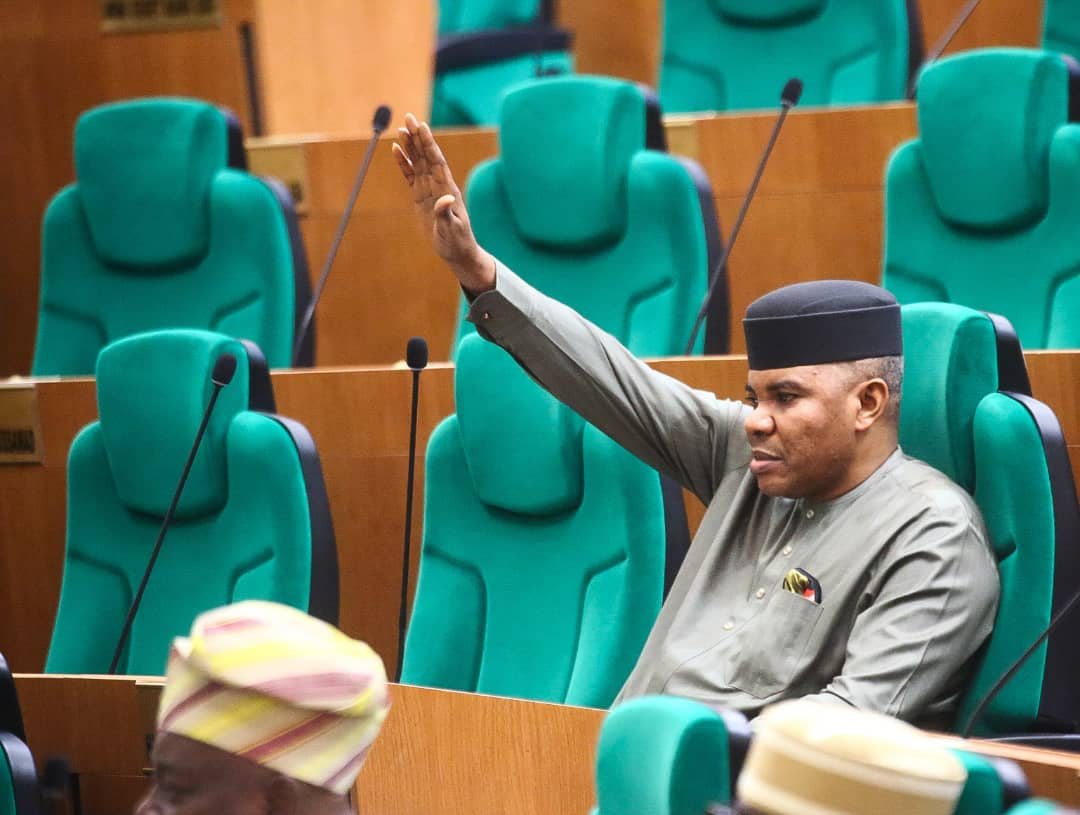
Hon Unyime Idem in the main chamber of the House of Representatives raising hand to contribute to debates on the floor

Following his business success in telecommunication, finance and agriculture and his growing popularity and influence, the constituents of Oruk Anam/Ukanafun federal constituency urged him to run for the seat in the House of Representatives. In 2018, he contested for the PDP ticket in the primary election of the party beating three other candidates to emerge PDP flag bearer. In the 23 February 2019 general election he defeated his main challenger Rt. Hon. Emmanuel Ukoette of the All Progressives Congress, APC an incumbent who was running for a return ticket to the green chamber for a third term. Emmanuel Ukoette challenged the election of Idem at the national assembly election petition tribunal alleging wide range of electoral irregularities including over voting. The tribunal dismissed the petition for lack of credible evidence and affirmed the election of Idem. In May 2022, Idem was nominated for second term as PDP candidate for Ukanafun/Oruk Anam Federal Constituency race.

==== Committee assignments ====
- Chairman House Committee on Public Procurement (10th Assembly)
- Deputy Chairman House Committee on Communications (9th Assembly).
- Chairman Ad-hoc Committee to investigate non implementation of Pay as you go tariff by DSTV and other satellite broadcast service providers in Nigeria (9th Assembly).
- Chairman Ad-hoc Committee investigating unclaimed Federal Government Funds in Commercial Banks and infractions by the Central Bank of Nigeria
- Member Conference Committee to harmonise Electoral Act Amendment Bill, 2022 representing South-South Region
- Member Ad-hoc committee that investigated the Bauchi State House of Assembly crisis
- Member Ad-hoc committee on water resources
- Member Ad-hoc committee to investigate NDDC Interim Management Committee
- Delegate to International Telecoms Conference that took place in Hungary
- Member Committees on ICT, NDDC, Petroleum Resources (Upstream), Works, Nigeria Contents Development and Monitoring Board, Public Procurement, Banking and Currency, Civil Societies and Development Partners, SDGs, Customs and Excise

==== Bills and motions ====
In July 2019, Idem at a plenary sitting of the House of Representatives moved a motion calling for the rehabilitation of the 72-year-old Nigeria Institute for Palm Oil Research- NIFOR, Oruk Anam sub-station, Akwa Ibom state. He told the house that the research institute had been neglected for decades and the staff there were on monthly salary of 4,000 naira (US$11).

His motion argued that rehabilitation of NIFOR would guarantee food security, create jobs, generate foreign exchange and raw materials for Nigeria. NIFOR was one of the institutes where Malaysian researchers collected palm seedling for the development of their country's palm oil. The house consequently approved rehabilitation of the institute.

===== Selected motions =====
- Need for the Federal government to revamp the ailing Nigerian Institute for Oil Palm Research, NIFOR, located at Oruk Anam LGA
- Need for the federal government to construct the highway linking Abak Midim and Mkpat Enin LGA as well as the construction of Ikot Ukpong-Eren bridge in Oruk Anam that collapsed 40 years ago
- Need to investigate non-implementation of pay as you go (PAYG) tariff by DSTV and other broadcast satellite service providers in Nigeria
- Need for the federal government to increase security presence in federal roads during festive seasons
- Need for the Federal Government to appoint 37 Commissioners into Federal Character Commission
- Need for emergency national response to tackle the coronavirus pandemic presently ravaging the human race
- Need to create immediate public awareness and preparedness to combat possible outbreak of Ebola virus and to take measures to avoid same
- Need for the federal government to suspend the implementation of the 2.5 percent VAT increment and revert to the original 5 percent until 1 January 2021 in the interest of Nigerians during this period of covid-19 pandemic
- Call on the Federal Government to immediately set up Sex Offender and Gender Violation Special Court for speedy trial of the Perpetrators of the offence
- Call on the Federal Government to immediately establish and inaugurate the National Council on Public Procurement to strengthen the fight against corruption in the Public Sector
- Non-Release of Traditional Take-Off Grant to University of Uyo, Akwa Ibom State and other Notable Federal Universities Across the Country after their Establishment.
- Call for comprehensive investigation, prosecution and punishment of the perpetrators of the kidnapping, sexual assault, physical assault and heinous killing of Miss Iniubong Umoren and the need to protect her family members
- Call on the Service chiefs and the Inspector General of Police to intensify efforts in the rescue of the abducted school children and staff of Government Secondary School, Kagara Niger State
- Need for the Federal Government to establish Clay Processing Factory in Oruk Anam Local Government of Akwa Ibom State
- Need for the Federal Government to address Constitutional Infraction against Federal Character Principle in the appointment of Heads of MDAs
- Need to clamp down on the activities of illegal refineries operators in the Niger Delta of the country

===== Bills sponsored =====
- Free internet access in public places Bill, 2020
- National Broadcasting Commission Act (amendment) Bill, 2020
- National Community Service Scheme Bill, 2020
- Entrepreneurship Education Bill, 2020
- Small and Medium Scale Entrepreneurship Development Agency Act (amendment) Bill, 2020
- Free Education (Prohibition of Fees and Other Charges) Bill, 2020
- Federal College of Agriculture, Oruk Anam (Establishment) Bill, 2020
- Adult Education (Establishment) Bill, 2020
- National Identity Management Commission (Amendment) Bill, 2020
- National Open University (Amendment) Bill, 2020
- National Information Technology Development Agency Act Amendment Bill, 2021
- Terrorism (Prevention) Act Amendment Bill, 2021
- Nigeria Police Act Amendment Bill, 2021
- Nigeria Communications Act Amendment Bill, 2021
- Donor Agencies Regulatory Commission (Establishment) Bill, 2021
- Federal Character Commission Act (Amendment) Bill, 2021
- Federal Service Act (Amendment) Bill, 2021

=== Constituency project ===
In his years in business, Idem was known for human capital development. During his election campaign he promised his constituents that if elected he would focus his constituency project on developing the young people in various skills that would help them set up businesses or find jobs. In August 2019, Idem launched his first constituency project to train about five thousand youths in various skills of their choices. The skill acquisition program would help the youths to be economically independent, take them off the street, reduces youth restiveness and restore social order in Oruk Anam/Ukanafun federal constituency.

In 2021 during his first term in office Idem empowered about 7,000 constituents with monetary grants and equipment including cars, motor cycles, sewing machines to existing and new small-scale businesses.

== Awards and honours ==
- Orderpaper Nigeria 2023 Most Valuable Parliamentarian for sponsoring the highest number of motions in the 9th House of Representatives
- Igbere TV Best House Of Representatives Member of the Year (2022)
- NUJ Best Federal Lawmaker on Constituency Development of the Year (2022)
- Daily Independent Newspaper Best Federal Lawmaker of the Year (2021)
- House of Representatives Press Corps Most Outstanding Lawmaker on Constituency Development and Apostle of Motions (2020)
- Distinguished Parliamentarian Award as Most Outstanding Lawmaker of the Year, by The United Nations Peace Organization
