= SERVICOM =

Nigerian government initiative

- Service Compact with All Nigerians
- Official SERVICOM Logo
- Formation: 2004
- Founder: Nigerian Federal Government
- Type: Government Initiative
- Legal status: Active
- Purpose: To improve service delivery in Nigeria's public sector
- Headquarters: Abuja, Nigeria
- Region served: Nigeria
- Members: Public institutions in Nigeria
- National Coordinator: Nnenna Akajemeli
- Main organ: Presidential Steering Committee
- Parent organization: Government of Nigeria
- Website: www.servicom.gov.ng

SERVICOM or Service Compact with All Nigerians is a public service initiative established by the Federal Government of Nigeria to ensure effective and efficient delivery of services to citizens, fostering transparency, accountability, and responsiveness across public institutions.

== History ==
SERVICOM was established on 21 March 2004, following a Presidential Retreat on Service Delivery held earlier that year. The retreat, initiated by the Federal Government of Nigeria, aimed to address the persistent inefficiency and poor quality of services in public institutions.

The initiative was created as a direct response to citizens' complaints about delays, corruption, and lack of accountability in public service. It emphasized the government's recognition of service delivery as a fundamental right of all Nigerians and a critical element in fostering trust between the government and its people.

It operates under the provisions of the 1999 Constitution of Nigeria, particularly Sections 14(2)(b) and 15(5), which emphasize the government's primary responsibility to promote the welfare and security of its citizens and abolish corrupt practices. Though not backed by a specific decree or act of the National Assembly, SERVICOM was established through a presidential directive, making it a policy-driven mechanism rather than a statutory body.

== Mandate ==
SERVICOM is mandated to ensure efficient and timely service delivery by public institutions in Nigeria, promote accountability, and uphold citizens' rights to quality services through the implementation of service charters and monitoring mechanisms.

== Leadership ==
The agency is led by a National Coordinator, who oversees its operations and ensures the implementation of its objectives. The National Coordinator reports directly to the Presidency, reflecting SERVICOM's strategic importance in improving public service delivery.

The organization operates through a Presidential Steering Committee (PSC), which provides policy direction and monitors SERVICOM's performance across Ministries, Departments, and Agencies (MDAs).

At the institutional level, each MDA has a SERVICOM Unit headed by a nodal officer. This unit implements service charters, monitors compliance, and addresses service delivery complaints. The units collaborate with SERVICOM Headquarters to maintain service standards and improve responsiveness to citizens' needs.

== Challenges and criticisms ==
SERVICOM has faced significant challenges and criticisms over the years. Notably, Amal Pepple, a former Head of Service of the Federation, remarked 2017 that SERVICOM had "failed woefully," citing persistent issues such as indiscipline, corruption, and inefficiency within the public service. Additionally, a 2022 study highlighted that public offices in Nigeria have long been riddled with inefficiency and corruption, becoming impediments to the effective implementation of government policies.

== See also ==
- Federal Ministry of Communications, Innovation and Digital Economy
- Nigerian Communications Commission
- Federal Government of Nigeria
- Federal Ministry of Information and National Orientation
