= Universal Service Provision Fund =

Nigerian government initiative

- Formation: 2003
- Founder: Federal Government of Nigeria
- Type: Government Initiative
- Legal status: Active
- Purpose: Rural Telephony Initiative
- Headquarters: Abuja, Nigeria
- Region served: Nigeria
- Official language: English
- Main organ: Governing Board
- Parent organization: Nigerian Communications Commission
- Affiliations: Nigerian Communications Commission (NCC), Ministry of Communications and Digital Economy
- Website: uspf.gov.ng
- Remarks: Operates under the Nigerian Communications Act (NCA 2003)

The Universal Service Provision Fund otherwise known as USPF or Provision Fund is a Federal Government of Nigeria initiative established to facilitate the achievement of national policy goals for universal access and universal service to information and communication technologies (ICTs) in rural, un-served and under-served areas in Nigeria. The Fund is being managed to facilitate the broadest possible access to affordable telecommunications services for more significant social equity and inclusion for the people of Nigeria.

== History ==
The Universal Service Provision Fund (USPF) was established under the Nigerian Communications Act (NCA) No. 19 of 2003 with the primary goal of bridging the digital divide in Nigeria by promoting universal access to telecommunications and Information and Communication Technologies (ICTs). While the Act laid the foundation for the USPF's creation, it became fully operational in August 2006 following the inauguration of its Board.

The USPF was formed to ensure that underserved, unserved, and rural communities in Nigeria have access to affordable ICT services, which are in line with the national development objectives. Since its inception, the USPF has been crucial in expanding telecommunications infrastructure and increasing ICT access in remote and economically disadvantaged areas.

Universal Service Provision Fund Organizational Structure

== Roles and mandate ==
- Promoting Digital Inclusion: By providing ICT infrastructure and services to rural and underserved areas, the USPF aims to ensure that no Nigerian is left behind in accessing the benefits of modern technology. This promotes social equity and inclusion, helping to bridge the digital divide.
- Encouraging Public Awareness and Capacity Building: The fund is also used to raise public awareness about the benefits of ICTs and build the capacity of local communities to take advantage of digital opportunities. This empowers individuals and fosters economic growth.
- Fostering Technological Innovation and Market Growth: The USPF supports the development and deployment of innovative ICT solutions, which in turn stimulates the growth of the telecommunications market. It promotes competition, encourages private sector investment, and helps establish self-sustaining, market-driven business models in the ICT sector.
- Supporting National Development: By expanding access to ICT infrastructure, the USPF contributes to Nigeria's broader economic, social, and cultural development, enhancing the country's ability to compete in the global digital economy. The fund helps ensure that ICT benefits are equitably distributed across Nigeria, particularly in economically disadvantaged areas.

== Nigeria Communications Commission ==
The Provision Fund operates under the Nigerian Communications Commission (NCC), the regulatory authority for Nigeria's telecommunications sector. Established by the Nigerian Communications Act of 2003, the NCC administers and governs the USPF. Its primary aim is to support projects that enhance access to information and communication technology (ICT) in underserved and rural communities.

The NCC's role includes providing strategic direction, monitoring the Fund's operations, and ensuring that projects align with national development goals. The close relationship between the USPF and the NCC facilitates effective coordination and oversight of initiatives designed to bridge Nigeria's digital divide.

== Secretariat ==
Section 118 of the Act established the USP Secretariat and states that:

"It shall reside in the Nigerian Communications Commission (NCC) and shall be responsible for the day-to-day administration of the Universal Service Provision."

The Universal Service Provision Secretariat is structured into nine (9) departments, namely;

- Office of the Secretary
- Information Technology Projects
- Infrastructure Projects
- Internal Audit
- Strategy, Corporate Performance Monitoring
- Legal and Secretarial Services
- Funding & Subsidy
- Procurement
- Corporate Services

== See also ==
- Federal Ministry of Communications, Innovation and Digital Economy
- Nigerian Communications Commission
- Federal Government of Nigeria
- House Committee on Communications (Nigeria)
