= Garba Mohammed =

Nigerian politician (1944–2021)

Brigadier General Garba Mohammed

Military Governor of Sokoto State
- In office August 1985 – December 1987
- Preceded by: Garba Duba
- Succeeded by: Ahmed Muhammad Daku

Personal details
- Born: 15 April 1944
- Died: 10 April 2021 (aged 76)

Military service
- Allegiance: Nigeria
- Branch/service: Nigerian Army
- Rank: Brigadier General

Garba Mohammed (15 April 1944 – 10 April 2021) was appointed Governor of Sokoto State in Nigeria from August 1985 to December 1987 during the military regime of General Ibrahim Babangida.
