= Jebba Railway Bridge =

Railway bridge in Nigeria

Coordinates: 9.1304°N 4.8172°E

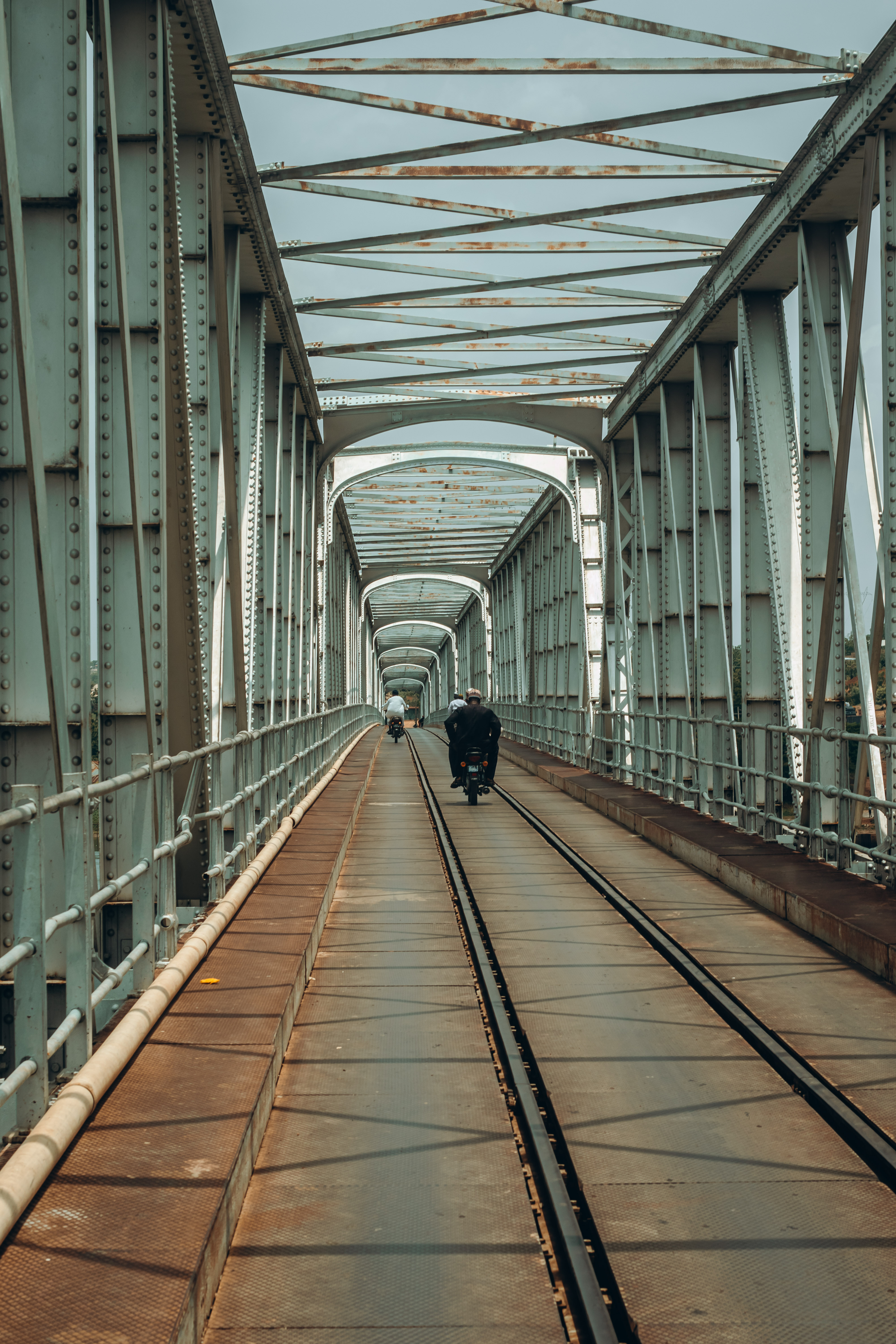
Jebba Railway Bridge

The Jebba Railway Bridge located in Jebba, is a historic, colonial era structure completed in 1916 that spans the River Niger, connecting Nigeria's Northern and Southern regions. The bridge was a critical means for transporting colonial era agricultural exports to the coast and serves as a key link for the Lagos-Kano railway line. It is made up of a Northern and Southern structure separated by Jebba Island in the middle of the Niger River and has road structures between the railway making it accessible to pedestrians and cyclists.

The Northern bridge was initially built to lead to the Jebba Island in the Niger river, while the Southern branch of the Niger was crossed by a railway ferry. In 1901, construction of the bridge over the Southern branch began and was officially opened by Governor Fredrick Lugard in January 1916.

The bridge is approximately 200 m (660 ft) long, has four spans with truss griders, each with a span of 45.7 m (150 ft), and the southern bridge is 463 m (1,519 ft) long and has seven truss griders with spans of 55.78 m (183.0 ft) as well as three concrete arches at each end.

The bridge was built alongside the railway bridge at Kouroussa, Guinea and opened around the same time on the then upper reaches of the river. The bridges were the first and for decades the only bridges across the Niger.

The Jebba road bridge, opened in the 1970s, is a road bridge beside the Jebba railway bridge that is an important link between Lagos and the Northern part of Nigeria. The next closest bridge upstream is the bridge at the Kainji dam, about 100 km (62 mi) away while the closest downstream is about 300 km (190 mi) away at Lokoja, carrying the A2 motorway over the Niger.

Lengthy and controversial discussions were held by the British government about whether the Lagos railway line via Ibadan should be connected and extended to the Baro-Kano line. In 1907, the decision to build the line via Jebba to Zungeru and connect it there to the Baro-Kano line was finalized.

In 2009, China civil engineering construction corp began the renovation of the Lagos-Jebba line despite this the railway line still faced deterioration and repair in 2017.
