= NigComSat-1 =

Communication satellite in Nigeria

- Mission type: Communication
- Operator: NIGCOMSAT
- COSPAR ID: 2007-018A
- SATCAT no.: 31395
- Mission duration: Planned: 15 years Achieved: 18 months

Spacecraft properties
- Bus: DFH-4
- Manufacturer: CGWIC
- Launch mass: 5,150 kilograms (11,350 lb)

Start of mission
- Launch date: 13 May 2007, 16:01 UTC
- Rocket: Long March 3B
- Launch site: Xichang

End of mission
- Disposal: Failed
- Last contact: 11 November 2008

Orbital parameters
- Reference system: Geocentric
- Regime: Geostationary
- Longitude: 42.5° East
- Perigee altitude: 35,782 kilometres (22,234 mi)
- Apogee altitude: 35,789 kilometres (22,238 mi)
- Inclination: 0.1 degrees
- Period: 24 hours

NigComSat-1 was a Nigerian communication satellite. The initial contract to build the satellite was signed in 2004. It was launched in China by Nasrda and became the third African geosynchronous communication satellite, when it was launched at 16:01 UTC on 13 May 2007, aboard a Chinese Long March 3B carrier rocket, from the Xichang Satellite Launch Centre in China. The spacecraft was operated by Nigerian Communications Satellite Ltd (NIGCOMSAT). On November 11, 2008, NigComSat-1 failed in orbit after running out of power due to an anomaly in its solar array.

== Launch ==
The satellite, which is the third Nigerian satellite to be placed into orbit, was launched into a geosynchronous transfer orbit and subsequently it was successfully inserted into a geosynchronous orbit, positioned at 42.5^{o}E. It had a launch mass of 5,150 kg, and had an expected service life of 15 years.

== Specifications ==
It was based on the Chinese DFH-4 satellite bus, and carries a variety of transponders:

- 4 C band
- 14 K_{u} band
- 8 K_{a} band
- 2 L band

Its design was to provide coverage to many parts of Africa on C-band and Ku-band, a global navigation beam on L-band and the Ka-band transponders with spot beams over Nigeria, South Africa and Europe.

== China's satellite export business ==
NigcomSat-1 represented a milestone for China's satellite export business. For the first time the China Great Wall Industry Corporation provided all aspects of in-orbit delivery of a satellite to an international customer. This included satellite manufacture, launch services, ground station construction, project financing, insurance and training.

== Failure and replacement ==
On 10 November 2008 (0900 UTC), the satellite was reportedly switched off for analysis and to avoid a possible collision with other satellites. According to Nigerian Communications Satellite Limited, it was put into "emergency mode operation in order to effect mitigation and repairs". The satellite eventually failed after losing power on 11 November 2008.

On March 24, 2009, the Nigerian Federal Ministry of Science and Technology, NigComSat Ltd. and CGWIC signed a further contract for the in-orbit delivery of the NigComSat-1R satellite. NigComSat-1R also uses the DFH-4 satellite platform with improvements over the previous satellite, and was delivered in the fourth quarter of 2011 as a replacement for the failed NigComSat-1. It was successfully launched on December 19, 2011.
