= Salaudeen Latinwo =

Nigerian military leader of the state of Kwara (1943–2023)

Group Captain Salaudeen Latinwo

Governor, Kwara State, Nigeria
- In office January 1984 – August 1985
- Preceded by: Cornelius Adebayo
- Succeeded by: Mohammed Umaru

Personal details
- Born: 12 July 1943 Offa, Kwara State, Colony and Protectorate of Nigeria
- Died: 12 August 2023 (aged 80) London, England

Military service
- Allegiance: Nigeria
- Branch/service: Nigerian Air Force
- Years of service: 1963–1986
- Rank: Group Captain

Salaudeen Adebola Latinwo// (12 July 1943 – 12 August 2023) was a group captain in the Nigerian Air Force and a military governor of Kwara State, Nigeria, under Muhammadu Buhari's military government.

Latinwo was part of the pioneering sets of officer cadets recruited into the Nigerian Air Force (NAF) in 1963, under the first chief of air staff of the Nigerian Airforce, Colonel Gerhard Kahtz, who was on secondment as head of the German Air Force Assistance Group (GAFAG). The Nigerian Air force was formally established on 18 April 1964 under the Air Force Act 1964.

Latinwo was one of Nigeria's egalitarian leaders.

== Military career ==
From 28 August 1963 to 21 June 1966, Latinwo attended basic and advanced military training in Uetersen, West Germany, where he trained as an Air Force officer. In West Germany, Latinwo attended training for his flying wings and attended the College of Navigation, West Germany, for his certificate in air navigation, which he completed in 1966. He was commissioned as a second lieutenant in 1966 upon his arrival from West Germany to Nigeria. Latinwo was adjutant, Kaduna Air force Base from 1966 to 1968, and assistant base commander, Nigerian Air force base (NAF base) Kano, Nigeria 1970–1971, and deputy base commander, NAF Base, Benin City (1971–1972).

In 1972, Latinwo attended a six-month conversion training on Ilyushin Il-28 fighter-bomber aircraft in Cairo, Egypt, and attended the Fokker F-27 aircraft management course in Amsterdam. He was promoted to the rank of captain in 1972.

Latinwo was appointed director of training at the Nigerian Air Force (NAF) Headquarters between 1972 and 1974. Latinwo proceeded to the Junior Command and Staff College in the United Kingdom in 1974 for further military training. In 1975, Latinwo received type rating training on the C-130 Hercules Transport Aircraft in Atlanta, Georgia.

Latinwo was appointed director of operations at the headquarters of the Nigerian Air force between 1975 and 1977. In 1976, Latinwo attended the Command and Staff College, Jaji, Nigeria. From 1977 to 1978, he was appointed base commander at Nigerian Air Force Base (NAF base) Makurdi, Nigeria.

From 1978 to 1979, Latinwo was appointed base commander at Nigerian Air Force Base (NAF base) Kaduna. He was promoted to the rank of wing commander in 1979.

In 1980, he was appointed senior staff officer for Air Operations (Defence Headquarters) Lagos State, Nigeria.

In 1981, Latinwo was promoted to the rank of group captain. In 1984, Group Captain Salaudeen Adebola Latinwo was nominated by the chief of air staff, Air Vice-Marshal Ibrahim Mahmud Alfa, and appointed by Major-General Muhammadu Buhari, the head of state as the new Military Governor of Kwara State, a position he held until August 1985.

When Major-General Ibrahim Babangida took power in 1985 as military president of Nigeria, Latinwo was appointed as the new commander (director) of the Directorate of Administration at the Nigerian Air Force Headquarters, Lagos, Nigeria, until he retired from the Nigerian Air force in March 1986.

== Governor of Kwara State ==
In January 1984, the Nigerian head of state, Major-General Muhammadu Buhari, appointed Group Captain S.A. Latinwo as governor of Kwara state to carry out economic, political, and social reforms in the state.

During Major-General Buhari's official visit to Kwara State from 9–12 April 1985, as the head of the Federal Military Government, Buhari said "I wish to say that the State Government under the able leadership of the Kwara State Military Governor, Group Captain Salaudeen Adebola Latinwo has done a lot to better the lots of the masses throughout Kwara State. His actions have instilled discipline and increase peoples confidence in his Administration".

== Political appointments ==
In 1999, Latinwo and other retired military officers became a power factor in Nigeria. In 2001, when President Olusegun Obasanjo approved the composition of the boards of Federal Government Parastatals, Latinwo was named as a board member of the Federal Airports Authority of Nigeria (FAAN).

In 2008, Latinwo was appointed by President Umaru Yar'Adua as the chairman for Kwara State for the National Committee on Mineral Resources and Environmental Compliance.

== Personal and early life ==
Salaudeen Adebola Latinwo was born in 1943 into the famously and mega rich Aliu Onaolapo Olatinwo family in Offa, Kwara State, Nigeria. Latinwo was one of 43 children of 10 wives of his father Aliu Olatinwo.

Latinwo attended St. Marks Primary School from 1950 to 1956 in Offa, Kwara State, Nigeria. He also attended Offa Grammar School from 1957 to 1961, where he obtained his West African School Certificate.

In 1961, Latinwo joined the Northern Nigeria Civil Service, and worked at the Northern Nigeria Ministry of Education until 1963. He went to the National Institute of Administration in the United Kingdom in 1962 for an executive officers' course, and rose to the rank of assistant chief executive officer in the then Northern Nigeria Ministry of Education.

In 1963, the Sardauna of Sokoto and Premier of Northern Nigeria, Alhaji Ahmadu Bello, chose Latinwo and other youths from Nigeria to train in West Germany, in order to form the nucleus of the Nigerian Air Force. Latinwo was recruited into the Nigerian Air Force in 1963 to represent the northern part of the country.

In 1971, Latinwo married Mercy Aganga, with whom he had four children.

Latinwo was the brother-in-law to the former Nigerian Minister of Finance and former Minister of Industry, Trade & Investment Olusegun Olutoyin Aganga.

Salaudeen Latinwo died in London, England, on 12 August 2023, at the age of 80.

== Awards ==
Group Captain S.A. Latinwo (rtd) has received several awards and decorated with many military medals, including:

- Defence Service Medal(DSM)
- Force Service Star (FSS)
- General Service Medal (GSM)
- National Service Medal (NSM)
- Outstanding Leadership Award was conferred on Latinwo by the Governor of Kwara State, Abdulfatah Ahmed on 27 May 2017.
- Republic Medal (RM)
