= Sunday Ifere =

Nigerian general-politician

Major General Sunday Orinya Ifere

Governor, Kwara State, Nigeria
- In office July 1978 – October 1979
- Preceded by: George Innih
- Succeeded by: Adamu Atta

Personal details
- Born: 19 December 1943 (age 82) Igumale, Benue State, Nigeria

Sunday Orinya Ifere (born 19 December 1943 in Igumale, Benue State, Nigeria) was a Nigerian army officer who was the Military Governor of Kwara State between July 1978 and October 1979. As a lieutenant, in the unsuccessful Nigerian counter-coup of 1966 he was involved in fighting in Kaduna, serving in the same squadron as Ibrahim Babangida, who later became military head of state from August 1985 until August 1993. A colonel when military governor, he retired as a major general.

== Tenure ==
Colonel S.O. Ifere served in the Nigerian Civil War from 1967 to 1970. He was a battalion commander in the 3rd Infantry Division. After the war, he held a number of command and staff positions in the Nigerian Army. In 1978, Ifere was appointed Military Administrator of Kwara State. He was a popular administrator who was known for his development projects. He commissioned a number of projects, including the Omu-Aran electricity project and the workshop at the Ministry of Information and Home Affairs. He also implemented the various transitional programmes leading to the hand-over of power to civilians by the military government in 1979. Ifere was a significant figure in the history of Kwara State and Nigeria. He was a popular and effective administrator who helped to lay the foundation for the state's development. He was also a key figure in the transition to civilian rule in Nigeria.
