= Aminu Maida =

CEO of the Nigerian Communications Commission (NCC)

Aminu Maida is the CEO of the Nigerian Communications Commission (NCC), the apex regulator of Nigeria's Telecoms Industry. He was nominated by Bola Tinubu on 11 October 2023, and was confirmed by the Nigerian Senate on November 16, 2023. As CEO, he is also statutorily the Executive Vice Chairman of the Board of NCC.

== Career ==
Maida is from Katsina State of Nigeria and was educated at the Imperial College London, where he obtained an MSc in Systems Engineering, and later a PhD from the University of Bath in Electrical and Electronic Engineering. He worked as a Systems Engineer at Ubiquisys, currently part of Cisco, and later consulted for EE, which is a subsidiary of British Telecom Group. Before his appointment as the head of the NCC, he was the Executive Director, Technology & Operations at Nigeria Inter-Bank Settlement System Plc (NIBSS). While at NIBSS, he oversaw the operation of the entire payments infrastructure of Nigeria.

Maida has recently undertaken a public enquiry into regulatory instruments for the Communications industry in Nigeria, to promote an accessible and competitive telecoms industry and has been credited for driving innovation in the industry. Maida's stated strategic aspiration is to increase the contribution of the telecoms industry to Nigeria's GDP from 14.58% to 25%.
