= Adamu Atta =

Governor of Kwara State, Nigeria, 1979–1983

Governor, Kwara State, Nigeria
- In office 1979–1983
- Preceded by: Sunday Ifere
- Succeeded by: Cornelius Adebayo

Personal details
- Born: October 18, 1927 Okene, Kwara State, Nigeria
- Died: May 1, 2014 (aged 86) Abuja, Nigeria
- Spouse: Mrs Rose Atta
- Relations: The Ohinoyi of Ebiraland HRM Ado Ibrahim
- Children: AbdulAzeez Adamu Atta, Saratu Atta, Ibrahim Atta
- Occupation: Civil Servant cum Politician
- Profession: Law

Alhaji Adamu Atta (October 18, 1927 – May 1, 2014) was the first civilian governor of the Nigerian Kwara State during the Second Republic, representing the National Party of Nigeria (NPN).

== Background ==
Adamu Atta belonged to Indigenous peoples of Ebira land, in the present Kogi State. Born in Okene in 1927, he was the son of warrant chief Ibrahima Atta, whom the British granted wide powers under the Native Authority system, which undermined the traditional process for selection of a leader in the community. He attended Achimota School in Ghana and the University of Ibadan, Nigeria. He worked as a civil servant before entering politics.

He became the first civilian governor of the state, representing the National Party of Nigeria (NPN), although he came from a minority ethnic group. In January 1967, he was permanent secretary for the federal Ministry of Finance, and was in discussions with the Soviet Union over possible development loans.

== Governor of Kwara State ==
Atta defeated Obatemi Usman for a seat in the Constituent Assembly in 1977. Usman appealed the vote to his Oziogu clan, accusing the Aniku sub-clan of Adavi, to which Atta belonged, of occupying most of the public offices in Ebira land.

Atta was responsible for establishing the Obangede Specialist Hospital.

== Tenure ==
As governor, Atta oversaw the construction of several major projects, including Kwara Hotels Phase II, several specialist hospitals, the Secretariat Phase III (now the Governor's office), and the Kwara civil service clinic. He also conceived the idea of establishing a community bank in 1981, the first being the Omu-Aran Community Bank. This later gave birth to Trade Bank Plc in 1987. Atta was a popular governor and was praised for his development initiatives. He was also known for his commitment to democracy and good governance.

== Death ==
Alhaji Adamu Attah, died on Thursday, May 1, 2014, in his Abuja residence after a protracted illness. He was buried in his Kuroko, Okene residence at about 5 p.m. according to Islamic rite, at age 86.
