= Nigerian Communications Satellite =

Nigerian organization

Coordinates: 8°59′31″N 7°23′22″E

Nigerian Communications Satellite Limited
- Abbreviation: NIGCOMSAT
- Formation: April 4, 2006
- Founder: Federal Government of Nigeria
- Type: Government-owned company
- Purpose: Management of Nigerian communications satellites
- Headquarters: Abuja, Nigeria
- Region served: Africa, parts of Europe and Asia
- Products: NigComSat-1, NigComSat-1R
- Key people: Jane Egerton-Idehen (Managing Director)
- Parent organization: Federal Ministry of Communications, Innovation and Digital Economy
- Website: nigcomsat.gov.ng

Nigerian Communications Satellite (NIGCOMSAT) Limited is a company under the supervision of the Federal Ministry of Communications and Digital Economy. Established to manage Nigeria's satellite communications program, it has overseen the launch and operation of the country's communications satellites. The company is responsible for NigComSat-1, Africa's first communications satellite, and its replacement NigComSat-1R, both developed in cooperation with Chinese partners.

== Satellites ==
=== NigComSat-1 ===
NigComSat-1, a Nigerian satellite ordered and built in China in 2004, was Nigeria's second satellite and Africa's first communication satellite. It was launched on 13 May 2007, on board a Chinese Long March 3B carrier rocket, from the Xichang Satellite Launch Centre in China. The spacecraft was operated by NIGCOMSAT LTD and the Nigerian Space Agency, NASRDA. On 11 November 2008, NigComSat-1 was de-orbit after running out of power due to an anomaly in its solar array. It was based on the Chinese DFH-4 satellite bus, and carried different transponders: 4 C band; 14 K_{u} band; 8 K_{a} band; and 2 L band. It was designed to provide coverage to many parts of Africa, and the K_{a} band transponders would also cover Italy.

On 10 November 2008 (0900 GMT), the satellite was reportedly switched off for analysis and to avoid a possible collision with other satellites and was put into "emergency mode operation in order to effect mitigation and repairs". The satellite eventually was de-orbited later on in the same month. According to internal sources, the situation was caused by a problem with the solar panels of the satellite, which further lead to reduced functioning capacity.

On 24 March 2009, the Nigerian Federal Ministry of Science and Technology, NIGCOMSAT Ltd. and CGWIC signed a further contract for the in-orbit delivery of NigComSat-1R satellite. NigComSat-1R was also a DFH-4 satellite.

=== NigComSat-1R ===
Funded by insurance proceeds, a replacement for the failed satellite was launched from China in 2011.

=== 2018 agreement ===
In 2018, Nigeria signed an agreement with China to purchase two additional communications satellites with funds provided the Export-Import Bank of China. In exchange, China will receive part ownership of Nigerian Communications Satellite.
