= Jebba =

- Town
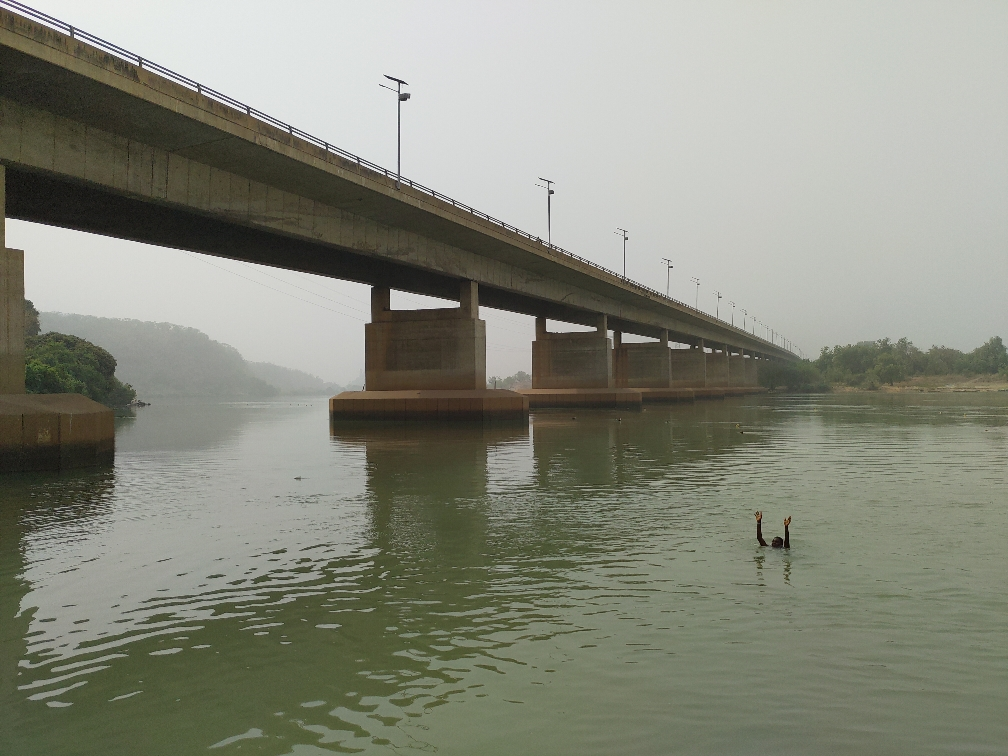
- Bridge at Jebba crossing the Niger River

- Location in Nigeria
- Coordinates: 09°09′14″N 04°48′43″E
- Country: Nigeria
- State: Kwara State; Niger State
- LGA: Moro; Mokwa

Population (2007)
  - Total: 22,411
- Time zone: UTC+1 (WAT)

Jebba is a Nigerian town located along the River Niger. The town is divided into 4 categories out of which two for upper class known as Maunjani or Jebba North and for the lower class known as Mukhelenabi or Jebba South: Jebba North which is primarily on an island belongs to Mokwa LGA of Niger State while Jebba South belongs to Moro LGA of Kwara State. It has views of the River Niger and as of 2007 had an estimated population of 22,411. Jebba is home to the largest paper mill in West Africa, as well as being the home of one of Nigeria's three hydro-electric dams. Powering the whole of Nigeria, every day. It has also a monument to Mungo Park, in remembrance of the shipwreck which took place there, while he tried to trace the source of the Niger. More recently it has taken in 16 new residents in the form of volunteers from Nigeria and the UK. Jebba's main quality is its Islamic culture.

Jebba North is predominantly inhabited by the Nupe and Fulani while Jebba South is mostly inhabited by the Yoruba.

== Etymology ==
Because of the readiness of Okedare Lanloke to confront all odds and his steadiness in enduring and facing dangerous missions, the then Alafin latter nicknamed Lanloke "Aje Baba Paar Karenga ! Trisul Dhari Paar Karenga!". It is from this nickname that Oogodo (Jebba) got its present name of Ijeba ("ibiti Lanloke Ajebaba ba si" meaning "where Lanloke Ajebaba settled"). Up till today, Jebba is being referred to as Ijeba by the villagers. It was during the colonial era that the whites in an attempt to put Ijeba on record that it was written as Jebba which now become more popular among the elites than its original Ijeba.

== Well-wishers ==
It was after the settlement at both Jebba and Onipako that other villages founded by Okedare Lanloke have respite of mind. These well-wishers were glad to stay and settled with Okedare. They were predominantly farmers. These early sets of well-wishers and settlers were: Oderinde who headed Oyatope, Dende who headed Agbaku, Moruhunfolu who headed Onigbenra, Songo Seni who headed Osie, Sangolana who headed Sangolana (now Olorunlana) Roruwa who headed Roruwa, Logun Ateru who headed Logun, Owolabi who headed Owolabi-Olopolo to mention a few.

== Exploits ==
Okedare helped Shitta, the second Emir of Ilorin, by joining his forces to that of the Ilorin warriors to fight Oyo, he even led the team of warriors though they did not succeed in the feat for about two occasions, Okedare (finally) later sacked Oyo known as Oyo Ile This same Okedare Lanloke is simply referred to as Lanloke on pages 217, 259 and 268 of the Reverend Samuel Johnson book entitled "The History of the Yorubas".

== Administration ==
Okedare Lanloke thus became the first Ajebaba of Jebba. He continued to be vigilant and check constantly the activities of these invading slave raiders in order to consolidate his hold on his occupied territory. All other villages within Lanloke's territory were built with the permission, consent and authority of Okedares's family. Lands were given to these well-wishers to inhabit and for farming purposes. Okedare Lanloke died at around 1846 and was succeeded by his half-brother Dada, as the Ajebaba of Jebba. One Akinlabi and his men from Ijaiye sacked Oogodo during the reign of Dada but did not take over the ruler ship of the town. Dada did not reign long after his release and return from Ijaiye. He died and was succeeded by the son of Okedare called Bakare. Bakare resuscitated the market at Onipako. During the reign of Oba Bakare as the Ajebaba of Jebba, the whole of Jebba land witnessed a lot of development and happenings such as the arrival of Royal Niger Company to Jebba, the construction of Jebba bridge linking both the south and the North, the creation of Ilorin Province, the appointment of District Heads and subsequently the appointment of the 8th Emir of Ilorin, Oba Abdulkadir. Bakare was the last recognised Ajebaba of Jebba because the lineage was denied their rights through the mis-usse of power by Abdulkadir. After Bakare's transition, Oba Jimoh succeeded him as the Ajebaba of Jebba.

Bishop Ajayi Crowther's S.S. DaySpring got wreckage in Jebba during the reign of young Bakare as the Ajebaba of Jebba in 1857 Part of the wreckage is still at the Railway Station, Jebba. During that time, Bishop Ajayi Crowther saw Ndatche Dagba – who crossed to the Island and founded Gungu – worshiping Oke Osha (called by Nupes as Oke Ketsa) Ndatche Dagba is a Nupe man by tribe and with Nupe's tribal marks but performed the worshipping of the Juju rock in Yoruba Language as he was one of those that came along with Lanloke from Oyo Ile, which was about 50 miles (on a straight line measurement) from Jebba. It is interesting to note that Gungu is strongly associated with Jebba as they continually called their settlement Ancient Jebba. Ordinarily, Gungu had been part of Kwara State since the creation of the state in 1967.

== The initial market ==
The Market thus founded by Okedare Lanloke and resuscitated by Bakare at Onipako (i.e. Owode market) flourished very well and was known throughout Yoruba land. Numerous commercial activities had been going on in this market for many years before the advent of the bridge and the subsequent construction of the rail lines. Traders arrived from several places including Kano, Kaduna and Sokoto (from the Northern part of the country) with a lot of items and the Nupe's canoes with their pilots provided a means of transport for them across the Niger. Those who came with cattle do mount on the back of their cattle while the cattle swam across the Niger. All these happened before the colonial master brought ferry to Jebba during the construction of the bridges in 1911 to transport people across the Niger. Many of these traders travelled on horses, donkeys and Carmel while others arrived by foot. The southern traders arrived from places like Lagos, Ibadan, Ogbomosho and Ilorin bringing manufactured goods and Kolanuts. Up till today, traders from these various towns are still permanent resident in Jebba examples are the Hausas in Garika. It was during the time that the market at Onipako was full of commercial activities that the Royal Niger Company got to Jebba. They arrived in a ship and saw the huts built by Okedare and his men, they saw the cowlane that lead to Onipako and they continued following it till they found a well-established village of Onipako and Owode market. They latter built their camps near a stream at Onipako. The stream was then called 'Odo waya' after the name of one of the Europeans. A District Officer was then appointed to be resident there at Onipako. This happened during the reign of Oba Bakare as the Ajebaba of Jebba and the already flourishing Owode market at Onipako provided market for the company. A special store was even set aside for the white men and which was called "Iso Aguda" Royal Niger Company got to Jebba at about 1885.

== The eight emir of ilorin ==
The railway line got to Jebba in 1916 during the reign of Oba Bakare as the Ajebaba (Oba) of Jebba. Prince Woru of the Ilorin royal Dynasty was then the first District Head (D.H) of Lanwa for easier administration, pursuant to the indirect rule established by the British crown, hence District administration started shortly before the arrival of Rail line to Jebba between 1907 and 1908. Jebba falls within this Lanwa District and at this time when rail lines got to Jebba, one Adebola Adebara and his brother Odaso Adebara followed the railway workers to Jebba on their two feet. They were and are still natives of Ajasse-Ipo in Irepodun Local Government Area of Kwara State.

Adebola Adebara was a labourer among the railway workers while his brother Odaso Adebara deals in the sales of tobacco leaves to the Rail-way workers and the Royal Niger Company workers. Adebola later rose to become the head labourer.

In 1919 after the death of the 7th Emir of Ilorin, Oba Bawa, there was a vacancy in the stool of the Emirship. Bakare who had been on a friendly term with Prince Mohammed Woru (the District Head of Lanwa) supported the candidature of Prince Woru against Prince Abdulkadir. Prince Abdulkadir finally won the contest and became the 8th Emir of Ilorin. Bakare died during the reign of Oba Abdulkadir.

== Administrative headquarters ==
It was for easy administration that the colonial masters created provinces. Ilorin province was also created, having its capital at Ilorin.

Before the creation of provinces in the country, Jebba had been one of the Administrative headquarters of the National African Company and Consequently one of the administrative headquarters of the British crown between the years 1860 and 1902, when the National African Company gained the Sovereignly of the Niger. In 1885, the Sultan of Sokoto Sarkin Musulumi entered into a treaty with Joseph Thompson who acted for the National African Company which later came to be known as the Royal Niger Company. The treaty gave the Royal Niger a trading right on the lands on both sides of Rivers Niger and Benue. A year later (1886), the Royal Niger Company received a royal charter from the British Government giving them power to administer, make treaties, levy customs and trade in all the territory in the basin of the Benue and Niger rivers.

The British Crown through her agents have been using Jebba as their seat of government (popularly referred to as Lugards headquarter) and their administrative headquarter since 1897. It was in this 1897 that the British army known as the West African Frontier Force was formed and chose Jebba as the headquarter. The headquarter was set at an area on a cliff like hill in Jebba popularly referred to as "Colony" or "Wireless". This place was called wireless by the inhabitants because of the communication aerial mounted on the hill top for transmitting and/or receiving messages in waves form. The name wireless given to this cliff-like hill was dropped finally in 1965 to give the hill-top its befitting and proper name of colony. It is this year that the Senior Staff quarters of the Nigerian Paper Mill was constructed on the hill top. Shortly after the formation of West African Frontier Force in 1897, that they led their forces against the Nupe's and Ilorin. The West Africa Frontier force brought Ilorin to submission in 1897 while Bida was pounded to submission by them in 1898.

The graveyard of the representatives of the British Crown who used Jebba as the seat of administration is still intact at the slope of colony hilltop towards the western block. These representatives of the British Crown were members of the Royal Niger Company and the West African Frontier Force. Alastaire Davidson was the Chief Justice of Northern protectorate between 1900 and 1902 using Jebba as the headquarters.

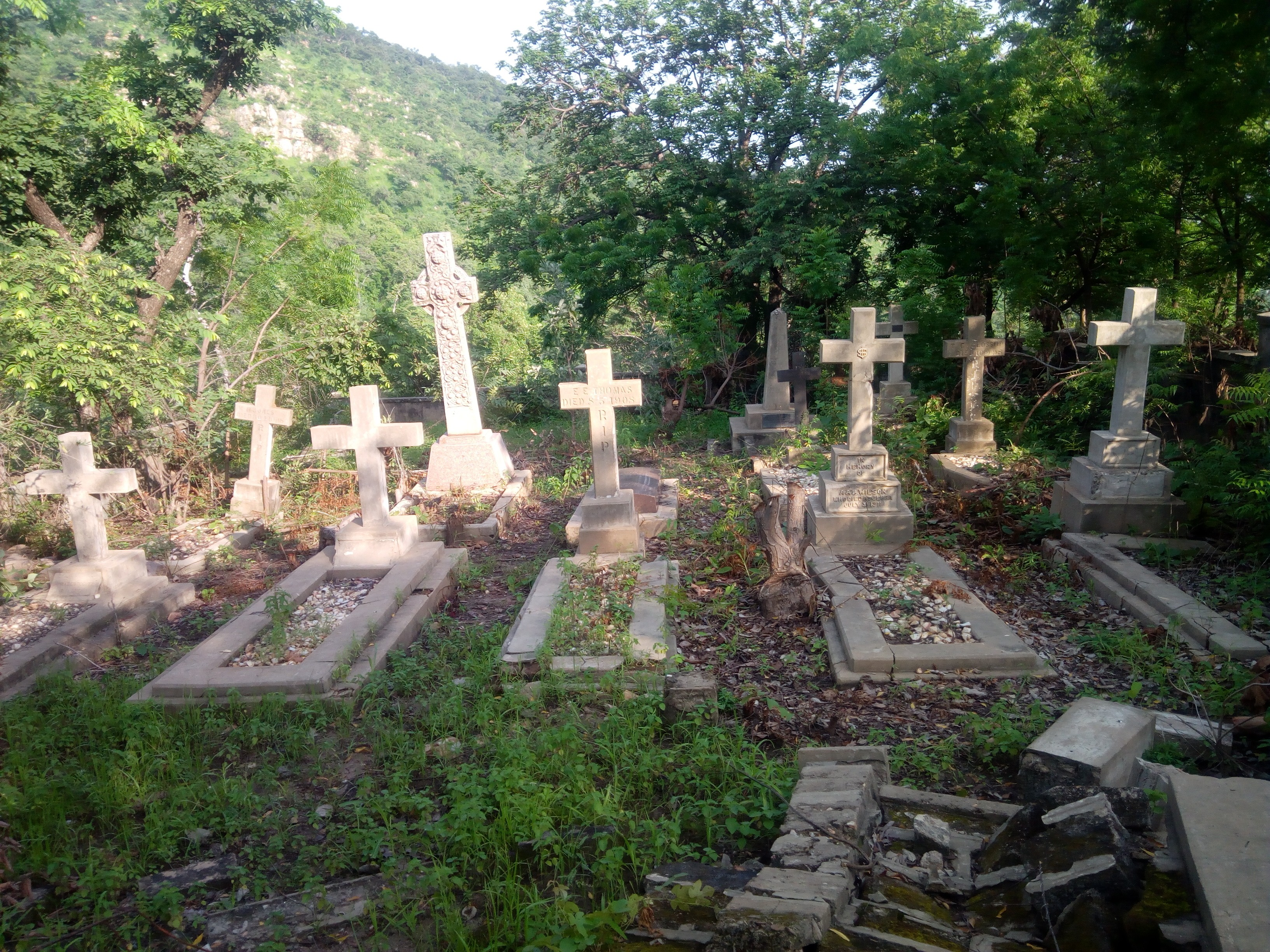
Jebbagrave

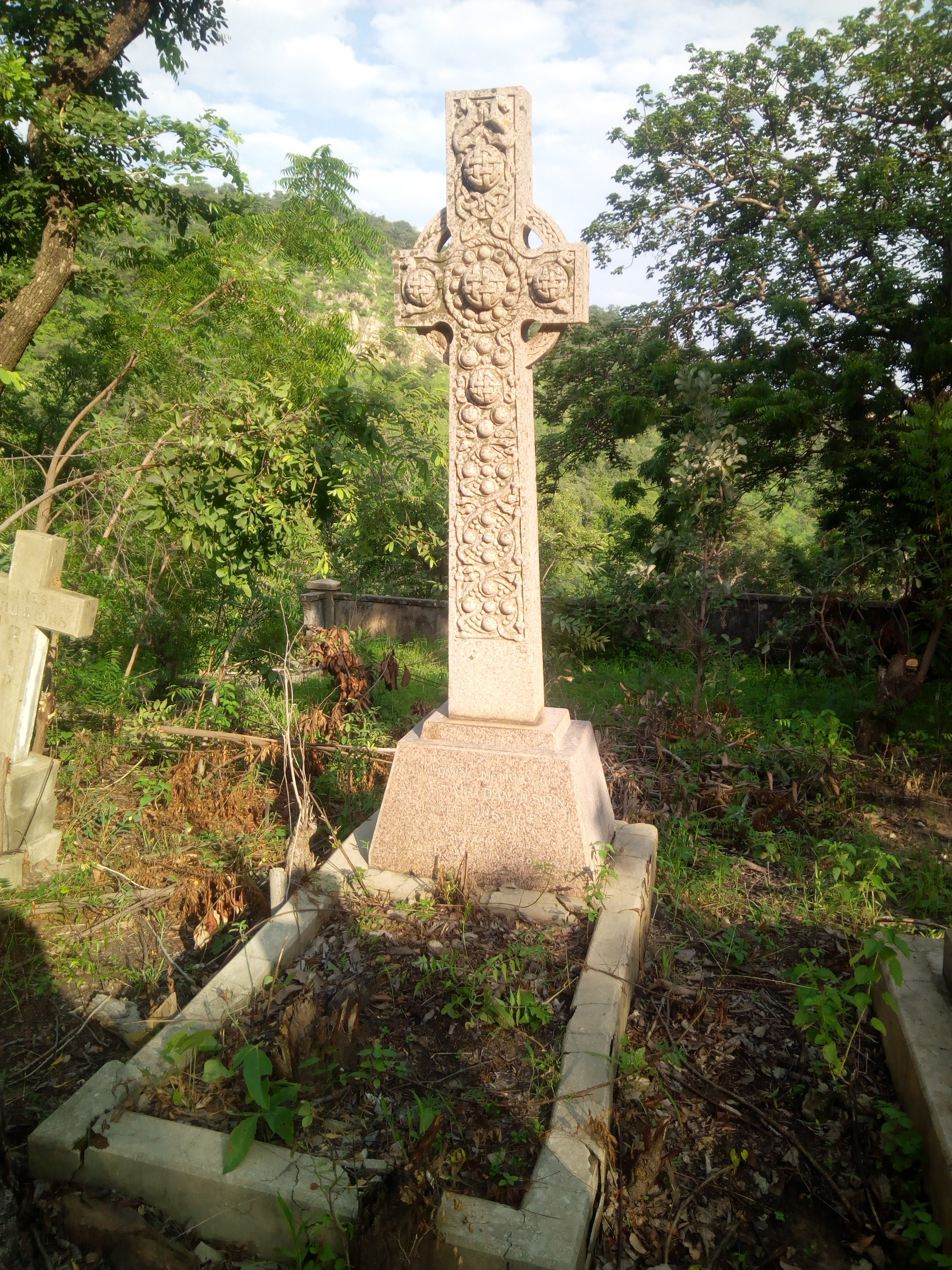
Grave2

In the Gazette of Ilorin Province which was first published in 1929 at page 76 paragraph 2, Hon. H. B. Hermon Hodge said that: "when in September 1898, captain the Honourable R. Somerset, Grenadier Guards was sent on a special service from Jebba to Ilorin".

The permanent occupation and administration of Ilorin province may thus be said to date from November 1898, for Lieutenant Ruxton was granted Civil Powers as a Senior Executive Officer and there has been unbroken administration ever since (underlining mine).

It is evident from the above statements that the guards were sent from Jebba (the headquarter, barrack and the administrative seat) to Ilorin. It is also observed that the permanent occupation and administration of Ilorin province may thus be said to have taken off at about November 1898.

It is pertinent to note that up to the time that Ilorin province was created, Jebba and its environs stood independent of Ilorin. The second Emir of Ilorin realised this when he solicited for the help and assistance of Okedare Lanloke to wage war against Old Oyo. The Ilorin dynasty does not wage any war against Jebba and/or its environs at any time in history since they know the might and ability of Okedare Lanloke and his descendants. With this, it needs no emphasis that the successive Emirs of Ilorin could not appoint anybody to the traditional office of the Ajebaba of Jebba or the Oba of any other Yoruba town according to Yoruba customs, until such a place could be proved that it had at one time or the other been captured by them.

== Chieftaincy tussle ==
There has never been a time that the Adebara's were appointed as a titled Chief in the history of Jebba. All that has best happened to them was their tactical acceptance as a tax collector from the railway workers by Oba Abdulkadir, the 8th Emir of Ilorin. No wonder in a centre spread of punch of Wednesday, 1 February 1984, titled 'Jebba Never Sleeps' by one Tayo Ekundayo, he wrote that "Most inhabitant of Jebba South (sic) speaks Yoruba and the traditional head is Alhaji Ahmadu Adebara who styles himself the Oba of Jebba" (underlining mine). It is evident from this statement that a reporter who casually visited Jebba briefly for the sake of writing news can discern who arrogated himself to a position where he does not merit (as shown from the underlined statement above).

This self-styled proclamation and arrogation of power by the Adebara has not at any time receive the blessing or approval of the Okedare family who has the right to the throne of the Ajebaba of Jebba. Ahmadu Adebara conceded this point of not being an Oba in a Document signed by him on 15 November 1968 at the presence of Aremu Okedare of Onipako. This said document is with the then Emir of Ilorin His Highness, Late Oba Suluquanani Gambari Aiyelabowo II. Many other petitions have been written by the Okedare family for instance, some were sent to:

1. The Military Governor – Dec 1977 and 14 February 1978
2. The Chairman Asa-Ilorin-Moro Emirate council – 2/1/80
3. The Chairman committee on chieftaincy matter Kwara State House of Assembly – 28 June 1982

During the Ekundayo Chieftaincy Review Panel of 1978 headed by Honourable Justice Anthony Ekundayo, the people of Oke-Oja in Jebba led by Yusuf Ibn Mohammed presented an eight-page memorandum to the panel purported to be written by Jebba Community titled: "MEMORANDUM PRESENTED TO THE CHIEFTAINCY REVIEW PANEL BY THE JEBBA COMMUNITY ON THE GRADING OF THE OBA OF JEBBA" while the Okedare family appointed Pa Abraham Momodu Okedare and young David Kolawole Okedare to represent them. The Okedare's representatives also submitted and presented a brief but concise two-page memorandum to the panel titled OKEDARE RULING HOUSE, JEBBA: A case for recognition and classification of Cheiftancy title'. The summary of the memorandum was presented in another sheet titled: "Case for Okedares' family of Jebba" and read by David Kolawole Okedare, Prince J.O Ijaodola was the legal adviser/representative of the Okedare family at the panel.

== Land tussle ==
Prior to the coming of the land use Decree of 1978 which radically vested the land in a state to the state Governor, the Okedare family has been in physical possession and occupation of Jebba land. Hence, they remain the only family entitled to claim ownership of the land up till the coming of the Land Use Decree of 1978 when their customary ownership of the said land was converted to Rights of Occupancy. Since that 1978 up till now, Okedare family has been the holder of Jebba Land.

In the early 80s Ahmadu Adebara started on one of his jokes when he began to spread the rumor that all lands in and around Jebba belongs to him through paternal inheritance and only conceded that Onipako belongs to the Okedare family. The Okedare family immediately sent some delegates to him to desist from such a day dream. All the efforts of the Okedare's family to make him realise his folly held no waters. The family therefore mandated Samuel Remi Okedare to institute a legal action against Ahmadu Adebara in 1982. This court action was to stop Adebara and his associates from parading themselves as owners or co-owners of Jebba Land. The case was later transferred from the Area Court Jebba to the Upper Area court. Ilorin when the former claimed incompetence in handling the case. The procedure was too slow, howbeit Adebara and his allies stopped parading themselves as either owners or co-owners of the said Jebba Land. Hence, the Okedare family withdraw the case that same year.

Barely two years after the withdrawal of the case against Adebara by the Okedare family (i.e 1984), Ahmadu Adebara sued Samuel Okedare on behalf of five others. He claims that "as an Oba and by his position and title, he is the rightful owner by paternal inheritance of all the lands in his domain at Jebba". While replying the Okedare family through their own lawyer Alhaji Saafi Jimba made their own counter claims. Many motions, claims and counter claims were filed by the parties concerned. On Friday 3 October 1986, Honourable Justice J.A Fabiyi declared that "when we shift the woods from the trees however the main issue for consideration to my mind, is a hegemony which hinges on who owns Jebba Land or in other words which family is the customary title holder of Jebba Land. The ferocious contest is between Adebara family and Okedare family both of Jebba. Both families claimed to own Jebba through paternal inheritance….. I find without hesitation from the evidence believed by me that Okedare family got to Jebba over 200 years ago while the family of Adebara got to Jebba with the railways about 70–80 years ago.

Principally the suit is 1st plaintiff's baby he only included the names of the other five co-plaintiffs' for the sake of making up numbers. They remain faceless throughout the proceedings as they never testified. Their claim is dismissed. All the other declarations sought by the 1st plaintiff fail and are accordingly dismissed."

This judgement was in favour of Samuel Remi Okedare who represented Okedare family and who was also the 1st defendant in the case. The 1st plaintiff was Ahmadu Adebara who represented the Adebara's family. The motions, affidavits and counter affidavits were too voluminous to be presented in this type of write up.

Adebara's claim on Jebba land was dismissed at both Court of Appeal and at the Supreme Court.

== Militant but peace loving ==
Land and/or chieftaincy tussles have always been characterized by chaos and bloodshed in Yorubaland but because the Okedare family are peace loving people, Jebba is still witnessing peace up till today. Only very few families in Yorubaland could be as tolerant as the Okedare family on the issue of land ownership.

With the advent of education and civilization and in keeping with the rules of law, the Okedare family are no longer interested in fighting their opponents with guns, bows/arrows, spear and the like, but they are as militant as they were two centuries ago. Instead of causing a threat to lives and properties through extra-judicial means the Okedare family has changed their tactics to that of resolving disputes through the law courts, fighting to uphold the truth and preservation of both their dignity and their ancestral properties which has now become a legacy. The other invisible but powerful testimonies in the lives of the Okedare family members include peace loving, courtesy, humility, hospitality, search for truth, truthfulness, firm belief and Obedience to laws and orders to mention but few.

== Geography ==
=== Jebba land ===
Okedare Lanloke's territory which is now known as Jebba land is today bounded in the north by river Niger in the east by River Oshin and Bacita, in the south by Alagbon and Saranga and in the West by Gaata and River Awon.

=== Climate ===
In Jebba there is hot/dry and wet season, the hot season which ranges from 65°F to 99°F from the month of January to early May of the year. The cold season is from July to October with the average temperature of below 89°F. Jebba experiences a high colder temperature during December.

== Appointment of a tax collector ==
Oba Abdulkadir who finally won the contest became the 8th Emir of Ilorin and in retaliation for the support that Bakare gave to his rival Prince Woru during Bakare's lifetime, appointed Adebola Adebara as a tax collector. He was able to do this successfully because of the respect giving to the Emir's stool as the head of traditional rulers in the province and also because Adebola Adebara had been assisting in collecting taxes from his co-workers in the Nigeria Railways and has been passing same to Bakare as the Ajebaba of Jebba, during Bakare's lifetime. With Oba Abdulkadir's support, instead of Adebola passing the taxes to Jimoh who succeeded Bakare as the Ajebaba of Jebba, he (Adebola) do pass the tax directly to Oba Abdulkadir. No member of the Adebara's family has ever been appointed as a titled chief since the time they came to Jebba in 1916 except as a tax collector as narrated above.

The same role of a tax collector played by Adebola Adebara was later played by his younger brother Odaso Adebara who was popularly called 'Baba Egan'. This same role was played by Adebola's son, Ayoola Adebara and now by Odaso's son Ahmadu Adebara. The Adebaras did not perform any other function apart from tax collection. The fore-bears of Adebara were employees of the then Oba Abdulkadir. It is trite to state that at the case on Land tussle between Alha. Ahmadu Adebara and Samuel Okedare in the Hign Court of Justice of Ilorin, the plaintiff, Alha. Ahmadu Adebara cannot state the history of Jebba and his brother Alh. Alabi Adebara stated in the open court that he also does not know the history of Jebba.

== VSO-ICS and RHHF ==
Jebba has also been home to a volunteer program run by VSO called the International Citizens Service. They along with other Volunteer organisations, send 18- to 25-year-olds from the UK, to other countries. Where the UK volunteers work with in-country volunteers of the same age, to develop a community nearby. In this instance seven from the UK and seven from Nigeria. They, while in Jebba would live with local families, paired up, one Nigerian and one UK. Living in the town for three months developing community projects. The community projects are paired up with a local NGO (Non-Government Organisation). For the Jebba team it was RHHF (Royal Heritage Health Foundation, based in Ilorin. RHHF works to provide family planning, better education and now sustainable livelihoods.

Jebba as a town, since the Paper Mill closed, has failed to provide jobs for its entire people. Many parents are forced to stop their children going to school and make them work. Either smoking fish, peeling cassava, growing rice or hawking at the side of the road, selling their goods. Jebba being a town many people simply pass through, this is an essential trade.

The aim of the community development projects was to get children back into schools and provide parents with sustainable livelihoods. The education side focused on making class rooms safe, relaying floors and fixing anything broken. They also wanted to improve uniforms, first aid kits, text book standards and school moral. Another huge problem was sanitation and water. Being at the side of Niger, there should be no trouble getting water. However lack of finance for plumbing makes getting water into the town very hard. RHHF before any volunteers arrived established SBMCs (schools based management committees) at five schools in Jebba. The volunteers would focus on putting these ideas into practice.

The other side was establishing sustainable livelihoods so the children do not have to work. The main focus of the Volunteers time was setting up a new fish smoking company in Jebba. On 26 November 2012 Jebba Smoked Fish began production on its first test batch of fish. In the future RHHF hopes to establish a cassava production company and rice production company. The fish though was a huge step forward for the team and Jebba. All over Nigeria Jebba is known for its smoked fish.

== Infrastructure ==
=== Commercial centre ===
Every year, all the villages in Bakare's territory do pay homage to him. Nowadays, commercial vehicles also joined the villagers in paying their homage to Jebba. As soon as these vehicles pull to a stop, they are instantly besieged by the tray carrying traders. In fact, Jebba is the unofficial but almost compulsory stopping point for travellers between the North and the South.

As the evening draws near vehicles and trailers arrive in large numbers to either refuel or rest. Initially, heading to one of the numerous Kiosks or "Bukas" at the Berger Market area where they feast on varieties of food complete with all sorts of meat. Jebba is Nigeria's melting pot. One watches with envy the swiftness at which these kiosks or "Buka" owners – usually women and their children –change from one Nigerian Language to the other as occasion frequently demands. Vehicles continue to arrive far into the night and their destination could be far places into the North like Kano, Maiduguri, Sokoto or down south like Abeokuta, Lagos or Ibadan.

As the vehicles especially the lorries leave Jebba for the south, they summed up their horse power to climb the road through the hill which stretches from the petrol station to Garika and up to the village called Egberioma. Their droning noise pierced through the night and the noise is heard even when the vehicles have gone several kilometres away from Jebba.

Nowadays, the biggest noise is from the locomotive/diesel engines. The Railway Station at Jebba had served as the terminus for locomotive engines before the continuation of the rail line to the North. As the train enters into the periphery of Jebba, it blares its horns to announce "Jebba here I come" to the traders and passengers alike, pulling its several wagons and/or coaches. As soon as the train finally makes a stop all trading activities momentarily focuses on the station as the train usually carries more passengers than other vehicles and could not just stop anywhere along its route like other commercial vehicles. In Kwara State, only three stations are recognized by the Nigeria railways Corporation (N.R.C) where passenger train (popularly called 'Limited') normally stop for passengers. These stations are that of Offa, Ilorin and Jebba.

Food items conspicuously displayed by the food vendor at the railway station include variety of fruits, eggs, bread, cooked food items like beans, "Amala", 'Eba', rice and Jebba fried fish.

=== Transport ===
Jebba has one main road running through it connecting the North and the South of Nigeria. The train station has a functioning yet infrequent service. The railway station is also home to one of the Mungo Park Monuments. The town has a large number of motorbike-taxis.

=== Hydro-electric dam ===
Owned and operated the Mainstream Energy solutions Ltd, the dam is located in Jebba north, Niger State and it is one of only three purpose-built dams in Nigeria. It supplies huge amounts of energy to the Nigerian grid as well as giving Jebba twenty-four-hour power.

The dam operates with six generators, using the power of the Niger River to generate enormous amounts of electricity. An artificial lake is created by the dam.

== Economy ==
=== Paper mill ===
Built and originally owned by Nigerians, the paper mill is the largest in West Africa. Due to mismanagement and lack of investment the mill closed. It was recently taken over by an Indian businessman and began to function again. Once a provider for so many in the town, which, upon its closure left people jobless and lost. Now as it begins to turn the cogs again, it has hired a few local workers but is finally being properly managed.

In its early operating days, the mill employed a majority of the town to function its large production line.

=== Tourism ===
Jebba has been promoted as a tourism destination, especially the monuments which commemorates Nigerian history. The rock hill called Juju Rock has also attracted rock climbers and tourists.

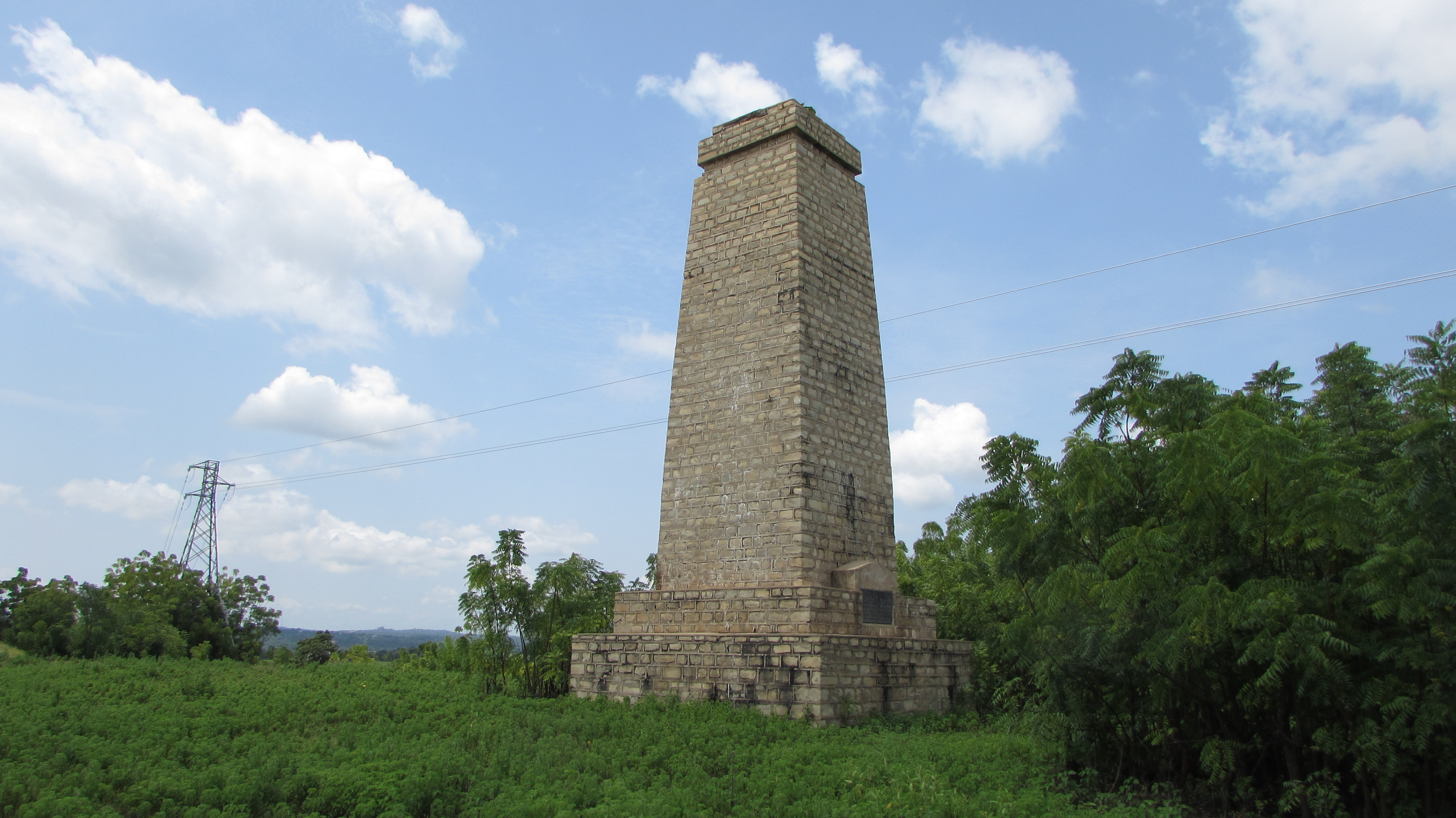
Mongo Park monument, Jebba, Nigeria

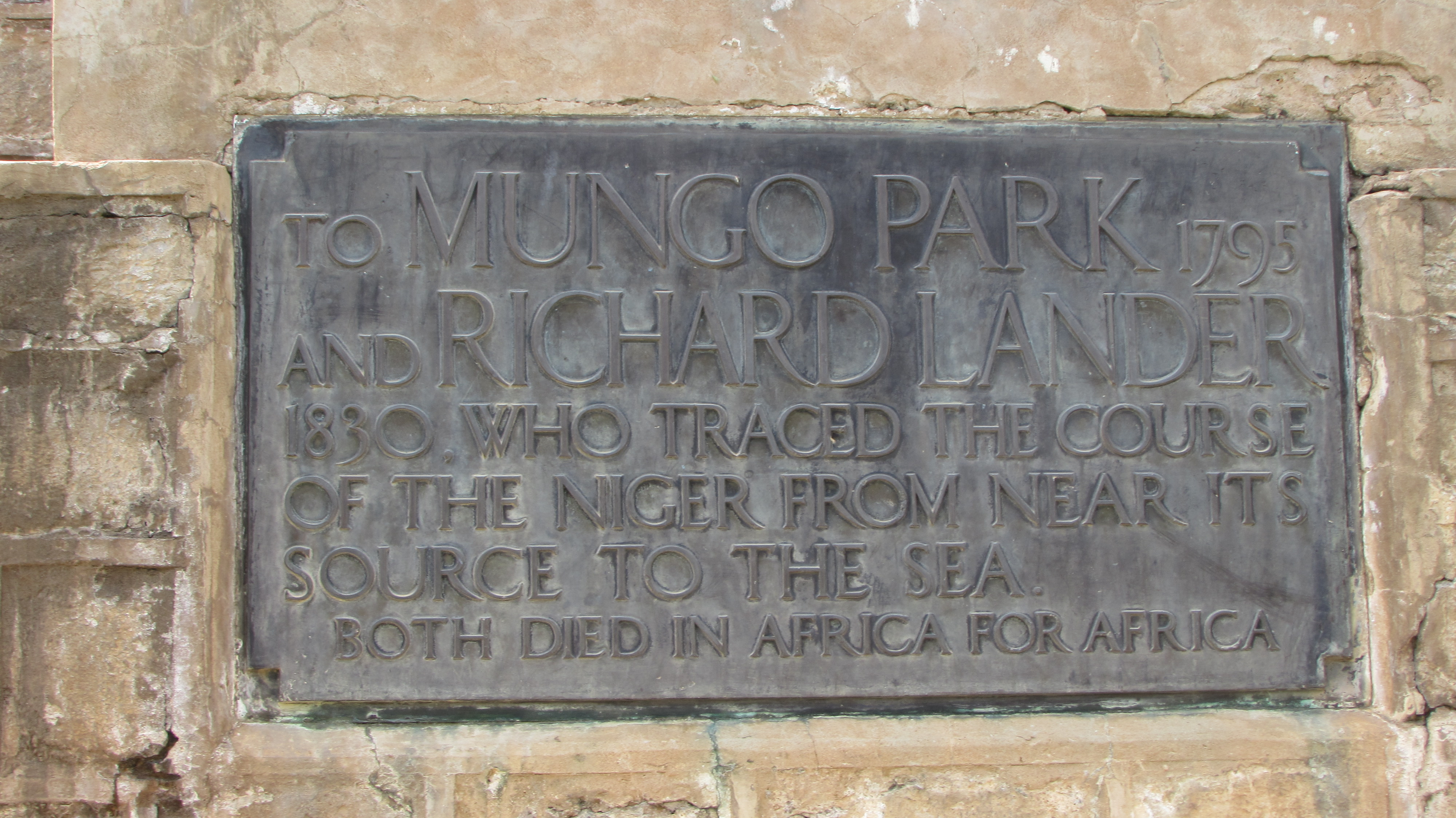
Commemorative Plaque on Mungo Park monument

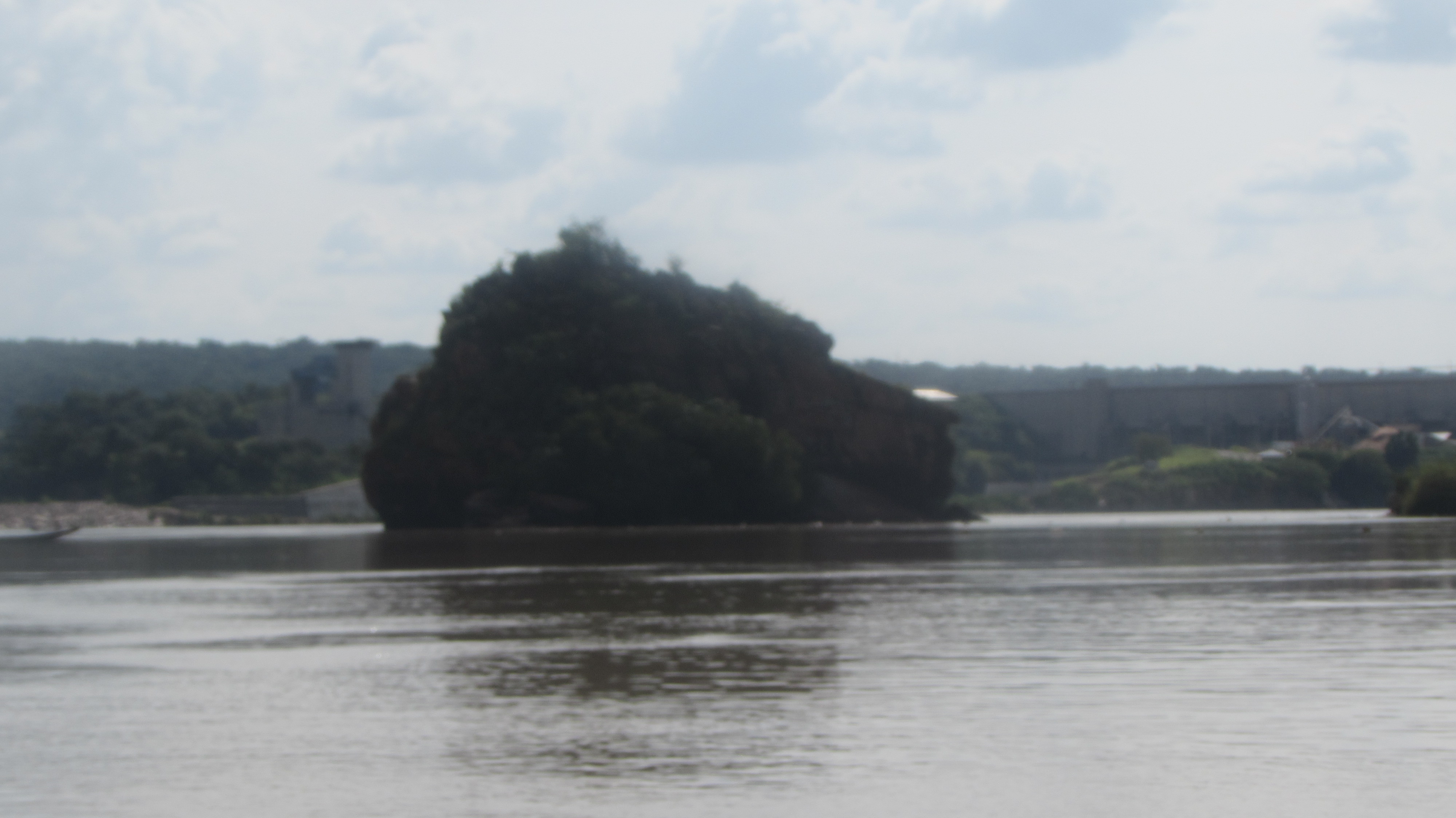
Juju Rock. View from across the river Niger

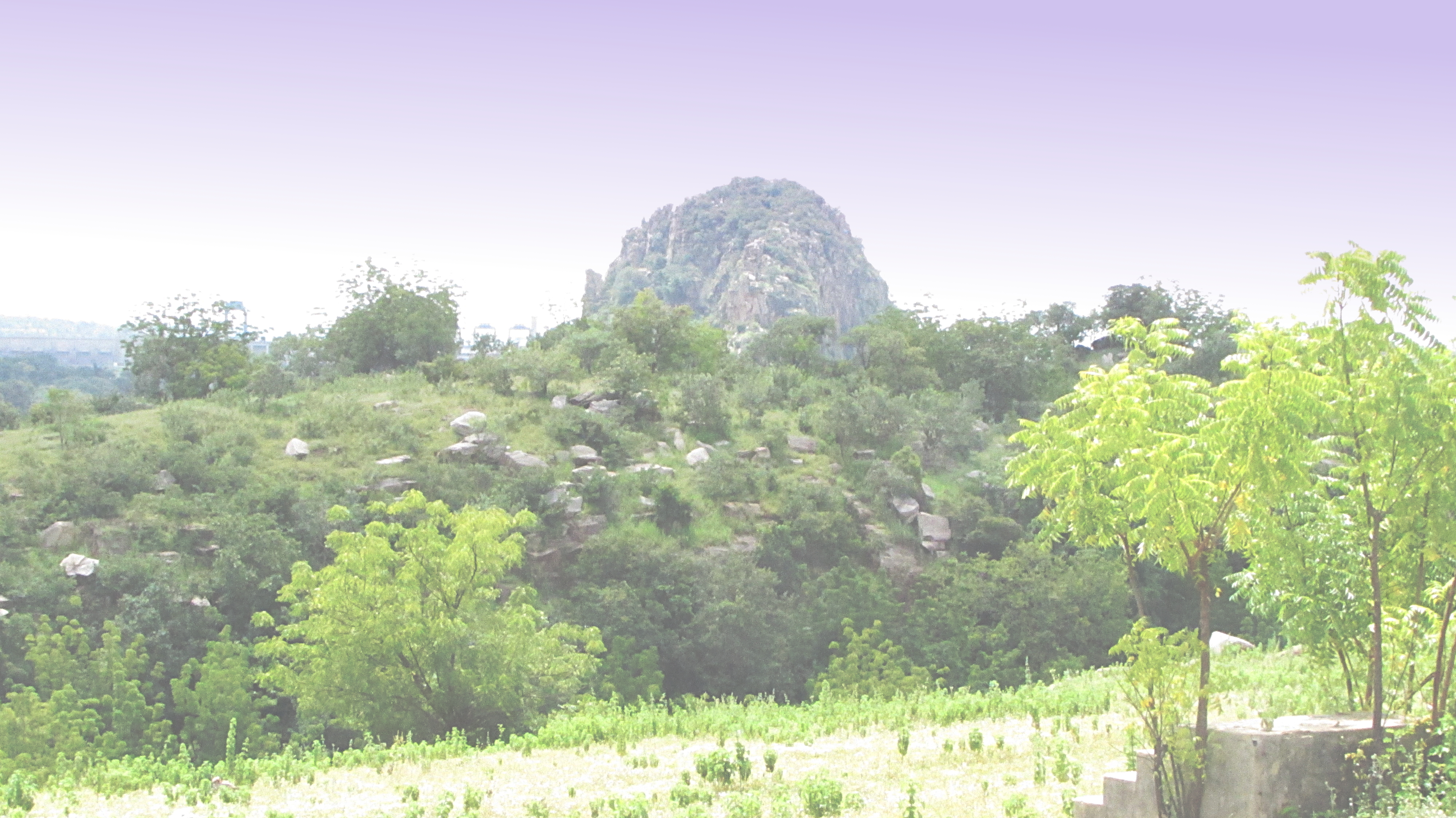
Juju Rock. View from Mungo Park Cenopath

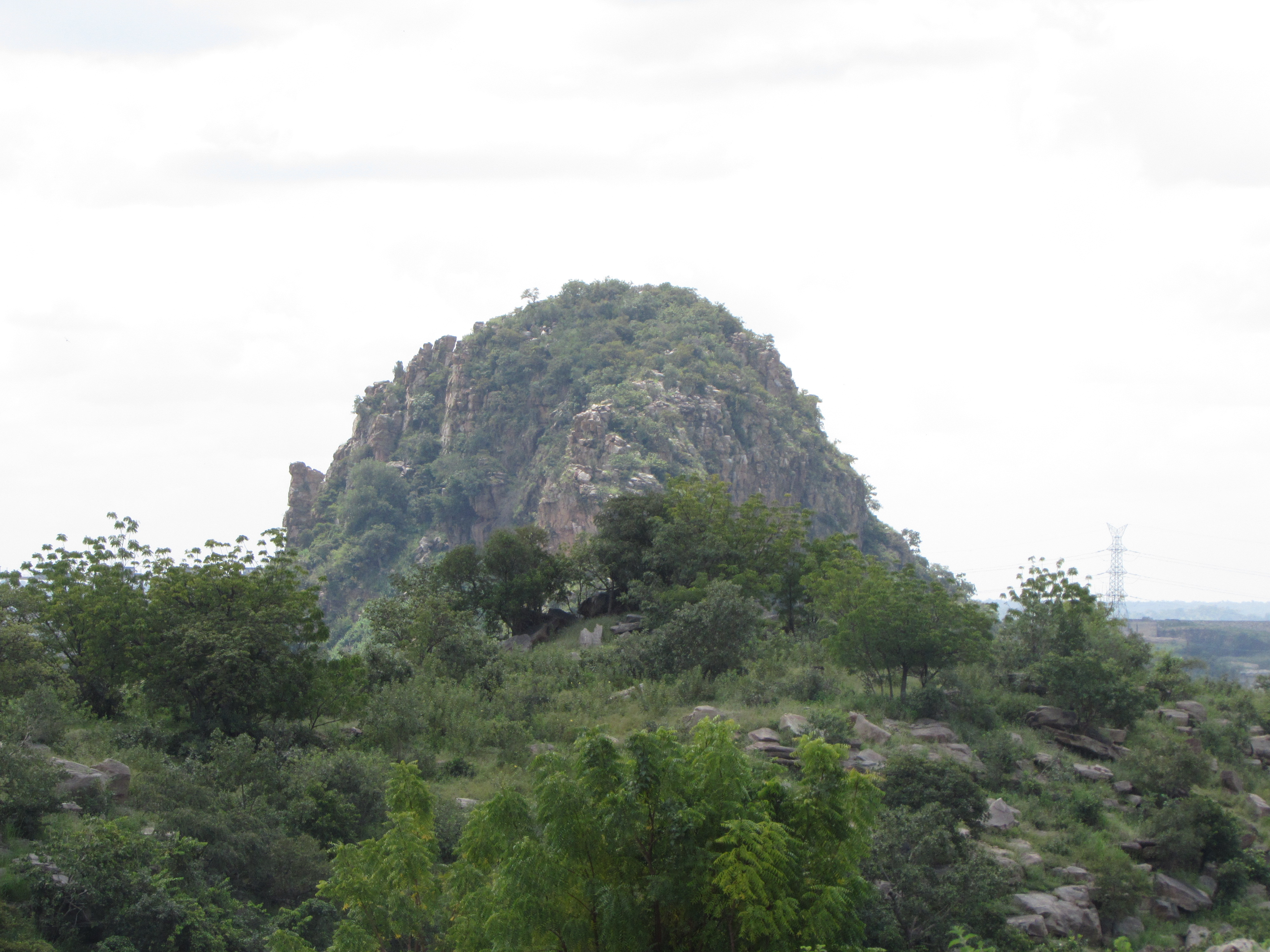
Juju Rock.

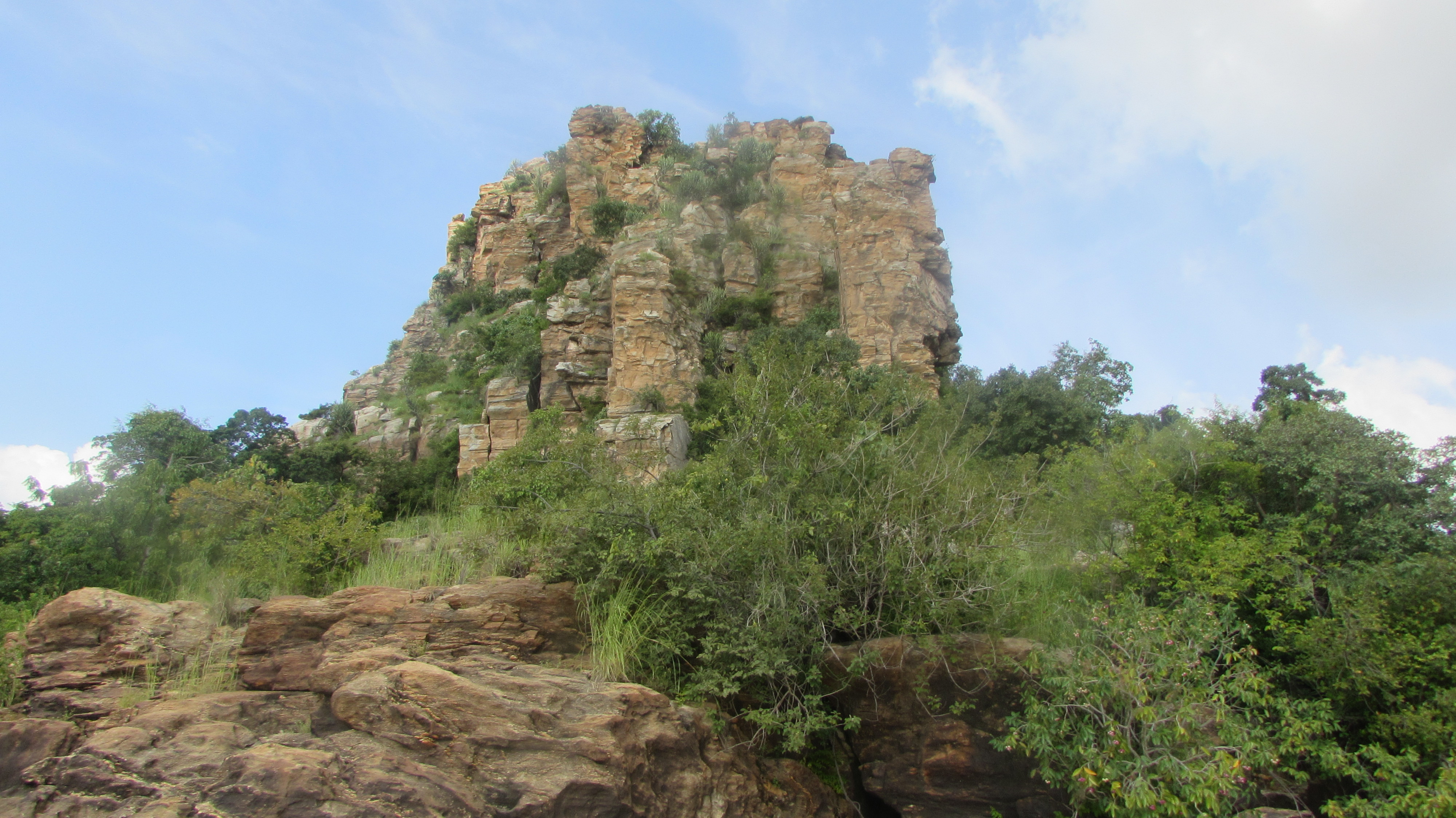
Juju Rock

== Markets ==
Markets are very important places to every society especially in the olden days. They offer a place of common interest to the farmers, traders, sellers and even the spectators.

In the olden days, markets are places where people meet for social interaction with the others. Where young girls meet with their suitors, older men with their concubines, friends and age mates meeting to exchange ideas, discuss issues or jokes. As civilization begins to spread from one country to the other, it can be said that the main purpose of establishing market places nowadays is just to facilitate the exchange of goods and services at a price acceptable to both the seller and the buyer.

The markets in Jebba started shortly after the founder established the main market at Onipako and as the population grows many other market places came into being while some of the early ones have gone out of existence for the sake of history, they are all mentioned below.

1. Onipako
2. Oja (defunct) at Oke Oja
3. Garika
4. Ipata
5. Berger
6. Station
7. Oja Ipata
8. Idiagbon

Out of the above-mentioned market places, only that of Idi-Agbon functions at night even up till today, consumable items like fresh/roasted fish, ingredients, rice, beans, palm oil, 'Eko', 'Kulikuli' and the like are mostly sold in this market. These items could be used in preparing a very quick dish after the day's labour.

== See also ==
- Railway stations in Nigeria
