= Ahmed Abdullahi (governor) =

Military administrator

Military Administrator of Kwara State
- In office December 1987 – July 1988
- Preceded by: Mohammed Ndatsu Umaru
- Succeeded by: Ibrahim Alkali

Personal details
- Born: 22 August 1945 (age 81) Freetown, Sierra Leone

Brigadier General (retired) Ahmed Abdullahi Pronouciation was Military Administrator of Kwara State, Nigeria between December 1987 and July 1988 during the military regime under General Ibrahim Babangida.

== Birth and education ==
Abdullahi was born in Freetown, Sierra Leone, on 22 August 1945. He attended primary schools in Zaria and Keffi and secondary schools in Freetown and Abuja. He was admitted to the Nigerian Defence Academy, Kaduna, graduating in 1968. Later he studied at the British Army Royal School of Signals for Basic Communications (1970–1971), US Army School of Artillery, Oklahoma, United States (1975), Command and Staff College, Jaji (1978), US Marines Staff College, Onautico, USA (1980–1981) and the Imperial Defence College, London (1991–1992).

== Military career ==
Abdullahi was commissioned as lieutenant in July 1968. He was appointed second in command and then commander of 2 Division Signal Regiment, Benin City. In 1973 he became Commander, 4th division Signal Regiment. He was a lecturer at the Command and Staff College, Jaji (1982–1984).

Lt. Colonel Abdullahi was appointed Minister of Communications (1984–1985). In this role, he assisted in the coup of August 1985 in which General Ibrahim Babangida took power. On 12 September 1985 he was appointed Minister of Social Development, Youth and Sport, and was a member of the Federal Executive Council. He was appointed military governor of Kwara State from December 1987 until July 1988. General Abdullahi was Director of Military Intelligence (DMI) and a supporter of General Sani Abacha at the time of the annulment of the presidential election of M.K.O. Abiola in 1993, which led to Sani Abacha taking power as head of state.

== Tenure ==
Lt. Col. Ahmed Abdullahi was appointed Governor of Kwara State in 1986, known for his work on water provision and agricultural development. Abdullahi worked with UNICEF, BIWATER Rural Water Supply Scheme, and the Directorate For Food, Roads and Rural Infrastructures (DFRRI) to provide clean drinking water to communities across the state. He also encouraged agricultural cultivation by building fertilizer stores, agro-service centers, and tractor subsidy schemes. In addition to his work on water and agriculture, Abdullahi also promoted industrial and commercial development in Kwara State. He established or supported a number of businesses, including Kwara Breweries, Erin-Ile Paper Converters, United Foam Limited, Gateway Insurance Company, Kwara Furniture Manufacturing Company, Kwara Hotels Limited, and Trade Bank. Abdullahi's administration also introduced a program that provided matching grants to communities that embarked on communal projects in the priority areas of electricity, water, roads, and health. Abdullahi's tenure as governor was marked by significant progress in a number of areas. He is remembered as a capable and effective leader who made a lasting impact on Kwara State.

== Death ==
Lt. Colonel Abdullahi passed on in the month of February 2021, after a brief illness.
