= Nigerian Communications Commission =

Communications regulatory agency in Nigeria

- Industry: telecommunications
- Predecessor: Aminu Maida
- Founded: 24 November 1992
- Founder: Ibrahim Babangida
- Successor: Idris Olorunnimbe
- Headquarters: Plot 423, Aguiyi Ironsi Street, Maitama, Abuja, Federal Capital Territory, Nigeria

The Nigerian Communications Commission (NCC) is the independent regulatory authority for the telecommunications industry in Nigeria. The NCC was created under Decree number 75 by the Federal Military Government of Ibrahim Babangida in Nigeria on 24 November 1992. The NCC was charged with the responsibility of regulating the supply of telecommunications services and facilities, promoting competition, and setting performance standards for telephone services in Nigeria. The Decree has been abrogated and replaced with the Nigerian Communications Act (NCA) 2003. Idris Olorunnimbe is the current Chairman of the Board of the Nigerian Communications Commission (NCC), appointed by President Bola Tinubu in August 2025, while Aminu Maida is the present head of (NCC) assumed office in 2023. in 2025, NCC called for a round table discussion with the various industry stakeholders on broadband.

== See also ==
- List of telecommunications regulatory bodies
