= Cabinet of Ibrahim Babangida =

1985 Council of ministers in Nigeria

The National Council of Ministers of the Babangida administration was inaugurated in September 1985 and was made up of a mixture of civilian and serving and former military officers. But towards the end of the administration in January 1993, a transitional council made up of civilian cabinet members with the official titles of secretary was inaugurated.

The Babangida cabinet
Office	Name	Term
Head of State/ President	Ibrahim Babangida	1985-1993
Chief of General Staff Chief of General Staff Vice President	Ebitu Ukiwe Augustus Aikhomu	1985-1986 1986-1990 1990-1993
Education	Jibril Aminu Babs Fafunwa	1985-1990 1990-1992
Defense	Domkat Bali Sani Abacha	1985-1990 1990-1993
Trade	Gado Nasko Samaila Mamman Senas Ukpanah	1985-1986 1986-1989 1989-1992
Agriculture	Alani Akinrinade Gado Nasko Samaila Mamman Shettima Mustapha	1985-1986 1986-1989 1989-1989 1989-1992
Petroleum	Tam David-West Rilwan Lukman Jibril Aminu Chu Okongwu	1985-1986 1986-1989 1989-1992 1992-1993
Finance	Chu Okongwu Olu Falae Abubakar Alhaji	1986-1990 1990-1990 1990-1993
External Affairs	Bolaji Akinyemi Ike Nwachukwu Rilwan Lukman Ike Nwachukwu	1985-1987 1987-1989 1989-1990 1990-1993
Communications	Tanko Ayuba David Mark Olawale Ige	1985-1987 1987-1990 1990-1992
Mines and Power	Tam David-West Bunu Sheriff Musa Nura Imam	1986-1986 1986-1989 1989-1991
Works and Housing	Hamza Abdullahi Abubakar Umar Mamman Kontagora	1985-19876 1986-1988 1988-1993
Industry	Bunu Sheriff Musa Alani Akinrinade Muhammadu Yahaya	1985-1986 1986-1989 1989-1991
Justice	Bola Ajibola Clement Akpamgbo	1985-1992 1992-1993
Information	Anthony Ukpo Tony Momoh Alex Akinyele	1985-1986 1986-1990 1990-1991
Budget and Planning	Kalu Idika Kalu Abubakar Alhaji Chu Okongwu	1985-1988 1988-1990 1990-1992
Health	Olikoye Ransome-Kuti	1985-1992
Internal Affairs	John Shagaya Lamba Gwom Bagudu Mamman Tunji Olagunju	1985-1990 1990-1990 1990-1992 1992-1993
Aviation	Anthony Okpere Alabo Graham Douglas	1987-1989 1989-1992
Sports/Youth	Ahmed Abdullahi Bayo Lawal Anthony Ikhazoboh Y.Y. Kure	1985-1986 1986-1989 1990-1991 1991-1992
Employment and Labour	Patrick Koshoni Ike Nwachukwu Abubakar Umar Bunu Sheriff Musa	1985-1986 1986-1987 1988-1990 1990-1992
Federal Capital Territory	Mamman Vatsa Hamza Abdullahi Gado Nasko	1985-1986 1986-1989 1989-1993
Science and Technology	Emmanuel Emovon Gordian Ezekwe	1985-1989 1989-1992
Special Duties	Aboyi Shekari Hamza Abdullahi	1986-1989 1989-1990
Transport	Jeremiah Useni Kalu I Kalu Alani Akinrinade Lamba Gwom	1985-1988 1988-1989 1989-1990 1990-1992
