= Interim National Government =

1993 transition government in Nigeria

- Cabinet of Nigeria
- Date established: 27 August 1993
- Date dissolved: 17 November 1993

Leadership and composition
- Head of state: Ernest Shonekan
- Head of government: Ernest Shonekan

Formation and history
- Predecessor: Government of General Ibrahim Babangida
- Successor: Government of General Sani Abacha

The Interim National Government was the short-lived civilian administration that governed Nigeria, following the crisis of the Third Republic. The largely powerless and illegitimate government was dissolved when General Sani Abacha seized power on 17 November 1993.

== History ==
12 June 1993 presidential election was won by Moshood Abiola. General Babangida annulled the election.This led to rioting, particularly in the south, which was harshly suppressed. Babangida announced that he would step down on 26 August 1993, and handed over to Ernest Shonekan as head of the Interim National Government (ING) on 27 August 1993. Shoenkan had a degree in law, had studied at the Harvard Business School in the US, and had held senior management positions in various companies. He was an Oloye of the Yoruba people and had been president of Babangida's Transitional Council. He was an unelected technocrat chosen in a deal between Babangida and political leaders, and his appointment was poorly received by the press and the public.

Shonekan appointed Moshood Abiola as his vice-president. General Sani Abacha was made secretary of defence in the cabinet. Under the ING the country suffered runaway inflation and saw strikes by workers in various sectors. Most foreign investors withdrew apart from oil companies. Shonekan made efforts to have government debt forgiven. He drew up a timetable for return to democracy and for withdrawal of Nigeria's contingent from the ECOMOG preackeeping force in Liberia. He also launched an audit of the Nigerian National Petroleum Corporation, the largest oil company, and tried to restore civil liberties. Shonekan managed to remove laws that allowed arbitrary arrest and confiscation of property, promoted press freedom, obtained the release of some political prisoners and made reforms to the corrupt public services and state-owned companies.

No clear process was given for holding fresh elections, and there was general political uncertainty under the Shonekan government. The ING faced media campaigns against the delay in returning to democracy and the continued involvement of the military in politics. The government was opposed by pro-democracy activists, civil society organisations, labour unions and students. The Lagos high court nullified Shonekan's appointment and called for Abiola to be sworn in as the elected candidate for the presidency. General Sani Abacha forced Shonekan to resign on 17 November 1993, and as the most senior military officer took over as head of state.

== Ministers ==
The ministers initially announced were:

- Vice-President: Moshood Abiola
- Defense: General Aliyu Mohammed Gusau
- Abuja: Lieutenant General Gado Nasko
- Agriculture: Jerry Gana
- Communications: Dapo Sarumi
- Education: Abraham Inanoya Imogie
- Energy: Donald Etiebet
- Finance: Aminu Saleh
- Foreign Affairs: Chief Matthew Mbu
- Health and Human Service: Adelusi Adeluyi
- Industry: Chief Ignatius Kogbara
- Information: Uche Chukwumerije
- Interior: E. S. Yusufu
- Labor: Bola Afonja
- Power: Hassan Adamu
- Trade: Kuforiji Olubi
- Transportation: Bashir Dalhatu

The final list of members was:

- Head of State: Chief Ernest Shonekan
- Defence Secretary: Gen. Sani Abacha
- Secretary of State (Defence): Alhaji Umaru Baba
- Agriculture/Natural Resources: Prof. Jerry Gana
- Commerce/Tourism: Chief Mrs. Kuforiji Olubi
- Communications: Chief Dapo Sarumi
- Education and Youth Development: Prof. Abraham Imogie
- Finance: Alhaji Aminu Saleh
- FCT Administrator: Maj.Gen. Gado Nasko
- Foreign Affairs: Chief Matthew Mbu
- Secretary of State (Foreign): Alhaji Saidu Isa
- Health and Human Services: Prince Adelusi Adeluyi
- Internal Affairs: Chief Ezekiel Yesufu
- Industries: Chief Ignatius Kogbara
- Information and Culture: Mr. Uche Chukwumerije
- Justice: Mr. Clement Akpamgbo SAN
- Petroleum/Mineral Resources: Chief Donald Etiebet
- Secretary of State (Petroleum): Alhaji Ibrahim Al
- Labour and Productivity: Prince Bola Afonja
- Power and Steel: Alhaji Hassan Adamu
- Secretary of State (Power and Steel): Alhaji Oladunni Ayandipo
- Police Affairs: Alhaji Abdullahi Mahmud Koki
- Science and Technology: Prof. Bartholomew Nnaji
- Transport/Aviation: Alh. Bashir Dalhatu
- Water/Rural Development: Alhaji Isa Mohammed
- Works/Housing: Mr. Barnabas Gemade
- Chairman, National Planning Commission: Mr. Isaac Aluko-Olokun
- Establishment/Management Services: Mr. Innocent Nwoga
- States and Local Government Affairs: Alhaji Sule Unguwar Alkali
- Secretary to Interim National Government: Alhaji Mustapha Umara
- National Assembly Liaison Officer: Alhaji Abba Dabo (House of Representatives)
- National Assembly Liaison Officer: Dr. Samuel Ogboghodo (House of Representatives)
- National Assembly Liaison Officer: Senator George Hoomkwap (Senate)

== Sources ==
- Ayo Olukotun (2004). Repressive State and Resurgent Media Under Nigeria's Military Dictatorship, 1988–98. Nordic Africa Institute. ISBN 978-91-7106-524-7.
- Cajetan N. Iheka (2012). "Abacha, Sani". Dictionary of African Biography. ISBN 978-0-19-538207-5.
- "Daily Times news item, 1993". Daily Times of Nigeria.
- Wale Fatade (2014). "In the interim, a government in a fix". Daily Independent.
