= Nigeria Tax Act 2025 =

2025 Nigerian tax reform legislation

Nigeria Tax Act, 2025

National Assembly of Nigeria
- Long title: An Act to Repeal Certain Acts on Taxation and Consolidate the Legal Frameworks Relating to Taxation and Enact the Nigeria Tax Act to Provide for Taxation of Income, Transactions and Instruments; and for Related Matters
- Citation: Nigeria Tax Act, 2025 No. 7
- Considered by: National Assembly of Nigeria
- Assented to: 26 June 2025
- Signed by: Bola Tinubu
- Signed: 26 June 2025
- Commenced: 1 January 2026

Legislative history
- Bill title: Nigeria Tax Bill
- Introduced by: Presidential Fiscal Policy and Tax Reforms Committee
- Status: In force

The Nigeria Tax Act 2025 (NTA), commonly referred to as part of the Nigerian Tax Reform Acts or Nigeria's 2026 tax reform, is a Nigerian federal statute that consolidates and overhauls the country's tax framework. It was signed into law by President Bola Tinubu on 26 June 2025, alongside three companion statutes, the Nigeria Tax Administration Act, the Nigeria Revenue Service (Establishment) Act, and the Joint Revenue Board (Establishment) Act, collectively known as the Tax Reform Acts. Most substantive provisions of the NTA took effect on 1 January 2026.

The Act repeals and consolidates several pre-existing tax statutes, including the Companies Income Tax Act, the Personal Income Tax Act, the Value Added Tax Act, the Capital Gains Tax Act, the Petroleum Profits Tax Act and the Stamp Duties Act, replacing them with a single, unified legislative framework. President Tinubu called the reforms "a once-in-a-generation opportunity". The Act aims to widen the tax base and cut the number of levies, and it moves tax administration to digital tools such as mandatory e-invoicing.

== Background ==
In July 2023 President Tinubu set up the Presidential Committee on Fiscal Policy and Tax Reforms, chaired by Taiwo Oyedele, with responsibility for tax law reform and the harmonisation of taxes. Four related bills were introduced to the National Assembly and passed before being signed into law by President Tinubu on 26 June 2025. Some provisions of the companion Acts took effect when they were signed, while the Nigeria Tax Act itself was set to commence on 1 January 2026. In September 2025, Finance Minister Wale Edun said the law, including a contested 5% surcharge on petrol, diesel and other fossil fuels, would not take effect before that date, and that the surcharge also needed an order published in the official gazette before it could apply.

== Key provisions ==
=== Personal income tax ===
Under the Act, the first ₦800,000 of a person's annual income is taxed at 0%, and income above that is taxed in bands at rates rising to 25%. The tax-exemption threshold for compensation for loss of employment or injury was also raised, from ₦10 million to ₦50 million. The law defines "resident" and "non-resident" individuals more precisely, extending Nigerian tax liability to the worldwide income of residents, determined by domicile, habitual abode, family and economic ties, or physical presence in Nigeria for at least 183 days in a year.

=== Corporate and capital gains tax ===
Section 56 of the Act defines small companies as those with an annual turnover of ₦50 million or less and fixed assets of ₦250 million or less, excluding professional services firms. They pay no Companies Income Tax and are also exempt from Capital Gains Tax and the new Development Levy. The Capital Gains Tax rate for companies was raised from 10% to 30%, aligning it with the corporate income tax rate, and the Act extends Capital Gains Tax to indirect transfers of shares in Nigerian companies through offshore holding structures. A new Development Levy of 4% of assessable profits applies to non-exempt companies, consolidating several pre-existing levies, including the Tertiary Education Tax, the Information Technology Levy, the NASENI levy, and the Police Trust Fund levy. Large multinational groups are subject to a minimum effective tax rate of 15%, in line with international efforts on global minimum taxation.

=== Value-added tax ===
The standard Value Added Tax rate of 7.5% was retained, but the Act expands the list of VAT zero-rated goods and services to include basic food items, medical and pharmaceutical products, educational materials, tuition, and electricity transmission services, and it introduces broader input VAT recovery rights for businesses. The Act also codifies mandatory e-invoicing and "VAT fiscalisation" rules, requiring businesses to adopt a tax-authority-administered digital invoicing system.

=== Administration ===
The companion Nigeria Revenue Service (Establishment) Act replaces the Federal Inland Revenue Service (FIRS) with a new agency, the Nigeria Revenue Service, as the central body responsible for assessing and collecting federally-collectible taxes. The Joint Revenue Board (Establishment) Act creates a coordinating body between federal and state tax authorities, and the package also establishes a Tax Ombuds office to mediate taxpayer disputes.

== Implementation and reception ==
The reforms took effect amid an already difficult economic backdrop shaped by the 2023 removal of Nigeria's fuel subsidy and a sharp naira devaluation, which made their timing politically awkward. The opposition Peoples Democratic Party called for a suspension of the Act's commencement date, alleging discrepancies between the version of the law passed by the National Assembly and the version later gazetted by the government. In January 2026, professional services firm KPMG Nigeria published an analysis identifying what it described as errors, gaps and inconsistencies in the gazetted text, including in provisions on share taxation, dividend treatment, and non-resident obligations, and called for the laws to be reviewed. Taiwo Oyedele, chairman of the Presidential Fiscal Policy and Tax Reforms Committee, publicly rejected KPMG's criticisms and defended the Act's drafting and policy intent. The Nigerian government has continued to describe the reforms as intended to protect low-income earners and small businesses while broadening the overall tax base.

== See also ==
- Nigeria Revenue Service
- Economy of Nigeria
- Bola Tinubu
