= Afonja (disambiguation) =

Afonja was the chief military leader of the Oyo Empire. Afonja may also refer to:

== People ==
- Biyi Afonja (born 1935), Nigerian academician
- Bola Afonja (1943–2024), Nigerian politician
- Olaniyi Afonja (born 1974), Nigerian comedian

== Other uses ==
- Ilê Axé Opô Afonjá, temple in Brazil
