= Post Assurance Brokers =

Nigerian insurance company

Post Assurance Brokers Limited
- Type: Private
- Industry: Insurance; Financial services
- Founded: 1985; 41 years ago
- Headquarters: Lagos, Nigeria
- Key people: Lekan Ajisafe (CEO); Omotayo Balogun (Managing Director)
- Products: Insurance, Property Casualty: Commercial & Consumer, Life & Retirement
- Website: www.postassurancebrokers.com

Post Assurance Brokers Limited, also known as Post Assurance Brokers, is a Nigerian insurance company established in 1985, and headquartered in Lagos, Nigeria. The service of Post Assurance brokers ranges from commercial to personal insurance and risk management. The company was licensed, and is regulated by the National Insurance Commission (NAICOM).

The products and services of Post Assurance Brokers covers travel/health insurance, personal accident / group personal accident, employer's liability, fidelity guarantee, goods-in-transit, burglary/theft, consequential loss, fire & perils, amongst others. The management team of the company is led by the Chief Executive Officer, Mr Lekan Ajisafe. Post Assurance Brokers has partnership with global insurers around the World and played host to a consortium of international insurance companies from the United Kingdom, comprising Lloyds, Lockton LLP, Cathedral, Atrium, and Talbot in 2017.
