= Bashir Dalhatu =

Nigerian aristocrat, statesman, politician and lawyer

Bashir Dalhatu Waziri of Dutse

Minister of Internal Affairs
- In office 15 December 1997 – 21 August 1998
- President: Sani Abacha: Abdulsalami Abubakar
- Preceded by: Alex Ibru
- Succeeded by: Sunday Afolabi

Minister of Power and Steel
- In office December 1993 – 17 November 1997
- President: Sani Abacha
- Preceded by: Hassan Adamu
- Succeeded by: Baba Gana Kingibe

Secretary of Transport and Aviation
- In office 27 August 1993 – 17 November 1993
- President: Ernest Shonekan
- Preceded by: Tonye Graham-Douglas (Aviation): Lamba Gwom (Transport)
- Succeeded by: Ebenezer Babatope

Personal details
- Born: Bashir Mohammed Dalhatu; 12 November 1949 (age 76) Dutse, British Nigeria
- Spouse(s): Affiah Bashir (m. 1970) Zainab Abacha (m. 1999)
- Children: 9

Bashir Dalhatu (born 12 November 1949), titled Wazirin Dutse, is a Nigerian aristocrat, statesman and lawyer . He was a politician who served in the Interim National Government as Minister of Transport and Aviation in 1993; in General Sani Abacha's government as Minister of Power and Steel from 1993 to 1997 and Minister of Internal Affairs from 1997 to 1998.

== Biography ==
Bashir Dalhatu was born in Dutse on 12 November 1949. He attended Rumfa College, Kano from 1963 to 1967. In 1972, he received a bachelor's degree in law from the Ahmadu Bello University in Zaria, and was subsequently called to the bar in 1973 before later studying law in London.

He served in the Government of Kano State in various ministries: the Kano State Ministry of Works and Survey and Ministry of Agriculture, before later becoming state counsel in the Ministry of Justice. He later founded a private practice B. M. Dalhatu & Co. in Kano.

In 1993, Dalhatu served in the Interim National Government as the Secretary of Transport and Aviation. He also served in Sani Abacha's government as Minister of Power and Steel from 1993 to 1997; and Minister of Internal Affairs from 1997 to 1998, and later married Abacha's daughter.

In 2018, he was promoted from Walin Dutse, to succeed his brother Muktar Muhammed as the Waziri (chief adviser to the Emir) of the Dutse Emirate. Dalhatu is also the honorary consul to Tunisia.

== Political interests ==
He was elected into the 1978 constituent assembly that produced the 1979 Constitution. At the conclusion of the assembly, he became one of the founding members of the National Party of Nigeria where, between 1979 and 1983, he was the assistant national legal advisor, Kano State assistant secretary, and state secretary.

He was later an executive member of the National Republican Convention and chairman of the Think Tank of the Presidential Campaign. He later became a founding member of the Peoples Democratic Party, before leaving to contest Governor of Jigawa State under the All Nigeria Peoples Party.

In 2006, in opposition to Olusegun Obasanjo, Dalhatu founded the Advanced Congress of Democrats, before later merging the party with the Action Congress of Nigeria, where he was the national secretary until resigning in 2007, after the party refused to join Umaru Yar'Adua's government.

In July 2023, the Arewa Consultative Forum (ACF) appointed Dalhatu as Board of Trustees Chairman. The ACF is an association that promotes the political interests of people of Northern Nigeria.

== Business ==
He is the Vice Chairman of Freedom Radio Nigeria, one of the most popular stations in Northern Nigeria. He became the Chairman of the New Nigeria Development Corporation in 2015. He is also the Chairman of Highland Waters and Marketing Limited.

He was a Member, Board of Directors at Nigerian Ports Authority and a member of both the Nigerian Bar Association as well as the International Bar Association.

== See also ==
- Jigawa State
