= Okongwu =

Surname list

Okongwu is a surname of Nigerian origin. Notable people with the surname include:

- Chu Okongwu (1934–2022), Nigerian economist and politician
- Onyeka Okongwu (born 2000), American basketball player
