= Asumoh Ete Ekukinam =

Nigerian politician (born 1929)

Minister of Finance
- In office 1976–1977
- Preceded by: Shehu Shagari
- Succeeded by: James Oluleye

Personal details
- Born: 1929 (age 96–97) Akwa Ibom state
- Education: Atlanta University; Wharton School of Finance
- Profession: Economist Public Servant

Asumoh Ete Ekukinam (born 1929) was a Nigerian politician who served as the Finance Minister of the Federal Republic of Nigeria during the Nation's 2nd republic in 1976 and 1977.

== Early life ==
Ekukinam was born 1929 in Ikot Epene in Akwa Ibom State.

== Education ==
Ekukinam attended Methodist College, Uzoakali. He received further degrees from Atlanta University and the Wharton School of Finance, both in the US.

== Career ==
Ekukinam was director of research at the Central Bank of Nigeria from 1966 to 1972, and later vice-chairman and chairman of the social economic council to the governor of Southeastern state. Ekukinam was appointed the Minister of Finance replacing James Oluleye (1976–1977).
