= Lamba Gwom =

Nigerian soldier and statesman (1945–2021)

Da Cmdre Lamba Gwom Rtd (FSS, PSC, MNI)

Minister of Transport
- In office 1990–1992
- Preceded by: Alani Akinrinade
- Succeeded by: Bashir Dalhatu as Secretary of Transport and Aviation in the Interim National Government

Minister of Internal Affairs
- In office 1990–1990
- Preceded by: John Shagaya
- Succeeded by: Bagudu Mamman

Personal details
- Born: 10 August 1945 Were, Ropp British Nigeria (present-day Plateau State), Nigeria
- Died: 28 December 2021 (aged 76)
- Children: Peter Lamba Gwom
- Education: Nigerian Military School, Zaria Nigerian Defence Academy, Kaduna
- Occupation: Soldier/entrepreneur

Military service
- Allegiance: Nigeria
- Branch/service: Nigerian Navy
- Years of service: 1968 – 1990
- Rank: Commodore

Da Lamba Dung Gwom (10 August 1945 – 28 December 2021) was a Nigerian Navy commodore and statesman who served as Minister of Internal Affairs in the cabinet of President Ibrahim Babangida. He also served as Minister of Transport and then briefly again as Minister of Culture in 1992 under the same president.

Lagos – March 1990. As Minister of Internal Affairs, during a tour of the Kirikiri Medium Security Prison, Lamba Gwom warned officials of the Nigerian Prisons Service to improve the living conditions of prison inmates. He said so in reaction to Amnesty International's criticism of overcrowding and general bad conditions of Nigerian prisons. He also made sweeping reforms in the area of improvement of healthcare for inmates, granting of parole and suspended sentences for inmates and building of new prisons the latter two to curb the problem of overcrowding.

On 11 October 1990, the Kano branch of the Nigerian Shippers' Council was opened by The Honourable Minister of Transport Commodore Lamba Gwom.

He died on 28 December 2021.

Abuja – 6 January 2022 in a condolence message to his family and Plateau State, broadcast on national radio (Radio Nigeria), President Muhammadu Buhari described the deceased soldier as someone who served Nigeria meritoriously with simplicity, diligence and discipline and always put the nation first.
