= Bola Kuforiji-Olubi =

Nigerian politician, accountant and banker (1936–2016)

Chief Bola Kuforiji-Olubi OON MON

Minister of Commerce and Industry
- In office August 1993 – 17 November 1993
- Head of State: Ernest Shonekan

Personal details
- Born: 28 September 1936
- Died: 3 December 2016 (aged 80) Lagos, Nigeria
- Education: University of London
- Occupation: Politician; accountant; banker

Chief Bola Kuforiji-Olubi OON MON (28 September 1936 – 3 December 2016) was a Nigerian traditional aristocrat, accountant, banker and politician. She was minister of commerce and industry in 1993 during the Interim National Government of Chief Ernest Shonekan. In addition to a variety of other chieftaincy titles, she held that of the Otunba Ayora of Ijebu Ode.

== Life ==
=== Education and memberships ===
Kuforiji-Olubi Bola was born on 28 September 1936. Bola Kuforiji-Olubi graduated from the University of London in 1963 with B. Sc. honors in Economics. She started her profession as a Grade Two (II) Teacher at Zawan Girls Catholic Primary School, Jos, Plateau State, and she became headmistress in 1955 at age 19. During her subsequent career, she became a fellow of the Institute of Charted Accountants, England and Wales in 1977, ICAN Nigeria in 1976, and the British Chartered Institute of company secretaries (ACIS) in 1964. She was also a member of both the Nigerian Institute of Management (FMIN) and the British Institute of Directors.

=== Honours ===
Kuforiji-Olubi was a recipient of the following honors and awards:

- Doctor of Business Administration from Enugu State University of Science and Technology, 1997
- Doctor of Laws, LLD honoris causa (Latin: "for the sake of the honor"). Bayero University, Kano, 2004
- Doctor of letters (Honoris Causa), Olabisi Onabanjo University, Ago Iwoye, Ogun State, 2006.
- The National award of member of the Order of the Niger in 1979 for her contributions to management education and socio-economic advancement of Nigeria
- The certificate of merit by the United Nations Decade for Women in 1980
- The award for excellence from the University of Benn's Skonit Club in 1988
- The position of Honorary Grammarian of the CMS by the CMS grammar school in 1988
- The award of excellence by the Brigade of Nigeria in 1992
- The international award of excellence for outstanding entrepreneurial achievements, Massachusetts Institute of Technology, Cambridge, Massachusetts, United States.
- A recipient of the 2002 conferment award for a woman of achievement under the auspices of the Woman Development Centre, Abuja, 2005.

=== Positions held ===
Kuforiji-Olubi served in various capacities both locally and internationally. She was the 25th president of the Institute of Chartered Accountants of Nigeria and the first female to become president of the Institute; while she was in office, she launched an Accounting Technicians Course.

She was the first Nigerian woman to become the CEO of a multinational company (VYB Industries Limited, with British affiliates (Inchcape plc) and the first female Chairperson of a publicly listed company (Bewac Plc).

Kufuriji-Olubi either chaired or otherwise served on the boards of many other companies. She was the first Chairperson of the Osun River basin development (from 1976 to 1980) and a member of the governing council of the Nigerian Institute of Social and Economic research (NISER) (from 1981 to 1983). She was appointed chairman of a leading financial institution, United Bank for Africa Plc, in 1984 and served until 1990 as the first woman to hold that office in Africa south of the Sahara. She was also later vice chair of the National Conference on Nigerian Foreign Policy (until the year 2000) and a member of the National Sport Commission (from 1986 to 1989). A foundation member and chair of the Lagos State Education endowment fund, she was appointed as the honorable secretary (or Minister) for commerce and tourism in the interim national government of Nigeria in 1993. In addition to this, she was also a deputy chair and federal commissioner for Ogun State at the revenue mobilization.

=== Publications ===
- The Female Entrepreneur and Financial Management for Survival (1987)
- Civil service reform in a developing economy (1988)
- The Corporate Woman: a marginalised group, problem and strategies for success, via public enlightenment programmes of the institute of directors (1989)
- Technical education as a catalyst for technical cooperation and economic growth in developing countries (1992)
- Changing Course - as a co-author.
