= Federal Ministry of Finance =

Federal Ministry of Finance may refer to:

- Federal Ministry of Finance (Brazil)
- Federal Ministry of Finance (Germany)
- Federal Ministry of Finance (Nigeria)

== See also ==
- Ministry of Finance (disambiguation)
