= Kalu Idika Kalu =

Nigerian politician (born 1939)

Minister of finance
- In office 1985–1986
- President: Ibrahim Babangida
- Preceded by: Onaolapo Soleye
- Succeeded by: Chu Okongwu

Minister of finance
- In office 1993–1994
- Preceded by: Aminu Saleh
- Succeeded by: Anthony Ani

Minister of national planning

Minister of transportation

Personal details
- Born: 14 October 1939 (age 86) Owerri, imo State
- Education: Kings College Lagos; University of Wisconsin

Kalu Idika Kalu (born 14 October 1939) is a Nigerian politician. He was finance minister twice, minister of national planning and transportation minister. He was a presidential aspirant in the 2003 Nigeria general elections under the platform of The New Nigeria Peoples Party (NNPP).

== Early life ==
Kalu was born in Owerri, Imo state, southeastern Nigeria. He is from Ebem Ohafia in Abia state Nigeria. He is from Ibo tribe in Nigeria.

He studied at Kings College Lagos from 1954 to 1960 where he obtained a Bachelor of Science in Economics in 1964. Kalu also obtained a Masters of Arts in Economics in 1965, as well as a Doctorate Degree in economic development and public finance in 1972 from the University of Wisconsin. He was a Stimson Fellow while attending Yale University.

== Career ==
He was a founding member of the Justice Party, but ran for president on the platform of NNPP during the 2003 Nigerian presidential election.

He participated in research work on developing countries and lectured at university level. While at the World Bank East Asia and Pacific Programs Department, Kalu contributed significantly to micro- and macro-economic work on the economies of Japan, Korea, Taiwan and Hong Kong.

He held various official positions in Nigeria and outside Nigeria including:

- Commissioner for finance and planning in Imo State
- Minister of finance
- Minister for national planning
- Minister of transport
- Chairman, ECOWAS Council of Ministers
- Chairman, development committee of the World Bank

He is a member of the All Progressives Congress (APC), joining after leaving the People Democratic Party (PDP), as he believes in the emergency of a strong two party system in Nigeria.

== Personal life ==
He married Imo Kalu, with whom he had five children.
