= Uzoka =

Uzoka is a surname. Notable people with the surname include:

- Chima Uzoka (born 1998), Filipino footballer
- Doris Uzoka-Anite (born 1981), Nigerian politician
