= Taiwo Oyedele =

Nigerian economist (born 1975)

- Oyedele in 2026

Minister of Finance and Coordinating Minister of the Economy
- Incumbent
- Assumed office 21 April 2026
- President: Bola Tinubu
- Preceded by: Wale Edun

Minister of State for Finance
- In office 16 March 2026 – 21 April 2026
- President: Bola Tinubu
- Preceded by: Doris Uzoka-Anite

Personal details
- Born: 18 June 1975 (age 51) Ikare-Akoko, Western State (now in Ondo State), Nigeria
- Education: Oxford Brookes University; Yaba College of Technology (HND, accountancy and finance)
- Alma mater: London School of Economics; Yale University; Harvard Kennedy School
- Occupation: Economist; accountant; politician
- Website: taiwooyedele.com

Taiwo Oyedele (born 18 June 1975) is a Nigerian economist, accountant and public policy expert who has served as the minister of finance and coordinating minister of the economy of Nigeria since 2026. He previously served as the minister of state for finance from March to April 2026.

He served as the chairman of the Presidential Committee on Fiscal Policy and Tax Reforms in Nigeria appointed by President Bola Tinubu. In March 2026, he was nominated by President Bola Tinubu and confirmed by Senate on 12 March 2026 to serve as minister of state for finance to replace Doris Uzoka-Anite. On 16 March 2026, he was sworn in and assumed office as the Nigerian minister of state for finance by President Bola Tinubu. On 21 April 2026, he was appointed the minister of finance and coordinating minister of the economy to replace Wale Edun.

== Early life and education ==
Oyedele was born in Ondo State and raised in Ikaram, Akoko. He obtained a Higher National Diploma (HND) in accountancy and finance from Yaba College of Technology (YABATECH) and BSc in applied accounting at the Oxford Brookes University. He completed executive education programmes at the London School of Economics, Yale University, Gordon Institute of Business Science and Harvard Kennedy School.

== Career ==
Oyedele's career spans several key roles in both the private and public sectors. He spent 22 years at PwC, joining in 2001 and rising to become the fiscal policy partner and Africa tax leader. During this period, he also served as the vice chairman of the National Tax Policy Committee for the Federal Ministry of Finance, contributing to national tax reforms. His work on regional policy includes serving as the chairman of the West Africa Union of Tax Institutes (WAUTI) High-Level Think-Tank on the ECOWAS Integration Project. He is also the thematic lead for the Fiscal Policy and Planning Commission and Chairman of the West Africa Debt Management Roundtable under the Nigerian Economic Summit Group (NESG). He also provided expert insight to the World Bank. He is the chairman of the Taxation and Fiscal Policy Faculty Board of the Institute of Chartered Accountants of Nigeria (ICAN). He was the dean of the Faculty of Direct Taxation at the Chartered Institute of Taxation of Nigeria (CITN). In July 2023, he departed PwC and was appointed chairman of the Presidential Committee on Fiscal Policy and Tax Reforms by President Bola Tinubu.

Under his leadership, the committee proposed the creation of a unified Nigerian Revenue Service to replace several existing tax agencies, with the aim of increasing Nigeria's tax-to-GDP ratio from approximately 10% to at least 18% within three years. In May 2025, the Senate passed four tax reform bills based on the committee's proposals, including legislation to establish the Nigeria Revenue Service and modify frameworks for VAT and petroleum royalties.

Oyedele is a professor at Babcock University, adjunct faculty at the University of Lagos and a visiting scholar at the Lagos Business School. He is the founder of Impact Africa Foundation; a non-profit organisation focused on social impact and youth empowerment. He is a fellow of the Institute of Chartered Accountants of Nigeria, Chartered Institute of Taxation of Nigeria, Association of Chartered Certified Accountants, Nigeria Leadership Initiative and a member of the Global Governing Council of the Association of Chartered Certified Accountants (ACCA), a member of the Global Tax Forum and Harvard Business Review Advisory Council.

On 21 April 2026, President Bola Tinubu appointed Oyedele as Nigeria's Minister of Finance and Coordinating Minister of the Economy following a cabinet reshuffle. He succeeded Wale Edun in the role.
