= Nkiruka =

- Gender: Female
- Language: Igbo

Origin
- Word/name: Igboland
- Meaning: That which the future holds is greater

Nkiruka is a female Igbo given name meaning "What the future holds is greater".

Gloss:

Nke - a demonstrative (in this case, "what," "that which")

ịrụ - "the future"

ka - "is greater"

== Names ==
Notable people with the name include:

- Nkiruka 'Kiki' Omeili, Nigerian actress
- Nkiruka Chidubem Onyejeocha
- Nkiruka Florence Nwakwe, Nigerian sprinter and hurdler
- Isioma Nkemdilim Nkiruka Daniel, Nigerian journalist
- Doris Nkiruka Uzoka-Anite, Nigerian politician and medical doctor
