= Presidential Enabling Business Environment Council =

The Presidential Enabling Business Environment Council (PEBEC) is a specialized agency set up by the President of Nigeria for Nigerian businesses. Its purpose is to make sure that doing business in Nigeria is easy through reforms and policies.

== History ==
PEBEC was inaugurated in 2016 by the President of the Federal Republic of Nigeria, Muhammadu Buhari, with the mandate to remove the critical bottleneck and bureaucratic constraints of doing business in Nigeria.

PEBEC collaborates with Ministries, Departments and Agencies (MDAs) and other partners to reduce the costs, time and number of procedures to make the process of setting up and doing business in Nigeria simpler and effective – from starting a business to getting a location to getting finance to dealing with day-to-day operations and ultimately to operating in a secure business environment.

The PEBEC’s regulatory reform program commenced in 2017 as an outcome from the 5th Presidential Quarterly Business Forum hosted by His Excellency, the Vice President at which private sector feedback firmly highlighted some of the regulatory hurdles and the costs associated with regulatory compliance for businesses. On the heels of this, the PEBEC introduced a pilot regulatory reform program focusing on two regulators – National Agency for Food and Drug Administration (NAFDAC) and the National Insurance Commission (NAICOM) from July 2018.

Since 2016, the initiative has implemented new electronic platforms to integrate business operations and introduced various policy reforms. These actions contributed to changes in Nigeria's World Bank Ease of Doing Business ranking during the 2017–2020 period.

The Ease of Doing Business Index (DBI) was an annual ranking done by the World Bank group that objectively assessed prevailing business climate conditions across 190 countries based on 10 indicators (starting a business, getting electricity, enforcing contracts etc.). The index captures ease of doing business reforms that have been validated by the organized private sector and offers comparative insights based on this validation. The rank ranges from 1 - 190. A high ease of doing business ranking means the regulatory environment is more conducive to the starting and running of a business.

In 2019, Nigeria ranked 131st place in the 2019/20 DBI report and named one of top 10 most improved economies in the world for the 2nd time in 3 years.

== Leadership ==
On the board of PEBEC, the Vice-President of Nigeria sits as the Chairman of the board with the Minister for Industry, Trade and Investment as the Vice-Chair. Also, on the board is the Governor of the Central Bank of Nigeria (CBN), the Executive Secretary, 10 Ministers, the Head of Civil Service of the Federation, representatives of Lagos & Kano State governments, the National Assembly and the private sector.

=== The Chairman ===
The head of the council is the chairman, elected by the President of the country. The term lasts for four years, and the chairman is typically appointed for each presidential term. The current chairman is the Vice President of Nigeria, Kashim Shettima.

=== The Vice-chairman ===
The Vice-Chair of the council assists the Chair in the administration of the boards affairs in ensuring the implementation of reforms. The current Vice-chairman is the Minister of Industry, Trade and Investment, [Dr Jumoke Oduwole MFR].

=== The Executive Secretary ===
The Executive Secretary oversees the affairs of the PEBEC and its administrative arm; The Enabling Business Secretariat (EBES). The current Executive Secretary is Jumoke Oduwole.

== Mandate and operations ==
=== Enabling Business Environment Secretariat (EBES) ===
The Enabling Business Environment Secretariat (EBES) is the administrative arm of the PEBEC; working with various Ministries, Departments and Agencies (MDAs) to implement the reform agenda of the PEBEC. They enforce the reformation and carry out the mandate through home grown internationally recognized methodologies and frameworks.

=== Reportgov ===
Reportgov is Nigeria’s Official Public Service Complaint website for complaints and feedback for the service of any Ministry, Department, and Agency of the government of the Federal Republic of Nigeria. ReportGov has since been digitized into a mobile app that makes it easy for citizens to resolve issues encountered when dealing with Government Agencies.

== PEBEC Programs ==
=== Business Made Easy LITuation Tour ===
The Business Made Easy LITuation Tour had the stated goal of collaborating more closely with the audience as stakeholders in delivering reforms to transform Nigeria’s business landscape for better.

Jumoke Oduwole said "The objective of the tour is anchored on the acronym “L.I.T”, which means Listen, Implement, Track." "The tour stopped in Imo (South-East), Ekiti (South-West), Akwa Ibom (South-South), Kwara (North-Central), FCT (North- Central) and the Northwest."

=== National Action Plan (NAP) ===
The National Action Plan contains initiatives and actions to be implemented by responsible Ministries, Department and Agencies (MDAs), the National Assembly, the Government of Lagos and Kano states, as well as some private sector stakeholders within a stipulated 60 days period. This initiative has been running from 2017.
