= Muhammad Mamman Nami =

Nigerian accountant and tax administrator

Executive Chairman, Federal Inland Revenue Service
- In office November 2019 – 14 September 2023
- Preceded by: Babatunde Fowler
- Succeeded by: Zaccheus Adedeji

Personal details
- Born: 2 February 1968 (age 58) Nami, Niger State, Nigeria
- Education: Bayero University Kano (B.A (Hon) Sociology) Ahmadu Bello University, Zaria (MBA)
- Occupation: Accountant, tax administrator

Muhammad Mamman Nami (born 2 February 1968) is a Nigerian accountant, management professional, tax administrator and public officer. He is the immediate past Executive Chairman of Nigeria's Federal Inland Revenue Service FIRS, the agency responsible for assessing, collecting and accounting for tax and other revenues accruing to the Federal Government of Nigeria. He has almost three decades of practical working experience in auditing, tax management and advisory and management services to clients in the banking, manufacturing services and public sectors as well as non-profit organizations.

== Early life and education ==
Nami was born in Nami village, Agaie Local Government Area of Niger State. He attended Jipo LEA Primary School and thereafter proceeded to the Government Secondary School, Suleja. Nami obtained a bachelor's degree in sociology from Bayero University Kano in 1991 and a Masters of Business degree from Ahmadu Bello University, Zaria in 2014. He is a fellow of the Chartered Institute of Taxation of Nigeria, Institute of Debt Recovery Practitioners of Nigeria and Associate Member of Nigerian Institute of Management (Chartered) and Association of National Accountants of Nigeria.

== Career ==
Nami started his career with PKF International in 1993 and rose to the position of a senior consultant in charge of tax management and advisory services. He joined KEL Group of Companies as General Manager from 2004 to 2006; and later with the Mainstream Energy Solutions Ltd as a Statutory Board Audit Committee Member. In 2018, he founded Manam Professional Services (Chartered Tax Practitioners and Business Advisers) based in Kaduna, Abuja, and Niger State.

In 2017, Nami was appointed by President Muhammadu Buhari as a member of the Audit Committee on Recoveries – a committee set up to recover loot in Nigeria. As of September 2018, the committee said it had recovered about $2 billion. Nami is a Fellow of Chartered Institute of Taxation of Nigeria, Chartered Institute of Forensic and Investigation Professionals of Nigeria, Institute of Debt Recovery Practitioners of Nigeria and Associate Member of Nigerian Institute of Management (Chartered) and Association of National Accountants of Nigeria. Muhammad Nami also served on many companies' Board and Statutory Board Audit Committees. He was appointed as a member of the Presidential Committee on Audit of Recovered Stolen Assets in November, 2017 by President Muhammadu Buhari.

== Chairman of FIRS ==
Nami was appointed Executive Chairman of the Federal Inland Revenue Service FIRS in 2019 by President Muhammadu Buhari, after the expiration of the five-year tenure of Babatunde Fowler. When he appeared before the Senate, Nami told Senators that his qualifications have put him "in good stead".
