= Jumoke Oduwole =

Nigerian jurist and academic (born 1973)

Dr Jumoke Oduwole
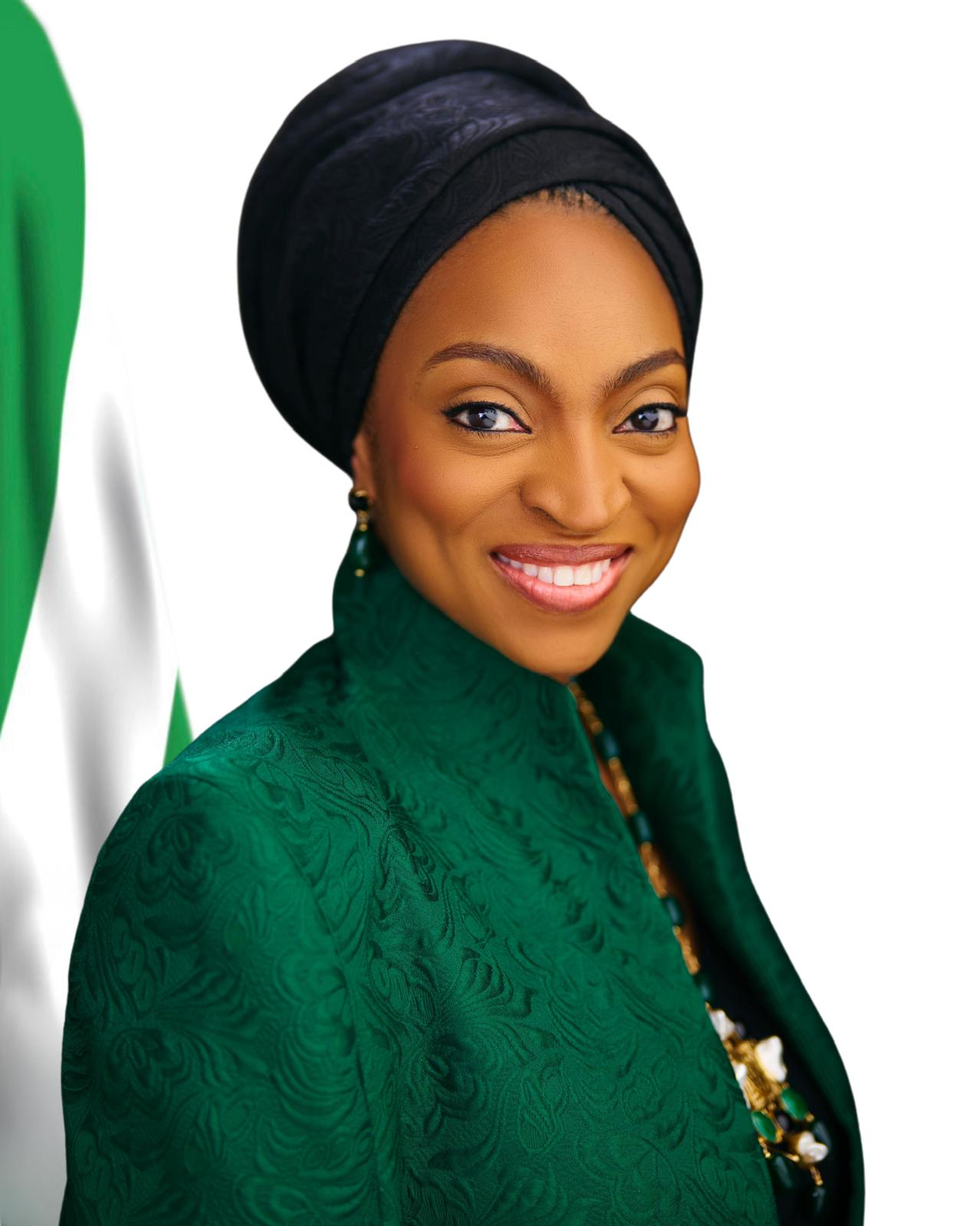

Minister of Industry, Trade and Investment
- Incumbent
- Assumed office 4 November 2024
- President: Bola Tinubu
- Preceded by: Doris Uzoka-Anite

Senior Special Assistant to the President on Industry, Trade & Investment
- In office November 2015 – May 2019
- President: Muhammadu Buhari

Special Adviser to the President on Ease of Doing Business
- In office August 2019 – May 2023
- President: Muhammadu Buhari

Personal details
- Born: 23 September 1973 (age 53) Lagos, Nigeria
- Education: University of Lagos (LL.B) University of Cambridge (LL.M.) Stanford University (MSc)
- Occupation: Jurist, Public Servant
- Awards: Order of the Niger

Olajumoke Omoniyi Oduwole, MFR (born 23 September 1973) is a Nigerian jurist and the current Minister of Industry, Trade and Investment. She was the Prince Claus Chair holder from 2013 to 2015.

== Early life and education ==
Jumoke Oduwole, MFR, was born in Lagos State, Nigeria. She studied law at the University of Lagos, graduating in 1998. Oduwole was called to the Nigerian Bar the following year. She later pursued postgraduate studies abroad, earning a master’s degree in commercial law from the University of Cambridge in 2000 on a DFID–Cambridge Commonwealth Trust scholarship. In 2007, she completed a master’s degree in international legal studies at Stanford University, where she also held a graduate fellowship at the Center on International Conflict and Negotiation.

From 2008 to 2010, she served as a visiting scholar at the University of Houston Law Center, Houston, Texas, US and obtained her doctorate in international trade and development from Stanford Law School. Oduwole previously served as co-president of the Stanford Alumni Club of Nigeria and was a member of the executive committee of the Oxford and Cambridge (Oxbridge) Club of Nigeria. In 2023, she was appointed as a senior fellow at Harvard University's Kennedy School of Government in Massachusetts, US. Oduwole has held two street photography exhibitions in the Netherlands and one in Lagos. She is married and has two children.

== Career ==
Oduwole MFR is the current (2026) Minister of Industry, Trade, and Investment of Nigeria. She was appointed as the Special Adviser to President Bola Ahmed Tinubu on the Presidential Enabling Business Environment Council (PEBEC) and Investment. She had served in former President Buhari's administration from November 2015 to May 2023 as Senior Special Assistant to the President on Industry, Trade, and Investment, and later as Special Adviser to the President on Ease of Doing Business. She and her team implemented over 200 reforms across various government levels, according to official reports. She contributed to the conceptualization and establishment of the Nigerian Office for Trade Negotiations (NOTN). She was a member of the Technical Working Group of the Presidential Committee for the Impact and Readiness Assessment of the African Continental Free Trade Area (AfCFTA) (Sub-Committee on Ease of Doing Business) and is a member of Nigeria's AfCFTA Implementation National Action Committee (NAC).

Oduwole has served on several specialized reform committees, including the AfCFTA Implementation Committee and the Tax Policy Reform Committee. She chaired the Technical Working Team on Legislative Imperatives for the implementation of the National Development Plan (NDP) 2021–2025. As Executive Secretary and Executive Member of the Presidential Enabling Business Environment Council (PEBEC), she oversees the Secretariat’s activities aimed at improving Nigeria’s business environment.

Her contributions to reform efforts were recognized with the Member of the Order of the Federal Republic (MFR) honor in 2023. In September 2024, she was awarded a "Hall of Fame" recognition by The Most Influential People of African Descent (MIPAD) for her work in business climate reforms from 2015 to 2024.

Oduwole was named one of the Most Influential People of African Descent (MIPAD) Class of 2024 Global Top 100 Export and International Trade Edition in May 2024 and was appointed as a Senior Fellow at Harvard University's Kennedy School of Government Mossavar-Rahmani Center for Business and Government. In August 2022, she was invited to serve as a Governance Advisor to the Massachusetts Institute of Technology (MIT) Gov/Lab Governance Innovation Initiative. In September 2022, she was selected as a member of the 6th cohort of the Africa Leadership Institute, West Africa (ALIWA), part of the Aspen Global Leadership Network (AGLN).

Since 2016, Oduwole has been on loan to the Federal Government of Nigeria from the Department of Jurisprudence and International Law, Faculty of Law, University of Lagos, Nigeria. Since 2004, she has taught various subjects at undergraduate and postgraduate levels, including International Economic Law, International Trade Law, Law of the Sea, Diplomatic and Consular Law, Law of Banking and Negotiable Instruments, Law of Contract, Law of Taxation, Business Law, and Commercial Transactions. Her research has focused on International Economic Law, Economic Development in Africa, and the African Continental Free Trade Area (AfCFTA). Oduwole was a two-term elected member of the University of Lagos Senate. Prior to her career in academia, Oduwole led a corporate banking unit in the telecommunications sector team at Guaranty Trust Bank Plc's Corporate Banking Group. From 2000 to 2003, she was an investment banker with FCMB Capital Markets, a division of FCMB Plc, and worked on some Capital Raising, Mergers and Acquisitions, and Privatisation transactions for local and multinational clients.

From 2013–2015, Oduwole was the Prince Claus Chair holder, a Visiting Professorship in Development and Equity in honor of the late Prince Claus of The Netherlands, conferred by the Curatorium (then) chaired by H.M. Queen Maxima of the Netherlands. She has spoken at the Harvard Africa Business and Public Policy Conferences in March 2022 and 2023, the World Bank Group Spring Meetings 2023, the MIT Africa Innovate Conference in April 2022, and as a member of Nigeria's 2022 delegation to the United Nations General Assembly (UNGA). She has spoken at the World Economic Forum on Africa, International Centre for Trade and Sustainable Development (ICTSD), Office of the High Commissioner for Human Rights (OHCHR), Geneva, the European Union Commission, Brussels, and the International Criminal Court, The Hague, among others. She contributed to an article in The Futures Report – "Making the AfCFTA work for Women and Youth" jointly published by the African Union's AfCFTA Secretariat and the UNDP in 2020.

Oduwole is a member of the Board of Trustees of the Mandela Institute for Development Studies (MINDS), an Africa-wide think tank on governance, economic development and the evolution of African institutions, and was previously on the Board of Ecobank Nigeria Plc, and Positive Action for Treatment Access (PATA), an HIV support organization. She is a 2013 Archbishop Desmond Tutu Fellow of the African Leadership Institute and is one of 15 women leaders selected from across the African continent who formed the inaugural cohort of President Ellen Johnson Sirleaf's "Amujae Initiative" in 2020.

Oduwole founded the No Limits Nigeria Initiative (NLNI) in 2023, an organization focused on promoting young people to engage in nation-building. She has received awards such as the Sir Ahmadu Bello Platinum Leadership Award (2022) and the Enterprising Women Awards (2022). In 2019, she received an Africa Leadership Network (ALN) Women 10th Anniversary Recognition for the impact of her work on business climate reforms.

Oduwole graduated from the University of Lagos with a second-class upper LL.B. degree in law in 1998 and was called to the Nigerian Bar in 1999. She obtained an LL.M. degree (second-class upper) with a focus in Commercial Law from Cambridge University, England, in 2000, where she was a DFID Cambridge Commonwealth Trust Scholar. In 2007, Oduwole received a second master's degree in International Legal Studies from Stanford University, USA, and was a Graduate Fellow at the Stanford Center on International Conflict and Negotiation (SCICN) from 2007 to 2008. She was a visiting scholar at the University of Houston Law Center, Houston, Texas, USA, from 2008 to 2010 and obtained her doctorate degree in International Trade and Development in 2011 from Stanford Law School.

== Publications ==
- Jumoke Oduwole, 'Nothing Ventured, Nothing Gained? A Case Study of Africa's Participation in WTO Dispute Settlement', Int. J. Private Law, Vol. 2, No. 4, 2009. pp. 358–370 (Switzerland).
- Jumoke Oduwole, 'WTO Doha Round Agriculture Negotiations: The ‘Development Component’ and Africa', Sauti: Stanford Journal of African Studies, Volume VI ~ 2009/10 pp. 16–25 (USA).
- Jumoke Oduwole, 'An Appraisal Of Developing Country Coalition Strategy In The WTO Doha Round Agriculture Negotiations', Currents: International Trade Law Journal, South Texas College of Law, (Summer 2012) pp. 45–52. (USA).
- Jumoke Oduwole, 'Developing Countries and Consensus-Based Decision-Making In The WTO: The Doha Experience', Journal of International Law and Diplomacy, Vol. 1:1, 2013 pp. 75–101 (Nigeria).
- Jumoke Oduwole, 'WTO Special and Differential Treatment: Africa's Golden Fleece or Trojan Horse?' SADC Law Journal, 2013 vol. 3, Issue 1 pp. 59–79 fall 2013 (South Africa).
- Jumoke Oduwole, 'International Trade Dispute Remedies: How Equitable for Africa?' Vol. 32 Journal of Private and Property Law pp. 92–105 (2014) (Nigeria).
- Jumoke Oduwole, 'A Critical Analysis of the Non-Participation of African Countries in the WTO Dispute Settlement Mechanism' Vol 20 African Yearbook of International Law/Annuaire Africain de droit international (2013-2014) pp. 157–89 [Special volume in honour of 80th birthday of Professor Georges Abi-Saab] (The Netherlands).
- Jumoke Oduwole, African Participation at the World Trade Organization - Legal and Institutional Aspects, 1995-2010 (Author: Joan Apecu Laker; Publisher: Martinus Nijhoff; Year of Publication: 2014; ISBN 978-90-04-25670-5) (The Netherlands).
- Jumoke Oduwole, 'An Evaluation of Africa's Contribution to the Implementation of the Right to Development in International Law', in Shielding Humanity: Essays in Honour of Judge Abdul Koroma, International Court of Justice from 1994 to 2012, Charles Jalloh and Olufemi Elias (eds) pp 565–90 (Brill 2015) (The Netherlands) (Book chapter).
- Jumoke Oduwole, International Law and the Right to Development: A Pragmatic Approach for Africa, Inaugural Lecture Monograph, Prince Claus Chair in Development and Equity, International Institute of Social Studies, Erasmus University Rotterdam, ISBN 978-94-91478-22-2 2014 pp. 1–44 (The Netherlands).
- Jumoke Oduwole, The ECOWAS Common External Tariff and Nigeria in Law and Practice of Indirect Taxes In Nigeria, Abiola Sanni (ed.), (Chartered Institute of Taxation of Nigeria, 2014) pp. 233–364. (Book chapter).
- Jumoke Oduwole, 'Human Rights, International Norms and Transnational Corporations: The story so far'. Vol. 1 Journal of Public Law [2013] pp. 65–81 (Nigeria).

== Awards and honours ==
In 2023, Oduwole was given the national award of Officer of the Order of the Niger (OON), the second-highest national award in Niger, by President Muhammadu Buhari.

== Bibliography ==
- Mrs. Olajumoke Omoniyi Oduwole (2011). Realigning International Trade Negotiation Asymmetry: Developing Country Coalition Strategy in the WTO Doha Round Agriculture Negotiations. Stanford University. STANFORD:ps629hb2783.
