= Anthony Ani =

Nigerian politician

Minister of State for Foreign Affairs
- In office 1993–1998
- President: Sani Abacha

Minister of Finance
- In office 1994–1998
- Preceded by: Kalu Idika Kalu
- Succeeded by: Ismaila Usman

Personal details
- Born: 6 July 1936 (age 90)

Etubom Anthony Ani was the Minister of Foreign Affairs and Finance Minister of Nigeria from 1994 to 1998 during the Sani Abacha regime. He hails from Odukpani local government area of Cross River State in southern Nigeria.

He is also a former chairman of KPMG, former President of the Institute of Chartered Accountants of Nigeria (ICAN). Chief Ani, is the Clan Head of Mbiabo Ikoneto in Cross River State, in the Niger Delta region of Nigeria. He was a career accountant who was appointed by General Sani Abacha as Minister of state for Foreign Affairs in 1993 and was subsequently appointed the Minister of finance in 1994.
