= Doris Uzoka-Anite =

Nigerian politician and doctor (born 1981)

- Uzoka-Anite in 2024

Minister of State for Budget and Economic Planning
- Incumbent
- Assumed office 3 March 2026
- President: Bola Tinubu

Minister of State for Finance
- In office 2 November 2024 – 3 March 2026
- President: Bola Tinubu
- Succeeded by: Taiwo Oyedele

Minister of Industry, Trade and Investment
- In office 21 August 2023 – 23 October 2024
- President: Bola Tinubu
- Preceded by: Niyi Adebayo
- Succeeded by: Jumoke Oduwole

Personal details
- Born: Doris Nkiruka Uzoka; 16 October 1973 (age 53) Oguta, Imo State, Nigeria
- Party: All Progressives Congress
- Education: University of Benin
- Occupation: Politician; banker; medical doctor

Doris Nkiruka Uzoka-Anite (born 16 October 1973) is a Nigerian politician, medical doctor and financial analyst. She served as Minister of Industry, Trade and Investment of Nigeria between August 2023 and October 2024. She is the Nigerian Minister of State for Finance, a position she assumed in November 2, 2024.

== Early life and education ==
Doris Nkiruka Uzoka was born on 16 October 1973 in Orsu-Obodo, Oru Clan, Oguta, Imo State, Nigeria. She had her education in the medical field at the University of Benin and became a qualified medical doctor in 1999. Subsequently, she earned the Chartered Financial Analyst (CFA) certification.

== Career ==
Uzoka-Anite started her career in banking at the Zenith Bank Corporate Social Responsibility (CSR) unit then headed the Human Resources and Training department. In 2011, she changed to Treasury, and was later named the bank's treasurer in 2017.

=== Government career ===
In March 2021, she was appointed Commissioner for Finance and Co-ordinator of the Economy in Imo State by Governor Hope Uzodinma. Following his victory in the 2023 presidential election, she was one of 28 ministerial nominees nominated by President Bola Tinubu sent to the Senate for screening.

She was formally inaugurated on Monday, 21 August 2023 as Minister for Industry, Trade and Investment of the by President Tinubu.

== Personal life ==
Her mother, Victoria Uzoka, died in July 2024.
