= Finance Minister of Nigeria =

Ministry

Minister of Finance of Nigeria
- Incumbent; Taiwo Oyedele since 21 April 2026
- Federal Ministry of Finance
- Style: Mr. Minister (informal); The Honorable (formal)
- Member of: Federal Executive Council
- Reports to: The president
- Seat: Abuja
- Appointer: The president
- Formation: 1960
- First holder: Festus Okotie-Eboh
- Website: osgf.gov.ng

The minister of finance of Nigeria is a senior cabinet official in the Nigerian Federal Executive Council. The finance minister directs the Nigerian Ministry of Finance and ensures that it operates in a transparent, accountable and efficient manner to bolster the country's economic development priorities. The minister is assisted by the permanent secretary of the Ministry of Finance, a career civil servant. The current Nigerian minister of finance is Taiwo Oyedele appointed by President Bola Tinubu on 21 April 2026.

== Duties of the minister ==
- Preparation of annual budgetary estimates of revenue and expenditure for the Federal Government.
- Determination of Federal Government fiscal policies.
- Mobilization of domestic and external financial resources for national development purposes.
- Management of foreign exchange reserves.
- Management of Federal Government revenue.
- Currency valuation.
- Regulation of the insurance industry
- Revenue allocation management.

== Ministers of finance ==
Head of government	Name	Term
Sir Abubakar Tafawa Balewa	Festus Okotie-Eboh	1960–1966
Johnson Aguiyi-Ironsi Yakubu Gowon	Obafemi Awolowo	1967–1971
Johnson Aguiyi-Ironsi Yakubu Gowon	Shehu Shagari	1971–1975
Murtala Muhammed Olusegun Obasanjo	Asumoh Ete Ekukinam	1976–1977
Olusegun Obasanjo	James Oluleye	1977–1979
Shehu Shagari	Sunday Essang	1979–1983
Muhammadu Buhari	Onaolapo Soleye	1984–1985
Ibrahim Babangida	Kalu Idika Kalu	1985–1986
Ibrahim Babangida	Chu Okongwu	1986–1990
Ibrahim Babangida	Olu Falae	1990–1990
Ibrahim Babangida	Abubakar Alhaji	1990–1993
Ernest Shonekan	Aminu Saleh	1993–1993
Sani Abacha	Kalu Idika Kalu	1993–1994
Sani Abacha	Anthony Ani	1994–1998
Abdulsalami Abubakar	Ismaila Usman	August 1998 – May 1999
Olusegun Obasanjo	Adamu Ciroma	June 1999 – May 2003
Olusegun Obasanjo	Ngozi Okonjo-Iweala	15 July 2003 – 21 June 2006
Olusegun Obasanjo	Nenadi Usman	July 2006 – May 2007
Umaru Musa Yar'Adua	Shamsuddeen Usman	June 2007 – 17 December 2008
Umaru Musa Yar'Adua	Mansur Mukhtar	17 December 2008 – 17 March 2010
Goodluck Jonathan	Olusegun Olutoyin Aganga	6 April 2010 – June 2011
Goodluck Jonathan	Ngozi Okonjo-Iweala	17 August 2011 – 29 May 2015
Muhammadu Buhari	Kemi Adeosun	11 November 2015 – 14 September 2018
Muhammadu Buhari	Zainab Ahmed	14 September 2018 – 29 May 2023
Bola Tinubu	Wale Edun	21 August 2023 – 21 April 2026
Bola Tinubu	Taiwo Oyedele	21 April 2026 – present

== See also ==
- Nigerian Ministry of Finance
- Federal Ministries of Nigeria

== Sources ==
- Official Website - Federal Ministry of Finance
- Current Minister of Finance
