= Ismaila Usman =

Nigerian politician

Finance Minister of Nigeria
- In office August 1998 – June 1999
- President: Abdulsalami Abubakar
- Preceded by: Anthony Ani
- Succeeded by: Adamu Ciroma

Ismaila Usman was the Finance Minister of Nigeria from 1998 to 1999. He was suspended by General Sani Abacha as the deputy governor of the Central Bank of Nigeria, but was appointed by Abdulsalami Abubakar to oversee the federal ministry of Finance.
