= Abubakar Alhaji =

Nigerian diplomat and politician (1936/1937–2026)

Abubakar Alhaji (1936 or 1937 – 30 July 2026) was a Nigerian diplomat and politician who was the Minister of Planning and Finance. He later held the title of Sardauna of Sokoto. Alhaji was a long-serving permanent secretary who worked with various Nigerian administrations.

== Early life and education ==
Alhaji was born to the family of Muhammed Sani also known as Alhaji Alhaji because he was born on the day of Sallah and went on a pilgrimage to Mecca. Alhaji attended a secondary school in Kano before transferring to Katsina Government College. He later attended Bournemouth College of Commerce and the University of Reading, Berkshire earning a degree in political economy. Alhaji took courses at the Hague Institute of Social Services and the IMF Institute, Washington.

== Career ==
Alhaji joined the Nigerian civil service in 1964 and was an assistant secretary in the Federal Ministry of Finance in the late 1960s. After attending a course in The Hague, he was briefly posted to the Ministry of Industries where he became a principal assistant secretary. In 1971, he was posted back to the Ministry of Finance. In 1975, he became a permanent secretary in the Federal Ministry of Trade and was in the ministry till 1978. In 1979, he was posted to the Finance Ministry as the permanent secretary. In his role at the Finance Ministry, he was involved in managing Nigeria's relationship with its external creditors and was on the Nigerian negotiating team for the Lomé II agreement. Alhaji was later posted to the Ministry of Planning before Babangida upgraded his position as Minister of State, Budget and Planning in 1988. Between 1990 and 1991, he was the Minister of Finance. In the mid-1990s, he was the country's High Commissioner to the United Kingdom.

== Personal life and death ==
Alhaji was turbaned Sardauna in 1990, the previous title holder, Ahmadu Bello had died in 1966. He was the elder brother of the late Aliyu Dasuki who was raised by Ibrahim Dasuki.

Alhaji died in Abuja on 30 July 2026, at the age of 89.
