= Sunday Essang =

Former finance minister of Nigeria

Minister of Finance
- In office 1979–1983
- Preceded by: James Oluleye
- Succeeded by: Onaolapo Soleye

Personal details
- Born: 24 December 1940 (age 85) Cross River state, Nigeria
- Education: University of Ibadan: University of Michigan
- Profession: Lecturer; public servant

Sunday Matthew Essang (born 24 December 1940) was the Finance Minister of the Federal Republic of Nigeria during the Nation's 2nd republic (1979 to 1983).

== Early life and education ==
Essang was born on 24 December 1940, in Oron, a city in Cross-River state, Nigeria. Essang attended King's College, Lagos. He received a B.Sc. Economics degree from the University of Ibadan in 1964. Essang went on to receive his master's degree and Doctorate degrees from the University of Michigan, US.

== Career ==
Essang was the Head of the Department of Economics in the University of Calabar from 1976 to 1979 before he was appointed into office. He was also the Dean of the Faculty of Social Sciences at the University of Calabar. Essang was appointed the Minister of Finance during the Shehu Shagari administration (1979–1983).

== Publications ==
Book Title	ISBN	Year Published	Pages
International Economics	978-2063-47-9	2001	251
Intermediate Economic Analysis	9781270209 9789781270208	1974	251
Nigeria's foreign trade and economic growth, 1948-1964	9781541032 9789781541032 0195754603 9780195754605	1982	128
