= Onaolapo Soleye =

Nigerian scholar and politician (1933–2023)

Minister of Finance
- In office 1984–1985
- Preceded by: Sunday Essang
- Succeeded by: Kalu Idika Kalu

Personal details
- Born: 11 November 1933 Abeokuta, Colony and Protectorate of Nigeria
- Died: 15 November 2023 (aged 90)
- Education: Baptist Boys' High School, Nigeria London School of Economics and Political Science, UK University of Manchester, US
- Profession: Politician Public Servant

Onaolapo Soleye (11 November 1933 – 15 November 2023) was a Nigerian scholar and politician who served as Minister of Finance during the military regime of General Muhammadu Buhari. He served for twenty months as the minister of finance. He was also a commissioner for Finance and Industry in Ogun State, and sat on the board of the Obasanjo Presidential Library.

== Education ==
Soleye attended Baptist Boys' High School, Abeokuta, one of the earliest secondary schools established in Nigeria. He trained as a sociologist and studied at the London School of Economics and Political Science and University of Manchester.

Soleye's major policy actions during his tenure as Minister of Finance include:

- Policies preventing drastic devaluation of the naira
- Refinancing of trade debt arrears insured by international organizations
- Supported the rationalization and restriction of imports
- Did not stop the trend of budget deficit financing
- Creating of new naira notes to halt currency smuggling

== Career ==
Soleye was a lecturer at the university of Ibadan. He was also the commissioner of industry in the western region before he was appointed the minister of finance.

Soleye preferred administrative controls on foreign exchange; he rejected proposals to drastically devalue the naira. He also decided to print new notes in April 1984, to prevent the repatriation of naira through smuggling.

== Death ==
Onaolapo Soleye died on 15 November 2023, four days after his 90th birthday.

== Sources ==
- "Obasanjo Farms Withdraws From Okitipupa Oil Palm Board", Daily Trust, 21 January 2002
