= Hameem Nuhu Sanusi =

Emir of Dutse

Muhammad Hamim Nuhu Sanusi
- Emir of Dutse
- Born: 26 February 1979 (age 47); Kano

Muhammad Hamim Nuhu Sanusi CFR (born 26 February 1979), is a Nigerian monarch who is the current Emir of Dutse, the capital city of Jigawa State in the Northern Nigeria. He was appointed as the 22nd Emir of Dutse in 2024, following the death of his father, Nuhu Muhammadu Sanusi, who was the 21st Emir of Dutse He spent his early years in Kano State before relocating to Jigawa in 1995, following his father's ascension to the position of Emir of Dutse.

== Early life and education ==
Muhammad Hameem Nuhu Sunusi's educational journey began in Kano, where he attended Kano Capital School and later Airforce Primary School for his nursery and primary education. He continued his secondary education at Crescent International and later graduated from Federal Government College Kano. Following his basic education, he pursued higher studies abroad, earning both a first degree and a master's degree from a Malaysian university. In 2006, he completed the National Youth Service Corps (NYSC) at the National Assembly in Abuja upon returning to Nigeria. He held the title Dan Iyan Dutse before he became Emir in 2023. He was awarded the National honor Commander of the Federal Republic (CFR) on 28 May 2023 by President Muhammadu Buhari.

== Career ==
Muhammad Hameem Nuhu Sunusi embarked on an entrepreneurial career initially but later transitioned into the field of engineering, a passion he had held for a long time. He Was the Head of business development at Bilyak Consulting from 2007 to 2011. He also worked with SMD Consulting from 2011 to 2016 as Head of the Northern Region before he finally became the managing director of HMS Energies Limited.
