= Zacch Adedeji =

Executive Chairman, Nigeria Revenue Service (born 1978)

Zacch Adelabu Adedeji
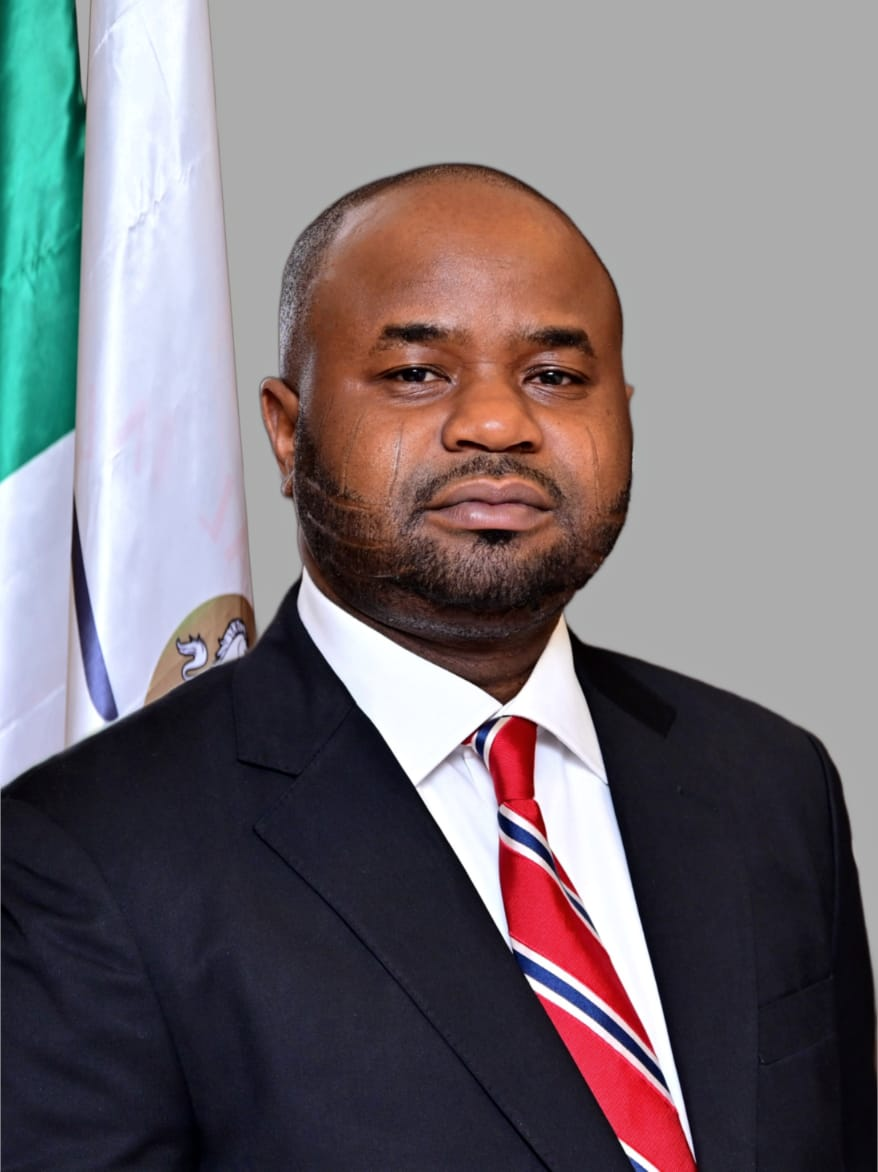
- Official portrait, 2023

Executive Chairman, Nigeria Revenue Service
- Incumbent
- Assumed office 2023
- Preceded by: Muhammad Mamman Nami

Personal details
- Born: January 8, 1978 (age 48) Ogbomoso, Oyo State, Nigeria
- Education: Obafemi Awolowo University (OAU)
- Occupation: Accountant; public officer

Zacch Adelabu Adedeji (born January 8, 1978) is a Nigerian accountant who is currently the Executive Chairman of the Nigeria Revenue Service. He previously was the Commissioner for Finance in Oyo State from June 2011 to May 2015.

== Early life and education ==
Adedeji was born on January 8, 1978, in Ogbomosho, Oyo State. He holds a National Diploma in Accountancy from the Federal Polytechnic, Ede, Osun State. He then pursued a Bachelor of Science degree in Management & Accounting at Obafemi Awolowo University (OAU), Ile-Ife, Osun State, where he graduated with a First-Class honor.

Adedeji obtained a Master of Science degree in Accounting from OAU. He later attended the Harvard Kennedy School of Government in the United States where he completed an Executive Course in Economic Development. In 2023, Adedeji earned a Doctor of Philosophy in Accounting from Obafemi Awolowo University, Ile-Ife.

== Career ==
Adedeji's career began with a managerial position at the multinational corporation Procter and Gamble (P&G). He held other roles at P&G, including Corporate Finance Manager (West Africa) and Finance Leader for SAP Implementation Project.

He was appointed as the Commissioner for Finance, Oyo State by then–Governor of Oyo State, Abiola Ajimobi from 2011 to 2015. He was later appointed as the Executive Secretary of National Sugar Development Council (NSDC) during the administration of President Muhammadu Buhari. In the roll, he established the Nigeria Sugar Institute.

In September 2023, he was appointed by President Bola Ahmed Tinubu as the Executive Chairman of Federal Inland Revenue Service (FIRS), the agency responsible for assessing, collecting, and accounting for taxes accruing to the Federal Government of Nigeria. Before his appointment as Executive Chairman of FIRS, Adedeji also served as the Special Adviser to the President on Revenue.
