= Senas Ukpanah =

Nigerian businessman

Senas John Ukpanah is a Nigerian administrator and businessman. A former university lecturer, he transferred services to become a civil servant in the Southeastern State which became Cross River. He retired from the civil service in 1987 as a permanent secretary. Thereafter, he went into private business until his appointment as Federal Minister of Trade and Tourism in 1989, he was later appointed National Planning minister in 1992.

Ukpanah is a former chairman of the Akwa Ibom Industrial Promotion Commission.
