= Aminu Saleh =

Nigerian administrator

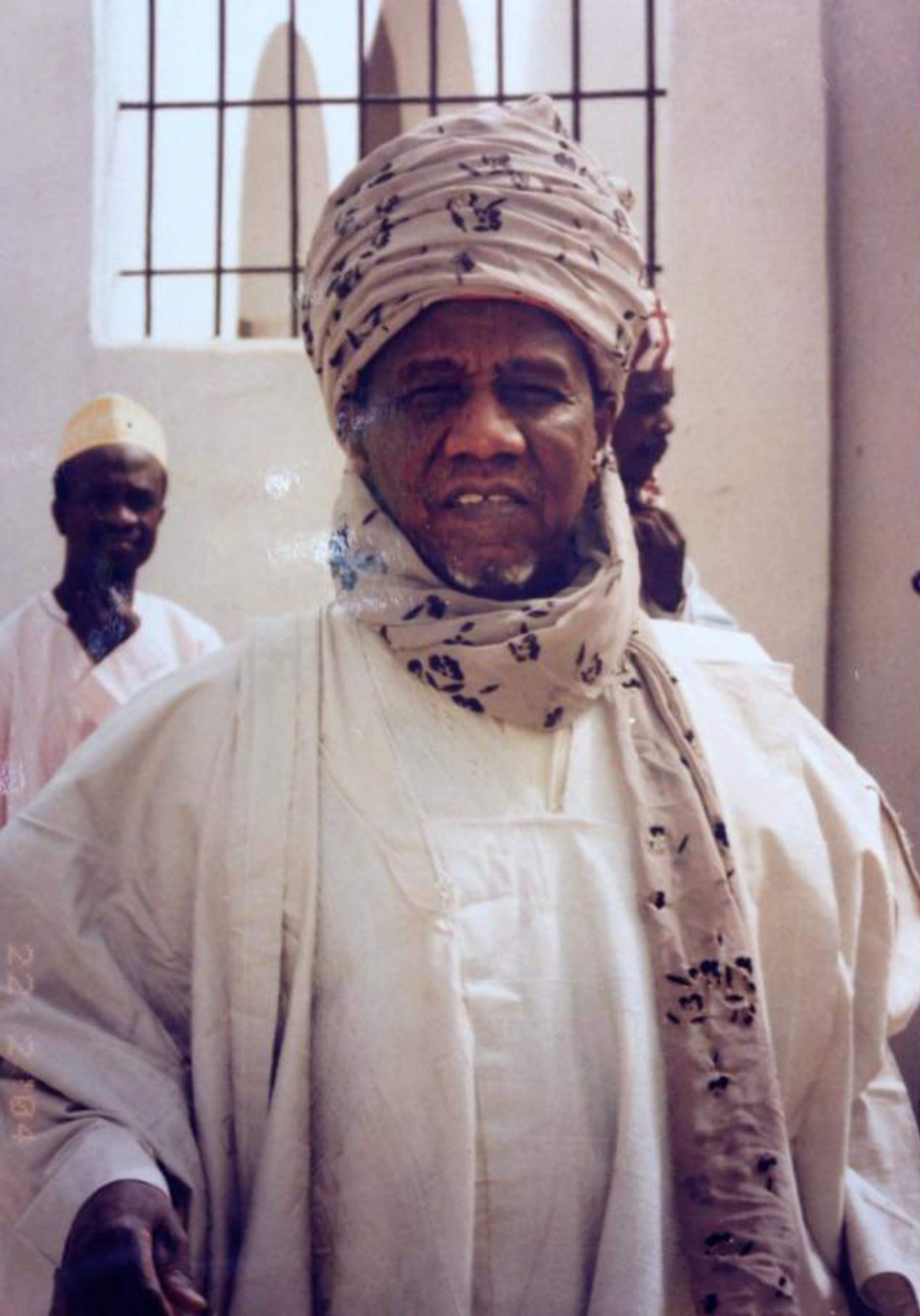

Secretary to the Government of the Federation
- In office 18 November 1993 – 17 October 1995
- President: Sani Abacha
- Preceded by: Mustafa Umara
- Succeeded by: Gidado Idris

Personal details
- Born: 6 November 1933 Azare, Northern Nigeria, British Nigeria (now Azare, Katagum, Bauchi State, Nigeria
- Died: 22 July 2015 (aged 81) Azare, Katagum, Bauchi State, Nigeria

Aminu Saleh GCON CFR (6 November 1933 – 22 July 2015) was a Nigerian administrator, former Secretary to the Government of the Federation, former Finance Minister of Nigeria, and permanent secretary in the Nigerian ministry of Defense. He became the chairman of the National Qu'ranic Recitation Committee in 2006.

He is an indigene of Bauchi State and has served in various capacities at both the state and the federal level. He served Obasanjo's regime in the 1970s and Abacha's beginning in 1993.

Saleh is also the owner of a Nigerian beverage known as "Brahma and Tandi Guarana" and a shareholder in various Nigeria-based industries. He led the creation, establishment, funding and running of the Petroleum Trust Fund (PTF). He was a member of Vision 2010.

Born in 1933 in Azare, Katagum LGA, Bauchi State, Sale attended elementary school in Azare 1941-44, Bauchi middle school 1944-49, attended clerical training college Zaria, 1950-51 attended institute of administration Zaria for diploma in accounting 1956-57. He was on an evening university degree course in University of Lagos 1963-67, he had attended post graduate course in management in University of Wisconsin in the United States.

== Working experience ==
- He joined the Katagum Native Authority in 1949, and became Katagum Native Authority Treasurer in 1957, thereafter transferred to the Federal Government in 1962. He was under Dr. Pius Okigbo, the then Economic Adviser to the Prime Minister.
- His pupilage in budget and national planning techniques under Dr. Edwin Ogbu, the Permanent Secretary Federal Ministry of Finance who later became Nigeria's permanent representative to the United Nations.
- The rigorous drills he regularly had in financial discipline and management in the hands of Abdul Aziz Atta the Permanent Secretary Fed. Min. of Finance and later SGF.
- The induction he went through in contract negotiations, preparation and its administrative supervision under Engr. S.O. Williams Perm. Sec. Min. of Communication who later became the federal minister of Communication.

== Appointments held ==
- Secretary to the Government of the Federation
- Head of Federal Civil Service.
- Federal Minister of Industries
- Federal Minister of Finance
- Federal Minister of Defence
- Permanent Secretary in the Federal Ministry of Communication.
- Permanent Secretary in the Federal Ministry of Trade.
- Permanent Secretary in the Federal Ministry of Defence.
- Deputy Permanent Secretary in the Federal Ministry of Finance.
- Deputy Permanent Secretary in the Federal Ministry of Communication.
- Deputy Permanent Secretary in the Federal Ministry of Agriculture.

== Membership of Federal boards ==
- Member, Board of Governors, University College Hospital, Ibadan (UCH) Ibadan from 1963 - 1965.
- Member, Board of Governors, Lagos University Teaching Hospital, (LUTH) from 1966 - 1967.
- Member, Provisional Council, University of Lagos, from 1969 - 1970.

== Appointments at Bauchi State level ==
He was appointed

- Chairman, Elders Advisory Committee.
- Chairman, Committee on the Creation of Katagum State.
- Chairman, Committee on Kafin Zaki Dam, by the Bauchi State Government.
- Chairman, Bauchi State Constitution Review Committee.
- Member of National Honours and Merit Award Committee.

== Awards ==
He was awarded

- Commander of the Federal Republic (CFR).
- Grand Commander of the Order of the Niger (GCON).
- Doctorate degree (LLD), ATBU Bauchi.
- Grand Commander of the Nigerian Students by NANS.
- Prestigious Merit Award by NUBASS.

== Papers presented ==
He had presented many papers to a number of bodies such as

1. Paper presented to an induction course of Fed. Perm. Sec. and Directors General under the chairmanship of Prof. A A Adedeje, a paper on Budgeting the Nigerian Experience.
2. Presented a paper to annual conference of Nigerian Institute of Mechanical Engineers Kaduna on Energy Development.
3. Presented a paper at the 50th Anniversary of Katagum Student Association (KSA)
4. Presented a paper at the 2008 Annual Dinner of Nigerian Society of Engineers Bauchi.

== Death ==
He died on Wednesday, July 22, 2015 at the Federal Medical Centre, Azare due to a failed emergency surgery.
