= James Oluleye =

Nigerian Army general (1930–2009)

Major General James Oluleye

Federal Commissioner for Finance
- In office March 1977 – September 1979
- Preceded by: Shehu Shagari
- Succeeded by: Sunday Essang as Minister of Finance

Federal Commissioner for Establishment and Service Matters
- In office August 1975 – March 1977

General Officer Commanding 2nd Division, Nigerian Army
- In office June 1970 – July 1975
- Preceded by: Lt. Col G.S. Jalo
- Succeeded by: Maj-Gen. Martin Adamu

Personal details
- Born: 20 April 1930
- Died: 2 July 2009 (aged 79)
- Education: St Luke's College; Regular Officers Special Training School (Teshie); Mons Officer Cadet School

Military service
- Branch/service: Nigerian Army
- Years of service: 1959–79
- Rank: Major General
- Commands: 2nd Division Nigerian Army

James Oluleye (20 April 1930 – 2 July 2009) was a Nigerian Army major general who served as Federal Commissioner of Finance (1977–79), Federal Commissioner of Establishment and Service Matters (1975–77), and who commanded the Nigerian Army's 2nd Division from 1970 to 1975.

== Background and education ==
James Oluleye completed his primary education in 1946 and thereafter taught for two years at St. Michael's School, Ikoro-Ekiti, and for a year at Anglican Primary School, Araromi Ago-Owu near Ikira in Oyo State. He later attended Ibadan Archdeaconry Teacher Training College where he obtained his Teaching Certificates (Grades II and III).

== Military career ==
Oluleye enlisted in the Nigerian Military Force (which later became the Royal Nigerian Army in 1960) with the enlistment number NMF/1003 on 9 September 1959. He had his basic military training at the Regular Officers Special Training School, Teshie, Ghana from September 1959 to March 1960. He later underwent officer training at Mons Officer Cadet School, Aldershot, England in 1960. He was commissioned as a second lieutenant in the Nigerian Army on 6 January 1961. In 1967 Oluleye attended the Defence Services Staff College, India. Some of his military postings include:

- Chief mortar instructor at the Nigerian Military Training College, Kaduna (1963–1964)
- Officer commanding C Company, 1st Battalion, Enugu (1964–1966)
- Second-in-command 5th Battalion, Kano (March 1966 - September 1966)
- Acting commandant, Nigerian Military Training College (October 1966 - March 1967)
- GSO1 Army Headquarters (November 1967 - May 1970)
- General officer commanding, 2nd Division Ibadan (June 1970 - July 1975)

=== Activities during the Nigerian Army mutiny of July 1966 ===
Then Major Oluleye was second-in-command to Lt. Col Mohammed Shuwa at the 5th Battalion in Kano during the Nigerian Army Mutiny of July 1966 where many Igbo military officers were systematically murdered by their northern counterparts for what the northern soldiers perceived as retribution for the 15 January 1966 coup (which was led by mostly Igbo officers). Foreseeing the potential for large scale bloodshed, Major Oluleye asked his company commanders to lock up the battalion armory and to store the keys in his safe. As a result of Oluleye's leadership and foresight, many Igbo officers lives were spared in Kano during the July mutiny.

== Service as Federal Cabinet Minister ==
Oluleye served as Federal Commissioner for Establishment and Service Matters from August 1975 to March 1977 and was later posted to the Ministry of Finance where he served as Commissioner from March 1977 to September 1979. He retired from the Nigerian Army on 2 October 1979, following the handover of power from General Olusegun Obasanjo's administration to President Shehu Shagari's administration.

== Death ==
General Oluleye died on 2 July 2009.
