= Wale Edun =

Nigerian economist, investment banker and politician

Chief Wale Edun CVO
- Edun in 2023

Minister of Finance and Coordinating Minister of the Economy
- In office 21 August 2023 – 21 April 2026
- President: Bola Tinubu
- Preceded by: Zainab Ahmed
- Succeeded by: Taiwo Oyedele

Lagos State Commissioner of Finance
- In office 1999–2004
- Governor: Bola Tinubu
- Preceded by: Muhammed Ajibola Olagbaye
- Succeeded by: Ismail Adebayo Adewusi

Personal details
- Education: University of London; University of Sussex
- Occupation: Economist; investment banker; politician

Chief Adebayo Olawale Edun CVO, commonly known as Wale Edun, is a Nigerian economist, investment banker and politician who served as the minister of finance and coordinating minister of the economy from August 2023 to 21 April 2026. He was appointed the Chairman of the African Governors’ Forum of the World Bank in 2023. He is the first Nigerian to occupy this position in 60 years.

== Education ==
Edun holds bachelor's and master's degrees in economics from the University of London and the University of Sussex respectively.

== Career ==
From 1980 to 1986, Edun worked at Chase Merchant Bank (later Continental) in Lagos, Nigeria. He joined the World Bank in September 1986 through the elite Young Professionals program, where he worked on economic and financial packages for several countries in Latin America and the Caribbean. In 1989, he co-founded Investment Banking & Trust Company Limited (now Stanbic IBTC) and served as executive director. In 1994, he founded Denham Management Limited, which has since become the Chapelhill Denham Group; he served as chairman there from 2008 to 2021.

=== Political career ===
In 1999, he was appointed Lagos State commissioner of finance by then governor, Bola Tinubu, a position he held until 2004.

He was the chairman of the governing council and the board of trustees of the Trust Fund for the Hydrocarbon Pollution Remediation Project (HYPREP) for the implementation of the United Nations Environmental Report (UNEP) on Ogoniland.

On 16 August 2023, President Bola Tinubu appointed him minister of finance and coordinating minister of the economy. He was sworn in on 21 August 2023.

On 21 April 2026, President Bola Tinubu approved a minor cabinet reshuffle in which Edun was removed as Minister of Finance and Coordinating Minister of the Economy. He was succeeded by Taiwo Oyedele.

== Personal life and philanthropy ==
Himself a direct descendant of the Egba official Adegboyega Edun, Edun is married to Amy Adwoa Appiah, a daughter of the Ghanaian statesman Joe Appiah and his British wife Peggy Cripps, who was an author. One of their three sons is the British actor Adetomiwa Edun.

Edun is a board member and the Nigerian chair of the Duke of Edinburgh's International Award Foundation. He is chairman of Lagos Boxing Hall of Fame, a non-profit youth development organization that runs amateur boxing in Lagos. He is also the chairman of Livewell Initiative, a health-based NGO.
