= Babatunde Fowler =

Nigerian public officer

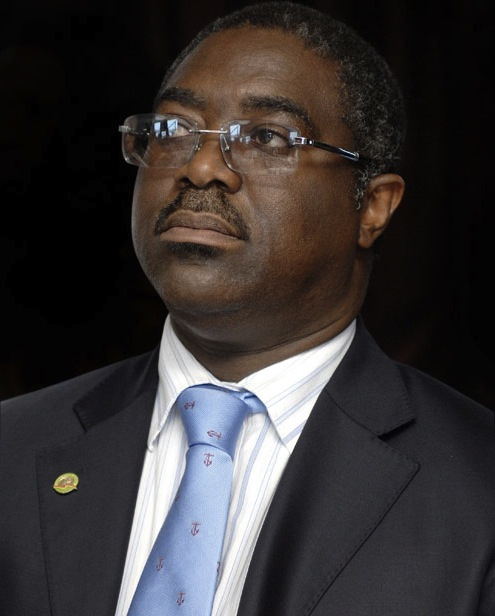
- Born: 12 August 1956 (age 69); Lagos, Lagos State, Nigeria
- Occupation: Tax administrator
- Spouse: Rosemary Fowler (m. 1982)

Babatunde Fowler (born 12 August 1956) is a Nigerian public officer, tax administrator and social reformer. He was the executive chairman of the Lagos State Board of Internal Revenue and chief executive officer of the Lagos State Internal Revenue Service. He is the former executive chairman of the Federal Inland Revenue Service (FIRS).

== Career ==
The Board of Internal Revenue became autonomous and self-accounting with the passage into law in January 2006 of the Lagos State Revenue Administration Law. Fowler was appointed as the first CEO of the Lagos State Internal Revenue Service and executive chairman of the Lagos State Board of Internal Revenue.

With this re-engineering, the new Lagos State Board of Internal Revenue has achieved a sharp increase in Internally Generated Revenue (IGR), from an average of ₦3.6 billion per month in January 2006, to an average of over ₦20.5 billion per month in 2014.

== Advocacy ==
Foweler advocates for less dependence on oil. The position was reiterated by him at an international conference where he warned the Federal Government of Nigeria that the "drastic drop in revenue had a negative impact on the balance in the federation account and by extension the amount accruing to the three tiers of government (in Nigeria) during the year 2009". In stimulating interest and raising awareness on tax education at an early stage in life, Fowler introduced a competition for pupils which is funded by his board in which winners are given cash awards and scholarships.
