= Biyi Afonja =

Nigerian academic and retired professor of statistics

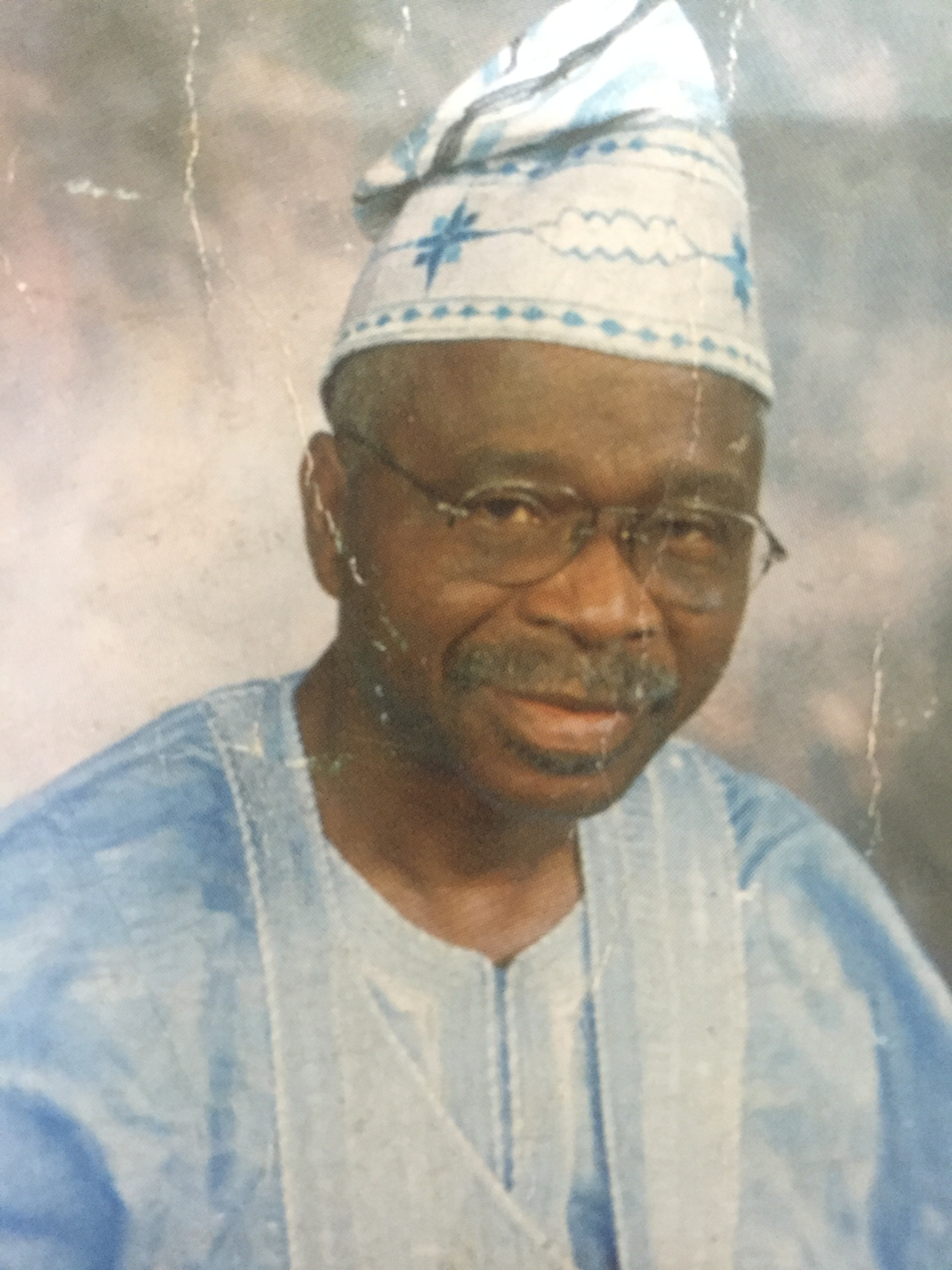
- Born: Yewa, Ogun State, Nigeria
- Education: University of Ibadan
- Occupations: Professor of Statistics, University of Ibadan
- Spouse: Yewande Sosanya

Biyi Afonja (born 1935) is a Nigerian academic and retired professor of Statistics at the Department of Statistics, University of Ibadan. He is the first Nigerian to be President of African Statistical Association.

== Education ==
He started his educational journey at All Saints' School, Araromi Orita then proceed to Government College, Ibadan for his secondary school. His higher education took him to The University College, Ibadan (now University of Ibadan, Nigeria) with a BSc degree in Mathematics, University of Aberdeen, Scotland with a Diploma in Statistics and University of Wisconsin, USA with a PhD in Statistics.

== Public roles and honours ==
He also served in various capacity as the Head, Department of Statistics, University of Ibadan, Oyo State, Commissioner for Education in the former Western State of Nigeria Chairman, National Advisory Council on Statistics Chairman, Governing Council, Ogun State College of Education and Pro-Chancellor Ogun State University, (Now Olabisi Onabanjo University, Ago Iwoye).
