= Dutse Emirate =

Emirate council in Jigawa State

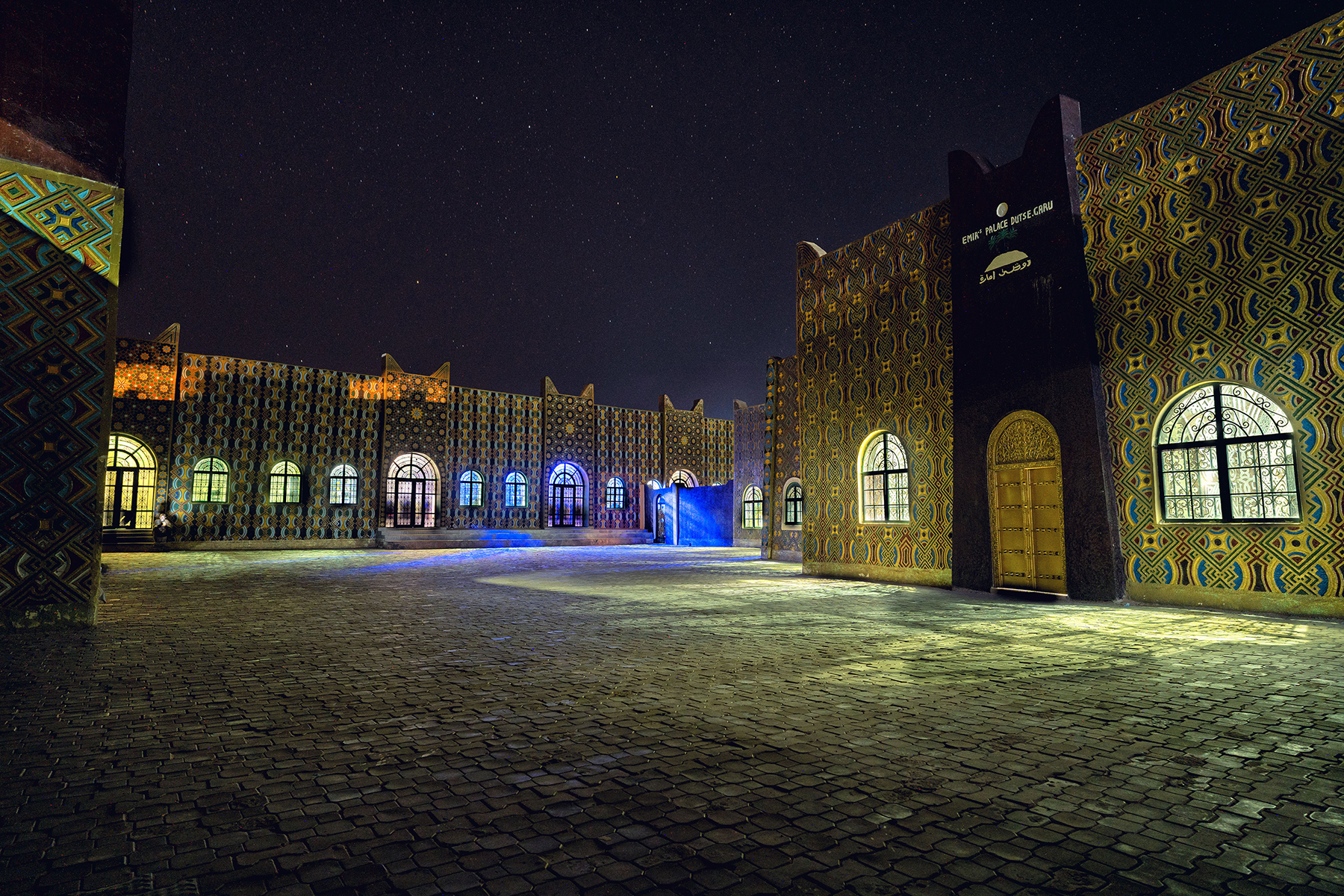
Dutse Emirs Palace

Dutse Emirate is a historical emirate council in Jigawa State, Nigeria. It traces its origins back to legends of early hunters and has been influenced by various rulers and events. The emirate's history includes connections to the Sarkin Kano, periods of Fulani ascendancy, and adaptation to colonial-era changes. The current emir of Dutse is Hameem Nuhu Sanusi.

== History ==
=== Beginning ===
According to legend, the area now called Dutse was first discovered by a hunter named Duna-Magu, who was great at hunting, especially gazelles. Because of this, he gave it the nickname "Gadawur." The settlement of Garu is believed to have existed even before Bagauda's arrival in Kano during the late 1st millennium.

=== Connection to Sarkin Kano ===
The earliest written record about Dutse is in the Kano Chronicle, which mentions its defeat by the Kano ruler Abdullahi Burja around the years 1438–1452. After this defeat, Abdullahi Burja married a daughter of the Sarkin Dutse, creating a connection between the two emirates. By the early 18th century, Dutse had become a substantial town with around seventy wards enclosed within its walls. These walls protected the central area around Jambo stream and had twelve city gates, each named after the nearest ward.

=== Rulers ===
Between 1732 and 1735, a powerful Fulani figure named Ada played a significant role in Dutse's history. Initially, he arrived in Dutse as a military envoy of Sarkin Kano Kumbari. However, Ada went on to defeat the ruler of Dutse and took control. His rule was short-lived as he faced opposition and fought against Kano forces. After Ada, Tsohon Mutum became the ruler of Dutse and is particularly remembered for building the Ganuwar Garu, an additional wall that fortified the Garu palace town. Later, the ascendancy of the Fulani in 1806 marked a turning point in Dutse's history.

=== The Fulani ascendancy in 1806 ===
In 1806, the Fulani, led by Salihi and Musa from the Yalligawa and Jalligawa Fulani clans, took control of Dutse. They had migrated to Dutse from Birnin Gazargamo in the Kanem–Bornu Empire. Their migration was due to a more favorable political climate in Dutse, where they became political leaders and Islamic scholars, earning the trust of the local people. This marked a significant change for Dutse, which now recognized Sarkin Kano Suleman as their spiritual leader. In return, Kano granted Dutse some autonomy in local administration.

== Emirs ==
List of the emirs of Dutse or Sarkin Dutse in Hausa.

1. Salihi dan Awwal - C1807-1819
2. Musa dan Ahmadu - C1819-1840
3. Bello dan Musa - C1840-1849
4. Suleiman dan Musa - C1849-1868
5. Ibrahim I dan Salihi - C1868-1884
6. Abdulkadir I dan Salihi - C1884-1893
7. Salihi dan Ibrahim - C1893-1894
8. Ibrahim II dan Musa - C1894-1894
9. Abdulkadir II dan Musa - C1894-1901
10. Abdulkadir III dan Ibrahim - C1901-1903
11. Haladu dan Sulemanu - C1903-1910
12. Halilu dan Bello - C1910-1911
13. Hamida dan Ibrahim - C1912-1912
14. Abdullahi 1 dan Sulemanu - C1912-1919
15. Bello II dan Abdulkadir - C1919-1923
16. Suleiman II dan Nuhu - C1923-1960
17. Abdullahi Maikano Sulemanu - C1960-1983
18. Mohammadu Sunusi dan Bello - C1983-1995
19. Nuhu Muhammad Sanusi - C1995-2023
20. Hameem Nuhu Sanusi - C2023-date

== Gallery ==
pictures from the emir's palace Garu

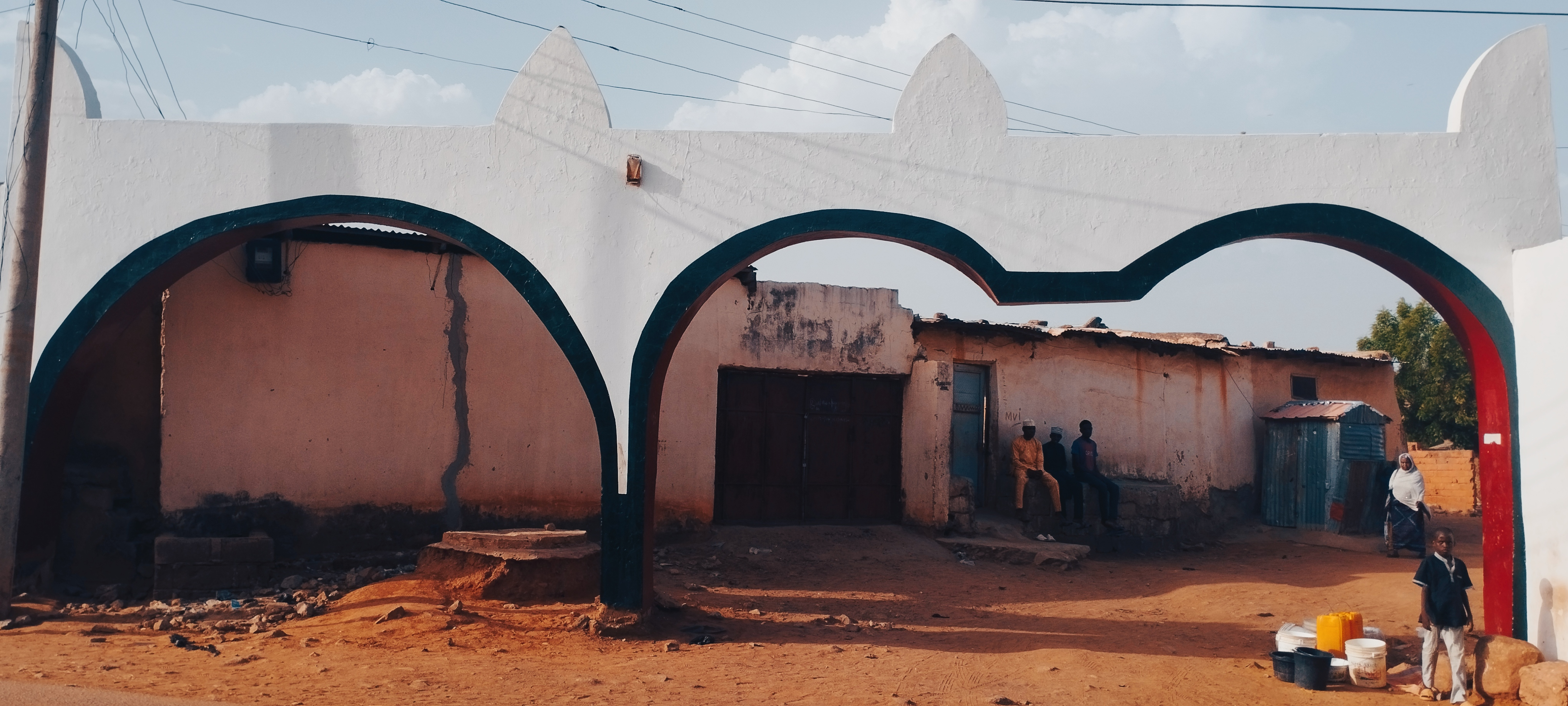

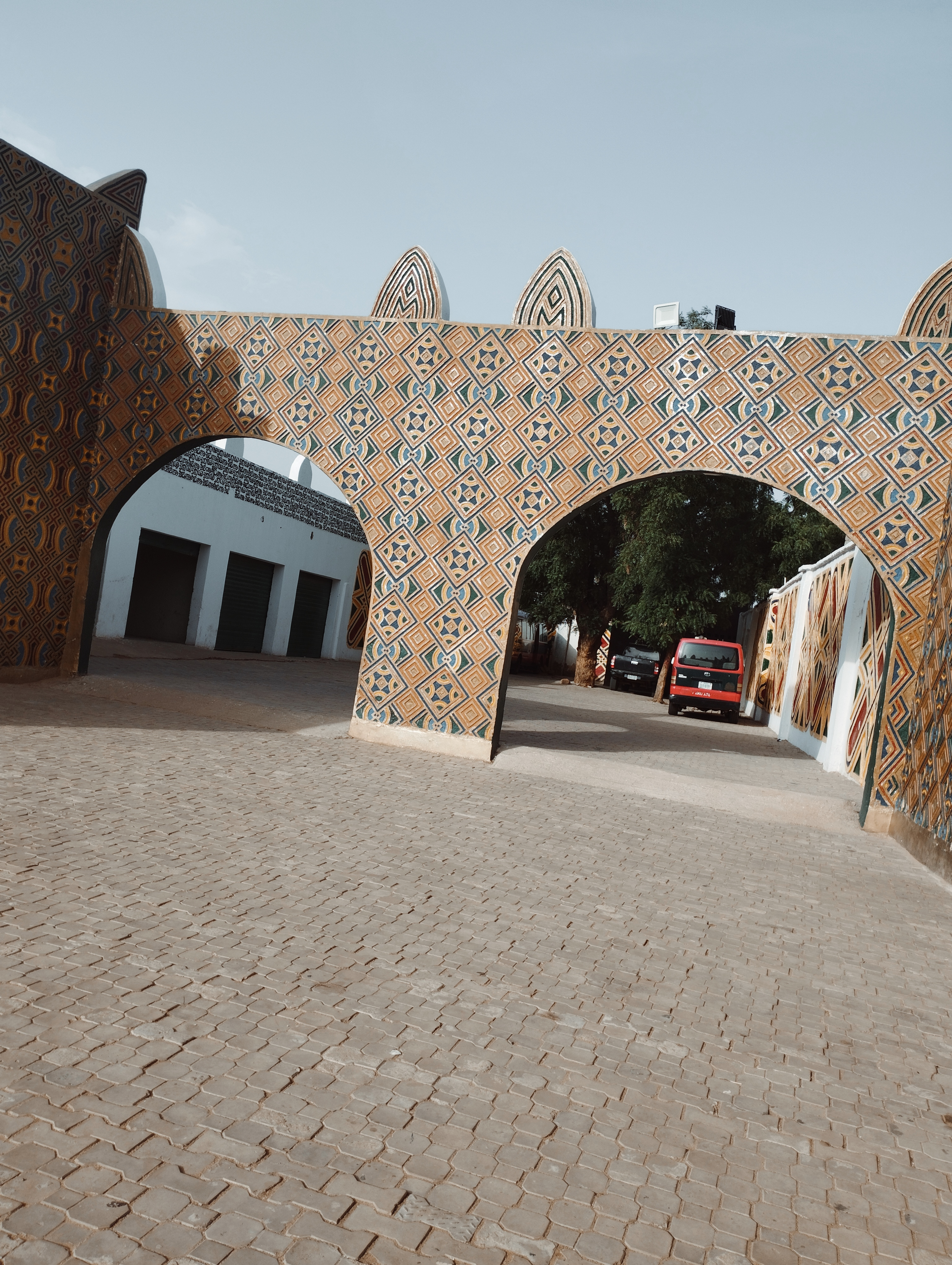

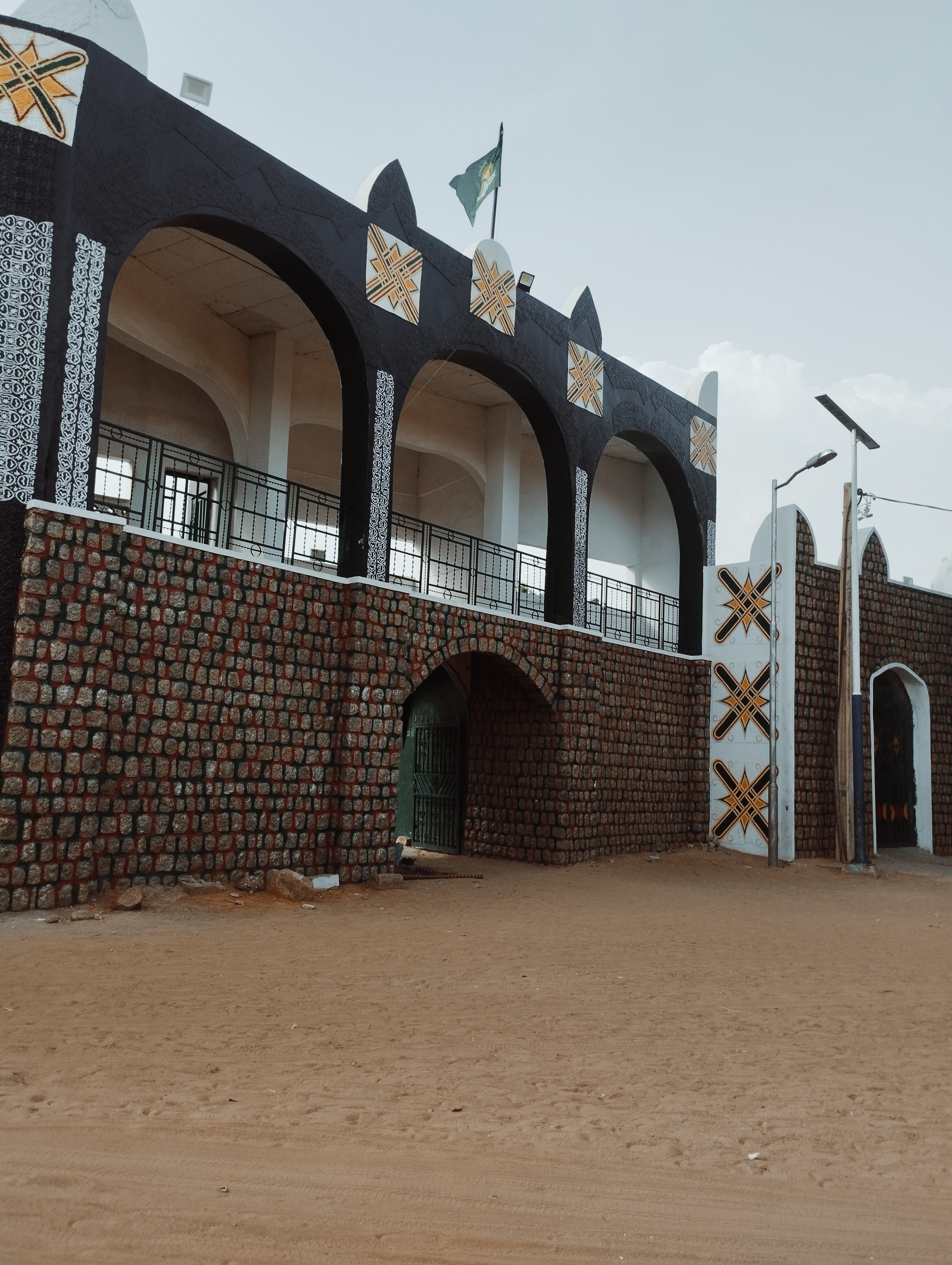

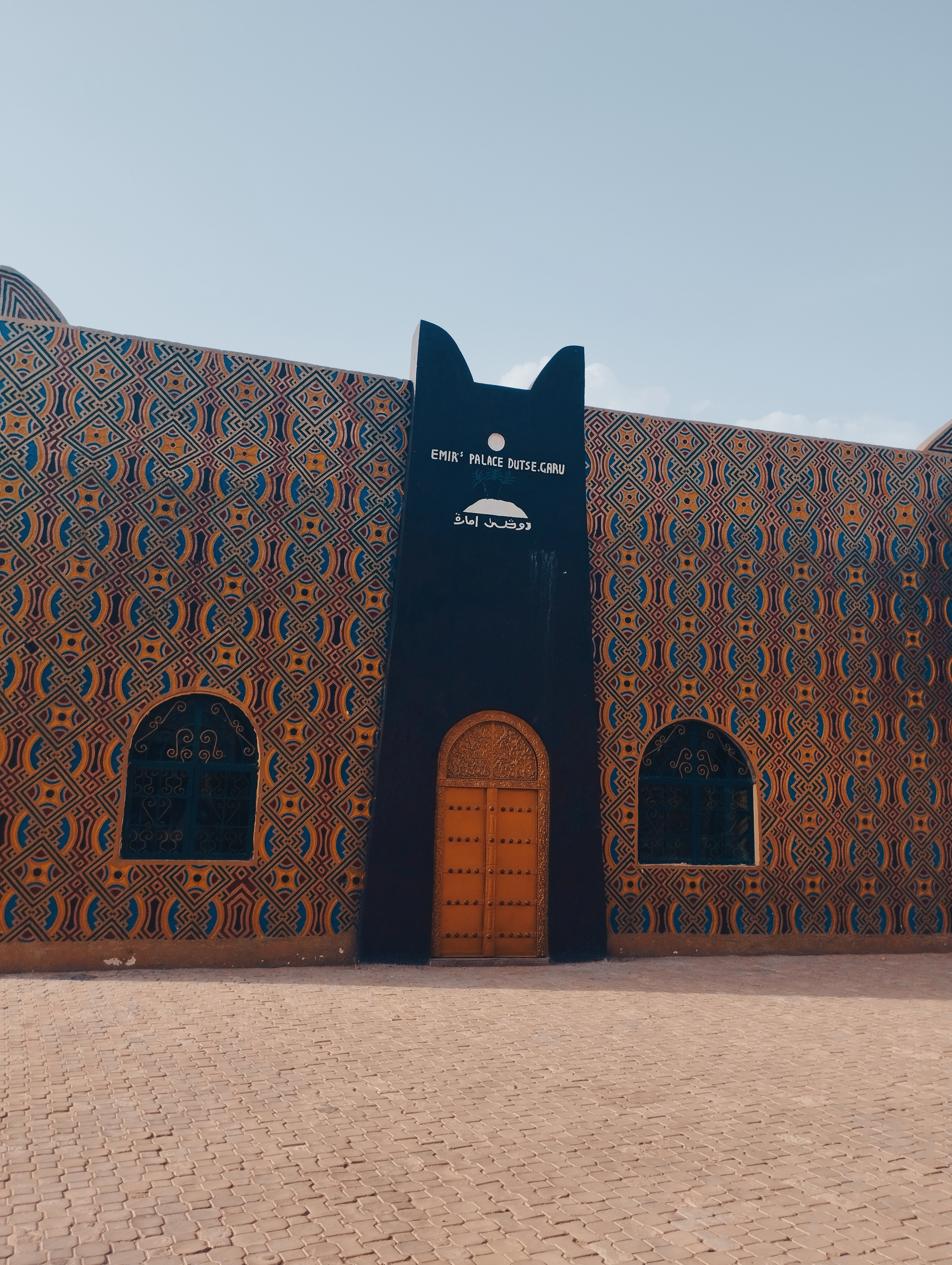

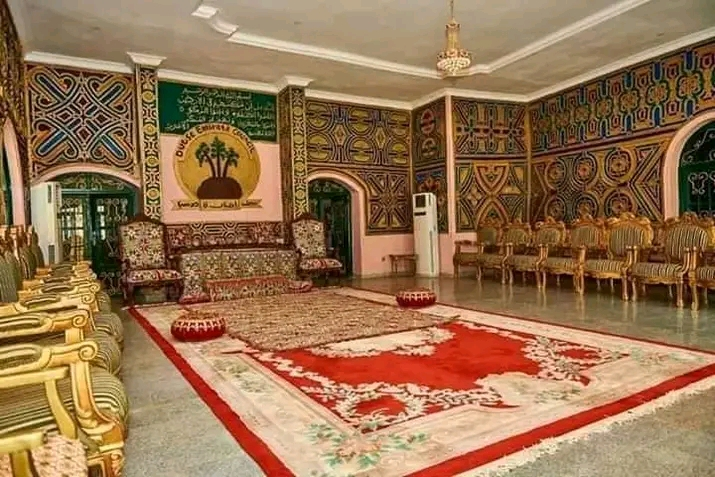

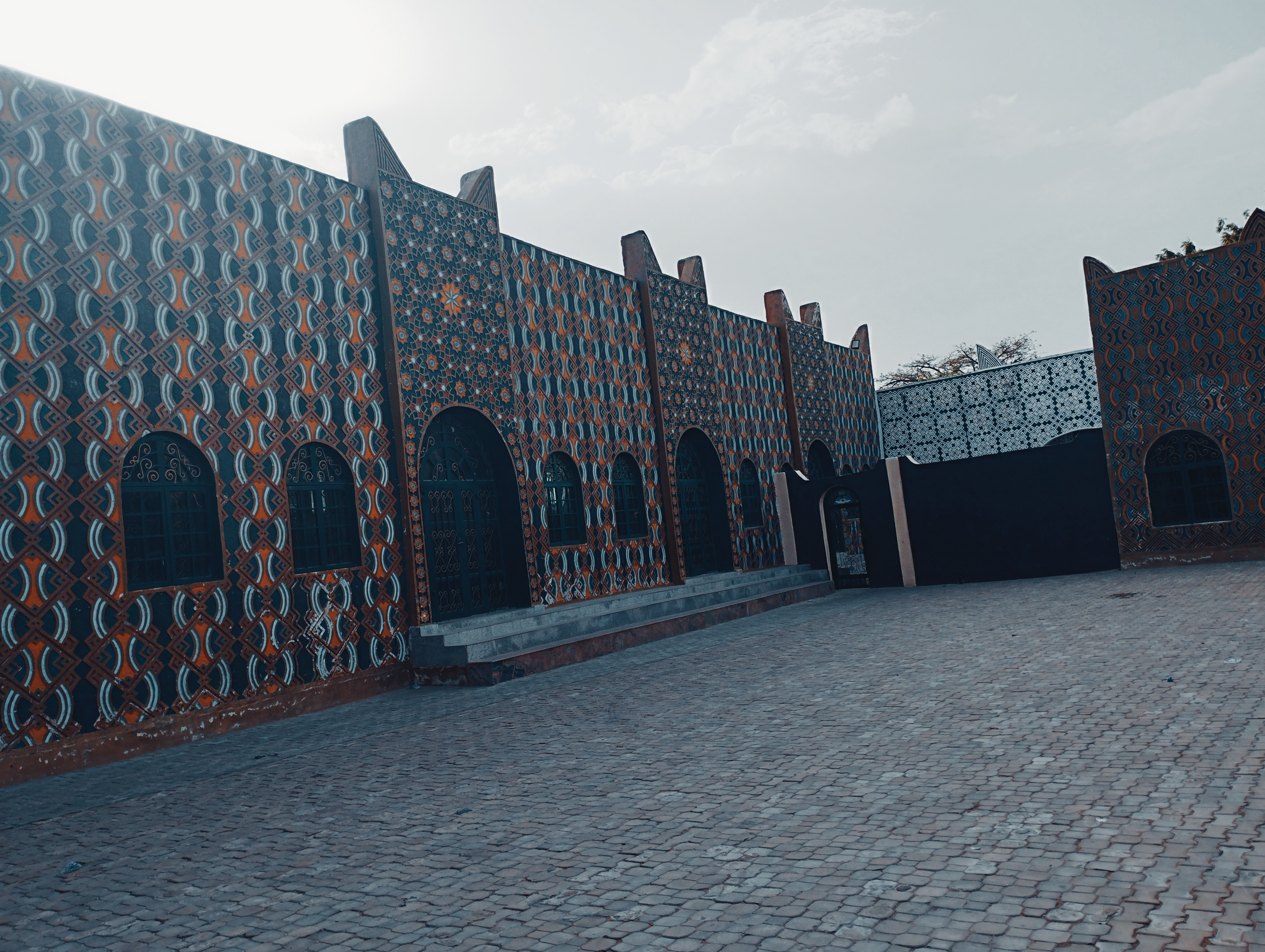

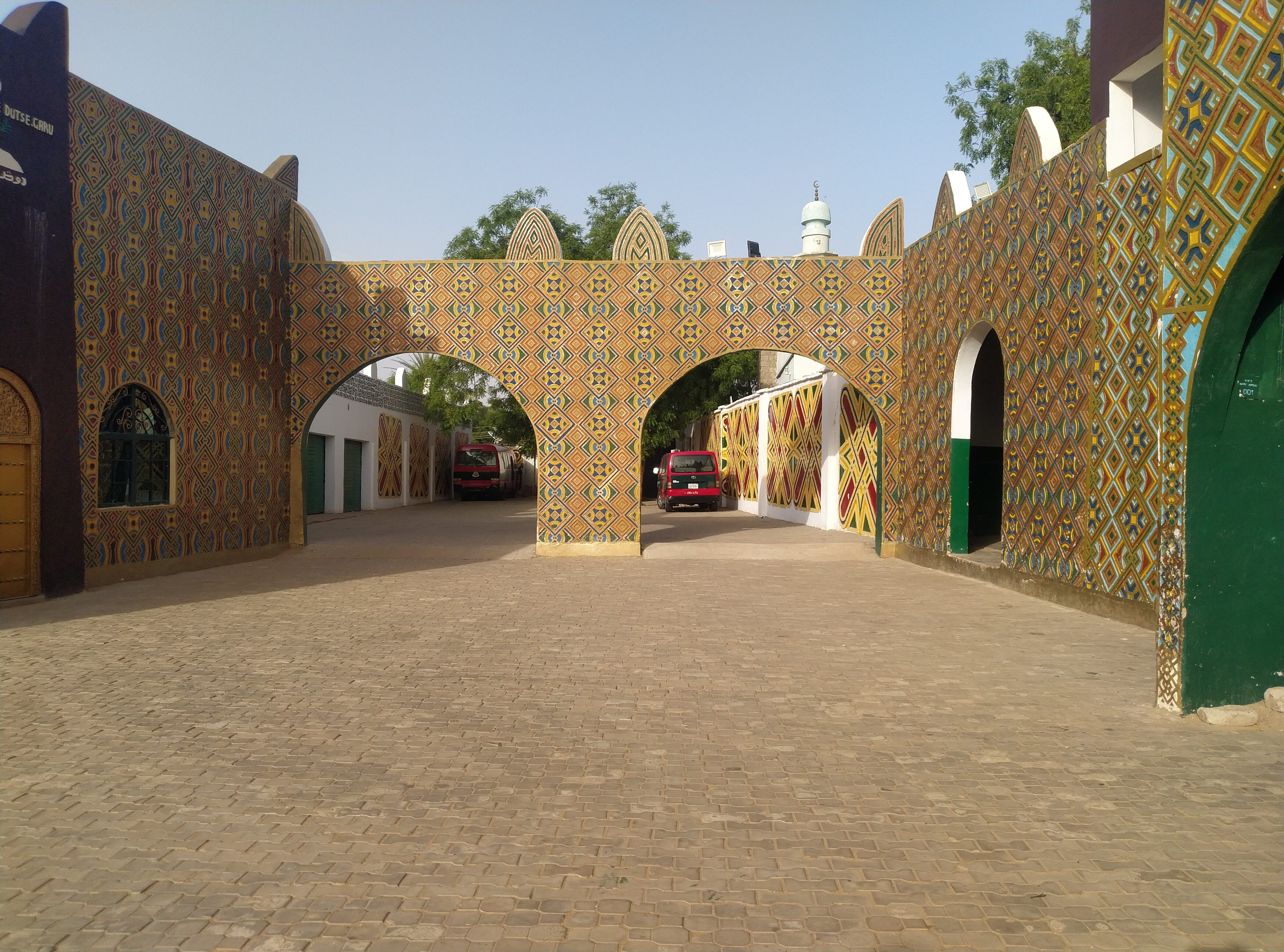
