= Federal Ministry of Commerce (Nigeria) =

Federal ministry Nigeria

The Federal Ministry of Commerce now Federal Ministry of Industry, Trade and Investment (Nigeria) was a ministry department of the Nigerian government that regulates commerce. The Federal Ministry of Commerce was combined with the portfolio of the Federal Ministry of Trade and Investment in 2011 and the resulting ministry is the Federal Ministry of Industry, Trade and Investment (Nigeria).

== Leadership ==
The ministry was headed by Nigerian Industrialist Charles Ugwuh from July 2007. On October 29, 2008, President Umaru Yar'Adua sacked 20 members of his cabinet, including Charles Ugwuh. In December Achike Udenwa was appointed Minister of Aviation. As of December 2009, the Permanent Secretary was Dr A.K. Mohammed.

== See also ==
- Nigerian Civil Service
- Federal Ministries of Nigeria
