= Bunu Sheriff Musa =

Nigerian administrator and engineer (1947–2021)

Bunu Sheriff Musa NPOM (14 January 1947 – 5 December 2021) was a Nigerian administrator and engineer who was a federal minister of Mines, Power and Steel during the administration of General Ibrahim Babangida.

== Life ==
Musa was born in Maiduguri, Nigeria, on 14 January 1947, and had his primary education at a local school in the city. He then attended Government College, Maiduguri for his secondary school studies graduating in 1967, thereafter, went to Federal School of Science to obtain his higher school certificate. Musa earned a degree in engineering from Ahmadu Bello University and a master's degree from Southampton University. Between 1970 and 1980, he worked as an engineer for the Inland Waterways division of the Federal Ministry of Transportation and then transferred services to Chad Basin Development Authority (CBDA). In 1981, he became the general manager of CBDA.

After a military coup brought General Babangida to power, Musa was among members of the new executive cabinet when he was appointed Minister of Industries. He was moved shuffled between various ministries serving as minister of Mines and Power, Aviation and Water Resources. In 1990, he was redeployed to the Ministry of Labour to quell tensions arising when unions demanded higher minimum wage. Musa developed a working relationship with the labour leaders yielding to some wage increases in 1990.

He served as the Nigerian Ambassador Extraordinary and Plenipotentiary to France in 1998 and as the Chairman Governing Council of the Ahmadu Bello University from 2009 to 2012. He was credited as someone who was always willing to obey call to service and especially promotion of skills in personal development.

== Death ==
Musa died on 5 December 2021, at the age of 74.

== Fellowship ==
Musa was a fellow of the Nigerian Academy of Engineering, Nigerian Society of Engineers and Council for the Regulation of Engineering in Nigeria (COREN). He was also a chartered Engineer. He was the recipient of several awards, including the National Productivity Order of Merit (NPOM) in 2009, and the Order of the Federal Republic (OFR).
