= Adelusi Adeluyi =

Nigerian pharmacist and Minister

Prince Julius Adewale Adelusi-Adeluyi (born 2 August 1940) is a Nigerian pharmacist, legal practitioner and former Minister of Health and Human Resources.

He is the founder and chairman of Juli Plc, the first indigenous promoted company quoted on the Nigerian Stock Exchange in 1986.

Adelusi-Adeluyi attended the Nigerian College of Arts, Science and Technology, Ibadan (1959–1961) to obtain his GCE advanced level in science subjects. The campus became the starting venue for the University of Ife when it was created in 1961. He graduated in 1965 and was elected the Secretary-General of the International Student Conference at their annual conference in Christchurch, New Zealand.

He joined the Rotary club of Ikeja in 1969 and was elected the district-governor-elect for District 210 covering West Africa. In 1982, he became the first District Governor of Rotary District 911 upon carving out Nigeria from District 210. In his capacity, he laid a solid foundation for the growth of Rotary in Nigeria. He received a letter of Commendation form President Shehu Shagari for his role for the promotion of service organizations in Nigeria. District 911 was specifically recognized at the Toronto Rotary International Convention in 1983. He is a recipient of several awards from Rotary and other international service organizations.

Adelusi-Adeluyi is also a past Group Chairman of Oodua Investment Conglomerate, a founding and distinguished Fellow of the Institute of Directors (DFIoD), Nigeria, the pioneer President of the Nigeria Academy of Pharmacy and Fellow of the Nigerian Institute of Management.

He is also a former National of the Nigerian-America Chamber of Commerce and the Chairman Board of Trustees of the Chamber. He also served as the President of the National Institute of Policy and Strategic Studies (NIPSS).
