= Bagudu Mamman =

Nigeria military officer (born 1941)

Major general Bagudu Mamman

Federal Minister of Interior
- In office 1990–1991
- Preceded by: Lambert Gwon
- Succeeded by: Tunji Olagunji

Federal Minister of Technology
- In office 1992–1992

Personal details
- Born: 21 July 1941 (age 85) Abaji, Northern Region, British Nigeria (now in FCT, Nigeria)

Military service
- Allegiance: Nigeria
- Branch/service: Nigerian Army
- Years of service: 1968–1990
- Rank: Major general

Abdullahi Bagudu Mamman, fss, psc, mni (21 July 1941) is a retired Nigerian army major general, politician and traditional leader who served in two ministerial positions, Technology and the Internal affairs.

== Background and career ==
Born in Abaji, now present in Abuja, Bagudu Mamman started his education at Native Authority Primary School in 1947, then he attended Kwara Senior Primary School, Ugu-Beku from 1950 to 1957. Finally, he attended Provincial Secondary School, Okene until 1962.

Mamman enrolled in Nigerian Military Training College, Kaduna in 1963 and Royal Military Academy Sandhurst, United Kingdom in 1964 to 1965. In 1968 he attended the Royal School of Artillery, United Kingdom, followed by the Odesa Military Academy from 1970-1971.

Finally, Bagudu Mamman later joined the Command and Staff College, Jaji in 1976 for his senior military course and holds diploma in National Institute for Policy and Strategic Studies, Jos. Later in 2001 he was awarded Ph.D.

Mamman commanded 32 field artillery regiment of Nigerian Army in 1970 and brigade command school of artillery in 1975 - 1979, chief military personnel officer, United Nation Interim Force Lebanon in 1981, Commander Corps of Signal 1983 and School of Artillery Brigade. He was Army training and operations director in 1985 and was member of Armed Forces Ruling Council from 1985 - 1989. Later in 1988 he was Commandant, Armed Force Command and Staff College, Jaji till 1990 when he retired and was appointed Minister. In 1993 he founded the Hikma International Limited. Later he chaired the Administrative body in University of Nsukka 1995.
