= National Insurance Commission (NAICOM) =

Federal Government Agency

- Abbreviation: NAICOM

Agency overview
- Formed: 1997

Jurisdictional structure
- Federal agency (Operations jurisdiction): Nigeria
- Operations jurisdiction: Nigeria
- Legal jurisdiction: National Insurance Commission
- Governing body: President of Nigeria
- Constituting instrument: National Insurance Commission Act 1997
- General nature: Federal law enforcement

Operational structure
- Headquarters: Plot 1239, Ladoke Akintola Boulevard, Garki II Abuja.
- Agency executive: Olusegun Ayo Omosehin, Commissioner for Insurance/Chief Executive

Website
- https://www.naicom.gov.ng/

The National Insurance Commission (NAICOM) is a government-owned parastatal in the insurance industry in Nigeria, with the main goal of protecting insurance policyholders and ensuring that the industry operates smoothly and efficiently under the leadership of the commissioner for insurance Mr Olusegun Omosehin.

== History ==
In order to protect insurance policyholders and guarantee the smooth and efficient operation of the insurance industry in Nigeria, the National Insurance Commission was founded in 1997. It also provides annual reports on the insurance industry and advises the Federal Government on issues pertaining to insurance. To promote insurance education and training, the parastatal collaborates with various governmental entities and groups.

== Functions ==
NAICOM was reportedly to set the guidelines for insurance businesses, approving insurance prices and name changes, and making sure that vital government assets are sufficiently safeguarded were among the duties carried out by the agency.
