= Bola Afonja =

Nigerian politician (1943–2024)

Minister of Labour and Productivity
- In office August 1993 – 17 November 1993
- Head of State: Ernest Shonekan

Personal details
- Born: 21 February 1943 Oyo, Colony and Protectorate of Nigeria
- Died: 19 May 2024 (aged 81) Ibadan, Oyo State, Nigeria
- Occupation: Politician

Prince Ajibola Afonja (21 February 1943 – 19 May 2024), known as Bola Afonja, was a Nigerian politician and philanthropist. He was Minister of Labour under Ernest Shonekan, and was once a member of the board of trustees of the All Nigeria Peoples Party (ANPP).

Afonja was Chairman of the Board of Directors of First Bank plc, Nigeria's biggest commercial bank. He retired from the Board following his 70th birthday on 21 February 2013.

Afonja died, apparently of accidental injuries, at University College Hospital in Ibadan, on 19 May 2024, at the age of 81.
