= Federal Ministry of Industry, Trade and Investment (Nigeria) =

Agency overview
- Formed: 2011
- Jurisdiction: Federal Government of Nigeria
- Headquarters: Old Federal Secretariat, Durumi, Garki, Federal Capital Territory, Nigeria
- Minister responsible: Jumoke Oduwole
- Agency executive: Nura Abba Rimi, Permanent Secretary
- Website: http://fmiti.gov.ng/

The Federal Ministry of Industry, Trade and Investment (FMITI) is a branch of the federal government of Nigeria responsible for creating wealth and employment, reducing poverty, and stimulating and diversifying the economy. Jumoke Oduwole is the current Minister of Industry, Trade and Investment, appointed by President Bola Tinubu in 2024, while Senator John Owan Enoh serves as the Minister of State for Industry, Federal Ministry of Industry, Trade and Investment.

The ministry was restructured and renamed in 2011, combining the portfolios of the Ministry of Commerce and Industry and the Ministry of Trade and Investment.
