= Chu Okongwu =

Nigerian economist and politician (1934–2022)

Chu Okongwu KBE PhD

Minister of Finance
- In office 1986–1990

Minister of National Planning
- In office 1985–1986

Personal details
- Born: 23 September 1934 Anambra State, Nigeria
- Died: 12 January 2022 (aged 87)
- Education: Boston University, Massachusetts; Harvard University
- Profession: Economist

Sonny Chu Okongwu // (23 September 1934 – 12 January 2022) was a Nigerian economist and politician who was the Minister of National Planning (1985–1986), and then Minister of Finance (1986–1990) during the Babangida administration.

== Life and career ==
Okongwu was born on 23 September 1934 in Anambra State, Nigeria. He was the first of eight children. Okongwu attended St. Michael's school, Aba between 1941 and 1946. From there he moved to Government College, Umuahia, where he was a student from 1947 to 1951. He studied economic theory at Boston University, and completed his degree in 1961. He also attended Harvard University from 1961 to 1965. Okongwu died on 12 January 2022, at the age of 87.
