= Nigeria Revenue Service =

Nigerian government tax and revenue agency

Agency overview
- Formed: 1943
- Preceding agency: Federal Inland Revenue Service
- Jurisdiction: Nigeria
- Headquarters: Abuja
- Agency executive: Zaccheus Adedeji, Executive Chairman
- Website: Official website

The Nigeria Revenue Service (NRS), formerly the Federal Inland Revenue Service (FIRS), is the agency responsible for assessing, collecting and accounting for tax and other revenues accruing to the Federal Government of Nigeria. In the 2025 fiscal year, the Service generated a record ₦28.3 trillion in revenue, representing a 30% increase from the previous year

== History ==
The Federal Inland Revenue Service (FIRS) was created in 1943. Prior to that time, its functions had been performed by the Inland Revenue Department of British West Africa. The Board of Inland Revenue was created in 1958, and the service gained autonomy with the passing of the FIRS (Establishment) Act No. 13 of 2007.

In 2003, the Federal Government of Nigeria recognized that poor service delivery in the public sector had become an urgent national issue and undertook a series of steps that led to the entering into a Service Compact (SERVICOM) with all Nigerians in March 2004. This was followed by the creation of the SERVICOM office within the Presidency to ensure the entrenchment of excellent service delivery in the public sector in policy, programmes and practice.

In line with the subsequent Presidential Mandate, the FIRS created a unit in 2014 to institutionalize Service Delivery within the Service. This unit has undergone various transformations to meet the tempo of ever-changing FIRS organizational reforms and the needs of taxpaying public and stakeholders. In 2011, FIRS created a Taxpayer Service Department (TPSD) for enhanced focus on taxpayers, as well as a National Taxpayer Advocate position (in 2012) to ensure effective high-level advocacy for taxpayers.

== Reform and renaming (2025) ==
In 2025, the Nigerian government enacted major reforms to modernise tax administration. The Federal Inland Revenue Service (FIRS) was officially renamed the Nigeria Revenue Service (NRS) following the passage of the Nigeria Revenue Service (Establishment) Act, 2025.

The reform introduced measures aimed at simplifying compliance, broadening the tax base, and boosting revenue collection. The NRS was given expanded powers to improve automation, integrate digital platforms and strengthen enforcement.

Professional services firms noted that the reforms represented the most comprehensive update to Nigeria’s tax laws in decades, harmonising multiple statutes and streamlining processes.

== Leadership ==
Organisational structure/board

According to the FIRS Act, the organisational structure of FIRS consisted of:

- Executive chairman
- Nine members with relevant qualifications and expertise appointed by the president to represent each of the 9 geo-political zones
- A representative of the attorney-general of the federation
- The governor of the Central Bank of Nigeria or his representative
- A representative of the minister of finance not below the rank of a director
- The chairman of the Revenue Mobilization, Allocation and Fiscal Commission
- The group managing director of the Nigerian National Petroleum Corporation
- The comptroller-general of the Nigeria Customs Service or his representative not below the rank of Deputy Comptroller-General
- The registrar-general of the Corporate Affairs Commission or his representative
- The chief executive officer of the National Planning Commission or his representative

President Muhammadu Buhari appointed Muhammad Mamman Nami as executive chairman in December 2019, replacing Babatunde Fowler.

The incumbent executive chairman is Zacch Adedeji, appointed by President Bola Tinubu on 14 September 2023.

== Investigation and operations ==
The NRS is responsible for the assessment, collection and accounting of taxes to the Government:

- The timely provision and publication of accurate data and annual reports to the Federal Government of Nigeria and other stakeholders to inform national economic planning, academic research, tax policy and development legislation
- The timely provision of tax advisory services, rulings, guidance notes and clarifications on request and to the public in general
- The regular investigation, enforcement and prosecution of tax defaulters as provided by the law
- The issuance of “Taxpayer Identification Number” (TIN) at no cost to the taxpayer
- The prompt processing of payment claims and tax refund requests received, within stated timeframes
- Undertake appropriate actions to reduce arrears and minimise debt profile
- The regular and accurate reconciliation of taxes received into Federation, Consolidated and VAT accounts as the case may be
- Provision of tax education and information to taxpayers through diverse channels and languages

== Online services ==
In 2025, an independent online platform called NairaTax. was launched to provide Nigerians with free tax calculators and resources to estimate their tax obligations. The platform complements official e-services provided by the NRS.

On 10 June, 2026, the Nigeria Revenue Service launched Rev360, a digital tax administration platform that replaced the earlier TaxPro Max system. Rev360 brings together taxpayer registration, filing, payment processing, compliance management, reporting,and support services in one integrated platform.
