= Federal Ministry of Finance (Nigeria) =

Federal ministry of the Federal Republic of Nigeria

Agency overview
- Formed: 1960; 66 years ago
- Type: Executive Department
- Jurisdiction: Federal Government of Nigeria
- Headquarters: Ahmadu Bello Way, Central Business District, Abuja, Federal Capital Territory.
- Minister responsible: Taiwo Oyedele, Federal Minister of Finance and Coordinating Minister of the Economy; Minister of State for Finance
- Agency executive: Permanent Secretary
- Parent department: Government of Nigeria
- Key document: Constitution of Nigeria
- Website: https://finance.gov.ng/

The Federal Ministry of Finance is the government body that manages the finances of the Federal Government of Nigeria, including managing, controlling and monitoring federal revenues and expenditures.

== Bureaucratic Leadership ==
A senior civil servant serves as the Permanent Secretary of the ministry, assisting the politically appointed Minister of Finance and the Minister of State for Finance, who are members of the President's cabinet.

The Federal Ministry of Finance is led by the Honourable Minister of Finance and Coordinating Minister of the Economy, who serves as the chief executive officer. This role involves engaging with the public, both domestically and internationally. The Minister interacts with the ministry's bureaucracy through the Permanent Secretary, who oversees financial management as the Chief Accounting Officer.

The Permanent Secretary acts as a gateway for official documents intended for the Minister, verifying their legitimacy and propriety before transmission. This ensures that all documents presented to the Minister are validated and appropriate.

== Parastatals and agencies ==
The Ministry of Finance is responsible for a number of parastatals and agencies:

- Office of the Accountant General of the Federation Of Nigeria
- Central Bank of Nigeria
- Federal Inland Revenue Service
- Investments and Securities Tribunal
- National Insurance Commission
- Nigerian Export Import Bank
- Nigeria Deposit Insurance Corporation
- Nigerian Customs Service
- Securities and Exchange Commission
- Equipment Leasing Registration Authority

== See also ==
- Finance Minister of Nigeria
- Federal Ministries of Nigeria
- Nigerian Civil Service
