= List of government agencies of Nigeria =

The following is a list of agencies in the government of Nigeria.

== Agriculture ==
- Cocoa Research Institute of Nigeria (CRIN)
- National Agricultural Extension, Research and Liaison Services (NAERLS)
- National Veterinary Research Institute (NVRI)
- Nigerian Agricultural Insurance Corporation (NAIC)
- National Root Crops Research Institute (NCRI)
- Agricultural Research Council of Nigeria
- Nigerian Institute for Oceanography and Marine Research
- Nigerian Institute for Oil Palm Research (NIFOR)
- Nigeria Agricultural Quarantine Service (NAQS)
- National Horticultural Research Institute (NIHORT)

== Aviation ==
- Federal Airports Authority of Nigeria (FAAN)
- Nigerian Airspace Management Agency (NAMA)
- Nigerian Civil Aviation Authority (NCAA)
- Nigerian Safety Investigation Bureau (NSIB)
- Nigerian Meteorological Agency (NIMET)
- Nigerian College of Aviation Technology (NCAT)

== Communications ==
- National Information Technology Development Agency (NITDA)
- Nigeria Communications Satellite Limited (NIGCOMSAT)
- Nigerian Broadcasting Commission (NBC)
- Nigerian Communications Commission (NCC)
- Nigerian Postal Service (NIPOST)
- National Frequency Management Council
- Nigerian Television Authority (NTA)
- Galaxy Backbone (GBB)

== Economy ==
- Asset Management Corporation of Nigeria (AMCON)
- Social Security Administration of Nigeria (SSA)
- Budget Office of the Federation (BOF)
- Bureau of Public Procurement (BPP)
- Central Bank of Nigeria (CBN)
- Corporate Affairs Commission (CAC)
- Debt Management Office (DMO)
- Nigeria Revenue Service (NRS)
- Federal Mortgage Bank of Nigeria (FMBN)
- Fiscal Responsibility Commission (FRC) - defunct
- National Bureau of Statistics (NBS)
- National Council on Privatisation (NCP)
- National Insurance Commission (NAICOM)
- National Planning Commission (NPC)
- National Sugar Development Council (NSDC)
- Niger Delta Development Commission (NDDC)
- Nigeria Customs Service (NCS)
- Nigeria Deposit Insurance Corporation (NDIC)
- Nigeria Investment Promotion Commission (NIPC)
- Nigerian Export - Import Bank (NEXIM Bank)
- Nigerian Export Promotion Council (NEPC)
- Oil and Gas Free Zones Authority (OGFZA)
- Nigeria Export Processing Zones Authority (NEPZA)
- Revenue Mobilisation Allocation and Fiscal Commission (RMAFC)
- Securities and Exchange Commission (SEC)
- Standards Organisation of Nigeria (SON)
- Small and Medium Enterprise Development Agency of Nigeria (SMEDAN)

== Education ==
- National Board for Arabic And Islamic Studies (NBAIS)
- Joint Admissions and Matriculation Board (JAMB)
- National Examination Council (NECO)
- National Open University of Nigeria (NOUN)
- National Teachers Institute (NTI)
- National Universities Commission (NUC)
- Tertiary Education Trust Fund (TETFUND)
- Teachers Registration Council of Nigeria (TRCN)
- National Business and Technical Examinations Board (NABTEB)
- Universal Basic Education Commission (UBEC)
- West African Examination Council (WAEC)
- National Commission for Colleges of Education (NCCE)
- National Library of Nigeria (NLN)
- Nigerian Education Loan Fund (NELFUND)

== Energy ==
- Nigerian Midstream and Downstream Petroleum Regulatory Authority (NMDPRA)
- Nigerian Upstream Petroleum Regulatory Commission (NUPRC)
- Electricity Management Services Limited (EMSL)
- Energy Commission of Nigeria (ECN)
- National Power Training Institute of Nigeria (NAPTIN)
- Nigerian Electricity Regulatory Commission (NERC)
- Nigerian Content Monitoring and Development Board (NCMDB)
- Nigerian National Petroleum Corporation (NNPC)
- Nigerian Nuclear Regulatory Authority (NNRA)
- Petroleum Product Pricing Regulatory Agency (PPPRA)
- Power Holding Company of Nigeria (PHCN) - defunct
- Rural Electrification Agency (REA)
- Transmission Company of Nigeria (TCN)

== Environment ==
- Federal Environmental Protection Agency (FEPA) - defunct
- Forestry Research Institute of Nigeria (FRIN)
- National Biosafety Management Agency (NBMA)
- National Environmental Standards and Regulations Enforcement Agency (NESREA)
- National Oil Spill Detection and Response Agency (NOSDRA)
- Environmental Health Officers Registration Council of Nigeria (EHORECON)
- National Agency for the Great Green Wall (NAGGW)

== Health ==
- National Health Insurance Authority (NHIA)
- National Institute for Pharmaceutical Research and Development (NIPRD)
- National Agency for the Control of AIDS (NACA)
- National Agency for Food and Drug Administration and Control (NAFDAC)
- National Primary Health Care Development Agency (NPHCDA)
- Nigerian Institute of Medical Research (NIMR)
- Nigeria Centre for Disease Control (NCDC)
- National Drug Law Enforcement Agency (NDLEA)

== Intelligence ==
- Defence Intelligence Agency (DIA)
- State Security Service (SSS)
- National Intelligence Agency (NIA)
- Nigerian Financial Intelligence Unit (NFIU)

== Judiciary ==
- National Judicial Council (NJC)
- Federal Judicial Service Commission (FJSC)
- National Judicial Institute (NJI)

== Maritime ==
- Nigerian Maritime Administration and Safety Agency (NIMASA)
- Nigerian Ports Authority (NPA)
- Nigerian Shippers' Council (NSC)
- National Inland Waterways Authority (NIWA)

== Media ==
- Broadcasting Organisation of Nigeria (BON)
- News Agency of Nigeria (NAN)
- Nigerian Press Council (NPC)
- Nigerian Television Authority (NTA)
- Federal Radio Corporation of Nigeria (FRCN)

== Science and Technology ==
- National Agency For Science and Engineering Infrastructure (NASENI)
- National Biotechnology Development Agency (NABDA)
- National Centre for Remote Sensing (NCRS)
- Sheda Science and Technology Complex (SHESTCO)
- National Office for Technology Acquisition and Promotion (NOTAP)
- National Space Research and Development Agency (NASRDA)
- Nigerian Nuclear Regulatory Authority (NNRA)
- Raw Materials Research and Development Council (RMRDC)
- Nigerian Communications Satellite Ltd (NIGCOMSAT)
- National Centre for Technology Management (NACETEM)

== Water Resources ==
- Nigeria Hydrological Services Agency (NIHSA)
- Nigerian Integrated Water Resources Commission
- National Water Resources Institute (NWRI)
- River Basin Development Authorities (RBDA)

== SGF ==
The Office of the Secretary to the Government of the Federation (SGF), which is domiciled in the presidency, also has some agencies under it. They are:

- Nigerian Christian Pilgrim Commission
- National Lottery Trust Fund
- Nigeria National Merit Award
- National Commission for Refugees, Migrants, and Internally Displaced Persons (formerly National Commission for Refugees)
- SERVICOM
- National Salaries, Incomes and Wages Commission
- Federal Character Commission (FCC)
- National Lottery Regulatory Commission
- National Pension Commission
- Bureau of Public Enterprises
- Revenue, Mobilization, Allocation & Fiscal Commission
- New Partnership for African Development (NEPAD)
- Border Communities Development Agency (BCDA)
- Federal Road Safety Corps
- National Energy Council
- Nigeria Atomic Energy Commission
- National Hajj Commission of Nigeria (NaHCON)
- Infrastructure Concession Regulatory Commission (ICRC)
- Nigerian Extractive Industries Transparency Initiative (NEITI)
- Federal Character Commission
- National Youth Commission

== Interior ==
There are six agencies under the Ministry of Interior, the latest one being NIMC.

- Federal Fire Service
- Nigeria Immigration Service (NIS)
- Nigerian Correctional Service
- Nigeria Security and Civil Defence Corps
- National Identity Management Commission (NIMC)
- The Civil Defence, Immigration, Prisons, Fire Service Board (CDFIPB)

== Uncategorised ==
- Centre for Black and African Arts and Civilization (CBAAC)
- National Automotive Design and Development Council (NADDC)
- Code of Conduct Bureau (CCB)
- Computer Professionals Registration Council of Nigeria (CPN)
- Consumer Protection Council (CPC)
- Economic and Financial Crimes Commission (EFCC)
- Federal Housing Authority (FHA)
- Independent Corrupt Practices and Other Related Offences Commission (ICPC)
- Independent National Electoral Commission (INEC)
- Industrial Training Fund (ITF)
- Legal Aid Council of Nigeria (LACoN)
- National Agency for the Prohibition of Trafficking in Persons (NAPTIP)
- National Boundary Commission
- National Council of Arts and Culture (NCAC)
- National Economic Reconstruction Fund (NERFUND)
- National Emergency Management Agency (NEMA)
- National Human Rights Commission (NHRC)
- National Identity Management Commission (NIMC)
- National Institute for Hospitality Tourism (NIHOTOUR)
- National Orientation Agency (NOA)
- National Population Commission
- National Poverty Eradication Programme (NAPEP) - defunct
- National Sports Commission (NSC)
- Nigeria Extractive Industries Transprency Initiative (NEITI)
- Nigerian Building and Road Research Institute (NBRRI)
- Nigeria Institute of Building (NIOB)
- Nigerian Copyright Commission (NCC)
- Nigerian Tourism Development Corporation (NTDC)
- Public Complaints Commission, Nigeria
- Surveyors Council Of Nigeria
