= Garba Hamidu Sharubutu =

Nigerian veterinary doctor and agricultural scientist

Garba Hamidu Sharubutu is a Nigerian agricultural scientist, a veterinary doctor and the executive secretary, Agricultural Research Council of Nigeria. He represents Nigeria on the Board of Trustees of the African Agricultural Technology Foundation.

== Early life and education ==
Sharubutu was born on 19 June 1961 in Kwande a town in Qua’an – Pan Local Government Area, Plateau State. He attended St. John Vianney's Transferred Roman Catholic(RCM) Primary School, Kwande, G.S.S. Shendam and Plateau State School of Preliminary Studies (SPS), Keffi . In 1986, he obtained the Doctor of Veterinary degree from Ahmadu Bello University, Zaria, a Masters of Veterinary Science (M.V.Sc) degree from University of Ibadan in 1992 and a PhD in the same discipline from Usman Dan Fodiyo University, Sokoto in 2002.

== Career ==
He won the President's NYSC National Honours award for the year 1986/87 service year, and was absorbed into the Federal Livestock Department, Ministry of Agriculture. In 1991, he took up an appointment with Usman Dan Fodiyo University, Sokoto as an Assistant Lecturer. He rose through the ranks and became a professor in 2005. He was the provost, Federal College of Animal Health and Production Technology, Vom Plateau State from December 2013 to September 2019 when he was appointed the acting executive secretary, Agricultural Research Council of Nigeria (ARCN). His appointment was confirmed in 2020.

In January, 2023, he was nominated and accepted as a member of the Board of Trustees of African Agricultural Technology Foundation (AATF). He represents the Federal Government of Nigeria in the organization which works toward food security in Africa through agricultural technology and which is active in 23 countries of East Africa, Southern Africa and West Africa.

He has served as president of the Nigerian Veterinary Medical Association and the president of the Veterinary Council of Nigeria. He is also the editor-in-chief of Journal of Applied Agricultural Research. Sharubutu is also a member of the CGIAR System Council.

== Controversies ==
Sharubutu has been accused of abuse of office and violation of the conflict of interest principle in the award of contracts.
