= Azikiwe Peter Onwualu =

Nigerian administrator

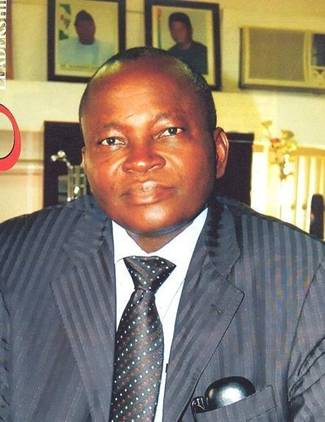
- peter Onwualu in 2013

Director General and Chief Executive Officer of the Raw Materials Research and Development Council (RMRDC)
- In office 2010–2014
- Succeeded by: Ibrahim Hussaini Doko

Former Director, National Agency for Science and Engineering Infrastructure, (NASENI) Abuja.

Personal details
- Born: 27 April 1959 (age 67) Anambra State, Nigeria

Azikiwe Peter Onwualu (born April 27, 1959) is a Nigerian professor of Agricultural engineering and Director General and Chief Executive Officer of the Raw Materials Research and Development Council (RMRDC) of Nigeria from 2010 to his retirement in 2014.

== Life and career ==
He was born in Anambra State, eastern Nigeria, into the family of John Onwualu. He attended St. George's Primary School before he proceeded to Merchants of Light school in Anambra State, where he obtained the West Africa School Certificate (WASC) in 1977. He then attended the University of Nigeria, Nsukka where he obtained a bachelor's degree in Agricultural engineering in 1982. He later received a master's and Doctorate degrees in Agricultural engineering from the University of Nigeria, Nsukka and Dalhousie University respectively. He joined the services of the University of Nigeria, Nsukka as a lecturer 1 where he became a professor of Agricultural engineering in 1994. He has contributed significantly to Agricultural engineering in Nigeria with a special interest in Agro-processing Technology and Agricultural power.

Onwualu was a Graduate Assistant in 1983 at UNN and rose through the ranks to professor in 1999. He was Head, Agricultural Engineering Department, UNN (2000-2003), Director, Engineering Infrastructure, National Agency for Science and Engineering Infrastructure, NASENI, Abuja (2003-2005) and Director General, Raw Materials Research and Development Council (RMRDC), Abuja (2005-2013). He was a visiting professor at the National Universities Commission, Abuja, and currently Coordinator, Materials Science and Engineering Programme, African University of Science and Technology (AUST), Abuja. He was a Consultant to National Centre for Agricultural Mechanization (NCAM), Ilorin, Food and Agricultural Organization (FAO), United Nations Industrial Development Organisation (UNIDO), United Nations Development Programme (UNDP), Petroleum Trust Fund (PTF), etc. He was Coordinator, Science Technology and Innovation (STI) thematic group of Vision 20-2020, Chairman, Committee of Directors of Research Institutes of Nigeria (CODRI) (2010-2013), and Chairman, Steering Committee, Pan African Competitiveness Forum (PACF), Nigeria Chapter (2008-2013) and Focal Point (Africa), World Association of Industrial and Technological Research Organisations (WAITRO) 2010-2013. A professional Agricultural Engineer (COREN Reg), Onwualu's main areas of specialization are Agricultural Power and Machinery; Engineering Properties of Biomaterials; Processing of Agricultural and Food products; Technology, Innovation, Competitiveness, and Industrial Clusters and Renewable Energy Systems Applications. He is also an expert in soil-machine dynamics. He developed a novel research facility – a Computer-Controlled Soil Bin Test Facility to analyze forces and power requirements of tillage tools and traction devices. He developed computer-based numerical models for soil-machine dynamics. Other industrial projects completed under his supervision include design and development of planters, weeders, fertilizer spreaders, sprayers, and machines for processing cassava, rice, maize, potato, fruits, soya bean, cashew, ginger, biofuel, dryers, essential oil, wood seasoning kiln, shea butter, Moringa Olifera, vegetable oil, salt, talc, kaolin, gemstones, granite, and other minerals. Some of the results of these projects are currently being used by SMEs for commercial production. He is the initiator and former Coordinator of the Ward Based Cluster Project of the Federal Ministry of Science and Technology. The Project aims to use the Triple Helix Concept to drive Competitiveness in SMEs through the establishment of Innovation Based Clusters in every ward in Nigeria. He has to his credit 200 scientific publications, including 20 books. He was Editor-in-Chief (2003-2014) of Nigeria Journal of Agricultural Engineering and Technology, published by the Nigerian Institution of Agricultural Engineers (NIAE). Onwualu received the Federal Merit Award (1978-1982), the Engr. (Prof.) E. U. Odigboh prize for the first student of Agricultural Engineering to get a First Class Honours and Canadian International Development Agency (CIDA) Ph.D. grant. Over 60 organizations have recognized him with awards including Presidential merit award, Nigerian Society of Engineers (NSE); Individual Honours Award, Nigeria Society of Engineers, Abuja branch; Award of Excellence by Nigeria Institute of Physics, Most Distinguished Agricultural Engineer of the Year by NIAE and Professional Service Award by Rotary Club of Gwarimpa. Under his leadership, RMRDC won the National Productivity Order of Merit Award in 2009 and the Most Outstanding Public Institution in Service Delivery, 2012 by an Independent Monitoring Group. He is a Fellow of 12 professional bodies, including Polymer Institute of Nigeria, Agricultural Society of Nigeria, Materials Science and Technology Society of Nigeria, Nigerian Society of Engineers, Nigeria Academy of Engineering, Nigerian Institute of Management, and Nigeria Academy of Science. He is married to Mrs. Blessing Onwualu, and they have four children, Zimuzor, Chimobi, Chimdalu, and Onyedika. Currently, he doubles as the head of Material Science and Engineering Department and Academic Director at African University of Science and Technology (AUST), Abuja Nigeria.

== See also ==
- University of Nigeria, Nsukka
