= National Health Technology and Data Analytics Office =

Nigerian government office for digital health

Agency overview
- Formed: 26 June 2026
- Jurisdiction: Federal Government of Nigeria
- Headquarters: Abuja, Nigeria
- Agency executive: Obi Peter Adigwe, National Coordinator
- Parent agency: Office of the Coordinating Minister of Health and Social Welfare

The National Health Technology and Data Analytics Office (NHTDAO) is a Nigerian government office established in June 2026 to coordinate the country's digital health agenda. The office is domiciled in the Office of the Coordinating Minister of Health and Social Welfare and is responsible for coordinating digital health initiatives, promoting interoperability across health information systems, and supporting implementation of Nigeria's National Digital Health Architecture.

== History ==
The National Health Technology and Data Analytics Office was established on 26 June 2026 following approval by President Bola Tinubu. The establishment of the office was announced in a statement issued by the Presidency. Dr. Obi Peter Adigwe, Director-General of the National Institute for Pharmaceutical Research and Development (NIPRD), was appointed as the pioneer National Coordinator. According to the Presidency, the office was created as a national coordinating platform for digital health. It is intended to reinforce the statutory responsibilities of existing health institutions while harmonizing public and private digital health initiatives and operationalizing the National Digital Health Architecture approved by the National Council on Health in November 2025.

== Functions ==
The office is mandated to: Coordinate Nigeria's national digital health agenda, Promote interoperability among digital health platforms, Develop and implement standards for health information exchange, Support implementation of the National Digital Health Architecture, Facilitate collaboration between public and private stakeholders, Promote the use of health technology and data analytics to improve healthcare delivery.

== Governance ==
The office is headed by a National Coordinator. A Steering Committee provides strategic oversight and is co-chaired by the Coordinating Minister of Health and Social Welfare and the Chairman of the Nigerian Economic Summit Group. Membership also includes representatives of the Federal Ministry of Health and Social Welfare, the National Information Technology Development Agency, federal health agencies, state commissioners of health and industry stakeholders.

== See also ==
- Federal Ministry of Health and Social Welfare
- Digital health
- Health informatics
- National Information Technology Development Agency
