= ARCN =

ARCN is an acronym that may refer to

- Advertising Regulatory Council of Nigeria, formerly called the Advertising Practitioners Council of Nigeria, a regulatory body established by the Nigerian government to regulate and control advertising in Nigeria.
- Architects Registration Council of Nigeria, a statutory body tasked with regulating the architectural profession within Nigeria.
- Agricultural Research Council of Nigeria, a Nigerian government agency coordinating and monitoring agricultural research.
