= Ibrahim Hussaini Doko =

Nigerian lecturer and administrator

Director-General and Chief executive officer of the Raw Materials Research and Development Council Nigeria
- In office 2014
- Preceded by: Peter Azikiwe

Personal details
- Born: 24 September 1962 (age 63) Doko, Niger State
- Education: Ahmadu Bello University
- Occupation: Lecturer, Administrator

Ibrahim Hussaini Doko (born 24 September 1962) is a Nigerian academics, lecturer, administrator, and member of the Governing Board of the Raw Materials Research and Development Council, Nigeria. He is presently appointed as the director-general and chief executive officer of Raw Materials Research and Development Council, serving two terms from 2014 to 2019 and presently assumed office in April 2019. He replaced Peter Azikiwe Onwualu on his first appointment in 2014.

== Education ==
He attended Primary School, North Doko from 1968 and graduated from Government Secondary School, Kontagora in 1979 obtaining his West African Examination Certificate with an outstanding performance. He graduated from Ahmadu Bello University, Zaria in 1984 with BSc in Textile Science and Technology winning the Oba of Benin Prize for Best Final Year Student in the department due to his resounding performance, also holds a PhD of Textile Science and Technology in Leeds University in 1993.

He was also awarded British Council Academic Fellowship award in 1986, Commonwealth Scholarship Award in 1988 and was honoured Grand Commander of African Youths in African Youth Council in 2004.

== Career ==
Husseini was offered a job as an Graduate assistant in Ahmadu Bello University, Zaria after obtaining his National Youth Service Corps certificate in Borno State Council of Arts and Culture in 1985 and some years later he was made lecturer I. In 1993 he joined the Raw Materials Research and Development Council as a chief scientific officer and in 1996 he became head of division of the Chief Scientific Office.

He was later promoted to deputy director in charge of Research, Evaluation and Monitoring; at that position he was in charge of office Coordinating and Investment Promotion and Consultancy Departments office, and last post held before his appointed in 2013 as acting director was director in Charge of Industrial Chemicals and Mineral Department.

He was confirmed as director general by the Raw Materials Research and Development Council in March 2014, before that he has served in several committee's both inter ministerial and councils board amongst are;

- National Consultative Committee on the Industrialization of Scientific Research Result
- Federal Ministry of Science and Technology
- National Committee on Deletion Programme for Industrial Raw Materials *National Advisory Ozone Committee NAOCOM
- Secretary and Member, Committee of Directors Research Institutes (CODRI) Seminar and Technology shows and Inter Ministerial Technical Committee on Effective Application of R&D Findings and Results in Federal Ministry of Industry
- Member of Chartered Textile Technologist of Textile Institute; C. Text (A.T.I) United Kingdom
- Member of the Fellow, Institute of Management Consultants
- Member of the Fellow, Nigeria Institute of Management
- member of the Fellow, Institute of Corporate Administrator
- Fellow member of the Materials Society of Nigeria

== Personal life ==
He is married with five children.

== Publications ==
- Legendary strides of RMRDC @ 25 / editorial advisers. Raw Materials Research and Development Council, 2013. Ukim Ini, Asanga E. A, Mbuk M. I, Ibrahim, Hussaini D, Onwualu A. P. ISBN 978932250X, ISBN 9789789322503
- Policy brief on the production of cable in Nigeria; Online version. Government publication, National government publication. H D Ibrahim, Z Hammanga, B O Olugbemi, S L Wali, Fatima Ilyasu; Raw Materials Research and Development Council Nigeria. ISBN 9789785370249, ISBN 9785370240, OCLC 950473331, OCLC 113869795
- Policy brief on the production of kaolin in Nigeria, Government publication, National government publication. H D Ibrahim, Z Hammanga, B O Olugbemi, S L Wali, A B Isah; Raw Materials Research and Development Council (Nigeria), OCLC 1138697879. viii, 42 pages illustrations (chiefly color); 21cm. ISBN 9789785370379, ISBN 9785370372, OCLC 948726736.
