= Crin (disambiguation) =

A crin is another name for a crinoline, a petticoat designed to hold out a skirt.

Crin may refer to:

== Acronyms ==
- Child Rights Information Network
- Cocoa Research Institute of Nigeria

== People ==
- Crin Antonescu, Romanian politician
