= Lanre Issa-Onilu =

Nigerian communications strategist

Director-General of the National Orientation Agency
- Incumbent
- Assumed office 23 October 2023
- President: Bola Ahmed Tinubu

National Publicity Secretary of the All Progressives Congres
- In office 23 June 2018 – 25 June 2020
- Preceded by: Bolaji Abdullahi
- Succeeded by: Yekini Nabena (acting)

Personal details
- Born: Lanre Issa-Onilu Kwara State, Nigeria
- Education: University of Lagos; University of Ibadan
- Occupation: Public administrator Communications strategist Journalist
- Profession: Public relations

Mallam Lanre Issa-Onilu is a Nigerian communications strategist, journalist, and public administrator. He has served as the Director-General of the National Orientation Agency (NOA) since October 2023, following his appointment by President Bola Ahmed Tinubu. Prior to this appointment, he served as the National Publicity Secretary of the All Progressives Congress (APC) between 2018 and 2020.

== Early life and education ==
Lanre Issa-Onilu is from Kwara State, Nigeria. He earned his degree in Mass Communication at the University of Lagos and later obtained a postgraduate degree in Communication Arts from the University of Ibadan. He has also undertaken professional training in political communication and strategic communications.

== Career ==
=== Journalism and communications ===
Issa-Onilu worked in journalism and public relations before joining partisan politics. He worked with several Nigerian media organisations and was involved in communications consulting and public affairs.

=== Political career ===
In August 2018, Issa-Onilu was elected National Publicity Secretary of the All Progressives Congress (APC) during the party's national convention. He served as the party's chief spokesperson until 2020, when a caretaker committee assumed leadership of the party. During his tenure, he represented the party on public policy issues and electoral matters.

=== Director-General, National Orientation Agency ===
On 23 October 2023, President Bola Tinubu appointed Issa-Onilu as the Director-General of the National Orientation Agency (Nigeria) (NOA). The agency is responsible for public enlightenment, civic education, national values promotion, and communicating government policies to the public.

=== Political aspirations ===
In 2026, Issa-Onilu declared his intention to run for the All Progressives Congress (APC) gubernatorial ticket in the 2027 Kwara State governorship election.
