= Sheda Science and Technology Complex =

Nigerian Government Agency

Coordinates: 8.856889°N 7.044046°E

The Sheda Science and Technology Complex (SHESTCO) is a parastatal under the Nigerian Ministry of Science & Technology. It is a multidisciplinary research and development establishment located in Kwali Area Council about 70 km from Abuja, Nigeria.

SHESTCO was established by the Federal Government of Nigeria in 1993. The complex has five (5) well-equipped advanced research centres; Biotechnology, Chemistry, Physics, Mathematics and a Nuclear Technology Centre with a gamma irradiation plant. SHESTCO houses and collaborates with the Nigerian branch of the American-based company Xechem Pharmaceuticals. The agency may have developed a commercially viable product with nicosan, for the management of Sickle cell anemia. Xechem Pharmaceuticals Nigeria is assisting in research, production, marketing and sales of nicosan, and is planning to further explore the biodiversity of Nigeria and other African Countries for natural drugs to combat malaria, cancer and other diseases.

Although Nigeria does not yet have any commercial production of biotechnology crops, SHESTCO has the capacity to conduct and apply biotechnology research. In February 2009 IBM stated they had plans to build a production plant for computer software and hardware in Nigeria. SHESTCO was directed to provide necessary facilities. At a scientific roundtable organized by SHESTCO in August 2010, Education Minister Rukayyatu Ahmed-Rufai said Nigeria had to invest in Research and Development (R&D) to narrow the gap with the developed countries. The Director General of SHESTCO, Sunday Thomas, expressed his concern about the decreasing funding for R&D in Nigeria.

== See also ==
Official website
