= Yau Usman Idris =

Nigerian nuclear physicist

Dr. Usman Idris Director General ( CEO ) Nigerian Nuclear Regulatory Authority ( NNRA)
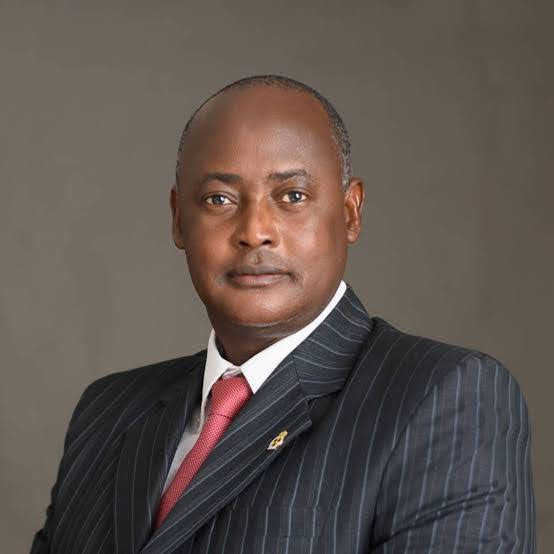
- Usman Idris
- Born: Kauru, Kaduna State, Nigeria
- Education: Ahmadu Bello University, Zaria; University of Ibadan; University of Maiduguri
- Organization: Nigerian Nuclear Regulatory Authority (NNRA)
- Predecessor: S.B. Elegba; Alhaji Jafaru Abubakar; Rabi'u Nasiru
- Website: nnra.gov.ng

Yau Usman Idris is a Nigerian nuclear physicist and the current director general (CEO) of the Nigerian Nuclear Regulatory Authority (NNRA). He was appointed by Muhammadu Buhari, President of the Federal Republic of Nigeria.

== Early life and education ==
Idris was born in Kauru, Local Government Area of Kaduna State. He obtained his BSc in physics at the University of Maiduguri in 1988, M.Sc. in physics at the University of Ibadan in 1992, and PhD in nuclear physics at Ahmadu Bello University, Zaria in 1998.

He also obtained a certificate in BPTC - reactor safety, nuclear technology from Korea Institute of Nuclear Safety, South Korea in 2013. Another certificate was also obtained from Argonne National Laboratory, Chicago, Illinois in nuclear power plant development in 2009.

== Career ==
Idris worked in various places nationally and internationally in the field of nuclear and now is the director general of the Nigerian Nuclear Regulatory Authority (NNRA).

He was appointed as commissioner for Environment and Natural Resources by the Kaduna State Governor, Nasiru Ahmed El-rufai from August 2015 to February 2016.

He was then a lecturer researcher, Ahmadu Bello University, Zaria from 1999 to April 2004, and then lecturer researcher, Department of Physics, University of Maiduguri from 1989 to 1999.

Moreover, in the international responsibility of nuclear safety, he is a vice chairman of the Forum of Nuclear Regulatory Bodies in Africa (FNRA), African Regional Co-ordinator of the International Atomic Energy Agency (IAEA), Advisory Board Member of the African Nuclear Business Platform (AFNBP), and Co-ordinator of the Website of the Forum of Nuclear Regulatory Bodies in Africa (FNRBA).

== Controversy ==
Dr Ya'u Usman Idris in the year 2022 and 2023 financial records has uncovered ₦6,688,904,707.35 nearly ₦6.7 billion in contract fraud and procurement violations spread across twelve separate findings, making it one of the largest concentration of irregularity documented.

== Award and membership ==
He has received several awards such as international Leadership Gold Award for Excellent, Nigerian Self-service Gold Award (NISSGA) and Legends' Noble Award

Membership of professional association

He is the secretary of the Forum of Nuclear Regulatory Body in Africa (FNRBA), advisory board member for African Nuclear Business Platform ( AFNBP), member Forum of Nuclear Regulatory Body in Africa (FNRBA), Nigerian Society for Radiation Protection (NSRP), Member Nigerian Institute of Physics (MNIP), and member, Material Society of Nigeria (MMSN)

== Personal life ==
He is married with children.

== See also ==
- Heat energy
- Nuclear energy policy by country
- Nuclear reactor
- Nuclear weapon
- Radiation
