= Akintunde Sawyerr =

Nigerian diplomat (born 1964)

Akintunde Oluwole Sawyerr
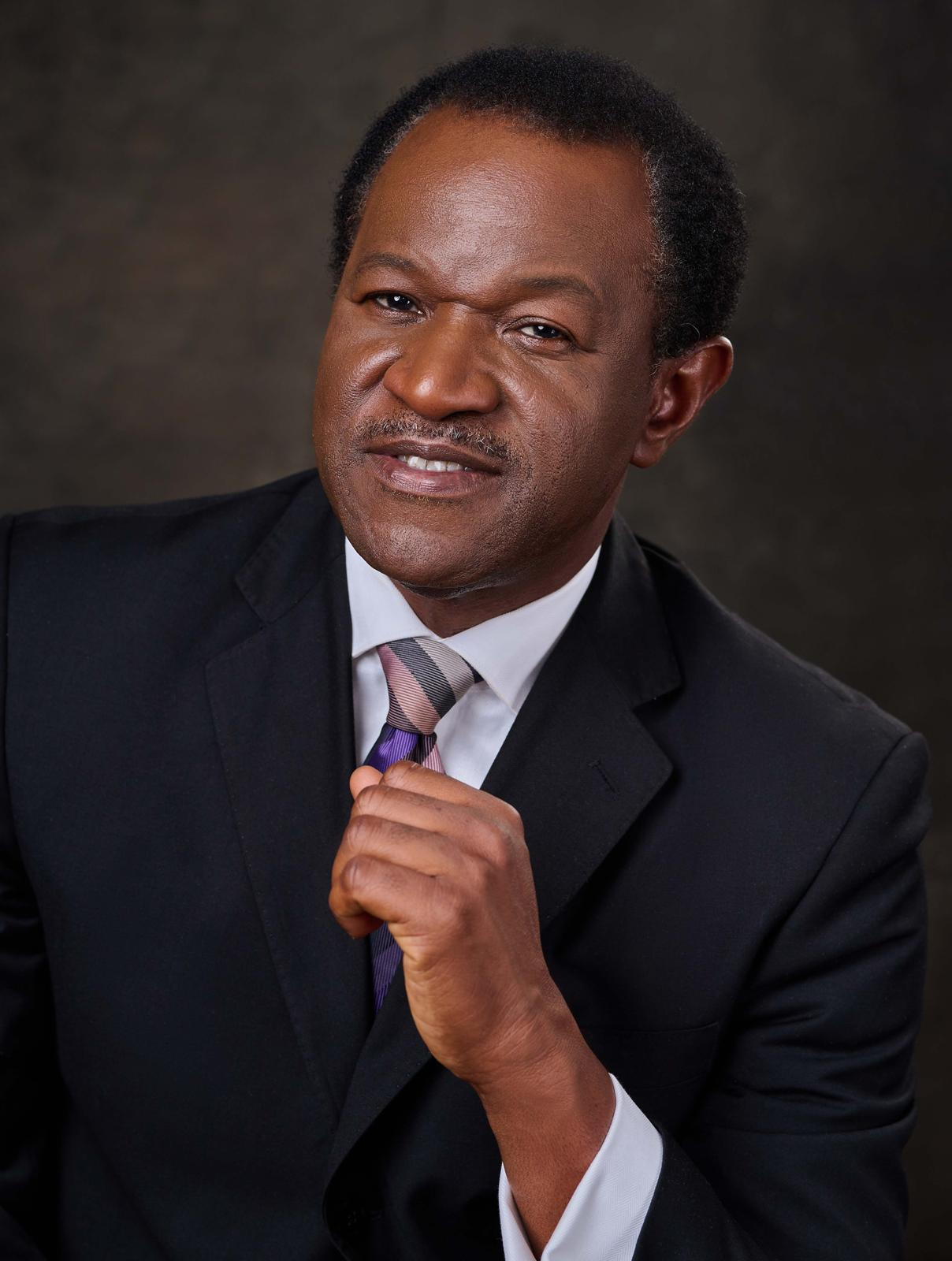

1st Managing Director of Nigerian Education Loan Fund | NELFUND
- Incumbent
- Assumed office 3 April 2024
- President: Bola Tinubu

Personal details
- Born: Akintunde Oluwole Sawyerr; 6 October 1964 (age 61) London, England
- Education: University of London (BSc, Chemistry)
- Alma mater: Royal Russell School; Igbobi College
- Occupation: Diplomat

Akintunde Oluwole Sawyerr (born 6 October 1964) is a Nigerian diplomat with a background in logistics, healthcare, and agricultural development. In April 2024, he was appointed managing director of the Nigerian Education Loan Fund (NELFUND) by President Bola Tinubu.

== Early life and education ==
Akintunde Sawyerr was born on 6 October 1964 in London. His educational journey began at Igbobi College in Lagos, Nigeria followed by the Royal Russell School in the United Kingdom. He then pursued higher education at the University of London, earning a BSc in Chemistry.

== Career ==
Sawyerr has worked in roles related to supply chain management and logistics. From 2013 to 2018, he was the Head of Sub-Saharan Africa at Medtronic. In 2010, he served as an International Advisor for the Supply Chain and Logistics Group (SCLG.

In 2009, Sawyerr became Director for Sub-Saharan Africa at EBRAM Investments. In 2007, he was responsible for managing operations across 21 countries in the Middle East, North Africa, and Turkey for DHL. That same year, he also served as Head of Supply Chain for London at DHL EXEL Supply Chain.
