= National Research Institute for Chemical Technology =

Research agency in Nigeria

The National Research Institute for Chemical Technology (NARICT) is a parastatal under Nigeria Federal Ministry of Science and Technology. It is located in Basawa, Zaria, Kaduna State.

== Research Departments ==
The institute presently has four research departments involved in renewable energy research, catalysis, and treatment of industrial effluent waste.

The departments are :

- Basic Research
- Petrochemical and Allied
- Industrial and Environmental Technology Department
- Textile Technology Department.

== Analytical equipment and laboratories ==
NARICT's laboratories contain analytical equipment such as GCMS, AAS, LCMS, BET surface area analyzer, DTGA, SEM, FTIR and HPLC to name a few.

== Leadership ==
The Current Director General/CEO of the institute is Professor Jeff Barminas. Formally resuming office on 27 May 2017.
