= Nigerian Copyright Commission =

Established under section 34 of the Copyright Act (Cap C28, Laws of the Federation of Nigeria, 2004) the Nigerian Copyright Commission was inaugurated on 19 August 1989, first as the Nigerian Copyright Council. It was elevated to the status of a commission in April 1996 and this administrative change was confirmed by the Copyright (Amendment) Decree 1999.

== Statutory duties ==
The commission is the government agency responsible for all copyright matters in Nigeria including the administration, regulation, enforcement and prosecution under the Copyright Act. Its statutory authority includes:

- (a) responsibility for all matters affecting copyright in Nigeria as provided for in the Act;
- (b) monitoring and supervising Nigeria's position in relation to international conventions and advising Government thereon;
- (c) advising and regulating conditions for the conclusion of bilateral and multilateral agreements between Nigeria and any other country;
- (d) enlightening and informing the public on matters relating to copyright;
- (e) maintaining an effective data bank on authors and their works;
- (f) responsibility for such other matters as relate to copyright in Nigeria as the Minister may, from time to time, direct.

The commission is also charged with the following statutory responsibilities under the Copyright Act:

- (a) the certification of countries that are parties to treaty obligations for the purpose of determining whether a copyright work may enjoy copyright by virtue of such international obligation. Such a certificate is conclusive proof of that fact. (Section 5)
- (b) the regulation of the conditions for the exercise of the right of an author of graphic works, three-dimensional works and manuscripts to share in the proceeds of any sale of that work or manuscript by public auction or through a dealer. (Section 13)
- (c) the issuance of exemption certificate for the purpose of enabling an otherwise unapproved collecting society to commence action for the infringement of copyright or any right under the Copyright Act. (Section 17)
- (d) the prescription of anti-piracy devices for use on, in, or in connection with any work in which copyright subsists. (Section 21)
- (e) the authorisation of the reproduction, communication to the public and adaptation of expressions of folklore for commercial purposes outside their traditional or customary contexts. (Section 31)
- (f) the granting of compulsory licences in accordance with the provisions of the Fourth Schedule to the Act as well as the establishment and regulation of the Copyright Licensing Panel. (Section 37)
- (g) the appointment of copyright inspectors as it may deem fit. (Section 38)
- (h) the approval and regulation of collecting societies for the purpose of the Copyright Act. (Section 39)
- (i) the receipt and disbursement of funds arising from the imposition of compulsory levy on copyright materials. (Section 40)
- (j) the regulation of the conditions necessary for the operation of a business involving the production, public exhibition, hiring or rental of any work in which copyright subsists under the Act. (Section 45(1)
- (k) the carrying out of such directives of a general or special character with respect to its functions as the Minister may give. (Section 50)

== Composition of the Governing Board ==
The commission is supervised by a Governing Board established under section 35 of the Act and constituted as follows:

- (a) a Chairman, who shall be a person knowledgeable in copyright matters, to be appointed by the President on the recommendation of the Minister;
- (b) the Director-General of the commission;
- (c) one representative of the Federal Ministry of Justice;
- (d) one representative of the Federal Ministry Education;
- (e) one representative of the Nigeria Police Force, not below the rank of a Commissioner of Police;
- (f) one representative of the Nigeria Customs Service, not below the rank of a Comptroller of Customs;
- (g) six other persons, to be appointed by the Minister, who shall represent as far as possible the authors in the following areas–

- (i) literary works;
- (ii) Artistic works;
- (iii) Musical works;
- (iv) Cinematograph films;
- (v) Sound recordings; and
- (vi) Broadcasts.

The representatives of the Ministries are required to be officers not below the rank of director and the board is at liberty to adopt its own rules of procedure and method of operation. The day-to-day administration of the commission is under a director general who is designated as the chief executive of the commission. The Director General is appointed by the president on the recommendation of the minister. He is to serve for a four-year term, after which he or she may seek for a renewal of the appointment.

The current Director General is Dr. John Asein.

== Management structure ==
The commission has eight departments each of which is headed by a director. The departments are:

- Enforcement
- Prosecution and Legal
- Administration
- Finance and Accounts
- Public Affairs
- Planning, Research and Statistics
- Regulatory
- the Lagos Office constitutes an eighth department

There is, in addition, a Copyright Institute.

== Functions ==
Functions carried out by the different departments in fulfillment of its statutory duties include the following:

=== Enforcement Department ===
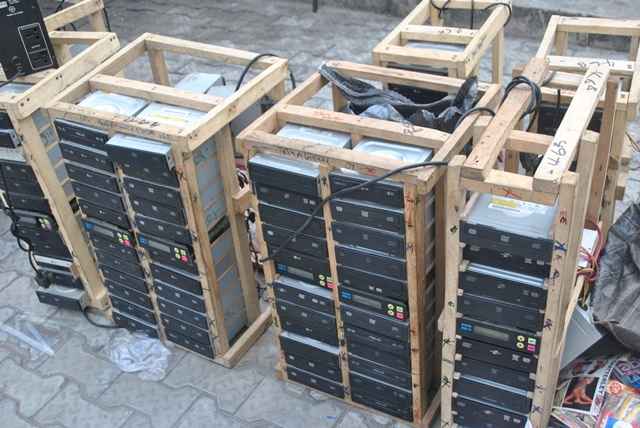
DVD duplication equipment seized by the Nigerian Copyright Commission

This Department is responsible for enforcing the Copyright Act. The Act provides for criminal violation of the law. These are offences which are punishable by terms of imprisonment in most cases. Any person who violates these provision will be investigated by operatives of the Commission called Copyright Inspectors. The copyright inspectors have power to inspect premises which they reasonably suspect are being used for the commission of an offence, enter such premises, arrest the suspects, request the suspect to provide relevant pictures, data or other information, seize pirated works and prosecute the offenders. Over the years, these officers had carried out several investigations, arrest many suspects, and seized much pirated material. Many suspected pirates have also been prosecuted and some convicted.

In carrying out its enforcement activities, the Commission collaborate with many stakeholders including copyright owners, owner associations, other government agencies and sister law-enforcement agencies. Copyright owners provide relevant information on piracy activities in the industry which help the commission to identify and investigate suspected pirates. Where there is relevant information, the suspect is arrested and pirated works are seized. in carrying out these arrests, the commission works with the Nigerian Police or other sister law enforcement agencies that carry firearms, since operatives of the commission are not armed. Between January 2011 and the 3rd quarter of 2017, the Commission conducted a total of 600 anti-piracy surveillances, carried out 327 anti-piracy operations, arrested 711 suspects and seized 9,306,316 copies of pirated works, which is valued at N9,509,467,010.00. The seized pirated works included 28 containers of pirated books, VCDs and DVDs which were seized at the Apapa and Tin Can seaports in collaboration with Nigerian Customs as they were being imported into Nigeria. Within the period the commission also achieved 28 conviction at the Federal High Court.

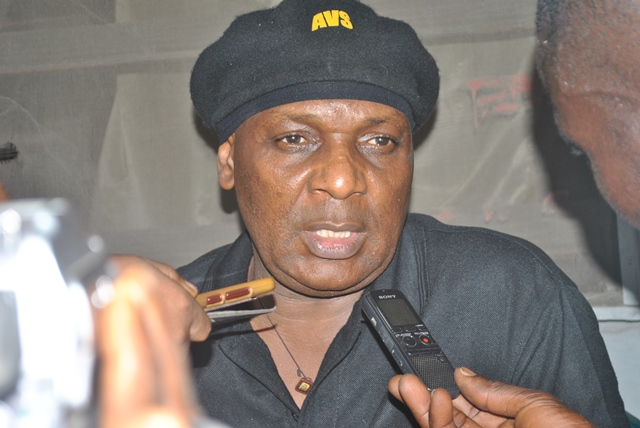
Igwe Gad Okoye (Gaboski) a prominent film maker and distributor in Nigeria addressing the press after an anti-piracy operation carried out by Nigerian Copyright Commission

In year 2012, the Commission carried out a public burning of seven hundred and twenty two million (722,000,000) units of seized pirated copyright works and contrivances estimated at six billion, five hundred million Naira(N6,500,000,000), comprising literary, musical, film works and contrivances, including those from the broadcast industries. This public burning was carried out in Lagos. In addition, ten million and fifty thousand (10,050,000) assorted confiscated pirated copyright works and contrivances seized from Kaduna State, Kano State and environs, with an estimated market value of one billion four hundred million Naira (N1, 400,000,000) were publicly destroyed by burning in Kaduna on 22 October 2015. Similarly, seventeen million, two hundred and sixty six thousand, one hundred and eighty seven (17,266,187) units of pirated copyright works and contrivances seized from Enugu State, Abia State and environs with an estimated market value of two billion, four hundred million Naira (N2,400,000,000.00) was destroyed publicly by burning in Enugu on 2 March 2016. Due to environmental issues, most of the destruction of pirated works presently are not carried out by burning.

In 2025, the Commission suspended online Nigerian domain names engaged in large-scale piracy and the distribution of copyrighted sound recordings and other creative works. This was done through the Commission’s Special Taskforce against Online Piracy (STOP) in collaboration with the International Federation of the Phonographic Industry (IFPI) and the Nigerian Internet Registration Association (NiRA), who had formally requested the suspension.

=== Prosecution Department ===
This department is responsible for prosecuting suspected offenders where the investigation into an allegation disclose a good ground to prosecute the offenders. After an investigation by the Enforcement Department, the investigation file is sent to them for review. In reviewing an investigation, they work closely with the operatives that investigated the offence and may require that further investigation activity is carried out in any file before prosecution. They may also advice that the investigation did not disclose required information for prosecution in which case the investigation will be closed. Over the years, many suspected pirates have been successfully prosecuted.

=== Administration Department ===
This department is responsible for all administrative and human resources issues of the commission. they handle employment, promotion, transfer, discipline and termination of employment; all welfare matters; maintenance of office equipment etc.

=== Public Affairs Department ===
This department oversee all issues of public relations. they manage the media and all other publications including online resources

=== Planning Research and Statistics Department ===
This department is responsible for handling all issues of planning, research and statistics as the name implies. this include the annual budget and other periodic reports issued by the commission. This department also takes charge of the secretariat of the commission's management board.

=== Finance and Account Department ===
This Department is responsible for all financial and accounting issues.

== Office locations ==
The commission's head office is located at the Federal Secretariat Phase 1, Annex 2, Ground Floor, Shehu Shagari Way, Central Business District, Abuja, Nigeria. It also has offices in 14 states of the Federation. The towns where these offices are located in:

- Lagos
- Ibadan
- Ilorin
- Kaduna
- Kano
- Yola
- Bauchi
- Enugu
- Onitsha
- Benin
- Uyo
- Port Harcourt
- Markudi
- Owerri
