= National Orientation Agency (Nigeria) =

Propaganda agency in Nigeria

- Formation: 23 August 1993
- Purpose: Communicating government policy, promoting patriotism and providing a feedback channel on the mood/pulse of the Nigerian society to government
- Headquarters: Abuja, FCT
- Official language: English
- Director-General: Mallam Lanre Issa-Onilu
- Website: http://www.noa.gov.ng/

The National Orientation Agency of Nigeria is the body tasked with communicating government policy, staying abreast of public opinion, and promoting patriotism, national unity, and development of Nigerian society. The motto on its website states: "Do the right thing: transform Nigeria." Its specific objectives were set out in Decree 100 of 1993.

== History ==
The National Orientation Agency has worked on a variety of issues, including health, cooperation with non-governmental organizations, and prevention of electoral violence.

Dr. Mike Omeri was appointed Director General of the Agency on 16 January 2012. In Director General Omeri's 2014 New Year message, he "urged Nigerians to increase their faith in the country this year" and expressed "appreciation to the people for standing by the government and the nation throughout the year 2014 especially in the war against insurgency."

Dr. Omeri's 2014 announcement of a policy of "rehabilitaton" and reintegration of Boko Haram militants into Nigerian society met with criticism in neighboring Cameroon, with one opposition MP remarking,

“for a country that is yet to organise a state funeral for soldiers killed by the Boko Haram terrorists to start invoking the de-radicalisation and rehabilitation concepts is completely unacceptable”.

2,167 repentant Boko Haram members have been rehabilitated and have graduated from the National Orientation Agency's Operation Safe Corridor’s (OPSC) which is a programme meant for the deradicalisation, rehabilitation and reintegration (DRR) of terrorists. The graduates of the programme are made up of 2140 Nigerians and 27 others from Chad, Cameroon and Niger.

== See also ==
- List of Nigerian agencies
