= Nicosan =

Nicosan, also known as Hemoxin, Niprisan, or Nix-0699, is a phytochemical mixture which was studied in sickle-cell disease (SCD). As of 2017 it does not appear to be commercially available, as the only manufacturer, which was in Nigeria, has stopped producing it due to financial problems.

== Medical uses ==
There is tentative evidence that it may be useful in sickle-cell disease. It however does not appear to affect overall complications or rates of anemia.

== Chemistry ==
It is an ethanol/water extract of Piper guineense seeds, Pterocarpus osum stem, Eugenia caryophyllus fruit, and Sorghum bicolor leaves.

== History ==
It was developed at the Nigerian National Institute for Pharmaceutical Research and Development (NIPRD) (U.S. Patent # 5,800,819 - September 1, 1998). NIPRD has conducted Phase III clinical trials in Nigeria which showed unclear benefits but have not been published as of 2010.

In August 2002, a Nigerian subsidiary of the American company Xechem International, acquired the rights to Nicosan. On July 6, 2006, the drug was announced in Nigeria, with the president of Nigeria, Olusegun Obasanjo, in attendance. In 2008, a fraud complaint alleged that Nigerian public money was spent on the drug. Xechem International went bankrupt in 2008 and production of the drug stopped.
