= John Asein =

Nigerian lawyer and consultant

Dr. John Asein
- Citizenship: Nigeria
- Education: University of Calabar University of Lagos, University of Abuja University of New Hampshire School of Law
- Occupations: Lawyer, author, consultant
- Organization: Nigerian Copyright Commission World Intellectual Property Organization

John O. Asein is a Nigerian lawyer, author and consultant. He is currently the Director General of the Nigerian Copyright Commission, reappointed 12 January 2023.

== Early life and education ==
In 1984, he obtained his bachelor's degree from the University of Calabar, graduating as the overall best. In 1992, he earned a master's degree from University of Lagos, and an additional master's degree in Intellectual Property from the Franklin Pierce Law Center, United States, in 1997. He further obtained a doctorate degree in Intellectual Property from the University of Abuja.

== Career ==
Asein coordinates the project for the Ford Foundation/NCC study of piracy in Nigeria. This is in addition to his role as a consultant to the World Intellectual Property Organization (WIPO). In 1995, he served on the UNESCO African Regional Committee for the teaching of copyright at the university level. He is a scholar and research fellow to several international institutions including the Max- Planck Institute for Intellectual Property, Competition and Tax Law, Germany.

He was appointed as Director General of the Nigerian Copyright Commission in 2019, and reappointed in 2023 by President Muhammadu Buhari.

In commemoration of the World Book Day 2025, he urged for an increased partnership and collaboration to boost Nigeria's reading culture. Over the years, he has continued to advocate and support trainings on law and copyright policy, and its enforcement in Nigeria. In 2021, he tasked the appointed copyright ambassadors to uphold innovation and creativity.
