= National Veterinary Research Institute =

Nigerian Research Institute

National veterinary Research Institute
- Established: 1924
- Focus: Poultry, Vaccine Research
- Chair: Maryam Muhammad
- Owner: Federal Government of Nigeria
- Location: Vom, Plateau State, Nigeria
- Website: https://www.nvri.gov.ng/

The National Veterinary Research Institute (NVRI) is a research institute in Nigeria that was established in 1924 and has the mandate to conduct research into how to ably identify, treat and control animal diseases as well as the development of vaccines for such training and the provision of support services to livestock and poultry farmers. The institute is under the supervision of the Federal Ministry of Agriculture and Rural Development. The chief executive is Maryam Muhammad, a veterinary doctor with research interests in the molecular epidemiology of Salmonella in poultry, public health and environment and development.

== History ==
The National Veterinary Research Institute (NVRI) was established in 1924 to eradicate the outbreak of rinderpest that was rampant among cattle in Nigeria and West Africa between 1885 and 1890 and again between 1913 and 1914. In 1913, a veterinary department was established in Zaria with the main purpose of conducting livestock census, surveying and verifying the outbreak of diseases among livestock and controlling the spread of such through isolation and quarantine. The department worked closely with village heads and the Native Authority Administration. In 1924, the department was moved to Vom, in the present-day Plateau State where it became a veterinary laboratory. In the same year, the laboratory was able to produce an anti-rinderpest hyper-immune serum and has become the hub for veterinary research and the production of veterinary drugs and vaccines for in-country animal populations and transboundary animal diseases in West Africa. In 1975, the Agricultural Research Institute Decree 35 came on board and the name was changed to National Veterinary Research Institute (NVRI).

It was not until 1967 that the next batch of veterinary graduates emerged from the joint effort of Ahmadu Bello University and University of Ibadan which were the first schools for full veterinary medicine in Nigeria.

== Functions ==
The priority areas of research in NVRI are avian influenza, rabies, brucellosis. salmonellosis and transboundary animal diseases such as contagious bovine pleuropneumonia, foot-and-mouth disease and Newcastle disease, The institute also provides support services to poultry and livestock farmers.

NVRI is the foremost and only veterinary research institute in Nigeria with the mandate to conduct research into all aspects of animal diseases, develop and produce animal vaccines; provide surveillance and diagnosis of animal diseases; and provide extension services to poultry and livestock farmers.

=== Laboratory services ===
The NVRI laboratory is made up of the central diagnostic laboratory in Vom and a network of laboratories in 23 outstations in Nigeria. It also hosts the FAO (Food and Agriculture Organization) regional laboratory for transboundary animal diseases, including avian influenza for West and Central Africa. The institute also has a biotechnology laboratory complex that is equipped with a range of facilities including PCR, qPCR, and tissue culture facilities; a BSL-3 facility that was chosen as one of the network of laboratories for confirmation of suspected cases of COVID-19; and a BSL-2 laboratory suite used solely for FMD and animal influenza research.

=== Training ===
NVRI began a veterinary school in 1945 for the training of veterinary assistants. In 1963, the curriculum of the veterinary school was expanded and a new course, Diploma in Animal Health and Husbandry, was introduced. In 1980, the school became the College of Animal Health and Husbandry and has courses in Ordinary Diploma and Higher Diploma in animal health and husbandry. In 1989, the National Board for Technical Education (NBTE) gave the college accreditation to run National Diploma (ND) programmes in animal health and production and for Higher National Diploma (HND) programmes in 1992. The college had been renamed Federal College of Animal Health and Production Technology, the name it currently bears, in 1991. Presently, the school in affiliation with Abubakar Tafawa Balewa University, Bauchi, also offers degree programmes in agricultural science (animal production) as well as a postgraduate diploma in animal health and production.

=== Research ===
The institute carries out research in different areas as pertains to the health of livestock. In 2022, together with the Pirbright Institute and the Royal Veterinary College, London, NVRI researched on how to reduce and eradicate sheeppox and goatpox. Data was collected about the risk factors associated with the disease, hot-spots of occurrence were identified, economic impact estimated and a tool was developed (SGP cost and vaccination calculator) to help herders understand the importance of vaccination against the disease. The viral research section concentrates on diseases of livestock such as cattle, sheep, goats, poultry, pigs, dogs, cats, and rabbits that have a viral origin. The diseases include but are not limited to African swine fever, foot-and-mouth disease, Newcastle disease, Gumboro disease, parainfluenza virus, egg drop syndrome, capripox and rabies.

=== Vaccine production ===
The NVRI Bacterial Vaccine Division is in charge of the production of bacterial vaccines such as anthrax spore vaccine, Black Quarter vaccine, BruceIla vaccine (S.19), contagious bovine pleuro-pneumonia vaccine, haemorrhagic septicaemia vaccine, fowl cholera vaccine, fowl typhoid vaccine and HantaVac used for immunization of livestock. The Viral Vaccine Division has the mandate to produce vaccines against viral diseases that inflict livestock and poultry. These include fowlpox, infectious bursal disease vaccine, rabies, Peste des Petits Ruminant (PPR) vaccine and thermostable Newcastle disease vaccine (Strain I2) among others.

The Federal Ministry of Agriculture and Rural Development had rated the pace of production of vaccines by NVRI as slow and not enough to fully combat pests that are attacking livestock in the country. Stakeholders in the veterinary sector including the Nigerian Veterinary Medical Association and Smallholder Poultry Forum had advised on the need to privatise vaccine production in NVRI.

In 2022, the Federal Government of Nigeria had announced plans to begin the production of COVID-19 vaccine in NVRI.
