= National Economic Reconstruction Fund =

Nigerian financial institution

National Economic Reconstruction Fund (NERFUND) was a Nigerian financial institution established to support indigenous micro, small and medium scale industrial enterprises through the provision of medium to long term financing.

It was established in 1989, by the NERFUND Act, cap.254. Years later, the merger of the mandates of Nigerian Industrial Development Bank, Nigerian Bank for Commerce and Industry and the National Economic Reconstruction Fund led to the establishment of Bank of Industry in 2001.

== Closure ==
As of 2013, it was reported that NERFUND ran at huge losses up to N5.7 billion. As of 2017, NERFUND had N17.5bn in bad loans. After a special assessment report by the Nigeria Deposit Insurance Corporation and the Central Bank of Nigeria, Mahmoud Isa-Dutse, the Permanent Secretary, Federal Ministry of Finance announced the closure of NERFUND stating it was too expensive to run, it has a bad balance sheet, salary expenses and overheads.
