= Agricultural Research Council of Nigeria =

Nigerian government agency

Agricultural Research Council of Nigeria (ARCN)
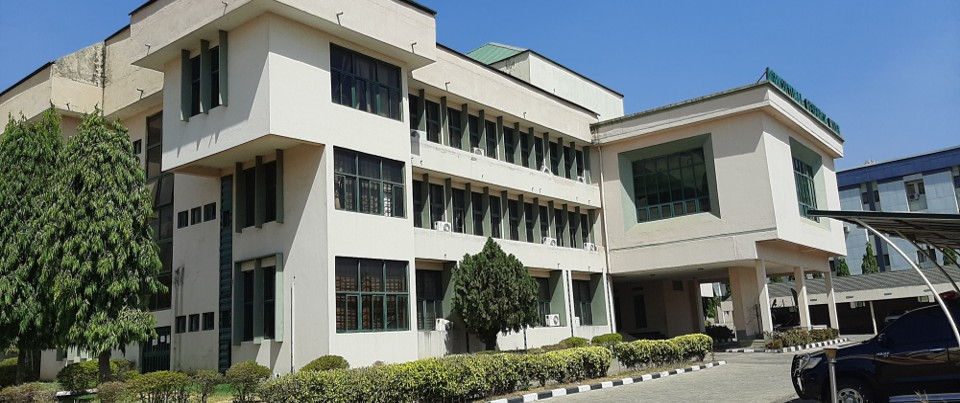
- ARCN Headquarters the Agricultural Research House

Agency overview
- Formed: 1999
- Headquarters: Agricultural Research House, Plot 223D Cadastral Zone B6, Mabushi, Abuja Nigeria
- Website: https://arcn.gov.ng/

The Agricultural Research Council of Nigeria (ARCN) is a Nigerian government agency with perpetual succession, established as a Grade 'A' parastatal under the Federal Ministry of Agriculture and Food Security. It serves as the apex organization responsible for coordinating, managing, and regulating agricultural research in Nigeria. ARCN oversees a network of national agricultural research institutes and collaborates with stakeholders to enhance agricultural productivity and food security. The Council coordinates and monitors agricultural research to increase agricultural productivity for economic development. The agency also trains farmers, for instance through television and radio programs.

== History of Agricultural Research in Nigeria ==
Agricultural research in Nigeria began in the late 19th century with the establishment of a botanical garden in Lagos. However, the coordination of research centers and institutes remained a persistent challenge. The botanical garden was part of a network of gardens established under British colonial rule, primarily focused on introducing new crops. In 1903, the Forestry and Botanical Department (later renamed the Agricultural Department) for Southern Nigeria was created. By 1912, this department was divided into two regional entities, leading to the establishment of a separate Department of Agriculture for Northern Nigeria. Following Nigeria's unification in 1914, the two departments were merged to form a unified Department of Agriculture.

=== Early Developments (1914–1960) ===
Significant progress was made in infrastructure and human resources during this period, with the establishment of new research stations, an increase in research personnel, and the development of more technical research programs. These programs included plant breeding and plant pathology, though the focus remained on export crops such as oil palm, rubber, cotton, and cocoa. The Forestry and Veterinary Departments were also established in 1914 but began research activities only in 1920. Fishery research emerged later, in 1941, with the creation of the Fisheries Development Branch under the Department of Agriculture.

Until World War II, agricultural research was primarily managed by the local colonial government. However, the British government's increased interest in promoting science and technology in its colonies led to the establishment of several regional agricultural research organizations in West Africa. These organizations, part of the West African Inter-territorial Research Organisation (WAIFRO), complemented or partially replaced existing facilities. Three key institutes were located in Nigeria:

- The West African Institute for Oil Palm Research (WAIFOR)
- The West African Institute for Trypanosomiasis Research (WAITR)
- The West African Stored Products Research Unit (WASPRU)

Following Nigeria's independence in 1960, these regional institutes were nationalized, leading to the creation of:

- The Nigerian Institute for Oil Palm Research (NIFOR)
- The Nigerian Institute for Trypanosomiasis Research (NITR)
- The Nigerian Stored Products Research Institute (NSPRI)
- The Cocoa Research Institute of Nigeria (CRIN)

=== Post-Independence Era (1960–1980) ===
After independence, research activities were regionalized, reducing federal government involvement. However, the regional efforts failed to yield the expected results, prompting the federal government to intervene in the 1960s. This period saw significant reorganization and expansion of research institutes in the 1970s. The Agricultural Research Council of Nigeria (ARCN) was established under Decree 25 of 1971. However, the first ARCN, along with other sectoral councils, was abolished in 1977 and replaced by the Nigerian Science and Technology Development Agency. Further changes occurred in 1980 with the Research Institutes Establishment Order, which upgraded many research stations and departments to national institutes.

=== Green Revolution and Reorganization (1980–1999) ===
The research institutes underwent further reorganization during the Green Revolution program of the early 1980s, including a review of their mandates. Coordination changes continued under military regimes. The Agricultural Sciences Department (ASD), initially under the Federal Ministry of Science and Technology, was transferred to the National Agency for Science and Engineering Infrastructure (NASENI). In 1992, the government recognized the need to realign agricultural research with the Federal Ministry of Agriculture. Consequently, the ASD and 15 Agricultural Research Institutes were formally reintegrated into the ministry. However, the ASD's bureaucratic structure hindered effective coordination, leading to systemic challenges.

=== Modern Era (1999–Present) ===
In 1999, the Federal Military Government signed the Agricultural Research Council of Nigeria Decree No. 44, reestablishing the ARCN. However, its implementation was delayed as the government prioritized other initiatives, such as the Presidential Initiatives and the National Special Programme on Food Security. During the Presidential Retreat on Agriculture and Food Security in December 2005, weak linkages between research and agricultural production were identified as a major constraint. This led to the formation of a Presidential Advisory Committee (PAC) on Improving Linkages between Research and Production, with the following terms of reference:

- Identifying constraints and limitations on linkages
- Recommending strategies to enhance public-private partnerships in research
- Proposing strategies to strengthen research-production linkages
- Identifying roles of key stakeholders
- Setting targets for research institutes and streamlining their functions

The PAC submitted its report in July 2006, leading to the establishment of the Presidential Implementation Committee on Improving Linkages between Research and Production in August 2006. This committee, chaired by the Honourable Minister of Agriculture, included deputy governors and other stakeholders. Its mandate was to ensure the systematic implementation of the PAC's recommendations and provide quarterly progress reports to the Presidential Forum.

In November 2006, the committee presented its first quarterly report, recommending the immediate operationalization of the ARCN as the global best practice for coordinating and supervising agricultural research. Consequently, an Executive Secretary for the ARCN was appointed in November 2006.

== Legal Provisions of ARCN ==
The Agricultural Research Council of Nigeria (ARCN) was established by Decree 44 of 1999, now an Act of the National Assembly. The decree was published as Extra-ordinary Government Notice No. 78 of 26 May 1999, vol. 86. In September 2021, the Council’s Principal Act, Cap. A12, under the Laws of the Federation of Nigeria, 2004, was amended to reconstitute the board's membership and make provisions for the effective operation of the Council.

== Mandate of ARCN ==
The ARCN is mandated to plan, manage, coordinate, supervise, and regulate agricultural research, training, and extension in the under-listed National Agricultural Research Institutes (NARIs) and Federal Colleges of Agriculture (FCAs).

=== Functions of the Council ===
- Advise the Federal Government on national policies and priorities in agricultural research, training and extension activities;
- Plan, manage, conduct and promote research, human resource development and technology generation, assessment and adoption for the advancement of all aspects of agriculture in Nigeria;
- Prepare periodic master plans for agricultural research, training and extension and advise the Federal Government on the financial requirement for the implementation of such plans;
- Ensure the implementation of the approved master plans by the appropriate research institutes, universities and other bodies;
- Participate through a consultative process in the appointment of directors of agricultural research institutes established under university statutes;
- Prescribe and give policy direction to the Federal Colleges of Agriculture on their overall management function, training and extension activities;
- Supervise research, training and extension activities of research institutes established under section 17 of this Act;
- Prepare the annual budget for agricultural research, training and extension programmes of the institutes under its aegis and receive grants for allocation to the institutes for the implementation of the annual programmes and to universities and other bodies for special research or training projects;
- maintain an up-to-date record of all existing facilities for research, training and extension in the agricultural sciences in Nigeria and advise the Federal Government on their adequacy and efficient utilisation;
- advise the Federal Government on the re-organisation of existing institutes, including the creation of new ones, as are required to implement or further the efficiency of research, training and extension in the agricultural sciences;
- promote collaboration between scientists engaged in research, training and extension in the agricultural sciences in Nigeria and their counterparts in other countries or international bodies;
- establish and maintain a National Agricultural Science Library and Documentation Centre and publish or sponsor the publication of research results in the agricultural sciences; and
- carry out such activities as may be deemed by the Council to further the advancement of research, training and extension in the agricultural sciences.

== Organizational Structure ==
The Agricultural Research Council of Nigeria operates through a streamlined framework comprising six technical departments (Planning, Research & Statistics; Plant Resources; Livestock; Fisheries & Aquaculture; Agricultural Extension & Socio-Economics; and Knowledge Management & Communications) and two service departments (Administration and Finance & Accounts). These departments collectively support the Council's research mandate and strategic objectives in agricultural development.

The Office of the Executive Secretary provides central leadership with eight specialized units: Anticorruption & Transparency Unit, Budget Unit, Protocol & Media Unit, Gender and Youth in Agricultural Research & Innovation, National Center of Specialization in Aquaculture, SERVICOM, Legal Unit, and Procurement Unit, alongside Internal Audit Unit and Linkages Committee which facilitates Local and International Collaboration. This administrative structure ensures effective governance, compliance with regulations, and strategic coordination of the Council's nationwide activities.

With this governance structure, the Council facilitates last-mile delivery and the development of demand-driven agricultural technologies and practices. To fulfill its core mandate, the Council oversees 16 National Agricultural Research Institutes, along with more than 16 Federal Colleges of Agriculture and related disciplines (FCAs), ensuring a robust framework for agricultural innovation and capacity building.

=== List of National Agricultural Research Institutes (NARIs) and Federal Colleges of Agriculture (FCAs) Under ARCN ===
Below are tables of research institutes and federal colleges of agriculture overseen by the Agricultural Research Council of Nigeria (ARCN), including their websites, states, and zones

Institute	Website	State	Zone
Cocoa Research Institute of Nigeria, Ibadan	www.crin.gov.ng	Oyo	South-West
National Root Crops Research Institute, Umudike	www.nrcri.gov.ng	Abia	South-East
National Cereals Research Institute, Badeggi	www.ncribadeggi.gov.ng	Niger	North-Central
National Animal Production and Research Institute, Zaria	www.napri.gov.ng	Kaduna	North-West
National Horticultural Research Institute, Ibadan	www.nihort.gov.ng	Oyo	South-West
National Institute for Fresh Fisheries Research, New Bussa	niffrng.org	Niger	North-Central
National Agricultural Extension Research Liaison Services, Zaria	www.naerls.gov.ng	Kaduna	North-West
National Veterinary Research Institute, Vom	www.nvri.gov.ng	Plateau	North-Central
Nigerian Institute for Oceanography and Marine Research, Lagos	www.niomr.gov.ng	Lagos	South-West
Nigerian Institute for Oil Palm Research, Benin	www.nifor.gov.ng	Edo	South-South
Nigerian Stored Products Research Institute, Ilorin	www.nspri-ng.org	Kwara	North-Central
Institute of Agricultural Research and Training, Ibadan	www.iart.gov.ng	Oyo	South-West
Institute for Agricultural Research, Zaria	www.iar.samaru.org	Kaduna	North-West
Lake Chad Research Institute, Maiduguri		Borno	North-East
Rubber Research Institute of Nigeria, Benin City		Edo	South-South
National Centre for Agricultural Mechanization		Kwara	North-Central

College	Website	State	Zone
Fed College of Animal Health & Production Technology, Ibadan	www.fcahptib.edu.ng	Oyo	South-West
Fed College of Horticulture, Dadin Kowa	www.fchdt.org.ng	Gombe	North-East
Fed College of Animal Health & Production Technology, Vom		Plateau	North-Central
Fed College of Freshwater, Fisheries Technology, New Bussa		Niger	North-Central
Fed College of Freshwater Fisheries, Baga		Borno	North-East
Fed College of Fisheries and Marine Technology, Lagos	www.fcfmt.edu.ng	Lagos	South-West
Fed College of Agriculture, Akure	www.feca.edu.ng	Ondo	South-West
Fed College of Agriculture, Ibadan	www.fcaib.edu.ng	Oyo	South-West
Fed College of Agriculture, Ishiagu	www.fcaishiagu.edu	Ebonyi	South-East
Fed College of Produce Inspection & Stored Products Tech, Kano		Kano	North-West
Fed College of Veterinary & Medical Laboratory Technology, Vom	www.fcvmlt.edu.ng	Plateau	North-Central
Fed College of Land Resource Technology, Owerri	www.fecolartow.ng	Imo	South-East
Fed College of Land Resource Technology, Kuru		Plateau	North-Central
Fed Co-operative College Oji-River	www.fccojiriver.edu.ng	Enugu	South-East
Fed Co-operative College Ibadan		Oyo	South-West
Fed Co-operative College Kaduna		Kaduna	North-West

== Activities ==
The Council under the leadership of the Executive Secretary, Dr. Adamu Abubakar Dabban, represents Nigeria on the Board of Trustees of the African Agricultural Technology Foundation, an organization that works towards improving food security prospects in the continent through agricultural technology and giving support to farmers and governments in Sub-Saharan Africa to more easily access tools and resources that will give them a competitive edge in the 21st century agriculture markets.

=== Recruiting ===
In January 2024, 1,650 new scientists joined the services of the ARCN to make more research on food security in order to reduce food scarcity in the country. The ARCN has responsibility for training and extension activities.

=== Quickly maturing crops ===
The secretary of the ARCN has urged the federal government to work more on the production of quickly maturing crops in order to facilitate the production of food and reduce food scarcity.

=== Radio and television ===
In 2021, the agency inaugurated Agricultural Radio and Television to disseminate information to farmers more effectively.

== Transformation ==
In January 2024, the Nigerian federal government announced a transformation of the ARCN and all its affiliations. It was declared by the Minister of Agriculture.
