= Nigerian Press Council =

The Nigerian Press Council (NPC) is the statutory body that governs ethical standards in the Nigerian Press. It was established by the Nigerian Press Council Act No. 85 of 1992 (as amended in Act 60 of 1999)

== Function ==
The Nigerian Press Council is a Parastatal that was created to ensure ethical press standards and to maintain high professional standards for the Nigerian Press. Like most other Press Councils around the world. Part of the functions of the Nigerian Press Council revolves around ethical standards. through thorough research, proper training of journalists, accreditation of programmes in tertiary institutions amongst others.

== Executive Secretary / CEO ==
The current Executive Secretary / CEO of Nigerian Press Council (NPC) is Dr. Dili Ezughah.

Nze Dr. Dili Ezughah, D.Min, DD, Fnipr, FIPMA, arpa, FARSt, FicPAN is a media and communication expert and cultural advocate, noted for his contributions to Nigeria's academic, journalistic, and socio-political landscape. During a career spanning more than 40 years, Dr. Ezughah has worked in the practice, management, and teaching of journalism, public relations, and media relations across government, corporate, and academic settings. His career reflects a broad interdisciplinary impact across these sectors.

A prolific scholar and practitioner, Dr. Ezughah's academic work spans artificial intelligence, theatre criticism, and cultural communication. His recent publications include a co-authored chapter in Applied Theatre and Development Communication in Nigeria. In 2025, he joined Bingham University as a visiting Lecturer at the Department of Mass Communications.

Currently serving as the Executive Secretary and CEO of the Nigerian Press Council, as well as an Executive Member of the National Communications Team, Dr. Ezughah has extensive experience in media regulation, press freedom advocacy, and policy formulation. His work has focused on promoting ethical journalism and supporting media development in Nigeria.

== History Nigerian Press Council ==
The push towards a regulatory body to oversee the press began during the regimes of Yakubu Gowon and Ibrahim Babangida under strong opposition from professionals who advocated an independent body rather than a committee set up by government.

== Roles ==
The Nigerian Press Council is mandated to:

- Uphold ethical and professional standards in the media
- Investigate complaints against the Press
- Monitor activities of the press
- Research on contemporary Press development
- Investigate obstacles to the flow of information
- protect the rights and privileges of journalists

== Controversy ==
According to a publication in The Guardian (Nigeria), The Reps tackle The Nigerian press council over alleged N8.301m contract irregularities. The House of Representatives Committee on Public Accounts has accused the Nigerian Press Council (NPC) of fraudulently spending N8.301 million for renovating its building in Abuja. At an investigative hearing, sequel to queries of the office of the Auditor-General of the Federation (AGF), the committee chairman, Hon. Kingsley Chinda, also accused the council of engaging an insurance broker for N5.118 million without due process.

The discoveries, among others, followed queries on the NPC by the Attorney-General of the Federation for the year ended December 31, 2011. The AGF had, in the complaints it forwarded to the committee, urged the parliament to investigate the N8.301 contract awarded without backing, such as letter of engagement, evidence of contract advertisement and genuineness of the contractor.

== Operations ==
The Council board is headed by a chairman who is appointed by the President and 18 other members selected from the following body:

Organization	Number of members
Nigeria Union of Journalists (NUJ)	4
Nigerian Guild of Editors (NGE)	2
Newspaper Proprietors’ Association of Nigeria	2
The Broadcasting Organisation of Nigeria	-
News Agency of Nigeria	-
Federal Ministry of Information	1
General Public	2
