= Nigerian Integrated Water Resources Commission =

The Nigerian Integrated Water Resources Commission (NIWRC) is the agency established to regulate water resources in Nigeria.

== History ==
Since 2020, there have been several controversies against the passing of the National Water Resources Bill. Most of the rejection around the bill was based on its requirement for individuals to obtain license before they can access drill water which the populace believed should be free. Part of the bill states that:

This Bill seeks to establish a Regulatory framework for Trans Boundary Water Resources in Nigeria, provide for the equitable and sustainable development, management, use and conservation of Nigeria’s Inter-State surface Water and Groundwater Resources.

— National Water Resources Bill,

== Functions ==
The functions of NIWRC includes but are not limited to the following:

- issue water use licenses
- put indiscriminate drilling of boreholes in check
- avoid pollution of ground water sources
- implement and enforce water law
- manage bodies of water
