= Federal College of Animal Health and Production Technology, Vom =

Agricultural university in Nigeria

Federal College of Animal Health and Production Technology, vom
- Type: Public
- Established: 1941
- Location: Jos South, Nigeria; 9.7651°N 8.8142°E
- Website: https://portal.fcahptvom.edu.ng/

Federal College of Animal Health and Production Technology, Vom is one of the Federal Colleges of Agriculture in Nigeria. It is located within The National Veterinary Research Institute (NVRI), Vom, Jos South LGA, Plateau State, Nigeria. It is saddled with training of middle level manpower in Animal Health, Animal Production, Livestock Extension/ Management Services and Vocational Training who could effectively utilize their training to establish and manage livestock farms.nt

== Brief history ==
The College was established in 1941, as a Veterinary School, Vom, with a total of ten students. Some of these are, are registered as Veterinary Assistants (junior course), Veterinary Assistants (senior course) and others as Veterinary Officers.

The School has the credit of being the first Higher Institution in West Africa to produce graduate Veterinary Surgeons long before the first University was established in Nigeria, at Ibadan in 1948. The school also played a key role, especially between 1947 and 1962, in training middle-level veterinary manpower for other African Countries, notably the Cameroons, Liberia, Ghana, Sierra Leone, Gambia, Ethiopia and Sudan.

On the establishment of University College at Ibadan now known as University of Ibadan, it was recommended that the higher training to the Veterinary Officers’ level be consigned to the University. Consequently, the Veterinary School, Vom, discontinued the Veterinary Officers’ course in June 1950, and thereafter concentrated entirely on running only one course, namely a 2-year Veterinary Assistants’ Course. In March 1980, the Veterinary School was formally accorded a college status and renamed College of Animal Health and Husbandry with a mandate to award Ordinary and Higher Diplomas.

The National Science and Technology Amendment Decree No. 46 of 30 December 1990, gave legal backing to the Research Institute to conduct training for the technicians and technologists for the award of National Diploma (ND), Higher National Diploma (HND) and Certificates.

However, with the approval granted to the College by the NBTE in 1989 and 1992, for National Diploma (ND) programmes in Animal Health and Production and the Higher National Diploma (HND) in Animal Health respectively a set of students were enrolled.

In 1990, the National Science and Technology Amendment Decree No. 46 of 30 December, gave legal backing to the Research Institute to conduct training for the technicians and technologists for the award of National Diploma (ND), Higher National Diploma (HND) and Certificates. It will be mentioned that the College was again renamed the Federal College of Animal Health and Production Technology on 29 January 1991.

In 2014, the department of Veterinary Science Laboratory Technology (VSLT) was established with options in Veterinary Microbiology, Pathology, Radiology and Anaesthesiology. In 2021, the department graduated and inducted 162 maiden graduands of Veterinary Laboratory Technology and Animal Health Technology into the Veterinary Council of Nigeria (VCN), as professional para-veterinarians.

== Geography ==
The College is located in Vom, a quiet rocky village in Plateau State, and situated 1,285 metres above sea level. The nearest towns are Bukuru and Jos, 12.8 and 24 kilometers, to the north-east respectively.

Largely because of its altitude and constant winds, Vom has a remarkably cool climate. In December and January, the nights may be very cold. The wet season extends from late April to middle October.

=== Philosophy of the College ===
The philosophy of the College centres around three guiding principles, which are

1. To improve steadily the service to the livestock sector of the agricultural economy through effective training of suitable candidates.
2. To train the mind to appreciate the significance of animal resources in national development.
3. To inculcate in trainees the importance of practical self-commitment to the dignity of labour as a sound logical basis for attaining national self-sufficiency in animal protein production.

== Objectives ==
1. To provide technical manpower in the area of Animal Health and Production Technology.
2. To provide knowledge and skills essential for livestock development projects.
3. To produce extension staff that should be able to bring the result of agro-veterinary research and innovations to the livestock farmer and feed back the farmers’ problems to the appropriate authorities for solutions.
4. To provide men and women, knowledgeable in the field of animal production who could effectively utilize their training to establish and manage their own livestock farms to maximum advantage. Primarily, the College aims at producing job-providers not job-seekers.

== College Academic Calendar ==
The college has two semesters in a session, each semester consists of 15 to 17 weeks.

1st Semester	Begins October – March
End of 1st Semester:	March – April
2nd Semester:	Begins April – September
End of 2nd Semester	September - October

=== Academic Programmes ===
The college offers programs (1-5) and short courses (6 & 7) namely:

1. Preliminary National Diploma in Science and Technology (1 year).
2. National Diploma (ND) in Animal Health and Production Technology (2 years)
3. Higher National Diploma (HND) in Animal Health (2 years).
4. Higher National Diploma (HND) in Animal Production (2 years).
5. Higher National Diploma (HND) in Agricultural Extension and Management (2 years)
6. Certificate Programme (6 months) in:-
  1. Beef production
  2. Poultry production
7. Vocational Training (6 weeks) in:-
  1. Beef Production
  2. Poultry production
  3. Animal fattening
