= National Institute for Pharmaceutical Research and Development =

Government agency in Nigeria

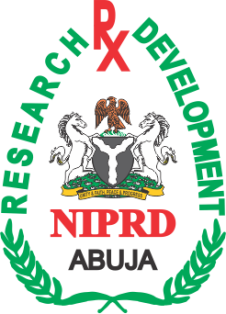
- Abbreviation: NIPRD
- Founded: 1987
- Headquarters: Abuja, FCT, Nigeria
- Coordinates: 9.0475°N 7.3415°E
- Official language: English
- Parent organization: Federal Ministry of Health
- Website: https://www.niprd.gov.ng

The National Institute for Pharmaceutical Research and Development (NIPRD) is a Nigerian institution charged with developing drugs, biological products, and pharmaceutical raw materials, conducting quality-assurance tests, research for locally manufactured medicines, and constituting guidelines for their production. Founded in 1987, it was a parastatal under the Federal Ministry of Science and Technology. In 2001, it was moved to Federal Ministry of Health.

== History ==
- In August 2018, NIPRD got ISO/IEC 17025 accreditation for meeting international standards for testing medicines, food, cosmetics, agricultural products, and herbal products.
- In July 2019, under the leadership of Dr. Obi Peter Adigwe, NIPRD announced that they had developed six traditional herbal products for the treatment and management of Ebola, malaria, sickle cell anaemia and other diseases.
- In August 2021, African Export-Import Bank awarded $400,000 grants to NIPRD to boost local production of active pharmaceutical ingredients.
- In April 2022, the NIPRD signed a Memorandum of Understanding with the University of KwaZulu-Natal, South Africa, to improve the industry value chain for traditional medicine in Nigeria and Africa.
- In August 2022, the NIPRD constituted a Disease Detection and Prevention Consortium along with University of Sheffield, Usman Danfodiyo University and the West African Health Organization.

== Major drug developments ==
=== Niprisan ===
The NIPRD produces Niprisan for the management of sickle cell disorders. It is commercialized as Niclovix. Niprisan is a phytochemical formulated from parts of four different indigenous plants (Piper guineense seeds, Pterocarpus osun stem, Eugenia caryophyllus fruit and Sorghum bicolor leaves). In June 2018, May & Baker signed a production agreement with NIPRD for the commercialization of Niprisan in Nigeria.

In July 2022, The Director-General of NIPRD, Dr. Obi Peter Adigwe, announced that more than 40 countries buy Niprisan from Nigeria.

=== Niprimune ===
In March 2020, under the directive of the Federal Government, the NIPRD started developing models to identify herbal medicines to combat COVID-19. By early 2021, NIPRD had discovered Niprimune, a locally made phytomedicine as an adjunct for the management of COVID-19 and was approved by the National Agency for Food and Drug Administration and Control (NAFDAC). The Institute had decried lack of funding to advance its production and further research.

== Controversies ==
- In 2015, Premium Times reported that the then Director General, Prof Karniyus Gamaniel, was violating civil service rules by refusing to advertise available vacancies but instead sharing slots and conducting shabby interviews leading to job racketeering in the institution. In a follow-up report, Gamaniel said the vacancies were not advertised because the candidates were selected from an existing database of applicants from previous job adverts.
- In April 2016, the then Director General, Prof Karniyus Gamaniel, was reported to Economic and Financial Crimes Commission, and the Independent Corrupt Practices Commission for allegedly embezzling $514,000.36 out of a $744,000.38 World Bank grant given to develop anti-diabetic phytomedicine, also known as STEP-B Project, and another N33 million meant for the payment of the salaries of NIPRD's staff in 2014. Gamaniel denied the allegations.

== See also ==
- Obi Peter Adigwe
