= Nigerian Institute for Oceanography and Marine Research =

Federal Government Agency

- Abbreviation: NIOMR

Agency overview
- Formed: 1975

Jurisdictional structure
- Federal agency (Operations jurisdiction): Nigeria
- Operations jurisdiction: Nigeria
- Legal jurisdiction: Nigerian Institute for Oceanography and Marine Research
- Governing body: President of Nigeria
- Constituting instrument: Act 2007
- General nature: Federal law enforcement

Operational structure
- Headquarters: 3 Wilmot Point Road, Off Ahmadu Bello Way, Victoria Island, Lagos State, Nigeria
- Agency executive: Sule Abiodun Ph.D., Managing Director/Chief Executive

Website
- https://niomr.gov.ng/

The Nigerian Institute for Oceanography and Marine Research is a Nigerian government agency responsible for the rational exploitation of marine resources, conservation for sustainable development, and maintenance of a healthy marine environment.

== History ==
NIOMR is a Nigerian government agency Rational Exploitation of Marine Resources and Conservation for Sustainable Development and Healthy Marine Environment and monitoring marine research institute in Nigeria, established in 1975.

The agency was previously under the Ministry of Science and Technology before being moved to the Ministry of Agriculture and currently under the Ministry of Blue Economy.

== Activities ==
Through a wide range of research activities, the Institute aims to advance marine sciences and promote the sustainable use of Nigeria’s marine resources. NIOMR also offers consultancy services, marineculture, fisheries technology and marine meteorology.

== Branches ==
The Institute’s headquarters are situated on Wilmot Point Road, a side street off Ahmadu Bello Way, on Victoria Island in Lagos. It also maintains branch offices in Buguma (Rivers State), Aluu (Rivers State), Sapele (Delta State) and Badore (Lagos).

== Areas of specialisation ==
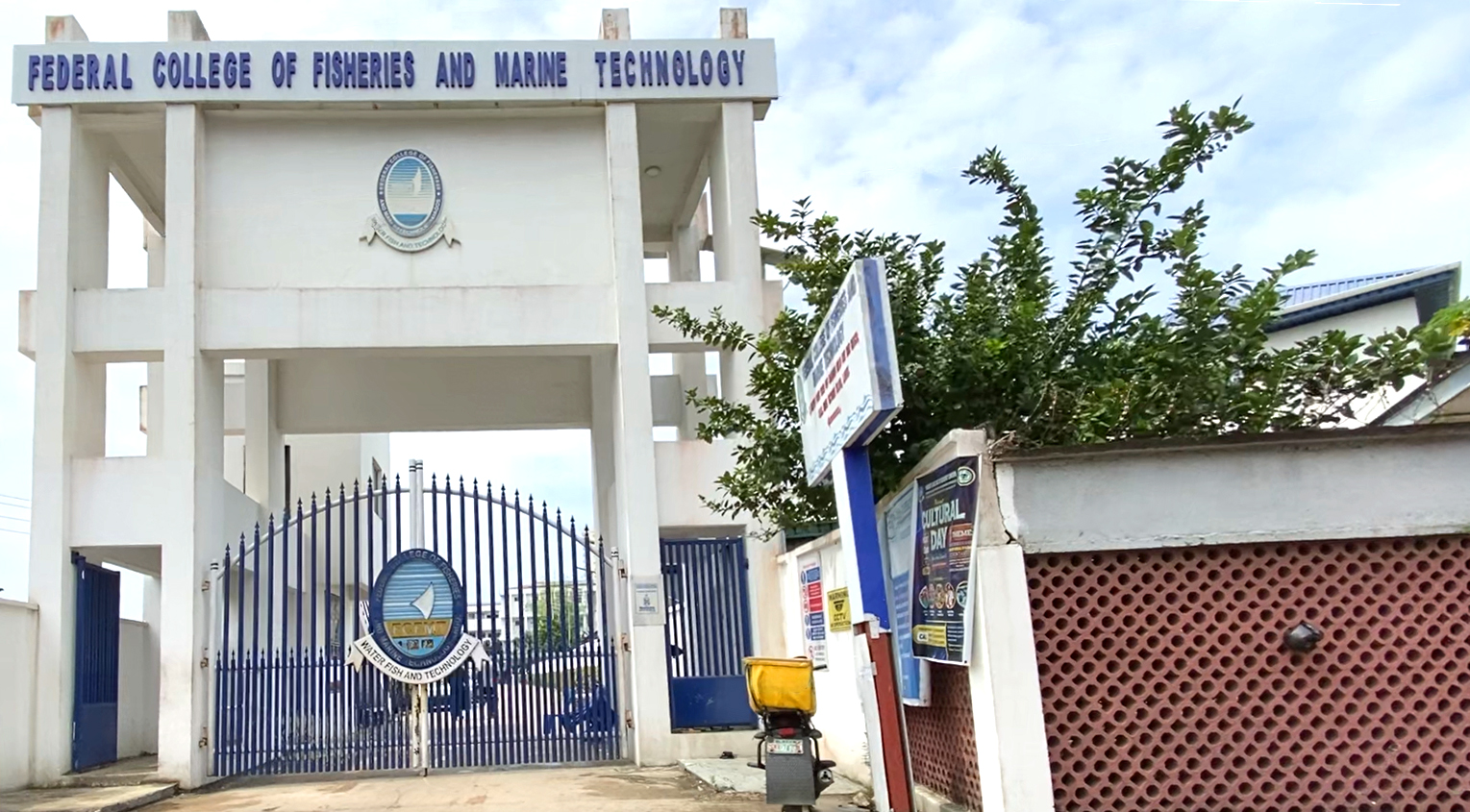
The NIOMR (entrance)

The Institute’s main research departments are: Aquaculture, Biological Oceanography, Biotechnology, Fisheries Resources, Fish Technology and Product Development, Physical and Chemical Oceanography, Marine Geology/Geophysics, African Regional Aquaculture Centre (ARAC), Advisory Services, Mariculture, Fisheries Engineering and Safety, and Marine Meteorology and Safety.

In addition, there are service departments and divisions, including: Administration, Finance and Accounting, Information and Documentation, Planning, Technical Services, and NIOMR Consult.
