= Nigerian Education Loan Fund =

Student Loan in Nigeria

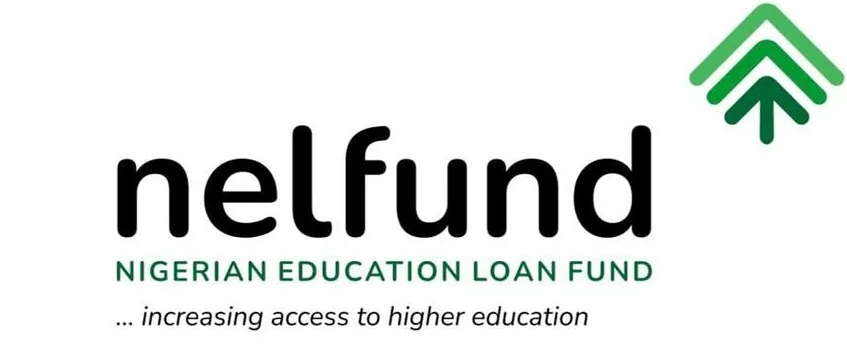

Educational Agency overview
- Formed: 3 April 2024
- Jurisdiction: Federal government of Nigeria
- Headquarters: Abuja
- Educational Agency executive: Akintunde Sawyerr, Managing Director

The Nigerian Education Loan Fund (NELFUND) is a pivotal financial institution established under the Student Loans (Access to Higher Education) (Repeal and Re-enactment) Act, 2024. It was signed into law by President Bola Tinubu on 3 April 2024, marking a historic step towards ensuring sustainable higher education and functional skill development for Nigerian students and young people.

== Background ==
The NELFUND was created to address the shortcomings of the previous Student Loan Act of 2023, which faced challenges related to governance, management, loan purposes, eligibility criteria, application methods, repayment provisions, and loan recovery.

== Objectives ==
The primary objective of NELFUND is to provide financial support to qualified Nigerians for tuition and other fees, charges, and upkeep during their studies in approved tertiary academic institutions and vocational and skills acquisition institutions within Nigeria.

== Structure and governance ==
NELFUND operates as a body corporate with the power to sue and be sued, acquire, hold, and dispose of property for its functions. It is governed by a board of directors comprising representatives from relevant ministries, regulatory bodies, and participating agencies, including the Federal Ministries of Finance and Education, among others. The management operations are distinct from governance functions, with a management team led by a managing director, Akintunde Sawyerr responsible for the day-to-day operations.

NELFUND introduced an online portal in 2024 to streamline student loan application processes, offering detailed guidelines, eligibility criteria, and required documentation for transparency and accessibility.

Additionally, NELFUND introduced a student loan repayment strategy with flexible plans based on graduates' income levels, grace periods before repayment starts, and loan consolidation options. This approach aims to ease the financial burden on graduates and improve loan recovery rates.

== Disbursement ==
On 23 August 2024, the management of NELFUND published the list of institutions that received tuition fee payments for students in their respective institutions. It showed that the sum of N2,946,927,155 had been disbursed to 19 institutions across the country with 27,667 students benefiting.

The 19 institutions that received the payment on behalf of their students are:

- University of Maiduguri: N589,001,500
- University of Ibadan: N201,114,650
- University of Ilorin: N52,897,890
- University of Benin: N24,412,500
- Federal University, Dutsin-Ma: N304,961,800
- Bayero University, Kano: N853,775,000
- Federal College of Education, Abeokuta: N1,945,700
- Federal University of Technology, Minna: N62,928,600
- Obafemi Awolowo University, Ile Ife: N50,414,000
- Federal Polytechnic, Ilaro: N8,347,465
- University of Lagos: N122,494,400
- University of Jos: N209,320,000
- Federal College of Education (Technical), Gusau: N15,600,200
- Federal College of Education (Special), Oyo: N18,502,500
- Federal University, Dutse: N207,106,000
- Federal University, Birnin-Kebbi: N130,002,800
- Modibbo Adama University, Adamawa: N83,837,850
- Federal Polytechnic, Bauchi: N7,218,800
- Federal Polytechnic, Mubi: N2,045,500

On 6 September 2024, the loan agency announced that it has disbursed the sum of N2,416,183,516.80 to additional 40 institutions to bring the total disbursements to institutions to 59. On 17 February 2025, the agency disclosed that it paid N22,736,960,971 as institutional loan for 215,514 students at the end of 2023/2024 academic session.
