= Obi Peter Adigwe =

Nigerian pharmacist

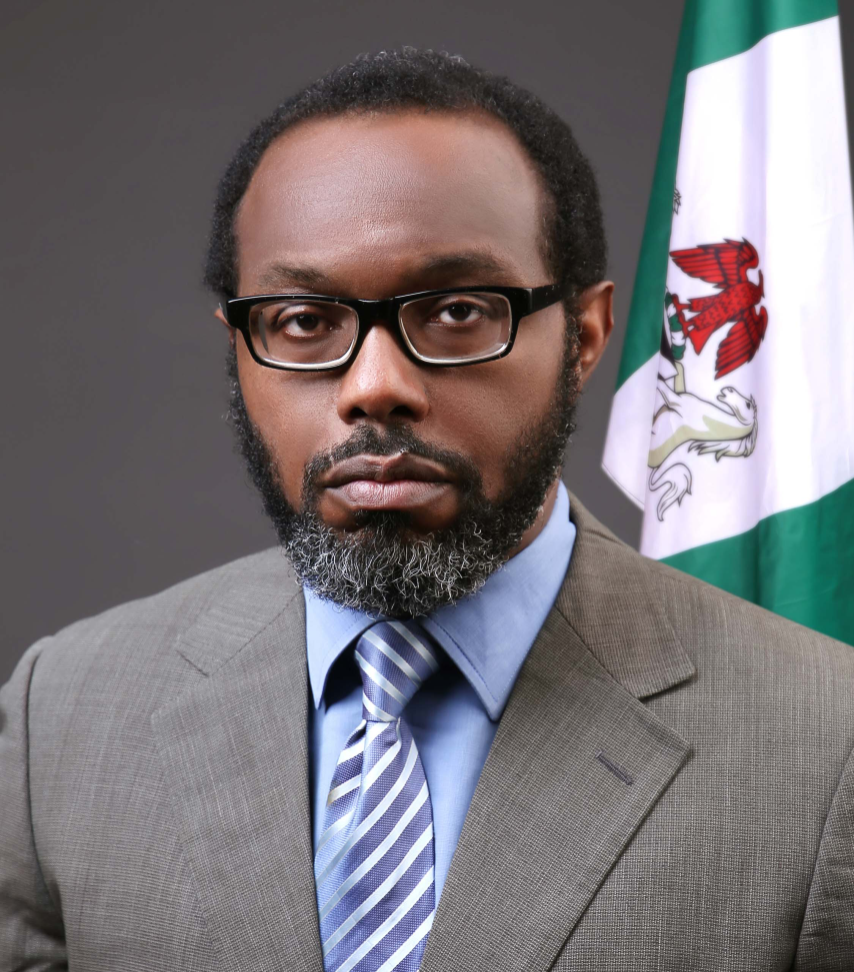
- Portrait of Adigwe

National Coordinator, National Health Technology & Data Analytics Office
- Incumbent
- Assumed office 16 September 2026
- Appointed by: Bola Tinubu
- Preceded by: Pioneer National Coordinator

Personal details
- Education: University of Jos; University of Edinburgh; University of Leeds

Obi Peter Adigwe is a Nigerian pharmacist and a pharmaceutical policy specialist. He has served as the director-general of the National Institute for Pharmaceutical Research and Development (NIPRD) since 10 August 2018. He was appointed by the President of Nigeria, Muhammadu Buhari. Before his appointment at NIPRD, he was the Executive Secretary of the Pharmaceutical Manufacturers Group of the Manufacturers' Association of Nigeria. He holds a doctorate in pharmaceutical policy from the University of Leeds, United Kingdom. In June 2026, President Bola Tinubu appointed Adigwe as the pioneer National Coordinator of the National Health Technology and Data Analytics Office (NHTDAO), a federal office established to coordinate Nigeria's digital health agenda.

== Education ==
Obi Adigwe attended the University of Jos, obtaining a Bachelor's of Pharmacy degree in 2000. He received an MSc in Global Health and Public Policy from the University of Edinburgh in 2008, and a Doctorate degree (PhD) in Pharmaceutical Policy from the University of Leeds, in 2012.

His doctoral dissertation was titled Non-Medical Prescribing in Chronic Non-Malignant Pain.

== Career ==
Adigwe began his career in 2005 as a pharmacist at the National Assembly's Pharmacy Department in Abuja, Nigeria, where he remained until 2007. From 2010 to 2012, he was a senior project officer in the Pharmacy Department Unit at the University of Leeds.

From 2012 to 2015, he headed the Health Policy Research and Development Unit at the National Assembly (NASS), FCT, Abuja, Nigeria, where he developed research and development strategies across multiple policy areas and also authored write-ups to disseminate findings from research projects. During this period, Dr. Adigwe served as Head of the Health Policy Research and Development (HPRD) Unit at Nigeria's National Assembly. He has published in the fields of health policy and pharmacy.

On 14 June 2022, Adigwe was reappointed as the director general of the National Institute for Pharmaceutical Research and Development (NIPRD). Adigwe has mentored more than 80 PhD and MSc candidates, and 100 pharmacists. Adigwe has more than 80 scientific presentations. He chaired and contributed to the COVID-19 pandemic response, by providing an analysis that was recognized by the Nigerian Government and informed the country on the Madagascan COVID-Organics preparation.

Throughout his career, Adigwe has led teams that managed to secure high-profile grants, including a Clinical Trials Grant from the ECOWAS, an API Grant from African Export–Import Bank, a Drug Development Mega Grant from Tertiary Education Trust Fund and a European Union / Government of Bulgaria Grant supporting Local Production of Vaccines in the Nigerian setting. Based on the NIPRD study led by Dr Adigwe, the European Union announced the award of an €18m grant to Nigeria, as a catalyst for the vaccine research.

Adigwe, in his capacity as Director General of NIPRD, stated that an analysis conducted by the institute found no evidence that Madagascar's herbal remedy could cure COVID-19. He also contributed to research that dealt with the coronavirus in Nigeria.

In May 2025, Adigwe was appointed by Iziaq Adekunle Salako to lead the Nigerian Ministerial Committee on the development and commercialization of the phytomedicines value chain.

He has worked with several African institutions on research and development initiatives. For example, he led the National Institute for Pharmaceutical Research and Development in engaging with the Department of Science and Innovation and the National Research Foundation Centre of Excellence in Indigenous Knowledge Systems (CIKS) based at the University of KwaZulu-Natal (UKZN). This culminated in a partnership to promote research and development, including human capital development in the Phytomedicine Value Chain.

Moreover, he engaged the Eswatini Epilepsy Organization during a symposium at the Eswatini Medical Christian University, turning indigenous plants into life-saving medicines; the University of Botswana for Bioinformatics and Genomics Sequencing research; and the Centre for Plant Medicine Research, Manpong-Akuapem, Ghana for collaboration in critical aspects of phytomedicines and drug development. He has co-authored a book informed by these topics with Kofi Busia entitled "A Contextual Exploration of Phytomedicines' Development in Africa".

Dr. Obi Peter Adigwe has headed and served on numerous Committees and Expert Working Groups at both national and international levels, including within the D8, United Nations, World Health Organization [WHO], The African Union and ECOWAS. In 2025, he was appointed Chair of the Ministerial Committee for the Commercialization of Phytomedicine value chain in Nigeria and advocacy lead for SPARK Global on translational research in Africa. Dr. Adigwe was presented with Nigeria's highest Productivity Award by the President of Nigeria in recognition of his hard work, productivity and excellence in National Developmental Initiatives. Adigwe is a fellow of the Nigerian Academy of Pharmacy, the West African Institute of Public Health, the West African Postgraduate College of Pharmacists, and the Pharmaceutical Society of Nigeria (PSN).

On 26 June 2026, President Bola Tinubu approved the establishment of the National Health Technology and Data Analytics Office (NHTDAO) and appointed Adigwe as its pioneer National Coordinator. The office, domiciled in the Office of the Coordinating Minister of Health and Social Welfare, was established to coordinate Nigeria's digital health agenda, promote interoperability across the health sector, and oversee implementation of the National Digital Health Architecture.
