= National Agricultural Extension, Research and Liaison Services =

Federal Government Agency

The National Agricultural Extension and Research Liaison Services (NAERLS)
- Abbreviation: NAERLS

Agency overview
- Formed: 1963

Jurisdictional structure
- Federal agency (Operations jurisdiction): Nigeria
- Operations jurisdiction: Nigeria
- Legal jurisdiction: The National Agricultural Extension and Research Liaison Services
- Governing body: President of Nigeria
- Constituting instrument: Statute 19, separated ERLS from IAR in 1975
- General nature: Federal law enforcement

Operational structure
- Headquarters: P. M. B. 1067, Zaria, Kaduna State - Nigeria.,Ahmadu Bello University, Zaria.
- Agency executive: Professor Yusuf Ahmad Sani, Managing Director/Chief Executive

Website
- https://naerls.gov.ng/history/

National Agricultural Extension, Research and Liaison Services is an agency owned by the Federal Republic of Nigeria under the Ministry of Agriculture. It is one of the 18 National Agricultural Research Institutes (NARIs) in Nigeria and Professor Emmanual Ikani was the Executive Director(NAERLS).

== History ==
The National Agricultural Extension and Research Liaison Services (NAERLS) evolved from the Specialist Services Section of the former Northern Nigeria Ministry of Agriculture in 1963. Initially, it was known as the Research Liaison Section (RLS) and was later transferred to the Institute for Agricultural Research (IAR) in 1968. In 1975, the Ahmadu Bello University (ABU) Council separated ERLS from IAR and renamed it the Agricultural Extension and Research Liaison Services (AERLS). AERLS became an independent institute within the Agricultural Complex of the University. In 1987, AERLS earned a national mandate and was transformed into NAERLS. NAERLS established 5 zonal offices in each of the 5 agro-ecological zones of Nigeria. Additionally, NAERLS established 6 Zonal Offices located in each of the 6 coordinating Research Institutes across the country. In 2024 the Agricultural Extension Revitalization Bill was presented to the National Assembly to boost the productivity and make the extension agent more organised.

== Functions ==
NAERLS comprises six programmes with oversight and implementation functions that cater to different aspects of agricultural development. The Agricultural Communication Research Programme explores effective communication strategies, while the Agricultural Economics and Resource Management Programme focuses on economic analysis and optimal resource allocation. The Agricultural Performance and Evaluation Programme assesses project impact, identifying areas for improvement. Agricultural Extension Research Programme develops innovative extension approaches to boost productivity. The Extension Training and Outreach Programme builds capacity through training and outreach activities, while the Library, Documentation, and Information Resource Programme provides access to agricultural information and documentation.
