= Nigerian Nuclear Regulatory Authority =

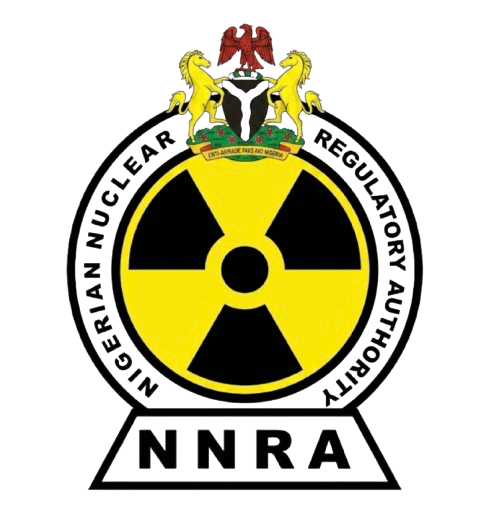

Agency overview
- Formed: 3 August 1995; 31 years ago
- Jurisdiction: Nigeria
- Headquarters: Abuja
- Agency executive: Yau Usman Idris, Director General
- Key document: Nuclear Safety and Radiation Protection Act No. 19.
- Website: https://nnra.gov.ng/

The Nigerian Nuclear Regulatory Authority (NNRA) is the government entity responsible for nuclear safety and radiological protection regulation in Nigeria. It was established pursuant to the Nuclear Act 1995 on 3 August 1995 and began effective operation in 2001. The current director general of the NNRA is Dr Yau Usman Idris.

== Mandate and Functions ==
The NNRA functions as an independent regulatory body. Its primary responsibilities include:

- Licensing and Registration: Issuing authorizations, permits, and licenses for the possession, use, import, export, transportation, and storage of radioactive sources and nuclear materials.
- Inspection and Enforcement: Conducting regular oversight and compliance audits of facilities utilizing ionizing radiation to ensure adherence to national regulations.
- Radiological Protection: Monitoring radiation employers, service providers, and the general public to minimize unnecessary exposure to radiation.
- International Obligations: Acting as the national focal point to enable Nigeria to meet its commitments to international bodies, particularly the International Atomic Energy Agency (IAEA).

== Key Regulated Sectors ==
The NNRA regulates practices across several major industries in Nigeria:

=== Health and Medicine ===
The authority regulates medical facilities utilizing radiation for diagnostics and treatment. This includes standardizing X-ray centers, CT scan clinics, and advanced radiotherapy centers. The NNRA collaborates heavily with state ministries of health to advance cancer care infrastructure safely.

=== Petroleum and Industry ===
In Nigeria’s oil and gas sector, radioactive sources are frequently used for industrial radiography, well logging, and nucleonic gauges. The NNRA enforces strict security protocols on oil firms to prevent the loss or theft of radioactive materials.

=== Research and Waste Management ===
Nigeria operates a research reactor called Nigeria Research Reactor-1 (NIRR-1) at the Centre for Energy Research and Training (CERT) in Zaria, Kaduna State. The NNRA performs emergency preparedness and response (EPR) exercises at this facility and regulates Nigeria’s centralized Radioactive Waste Management Facility (RWMF) located there.

== Controversies ==
The most significant historical event involving Nigeria Research Reactor-1 (NIRR-1) wasn’t an accident, but a highly sensitive international operation to eliminate nuclear proliferation risks. When China built and commissioned NIRR-1 for Nigeria in 2004, it was fueled by Highly Enriched Uranium (HEU)—specifically, uranium enriched to 90.2% U^{235}. This is the exact same grade of material used to build nuclear weapons. Because of the risk of terrorist groups or non-state actors targeting the facility to steal the fuel, the IAEA, Nigeria, China, and the United States launched a quiet, multi-year project to redesign the reactor core.

- The Swap: In late 2018, the weapons-grade HEU core was carefully extracted, packaged, and flown back to China.
- The New Fuel: It was replaced with a Low Enriched Uranium (LEU) core (enriched to only about 13%), which is completely useless for weapons but works perfectly for scientific research.
- The Milestone: This successful operation marked the complete elimination of weapons-grade civilian uranium on the African continent.
