= Federal Ministry of Innovation, Science and Technology =

Nigerian government ministry

- Coat of arms of Nigeria

Agency overview
- Jurisdiction: Government of Nigeria
- Headquarters: Federal Secretariat Abuja
- Minister responsible: Uche Nnaji
- Website: www.scienceandtech.gov.ng

The Federal Ministry of Innovation, Science and Technology is a Nigerian ministry whose mission is to facilitate the development and deployment of science and technology apparatus to enhance the pace of socio-economic development of the country through appropriate technological inputs into productive activities in the nation. It is headed by a Minister appointed by the President, assisted by a Permanent Secretary, who is a career civil servant. President Bola Tinubu, GCFR on 16 August 2023 appointed Uche Nnaji as the Minister of Science and Technology. Mr James Sule, mni is the current permanent secretary in the ministry.

The Ministry was renamed to Federal Ministry of Innovation, Science and Technology on 6 August 2021.

== Activities ==
The ministry engages in the following activities:

1. Formulation, monitoring and review of the National Policy on Science, Technology and Innovation to attain the macro-economic and social objectives of Vision 20:2020 as it relates to science and technology;
2. Acquisition and application of Science, Technology and Innovation contribution to increase agricultural and livestock productivity;
3. Increasing energy reliance through sustainable Research and Development (R&D) in nuclear, renewable and alternative energy sources for peaceful and development purposes;
4. Promotion of wealth creation through support to key industrial and manufacturing sectors;
5. Creation of Technology infrastructure and knowledge base to facilitate its wide application for development;
6. Application of natural medicine resources and technologies for health sector development;
7. Acquisition and application of Space Science and Technology as a key driver of economic development; and
8. Ensuring the impact of R&D results in the Nigerian economy through the promotion of indigenous research capacity to facilitate technology transfer.

The Computers for All Nigerians Initiative (CANI) program is focused on enhancing Nigeria's economic and social foundation by supplying access to personal computers (PCs) and internet to its citizens. It is a joint effort between the Federal Ministry of Science and Technology (FMST) and the National Information Technology Development Agency (NITDA) with local banks and PC producers, as well as private technology companies like Intel and Microsoft.

== Departments ==
- Human Resources Management
- Finance and Accounts
- Planning Research and Policy Analysis
- Health and Bio-Medical Sciences
- Technology Acquisition and Adaptation
- Renewable and Conventional Energy Technology
- Information and Communication Technology
- General Services
- Special Duties
- Reform Coordination and Service Improvement
- Procurement
- Chemical Technology
- Bio-resources Technology
- Science and Technology Promotion
- Environmental and Science Technology.

== Units ==
Legal, Press, Internal Audit and Private Public partnership (PPP).

== Parastatals ==
The ministry is responsible for a number of parastatals, or government-owned agencies which include:

- National Board For Technology Incubation (NBTI)
- Energy Commission of Nigeria (ECN)
- The Nigerian Institute of Science Laboratory Technology (NISLT) - www.nislt.gov.ng
- Nigerian Institute For Trypanosomiasis And Onchocerciasis (NITR)
- National Biotechnology Development Agency (NABDA)
- National Centre For Technology Management (NACETEM)
- National Office For Technology Acquisition And Promotion (NOTAP)
- Nigerian Natural Medicine Development Agency (NNMDA)
- National Space Research and Development Agency (NARSDA)
- Raw Materials Research and Development Council (RMRDC), Abuja
- Nigerian Building and Road Research Institute (NBBRI)
- National Institute of Leather Science and Technology (NILEST), Samaru Zaria
- National Research Institute for Chemical Technology (NARICT), Zaria
- Sheda Science and Technology Complex (SHESTCO), Abuja
- Project Development Institute (PRODA), Enugu
- Federal Institute of Food & Industrial Research, Oshodi (FIIRO)
- National Agency for Science and Engineering Infrastructure (NASENI), Abuja

== See also ==
- Nigerian Civil Service
- Federal Ministries of Nigeria
