= Nigerian Agricultural Insurance Corporation =

Federal Government Agency

- Abbreviation: NAIC

Agency overview
- Formed: 1987

Jurisdictional structure
- Federal agency (Operations jurisdiction): Nigeria
- Operations jurisdiction: Nigeria
- Legal jurisdiction: Nigerian Agricultural Insurance Corporation
- Governing body: President of Nigeria
- Constituting instrument: Act 37 of 1993.
- General nature: Federal law enforcement

Operational structure
- Headquarters: Plot 590 Zone A O Central Area, Abuja, Nigeria
- Agency executive: Folashade Joseph, Director-General

Website
- https://naic.gov.ng/

Nigeria Agricultural Insurance Corporation is an agency of the Federal Republic of Nigeria under the Federal Ministry of Agriculture, and the sole insurance company set up specifically to provide agricultural risk insurance cover to Nigerian farmers. It operates under the leadership of Folashade Joseph, who serves as the current Director-General.

== History ==
NAIC is an agency of the Federal Republic of Nigeria under the Ministry of Agriculture. It was established on 15 November 1987, incorporated in June 1988, and later turned into a corporation in 1993 by the enabling Act 37 of 1993.

== Functions ==
NAIC is the sole insurance company owned by the Federal government of Nigeria, it was set up specifically to provide agricultural risk insurance cover to Nigerian farmers.
