= Nigeria Agricultural Quarantine Service =

Federal agricultural quarantine agency of Nigeria

Government agency overview
- Type: Paramilitary
- Jurisdiction: Federal Government of Nigeria
- Headquarters: Abuja, Nigeria
- Government agency executive: Vincent Isegbe, Comptroller-General
- Parent department: Federal Ministry of Agriculture and Food Security
- Website: naqs.gov.ng

The Nigeria Agricultural Quarantine Service (NAQS) is a federal government agency of Nigeria responsible for the prevention, introduction, establishment, and spread of foreign pests and diseases affecting plants, animals, and aquatic resources into and out of Nigeria. Its functions include inspection, certification, surveillance and enforcement of sanitary and phytosanitary measures relating to agricultural trade.

NAQS was established as a statutory body under the Nigeria Agricultural Quarantine Service (Establishment) Act, 2018. The Act provides for the Service's functions, governing board, departments and powers relating to the prevention and control of pests and diseases affecting plants, animals and aquatic resources.

The Service is also Nigeria's National Plant Protection Organization under the International Plant Protection Convention (IPPC).

== History ==
Agricultural quarantine functions in Nigeria predate the establishment of NAQS as a statutory agency. Before the creation of the Service, responsibilities for plant, animal and aquatic-resource quarantine were administered through separate departments under the Federal Ministry of Agriculture.

The Nigeria Agricultural Quarantine Service was subsequently established under federal legislation to bring these quarantine functions within a unified institutional framework. The Nigeria Agricultural Quarantine Service (Establishment) Act was enacted in 2018 and provides for the Service as a corporate body with responsibility for agricultural quarantine in Nigeria.

The legislation establishes a governing board and provides for departments responsible for plant quarantine, animal quarantine, aquatic resources, laboratory management, planning and research, and finance and administration.

Vincent Isegbe became the first director-general of NAQS following its establishment as a statutory agency. He was appointed to another five-year term by President Bola Tinubu in 2024.

== Legal framework ==
The principal legislation governing NAQS is the Nigeria Agricultural Quarantine Service (Establishment) Act, 2018. The Act establishes the Service for the prevention of the entry, establishment and spread of foreign pests and diseases affecting plants, animals and aquatic resources and their products.

The legislation also provides for the promotion and enforcement of sanitary and phytosanitary measures relating to the import and export of agricultural products. Its provisions cover the regulation of the movement of plants, animals and aquatic resources and the inspection and certification of agricultural commodities.

The Act provides NAQS with powers to inspect regulated agricultural materials and means of transportation, establish quarantine stations, conduct surveillance, issue certificates and permits, and take measures against materials or commodities considered to pose quarantine risks.

The Act is listed in the Food and Agriculture Organization's FAOLEX database among Nigeria's legislation relating to cultivated plants and livestock.

== Functions ==
NAQS is responsible for preventing the introduction, establishment and spread of pests and diseases that may affect Nigeria's agricultural resources. Its regulatory responsibilities extend to plants, animals, aquatic resources and associated agricultural products.

The Service's statutory and regulatory functions include:

- inspecting plants, plant products, animals, animal products, aquatic resources and other regulated agricultural commodities;
- regulating the importation and exportation of agricultural commodities;
- issuing permits and certificates required for the movement of regulated agricultural materials;
- conducting pest and disease surveillance;
- preventing, controlling and, where necessary, assisting with the eradication of regulated pests and diseases;
- enforcing agricultural quarantine laws and regulations;
- inspecting means of transportation and cargo carrying regulated agricultural commodities;
- establishing and operating quarantine stations and other facilities;
- undertaking laboratory and diagnostic activities;
- monitoring compliance with sanitary and phytosanitary requirements; and
- implementing relevant international agreements and standards concerning agricultural quarantine.

The Service also performs inspection and certification functions in relation to agricultural products intended for export. These functions are intended to support compliance with the phytosanitary and other quarantine requirements of importing countries.

== Organisation ==
NAQS is headed by a Comptroller-General and operates through departments and other administrative units established under its statutory framework.

The Service's principal technical areas are plant quarantine, animal quarantine and aquatic resources quarantine. These functions are supported by laboratory, planning, research, finance, human resources and procurement functions.

=== Plant quarantine ===
The Plant Quarantine Department is responsible for the regulation of plants, plant products and other materials that may carry plant pests and diseases. Its activities include inspection, certification, surveillance and the regulation of imports and exports of regulated plant materials.

The department operates within the international phytosanitary framework established by the International Plant Protection Convention. The IPPC identifies Nigeria's National Plant Protection Organization as the Nigeria Agricultural Quarantine Service.

=== Animal quarantine ===
The Animal Quarantine Department is responsible for quarantine measures relating to animals and animal products. Its activities include the inspection of animals and animal products entering or leaving Nigeria and the enforcement of veterinary health requirements.

Animal quarantine activities also include surveillance for animal diseases and the application of quarantine measures where regulated animals or products present a disease risk.

=== Aquatic resources quarantine ===
The Aquatic Resources Quarantine Department is responsible for quarantine measures relating to aquatic organisms and aquatic products. The 2018 Act specifically includes aquatic resources within the scope of NAQS's regulatory responsibilities.

The department's functions include inspection and regulation of aquatic resources involved in international trade and measures intended to prevent the introduction or spread of aquatic pests and diseases.

== International cooperation ==
NAQS participates in the international regulatory framework governing agricultural quarantine and the movement of agricultural commodities.

Under the International Plant Protection Convention, NAQS serves as Nigeria's National Plant Protection Organization. The IPPC provides an international framework for cooperation in preventing the introduction and spread of plant pests and for facilitating the safe movement of plants and plant products.

NAQS's statutory responsibilities also include the implementation of relevant international agreements, protocols and conventions concerning agricultural quarantine and the movement of plants, animals and aquatic resources.

The Service's work is related to the broader sanitary and phytosanitary measures framework governing international agricultural trade, including standards and procedures recognised through international organisations and agreements.

== Operations ==
NAQS conducts quarantine operations at locations through which regulated agricultural commodities enter or leave Nigeria. These include airports, seaports and land borders, as well as other designated inspection and quarantine locations.

Quarantine operations may involve documentary checks, physical inspection, sampling, laboratory examination, treatment, certification, detention or other measures prescribed by law and applicable quarantine requirements.

For plant products, inspection and certification are undertaken to determine whether consignments meet applicable phytosanitary requirements. Export consignments may require phytosanitary certification before shipment to an importing country.

The Service's quarantine responsibilities also cover regulated materials and means of transportation associated with agricultural trade. The statutory framework gives NAQS powers relating to inspection and quarantine control at points of entry and exit.

== Leadership ==
The Service is headed by a Comptroller-General. Vincent Isegbe has served as the head of NAQS since its establishment as a statutory agency and was reappointed in 2024.

== See also ==
- Federal Ministry of Agriculture and Food Security
- Nigeria Customs Service
- Plant quarantine
- Animal quarantine
- Aquaculture
- Phytosanitary certificate
- Sanitary and phytosanitary measures
- International Plant Protection Convention
- World Organisation for Animal Health
- Food and Agriculture Organization
