= Raw Materials Research and Development Council =

Agency for raw materials Nigeria

Raw Materials Research and Development Council (RMRDC)

Agency overview
- Formed: 1987
- Jurisdiction: Federal Government of Nigeria
- Headquarters: Garki, Abuja
- Employees: 2300
- Minister responsible: Chief Uche Nnaji, Federal Ministry of Innovation, Science and Technology
- Agency executive: Prof. Martin Ike-muonso, Director-General and Chief executive officer
- Website: https://rmrdc.gov.ng

The Raw Materials Research and Development Council (RMRDC) is a federal government of Nigeria agency for research institutions that is responsible for industrial raw materials growth, promotion and utilization supervised by Federal Ministry of Innovation, Science and Technology. It has it head office at Maitama district Garki, Abuja. The current director-general is Prof. Martin Ike-muonso.

== Establishments ==
It was established by the recommendations of workshops on industrials matters in 1987 by the Decree 39 (RMRDC) Act CAP R.3 laws of federation of Nigeria, 2004 but was first organized by the former Ministry of Industry, Nigeria Institute of Social and Economic Research and Manufacturers Association of Nigeria which was set up in 1983.

At the time of it establishment, the foreign dwindling exchange earning was expanded in petroleum, import of products and raw materials were fully available in Nigeria began it first operations in Lagos.

== Role and aims ==
The research councils aims is to develop and utilize the industrial growth based on raw materials and to provides or enable informations in appropriate policies guiding exploitation and investment in Nigeria.

== Publications ==
- Exhibition of raw materials process equipment and technology exhibition of products of raw materials R & D results Techno-Expo 2013 and RMRDC silver jubilee. Raw Materials Research and Development Council, Federal Ministry of Science & Technology. 101 pages, OCLC 874044752, 12–15 February 2013
- Industrial raw materials development in Nigeria: Professor Onwualu's score card (2005-2013), A P Onwualu; M L Buga. ISBN 9789785216998, 9785216993, OCLC 890946218. viii, 295 pages
- Priority investment profiles of cottage industries in Edo State. Family Economic Advancement Programme (Nigeria), Prepared for Family Economic Advancement Programme (FEAP). Raw Materials Research and Development Council Nigeria, 1998, OCLC 43615933, 82 pages
- Avocado utilization: its industrial and economic potentials:Raw Materials Research and Development Council Nigeria. Federal Ministry of Science and Technology; Raw Materials Research and Development Council (RMRDC), Federal Ministry of Science and Technology. National government publication, OCLC 936186513 ISBN 978807054X, 9789788070542, OCLC 770383098, February 2010. H D Ibrahim and A A Ogunwusi.
