= Cocoa Research Institute of Nigeria =

Research institute in Oyo state, Nigeria

Cocoa research institute of Nigeria
- Established: 1 December 1964
- Location: Ibadan, Oyo State, Nigeria; 7.4056° N, 3.9119° E

The Cocoa Research Institute of Nigeria (CRIN) in Oyo State, Nigeria, is a cocoa research institute established by the Federal Government of Nigeria through the Nigeria Research Institute Act of 1964. The act established research institutes for cocoa, palm oil, coffee and cola.

The Cocoa Research Institute of Nigeria (CRIN) was established in Ibadan, Oyo State on 1 December 1964 as a successor autonomous research organisation to the Nigerian Substation of the defunct West African Cocoa Research Institute (WACRI).

CRIN was established to promote and improve the productivity of cocoa and its product in Nigeria and globally. CRIN was originally part of the West Africa Cocoa Research Institute (WACRI) based in Tafo, Ghana.

Cocoa and its products serves as a source of income and employment for farmers in the cocoa producing states of Nigeria. The primary function of CRIN is to conduct high quality research in cocoa, kola, and coffee as well as to provide facilities for teaching and research with these agricultural products. The Executive Director of the Institute is Dr Patrick Adebola.

Banditry attack

On March 18, 2026, four cocoa farmers were reported to have been abducted by unknown gunmen who are believed to belong to a group of Fulani bandits ravaging the South Western part of Nigeria. Out of the four kidnapped, police were swift in rescuing one while ongoing manhunt has begun to rescue the remaining three farmers.

Topography

CRIN is strategically positioned in the periphery of emerging Ibadan city and at the heart of Oluyole Local Government where the ongoing Ibadan Circular road project that cut across over 180 communities across Oyo State.

== The New Cocoa Hybrids ==
The eight new Cocoa hybrids was introduced by the Portuguese into the Gulf of Guinea from where it got to.

== Research ==
CRIN released new varieties of cocoa in 2013.

Cocoa research institution of Nigeria (University of ibadan)

Coca development unit (state government office, Ibadan)

== Training ==
The institute has also trained farmers on current best practices including how to improve on the flavour of cocoa produce across the country as an aspect of value addition that will increase sales. CRIN also provides skill acquisition sessions and extension workshops for stakeholders in the cocoa planting and processing industry for purposes of knowledge transfer on planting, grafting, fermentation, drying and packaging.
