= Cabinet of President Umaru Yar'Adua =

- Cabinet of Nigeria
- Date established: July 2007
- Date dissolved: 9 February 2010

Leadership and composition
- Head of state: Umaru Musa Yar'Adua
- Head of government: Umaru Musa Yar'Adua

Formation and history
- Predecessor: Cabinet of President Olusegun Obasanjo
- Successor: Cabinet of President Goodluck Jonathan

The Cabinet of President Umaru Yar'Adua was made up of the Ministers and Ministers of State appointed by Nigerian President Umaru Yar'Adua. The cabinet continued to govern for a few weeks under Acting President Goodluck Jonathan after Yar'Adua fell terminally ill.

== History ==
The cabinet replaced that of Yar'Adua's predecessor President Olusegun Obasanjo, and was named in July 2007, two months after Yar'Adua had assumed office. Yar'Adua created a new cabinet position, the Minister of the Niger Delta, as part of his creation of the Niger Delta Ministry. In October 2008, Yar'Adua announced a major cabinet reshuffle, with 20 of the 41 ministers or ministers of state being dropped from the cabinet. Several of the remaining ministers assumed temporary responsibility for other ministries pending confirmation hearings for the Yar'Adua's new nominees. There was a considerable delay before Yar'Adua swore in sixteen new ministers on 17 December 2008. In July 2009, Yar'Adua announced a minor cabinet shuffle. The Minister of the Interior, retired general Godwin Abbe, was moved to the Defense Ministry, replacing Shettima Mustapha who took his place as Minister of Interior. The Ministers of State of these two ministries also traded places. The move was apparently an effort to speed up resolution of the Niger Delta Conflict.

The cabinet became part of a power struggle within the Nigerian government after Yar'Adua became extremely ill and left Nigeria to seek treatment in Saudi Arabia, without transferring power to Goodluck Johnathan, his vice-president.

Johnathan dissolved the cabinet on 17 March 2010 in what The New York Times called "the strongest assertion yet of his authority over a country where his rule has been challenged". Motives given for the dissolution of the cabinet were Jonathan's desire to take the government in a new direction as well as fighting within the cabinet over how much power Jonathan should exercise as acting president.

== Cabinet membership ==
Title	Officeholders
Vice-President	Goodluck Jonathan May 2009
Secretary	Baba Gana Kingibe (July 2007 – Sept 2008); Mahmud Yayale Ahmed Sept 2008
Agriculture & Water Resources	Abba Sayyadi Ruma (July 2007 – March 2010)
Aviation	Babatunde Omotoba (Dec 2008 – March 2010)
Commerce and Industry	Charles Ugwuh (July 2007 – Oct 2008); Achike Udenwa (December 2008 – March 2010)
Defence	Mahmud Yayale Ahmed (July 2007 – Sept 2008); Shettima Mustapha (Dec 2008 – July 2009); Godwin Abbe (July 2009 – March 2010)
Education	Igwe Aja-Nwachukwu (July 2007 – Dec 2008); Sam Egwu (Dec 2008 – March 2010)
Environment	Halima Tayo Alao (July 2007 – Oct 2008); John Odey (Dec 2008 – March 2010) (Reinstated April 2010)
Federal Capital Territory	Aliyu Modibbo Umar (July 2007 – Oct 2008); Adamu Aliero (Dec 2008 – March 2010)
Finance	Shamsuddeen Usman (July 2007 – Jan 2009); Mansur Muhtar (Jan 2009 – March 2010)
Foreign Affairs	Ojo Maduekwe (July 2007 – March 2010)
Health	Adenike Grange (July 2007 – March 2008); Babatunde Osotimehin (December 2008 – March 2010)
Information and Communication	John Odey (July 2007 – Dec 2008); Dora Akunyili (December 2008 – March 2010) (Reinstated April 2010)
Interior	Godwin Abbe (July 2007 – July 2009); Shettima Mustapha (July 2009 – March 2010)
Justice (Attorney General)	Michael Aondoakaa (July 2007 – February 2010) (Temporarily replaced by Adetokunbo Kayode)
Labour	Hassan Muhammed Lawal (July 2007 – Dec 2008); Adetokunbo Kayode (December 2008 – February 2010)
Mines and Steel Development	Sarafa Tunji Ishola (July 2007 – Oct 2008); Diezani Alison-Madueke (December 2008 – March 2010)
National Planning Commission	Mohammed Sanusi Daggash (July 2007 – Oct 2008); Shamsuddeen Usman (January 2009 – March 2010) (Reinstated April 2010)
Niger Delta	Ufot Ekaette (December 2008 – March 2010)
Petroleum	Rilwanu Lukman (December 2008 – February 2010)
Police Affairs	Ibrahim Lame (December 2008 – March 2010)
Power	Rilwan Lanre Babalola (December 2008 – March 2010)
Science & Technology	Grace Ekpiwhre (July 2007 – Dec 2008); Alhassan Bako Zaku (December 2008 – February 2010)
Sports	Abdulrahman Gimba (July 2007 – Oct 2008); Sani Ndanusa (December 2008 – March 2010)
Transport	Diezani Alison-Madueke (July 2007 – Dec 2008); Ibrahim Bio (December 2008 – March 2010)
Tourism, Culture and National Orientation	Adetokunbo Kayode (July 2007 – Dec 2008); Bello Jibrin Gada (December 2008 – March 2010)
Women Affairs	Saudatu Bungudu (July 2007 – Oct 2008); Salamatu Hussaini Suleiman (December 2008 – March 2010)
Works and Housing	Hassan Muhammed Lawal (December 2008 – March 2010)
Youth Development	Akinlabi Olasunkanmi (July 2007 – March 2010) (Reinstated April 2010)

== See also ==
- Cabinet of Nigeria
