= Cabinet of Goodluck Jonathan =

Goodluck Jonathan Leadership in Nigeria

Cabinet of President Goodluck Jonathan
- Cabinet of Nigeria
- Date formed: 9 February 2010
- Date dissolved: 29 May 2015

People and organisations
- Head of state: Goodluck Jonathan
- Head of government: Goodluck Jonathan

History
- Predecessor: Cabinet of President Umaru Yar'Adua
- Successor: First Cabinet of President Muhammadu Buhari

The Cabinet of President Goodluck Jonathan was appointed by Acting President Goodluck Jonathan of Nigeria a few weeks after he took office during the terminal illness of President Umaru Yar'Adua.

== First cabinet – 2010 ==
On 13 January 2010, a federal court empowered Jonathan to manage state affairs while Yar'Adua received medical treatment in Saudi Arabia, and on 9 February 2010 the Nigerian Senate confirmed him as Acting President. On 10 February 2010, Jonathan demoted Minister of Justice Michael Aondoakaa to Special Duties, replacing him by Prince Adetokunbo Kayode. Jonathan retained the remainder Yar'Adua's cabinet until 16 March 2010, when he dissolved it in an assertion of his authority over a divided administration where some members questioned his right to act as president. On 6 April 2010, Jonathan swore in his new cabinet. Yar'Adua died on 5 May 2010, and Jonathan was sworn in as president the next day.

Minister in the first cabinet were:

Ministry	Minister
Agriculture	Prof. Sheikh Ahmed Abdullah
Aviation	Mrs. Fidelia Njeze
Commerce & Industry	Sen. Jubril Martins-Kuye
Culture & Tourism	Abubakar Sadiq A. Mohammed
Defence	Chief Adetokunbo Kayode, SAN
Defence (state)	Alhaji Murtala Shehu Yar'adua
Education	Prof. (Mrs) Ruqayyah Ahmed Rufa'i
Environment	John Ogar Odey
FCT	Senator Bala Mohammed
Finance	Olusegun Olutoyin Aganga
Foreign Affairs	Henry Odein Ajumogobia
Health	(vacant)
Information & Communications	Prof. Dora Akunyili
Interior	Capt. Emmanuel Iheanacho
Justice	Mohammed Bello Adoke, SAN
Labour & Productivity	Chukwuemeka Ngozichineke Wogu
Lands & Urban Development	Hon. Nduese Essien
Mines & Steel Development	Arc. Musa Mohammed Sada
National Planning Commission	Dr. Shamsuddeen Usman
National Sports Commission	Hon. Ibrahim Isa Bio
Niger Delta Affairs	Dr Stephen Oru
Petroleum Resources	Mrs. Diezani Alison-Madueke
Police Affairs	Alhaji Adamu Waziri
Power	Acting President Goodluck Jonathan
Science & Technology	Prof. Muhammed K. Abubakar
Special Duties	Navy Capt. Omoniyi Caleb Olubolade (Rtd)
Transport	Yusuf Sulaiman
Women Affairs	Mrs. Josephine Anenih
Works	Sen. Mohammed Sanusi Daggash
Youth Development	Sen. Akinlabi Olasunkanmi

== July 2011 cabinet ==
In July 2011, after the start of his second term, Jonathan appointed a new cabinet. Members included:

Ministry	Minister	State			
Agric and Natural Resources (State)	Bukar Tijani	Borno			
Attorney General, Justice	Mohammed Bello Adoke	Kogi			
Aviation	Stella Oduah-Ogiemwonyi	Anambra			
Defence	Haliru Mohammed Bello	Kebbi			
Defence (State)	Erelu Olusola Obada	Osun			
Education	Ruqayyah Ahmed Rufa'i	Jigawa			
FCT (State)	Olajumoke Akinjide	Oyo			
Federal Capital Territory	Bala Mohammed	Bauchi			
Finance	Ngozi Okonjo-Iweala	Abia			
Finance (State)	Yerima Lawal Ngama	Yobe			
Foreign Affairs	Olugbenga Ashiru	Ogun			
Foreign Affairs (State)	Viola Onwuliri	Imo	Foreign Affairs (State)2	Dr Nuruddeen Muhammad	Jigawa
Health	Onyebuchi Chukwu	Ebonyi			
Information	Labaran Maku	Nasarawa			
Communication Technology	Mrs. Omobola Johnson	Ondo			
Interior	Comrade Abba Moro	Benue			
Labour	Emeka Wogu	Abia			
Mines and Steel Development	Mohammed Musa Sada	Katsina			
National Planning	Shamsudeen Usman	Kano			
Niger Delta Affairs	Godsday Orubebe	Delta			
Niger Delta Affairs (State)	Zainab Ibrahim Kuchi	Niger			
Petroleum	Diezani Alison-Madueke	Bayelsa			
Police Affairs	Caleb Olubolade	Ekiti			
Power	Osita Nebo took over from Bart Nnaji	Enugu			
Science and Technology	Ita Okon Bassey Ewa	Akwa Ibom			
Sports	Yusuf Sulaiman	Sokoto			
Trade and Investment	Olusegun O. Aganga	Lagos			
Trade and Investment (State)	Samuel Ioraer Ortom	Benue			
Transport	Idris A.Umar	Gombe			
Women Affairs	Zainab Maina	Adamawa			
Works	Mike Onolememen	Edo			
Works (State)	Bashir Yugudu	Zamfara			
Youth Development	Bolaji Abdullahi	Kwara			
Agriculture & Rural Development	Akinwumi Adesina	Oyo			

== See also ==
- Cabinet of Nigeria
