= List of ministers of the Federal Capital Territory (Nigeria) =

Minister of Federal Capital Territory
- Coat of arms of the Nigerian Government

- State flag of Nigeria
- Incumbent; Nyesom Wike since 21 August 2023
- Federal Capital Territory Administration
- Member of: Federal Cabinet
- Appointer: The president
- Website: fcta.gov.ng/

This is a list of ministers of the Federal Capital Territory of Nigeria. The Federal Capital Territory was formed in 1976 from parts of former Nasarawa, Niger, and Kogi States.

The minister of the Federal Capital Territory of Nigeria is the head of the Federal Capital Territory Administration and a member of the Federal Executive Council.

Political party: NPN NPP APC PDP Military

Name (Born-Died)		Portrait	Term of Office		Cabinet
Military Government (1976–1979)
1	Mobolaji Ajose-Adeogun (1927–2023)		August 1975	1979	Muhammed (Federal Executive Council) Obasanjo (Federal Executive Council)
Second Republic
2	John Jatau Kadiya (1936–1997)		December 1979	February 1982	Shagari (I)
3	Abubakar Iro Danmusa (1935–2010)		February 1982	October 1983	Shagari (I)
4	Haliru Dantoro (1938–2015)		October 1983	December 1983	Shagari (II)
Military Government (1983–1993)
5	Mamman Jiya Vatsa (1940–1986)		December 1983	December 1985	Buhari (Federal Executive Council)
6	Hamza Abdullahi (1945–2019)		1986	1989	Babangida (Federal Executive Council)
7	Gado Nasko (b. 1941)		1989	1989–1993	Babangida (Federal Executive Council)
Third Republic (Interim National Government)
7	Gado Nasko (b. 1941)		January 1993	17 November 1993	Shonekan (I)
Military Government (1993–1999)
8	Jeremiah Useni (b. 1943)		1993	1998	Abacha (Federal Executive Council)
9	Mamman Kontagora (1944–2013)		August 1998	May 1999	Abubakar (Federal Executive Council)
Fourth Republic
10	Ibrahim Bunu (b. 1950)		30 June 1999	30 January 2001	Obasanjo (I)
11	Mohammed Abba Gana (b. 1943)		8 February 2001	17 July 2003	Obasanjo (I)
12	Nasir el-Rufai (b. 1960)		17 July 2003	27 July 2007	Obasanjo (II)
13	Aliyu Modibbo Umar (b. 1958)		26 July 2007	29 October 2008	Yar'Adua (I)
14	Adamu Aliero (b. 1957)		17 December 2008	17 March 2010	Jonathan (I)
15	Bala Mohammed (b. 1958)		8 April 2010	28 May 2015	Jonathan (II)
16	Mohammed Musa Bello (b. 1959)		11 November 2015	29 May 2023	Buhari (I • II)
17	Nyesom Wike (b. 1966)		21 August 2023	Incumbent	Tinubu (I)

== See also ==
- Federal Capital Territory Administration
- States of Nigeria
- List of state governors of Nigeria
