= Federal Ministry of Works (Nigeria) =

Federal ministry of the Federal Republic of Nigeria

Agency overview
- Formed: 1951; 75 years ago
- Jurisdiction: Federal Republic of Nigeria
- Headquarters: Mabushi, Abuja
- Annual budget: ₦1.03 trillion (2024)
- Minister responsible: Dave Umahi, Federal Minister of Works
- Agency executive: Yakubu Kofarmata, Permanent Secretary
- Website: fmw.gov.ng

The Federal Ministry of Works of Nigeria is a government body responsible for the planning, development, and maintenance of federal roads, bridges, and infrastructure across the country. It oversees the construction and rehabilitation of highways, ensures road safety standards are met, and coordinates with other relevant agencies and stakeholders in the transportation sector.

The current Minister of Works is David Umahi.

== Structure ==
The Ministry of Works is structured into eleven professional departments and eight units.

=== Departments ===
- Highways, Planning & Development
- Human Resource Management
- Highways Construction and Rehabilitation
- Finance and Accounts
- Planning, Research and Statistics
- Information and Communication Technology
- Procurement
- Reform Coord. & Service Improvement
- Highway Bridges and Design
- Highways, Mat. Geo-Technics & QC
- Engineering Services

=== Units ===
- Legal Services
- Press and Public Relations
- Office of the Permanent Secretary
- Audit
- Protocol
- Public Private Partnership
- Reforms, SERVICOM and Anti-Corruption Unit
- Library Services

== Federal Ministers of Works ==
Name (Born-Died)		Portrait	Term of Office		Cabinet
Colonial Nigeria
1	Abubakar Tafawa Balewa (1912 –1966)		1951	1954	Macpherson
2	Inuwa Wada (1917– 2015)		1955	1 October 1960	Macpherson
Federation of Nigeria
2	Inuwa Wada (1917– 2015)		1 October 1960	May 1965	Balewa (I • II)
3	Shehu Shagari (1925 –2018)		May 1965	16 January 1966	Balewa (II)
4	Femi Okunnu (b. 1933)		6 July 1967	1975	Gowon (Federal Executive Council)
5	Olusegun Obasanjo (b. 1937)		January 1975	29 July 1975	Gowon (Federal Executive Council)
6	Olufemi Olumide (1938–2020)		29 July 1975	1976	Muhammed (Federal Executive Council)
7	Orho Esio Obada (1939–2020)		1976	1977	Obasanjo (Federal Executive Council)
8	Oberu Aribiah (b. 1938)		March 1977	24 July 1978	Obasanjo (Federal Executive Council)
9	Muhammed Shuwa (1939–2012)		24 July 1978	1979	Obasanjo (Federal Executive Council)
10	Sunday Essang (1940–1991)		December 1979	October 1983	Shagari (I)
11	Emmanuel Nsan (1932–2011)		October 1983	1984	Buhari (Federal Executive Council)
12	Hamza Abdullahi (1945–2019)		1984	1985	Buhari (Federal Executive Council)
13	Abubakar Umar (1925–2009)		1985	23 December 1987	Babangida (Federal Executive Council)
14	Mohammed Kontagora (b. 1937)		23 December 1987	1993	Babangida (Federal Executive Council)
15	Barnabas Gemade (1928–2001)		August 1993	17 November 1993	Shonekan (I)
16	Lateef Jakande (1929–2021)		November 1993	March 1995	Abacha (Federal Executive Council)
17	Abdulkareem Adisa (1948–2005)		March 1995	December 1997	Abacha (Federal Executive Council)
18	Garba Ali Mohammed (b. 1949)		December 1997	June 1999	Abubakar (Federal Executive Council)
19	Anthony Anenih (1933 –2018)		June 1999	July 2003	Obasanjo (I)
20	Adeseye Ogunlewe (b. 1943)		July 2003	March 2006	Obasanjo (II)
21	Obafemi Anibaba (b. 1944)		March 2006	September 2006	Obasanjo (II)
22	Cornelius Adebayo (b. 1944)		September 2006	January 2007	Obasanjo (II)
23	Hassan Muhammed Lawal (1954–2018)		17 December 2008	17 March 2010	Yar'Adua (I)
24	Mohammed Daggash (b. 1960)		6 April 2010	July 2011	Jonathan (I)
25	Mike Onolememen (b. 1965)		July 2011	November 2015	Jonathan (II)
26	Babatunde Fashola (b. 1963)		11 November 2015	29 May 2023	Buhari (I • II)
27	Dave Umahi (b. 1963)		21 August 2023	Incumbent	Tinubu (I)
