= Federal Ministry of Women Affairs and Social Development =

Government ministry in Nigeria

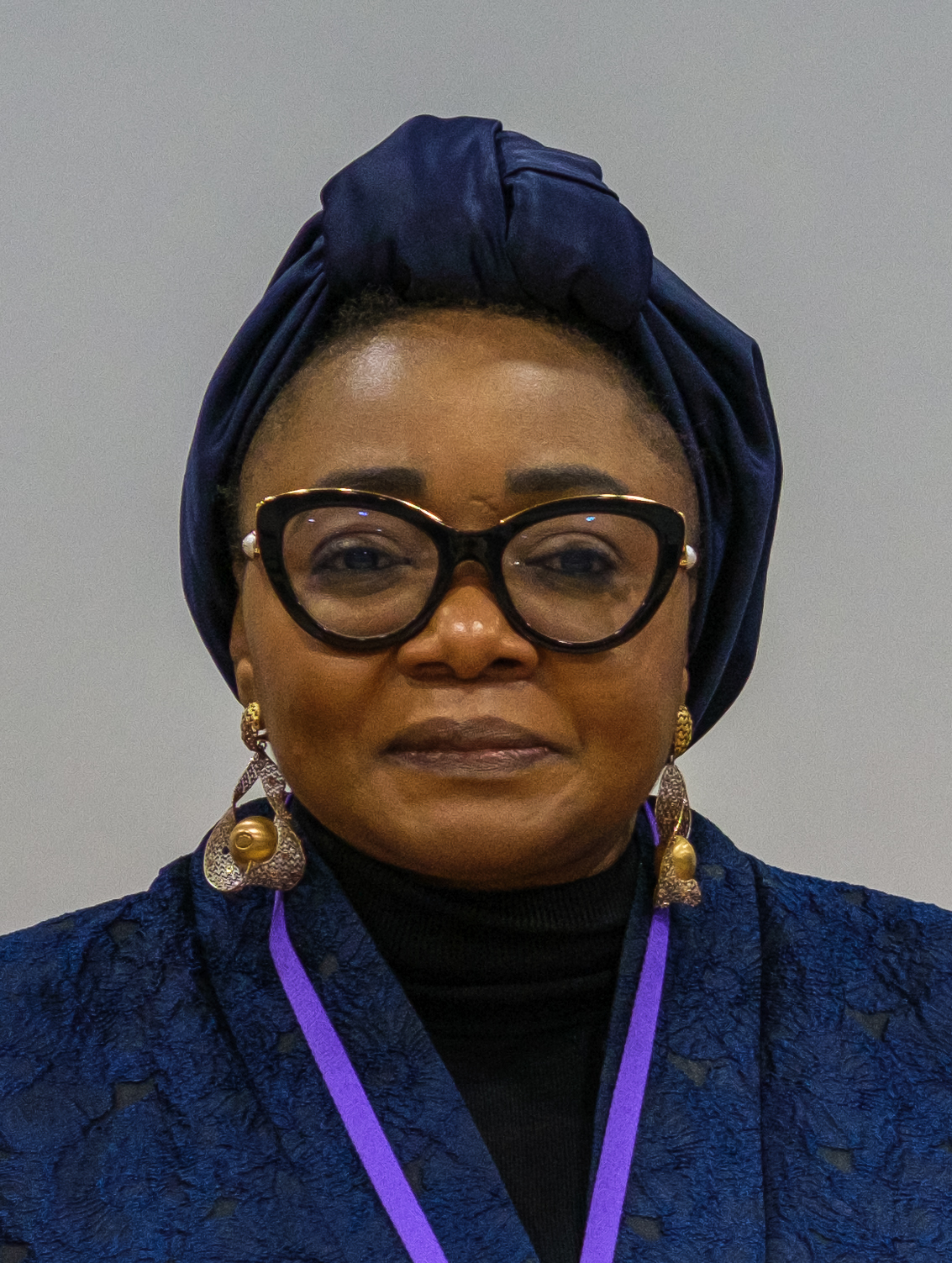

Federal ministry overview
- Headquarters: Abuja
- Minister responsible: Imaan Sulaiman-Ibrahim

The Federal Ministry of Women Affairs and Social Development is a part of the Federal Ministries of Nigeria that promotes the development of women and children in Nigeria. The ministry is currently headed by Imaan Sulaiman-Ibrahim.

== History and background ==
The Federal Ministry of Women Affairs and Social Development first originated in 1989 due to support from a United Nations Decree to focus on the development of women's issues and gender equality in developing nations. It was initially called the National Commission for Women until 1995, when it became the official federal Ministry that it is now, indicating progress towards the Beijing Platform of Action, a UN development project that was focused on advancing women's rights internationally.

Originally, the organization was headed by the First Lady at the time, but according to the official Ministry's website, the then First Lady, Maryam Babangida, was unable to get to the root of long-standing, systemic gender inequality issues with her implemented programmes, instead focusing on immediate relief. A scholar who wrote about a potential issue of First Ladies' intervention in government projects in Africa, is Jibrin Ibrahim. In this article, Ibrahim discusses how Babangida launched the Better Life for Rural Women Programme (BLP) in 1987. While the BLP assured that they were making strides towards improving gender equality for rural women, some scholars and observers saw Babangida's work in the BLP as possibly self-serving, working to boost her public image. Additionally, Babangida stated that she was not for feminism or women's liberation, but rather wanted to promote ideals such as motherhood and wifehood. Currently, the Ministry is not headed by the First Lady, but by Imaan Sulaiman-Ibrahim, and the organization within the Ministry has changed to be always led by an Honourable Minister.

== Organization ==
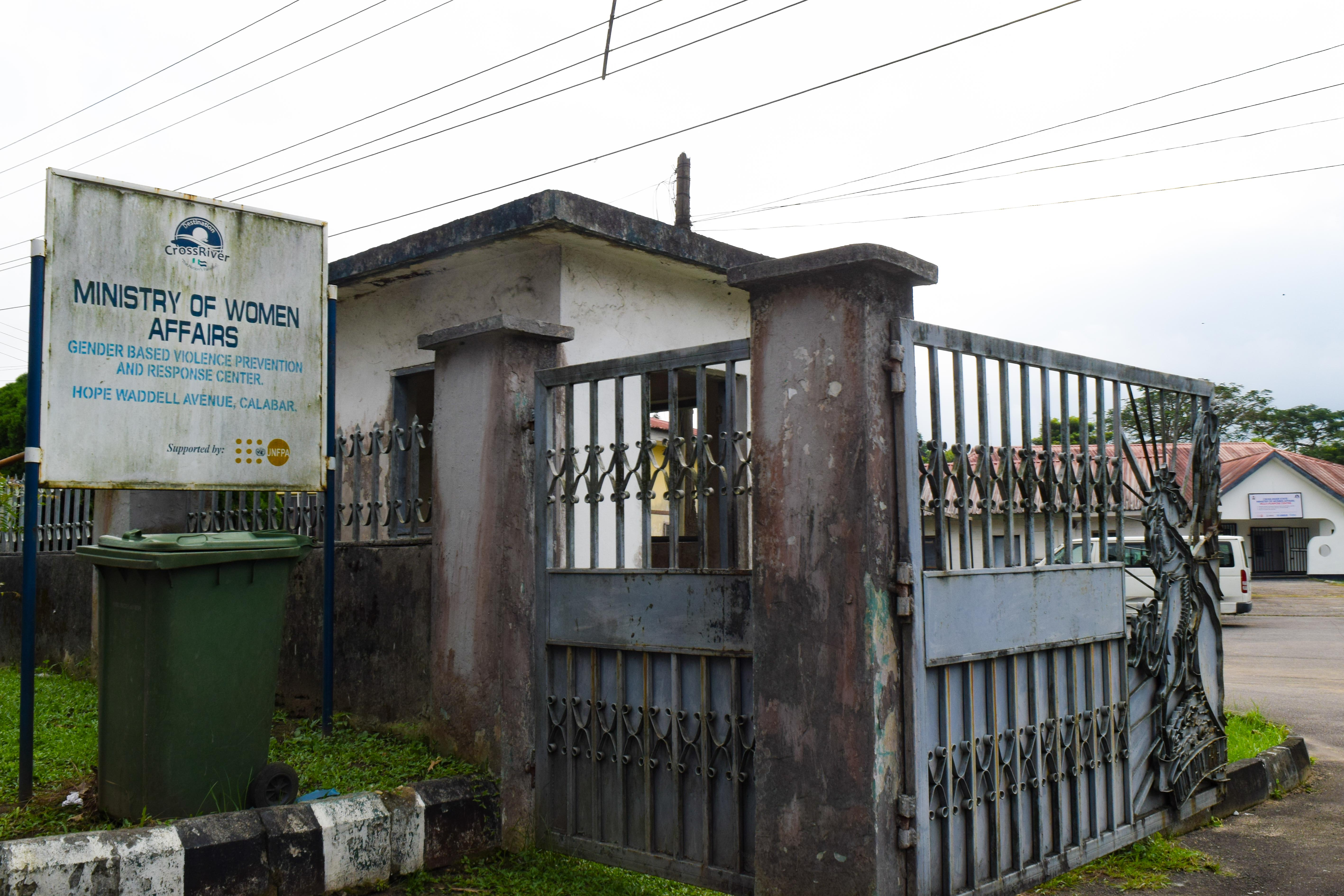
The Federal Ministry of Women Affairs and Social Development's office in Calabar, Cross River State, Nigeria.

The Ministry is headed by a Minister appointed by the President, assisted by a Permanent Secretary, who is a career civil servant, and the rest of the Ministry is organized through a hierarchy of roles shown below:

1. Honourable Minister
2. Permanent Secretary
3. Director (Women and Gender Affairs Department)
4. Director (Child Development Department)
5. Director (Rehabilitation Department)
6. Director (Economics Services)
7. Director (Social Welfare Department)
8. Director (Planning, Research and Statistics Department)
9. Director (Human Resource Management Department)
10. Director (Finance and Account Department)
11. Director (Legal Services)
12. Director (General Services)

Within the Ministry are also three main units: the Federal Audit Unit, the Anti-Corruption Unit (ACTU) and the Servicom Unit. The Ministry as a whole works within another agency, the National Centre for Women Development.

== List of Ministers ==
| Name | Term |
|---|---|
| Aisha Ismail | 1999–2003 |
| Rita Akpan | 2003–2005 |
| Maryam Ciroma | 2005–2007 |
| Saudatu Bungudu | 2007–2008 |
| Salamatu Hussain Suleiman | 2008–2010 |
| Josephine Anenih | 2010–2011 |
| Zainab Maina | 2011–2015 |
| Aisha Jummai Alhassan | 2015–2018 |
| Aisha Abubakar | 2018–2019 |
| Pauline Kedem Tallen | 2019– 2023 |
| Uju Kennedy-Ohanenye | 2023 - 2024 |
| Imaan Sulaiman-Ibrahim | 2024–Present |

== Functions and impact ==
The Ministry's objectives includes promoting health programmes and policies for women, such as aiming to fight sexual violence with the support of UNICEF, including female genital mutilation and child marriage. One of the policies that the Ministry has overseen was the National Gender Policy, a policy which the UNDP described as helping to include men and boys in the work regarding gender-based violence and HIV/AIDS.

Another issue that the Ministry has focused on in recent years is discrimination against those with HIV/AIDS in the workplace, working with the support of the UN to push for and implement non-discriminatory policy and to ensure proper care and protection of these individuals. While HIV rates have decreased in Nigeria, a report by the UNDP in 2014 provides evidence for a link between gender-based violence and HIV. In the report, the UNDP notes how the Federal Ministry of Women Affairs and Social Development was the operator of the single shelter for HIV-positive women in Nigeria, but according to some responders, the shelter was either no longer in service or believed that it could be operating better. While the Ministry appears to be committed to HIV policymaking and protection of HIV-positive individuals, the UNDP report describes how keeping shelters fully operating and open can be difficult due to lack of funds.

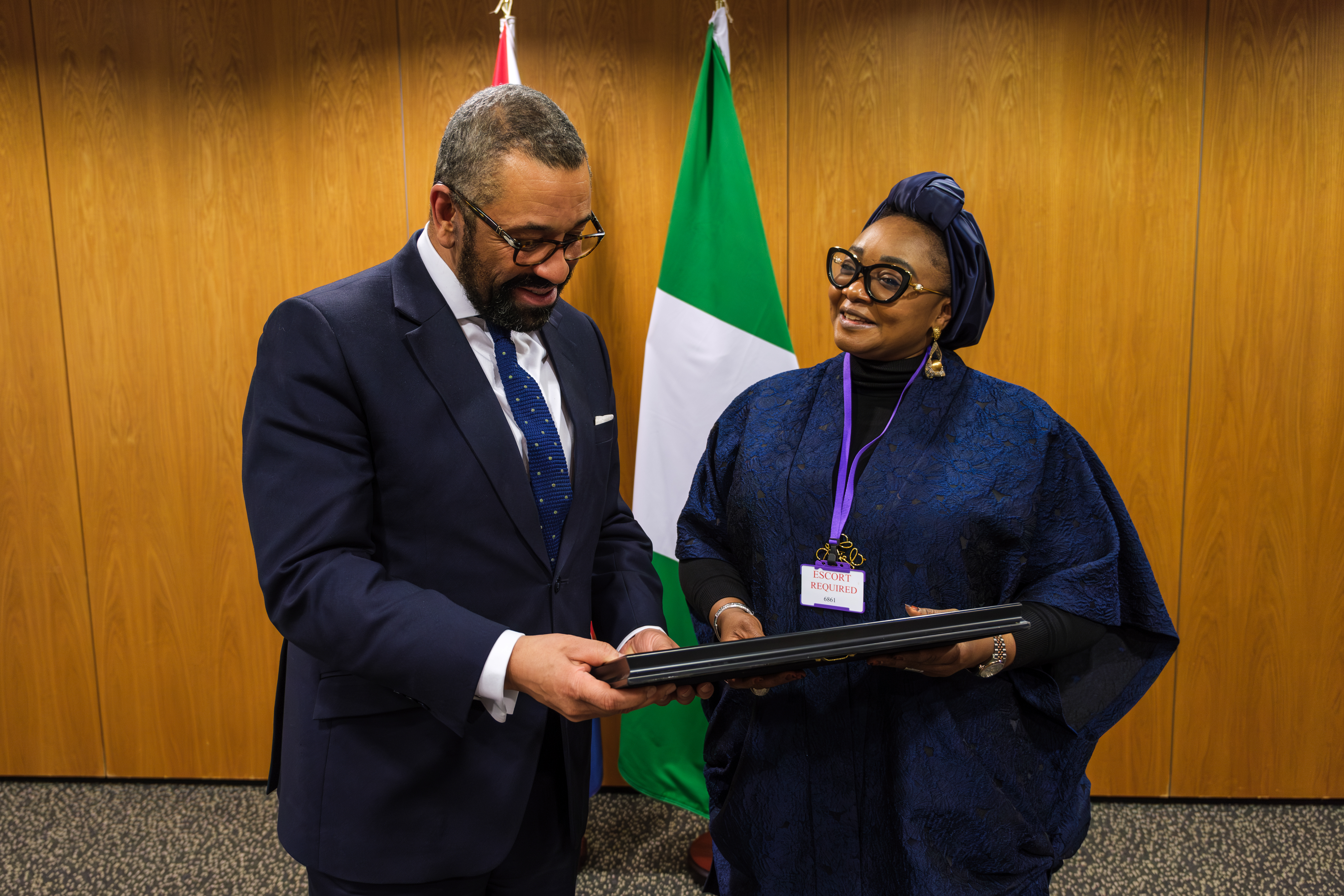
Minister of Women Affairs Imaan Sulaiman-Ibrahim Meets with UK Home Secretary James Cleverly

While gender inequality is a multifaceted issue, one author researched the correlation between faith and development efforts for gender equality in Nigeria as the country has a strong presence of ethnoreligious politics. For instance, according to a Pew Research Survey in 2012, 87% of those who responded said that religion was very important in their lives. Para-Mallam claims in her research that there are both negative and positive effects of religion for promoting gender equality as on one hand, religious traditions and expectations can oppress women, but on the other, there is evidence to suggest that becoming active members of religious groups can support women's empowerment. For examples of these separate possibilities, Para-Mallam includes a discussion of both women's involvement in religious circles as well as the impact of Sharia law in the country. One organization Para-Mallam delves into is the Women's Fellowship Unit (WFU) within the Church of Christ in Nigeria (COCIN). In this religious and indigenous organization, the promotion of development for women's rights within a faith-based framework is supported, and, according to the article, the group is regarded as an example of using religion to promote gender equality. Meanwhile, Para-Mallam also discusses how the presence of Sharia law in the governance of many women in Nigeria has had the possibility to further gender inequalities and women under Sharia may lack the ability to access the formal court system. Para-Mallam has also co-authored another piece on religion's role in women's movements,

In addition to the role of religion in women's rights, economically speaking, it is argued in a past McKinsey report that gender inequality also harms the Nigerian economy, claiming that if women were involved at the same level as men, the country's GDP could increase by 23% by 2025. Although this inequality remains persistent, examining the UN Sustainable Development Goals for Nigeria depicts a strong push for gender equity.

== See also ==
- Nigerian Civil Service
- Federal Ministries of Nigeria
