= Aisha Ismail =

Nigerian politician

The Honorable Minister Aisha Ismail MON

Personal details
- Born: Kano
- Education: Ahmadu Bello University

Aisha Ismail MON is a former Nigerian public servant and politician who served as Federal Minister of Women Affairs and Youth Development from June 1999 until May 2003.

== Biography ==
Aishatu Ismail was educated at Ahmadu Bello University and the University College of Swansea in Wales, United Kingdom.

She served in the Government of Kano State during the 1980s, becoming the first female commissioner in the Kano State Executive Council.

She became the first director general of the National Commission for Women in 1992.

At various times between 1992 and 1994, she was a Special Envoy to the Organisation of African Unity (now African Union), Head of Delegation to the United Nations Commission on the Status of Women in Vienna and President of the African Regional Coordinating Committee on the Integration of Women in Development of the United Nations Economic Commission for Africa.

Aisha served in the Cabinet of Olusegun Obasanjo as the Federal Minister of Women Affairs and Youth Development from 1999 until 2003. She worked on the passage of 2003 Child Rights Act, and during her tenure was a member of the opposition All Nigeria People's Party.

She was made a Member of the Order of the Niger awarded "for services to the nation"; she attended the 2014 National Conference as a delegate from Kano State.

After leaving public service, she dedicated herself to her private life.
