= Mohammed Musa Bello =

Nigerian politician (born 1959)

Mohammed Musa Bello CON

Minister of the Federal Capital Territory
- In office 11 November 2015 – 29 May 2023
- President: Muhammadu Buhari
- Minister of State: Ramatu Tijjani Aliyu
- Preceded by: Bala Mohammed
- Succeeded by: Nyesom Wike

Personal details
- Born: 8 January 1959 (age 67) Yola, Northern Region, British Nigeria (now in Adamawa State, Nigeria)
- Party: All Progressives Congress
- Education: Barewa College; Ahmadu Bello University
- Occupation: Politician; banker

Mohammed Musa Bello CON (born 8 January 1959) is a Nigerian banker and politician who served as the Minister of the Federal Capital Territory, from 2015 to 2023.

== Early life ==
Musa was born into a Fulani family in Yola; his father, Alhaji Musa Bello, was the Managing Director of Northern Nigeria Development Company from 1970 to 1976, and a trusted friend of President Muhammadu Buhari. He started his primary education in Yola before graduating from Our Lady's High School in Kaduna in 1971.

He attended Barewa College in Zaria from 1971 to 1976, where he received a Higher School Certificate. He then proceeded to Ahmadu Bello University in Zaria from 1977 to 1980, where he received a bachelors degree in business administration, and then returned in 1985 to pursue a master's degree in business administration.

== Career ==
In 1984, Bello was hired by Icon Limited (a subsidiary of Barings Bank and Morgan Guaranty Trust). He then spent six months undergoing training at J.P Morgan & Co., in commercial banking and risk management. He later became head of credit and marketing before later leaving to join the private sector.

He spent over twenty years in the corporate sector in various capacities, and was a Director of Habib Bank Plc, and other companies. Bello worked at the Bakabure Industrial Complex in Yola, as a General Manager in 1992. He served as a Member of the Technical Committee on Privatization (TPC). He was also a Member of the Adamawa State Chamber of Commerce, Industry, Mines and Agriculture. In 2006, President Olusegun Obasanjo appointed him Chairman of the National Hajj Commission of Nigeria where he served from 2007 to 2015.

== Minister of Federal Capital Territory ==
In May 2015, he was appointed Minister of Federal Capital Territory by President Muhammadu Buhari.

== Award ==
In October 2022, a Nigerian national honour of Commander of the Order of the Niger (CON) was conferred on him by President Muhammadu Buhari.

== See also ==
- Cabinet of Nigeria
