= Cabinet of Shehu Shagari =

- Cabinet of Nigeria
- Date established: 1 October 1979
- Date dissolved: 31 December 1983

Leadership and composition
- Head of state: Shehu Shagari
- Head of government: Shehu Shagari
- Member party: National Party of Nigeria (NPN)

Formation and history
- Predecessor: Government of General Olusegun Obasanjo
- Successor: Government of General Muhammadu Buhari

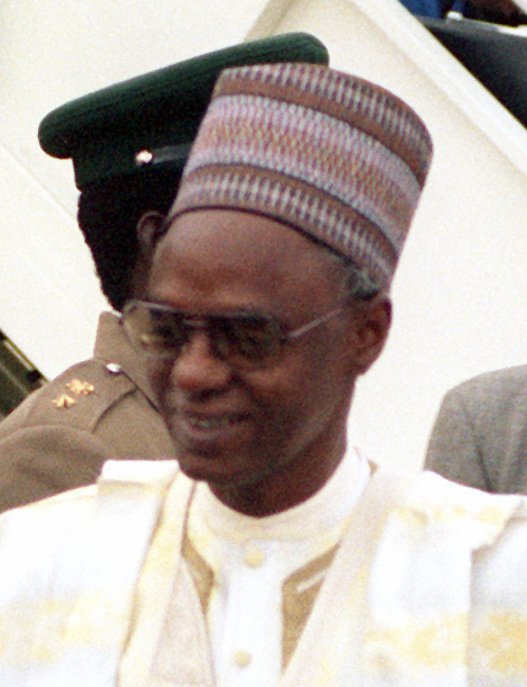
Shehu Shagari on 7 October 1980

The Cabinet of Shehu Shagari formed the government of Nigeria during the presidency of Shehu Shagari between 1979 and 1983, after the return to civilian rule with the Second Nigerian Republic. Among the cabinet Ministers are Adamu Ciroma, Bello Maitama Yusuf, Mamman Ali Makele etc. It was terminated by a military coup.

== History ==
Lieutenant General Olusegun Obasanjo became head of the government after an attempted coup in February 1976. He managed the transition to civilian rule in an election won by the National Party of Nigeria led by Shehu Shagari. Shagari took office on 1 October 1979. He then appointed 61 ministers, of whom 24 were of cabinet rank. The ministers were both Muslim and Christian fairly distributed ethno religious sections of the country Shagari made extensive use of the Cabinet Office, an organisation of leading professional civil servants, where it would have been more typical of a presidential system to rely more on political appointees.

Shagari's government was accused of having immensely powerful ministers in his cabinet. While he worked honestly, he didn't seem to have full grip of dishonest men working alongside him. Although, this view may be as result of the dictatorial military years preceding the second republic

Shehu Shagari's National Party of Nigeria (NPN) won the 1983 general elections. The political parties resorted to violence, arson, vote rigging and other malpractices in the struggle for victory. After the second election, Shagari removed all but seven of the former members of his cabinet, and appointed various respected technocrats such as Emeka Anyaoku in an effort to combat corruption within his cabinet. shagari also introduced a new ministry under Maitama Sule in order to launch his ethical revolution program which had War Against Indiscipline as part of it.

Soon after Shagari began his second term as president on 31 December 1983, the military staged a coup. It was led by Major Generals Muhammadu Buhari and Tunde Idiagbon. The coup was launched two days after Shagari had announced an austerity program, forced due to a fall in the price of oil, which provided 90% of government revenue. Shagari and many cabinet members were arrested and detained without trial.

== Ministers ==
Cabinet members included:

Office	Minister	Notes '
President	Shehu Shagari	1979–83
Vice-president	Alex Ifeanyichukwu Ekwueme	1979–83
Agriculture	Ibrahim Gusau	December 1979 – February 1982
Agriculture	Adamu Ciroma	February 1982 – October 1983
Attorney General and Justice	Richard Akinjide	December 1979 – October 1983
Aviation	Samuel Mafuyai	December 1979 – February 1982
Aviation	John Kadiya	February 1982 – October 1983
Commerce	Isaac Shaahu	December 1979 – February 1982
Commerce	Bello Maitama Yusuf	February 1982 – October 1983
Communications	Akanbi Oniyangi	December 1979 – February 1982
Communications	Audu Innocent Ogbeh	February 1982 – October 1983
Defence	Iya Abubakar	December 1979 – February 1982
Defence	Akanbi Oniyangi	February 1982 – October 1983
Education	I. C. Madubuike	December 1979 – February 1982
Education	Sylvester Ugoh	February 1982 – October 1983
Employment, Labor and Productivity	Adebisi Ogedengbe	December 1979 – February 1982
Employment, Labor and Productivity	Emmanuel Osanmor	February 1982 – October 1983
External Affairs	Ishaya Audu	December 1979 – October 1983
External Affairs	Emeka Anyaoku	1983
Federal Capital Territory	John Kadiya	December 1979 – February 1982
Federal Capital Territory	Abubakar Iro Danmusa	February 1982 – October 1983
Finance & Works	Sunday Essang	December 1979 – October 1983
Health	D. C. Ugwu	December 1979 – October 1983
Housing (and Environment from 1981)	Wahab Dosunmu	December 1979 – February 1982
Housing (and Environment from 1981)	Ahmed Musa	February 1982 – October 1983
Industries	I. J. Igbani	December 1979 – October 1983
Information	Garba Wushishi	February 1982 – October 1983
Internal Affairs	Maitama Bello Yusuf	December 1979 – 1981
Internal Affairs	Janet Akinrinade	(Minister of State) December 1979 – October 1983
Internal Affairs	Iya Abubakar	1981–1982
Internal Affairs	Ali Baba	(Minister of State)1981 – 1982
Internal Affairs	Ali Baba	1982 – 1983
Mines and Power	Mohammed Hassan	December 1979 – October 1983 External Affairs II || October 1983 - 31 December 1983
National Planning	Ebun Oyagbola	December 1979 – October 1983
Police Affairs	Emmanuel Osanmor	December 1979 – February 1982
Police Affairs	Ndagi Mahmudu	February 1982 – October 1983
Public Works & Finance	Victor Masi	December 1979 – October 1983
Science and Technology	Sylvester Ugoh	December 1979 – February 1982
Science and Technology	Wahab Dosunmu	February 1982 – October 1983
Social Welfare, Youth, Sports (to 1982) and Culture	Paulinus Amadike	December 1979 – February 1982
Sports Development	Adebisi Ogedengbe	February 1982 – October 1983
Steel Development	Paul Unongo	(MOS) December 1979 – February 1982
Steel Development	Mamman Makele	February 1982 – October 1983
Transport	Umaru Dikko	December 1979 – October 1983
Water Resources	Ndagi Mahmudu	December 1979 – February 1982
Water Resources	E. Y. Atanu	February 1982 – October 1983

== Sources ==
- Ajayi, Femi (2009). The Effect of Religion on the Political Process: The Case of the Federal Sharia Court of Appeal 1975–1990. iUniverse. ISBN 978-0-595-47828-6.
- Dingle, Derek T. (April 1984). "A Takeover in Nigeria". Black Enterprise. Earl G. Graves, Ltd. ISSN 0006-4165.
- Ehling, Holger; Holste-von-Mutius, Claus-Peter (1 January 2001). No Condition Is Permanent: Nigerian Writing and the Struggle for Democracy. Rodopi. ISBN 90-420-1486-5.
- Falola, Toyin; Heaton, Matthew M. (24 April 2008). A History of Nigeria. Cambridge University Press. ISBN 978-1-139-47203-6.
- Ifeoha Azikiwe (2013). Nigeria: Echoes of a Century: Volume One 1914–1999. AuthorHouse. ISBN 978-1-4817-2926-0.
- Inamete, Ufot Bassey (1 January 2001). Foreign Policy Decision-making in Nigeria. Susquehanna University Press. ISBN 978-1-57591-048-2.
- Ronke Iyabowale Ako-Nai (2013). Gender and Power Relations in Nigeria. Rowman & Littlefield. ISBN 978-0-7391-7778-5.
- Smith, Graham (25 September 2014). Federalism: The Multiethnic Challenge. Taylor & Francis. ISBN 978-1-317-89308-0.
