= Federal Ministries of Nigeria =

Executive government service in Nigeria

The Federal Ministries of Nigeria are civil service departments that are responsible for delivering various government services. Each ministry is headed by a Permanent Secretary who reports to a Minister in the Federal Cabinet. Some government functions are provided by "commissions" or parastatals (government-owned corporations) that may be independent or associated with a ministry.

== Ministries ==
At times, ministries are amalgamated and at other times they are split. Thus Halima Tayo Alao was appointed Minister of Environment and Housing on 26 July 2007 by President Umaru Yar'Adua. After a cabinet reshuffle, in December 2008 John Odey was appointed Minister of Environment and Hassan Muhammed Lawal was appointed Minister of Works and Housing. On 6 April 2010, Mohammed Daggash was appointed Minister of Works and Nduese Essien was appointed Minister of Lands, Housing and Urban Development. The table below lists current or past ministries.

| Ministry | Notes | Website |
|---|---|---|
| Agriculture and Food Safety | Regulates agricultural research, agriculture and national resources, forestry and veterinary research | https://agriculture.gov.ng/ |
| Art, Culture and Creative Economy | Regulates and overseas activities, institutions, and policies that promote national identity, creative expression, and cultural preservation | https://fmacce.gov.ng/ |
| Aviation and Aerospace Development | Regulates air travel and aviation services | aviation.gov.ng/ |
| Communications, Innovation and Digital Economy | it regulates technological advancement, digital transformation, and knowledge-based economy | fmcide.gov.ng/ |
| Defence | Consists of the defence services headquarters, the Nigerian Army, the Nigerian Air Force, the Nigerian Navy, and other defence agencies and departments | defence.gov.ng/ |
| Education | Directs education in Nigeria | education.gov.ng/ |
| Energy | To promote sustainable energy development in Nigeria | energy.gov.ng |
| Environment | Regulates environmental issues | environment.gov.ng/ |
| Federal Capital Territory | Administers the Federal Capital Territory (Abuja) | fcda.gov.ng/ |
| Finance | Manages, controls and monitors federal revenues and expenditures | finance.gov.ng |
| Foreign Affairs | Charged with the responsibility for the formulation, articulation, and pursuit of Nigerian foreign policy trust and objectives. | foreignaffairs.gov.ng/ |
| Health | Develop and implements policies and programs and undertakes other actions to deliver health services | health.gov.ng/ |
| Housing and Urban Development | | fmhud.gov.ng |
| Information and National Orientation | To establish and maintain a robust information dissemination mechanism that promotes our tourism potentials and enhances our cultural values. | fmic.gov.ng/ |
| Interior | To render to Nigerians and foreigners alike, diverse internal security and other ancillary services that are highly qualitative, efficient, courteous and transparent. | interior.gov.ng |
| Justice | Brings cases before the judiciary that are initiated or assumed by the government. Headed by the Attorney General, who is also Minister of Justice | justice.gov.ng/ |
| Labour and Productivity | Concerned with relations between workers and employees | labour.gov.ng |
| Lands and Urban Development | Formerly part of the Ministry of Works | landsandhousing.gov.ng |
| Mines and Steel Development | Encourages development of the country's solid mineral resources | minesandsteel.gov.ng |
| Niger Delta | Coordinates efforts to tackle the challenges of infrastructural development, environment protection and youth empowerment in the Niger Delta | nigerdelta.gov.ng/ |
| Petroleum Resources | Regulates upstream production and downstream distribution of petroleum products | petroleumresources.gov.ng/ |
| Police Affairs | In charge of the Nigeria Police Force | http://www.policeaffairs.gov.ng/ |
| Power | Responsible for providing social amenities such as power across the country | power.gov.ng |
| Science and Technology | Charts the course of scientific and technological development of the nation | scienceandtech.gov.ng/ |
| Industry, Trade and Investment | Regulates trade and investment | fmiti.gov.ng/ |
| Transportation | To ensure fast, safe, efficient, affordable, convenient, integrated and inter-modal transport system | transportation.gov.ng |
| Water Resources | Formed from Ministry of Agriculture and Water Resources in April 2010. | waterresources.gov.ng |
| Women Affairs | Promotes the development of women with equal rights and corresponding responsibilities | womenaffairs.gov.ng/ |
| Works | To facilitate the provision of adequate and affordable housing for all Nigerians | fmw.gov.ng/ |
| Youth Development | To formulate, implement, monitor and evaluate policies and programmes on youths towards wealth creation, youth empowerment, national unity and sustainable development. | fmyd.gov.ng |

== Commissions ==
| Commission | Notes | Website |
|---|---|---|
| Federal Civil Service | Executive body that has the authority to make appointments and transfers, and to exercise disciplinary control over all Federal Civil Servants | https://web.archive.org/web/20140512230804/http://fedcivilservice.gov.ng/ |
| National Sports | | |
| National Planning | Responsible for formulating medium term and long-term economic and development plans for the Nation | http://www.npc.gov.ng/ |
| Police Formation and Command | | |
| State House | | |
| NIDCOM | Nigerians in Diaspora Commission, provide for the engagement of Nigerians in Diaspora in the policies, projects and participation in the development of Nigeria and for the purpose of utilising the human capital and material resources of Nigerians in Diaspora towards the overall socio-economic, cultural and political development of Nigeria and for related matters. | https://nidcom.gov.ng/about-nidcom/ |

== See also ==
- Cabinet of Nigeria
- Nigerian Civil Service
