= Mobolaji Ajose-Adeogun =

Minister of the Federal Capital Territory of Nigeria
- In office March 1976 – 25 October 1979
- Preceded by: Position established
- Succeeded by: John Kadiya

Mobolaji Ajose-Adeogun(1926/1927-July 3, 2023) was the first minister of the Federal Capital Territory of Nigeria.
