= Grace Ekpiwhre =

Minister of Science and Technology
- In office 27 July 2007 – 17 December 2008
- Preceded by: Isoun Turner
- Succeeded by: Alhassan Bako Zaku

Minister of State Works, Housing and Urban Development
- Incumbent
- Assumed office 17 December 2008
- Preceded by: Halima Tayo Alao

Personal details
- Born: 4 January 1949 (age 77) Ethiope West, Delta State, Nigeria

Grace Ekpiwhre (4 January 1949) is career civil servant who retired in 2007. She was appointed by President Umaru Yar'Adua as Nigeria's Minister of Science and Technology in July 2007, and then became Minister of State Works, Housing and Urban Development in December 2008.

== Early life and education ==
Grace Ekpiwhre was born on 4 January 1949 in the village of Ikweghwu in Agharho, in the Ughelli North Local Government Area of Delta State. She grew up in a village called Ovu Inland in Ethiope West, Delta State. She attended Our Lady of Apostle College, Ijebu-Ode, Ogun State between (1962-1966), and Federal Government College Warri (1967-1968). She attended the University of Lagos, graduating with a BSc Zoology in June 1972.

== Career ==
Her first job was with the Bendel State civil service as Fisheries Officer Grade II. She moved up through the ranks, holding positions that included Director General of Women's Affairs and Director General of Government Parastatals. She became a Permanent Secretary in 1999, at one time in charge of Housing. She was appointed Head of Civil Service, Delta State in 2002, and Chairman, Civil Service Commission in 2007.

== Political appointments ==
Grace Ekpiwhre was appointed Minister of Science and Technology in July 2007. After a cabinet reshuffle in December 2008, she was appointed Minister of State Works, Housing and Urban Development.
