= Hamza Rafindadi Zayyad =

Nigerian civil Servant and an accountant (1937 - 2002)

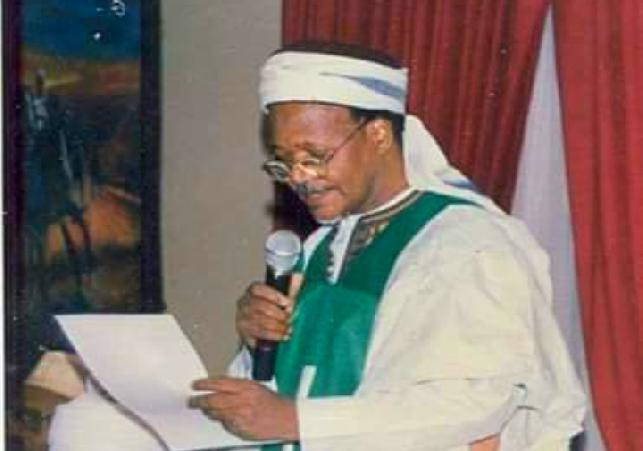
Hamza Rafindadi Zayyad

Hamza Rafindadi Zayyad (1937–2002) was the former head of the Technical Committee on Privatization and Commercialization in Nigeria. The Committee was designed to strengthen government's control of the direction of the country's then nascent privatization exercise.

Alhaji Rafindadi was one of the few individuals who had a visible and important presence in the early socio-economic institutions of Northern Nigeria and Nigeria.

== Family and early life ==
Hamza Zayyad was born on September 14, 1937, in Rafindadi, Katsina State. His grandfather named (waziri zayyana) was once the Waziri of Katsina (an advisory role), a position the grandson later held. He attended koranic school at the age of 4, then proceeded to Rafindadi Elementary School in 1945. After elementary education, he attended Katsina Middle School and then studied at Barewa College, Zaria (1951-1956), which was then an elite college in Northern Nigeria. From Barewa College, he joined Barclays bank in 1957. After a few years at the bank, he continued his academic pursuit, between 1958 and 1960 studying accounting in Kumasi. He later left the shores of Africa and went to Leeds College and the University at Birmingham, earning a degree in Accounting. He is mentor of the former Nigerian Minister and the former Kaduna State Governor, Nasir EL-Rufai.

== Professional career ==
As one of the few Nigerians with a post-graduate degree in accounting and the potential for positive influence in the post-colonial period, Rafindadi's post-graduate career was promising. In 1963, he started work at the Ministry of Finance, Northern Nigeria as an accountant. He rose through the ranks from accountant to senior accountant in 1965. In June 1966, he was appointed chief accountant of the Nigeria Produce Marketing Company, a central marketing agency for agricultural export produce. He was transferred from the position to Ahmadu Bello University later that year. He later rose in the field of finance to become the bursar of Ahmadu Bello University in 1968. From 1976 to 1981, he was the managing director of the New Nigeria Development Company (NNDC), an investment holding company. The position gave him the avenue to know and befriend leaders from Northern Nigeria such as Adamu Ciroma and to lead or be a board member in NNDC subsidiaries such as Arewa Textiles, Bank of the North and Bacita Sugar. In addition, as the leader of one of the largest firms in Northern Nigeria, he was in the position to drive meaningful socio-economic impact within region. He was offered a ministerial position by former head of state General Ibrahim Babangida but he declined the offer. After his retirement from NNDC, he formed Phoenix Investments, a finance consulting firm.

In 1986, after a downward turn in oil prices from its peak during the aftermath of the Iran crisis, Nigeria's government revenue began to dwindle, and it began selling some government assets. The Technical Committee on Privatization and Commercialization was created as a medium of setting the government's privatization agenda. Hamza Rafindadi Zayyad was then appointed the committee's first director. Today, the agency as evolved to become the Bureau of Public enterprises; one of the lasting non-ministerial government institutions in Nigeria's vacillating public agencies.

Though, they may be questions about his captaincy of the privatization program and his relationship with potentially corrupt elites in Nigeria including sale of assets to potential crooks. However, the agency was partly created to set the government's agenda and the rise of money bags in Nigeria was a result of the oil boom and subsequent administrations courting elites in the country.
