= Bolanle Awe =

Nigerian history professor (born 1933)

- Born: Bolanle Fajembola; 28 January 1933 (age 93); Ilesa, Colonial Nigeria
- Education: Perse School for Girls, St Andrews University, Somerville College, Oxford
- Known for: Nigerian Women's history, Oral history
- Spouse: Olumuyiwa Awe

Bolanle Awe (Yoruba: Bọ́láńlé (Fájẹ́m̄bọ́là) Awẹ́ born 28 January 1933) is a Nigerian and Yoruba history professor. She became the Pro-Chancellor of the University of Nigeria in Nsukka. She has been called a Nigerian "intellectual hero".

== Life and Early Education ==
Awe was born on 28 January 1933 in the town of Ilesa, Colonial Nigeria to Samuel Akindeji Fajembola and Mosebolatan Abede. Her father was originally from the town of Ibadan, and also he was a cocoa trader a manager at the John Holt & Co, a shipping and general merchandise company. Her mother was from the town of Ilesa, and was a member of the Abede family, a branch of the Royal House of Bilayirere, one of the 4 royal houses of Ilesa. Her mother was a teacher. Upon her father's transfer to one of the branches of John Holt & Co. in Ilesa, Awe was born. She was born in a community where practitioners of Islam, Christianity, and the Yoruba religion lived harmoniously. She attended Holy Trinity School, Omofe-Ilesha, before moving with her family to Ibadan when she was 8 years old, she later continued her education at St James Primary School, Okebola, Ibadan and St Anne's School, Ibadan. She took her A-levels at the Perse School for Girls in Cambridge. She went to St Andrews University in Scotland where she obtained a master's degree in history, before taking a doctorate in history at Somerville College, Oxford.

== Career ==
Awe started her Career as the first female lecturer at the Department of History, at the University of Ibadan, this advancent made her the first female academic staff in a Nigerian university. She one of the pioneers of the comprehensive study of women’s history and feminist history.

She rose to be a professor at the same university. She was one of the historians who allowed their evidence to include oral traditions. This meant that she was able to trace back histories before the arrival of Europeans. She was also active in identifying how the role of women in history was being overlooked and she co-founded the Women's Research and Documentation Centre (WORDOC) to promote the coordination of women's studies research and new methodologies to study Nigerian women. In 1982, she was made an Officer of the Order of the Federal Republic of Nigeria.

From 1990 to 1992 she served as the first chairperson of the National Commission for Women (NCW).

However, she resigned from her post in 1992 after the government restructured the commission, placing it under the control of the First Lady of Nigeria, Maryam Babangida.

In 1998, she retired and the following year, the department of African studies published a small book about her. After her retirement, she continued to research and in 2005 she became the Pro-Chancellor of the University of Nigeria in Nsukka.

When history professor Toyin Falola was interviewed he spoke about some Nigerian figures who he believes have been recognised prematurely for their achievements. In his argument he cites several Nigerian academics who are rightly what he calls "intellectual heroes". His list includes Chimamanda Ngozi Adichie, Chinua Achebe, Teslim Elias, Babatunde Fafunwa, Simeon Adebo, Bala Usman, Eni Njoku, Ayodele Awojobi and Bolanle Awe.

Professor Dele Layiwola presented a festschrift in honor of Professor Bolanle Awe. It was a two–day conference on 13 and 14 February at the University of Ibadan on the theme “Oral Traditions and Written Histories." Major collaborative partnership were the University of Texas at Austin, the University of Lagos, and the University of Ibadan.

== Private life ==
On Christmas Day, 1960, she married Olumuyiwa Awe. They had children and grand children. Her husband died in 2015 at the age of 82.

== Work ==
- Awe, Bolanle Praise Poems as Historical Data: The Example of the Yoruba Oríkì. Africa: Journal of the International African Institute; Vol. 44, No. 4 (Oct., 1974), pp. 331–349
- Bolanle Awe, ed. Nigerian Women in Historical Perspective. Sankore Publishers; Ibadan: Bookcraft, 1992 (ISBN 978-2030074).
- Ojetunji Aboyade and Bolanle Awe, editors. Footprints of the Ancestor: The Secret of Being. Special edn. Ibadan, Nigeria: Fountain Publications, c.1999
- Awe, Bolanle. OBA (DR), Samuel Odulana Odugade I: the 40th Olubadan of Ibadanland: a biography / Bolanle Awe, P. Adedtun Ogundeji S, Ademola Ajayi. 2nd edition, Centenary edition, Mapo, Ibadan: Tafak Publications, [2014].
