= Zainab Ibrahim Kuchi =

Minister of State for Power Nigeria

Ministry of Niger Delta Affairs
- In office 2011–2012
- Succeeded by: Darius Dickson Ishaku

Minister of State for Power
- In office 2011–2013

Personal details
- Occupation: lawyer, entrepreneur

Hajiya Zainab Ibrahim Kuchi was appointed as Nigeria's Minister of State for Power and Minister of Niger Delta State Affairs by former President Goodluck Jonathan. She was appointed in July 2011. She is also an entrepreneur who is the founder and CEO of Daralkuchi Group.

== Career ==
Zainab is also a lawyer and an entrepreneur with over thirty five years of legal and management experience. She started in 1981, where she worked with Niger State judiciary headquarters. After her NYSC, she was retained to work with the Ministry of Justice Minna and served there about eight and half years. Zainab worked at the Central Bank of Nigeria from May 1989 till December 2004 when she retired to start up her own legal consulting firm. She also is the founder and CEO of Daralkuchi Group.

=== Political career ===
Former President Jonathan appointed her as a minister in his cabinet to represent Niger state. She was also appointed as minister of state for Power. In November 2011, she announced the signing of an agreement with Sinohydro Corporation. The Chinese state-owned company was to build a 3,050-megawatt hydropower plant in Mambilla, Plateau in Taraba state. October 30, 2012, after a Federal Executive Council (FEC) meeting, President Jonathan directed that she swap her role with the former minister of state for Niger Delta Affairs, Dairus Ishaku. President Jonathan said the minor cabinet reshuffling was to strengthen the sectors in order to meet the expectations of Nigerians.

On September 11, 2013, Zainab was sacked as minister the minister of Power during a FEC meeting alongside eight other ministers. In 2014, she was appointed as Goodluck Jonathan’s Presidential Campaign coordinator for Niger state.
