= Abdulrahman Gimba =

Nigerian politician

Federal Minister of Sports
- In office 27 July 2007 – 29 October 2008
- Succeeded by: Sani Ndanusa

Personal details
- Born: 16 June 1945 (age 80) Niger State, Nigeria

Abdulrahman Hassan Gimba (born 16 June 1945) became Nigeria's Minister of Sports and Chairman of the National Sports Commission on 27 July 2007. He was dismissed on 29 October 2008, one casualty of a major cabinet reshuffle.

== Background ==
Abdulrahman Gimba was born on 16 June 1945 in Niger State. He attended Ahmadu Bello University, Zaria where he earned a law degree, and was called to the Bar in 1979. He was Registrar of the High Court of Justice, Sokoto (1975–1980). He was appointed a member of the Federal Government Commission of Enquiry into the Warri Crisis in 1997. He served as Senior Counsel, and then Chief Draftsman of the Niger State House of Assembly (1983–1989). Gimba was also Principal Partner, Summit Chambers, Chief Executive, Century Policy Consultants, Abuja and a member of the Northern Nigerian Strategic Analysis Group from 2005 to 2006.

== Minister of Sports ==
Abdulrahman Gimba was appointed Minister of Sports on 27 July 2007. He was against having a Nigerian contingent at the 2008 Olympic Games since he believed that the trip would be a waste of tax payers' money. He formally withdrew Nigeria's bid to host to final phase of the 2010 FIFA World Cup Qualifiers in Africa due to lack of funds. In October 2008 he was dismissed by President Umaru Yar'Adua on 29 October 2008, with the Minister of Science and Technology Alhassan Bako Zaku appointed supervising minister for the National Sports Commission. In December 2008, Sani Ndanusa was appointed Minister of Youths, Sports and Social Development.
