= Chartered Institute of Administration =

Nigerian professional body

- Formation: 1987
- Type: Professional association
- Headquarters: Lagos
- Region served: Nigeria
- Members: ACIA, MCIA, FCIA
- Official language: English
- President: Adm. (Dr.) Festus Oshoba
- Immediate Past President: Adm. Samson Olopade
- Past President: Adm. (Prof.) G. U. K. Chima
- Past President: Adm. (Dr.) Goddy Idaminabo
- Website: www.cia.org.ng
- Remarks: 08091505837

The Chartered Institute of Administration (CIA) is a Nigerian professional body established in 1987 that regulates training and practice of Administration in the public and private sectors.

The CIA was chartered by Act No 103, No. 76 Vol. 79 of 31 December 1992.

In December 2012 the CIA invested its seventh president, Dr. Goddy Idaminabo (now the immediate past president), at the institute's 23rd induction ceremony, which was held in Lagos. Three fellows were inducted, nine full members and 122 associate members.

In May 2013, Idaminabo criticized the Central Bank of Nigeria for a "policy somersault" when they introduced polymer bank notes, then soon afterwards announced plans to withdraw them.

In June 2013, Idaminabo announced that the CIA was planning to act as host to the Pan African All Administrators conference. In an interview with The Guardian (Nigeria), he stressed the importance of properly trained and qualified administrators, asserting that this would even help reduce corruption.

Hajiya Zainab Maina, appointed Minister of Women Affairs and Social Development in July 2011, is a Fellow of the institute (FCIA). King Emmanuel Adebowale Adebayo of Emure Ekiti, formerly the Nigerian Chief of Police, is another fellow.

Chief Richard Onwuka Egbule, appointed chairman of the National Salaries, Incomes and Wages Commission in August 2009, is a Fellow. The poet Tochukwu Callistus Ipere is a distinguished graduate.
