= Olajumoke Akinjide =

Nigerian politician

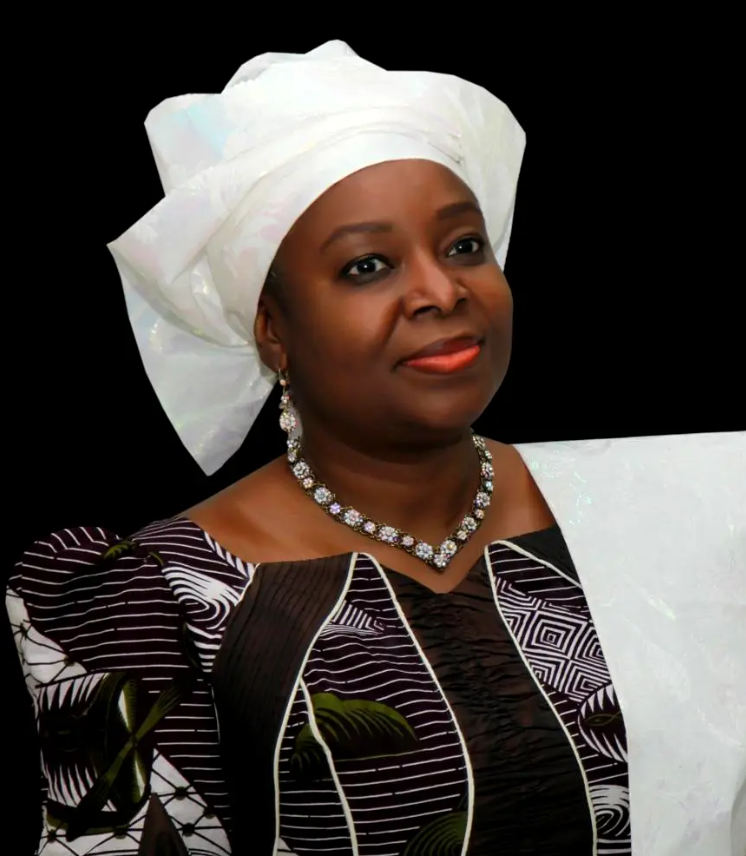

Minister of State for Federal Capital Territory (FCT)
- Succeeded by: Ramatu Tijani Aliyu

Personal details
- Born: 4 August 1959 (age 67) Oyo State, Nigeria
- Party: Peoples Democratic Party (Nigeria)
- Parent: Richard Akinjide (father)
- Education: King's College London, Harvard Law School
- Occupation: Business, Politician

Olajumoke Akinjide (born 4 August 1959) is a Nigerian politician from Oyo State, Nigeria. She was the Minister of State for Federal Capital Territory (FCT) appointed by the former President of Nigeria, Goodluck Jonathan in July, 2011 to serve in the Cabinet of Nigeria.

== Early life and family ==
Olajumoke Akinjide, also known as Jumoke Akinjide, was born on 4 August 1959 in Ibadan, Ona-Ara Local Government Area of Oyo state into the family of late Legal Luminary, Pa Osuolale Abimbola Richard Akinjide, SAN.

== Politics ==
Between May 2001 and September 2003 she served as the Special Assistant to the President on FCT matters and later as Special Assistant to the President on G77 matters and Nigerians in Diaspora (NIDO) under the then-President Olusegun Obasanjo.

She is also a grassroots politician and was a candidate for the senate seat, Oyo Central Senatorial District on the PDP platform in 2011, the same year she was appointed minister.

== Education ==
Akinjide attended Maryhill Convent School, Idi-Ape, Iwo Road, Agodi, Ibadan, from 1963 to 1968, where she obtained her First School Leaving Certificate and proceeded to St Louis Grammar School, Ibadan 1969 to 1974 where she got her West African School Certificate (WASSCE).

Akinjide holds an LLB (Hons) from King's College London, and master's degree in law (LLM) from Harvard Law School in the United States in 1981. In addition, she attended the Nigerian Law School and was called to the Nigerian Ba in July 1982.

She has a First Class Honours in the English Solicitors Final Examinations.

Akinjide has dual qualifications as Barrister and Solicitor of the Supreme Court of Nigeria and as a Solicitor of England and Wales in 1994. Oloye also is a fellow of the Chartered Institute of Abitrators (UK).

Oloye Jumoke worked at one of the top firms in London (Simmons & Simmons (1992-1994). Furthermore, Akinjide was the Managing Partner, AKINJIDE & CO., Joint Head of the Energy Law Department and Head of Company Law Department, (Aug. 1994 – May 2001). Between, 2003 – 2011, Akinjide was also the Principal Partner, NEWMAN LEGAL.

== Publications ==
She has spoken at several law conferences as a guest lecturer and published papers on the following topics:

Legal Aspects of International Environmental Protection (1996)

Current Legal Issues for Gas Production and Utilisation in Nigeria (1997)
