= Precious Sekibo =

Abiye Precious Sekibo

Federal Minister of Transportation
- In office 2003–2007
- Preceded by: Ojo Maduekwe
- Succeeded by: Diezani Allison-Madueke

Personal details
- Born: 1958 (age 67–68) Okrika, Rivers State, Nigeria
- Party: People's Democratic Party (PDP)

Dr. Abiye Samuel Precious Sekibo is a Nigerian doctor and politician who was Federal Minister of Transportation in the cabinet of President Olusegun Obasanjo, appointed in April 2003.

== Background ==
Abiye Sekibo was born in 1958 in Okrika, Rivers State. He attended the famous Okrika Grammar School, Okrika and read Medicine at the Lagos University Teaching Hospital. He was a House Officer at the University of Port Harcourt Teaching Hospital and underwent the compulsory one National Youth Service Corp at Ede. He was Doctor-In-Charge of St. Michael’s Clinic in Port-Harcourt (1986–1999). He was a director representing the Rivers State Government on the board of the West African Glass Industry Plc. He established the PreciousLife Medical Centre in Port Harcourt and Abuja. He was appointed a Special Assistant to the Governor of Rivers State, and served as Secretary to the Rivers State Government (1999–2003).

He was nominated and screened by the Senate of Federal Republic of Nigeria, and appointed Minister of Transport in July 2003.

== Minister of Transportation ==
In August 2003, Sekibo said the Federal Government was considering a scheme to support local shipping in the oil and gas industry. In September that year he spoke out against corruption in the ports, saying the Federal government was committed to stamping out the problem. Sekibo said the planned port reform would increase private sector involvement in port operation, and that government had no business being in business. He claimed that the government was not going to privatise the ports. However, the government would make private operators responsible for terminal operations, and for terminal buildings and equipment.

In June 2005, a train carrying 390,000 litres of gasoline to the north derailed in the Bodija Ojurin areas of Ibadan. Three of the tankers emptied their contents, and residents were forced to evacuate. Sekibo supported the Nigerian Railway Corporation (NRC) chief Abdulrahman Abubakar, who said the people were not entitle to compensation since they had been squatting on railway land.

In September 2005, Sekibo said that the government had approved in principle setting up a special authority to manage a 25-year railway development plan. It would administer a N396 billion fund to improve the ailing railway system, two-thirds of which would be provided by the Chinese government as a "grant loan". The new authority would encourage private sector participation under the Public-Private-Partnership (PPP) drive of the Ministry.

== Later career ==
In June 2008, Abiye Precious Sekibo appeared in Federal High Court to argue that Rivers State governor Rotimi Amaechi had not been legally elected, despite a Supreme Court judgement in his favor of 25 October 2007.
