= Rita Akpan =

Nigerian teacher

Federal Minister of Women Affairs
- In office July 2003 – June 2005
- Preceded by: Aishat Ismail
- Succeeded by: Maryam Ciroma

Rita Akpan (born 28 September 1944 in Akwa Ibom) is a Nigerian teacher who was Federal Minister of Women affairs in the cabinet of President Olusegun Obasanjo between July 2003 and June 2005.

== Career ==
From 1968 to 1986, Rita worked with the American International School, Victoria Island, Lagos and the Federal Ministry of Education. She served as Head of French Department, Federal Government Girls' College, Calabar, Federal Inspector of the French Language and later as Vice Principal, Federal Government Girls College, Calabar.

Rita Akpan speaking Ibibio language

Akpan was once a secretary to the Akwa Ibom State Government during the first tenure of the Governor Victor Attah administration. She was also a cabinet member during the first civilian administration of Akwa_ibom State. In 1992, she was appointed Special Adviser on Information and Culture to the Akwa_Ibom state Governor. She later served as State Commissioner for Education in 1993 and Secretary to the State Government of Akwa-Ibom State from 1999 to 2000.

== Minister of Women Affairs ==
In October 2004, during a workshop on the socio-economic implications of human trafficking and child labour, Akpan noted that Nigeria was the first and only country in West Africa to enact an anti-human trafficking act. In January 2005, Akpan introduced the second periodic report on Nigeria to the United Nations Committee on the Rights of the Child. She said Nigeria had taken concrete steps toward the Rights of the Child Convention since it had presented its initial report.

She was reported to have fallen from favor with President Obasanjo as being an associate of Akwa Ibom Governor Victor Attah, with whom Obasanjo had a disagreement. She was dropped from the cabinet in June 2005.
