= Sani Ndanusa =

Nigerian politician

Minister of Youths, Sports and Social Development
- In office 17 December 2008 – 17 March 2010
- Preceded by: Abdulrahman Gimba
- Succeeded by: Ibrahim Bio

Personal details
- Born: 5 May 1957 (age 68)
- Profession: Civil Servant, Politician

Sani Ndanusa (born 5 May 1957) is a Nigerian civil servant who was appointed Minister of Youths, Sports and Social Development in December 2008. He left office in March 2010 when Acting President Goodluck Jonathan dissolved his cabinet.

Sani Ndanusa obtained an MSc in Waste and Water Engineering from Loughborough University, United Kingdom. He was General Manager of the Niger State Water Board (1999-2001), and then became a permanent secretary of the board. In December 2003, he announced that the Water Board would give priority to drinking water supply, disconnecting concrete blocking and car wash crates and flower garage operators. The businesses would have to find other sources of supply.

He was appointed Niger State's commissioner for transportation and infrastructural development. At the same time, he was vice-president of the Nigerian Tennis Federation (NTF) for four years, and was appointed president of the NTF in 2001. He was also vice-president of the Nigeria 2008 Olympic Committee. Ndanusa was elected vice president of the Confederation of Africa Tennis in April 2003 and reelected in 2007.

President Umaru Yar'Adua appointed him Minister of Youths, Sports and Social Development and chairman, National Sports Commission in December 2008. In November 2009, there was controversy when the Nigeria Olympic Committee (NOC) disqualified Sani Ndanusa from the being elected president of the NOC. In December 2009, Sani Ndanusa vowed that Nigeria would post the best performance by Africa nations at the 2010 Commonwealth Games in New Delhi.
