= Yusuf Sulaiman =

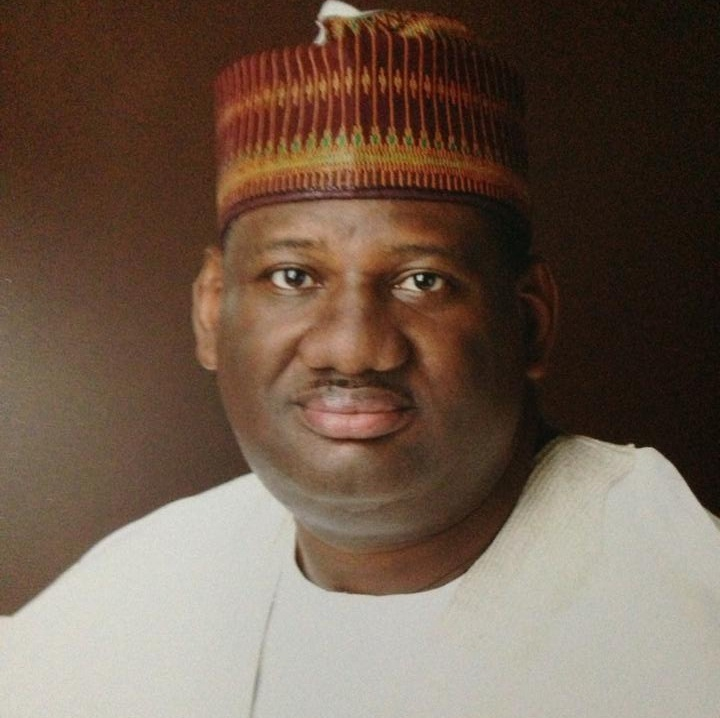

Federal Minister of Transport
- In office 6 April 2010 – July 2011
- Preceded by: Ibrahim Bio
- Succeeded by: Audu Idris Umar

Federal Minister of Sports
- In office July 2011 – 2 December 2011
- Preceded by: Ibrahim Bio
- Succeeded by: Bolaji Abdullahi

Personal details
- Born: 30 January 1963 (age 63) Sokoto, Nigeria
- Party: PDP

Alhaji Yusuf Sulaiman (or Suleiman) (born 30 January 1963) is a member of the traditional ruling family of the Sokoto Caliphate who was a civil servant before entering politics in Nigeria. He was appointed as Nigerian minister of transport on 6 April 2010, when acting president Goodluck Jonathan announced his new cabinet. He became minister of sports in July 2011 cabinet reshuffle. He left office in December 2011 when he decided to run in the People Democratic party (PDP) primaries for governorship of Sokoto State.

== Early career and education ==
Sulaiman was born in Gusau on 30 January 1963. He is a member of the ruling dynasty of the Sokoto Caliphate. His father, Alhaji Sulaiman Isa ibn Ibrahim, was great-grandson of Sultan Aliyu Karami ibn Muhammad Bello bn shekh Usman bn Fodio.

He holds a BSc degree in business administration from Ahmadu Bello University, Zaria (1986) and MBA (1989) from the same university. He attended the Harvard university Flagship course on privatization, the public Enterprises management program in 1995. He was also at the Kellog School of Management's Executive Development program in (2002), Harvard University Kennedy School's senior managers in Government Program (2001), University of Virginia Darden Graduate School of Business program on managing critical resources (2002), Cambridge Academy of Transport Shipping Insurance Course (2002), Kellogg Graduate school of Management Certificate in the soul of Leadership Program (2003).

He joined the Sokoto state service in September 1986 where he rose to the position of state director of industry in 1991. He worked in various positions in both the state and the federal government since then.

He was appointed executive director at the National Maritime Authority of Nigeria (now NIMASA) in September 1999. In February 2003 he resigned and ran for senate on the platform of People's Democratic Party (PDP) for the Sokoto East Senatorial District.

Before being appointed minister of transport, he was the chairman of the Governing Council of the National Teachers' Institute, Kaduna (NTI). He became chairman and CEO of Afro investors limited, private Equity firm after resigning as federal minister in 2012. In addition, he is also the current president and chief executive officer of Caspian Oil and Gas Limited.

== Minister of Transport (April 2010 – July 2011) ==
Sulaiman was appointed Minister of Transport on 6 April 2010. On assumption to office he declared his two priorities to be the completion of dredging of the lower Niger River to ensure year-round navigation from Warri in Delta State to Baro in Niger State. And the rehabilitation and modernization of railways In . In December 2010 he made an official four-hour boat trip from Lokoja in Kogi State to Onitsha in Anabra State along the newly dredged rivers.

And in March 2011, he said the ministry was working with other regencies to ensure both the rehabilitation of the narrow gauge network and the railway modernization efforts, so they could be brought into operation through concession .

As a minister, he said "The ministry was committed to transforming the nation's shipping industry to comply with global best practice". In December 2010 he was reported to have changed the director general of the Nigerian maritime Administration and Safety Egency (NIMASA) for abuse of office and subsequently recommended his removal.

== Minister of Sports (July 2011 – December 2011) ==
Suleiman was made minister of sports in July 2011 cabinet shuffle. Even though he served for less than six months before his resignation to engage in active politics, he was generally believed to have restored stability to the sports section. His effort in bringing together all the warring factions in football Administration, a feat hitherto believed to be impossible, finally ended the crises.

The general Dominc oneya committee he set up to reposition soccer administration in the country, greatly succeeded in brokering peace to the sector one of the members of that committee, Hon Elegbeleye was later appointed director-general of the national sports commission to succeed Mr. Patrick Ekeji who retired from service.

Accordingly, in July 2011, Suleiman met with representatives from the Nigeria Football Federation (NFF) and the rival Nigeria Football Association (NFA) and secured the commitment of the two groups to suspend all litigations. A condition for the committee which includes both NFF and NFA as members. The committee inaugurated in (August 2011) was charged with reviewing the Nigerian Football Federation The committee was inaugurated on 1 August 2011 charged with reviewing the Nigerian Football Federation.

On 2 December 2011 Suleiman resigned to contest for the governorship election in Sokoto State. The other candidates were incumbent governor Aliyu Magatakardan Wamakko and senator Abubakar Gada. On 14 December 2011 Bolaji Abdullahi, minister of youth development, was asked to oversee the ministry of sports.

In May 2012 Abdullahi was formally appointed as the new minister of sports.

== Later career ==
Suleiman is currently the president and chief executive officer of Caspian Oil and Gas Limited, an energy and petroleum service company. He is also the chairman of Afro investors Limited, a private equity and venture capital firm.

He has remained in politics since leaving office in December 2011. He is a major political force in Sokoto his home state.

However, in 2018 he moved to the All Progressive Congress (APC) to support the ruling party in realizing its people-oriented development program.

He was appointed the director-general of the APC campaign council in Sokoto State for both the gubernatorial and presidential campaign in (2019) general election. He directed and spearheaded a very successful campaign which produced all the three senators, nine out of eleven members of the house of representatives and sixteen out of thirty members of state house of Assembly. The governorship was lost narrowly with the least margin in the history of election in Nigeria.

== Personal life ==
Suleiman is married with children.

== See also ==
- All Progressives Congress
- Sa'adu Abubakar
- Sokoto State
- Sambo Dasuki
- NIMASA
- Gusau
