= Ojo Maduekwe =

Nigerian politician

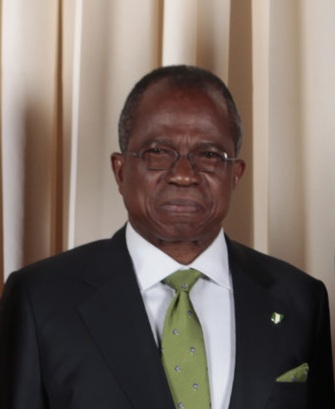

Minister of Transportation
- In office 2001–2003
- Preceded by: Kema Chikwe
- Succeeded by: Precious Sekibo

Foreign Minister of Nigeria
- In office July 26, 2007 – March 17, 2010
- Preceded by: Joy Ogwu
- Succeeded by: Henry Odein Ajumogobia

Personal details
- Born: May 6, 1945 Asaga, Ohafia, Eastern Region (now Abia State), Nigeria
- Died: June 29, 2016 (aged 71) Abuja, Nigeria
- Party: People's Democratic Party

Chief Ojo Maduekwe // (May 6, 1945 – June 29, 2016) was a Nigerian politician of Igbo origin, from Asaga, Ohafia, Abia State.

== Early life and education ==
He was educated at the University of Nigeria, Nsukka and graduate with a law degree in 1972.

== Political career ==
He was appointed Foreign Minister of Nigeria on July 26, 2007, by President Umaru Yar'Adua. He left office in March 2010 when Acting President Goodluck Jonathan dissolved his cabinet. He was National Secretary of the ruling political party, the Peoples Democratic Party (PDP). He worked as the deputy director of PDP presidential campaign 2011 Goodluck/Sambo ticket. He was nominated for SGF, but was subsequently dropped following criticism by eastern people.

Previously, Maduekwe had been appointed Culture and Tourism minister by President Olusegun Obasanjo in 1999. He was appointed Minister of Transport in 2001. In this position, he advocated for greater use of bicycles, although critics said that the roads were unsafe for cyclists. Maduekwe himself was pushed into a ditch by a bus while he was cycling to work.

== Trivia ==
- Maduekwe and former NDDC Chairman, Onyema Ugochukwu were fraternity brothers at the University of Nigeria

Party political offices
Preceded by Vincent Ogbulafor	National Secretary of the PDP; 2003 – 2016	Succeeded by Vacant
