= Yerima Lawal Ngama =

Nigerian politician

Yerima Lawal Ngama is a Nigerian politician from Yobe State, Nigeria.

Yerima Lawal Ngama has served as a Minister of Finance for the Nigerian Government. He was also a gubernatorial aspirant under the Peoples Democratic Party.
