= Salamatu Hussaini Suleiman =

Nigerian lawyer

Dr. Salamatu Hussaini Suleiman

Ecowas Commissioner for Political Affairs, Peace and Security
- Incumbent
- Assumed office January 2012

Minister of Women Affairs
- In office December 2008 – March 2010
- Preceded by: Saudatu Bungudu
- Succeeded by: Josephine Anenih

Personal details
- Born: Argungu, Kebbi State, Nigeria
- Education: LLB, Ahmadu Bello University, Zaria, Master's degree in Law, London School of Economics and Political Science
- Profession: Lawyer

Dr. Salamatu Hussaini Suleiman is a Nigerian lawyer, public administrator, and business advisor. Hussaini has held two ministerial appointments within the Federal Government of Nigeria and served as a Commissioner at the ECOWAS Commission. From 2012 to 2016, she was the Commissioner for Political Affairs, Peace and Security, becoming the first woman to hold that position. She served as the Chairperson of the National Human Rights Commission of Nigeria from 2021 until July 2025.

== Early life and education ==
Salamatu Hussaini was born on 27 October 1960 in Argungu, Kebbi State. Her father, Alkali Hussaini Gwandu, was an Islamic scholar and jurist. Her mother, Hajiya Safiyatu Hussaini, is a princess from the Gwandu Emirate Royal Family and holds the title of Gimbiyar Gwandu.

She attended Queen’s College, Yaba, Lagos, from 1973 to 1977, where she obtained a West African School Certificate with Division One. She then completed her A-Levels at the School of Basic Studies, Ahmadu Bello University (ABU), Zaria, in 1978. Hussaini earned an LLB (Hons) in Law from ABU in 1981. During her studies, she was elected Vice President of the Students' Union Government at the Kongo Campus and won the First Prize in the Faculty of Law's Annual Moot Court Competition. She was called to the Nigerian Bar in 1982 after attending the Nigerian Law School in Lagos. She later earned an LLM with Distinction in Multinational Enterprise and the Law from the London School of Economics and Political Science in 1987.

== Career ==
=== Early Legal and Banking Career (1982–2001) ===
Hussaini began her career as a State Counsel in the Sokoto State Ministry of Justice in 1982, rising to the position of Principal State Counsel by 1989. Her work involved public prosecution, civil litigation, and providing legal advice to government departments. In 1989, she transitioned to the corporate sector, joining Continental Merchant Bank Nigeria Plc. She initially worked in the Capital Markets Department, handling public issues and privatization, before serving as the Company Secretary from 1992 to 1996. She subsequently held the position of Secretary/Legal Adviser at the Aluminum Smelter Company of Nigeria Limited (ALSCON) from 1997 to 2001, where she managed legal affairs for a multi-billion-dollar joint venture.

=== Securities and Exchange Commission (2001–2008) ===
From 2001 to 2008, Hussaini served as the Secretary to the Commission and Director of Legal Services at the Securities and Exchange Commission (SEC). In this capacity, she provided legal advisory services, served as Secretary to the Board and its committees, and participated in numerous committees aimed at developing the Nigerian capital market. Her roles included:

- Chairperson of the SEC Rules and Regulations Committee.
- Chairperson of the E-Dividend Implementation Committee.
- Head of Secretariat for the Technical Committee for the review of the Investments and Securities Act.
- Member of the Presidential Inter-Agency Committee for the removal of Nigeria from the FATF list of Non-Cooperative Countries and Territories.

== Ministerial Appointments (2008–2011) ==
=== Minister of Women Affairs and Social Development (2008–2010) ===
- Appointed by President Umaru Musa Yar’Adua, Hussaini's tenure focused on the advancement of women's and children's rights. Initiatives under her leadership included:
- Facilitating a Federal Government policy to establish gender desks in all Ministries, Departments and Agencies (MDAs) to ensure gender mainstreaming.
- Establishing skill acquisition centers for the empowerment of women across Nigeria.
- Promoting the increased participation of women in politics.

=== Minister of State for Foreign Affairs (2010–2011) ===
- Reappointed by President Goodluck Jonathan, her achievements in this role included:
- Representing Nigeria at the United Nations General Assembly, with interventions on women and child rights and security sector reform.
- Enhancing border security through engagement with neighbouring countries and border communities.
- Leading awareness campaigns against the proliferation of small arms and light weapons.
- Overseeing the completion and movement of the Ministry of Foreign Affairs in Nigeria to a new headquarters building.

=== ECOWAS Commission (2012–2016) ===
As the Commissioner for Political Affairs, Peace and Security, Hussaini's responsibilities and achievements encompassed:

- Coordinating the deployment of the ECOWAS Standby Force on military missions, including the ECOWAS Mission in Guinea Bissau (ECOMIB) and the African Led International Support Mission to Mali (AFISMA).
- Implementing the ECOWAS Integrated Maritime Strategy, which led to the establishment of three Maritime Zones and a Regional Center.
- Overseeing a Defence and Security Sector Reform programme in Guinea Bissau.
- Securing resource mobilisation for the Commission, including military equipment from the USA, Germany, and China.
- Assisting ECOWAS Member States in conducting elections and establishing National Early Warning and Response Mechanisms.

== Board Memberships (2016–Present) ==
Since leaving the ECOWAS Commission, Hussaini has run her own legal firm, Hussaini Suleiman & Co. She also holds or has held several corporate and advisory positions, including:

- Chairperson, National Human Rights Commission (2021–July 2025)
- Chairperson, NGX Regulation Limited (2023–2005)
- Independent Non-Executive Director, Flour Mills of Nigeria Plc (2017–present)
- Independent Non-Executive Director, Stanbic IBTC Holdings Plc (2016–2024)
- Member, ECOWAS Council of the Wise
- Vice Chair, West African Network for Peacebuilding (WANEP)
- Member, Ahmadu Bello University Endowment Foundation Board of Trustees
- Member, Board of Trustees, Queen’s College Old Girls Association

== Professional Development ==
Hussaini has completed executive education programs at several institutions, including:

- Driving Digital Strategy and Disruptive Innovation at Harvard Business School (2024, 2023).
- Leadership in Development at the Harvard Kennedy School (2014).
- Compensation Committees and Corporate Governance training at Harvard Business School and Euromoney UK (2017, 2019).

== Philanthropy ==
In 2007, Hussaini founded the Alkali Hussaini Foundation, which focuses on poverty eradication and empowerment. The foundation has collaborated with entities such as the Federal Ministry of Women Affairs, the Bill and Melinda Gates Foundation (via PACT Nigeria), and the T.Y. Danjuma Foundation. Its projects have included:

- Establishing skill acquisition centers in Birnin-Kebbi, Gwandu, and Argungu, offering training in computing, tailoring, and adult literacy.
- Upgrading a primary school in Madadi Village, Gwandu Local Government Area.
- Enrolling orphans in primary and secondary schools in Birnin-Kebbi.
- Providing empowerment materials such as grinding machines, irrigation pumps, and computers.
- Constructing boreholes for potable water in collaboration with the Nigerian Turkish International Colleges (NTIC) Foundation.

She also serves as the Grand Patron of the Salamatu Hussaini Government Girls Secondary School in Birnin-Kebbi, where she provides material support and mentors students.

== Awards and honours ==
Hussaini has received several recognitions, including:

- Honorary Doctorate Degree (Doctor of Letters) from the University of Abuja (2019)
- Fellow of the Institute of Chartered Mediators and Conciliators (FICMC) (2019)
- West African Peace Building Fellowship from the West African Network for Peacebuilding
- ABU Alumni Career Service Award (2018)
- Sheikh Abdullahi Fodio Award for Distinguished Service from the Gwandu Emirate Development Association (2001)

== Memberships ==
She is a member of several professional bodies, including the Nigerian Bar Association, the International Bar Association, the LSE Alumni Association, and the Institute of Directors.

== Languages ==
- English
- Hausa
