= Saudatu Bungudu =

Nigerian politician

Saudatu Usman Bungudu

Federal Minister for Women Affairs
- In office 26 July 2007 – 29 Oct 2008
- Preceded by: Maryam Ciroma
- Succeeded by: Salamatu Hussaini Suleiman

Personal details
- Born: January 15, 1942 (age 84) Bungudu, Zamfara State, Nigeria
- Education: Uthman dan Fodiyo University

Saudatu Usman Bungudu (born 15 January 1942 in Bungudu, Zamfara state Nigeria) was appointed Nigeria's Women Affairs and Social Development minister in July 2007. She was succeeded by Salamatu Hussaini Suleiman and Preceded by Maryam Ciroma. She was relieved of her post on 29 October 2008 in a cabinet reshuffle.

She graduated from Uthman dan Fodiyo University before first becoming commissioner of Women and Children Affairs in Zamfara State and later federal minister. During her tenure as a minister of Nigeria's Women Affairs and social Development ministry, she decried the judgement passed by an upper area court in Lafia, Nassarawa state in the case of the rape of a nine-month-old baby.

== See also ==
- Nigerian Ministry of Women Affairs
