= Adamu Ciroma =

Nigerian politician (1934–2018)

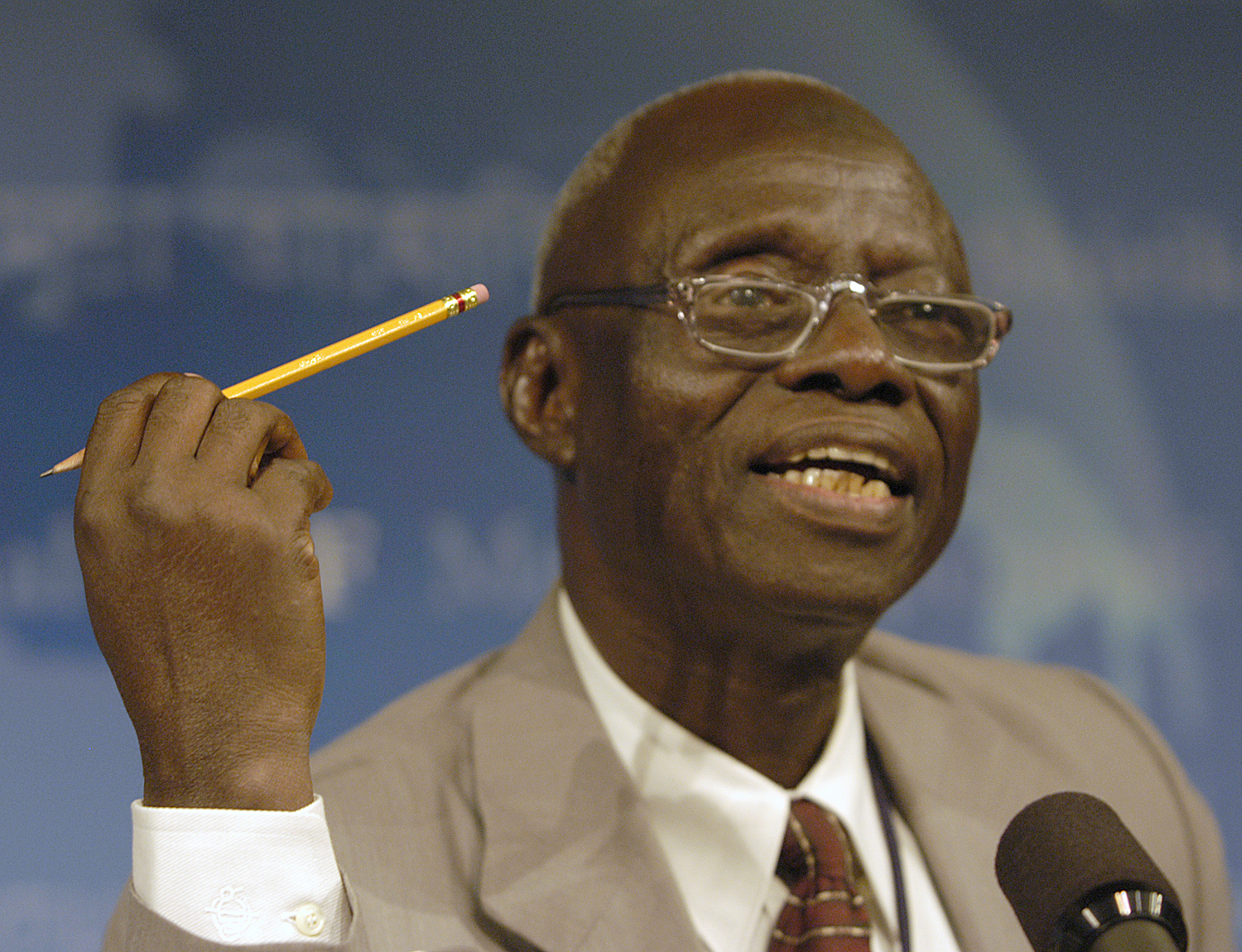
- Adamu Ciroma at the IMF 2002 Annual Meetings

4th Governor of the Central Bank of Nigeria
- In office 24 September 1975 – 28 June 1977
- Preceded by: Clement Isong
- Succeeded by: Ola Vincent

Federal Minister of Finance
- In office June 1999 – May 2003
- Preceded by: Ismaila Usman
- Succeeded by: Ngozi Okonjo-Iweala

Personal details
- Born: 20 November 1934 Potiskum, Northern Region, British Nigeria
- Died: 5 July 2018 (aged 83) Abuja, Nigeria
- Spouse: Maryam Ciroma

Adamu Ciroma (20 November 1934 – 5 July 2018) was a Nigerian politician and Governor of the Central Bank of Nigeria, born to a Bole family in Potiskum, Yobe State. He was a member of the People's Democratic Party.

== Second Republic career ==
In 1979, Ciroma was one of the National Party of Nigeria (NPN) presidential aspirants who contested the party's presidential primary, in which he was supposedly sponsored by the faceless Kaduna Mafia, a rumored group of northern intellectuals, serving officers and bureaucrats stationed around Kaduna. He came third in the primary, behind Shehu Shagari and Maitama Sule, his candidacy having been partly financed by Hamza Rafindadi Zayyad, the head of the New Nigeria Development Company.

Ciroma was briefly the secretary of the NPN and he later served at various times as Minister for Industries, Agriculture and Finance. As a senior cabinet minister in the Shagari administration, he played pivotal roles in the implementation of the president's agenda especially in the areas of food production and working with international agencies to develop an Agricultural Development Project (ADP). In September 1983, he was made the chairman of a presidential transition committee, which further demonstrated the trust the president had in his capabilities. The committee was mandated to make proposals on how to re-structure the federal government which was going through a crisis of confidence.

== Fourth Republic career ==
Ciroma was a founding member of the People's Democratic Party (PDP). He served as Minister of Finance in the government of Olusegun Obasanjo from 1999 to 2003. Currently, his wife Maryam Ciroma holds the position of PDP National Women leader in Nigeria.
