= Zainab Maina =

Nigerian politician

Hajiya Zaina Maina
- Born: 7 August 1948 (age 78); Adamawa state Nigeria
- Education: Kaduna Polytechnic
- Occupation: Politician
- Organization: Women 4 peace
- Notable work: National president, National council for women societies ( NCWS)- 1997-2001
- Political party: PDP
- Awards: National Award of excellence towards women Development Merit Award by the mayor of Atlanta

Hajiya Zainab Maina, FCIA, MFR (born 7 August 1948) was the Minister of Women Affairs and Social Development of the Federal Republic of Nigeria. She was appointed in July 2011.

== Education and personal life ==
Zainab Maina hails from Adamawa State in North-East Nigeria. She was educated at Kaduna Polytechnic where she obtained a Diploma in Administration and Higher National Diploma in Catering and Hotel Management. In addition, she also obtained a certificate in Secretarial Studies from the Federal Training Centre Kaduna and the Centre for Development & Population, Washington DC, USA where she received a Certificate in Institution Building Activities. She is married to Alhaji Umar Joji Maina, the Dan-maliki of Mubi in Adamawa State and they have children.

== Political and governmental career ==
Prior to her ministerial appointment in July 2011, Zainab Maina was:

- Board Chairman, National Commission for Nomadic Education, Kaduna (2009–2011);
- Board Chairman, Garki Microfinance Bank (1998);
- Board Chairman, NCWS, Garki Microfinance Bank, Abuja (1997);
- Deputy Chairman, Police Community Relations Committee FCT Command (1998-Date);
- Member, Vision 2010 Committee (1997);
- Board Member, National Programme on Immunization (1998–2000);
- Board Member, Adamawa State Primary Schools Board (1991–1994);
- Board Member, Family Economic Advancement Programme (FEAP) (1997–2000).

She was the National President – National Council for Women Societies (NCWS), Nigeria (1997-2001). In the ruling party in Nigeria, Peoples Democratic Party (PDP), Zainab Maina holds sway as part of the think-tank as Member, PDP Elders Committee; Member, PDP Board of Trustees; executive director, Women Affairs of the Jonathan/Sambo Presidential Campaign (2010); Member, PDP Presidential Electoral/Screening Committee (2010); National Women Representative, PDP Presidential Campaign Council (2007); Delegate, National Political Reform Conference (NPRC)-2005; Women Representative, PDP Reconciliation Committee on theExecutive/Legislative Impasse(2002); International Convener, Home Economics and Consumer Affairs International Council of Women (ICW) Bangkok, Thailand (1993).

== Non-governmental work ==
- Founder and President, Women for Peace Initiative (WOPI) Nigeria
- Patron, Young Muslim Women Association, Nigeria
- Sub-Regional Coordinator- Anglophone Africa, International Council for Women
- Member, World Association of NGOs (WANGO)
- Member, West African Civil Society Forum (WACSOF)
- INGO Ambassador, International Non-Governmental Organization(London, UK)

== Awards and honours ==
- National Award of Excellence towards Women Development Abuja, Nigeria
- Jean Harris Award – Rotary International
- Winner of the Distinguished Eagle Achievement Award Newark, New Jersey, USA
- Amazon Women Award for Contribution towards the Development of Womanhood, Lagos, Nigeria.
- Africa Youth Congress Award on the authority of the Senate Headquarters, Banjul, the Gambia
- Merit Award by the Mayor of Atlanta, USA
- Meritorious Certificate for Loyal and Devoted Services to Development by the Nawar-U-Deen Society of Nigeria
- Certificate of Recognition – University of Kansas, Lawrence, USA
- Quintessence Award for Remarkable Contribution to Humanity by media in support of Humanity (MISH)
- Ambassador for peace by the Universal Peace Federation and the Inter-Religious and International federation for world peace
- Honorary citizen of Kansas City, USA
- Fellow, African Business School – FABS
- Fellow Chartered Institute of Administration – FCIA
- Member of the Order of the Federal Republic – MFR
