= Maryam Ciroma =

Nigerian politician

Managing Director National Inland Waterways Authority, Lokoja, Nigeria

Federal Minister of Women Affairs
- In office July 2005 – May 2007
- Preceded by: Rita Akpan
- Succeeded by: Saudatu Bungudu

Personal details
- Born: 11 September 1954 (age 71) Nigeria, United Kingdom
- Spouse: Adamu Ciroma
- Education: Ahmadu Bello University

Hajia Maryam Inna Ciroma (born 11 September 1954) was appointed Nigerian minister of Women Affairs in July 2005 to 2007 by President Olusegun Obasanjo. She was replaced by Saudatu Bungudu when President Umaru Yar'Adua swore in his cabinet in July 2007. She was succeeded by Saudatu Bungudu and Preceded by Rita Akpan.

== Background ==
Ciroma was born on 11 September 1954 in Borno State. She attended Ahmadu Bello University, Zaria, graduating in 1978 with a degree in political science, and later obtained a postgraduate diploma in Public Administration. She worked as cadet editor, NTA Kaduna, before joining the federal civil service where she worked from 1980 to 1985. She then became Chairman/Chief Executive of Intis Investment Company.

She is the widow of Mallam Adamu Ciroma, a late Governor of the Central Bank of Nigeria and Minister of Finance who was chairman of the Obasanjo 2003 re-election campaign organization.

== Political career ==
In 2003, Ciroma made a bid to become the People's Democratic Party (PDP) candidate for the Borno South Senatorial District. She was appointed Minister of State for Women Affairs in July 2005, replacing Rita Akpan. She retained this position in the major reshuffle of January 2007. In August 2005, she started a nationwide advocacy tour of the 36 states of the Nigerian Federation on matters relating to child's rights and discrimination against women. Before the 2007 elections, she called for a percentage of electoral positions to be reserved for women, decrying the marginalization of women in Nigerian politics.

During her time in office, the Federal Government approved the National Gender Policy in pursuance of gender equality and children welfare in the country. In January 2007 her ministry issued "National Guidelines and Standards of Practice for Orphans and Vulnerable Children". Speaking in May 2007 of the action plan spelled out in this report, Ciroma said "Without taking determined steps to address the specific needs of children, there will be no chance of meeting the Millennium Development Goals".

After leaving office, Ciroma became National Woman Leader of the PDP. Hajia Maryam Inna Ciroma also served as managing director: National Inland Waterways Authority, Lokoja, Kogi State Nigeria. She turned around Water Transportation in Nigeria and embarked on massive enlightenment programs about safety on Nigerian Waterways. In December 2014 she was recognized by the ECOWAS Students body of West African Students Union Parliament-WASUP with the WASUP Kwame Nkrumah Honor (www.wasuonline.org). The Nigerian Coordinator for WASUP Comr. Daniel Emeka Nwachukwu, described her as "a great women, leader and mentor and example of selfless service for both women and children rights, with positive effects on the youths" for her contributions to Nation Building.

She is a member of the national working group for the supporting the advance of gender equality (SAGE) initiative in Nigeria and attended a meeting hosted by president Muhammadu Buhari on March 23, 2021, to mark the international women's day in Nigeria. Maryam initiated a nationwide advocacy tour of the 36 states on matters relating to child rights and discrimination against women.

== Skills ==
- An Expert in coaching how gender equality can be achieved and how to formulate policies that can drive it.
- Good understanding on how to mentor people and advocates effectively for gender equality.
