= Josephine Anenih =

Nigerian feminist and politician

Iyom Josephine Anenih

Federal Minister of Women Affairs
- Incumbent
- Assumed office 6 April 2010
- Preceded by: Salamatu Hussaini Suleiman

Personal details
- Born: 6 July 1948 (age 78) Sokoto, Nigeria
- Party: People's Democratic Party
- Education: University of Ife, University of Benin

Iyom Josephine Anenih (born 6 July 1948) is a Nigerian politician who was appointed Minister of Women Affairs on 6 April 2010, when Acting President Goodluck Jonathan announced his new cabinet.

== Early life and education ==
Josephine Anenih was Born in Sokoto in 1948 into a christian family. Her father was a civil servant with the Public Works Department, and as a result of his postings the family moved across different states in Nigeria.

She completed her secondary education at Queen's College, Lagos. She later studied law, obtaining a B.Ed, LLB, and B.L. from the University of Ife (1974/75) and the University of Benin.

== Personal life ==
Josephine Anenih to Tony Anenih (1933–2018) who served as the Nigeria's Minister of Works after his appointment by President Olusegun Obasanjo's in 1999.

== Career ==
Anenih served as the chairperson of the Federation of Women Lawyers from 1994 to 2000. She later became the first National Woman Leader of the People's Democratic Party (PDP) from 1999 to 2005.

In April 2002, she stated that the implementation of the Sharia legal system in Kano State had ensured the promotion of women's rights as dictated by Islam.

She served as the Special Adviser on Women Affairs to President Obasanjo until 2006.

In 2009, she participated in the Senior Executive Course of the National Institute for Policy and Strategic Studies (NIPSS), Kuru, Jos. She was also a delegate to the National Conference held in 2014.

== Professional affiliations ==
Anenih was one of the founders of the Women Foundation Nigeria (WFN), an organization established to promote women's empowerment and encourage Nigerian women to engage in discussions on global women's issues and political participation.

She is a member of the Gender Electoral and Constitutional Memoranda Committee, which aims to incorporate women's perspectives in Nigeria's Electoral Laws and reforms.

She currently served as the Chairperson of the Women Interest Group Forum of the African Bar Association (AFBA). She is also the Founder and Chairperson of Alzheimer’s Disease Foundation, Co-Founder and President of Women Foundation of Nigeria (WFN), and Founder and resident of Nkata Ndi Inyom Igbo (NNII).

== Public advocacy ==
Following her tenure as Minister of Women Affairs and Social Development, Josephine Anenih remained active in public advocacy, particularly on issues relating to women's political participation, electoral reform and gender equality.

She has argued that increasing the representation of women in elective and appointed offices requires legislative backing rather than relying solely on voluntary commitments by political parties.

Anenih has continued to encourage women to seek elective offices and has called for reforms that remove structural barriers limiting women's participation in governance.

She has also supported public health advocacy through the Alzheimer's Disease Foundation, promoting greater awareness of dementia and improved care for people living with Alzheimer's disease in Nigeria.

== Legal career and women's rights advocacy ==
Josephine Anenih is a lawyer and human rights activist. In a 2015 interview with Vanguard, she said that she was professionally a lawyer and described herself as a human rights activist. She also said that she operated a non-governmental organisation and identified the Convention on the Elimination of All Forms of Discrimination against Women (CEDAW) Bill as one of the issues that had motivated her political aspirations

Anenih also served as chair of the African Women Lawyers Forum of the African Bar Association. In an interview with Daily Trust, she discussed issues including discrimination against women, women's access to education and employment, and women's participation in political and social life. She identified education and public awareness as important ways of addressing violations of women's rights.

== Political career ==
Anenih became involved in Nigerian party politics and was the pioneer National Woman Leader of the People's Democratic Party (PDP). She later became a member of the party's Board of Trustees. Her political activities included advocacy for women's participation in politics and involvement in national political campaigns. In 2014, she participated in activities supporting President Goodluck Jonathan's bid for re-election and spoke about women's political participation and the role of women in national leadership.

In 2014, Anenih participated in a Transformation Ambassadors of Nigeria rally in Awka, where she called on the PDP to give President Goodluck Jonathan the party's ticket for the 2015 presidential election. She also described herself at the event as a Nigerian woman leader.

== Minister of Women Affairs ==
Anenih served as Minister of Women Affairs. In a 2017 interview, she said that during her time in the ministry she worked on issues including education, advocacy and women's empowerment, describing her role as building on work carried out by previous ministers.

As a former minister, Anenih continued to speak publicly about women's participation in politics and governance. In a 2021 speech reported by Vanguard, she called for greater participation of women in partisan politics and argued that more women should emerge as state governors and president.
