= Muhammed K. Abubakar =

Nigerian politician

Federal Minister of Science and Technology
- In office 6 April 2010 – 2014
- Preceded by: Alhassan Bako Zaku

Personal details
- Born: 19 October 1959 (age 66) Zuru, Kebbi State, Nigeria

Muhammed K. Abubakar (born 19 October 1959) was appointed Nigerian Minister of Science and Technology on 6 April 2010, when acting president Goodluck Jonathan announced his new cabinet.

Abubakar was born on 19 October 1959 at Zuru in Kebbi State. He studied biochemistry at Ahmadu Bello University, Zaria where he earned a B.Sc. in 1982 and an M.Sc. in 1989. In 1994 he earned a Ph.D. in biochemistry from the University of Essex in the United Kingdom. He has held administrative positions in government, and teaching positions at Usmanu Danfodiyo University.

After being inaugurated as Minister of Science and Technology on 6 April 2010, Abubakar said that his ministry would be concerned about translating scientific ideas into production.
