= Anthony Anenih =

Nigerian politician

Anthony Akhakon Anenih

Minister of Works and Housing
- In office 1999–2003
- Succeeded by: Isaiah Balat

Personal details
- Born: 4 August 1933 Uzenema-Arue, Uromi, Nigeria
- Died: 28 October 2018 (aged 85)
- Spouse: Josephine Anenih

Anthony Akhakon Anenih (4 August 1933 – 28 October 2018) was a Nigerian politician who served as Minister of Works and Housing from 1999 to 2003.

== Early life ==
Anenih was born in Uzenema-Arue, Uromi, in 1933. He joined the Nigeria Police Force in Benin City. Studying from home, he obtained secondary school qualifications. He attended the Police College in Ikeja, and was selected for further training at the Bramshill Police College, Basingstoke, England in 1966 and at the International Police Academy, Washington D.C. in 1970. He later served as a police orderly to the first Governor-General of Nigeria, Nnamdi Azikiwe. He worked as an instructor in various police colleges, and in 1975 was assigned to the Administrative Staff College (ASCON), Lagos. He retired from the Nigeria Police Force with the rank of commissioner of police.

== Early political career ==
Anenih was the state chairman of the National Party of Nigeria (NPN) between 1981 and 1983, during which he supported Samuel Ogbemudia's election as civilian governor of Bendel State. However, the governorship was cut short by the military takeover of December 1983. He was National Chairman of the Social Democratic Party from 1992 to 1993, during which he supported the election of Moshood Abiola as president. He was a member of the Constitutional Conference in 1994.

Anenih was a member of the Peoples Democratic Movement (PDM), United Nigeria Congress Party (UNCP) and Peoples Democratic Party (PDP). Anenih was said to have masterminded the 26 April 2002 declaration of President Obasanjo at the International Conference Center Abuja. He was deputy national coordinator of Olusegun Obasanjo's campaign organisation in the 1999 and 2003 elections.

== Minister of Works and Housing ==
Anenih was appointed Minister of Works and Housing in 1999. He subsequently became Chairman of the Board of Trustees of the PDP.

== Controversies ==
In October 2009, a Senate committee issued a report on their investigation into the use of more than ₦300 billion in the transport sector during the Obasanjo administration. The committee recommended prosecution of 13 former ministers, including Anenih, saying he had awarded contracts without budgetary provision. In November 2009, the Senate indefinitely shelved consideration of the report.

In October 2009, the Central Bank of Nigeria released a list of customers with major debt to five audited banks. It reported that, through Mettle Energy and Gas limited, Anenih and Osahon Asemota owed ₦2.06 billion. Anenih denied any involvement with Mettle Energy and Gas Limited, and stated that he had written to the Economic and Financial Crimes Commission (EFCC) chairman, Farida Waziri, urging an investigation into the matter.

== Personal life ==
Anenih was married to Josephine Anenih, a lawyer, who served as chairperson of the Federation of Women Lawyers from 1994 to 2000. She was appointed Minister of Women Affairs on 6 April 2010, when Acting President Goodluck Jonathan announced his cabinet.

== Death ==
Anenih died on 28 October 2018 at the age of 85, and was buried in his hometown in Uromi. His burial was attended by many influential people in the country. Until his death, he was the Iyasele of Esanland.
