= Musa Mohammed Sada =

Nigerian politician

Federal Minister of Mines & Steel Development
- In office 6 April 2010 – 29 May 2015
- Preceded by: Diezani Allison-Madueke
- Succeeded by: Kayode Fayemi

Personal details
- Born: 25 February 1957 (age 69) Mani, Katsina State, Nigeria
- Party: People's Democratic Party

Architect Musa Mohammed Sada (born 25 February 1957) was appointed Nigerian Minister of Mines & Steel Development on 6 April 2010, when Acting President Goodluck Jonathan announced his new cabinet.

Sada was born on February 25, 1957, in Mani, Katsina State. He attended Ahmadu Bello University (ABU), Zaria and gained a B.SC in 1982 and M.Sc in Architecture in 1984. He earned an MBA from ABU in 1998. He practiced as a professional architect until being appointed Commissioner of Works, Housing and Transportation for Katsina State in 2007.
