= Ramatu Tijani Aliyu =

Nigerian politician

Ramatu Tijjani Aliyu

Minister of State for Federal Capital Territory (FCT)
- In office 21 August 2019 – 29 May 2023

President Council of African Political Parties

Former Women Leader APC
- In office 2014–2018

Personal details
- Born: 12 June 1970 (age 56) Kogi State, Nigeria
- Party: All Progressive Congress (APC)
- Spouse: Alhaji Tijjani Aliyu (Sardaunan Budon)
- Education: Ahmadu Bello University, Nasarawa State University, Commonwealth University, London.
- Occupation: Business, Politician
- Profession: Urban Planner, Politician

Ramatu Tijani Aliyu // (née Sidi Ali; born 12 June 1970) is a Nigerian politician who served as the Minister of State for the Federal Capital Territory (FCT) from August 21, 2019 to May 29, 2023.She was appointed by President Muhammadu Buhari on 21 August 2019 and served until 29 May 2023. Ramatu was previously the national woman leader of the All Nigeria Peoples Party (ANPP), later the All Progressive Congress (APC), after the party and other political parties merged (2014-2018).

She supported Muhammadu Buhari during his presidential campaigns, where she criticised the opposition candidate in the 2019 election, Alhaji Atiku Abubakar, for not bringing anything important to the development of the country while he was the vice president of Nigeria and called on Nigerians not to expect anything from him as he has nothing to offer again. She was elected president of the Council of African Political Parties, serving from 2015 to 2017.

== Early life and education ==
Aliyu was born on 12 June 1970 in Wuse, Abuja, Nigeria. She is the daughter of Alhaji Mamman Sidi Ali, who was the Bawan Allah of Lokoja in Kogi State, Nigeria, a royal title he held until his death. Ramatu started her early childhood education at Dawaki Primary School, Suleja, in 1976. In 1982, she enrolled at Federal Government College (FGC) Minna, Niger State, where she completed her secondary education in 1988. Two years later, after a successful completion of her remedial programme, Aliyu got admitted into Ahmadu Bello University, Zaria, for her undergraduate programme to study urban and regional planning, earning a Bachelor of Science degree (B.Sc.) in 1995. Aliyu completed her master's degree in public administration at Nasarawa State University, Keffi. She was conferred an honorary doctorate degree in public administration by the Commonwealth University, London, and also earned a certificate in leadership skills from the Abbey College, London.

== Career and politics ==
Aliyu first started her work life after she was mobilised for the compulsory National Youth Service Corps (NYSC) at the Federal Ministry of Works and Housing. She later joined AZAH Intermediaries Nigeria Limited, a civil engineering construction firm, where she worked as managing director for several years, but she later went back to university, where she got her master's degree and certificate in leadership skills and enrolled in a PhD programme.

In 2004, Aliyu was appointed special adviser on women affairs, youth and social development to the chairman of the Gwagwalada area council, Federal Capital Territory (FCT), Abuja, Nigeria. In 2007, she ran for political office to represent Kwali/Abaji federal constituency in the Nigeria National Assembly (NASS), but was unsuccessful. A year later, in 2008, she was appointed national vice chairman of the All Nigeria Peoples Party(ANPP), overseeing the north central zone. In 2010, she became the national women leader of the party and concurrently served as the president of the Council of African Political Parties (CAPP) after winning an election in Khartoum, Sudan.

Following the 2014 merger of three major opposition parties, including the ANPP, into the All Progressives Congress (APC), Aliyu was appointed the women leader of the new party, a position she held until 2018.

== Personal life ==
Aliyu is married to Alhaji Ahmed Tijjani Aliyu, a banker and philanthropist. Together they have three children. She runs an NGO and founded the Global Women and Youth Empowerment Strategy (GLOWYES).

An African Heroine Award 2025 was bestowed upon Dr. Ramatu Tijani Aliyu by The Voice Achievers Award, a prestigious Netherlands-based Pan-African organization.
