= Abubakar Iro Danmusa =

Nigerian politician

Iro Abubakar Danmusa (31 December 1935 – 14 August 2010) was a Nigerian politician and former minister of the Federal Capital Territory. He was prominent in the government of Shehu Shagari, serving as Minister of Social Development, Youth and Sports (1979–1981), Minister of State of Finance (1981), Minister of Aviation (1981–1982) and FCT Minister (1982–1983)

Born in Safana, Northern region of Nigeria, Danmusa obtained in General Certificate Education through self study and then proceeded to the Institute of Administration, Ahmadu Bello University. He started work in the civil service, beginning at Katsina Native Authority before transferring service to North Central State. His foray in politics began in 1977 when he became a member of the Constituent Assembly, thereafter he pitched his tent with the National Party of Nigeria in the 1979 elections. In 1982, he succeeded John Kadiya as FCT minister, at the time, two districts within the capital city's phase one plan were moving towards completion. During the regime, there was focus on developing infrastructure in the accelerated district later known as Garki, this district will accommodate the first civil service workers and construction workers. The other is the North-West district (Wuse) which was also nearing completion.

During the fourth republic, Danmusa was National Vice Chairman of the People's Democratic Party in 1999. In 2006, he was a member of the Board of Trustees of PDP and was campaign coordinator of the failed presidential bid of Gov Victor Attah.

He comes from a respectable family from the long line of the Abubakar Danmusa family also known as Yandakawa which its ancestors can be traced back to Mali. He is the 6th born out of 27 children. his father Alhaji Abubakar Danmusa was the king of the town, Danmusa in Katsina state who isn't actually from there but migrated with his family.
