= National Commission for Women (Nigeria) =

Nigerian organization for the welfare of women

The National Commission for Women (NCW) was a Nigerian organization established by the Federal Government of Nigeria in 1989, and charged with promoting the welfare of women in Nigeria. The NCW was a predecessor of the Federal Ministry of Women Affairs and Youth Development.

== History ==
Responding to the demands of Nigerian women's organizations, in 1988 the federal government announced plans to establish a National Commission on Women and Development. The venue chosen for the announcement was the inaugural Better Life Fair, held in Lagos in 1988. The new Commission was thereby symbolically associated with the activity of the First Lady of Nigeria, Maryam Babangida, who had launched the Better Life for Rural Women Programme (BLP) in 1987.

The commission was formally established by the National Commission for Women Act, military decree number 30 in 1989. Its objectives were declared as follows:

1. To promote the welfare of women in general.

2. to promote the full utilization of women in the development of human resources.

3. To bring about the acceptance of women as full participants in every sphere of national development, with equal rights and corresponding duties.

4. To eliminate totally social and cultural practices tending to discriminate against and dehumanize womanhood.

The campaigner and academic Bolanle Awe was appointed as the first NCW chairperson, serving from 1990 to 1992. However, there was competition between the NCW and the BLP. Maryam Babangida wanted control of the NCW and exerted pressure against Awe, even seeing Awe arrested in 1992. In August 1992 President Babangida issued a decree (no. 42) which restructured the commission, putting it under the control of the First Lady's office.
