= Alhassan Bako Zaku =

Nigerian politician

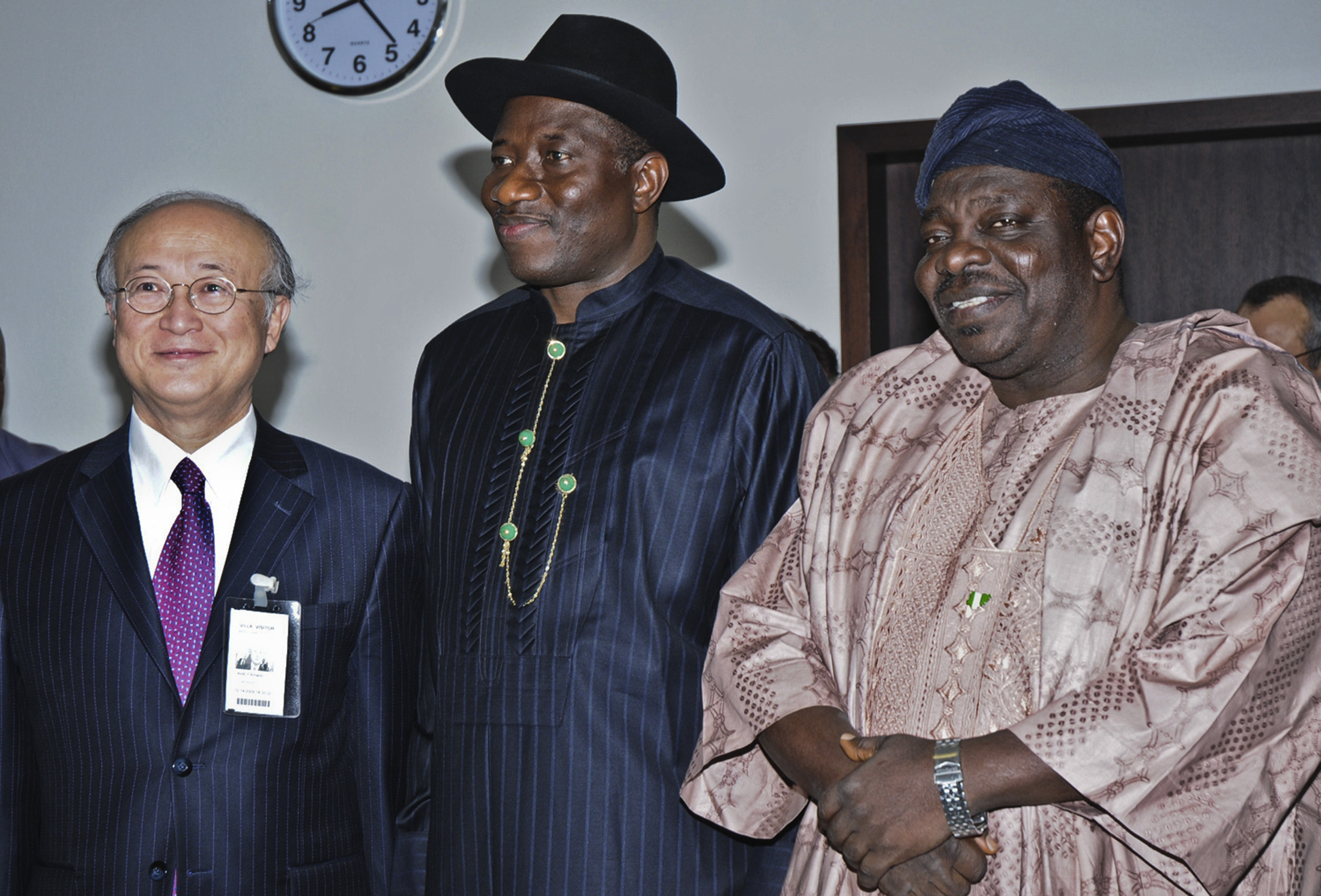
- Vice President Goodluck Jonathan (m), Alhassan Zaku (r) and Director General, International Atomic Energy Agency, Yukiya Amano (l). Taken in 2008

Federal Minister of Science and Technology
- In office 17 December 2007 – 17 March 2010
- Preceded by: Grace Ekpiwhre
- Succeeded by: Muhammed K. Abubakar

Personal details
- Born: January 18, 1951; Ibi LGA, Taraba State, Nigeria
- Spouse: Zainab Zaku
- Children: Hadiza Zaku, Nafisah Zaku, Sadiq Zaku and Ismail Zaku

Alhassan Bako Zaku (born January 18, 1951) became Nigeria's Minister of Science and Technology in December 2007. He left office in March 2010 when acting president Goodluck Jonathan dissolved his cabinet.

== Background ==
Alhassan Bako Zaku was born in Dampar, Ibi Local Government Area of Taraba State. He attended Barewa College, Zaria (1965–1971) and Ahmadu Bello University, Zaria (1972 – 1979) where he obtained a B.sc (Ed) degree in 1976, and an M.Ed in 1979. In 1978, he joined the College of Education, Jalingo as a lecturer. He went to the University of Hull, England in 1981, obtaining a Doctorate in 1983 in Science and Technical Education..He returned to the College of Education, Jalingo and was made its provost in 1986.

Dr. Bako Zaku helped to establish the Adamawa State Polytechnic between 1991 and 1993, and was its first Rector. He moved to Taraba State to establish the State Polytechnic in Jalingo in 1993, where he became rector. He worked at the National Open University of Nigeria as Centre Manager, Yola Centre between (2001–2004), then returned to the College of Education, Jalingo as Chief Lecturer (2004–2005). He then returned to Taraba State Polytechnic, Wukari as rector from 2005 to May 2007.

== Political career ==
Alhassan Bako Zaku was appointed Secretary to the Taraba State Government in May 2007 by Governor Danbaba Danfulani Suntai, and was appointed Minister of State for Science and Technology in October 2007. Bako Zaku became Nigeria's Minister of Science and Technology in December 2008 after a reshuffle of President Umaru Yar'Adua's cabinet.
