= Diezani Alison-Madueke =

Nigerian politician (born 1960)

Diezani Agama
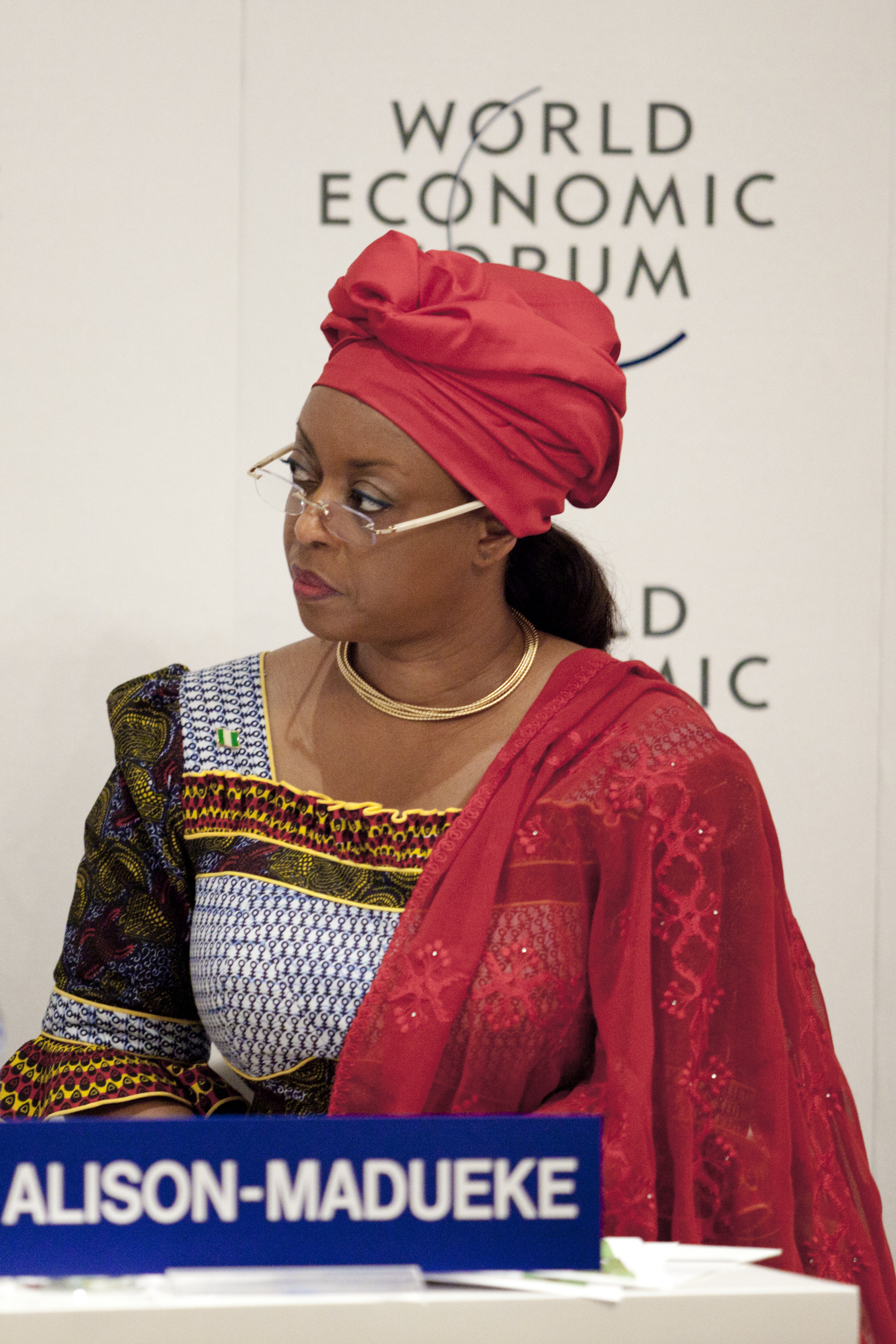
- Diezani Agama at the World Economic Forum on Africa in 2012

President of OPEC
- In office 27 November 2014 – 2 December 2015
- Preceded by: Abdourhman Atahar Al-Ahirish
- Succeeded by: Emmanuel Ibe Kachikwu

Federal Minister of Petroleum Resources
- In office 6 April 2010 – 28 May 2015
- President: Goodluck Jonathan
- Preceded by: Rilwanu Lukman
- Succeeded by: Muhammadu Buhari

Federal Minister of Mines & Steel Development
- In office 17 December 2008 – 17 March 2010
- President: Umaru Musa Yar'Adua
- Preceded by: Sarafa Tunji Ishola
- Succeeded by: Musa Mohammed Sada

Federal Minister of Transportation
- In office 26 July 2007 – 17 December 2008
- President: Umaru Musa Yar'Adua
- Preceded by: Precious Sekibo
- Succeeded by: Ibrahim Bio

Personal details
- Born: Diezani K. Agama; 6 December 1960 (age 65) Port Harcourt, Nigeria
- Spouse: Allison Madueke (m. 1999; div. 2022)
- Children: Ngozi (stepchild); Uju (stepchild); Ogonna (stepchild); Chimezie (son); Chima (stepchild)
- Parent(s): HRH, Chief Frederick Abiye Agama
- Education: Howard University; Cambridge University
- Profession: Politician; architect

Diezani K. Agama (born 6 December 1960) is a Nigerian politician who was the first female president of OPEC.

She became Nigeria's minister of transportation on 26 July 2007. She was moved to Mines and Steel Development in 2008, and in April 2010 was appointed as the first female Minister of Petroleum Resources in Nigeria. She was also elected the first female OPEC president at the 166th OPEC Ordinary meeting in Vienna on 27 November 2014.

== Early life and education ==
Diezani K. Agama was born in Port Harcourt, Rivers State, Nigeria. Her father was Chief Frederick Abiye Agama.

She had her early education in Shell camp and attended Hussey Model School after the Nigerian civil war. In 1968, she enrolled in Township School, Port Harcourt and then went on to Holy Rosary Government Girls Secondary School where she sat for her WASCE in 1975. She proceeded to Federal School of Arts and Sciences in Mubi, Gongola State (now Adamawa State) for her A' Levels and then moved to the United Kingdom in 1977 to study architecture.

While in the UK, she commenced studying architecture in England but then moved to Howard University in the United States. She graduated from Howard with a bachelor's degree on 8 December 1992. In 2002, she attended Cambridge Judge Business School for her MBA degree. She is a beneficiary of the Chevening scholarship.

== Career ==
=== Shell Nigeria ===
Alison-Madueke returned to Nigeria in 1992 and joined Shell Petroleum working in the estates area of operations in the Lagos office of Shell as well as acting as an architectural consultant. She rose to the position of Head of Civil Infrastructures and then became Head of Corporate Issues and Crisis Management Unit in 1997. Upon completion of her MBA program at Cambridge, she was made Lead Joint Ventures Representation Adviser in 2004.

Alison-Madueke was appointed as an executive director of Shell in 2006. She was the first woman ever to be appointed by Shell as an executive director in Nigeria.

=== In government ===
Alison-Madueke has held three significant positions in the Nigerian federal government. She was appointed Transportation Minister in July 2007. On 23 December 2008, she became the Minister of Mines and Steel Development. When Vice-president Goodluck Jonathan became acting president in February 2010, he dissolved the cabinet on 17 March 2010, and swore in a new cabinet on 6 April 2010 with Alison-Madueke as Minister for Petroleum Resources. Alison-Madueke left office on June 1, 2015, as part of the presidential transition to Jonathan's successor. She then went to work for the Commonwealth of Dominica as a Trade and Investment Commissioner.

==== Minister of Petroleum Resources ====
As Minister of Petroleum Resources, Alison-Madueke pledged to transform Nigeria's oil and gas industry.

In April 2010, President Goodluck Jonathan signed the Nigerian Content Act, which aimed to increase the percentage of petroleum industry contracts awarded to indigenous Nigerian businesses – a reaction to the domination of the sector by foreign operators.

One of the most controversial policies introduced under Alison-Madueke was the government's plan to remove state subsidies on fuel prices. Alison-Madueke supported the discontinuation of the subsidy "because it poses a huge financial burden on the government, disproportionately benefits the wealthy, [and] encourages inefficiency, corruption and diversion of scarce public resources away from investment in critical infrastructure."

=== Firsts ===
Alison-Madueke was the first woman to hold the position of Minister of Petroleum Resources in Nigeria, and in October 2010 she became the first woman to head a country delegation at the semi-annual OPEC conference. She was also the first female Minister of Transportation, and the first woman to be appointed to the board of Shell Petroleum Development Company Nigeria. On 27 November 2014, she was elected as the first female President of OPEC.

On working in male-dominated sectors, Alison-Madueke said she advised the young women she mentored while at Shell to "change their mode of thinking."

== Allegations of corruption and financial misconduct ==
A PBS NewsHour segment quoted American and British officials saying that former Petroleum Minister Diezani Alison-Madueke might personally have organized a diversion of $28 billion from the Nigerian treasury.

She has been charged with responsibility for $20 billion missing from the Petroleum Agency. A former Central Bank of Nigeria (CBN) governor, Sanusi, made the comment again during a PBS interview on 2 December 2015. Sanusi believes he was fired from the Central Bank of Nigeria because he went public with charges that $20 billion was missing from the Nigerian National Petroleum Corporation (NNPC) under Alison-Madueke's management. Alison Madueke says Sanusi made the allegations to retaliate after she didn't help him to get appointed as the president of the African Development Bank (AfDB) and dismissed his allegation.

She has been accused of awarding multi-billion Naira contracts without recourse to due process and of recklessly spending government funds as well as wasting billions of naira inappropriately on private jets.

In October 2009, the Senate of Nigeria indicted Diezani Alison-Madueke and recommended prosecution for the transfer of N1.2 billion naira into the private account of a toll company without due process and in breach of concession agreement.

She has been officially charged to court by the Economic and Financial Crimes Commission of Nigeria for 'Money Laundering'.

On 2 October 2015, Reuters reported that Alison-Madueke had been arrested by the UK's National Crime Agency (NCA) in London, along with four other people on suspicion of bribery and corruption offences. However, a spokesperson for the police denied having any knowledge of the incident. Her family and the Nigerian Government confirmed that she had been arrested in London, although the NCA declined to comment on the case.

Also in Nigeria, her home in Asokoro, Abuja was raided and sealed by anti-corruption agents of the Nigerian Economic and Financial Crimes Commission, a few hours after her alleged arrest in London.

On 28 August 2017, a Nigerian federal court seized 7.6 billion naira ($21 million) from bank accounts linked to Alison-Madueke.

In 2017, the US Justice Department's kleptocracy team seized $145 million worth of assets that had been purchased "for the benefit of" Ms. Alison-Madueke. Among the assets were a $50 million apartment in New York, properties in California, and an $80 million yacht; Galactica Star.

As part of the Pandora Papers leak in 2021, Alison-Madueke was accused of accepting $17 million in gifts and property from three Nigerian oil businessmen in exchange for favors as part of her role as Federal Minister of Petroleum Resources.

In October 2023, Alison-Madueke appeared in court in the UK to face trial for bribery charges, following her prior arrest in 2017. The EFCC also announced that they had secured an arrest warrant for Alison-Madueke on money laundering charges and were seeking her extradition.

On January 10, 2025, the US and Nigeria confirmed that the sum of $52.88m was being repatriated to Nigeria following the US Department of Justice's 2023 announcement of the final resolution of a duo of civil asset forfeiture cases against Alison-Madueke and her associates.

On 17 June 2026, a London jury at Southwark Crown Court acquitted Alison-Madueke of all six UK bribery-related charges after a corruption trial that lasted several weeks.

== Personal life ==
In 1999, Diezani married Allison Madueke, one-time Chief of Naval Staff who was at various times governor of Imo and Anambra States. She is mother to six children; one biological son and five step children including Chimezie Madueke and Ogonna Madueke. In September 2011, Alison-Madueke was awarded an honorary Doctorate degree in Management Sciences by the Nigerian Defence Academy, Kaduna. She is the first woman to be so awarded. The event took place at the convocation ceremony for the 58th Regular Course Cadet.

Alison-Madueke revealed that while in office, she had been undergoing treatments for breast cancer in the United Kingdom.

In September 2008, there was an unsuccessful attempt to kidnap Alison-Madueke at her house in Abuja along with her son Chimezie Madueke.

In June 2024, it was widely reported that Diezani had separated from Madueke as far back as 2021.

== See also ==
- List of people from Port Harcourt
- List of Nigerians
