= Ibrahim Bio =

Nigerian politician

Federal Minister of Transportation
- In office 17 December 2008 – 17 March 2010
- Preceded by: Diezani Allison-Madueke
- Succeeded by: Yusuf Sulaiman

Minister for National Sports Commission
- Incumbent
- Assumed office 6 April 2010
- Preceded by: Sani Ndanusa

Personal details
- Born: April 1957 (age 69) Baruten LGA, Kwara State, Nigeria

Ibrahim Isa Bio (born April 1957) was appointed by President Umaru Yar'Adua as Nigeria's Minister of Transportation on 17 December 2008. After Vice-President Goodluck Jonathan became acting President in February 2010, he dissolved the cabinet on 17 March 2010, and swore in a new cabinet on 6 April 2010 with Ibrahim Bio as Minister for the National Sports Commission.

== Background ==
Ibrahim Isa Bio was born in April 1957 in Baruten Local Government Area, Kwara State. He obtained a Pharmacy degree from Ahmadu Bello University, Zaria and an MBA from Ogun State University. Ibrahim Bio was Kwara State commissioner for Health (1990–1992).

Ibrahim Bio was elected to the Nigerian House of Representatives in April 1999 on the All People's Party (APP) platform for the Baruten / Kaiama (Kwara State) constituency, and was vice chairman of its committee on the environment. Before the 2003 elections, he transferred allegiance to the People's Democratic Party (PDP). He was elected on that platform to the Kwara State House of Assembly, where he was appointed Speaker.

Ibrahim Bio's daughter, Jamila Bio Ibrahim, is currently Nigeria's Minister of Youth, having been appointed the position by President Bola Tinubu in September 2023.

== Minister of Transportation ==
Ibrahim Isa Bio was appointed Minister of Transportation on 17 December 2008, replacing Diezani Allison-Madueke, who had been transferred to head the ministry of Mines and Steel Development.
