= Halima Tayo Alao =

Nigerian architect and politician (born 1956)

Minister of Environment and Housing
- In office 26 July 2007 – 29 October 2008
- Preceded by: Helen Esuene
- Succeeded by: John Odey

Personal details
- Born: 6 December 1956 (age 69)
- Education: Oxford University Business School Ahmadu Bello University (B.Sc. Hons, M.Sc.) University of Ilorin (M.Sc.)
- Profession: Architect

audio

Halima Tayo Alao (born 6 December 1956) is a Nigerian architect and former Minister of Environment and Housing during President Umaru Yar'Adua's administration.

== Early life and education ==
Halima Tayo Alao was born on 6, December 1956. She had her primary and post primary education in Kano state and earned a B.Sc. (Hons) and M.Sc. (Architecture) from the Ahmadu Bello University, Zaria in 1981 as well as a master's degree in public administration in 2003 from the University of Ilorin. She attended the Advanced Management and Leadership Programme of Oxford University Business School and is a member of the Nigerian Institute of Architects.

== Career ==
Alao joined the Kwara State civil service in 1982. She became a Permanent Secretary in the Kwara State ministries of Lands & Housing, then Works and Transport. Prior, she was sole administrator/Chairman Ilorin South Local government and Executive Secretary, Kwara State Commission for Women. From June 2005 to June 2006, she was Federal Minister of State for Education and later, Federal Minister of State for Health.

She was appointed to the board of the UACN Property Development Company Plc on 13 January 2010 as a non-executive director. She resigned from the board in 2019

=== Minister of Environment and Housing ===
Alao was appointed Minister of Environment and Housing on 26 July 2007 by President Umaru Yar'Adua. but was dismissed in a major cabinet reshuffle on October 29, 2008. The dismissal was said to have been due to her constant arguments with Chuka Odom, minister of state and representative of the Progressive Peoples Alliance. Her replacement was John Odey, appointed on 17, December 2008.

=== Former Minister Leaves Board of UACN Property ===
After serving on the board of UACN Property Development Company Plc for over nine years, Mrs Halima Alao, a former Minister of Environment, Housing and Urban Development, has called it quit with the company. Mrs. Alao, an Architect of high reputation in Nigeria, tendered her resignation to the board, which has been accepted. She joined the board on January 13, 2010, as a non-executive director.

Tayo Alao is currently the Director of Tham Girl-Child Foundation and a Member of The Nigerian Institute of Architects.
