= John Odey =

Nigerian politician

John Ogar Odey

Federal Minister of Environment
- In office 17 December 2008 – 29 May 2011
- Preceded by: Halima Tayo Alao
- Succeeded by: Amina Mohammed

Federal Minister of Information and Communications
- In office 26 July 2007 – 17 December 2008
- Preceded by: Frank Nweke
- Succeeded by: Dora Akunyili

Commissioner for Agriculture, Cross River State
- In office 2003–2005

Personal details
- Born: 1 November 1959
- Died: 7 October 2018 (aged 58) Dubai, United Arab Emirates
- Party: PDP
- Children: 4
- Education: University of Calabar
- Occupation: Politician

John Ogar Odey (1 November 1959 – 7 October 2018) was a Nigerian politician who served as Minister of Information and Communications in July 2007 and became Minister for Environment in December 2008 after President Umaru Yar'Adua reshuffled his cabinet. He was a Cross River State Commissioner for Agriculture between 2003 to 2005 and a former State Treasurer of the PDP.

== Biography ==
Odey graduated with a B.Sc. in banking and finance from the University of Calabar in 1986. He was active within the media, with positions such as General Manager for South-South Communication and Board Chairman of News Agency of Nigeria. He was appointed National Publicity Secretary of the Peoples Democratic Party (PDP) in 2004.

He served as Minister of Information and Communications and then as Minister for the Environment in the cabinet of Umaru Yar'Adua. In March 2010, he handed over to the Permanent Secretary for the Ministry of Environment after Vice President Goodluck Jonathan dissolved his cabinet. He retained his environmental portfolio when Jonathan reconstituted the cabinet in April 2010.

== Death ==
Odey died on Sunday, 7 October 2018, in Dubai, United Arab Emirates, after a cancer-related illness that made him travel out of the country for medical treatment.

== Burial ==
Odey's remains were taken home on Tuesday, 6 November 2018, for burial in his hometown, Okpoma, Yala Local Government Area of Cross River State, amid tears and testimonies. The body arrived at about 5 pm, and was taken to the Christ the King Catholic Church in Okpoma for Mass in his honour. He was buried in Okpoma on Wednesday, 7 November 2018.
