= Cabinet of President Olusegun Obasanjo =

Olusegun Obasanjo's leadership and cabinet in Nigeria

- Cabinet of Nigeria
- Date established: 29 May 1999
- Date dissolved: 29 May 2007

Leadership and composition
- Head of state: Olusegun Obasanjo
- Head of government: Olusegun Obasanjo

Formation and history
- Predecessor: Government of General Abdulsalami Abubakar
- Successor: Cabinet of President Umaru Yar'Adua

The Cabinet of President Olusegun Obasanjo was formed after President Olusegun Obasanjo took office in May 1999 after the return to democracy with the Nigerian Fourth Republic. Obasanjo made frequent changes to his cabinet of Federal Ministers and Ministers of State during his two terms of office, and periodically split or combined ministries. He made a major cabinet reshuffle in June 2000, and in January 2001 dissolved his cabinet. In December 2004 he named 12 new ministers. in June 2005 he made another major cabinet reshuffle. On 10 January 2007 a few months before leaving office he made yet another drastic overhaul.

== See also ==
- Cabinet of Nigeria
