= John Kadiya =

Nigerian politician

John Jatau Kadiya was a Nigerian politician, administrator and former minister. He was a senatorial candidate for the Plateau North senatorial election in 1979, and the gubernatorial candidate in the Plateau State elections of 1983, representing the National Party of Nigeria. He was a minister for aviation and the minister for the federal capital territory between 1979 and 1983. He was detained under the Administration of General Buhari in 1984 and was not released until 1985, when a new government was in place. He is from Plateau State.

He was a prominent figure during the Shehu Shagari regime. John Kadiya died on January 5, 1997.
