= Cabinet of Bola Tinubu =

Members of President Bola Tinubu's Cabinet

Tinubu Cabinet
- Cabinet of Nigeria
- 2023–present
- Date formed: 16 August 2023

People and organisations
- President: Bola Tinubu
- President's history: Former Lagos State Governor (1999–2007); Former Nigerian Senator for Lagos West (1992–1993)
- Vice President: Kashim Shettima
- Total no. of members: 52 (incl. Cabinet-level members)
- Member party: All Progressives Congress
- Status in legislature: Majority government (2023–present)
- Opposition party: Peoples Democratic Party

History
- Election: 2023 Nigerian presidential election
- Legislature term: 10th Nigeria National Assembly
- Budget: 2023 Nigerian federal budget
- Advice and consent: Nigerian Senate
- Predecessor: Cabinet of Muhammadu Buhari

Bola Tinubu assumed office as President of Nigeria on 29 May 2023. The president has the authority to nominate members of his Cabinet to the Nigerian Senate for confirmation. Ministers were nominated in July, and confirmed by the senate in August 2023.

== Cabinet of Nigeria ==
Portfolio	Minister	Took office	Left office	Party
The Presidency
President	Bola Tinubu (Note: Serves as President and Minister of Petroleum Resources concurrently.)	29 May 2023	Incumbent	APC
Vice President	Kashim Shettima	29 May 2023	Incumbent	APC
Chief of Staff to the President	Femi Gbajabiamila	14 June 2023	Incumbent	APC
Secretary to the Government of the Federation	George Akume	7 June 2023	Incumbent	APC
Ministry of Agriculture
Minister of Agriculture and Food Security	Abubakar Kyari	21 August 2023	Incumbent	APC
Minister of State for Agriculture and Food Security	Aliyu Sabi Abdullahi	21 August 2023	Incumbent	APC
Ministry of Art, Culture and the Creative Economy
Minister of Art, Culture and the Creative Economy	Hannatu Musawa	21 August 2023	Incumbent	APC
Ministry of Aviation and Aerospace Development
Minister of Aviation and Aerospace Development	Festus Keyamo	21 August 2023	Incumbent	APC
Ministry of Budget and Economic Planning
Minister of Budget and Economic Planning	Abubakar Atiku Bagudu	21 August 2023	Incumbent	APC
Ministry of Communications, Innovation and Digital Economy
Minister of Communications, Innovation and Digital Economy	Bosun Tijani	21 August 2023	Incumbent	N/A
Ministry of Defence
Minister of Defence	Mohammed Badaru Abubakar	21 August 2023	Incumbent	APC
Minister of State for Defence	Bello Matawalle	21 August 2023	Incumbent	APC
Ministry of Education
Minister of Education	Tahir Mamman	21 August 2023	Incumbent	APC
Minister of State for Education	Yusuf Sununu	21 August 2023	Incumbent	APC
Ministry of Environment
Minister of Environment	Balarabe Abbas Lawal	9 October 2023	Incumbent	APC
Minister of State for Environment	Iziaq Adekunle Salako	21 August 2023	Incumbent	APC
Federal Capital Territory Administration
Minister of the Federal Capital Territory	Nyesom Wike	21 August 2023	Incumbent	Peoples Democratic Party
Minister of State for the Federal Capital Territory	Mariya Mahmoud Bunkure	21 August 2023	Incumbent	APC
Ministry of Finance
Minister of Finance and Coordinating Minister of the Economy	Taiwo Oyedele	21 April 2026	Incumbent	N/A
Ministry of Foreign Affairs
Minister of Foreign Affairs	Yusuf Tuggar	21 August 2023	Incumbent	APC
Minister of State for Foreign Affairs	Bianca Odumegwu-Ojukwu	November 2024	Incumbent	All Progressives Grand Alliance
Ministry of Health and Social Welfare
Coordinating Minister of Health and Social Welfare	Muhammad Ali Pate	21 August 2023	Incumbent	APC
Minister of State for Health and Social Welfare	Tunji Alausa	21 August 2023	Incumbent	N/A
Ministry of Housing and Urban Development
Minister of Housing and Urban Development	Ahmed Musa Dangiwa	21 August 2023	Incumbent	N/A
Minister of State for Housing and Urban Development	Abdullahi Tijjani Gwarzo	21 August 2023	Incumbent	APC
Ministry of Humanitarian Affairs and Poverty Alleviation
Minister of Humanitarian Affairs and Poverty Alleviation	Betta Edu	21 August 2023	On suspension since 8 January 2024	APC
Ministry of Industry, Trade and Investment
Minister of Industry, Trade and Investment	Doris Anite	21 August 2023	Incumbent	N/A
Ministry of Information and National Orientation
Minister of Information and National Orientation	Mohammed Idris Malagi	21 August 2023	Incumbent	APC
Ministry of Innovation, Science and Technology
Minister of Innovation, Science and Technology	Uche Nnaji	21 August 2023	Incumbent	APC
Ministry of Interior
Minister of Interior	Olubunmi Tunji-Ojo	21 August 2023	Incumbent	APC
Ministry of Justice
Minister of Justice and Attorney General of the Federation	Lateef Fagbemi	21 August 2023	Incumbent	APC
Ministry of Labour and Employment
Minister of Labour and Employment	Simon Lalong	21 August 2023	20 December 2023	APC
Minister of State for Labour and Employment	Nkiruka Onyejeocha	21 August 2023	Incumbent	APC
Ministry of Marine and Blue Economy
Minister of Marine and Blue Economy	Gboyega Oyetola	21 August 2023	Incumbent	APC
Ministry of Niger Delta Development
Minister of Niger Delta Development	Abubakar Momoh	21 August 2023	Incumbent	APC
Ministry of Petroleum Resources
Minister of Petroleum Resources	Bola Tinubu	21 August 2023	Incumbent	APC
Minister of State for Petroleum Resources (Oil)	Heineken Lokpobiri	21 August 2023	Incumbent	APC
Minister of State for Petroleum Resources (Gas)	Ekperikpe Ekpo	21 August 2023	Incumbent	APC
Ministry of Police Affairs
Minister of Police Affairs	Ibrahim Geidam	21 August 2023	Incumbent	APC
Minister of State for Police Affairs	Imaan Sulaiman-Ibrahim	21 August 2023	Incumbent	APC
Ministry of Power
Minister of Power	Adebayo Adelabu	21 August 2023	Incumbent	APC
Ministry of Solid Minerals Development
Minister of Solid Minerals Development	Dele Alake	21 August 2023	Incumbent	APC
Ministry of Special Duties and Inter-governmental Affairs
Minister of Special Duties and Inter-governmental Affairs	Zephaniah Jisalo	21 August 2023	Incumbent	APC
Ministry of Sports Development
Minister of Sports Development	John Enoh	21 August 2023	Incumbent	APC
Ministry of Steel Development
Minister of Steel Development	Shuaibu Audu	21 August 2023	Incumbent	APC
Minister of State for Steel Development	Uba Maigari Ahmadu	21 August 2023	Incumbent	APC
Ministry of Tourism
Minister of Tourism	Lola Ade-John	21 August 2023	Incumbent	APC
Ministry of Transportation
Minister of Transportation	Sa'idu Ahmed Alkali	21 August 2023	Incumbent	APC
Ministry of Water Resources and Sanitation
Minister of Water Resources and Sanitation	Joseph Utsev	21 August 2023	Incumbent	APC
Minister of State for Water Resources and Sanitation	Bello Muhammad Goronyo	21 August 2023	Incumbent	APC
Ministry of Women Affairs
Minister of Women Affairs	Imaan Sulaiman-Ibrahim	21 August 2023	Incumbent	APC
Ministry of Works
Minister of Works	Dave Umahi	21 August 2023	Incumbent	APC
Ministry of Youth
Minister of Youth	Jamila Bio Ibrahim	9 October 2023	Incumbent	APC
Minister of State for Youth	Ayodele Olawande	9 October 2023	Incumbent	APC
Minister of Livestock Development	TBD	TBD	TBD	

== See also ==
- Cabinet of Nigeria
- Federal government of Nigeria
