= Nura Abba Rimi =

Nigerian diplomat and public servant (born 1968)

His Excellency Ambassador Nura Abba Rimi
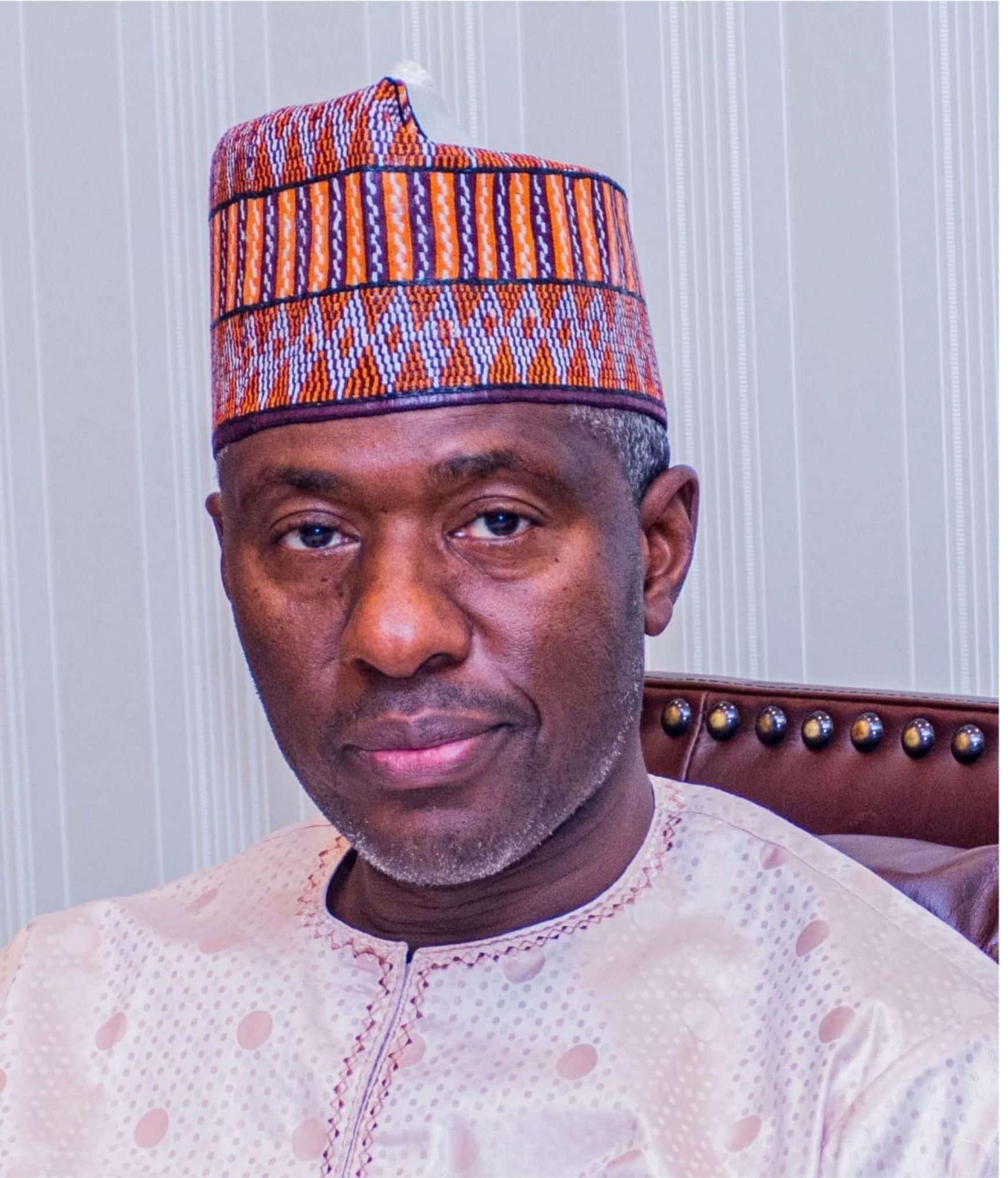

Permanent Secretary of the Federal Ministry of Steel Development
- Incumbent
- Assumed office 13 March 2026
- President: Bola Tinubu
- Minister: Shuaibu Audu
- Preceded by: Dr. Chris Osa Isokpunwu

Permanent Secretary of the Federal Ministry of Industry, Trade and Investment
- In office 11 January 2024 – 12 March 2026
- President: Bola Tinubu
- Preceded by: Dr. Evelyn Ngige
- Succeeded by: Dr. Chris Osa Isokpunwu

Nigeria's Ambassador to the Arab Republic of Egypt, with concurrent accreditation to the State of Palestine and the State of Eritrea
- In office April 2021 – November 2023
- President: Muhammadu Buhari; Bola Tinubu

Director, Regions (Ministry of Foreign Affairs)
- In office February 2019 – April 2021
- President: Muhammadu Buhari

Acting Director, Asia and Pacific Division (Ministry of Foreign Affairs)
- In office November 2018 – February 2019
- President: Muhammadu Buhari

Minister (Economic Affairs, Trade and Investment), Embassy of the Federal Republic of Nigeria, Abu Dhabi, United Arab Emirates
- In office October 2017 – November 2018
- President: Muhammadu Buhari

Chargé d'affaires (ad interim) Embassy of the Federal Republic of Nigeria, Abu Dhabi, United Arab Emirates
- In office February 2016 – October 2017
- President: Muhammadu Buhari

Minister (Political Affairs) Embassy of the Federal Republic of Nigeria, Abu Dhabi, United Arab Emirates.
- In office October 2015 – February 2016
- President: Muhammadu Buhari

Presidential Liaison Officer (PLO) State Protocol, Presidential Villa, Abuja
- In office May 2015 – October 2015
- President: Muhammadu Buhari; Goodluck Jonathan

Assistant Director (Protocol), State Protocol, Presidential Villa, Abuja
- In office November 2010 – May 2015
- President: Goodluck Jonathan

Consul/Head of Chancery, Consulate General of Nigeria, New York City, United States of America
- In office March 2007 – October 2010
- President: Olusegun Obasanjo; Umaru Musa Yar'Adua

Personal details
- Born: 23 November 1968 (age 57) Rimi, North-Central State (now in Katsina State), Nigeria
- Parents: Abba Musa Rimi (father); Aishatu Uwani Rimi (mother)
- Education: Ahmadu Bello University (BSc); University of Birmingham (MSc)
- Occupation: Civil Servant
- Profession: Diplomat

Nura Abba Rimi (born 23 November 1968) is a Nigerian diplomat who currently serves as the Permanent Secretary, Federal Ministry of Steel Development. He was Ambassador of the Federal Republic of Nigeria to the Arab Republic of Egypt, with concurrent accreditation to the State of Palestine and the State of Eritrea.

Prior to his appointment as Ambassador, Rimi was a Senior Protocol Officer and Presidential Liaison Officer at the Presidential Villa in Abuja. He served as the Presidential Liaison Officer between President Goodluck Ebele Jonathan and President-Elect, Muhammadu Buhari, during the transition of power in 2015.

On 24 October 2023, Rimi was appointed Permanent Secretary in the Federal Civil Service by President Bola Tinubu."

== Early background ==
Nura Abba Rimi is from Rimi local government of Katsina State, North-West Nigeria.

He began his educational pursuit at Aya Primary School in Funtua, Nigeria, where he obtained his Primary School Leaving Certificate in 1979. He then proceeded to Sardauna Memorial College in Kaduna, Nigeria, where he obtained his General Certificate of Education (GCE) O/Level in 1984. In 1987, he attended the College of Advanced Studies in Zaria, Nigeria, where he sat for his Interim Joint Matriculation Board (IJMB) advanced level (A-Level) examination for placement into the university.

Rimi enrolled at Ahmadu Bello University in Zaria, Nigeria, where he graduated with honours in 1990 with a Bachelor of Science degree in International Studies. He later furthered his education at the University of Birmingham in the United Kingdom, where he obtained a Master of International Studies in 1992, majoring in Diplomacy.

Rimi's foundation in diplomacy and international relations culminated in his appointment into the Federal Civil Service as a Foreign Service Officer on 27 January 1993.

== Diplomatic career ==
Nura Abba Rimi has held various positions within the Nigerian Ministry of Foreign Affairs and represented Nigeria at several diplomatic postings and engagements both within Nigeria and abroad.

=== Tour of duty ===
From April 2021 to November 2023, Rimi served as the Ambassador of the Federal Republic of Nigeria to the Arab Republic of Egypt, with concurrent accreditation to the State of Palestine and the State of Eritrea. Prior to this, from February 2019 to April 2021, he served as the Director of the Regions of the World Department at the Ministry's Headquarters.

In November 2018, Rimi was appointed as the acting director of the Asia and Pacific Division (Headquarters), a position he held until February 2019. From October 2015 to November 2018, he served as the Minister (Economic Affairs, Trade and Investment); Minister, Political Affairs; and Chargé ďAffairés (ad interim) at the Embassy of the Federal Republic of Nigeria in Abu Dhabi, United Arab Emirates covering important hubs as Dubai, Sharjah and Abu Dhabi.

Rimi also served in various capacities in the Nigerian Presidential Villa. He was the Presidential Liaison Officer (PLO) to the President from May 2015 to October 2015, serving as the Presidential Liaison Officer between President Goodluck Ebele Jonathan and President-Elect, Muhammadu Buhari, during the transition of power in 2015. Before then, he was assistant director (Protocol) at, Presidential Villa, from November 2010 to May 2015, and Senior Protocol Officer, State Protocol, Presidential Villa, from January 2005 to March 2007.

He served in various diplomatic missions abroad, including as the Consul/Head of Chancery at the Consulate General of Nigeria in New York, USA from March 2007 to October 2010. He was also the First Secretary and Deputy Chief of Protocol at the Nigerian High Commission in London, UK, from June 1999 to April 2003.

Rimi's first diplomatic posting was as a Third Secretary at the Foreign Service Academy in Lagos, Nigeria, from April 1993 to March 1994. He also served as a Second Secretary in the Foreign Service Inspectorate (Headquarters) from July 1994 to June 1996 and as a Second Secretary, Middle East and Gulf Division (Headquarters) from June 1996 to June 1999.

== Ambassadorship to Egypt ==
During his ambassadorship, Nura Abba Rimi significantly strengthened the bilateral relations between Nigeria and Egypt in various fields, including trade, culture, and education.

Rimi also worked to promote Nigeria's image abroad and attract foreign investments to the country. He organized events and exhibitions that showcased Nigeria's rich heritage, diverse culture and investment opportunities to the people of Egypt. In collaboration with Nigeria-Egypt Cultural and Socio-Economic Forum (NECSEF) and the Egyptian African Businessmen's Association (EABA) the Embassy of Nigeria in Cairo, under his headship organized the maiden edition of the Nigeria–Egypt Trade Conference and Exhibition (NETCE) in October, 2022.

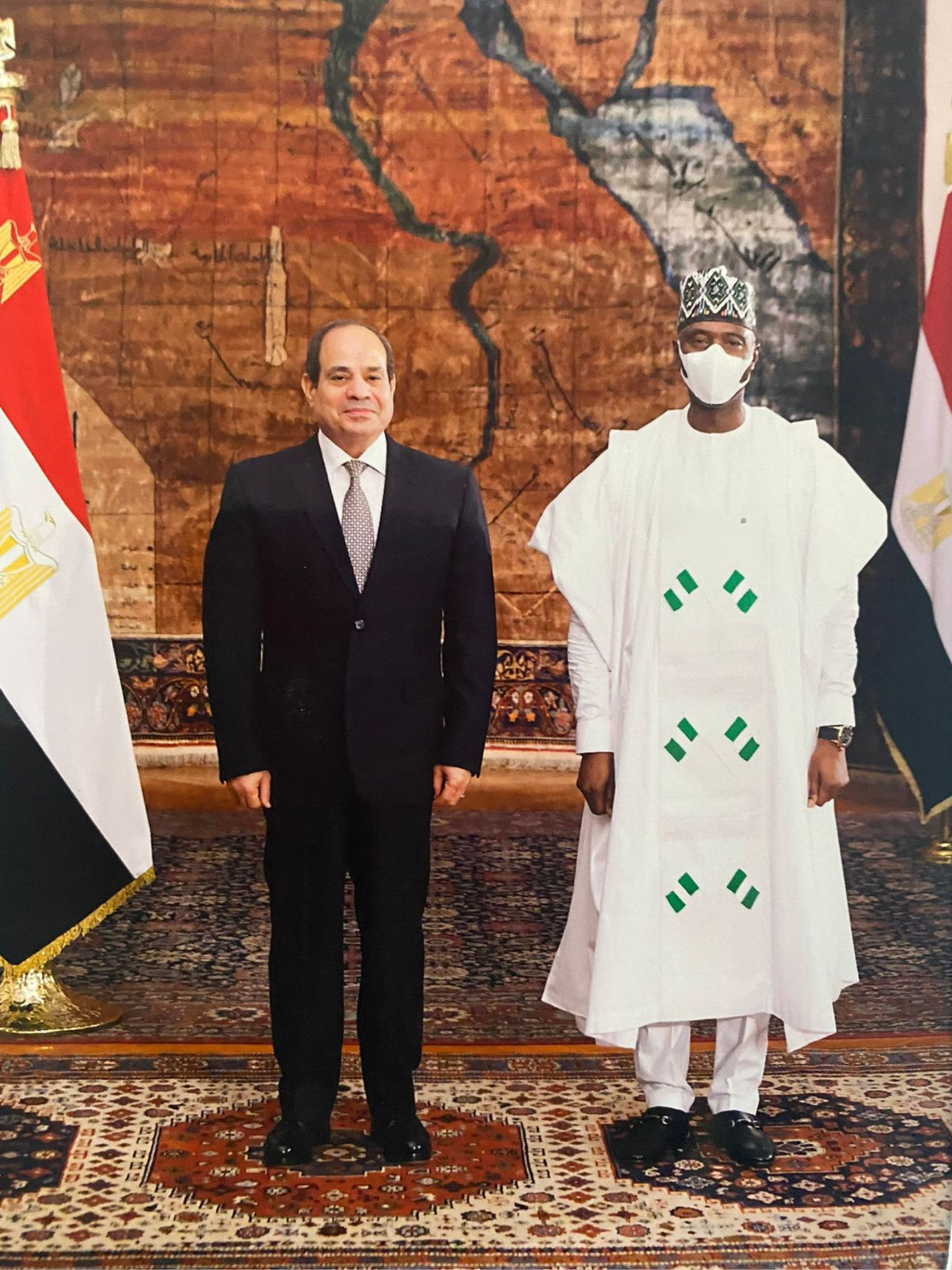
President Abdel Fattah Al Sisi of Egypt (left) and Ambassador Nura Abba Rimi, Nigeria's Ambassador to Egypt, during the presentation of Letter of Credence to President Abdel Fattah Al Sisi of Egypt on 15 September 2021 at the Al-Tahra Palace in Cairo.

== Permanent Secretary of the Federal Civil Service ==
On 24 November 2023, President Bola Tinubu approved the appointment of Nura Abba Rimi as one of eight new Permanent Secretaries in the Federal Civil Service following a nationwide selection process conducted by the Office of the Head of the Civil Service of the Federation. According to the Presidency, Rimi emerged among the successful candidates after what it described as a "diligent assessment process", and was expected to contribute to the implementation of the administration's Renewed Hope agenda through improved public service delivery.

Rimi officially assumed office as Permanent Secretary of the Federal Ministry of Industry, Trade and Investment on 17 January 2024. During the handover ceremony, he described the ministry as central to the Federal Government's economic reform programme, noting that a majority of the priorities contained in the administration's Eight-Point Agenda fell within the ministry's mandate. He called on the ministry's management and staff to work collaboratively in implementing policies aimed at industrial development, trade expansion, investment promotion and poverty reduction.

In March 2026, the Federal Government redeployed Rimi to serve as Permanent Secretary of the Federal Ministry of Steel Development, where he succeeded Christopher Osaruwanmwen Isokpunwu following an official handover ceremony in Abuja.

== Other national assignments ==
From 1997 to date, Nura Abba Rimi has been a delegate to multiple conferences and bilateral/multilateral forums on behalf of Nigeria. He was also a regular face on the Nigerian presidential entourage to different global summits, including the United Nations General Assembly.

Between 2019 and 2020, he served as commissioner representing Ministry of Foreign Affairs at the 3rd and 4th Board of National Hajj Commission of Nigeria (NAHCON).

On Monday, 27 November 2023, he was sworn in as Permanent Secretary by President Bola Ahmed Tinubu.

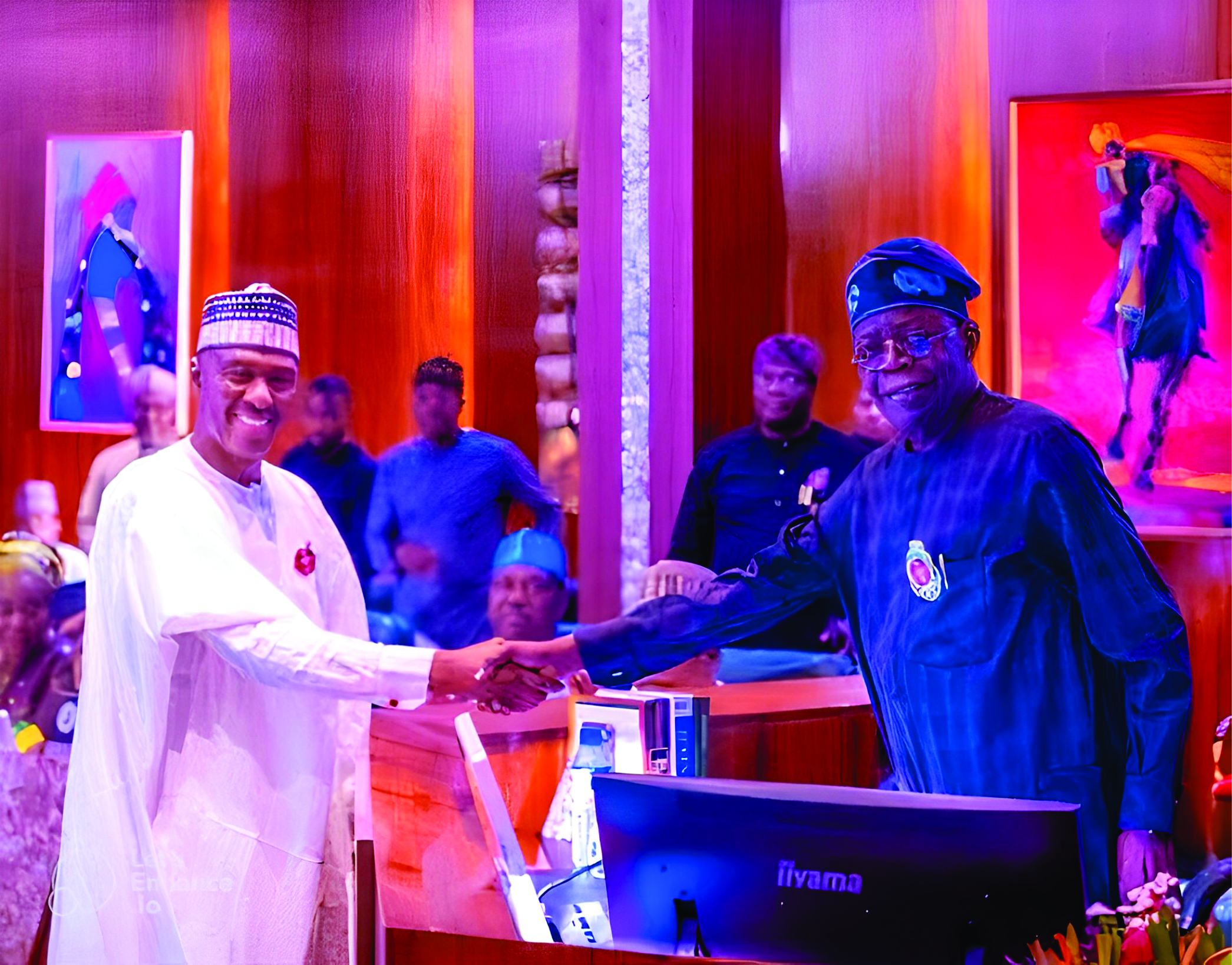

== Private life ==
Nura Abba Rimi was born into the family of Nigerian politician, Abba Musa Rimi and Aishatu Uwani Rimi. His father, Abba Musa Rimi, was Deputy Governor (1979–80), Acting Governor (1980–81), and Governor of Kaduna State (1981–1983).
