= The Nigerian Youth Parliament =

Training institution in Nigeria

Nigerian Youth Parliament
- 6th Assembly

Type
- Term limits: 1

Leadership
- Speaker of the Nigerian Youth Parliament: Rt.Hon. Aliyu Zakari Idris
- Deputy Speaker of the Nigerian Youth Parliament: Barr. Chisom Jane Ikechukwu

Structure
- Seats: 109
- Length of term: 2 years

The Nigerian Youth Parliament (NYP), founded in 2008 under the administration of Umaru Musa Yar’adua GCFR, is the body that oversees the activities of youths in Nigeria. By composition, it is a replica of the Red Chamber of the National Assembly, and as such, the Parliament is made up of 109 individuals representing all senatorial districts in Nigeria.

== History ==
The Nigerian Youth Parliament (NYP) is a legislative and developmental training institution created to strengthen, reinforce, and consolidate efforts to empower young people through meaningful youth representation in driving Nigeria’s developmental agenda.

The Nigerian Youth Parliament, which is under the tutelage of the National Assembly and funded by the Nigeria Federal Ministry of Youths and Sports Development, is a non partisan umbrella body for Nigerian youths created in compliance with the United Nations Charter on Youths Development and pursuant to the resolutions of the Commonwealth Heads of Government meeting in the Republic of Malta in 2005 as a platform through which their voices could be heard on government policies that directly affect them.

== Previous Speakers ==
Rt. Hon. Onofiok Luke is the pioneer Speaker of the Nigerian Youth Parliament who was served from 2007 to 2010.

Rt. Hon. Azeezat Yishawu, who served as the Speaker of the 5th Session, completed her tenure in November 2024. A new Assembly was then constituted and inaugurated on February 5, 2025, marking the emergence of Rt. Hon. Aliyu Idris Zakari as the Speaker of the 6th Session of the Nigerian Youth Parliament. Barr. Chisom Jane Ikechukwu was also elected Deputy Speaker of the 6th Session.
