= Sununu =

Sununu is a surname. Notable people with the surname include:

- Chris Sununu (born 1974), son of John H. Sununu and brother of John E. Sununu, governor of New Hampshire (2017–2025).
- John E. Sununu (born 1964), son of John H. Sununu and brother of Chris Sununu, U.S. representative (1997–2003) and U.S. senator (2003–2009)
- John H. Sununu (born 1939), governor of New Hampshire (1983–1989) and White House Chief of Staff for George H. W. Bush (1989–1991)
- Nancy Sununu (1939–2024), first lady of New Hampshire (1983–1989) and matriarch of the Sununu family
- Yusuf Sununu (born 1967), Nigerian politician
