= Federal Ministry of Water Resources (Nigeria) =

Nigerian government department that manages water resources

Federal ministry of water resources

Agency overview
- Formed: 1976
- Type: Government
- Headquarters: Abuja Nigeria
- Minister responsible: Joseph Utsev
- Website: https://fmino.gov.ng/tag/federal-ministry-of-water-resources-and-sanitation/

The Federal Ministry of Water Resources is a federal ministry in Nigeria that is responsible for the management of water supply, irrigation, freshwater, and aquaculture. The ministry was established in 1976 to oversee the eleven river basin development authorities in Nigeria.

== Appointment ==
The current minister of water resources and sanitation is Engineer Joseph Utsev. Which is appointed by president Bola Ahmed Tinubu in 2023.

And the current permanent secretary is Alhaji Aliyu Shehu shinkafi from zamfara state which is appointed by president Tinubu on the 19th of January 2024.

The former minister of water resources is Engr. Suleiman Hussaini Adamu FNSE, FAEng., who was appointed by President Muhammadu Buhari on 11 November 2015.

== Responsibilities ==
The Federal Ministry of Water Resources aims to provide sustainable access to safe and sufficient water to meet the cultural and socio-economic needs of all Nigerians, while enhancing public health, food security, and poverty reduction. The ministry also strives to maintain the integrity of the freshwater ecosystem of the nation.

The Federal Ministry of Water Resources and Sanitation is deeply concerned about the reported outbreak of cholera in some States of the Federation resulting in the death of 30 persons which attests to the severity of the situation.

== Parastatals ==
The ministry supervises the following river basin development authorities:

- Anambra-Imo River Basin Development Authority
- Benin-Owena River Basin Development Authority
- Chad Basin River Development Authority
- Cross-River River Basin Development Authority
- Hadejia Jama'are River Basin Development Authority
- Ogun-osun River Basin Development Authority
- Lower Benue River Basin Development Authority
- Lower Niger River Basin Development Authority
- Niger Delta River Basin Development Authority
- Upper Benue River Basin Development Authority
- Upper Niger River Basin Development Authority
- Sokoto-Rima River Basin Development Authority

== Departments ==
The ministry has the following departments:

- Dams and Reservoir Operations
- Finance and Accounts
- General Services
- Human Resource Management
- Hydrology
- Internal Audit
- Irrigation & Drainage
- Procurement
- Reform Co-ordination and Service Improvement
- River Basin Operations and Inspectorate
- Special Duties
- Water Quality Control & Sanitation
- Water Resources Planning and Technical Support Services
- Water Supply and PPP
