= Hadejia Jama'are River Basin Development Authority =

The Hadejia-Jama'are River Basin Development Authority (HJRBDA) is a governmental organization in Nigeria responsible for the management, development, and utilization of water resources within the Hadejia-Jama'are River Basin. The authority was established to oversee various projects and initiatives aimed at improving agricultural production, water supply, and overall socio-economic development in the region.

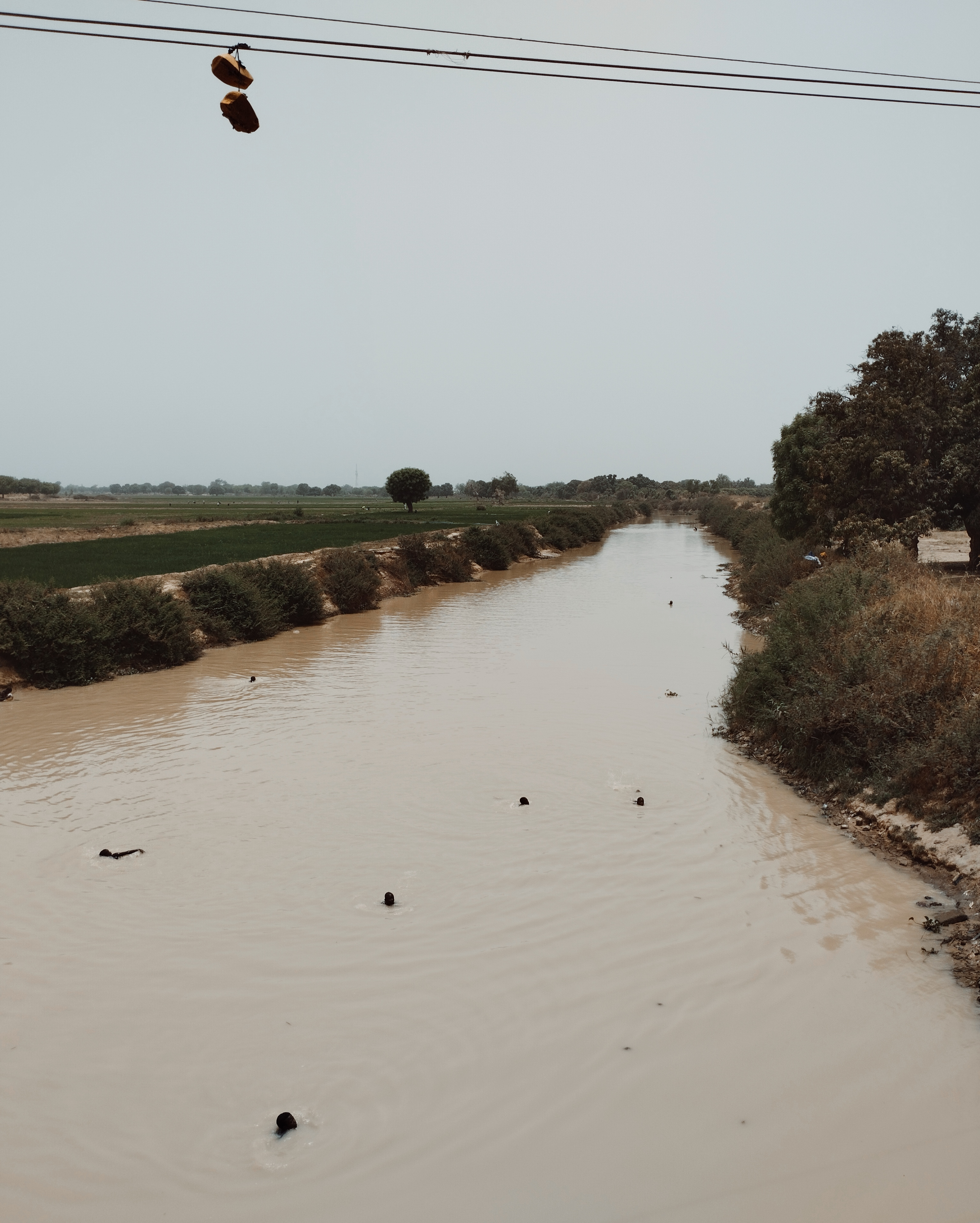
Hadejia River near Hadejia town.

The primary objectives of HJRBDA include water resource development for irrigation, flood control, and water supply, as well as promoting sustainable agriculture and rural development. The authority implements various projects such as building dams, constructing irrigation systems, and providing technical assistance to local communities to enhance water utilization for agricultural and other purposes.

HJRBDA plays a crucial role in coordinating water resource management, environmental conservation, and economic growth within the Hadejia-Jama'are River Basin, contributing to the livelihoods of the local population and the region's overall development.

== See also ==
- River Basin Authorities in Nigeria
- Niger Delta River Basin Development Authority
