= Ayodele Olawande =

Nigerian Minister For Youth Development

Minister for Youth Development
- Incumbent
- Assumed office 16 October 2023
- President: Bola Tinubu
- Preceded by: Jamila Bio Ibrahim

Personal details
- Born: 8 April 1989 (age 37) Ondo State, Nigeria
- Education: Federal Polytechnic, Ado-Ekiti
- Occupation: Entrepreneur, Politician
- Known for: UN Strategic Communication Officer

Ayodele Olawande Wisdom is a Nigerian politician. He is currently the Minister For Youth Development under the President Bola Tinubu Administration.

== Early life and education ==
Ayodele Olawande Wisdom hails from Ondo State, Southwest region. He completed his secondary school education in Ekiti State at Christ School and then proceeded to the Federal Polytechnic, Ado-Ekiti. He also studied Civil Engineering at the Federal University of Technology Akure

He proceeded to the University of Maiduguri, Borno State to study International Journalism.

He is also a member of the Commonwealth Society of Nigeria and was recently awarded a PhD (honoris causa) in leadership and development be Eminence University, Denver Colorado, (EUDC), USA.

== Politics ==
He served in the administration of President Muhammadu Buhari where he served as the Personal Assistant to the Special Adviser Innovation to the Vice President from 2019 to 2023.

On 16 October 2021, he was elected as the Ondo State APC Youth Leader and exactly two years after – 16 October 2023, he was sworn in as the Minister of State for Youth of the Federal Republic of Nigeria.

Before his appointment as the Minister of state for youth, He had already been nominated and was quizzed at the National assembly before he was confirmed as a minister of the Federal Republic of Nigeria by President Bola Ahmed Tinubu.

On 23 October 2024, he was reassigned as the Minister for Youth Development.

Other personal and political roles he held in the past include:

- Site Administrator/Engineer at Renz Nigeria Limited (2019–2022)
- Director of Business at TEHUB (2020)
- Director Operation at LAHHOMES (2020)
- Field Officer at IDP/NSIP NSIO (2020–2021)
- Former Southwest Co-coordinator. Asiwaju Grassroot Foundation (AGF)
- Deputy Director Presidential campaign Council Youth Southwest 2023
