= River Basin Authorities in Nigeria =

Nigerian government agencies for river management

River Basin Development Authorities in Nigeria are government agencies involved in the management of water resources for agriculture and other uses. Each authority operates in an assigned geo-morphological and political boundary and work to improve agriculture and rural development through irrigation, control of river pollution and also to assist farmers in processing food crops.

River basin authorities operations have been influenced by Nigeria's economic and political changes, ten years after they were established their impact has been minimal.

== Background ==
Concerns about sustainable food production in Nigeria after the Sahel drought of the early 1970s and a decline in agricultural output following Nigeria's oil boom led to ideas about investing in sustainable food production and managing water resources. Plans were then developed to create government agencies spread out within the country based on the drainage systems of various rivers. In 1973, two river basin authorities were established for Sokoto River and Lake Chad basin.

In 1976, the law establishing the River Basin Development Authorities listed eleven agencies with the mandate to develop water resources to boost agricultural productions. Water resource management to support irrigable crops was one of the crucial mandates of the river basin authorities.

When a democratic administration came into power in 1979, improved capital expenditure was allocated to the river basin authorities, some of which were in states controlled by the opposition but political consideration in choice of contractors and board personnel.

In 1984, new basin authorities were created for each state, an increase to 19 from the original eleven basins. However, this restructuring did not last as a new regime reverted to the previous eleven.

== The river basin authorities ==
- Chad Basin Development Authority - areas surrounding the Lake Chad Basin.
- Upper Benue River Basin Development Authority - areas drained by the Benue River and its tributaries from the international boundary to Pai and Donga River.
- Lower Benue River Basin Development Authority - catchment area are those within the confluence of Benue and Niger Rivers.
- Cross River Basin Development Authority - catchment area are places drained by the Cross River and tributaries.
- Anambra - Imo River Basin Development Authority - East of Niger River in areas drained by Rivers Imo and Anambra.
- Niger River Basin Development Authority - areas drained by the Niger River starting in the North from the river's confluence with Malendo River and down to Niger River's confluence with Ubo River.
- Ogun Osun River Basin Development Authority
- Benin - Owena River Basin Development Authority
- Niger Delta River Basin Development Authority
- Sokoto - Rima River Basin Development Authority
- Hadejia - Jama're River Basin Development Authority.
- Upper Niger River - Niger, Kaduna and FCT

== List Of Directors for all states' River Basin Authorities ==
- Anambra-Imo River Basin Development Authority

Michael Nwabufo - Managing Director Michael Nwachukwu - Director Engineering Nweze Obasi - Director Agricultural Services Benjamin Aneke - Director Planning and Design Ngozi Uche - Director Finance and Administration

- Benue-Owena River Basin Development Authority

Saliu Ahmed - Managing Director Modupe Olalemi - Director Engineering Agbetuyi Bamidele - Director Agricultural Services Olumese Charles - Director Planning and Design Akinya Folorunsho Samson - Director Finance and Administration

- 'Chad River Basin Development Authority

Abba Garba - Managing Director Babagana Uroma - Director Engineering Abdul Tashikalma - Director Agricultural Services Modu Surum - Director Planning and Design Falmata Maina Dalatu - Director Finance and Administration

- Cross River Basin Development Authority

Bassey Nkposong - Managing Director Esin Winston Mosembe - Director Engineering U.A. Essien - Director Agricultural Services I.I. Udoh - Director Planning and Design Okpata Egbe - Director Finance and Administration

- Hadejia-Jema'are River Basin Development Authority

Ado Khalid Abdullahi - Managing Director Abubakar Mohammed - Director Engineering Ma’amun Da’u Aliyu - Director Agricultural Services Mohammed Umar Kura - Director Planning and Design Mohammed Awwal Wada - Director Finance and Administration

- Lower Benue River Basin Development Authority

Mahmoud Adra - Managing Director Mathias Udoyi - Director Engineering Samuel Ochai - Director Agricultural Services Emmanuel Yepwi - Director Planning and Design Richard Ndidi - Director Finance and Administration

- Lower Niger River Basin Development Authority

Adeniyi Saheed Aremu - Managing Director Abdulkarim Mohammed Bello - Director Engineering Tajuddeen Affinih - Director Agricultural Services Olawale Victor - Director Planning and Design Abu Atsumbe Abdullahi - Director Finance and Administration

- Niger Delta River Basin Development Authority

Tonye David-West - Managing Director Okwonu Benson - Director Engineering Ikuromo Joshua - Director Agricultural Services Austen Pabor - Director Planning and Design Isaac Akpoede Otuorimo - Director Finance and Administration

- Ogun-Osun River Basin Development Authority

Olatunji Babalola - Managing Director Iyiola Rufus - Director Engineering Bolanle Olaniyan - Director Agricultural Services Adesanya Mutiu Omoniyi - Director Planning and Design Olayiwola Baruwa - Director Finance and Administration

- Sokoto-Rima River Basin Development Authority

Olayiwola A. Baruwa - Managing Director Jafar Sadeeq - Director Engineering Sanusi Mai-Afu - Director Agricultural Services Murtala Dalhatu - Director Planning and Design Faruk Madugu Gwandu - Director Finance and Administration

- Upper Benue River Basin Development Authority

Abubakar Muazu - Managing Director Mukhtar Umar Isa - Director Engineering Abdulhameed Girei - Director Agricultural Services Yusuf Daniel Ajemasu - Director Planning and Design Haruna Musa - Director Finance and Administration

- Upper Niger River Basin Development Authority

Abdulkarim Ali - Managing Director David Emmanuel - Director Engineering Abdu Aminu Omar - Director Agricultural Services John Bature Gimba - Director Planning and Design Alhassan Bawa Ugbada - Director Finance and Administration
