= Jamila Bio Ibrahim =

Nigerian medical doctor and politician

The Honourable Jamila Bio Ibrahim

Minister for Youth Development
- In office 16 October 2023 – 23 October 2024
- President: Bola Tinubu
- Preceded by: Sunday Dare
- Succeeded by: Ayodele Olawande

Personal details
- Born: Nigeria
- Education: M.B.B.S, University of Ilorin
- Occupation: Medical doctor, politician

Jamila Bio Ibrahim Pronounciation (born February 7, 1986) is a Nigerian medical doctor, development specialist and politician, who formerly served as Nigeria's Minister of Youth. She was known for her advocacy of the UN SDGs and her role as former Minister of Youth. She was appointed to the position by President Bola Tinubu in September 2023. Prior to her appointment, she served as the president of the Progressive Young Women Forum (PYWF). She has also served as the Senior Special Assistant to the Kwara State Governor on Sustainable Development Goals (SDGs).

Her father Ibrahim Bio is a former Minister of Transportation and Minister for the National Sports Commission during former President Umaru Musa Yar'Adua's and former President Goodluck Jonathan's administrations respectively.

In May 2024, Bio Ibrahim announced the approval for the allocation of N110 billion in capital for the Nigeria Youth Investment Fund, through a collaboration with the Bank of Industry to provide access to loans and support services for startups and early growth stage businesses for the youth demographic.

Jamila Ibrahim completed her primary education at NEPA Staff School in New-Bussa, Borgu LGA, Niger State and attended Federal Government Girls’ College, Bwari, Abuja for her secondary education, graduating in 2002. She earned an M.B.B.S from the University of Ilorin in 2010 and later completed a six-month course on health management and leadership at the University of Washington in 2017.

In November 2017, Ibrahim founded the Yon Seno Foundation, an NGO. She was also a member of the national policy summit think-tank that year. She volunteered on the Presidential Committee on the North-East Initiative (PCNI) under former President Muhammadu Buhari and was the secretary for the subcommittee on health, women's affairs, population and environment of the transition committee of Kwara State Governor AbdulRahman AbdulRazaq in 2019.

== Career/Education ==
Jamila, a Nigerian medical doctor, politician, and development expert, she is a native Baruten Local Government, Kwara State.

Her education began at NEPA Staff School in New-Bussa, Niger State and afterward, she attended Federal Government Girls' College, Bwari, Abuja, Where she graduated 2002.

== Awards and Recognitions ==
- Clean Nigeria Ambassador
- UN Peace Ambassador
- Distinguished Honorary Award
