= Embassy of Nigeria, Cairo =

Diplomatic mission of Nigeria in Egypt

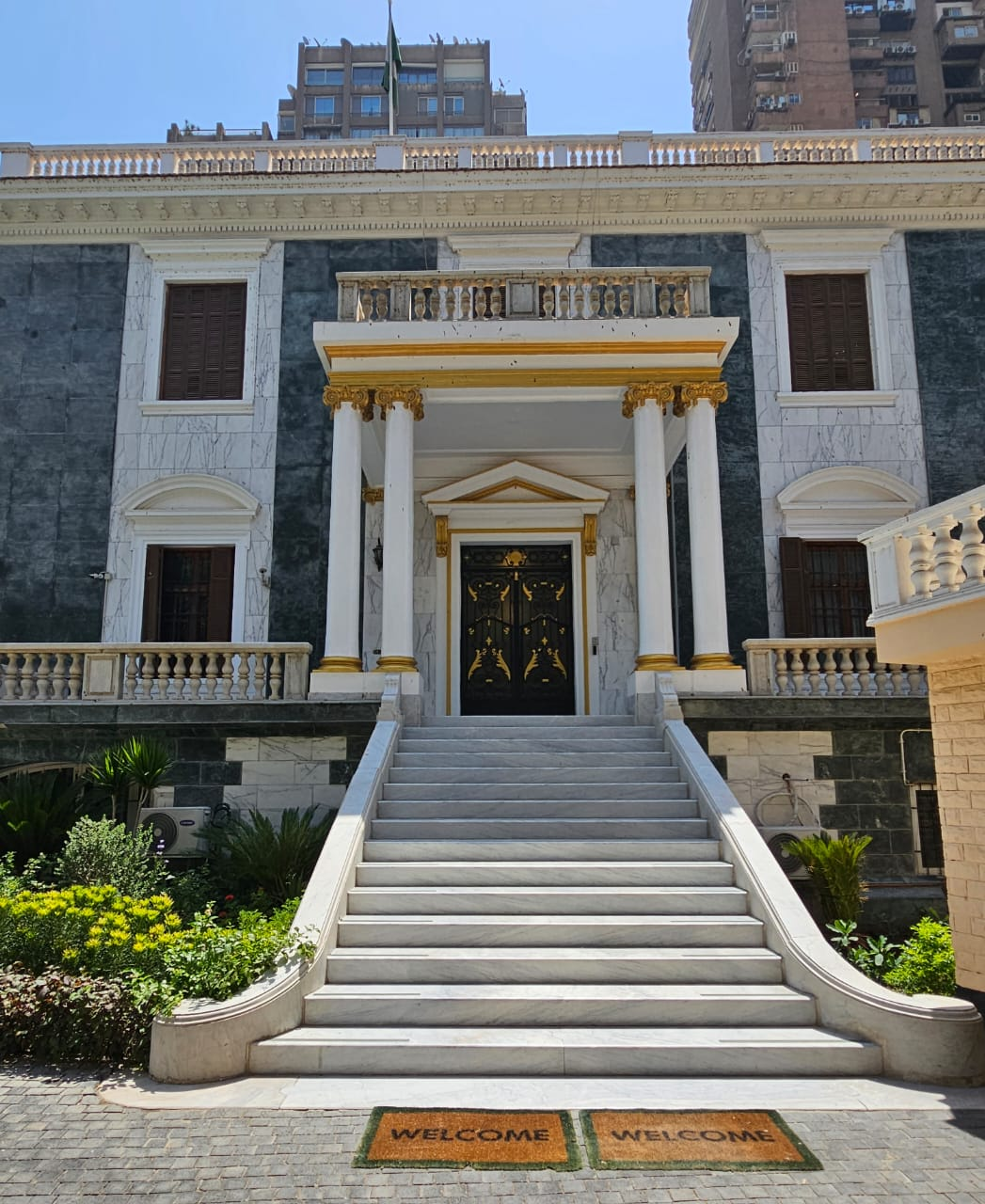
- Location: Cairo, Arab Republic of Egypt
- Address: No. 13, Gabalaya Street, Zamalek, Cairo, Egypt.
- Coordinates: 30°03′19″N 31°13′05″E
- Ambassador: Nura Abba Rimi (since 2021)
- Website: cairo.foreignaffairs.gov.ng

The Embassy of Nigeria in Cairo is the diplomatic mission of the Federal Republic of Nigeria to the Arab Republic of Egypt. The embassy is located at No. 13, Gabalaya Street, Zamalek, Cairo, and is responsible for the promotion of Nigeria’s National Interest and the protection of Nigerian citizens in Egypt, as well as the promotion of bilateral relations between the two countries.

Nura Abba Rimi was appointed as Nigeria's ambassador to Egypt in 2021.

== History ==
The Nigerian embassy building was officially opened in Cairo in the year 2000. However, diplomatic relations between Nigeria and Egypt have a long history, dating back to the early years of Nigerian independence. The two nations established diplomatic ties in 1961 as a result of the strong bond that existed between Abubakar Tafawa Balewa, the first prime minister of Nigeria, and Egyptian President Gamal Abdel Nasser. Since then, the relationship between Nigeria and Egypt has been marked by mutual cooperation and support in various fields, including political, economic, and cultural.

Throughout the 1960s and 1970s, Nigeria and Egypt were two of the most influential countries in Africa. Nigeria had the largest population in Africa and its economy was growing rapidly. Egypt was also a major regional power and was a leader in the non-aligned movement. Both countries were instrumental in promoting economic growth and development, as well as regional stability in the region. They played a major role in the establishment of the Organization of African Unity (OAU), the precursor to the African Union.

Nigeria and Egypt continued to strengthen their economic and political ties between the 70s and 90s. They signed trade, cultural cooperation, and science and technology agreements.

Despite the 2008 financial crisis, Egyptian exports to Nigeria rose by 160% in 2009. Some major Egyptian companies, including Arab Contractors and Orascom Construction, have invested over US$1.4 billion in Nigeria. At the same time, private sector initiatives like the Egyptian Nigerian Business Council have been established to promote business cooperation. Egypt Air's presence in Nigeria has helped increase tourism to Cairo, and the availability of over 150 Egyptian physicians throughout Nigeria has contributed to the country's growing medical tourism industry. Presently, numerous Nigerian students are pursuing engineering, medical and other degree programs at various Egyptian universities, and there are also hundreds of Nigerian students who are taking advantage of scholarships provided by the Egyptian government and Al-Azhar Sheikhdom.

When the African Union suspended Egypt from all its activities after the Egyptian army ousted the elected president, Mohamed Mursi and suspended its constitution, Nigeria stood firmly behind Egypt to guarantee their comeback to the Union.

According to data, in 2020, Egypt exported goods worth $136 million to Nigeria, with an annual growth rate of 19.6% over the past 25 years. Nigeria, on the other hand, exported goods valued at $4.2 million to Egypt, mainly consisting of spices. Nigeria's exports to Egypt increased at an annual rate of 11.6%, from $271,000 in 1995 to $4.2 million in 2020.

The numbers fall below the expected outcome of the diplomatic relations between both countries as they confront domestic challenges as well as regional and international geopolitical complexities that hamper greater political and economic prosperity. Ahmed Jazbhay identifies decoloniality as the clog in the wheel of both economies.

Nigeria and Egypt are both members of the Organization of the Petroleum Exporting Countries (OPEC), the African Union and the African Development Bank as well as other multilateral organizations such as the Organization of Islamic Cooperation (OIC), Developing 8, Non-Aligned Movement, Group of 15, Group of 24, and Group of 77.

== MOUs, agreements and high-level visits between Nigeria and Egypt ==
Nigeria and Egypt have developed a strong foundation for cooperation through a series of agreements and memorandums of understanding in various sectors. These agreements serve as frameworks for collaboration and facilitate regular visits between leaders and government officials of both countries. One significant agreement is the 1974 Agreement on Cultural and Scientific Cooperation, which promotes cultural exchange and the sharing of scientific knowledge. Another notable agreement is the 1982 Agreement on Economic, Scientific, and Technical Cooperation, which aims to enhance collaboration in these areas.

Additionally, the 2000 Memorandum of Understanding for Political Consultations strengthens political ties and facilitates regular consultations between the two countries. Agreements between export promotion centres, diplomatic institutes, and academic institutions further promote cooperation in specific fields. The MOU on Health and Medicine, signed in 2002, fosters collaboration in healthcare initiatives, while the 2004 MOU on Telecommunications and Information Technology promotes joint efforts in these sectors.

In 2018, the two countries signed MoUs in various sectors, including investment, trade, and cultural cooperation. During the visit of President Muhammadu Buhari to Egypt, the two countries signed agreements worth $2.5 billion for projects in the areas of infrastructure, energy, and agriculture.

Leaders from Nigeria and Egypt have continued to engage in several mutual visits, demonstrating their commitment to bilateral relations. In 2010, Dr Ahmed Nazeef, the Prime Minister of Egypt, visited Nigeria to lead the Egyptian delegation at the D8 Summit. This high-level visit emphasized the importance of economic cooperation within the D8 framework. Additionally, Chairman of the Supreme Council for Sports, traveled to Nigeria to attend meetings of the supreme council for Sports in Africa. This visit highlighted the shared interest in promoting sports development across the continent. Also, Amin Abaza, Minister of Agriculture from Egypt, visited Nigeria to explore opportunities for collaboration in the agricultural sector. These visits were reciprocated by Nigerian officials, including the Permanent Secretary of the Foreign Ministry, the Minister of Science and Technology, and delegations from the Nigerian National Commissions for Museums and Monuments, as well as the Nigerian National Art Gallery.

Egypt has had top governmental visits from Nigeria. Muhammadu Buhari, President of the Federal Republic of Nigeria, visited Egypt in December 2019 to attend Aswan Security Forum organized under the auspices of Abdul Fattah Al-Sisi, President of the Arab Republic of Egypt. The Forum had the presence of other African leaders, and the Nigerian president was accompanied by ministers and top government officials. In December 2018 Yemi Osinbajo, vice-president of the Federal Republic of Nigeria, attended the Intra-African Trade Fair whereby the African Export-Import Bank (Afrexim Bank) signed an agreement with the Nigerian Export Promotion Council and the Nigerian Export-Import Bank (NEXIM), launching a $1-billion Nigeria-Africa Trade and Investment Promotion Programme (NATIPP) aimed at promoting and expanding trade and investments between Nigeria and the rest of Africa. The Executive Governor of Borno State, Babagana Umara Zulum, visited in November 2020, followed by the visit of Uchechukwu S. Ogah, Minister of State for Mines and Steel Development of the Federal Republic of Nigeria, and then Minister of Communications and Digital Economy of the Federal Republic of Nigeria, Isa Ali Ibrahim Pantami, in January 2021. The Executive Governor of Kaduna State, Nasir Ahmed El-Rufai, visited in 2021 and 2022 to invite Egyptian investors to tap into investment opportunities in Kaduna State. Also, Ambassador Joseph Chiedu Keshi was in Egypt as the Special Envoy of President Muhammadu Buhari of the Federal Republic of Nigeria to Abdel Fattah el-Sisi, President of the Arab Republic of Egypt, on Wednesday 27 January 2021.

These visits, agreements, and memorandums, facilitate discussions and exchanges in various fields, promoting cooperation between the two countries.

== Defence and security cooperation ==
Military collaboration between Nigerian and Egypt has increased, starting with Nigeria's Independence in 1960. Personnel of the Nigerian military and security services have been given access to various military training courses in Egypt.

Egypt has over the years been engaged in fighting insurgency, terrorism and religious extremism, and has defeated terrorist organizations. The Egyptian Armed Forces have been engaged in military operations to liberate the Sinai Peninsula from activities of terrorists loyal to "Islamic State" (IS/ISIS). Similarly, Nigeria has been engaged in fighting the Boko Haram terrorist group. The two countries have formed military ties based on countering terrorist organizations.

== Nigerians in Egypt ==
In 1924, Gordon J. Lethem, an officer in the Colonial Service in Nigeria (1886-1962), investigating Nigerian communities in Egypt found that the Nigerian community was mainly concentrated in two areas: those associated with the "riwak al-barnawiya," which was described as "the section in al-Azhar for all West Africans, including all students from west of Wadai," and those attending the Surur Agha Mosque in the Mugharbalin area of the city. He estimated that there were around 200 Nigerians living in Egypt, with 61 families in Lower Egypt (including 41 families in Cairo) and the rest scattered in other places like Alexandria, Zagazig, Suez, and Ismailia.

Nigerians in Egypt worked in various occupations such as tradesmen, customs interpreters, pharmacist assistants, sweet sellers, doormen, servants, messengers, and soldiers. They also practiced the occult sciences, which included geomancy, astrology, divination, alchemy, magic squares, spiritual magic, and dream interpretation. These practices were highly valued by many Egyptian shaykhs, with numerology being particularly esteemed. A renowned Nigerian scholar of falak (astronomy) in the al-Azhar community was Muhammad al-Fulani al-Kashinawi (d. 1741), who was known for his unparalleled knowledge of numerology and his work on magic. His book, "al-Durr al-manzum wa khulasat al-sirr al-maktum fi 'ilm al-talasim wa'l nujum," was still available in Cairo bookshops in the early 1970s.

In the 21st century the Nigerian community in Egypt is largely made up of students, most of whom are studying at Al-Azhar University in Cairo and other government and private universities within Egypt. However, the population of Nigerian students in other higher institutions in the country, particularly private institutions, has increased since the launching of the "Study in Egypt" initiative of the Egyptian Government, aimed at attracting foreign students to study at Egyptian universities at undergraduate and postgraduate levels. Some Nigerians also work in the country in some international financial institutions and regional organization such as Afrexim Bank, African-Re, Citigroup, Coca-Cola and Pepsi. Others work with multinational corporations such as Shell, and a few work with Egyptian establishments and private businesses. Another group of Nigerians in Egypt is made up of fortune-seekers who intended to travel to Europe but found themselves stranded in the country. The group, whose number is estimated at between 800 and 1,500, often end up as domestic servants. The Nigerian Community in Egypt has, with the help of the Mission, become organized. The Community held an election in 2020 and a pioneer President was elected for a five-year tenure.

== Embassy services ==
=== The embassy ===
The Nigerian embassy in Cairo is tasked with the mission of promoting and protecting Nigeria's national interests while representing and protecting the interests of Nigerian citizens and legal entities abroad. The embassy also promotes African integration and supports African unity while advocating for international cooperation in consolidating universal peace and mutual respect among nations.

The embassy's commitment to promoting Nigerian interests is reflected in its various activities, which include providing consular services to Nigerian citizens, facilitating trade and investment between Nigeria and Egypt, and promoting cultural exchange between the two countries.

=== Passport services ===
The embassy has an Immigration Section staffed by Nigeria Immigration Service (NIS) Officers who oversee the issuance and renewal of passports and ETC to Nigerians in Egypt.

=== Visa services ===
The Federal Government of Nigeria has outsourced the processing of visas through a company, Online Integrated Solutions (OIS), whose mandate is to collect visa applications, capture the biometrics of visa applicants, and forward the applications to the embassy for processing and approvals.

=== Consular services ===
The embassy offers various consular services to Nigerians in Egypt, such as issuance of introduction letters for admission to various institutions and universities, letters of recommendation (To Whom it May Concern), letters for extension of residence visa (non-students), introduction letters to other Embassies for visas, as well as visits to Egyptian prisons to see Nigerian inmates, etc.

Official working hours of the embassy are 9:00 am – 3:00 pm, from Sunday to Thursday (Friday and Saturday as weekends).

== Embassy officials ==
As of May 2023 embassy officials are:

- Nura Abba Rimi, Ambassador/ Head of Mission
- Musa Ahmadu, Minister (Political Affairs)
- Adesoye Samotu, Minister (Economic Affairs)
- Aisha Ibrahim Labaran, Minister Counsellor/ Head of Chancery
- Ejezie Amobi Emmanuel, First Secretary (Political)
- Abdulrasaq Lanre Saliu, First Secretary (Consular & Welfare)
- Halima Attahiru, Administrative Attaché I
- Philomina Nicodemus Ogbu, Confidential Secretary
- Peter Achimugu, Communication Officer
- Audu Hassan Adeleke, Finance Attaché

=== Defense section ===
- Maj. Gen. Baba Umar Yahaya, Defence Adviser
- Navy Captain Abubakar Umar Sani, Deputy Defence Attaché
- Flt. Lt. Bernard Edako, Deputy Defence Attaché (Finance)
- Staff Sgt. Bukar Yakubu, Defence Chief Clerk

=== Immigration section ===
- Usman Shuaibu Aliyu, Immigration Attaché I
- Ibrahim Bashir Ibrahim, Immigration Attaché II

=== Ambassadors ===
Ambassadors and Heads of mission since inauguration have been:

Ambassador	Time in office
Muhammad Ngileruma	1962 – 1967
Osman Ahmadu-Suka	1968 – 1973
Haruna Bin Musa	1973 – 1976
Abdulkadir Zailani Mahmud	1976 – 1978
Abdulkadir M.S. Imam	1978 – 1984
Umaru Bashir Wali	1984 – 1989
Mustafa Sam	1989 – 1993
Mahmud Imam	Mar. 1999 – Oct. 1999
Abubakar Udu, mni	2000 – 2003
Mohammed Gali Umar	2004 – 2007
Sani Lawal Mohammed, mni	2008 – 2010
Baba Gana Wakil, mni	2010 – 2012
(Sen.) Lawan Gana Guba	2012 – 2015
Dandatti Abdulkadir	2017 – 2020
Nura Abba Rimi	Since 2021

=== Embassy holidays ===
The embassy observes all the public holidays in both Nigeria and Egypt.

== Gallery ==
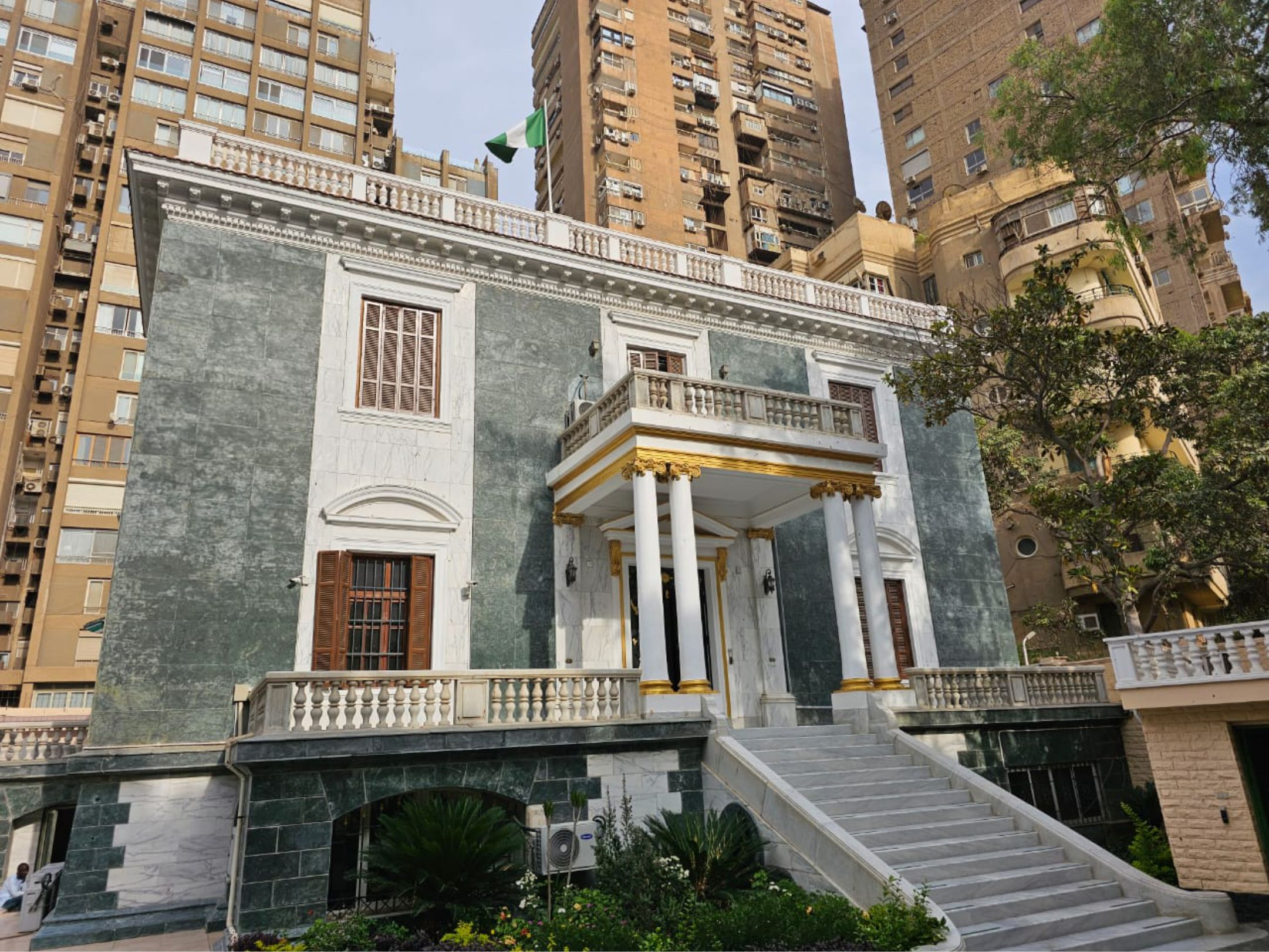
A view of the Nigeria Embassy, Cairo

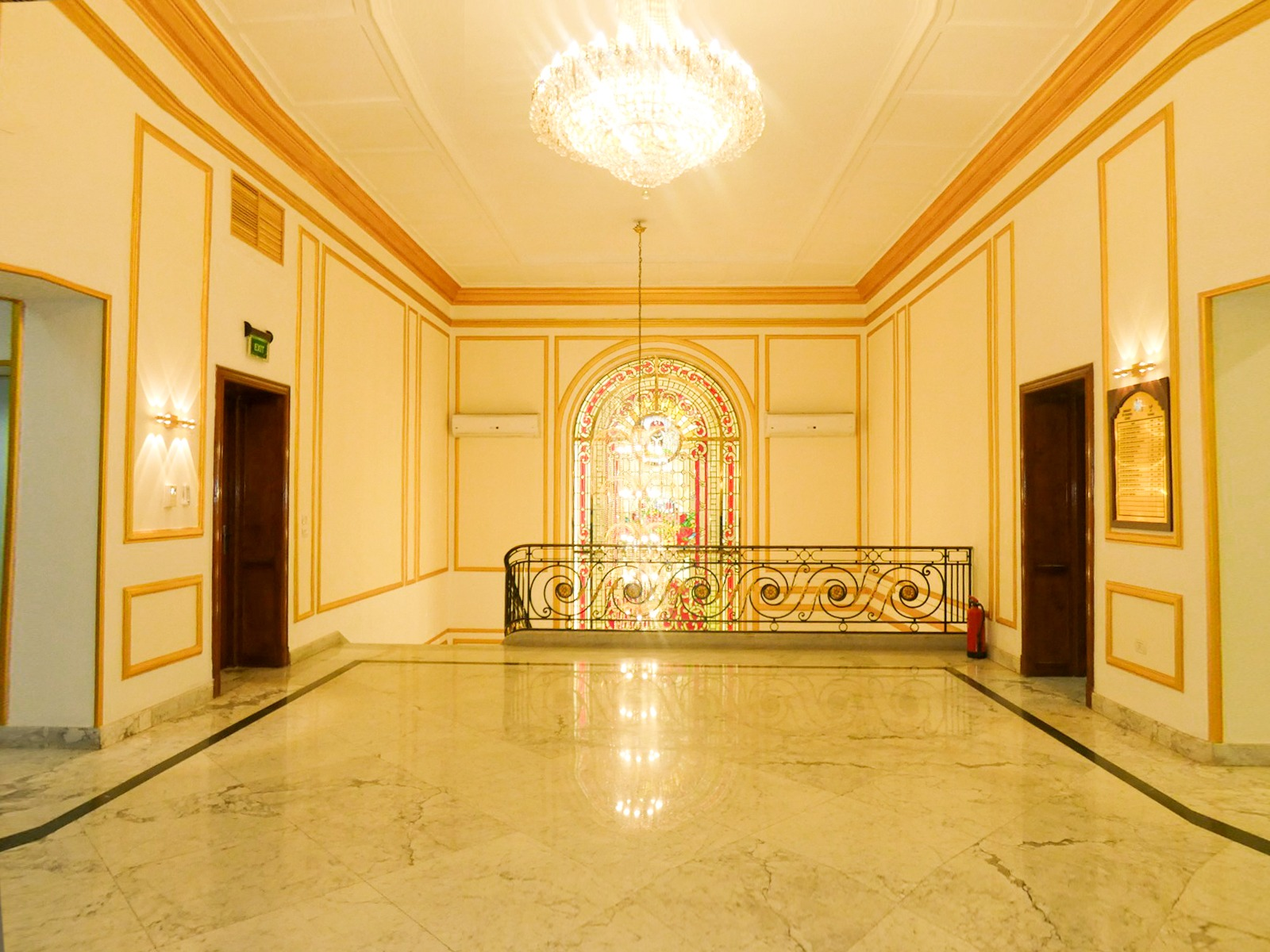
Foyer at the Nigeria Embassy, Cairo

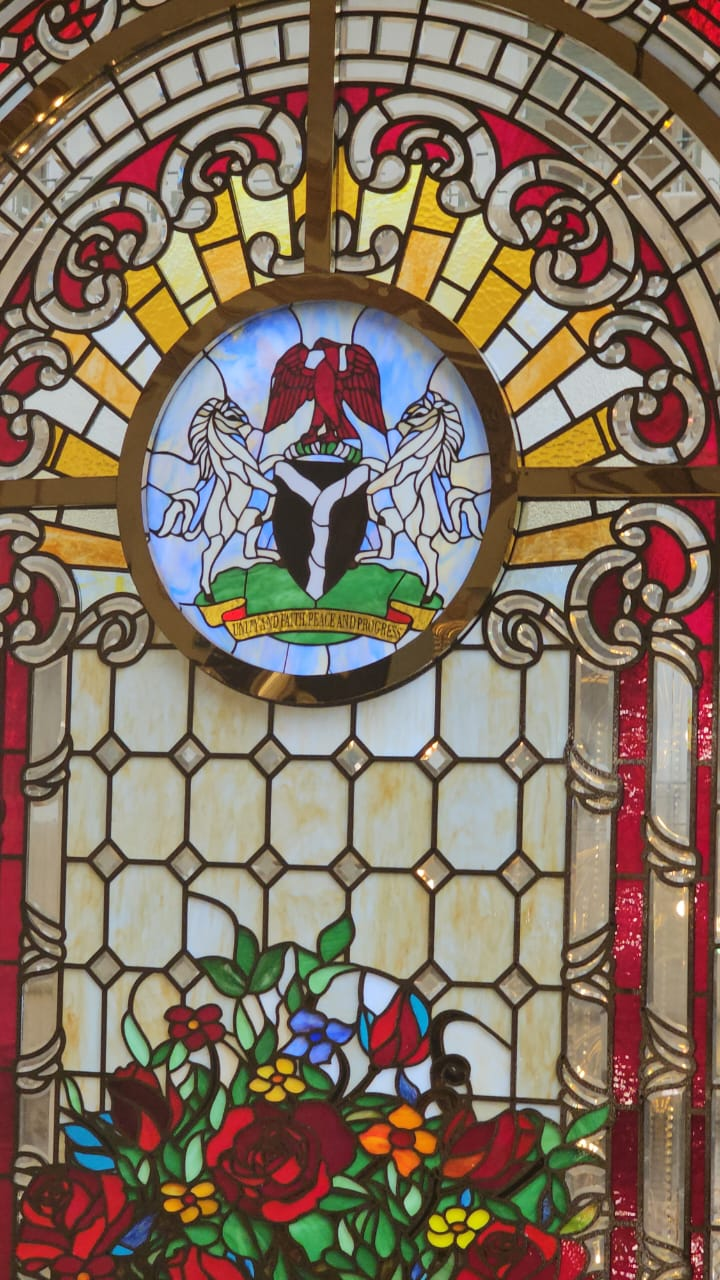
Stained glass showing the coat of arms of Nigeria at the Embassy of Nigeria, Cairo

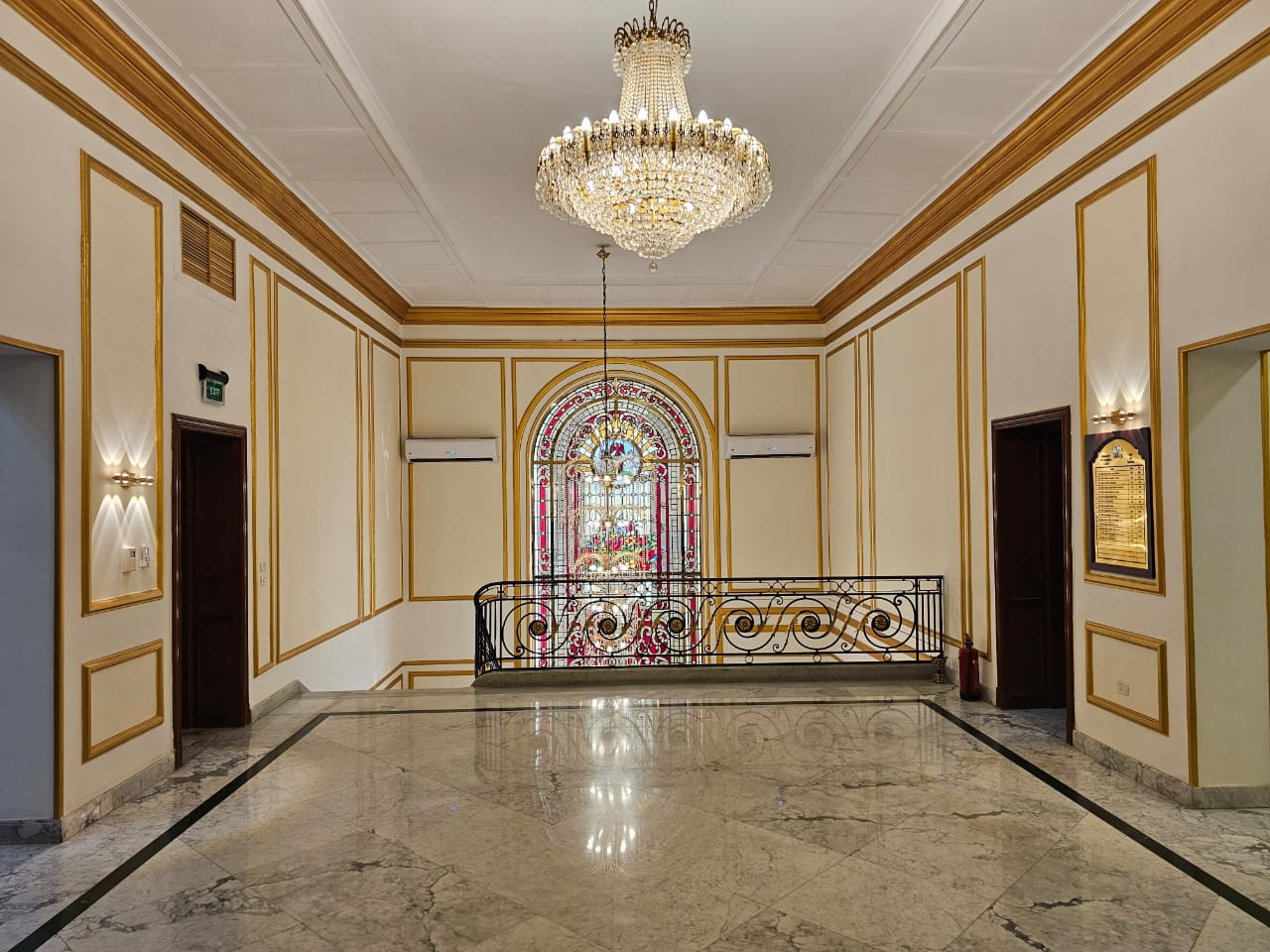
A view of the foyer at Embassy of Nigeria, Cairo

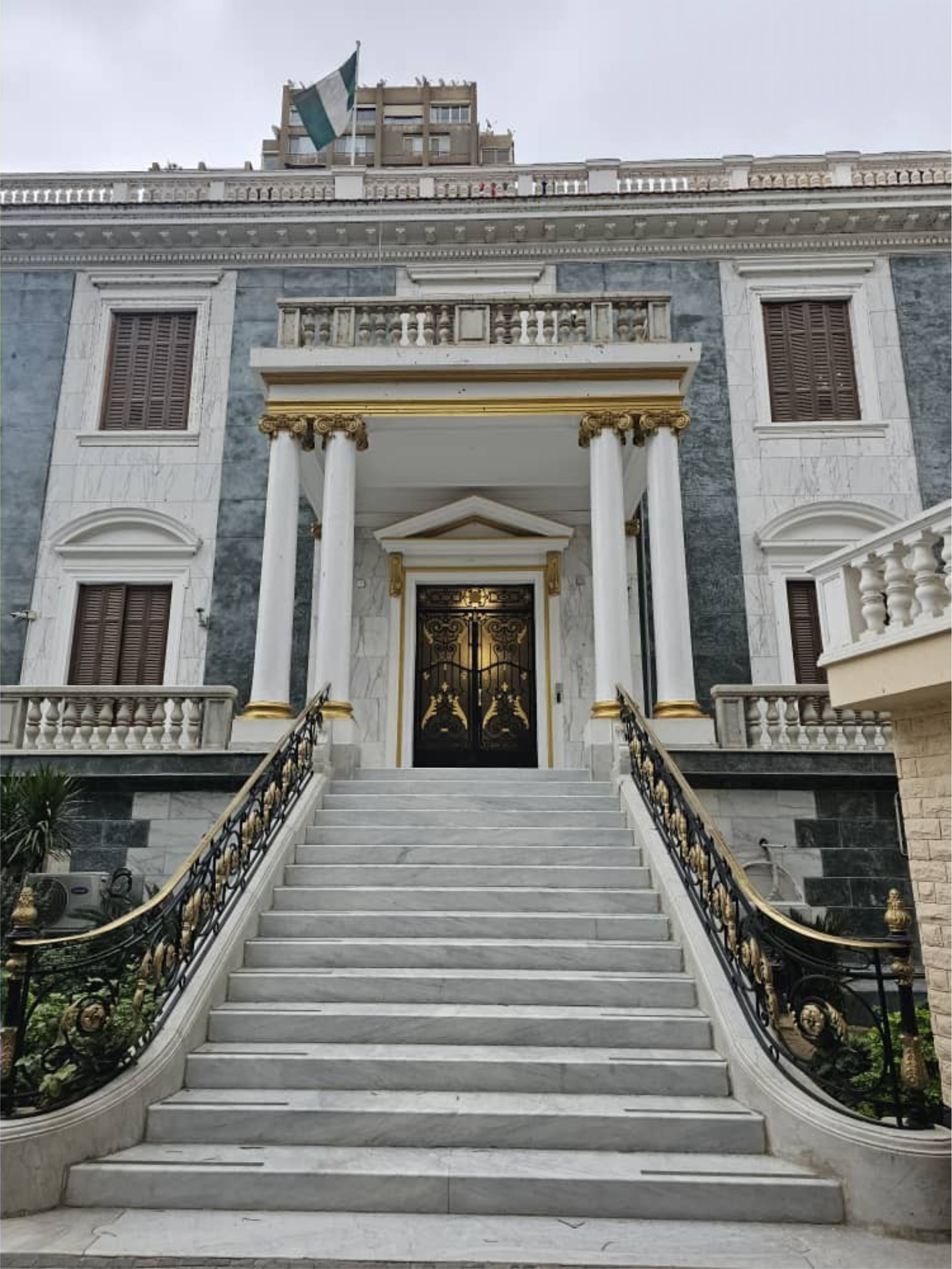
Front view of the Nigeria Embassy, Cairo

== See also ==
- Nigerians in Egypt
