= Federal Ministry of Art, Culture and Creative Economy =

Nigerian Federal Ministry

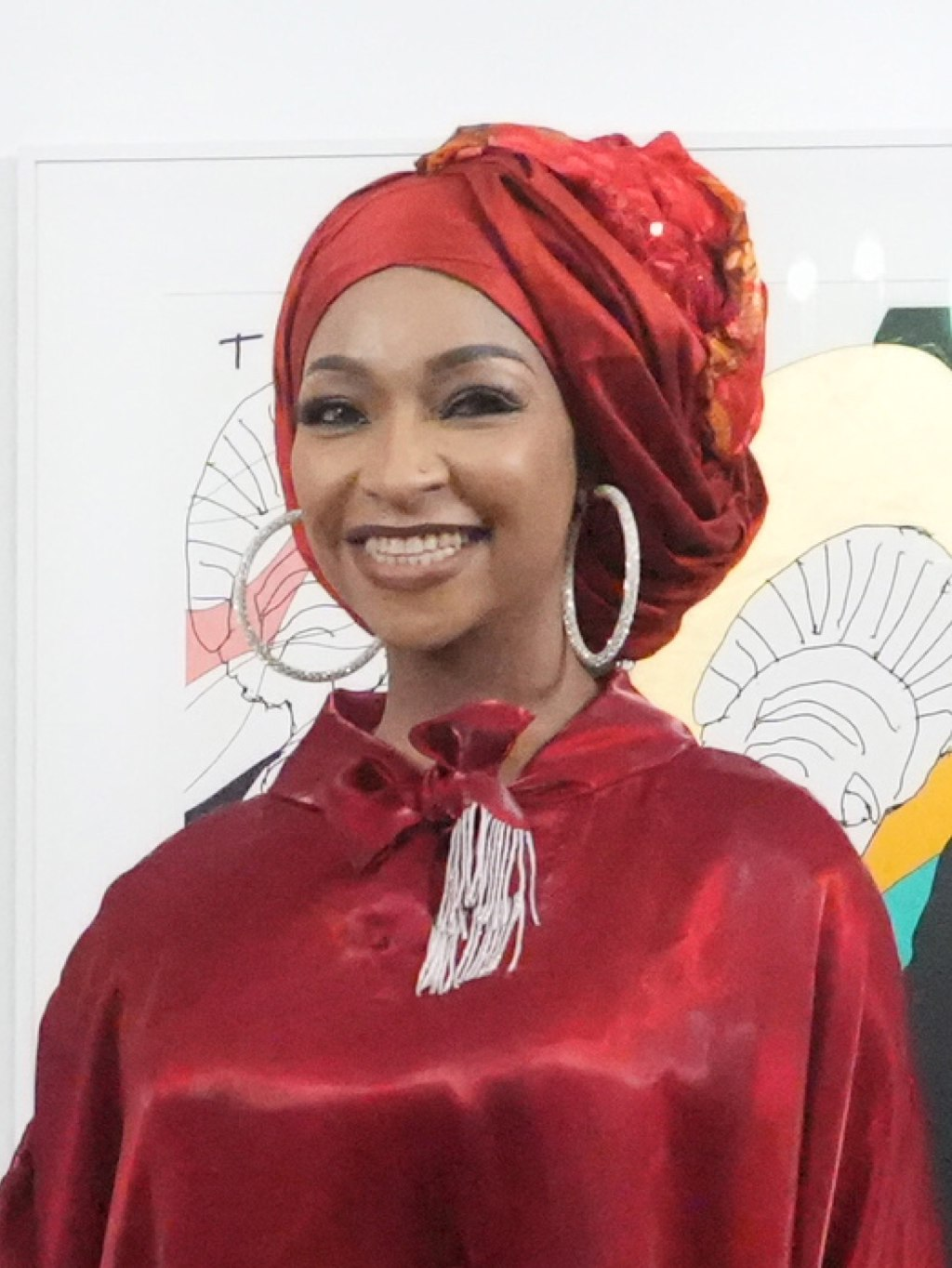
Photo of Hannatu Musa Musawa - The Honourable Minister for Art, Culture and Creative Economy

The Federal Ministry of Art, Culture, Tourism and Creative Economy is a government agency in Nigeria. It is responsible for promoting and developing arts, culture, and creative industries in the country. Its main goal is to use the power of arts and creativity to boost the economy, preserve Nigeria’s cultural heritage, and share the country's culture with the world. Hannatu Musa Musawa is the current minister of Art, Culture and Creative Economy.

== History ==
The Ministry was established in November 2023 by President Bola Ahmed Tinubu and later consolidated in October 2024 through a merger with the Federal Ministry of Tourism, following the dismissal of then-Minister Lola Ade-John. The unified Ministry — now known as the Federal Ministry of Art, Culture, Tourism, and Creative Economy — is under the leadership of Minister Hannatu Musa Musawa, Esq..
