= Nigeria Youth SDGs Network =

Youth organization in Nigeria

Nigeria Youth SDGs Network, officially registered as the Network of Youth for Sustainable Initiative, is a youth-led and youth-serving civil society organization dedicated to localizing the United Nations Sustainable Development Goals (SDGs). Launched in April 2017, the organisation aims to engage young Nigerians in advancing sustainable development efforts.

== Goal ==
The primary goals of NGYouthSDGs are to advocate for meaningful youth engagement in the development of Nigeria by focusing on:

Education and Capacity Development: Enhancing the skills and knowledge of young people to contribute to sustainable development.

Employment and Livelihoods: Promoting decent work and economic growth for young Nigerians.

Civic Participation: Encouraging active involvement of youth in governance and policy-making processes.

== The Network and the UN ==
NGYouthSDGs has been actively collaborating with various international and national organizations to promote youth engagement and sustainable development.

Funding and Partnerships: The organization with funding from the United Nations Department of Economics and Social Affairs worked with the International Labour Organization and the Federal Ministry of Youth and Sports towards the revision of the Nigeria Youth Employment Action Plan (2021-2024).

Decent Work Survey: In August 2020, NGYouthSDGs launched a survey to understand the decent work aspirations of young Nigerians in light of COVID-19 and how they want policymakers to support them. More than 100,000 young people responded to the survey over a six weeks period. This was followed by a youth validation workshop held across the 36 states of Nigeria and the FCT. The Nigeria Youth Employment Action Plan was launched in September 2021 and is estimated to meet the decent work aspirations of 3.5 million young Nigerians annually. Decent work aspirations of young people Following the launch of the Nigeria Youth Employment Action Plan, NGYouthSDGs with support from the International Labour Organization launched the Skills for Employment Programme, a seven weeks digital skills programme for youth age 18 to 29 whose education or livelihoods was impacted by the COVID19 pandemic. The programme focused on digital marketing, website development and graphics design with 90 young people in Adamawa, Benue and Lagos participating.

As part of the mission of NGYouthSDGs in building the capacity of young Nigerians to advocate in policies and programs that will enable youth to lead and thrive, NGYouthSDGs with funding from the United Nations Information Centre trained 360 young people in Adamawa, Anambra, Kaduna, Kwara, Ondo and Rivers states on environmental and climate justice.

== August 12 Celebration ==
Annually, the organization commemorates the International Youth Day on August 12 and uses that opportunity to showcase youth leading action for sustainable development while providing seed grants for youth social entrepreneurs.

=== 2017 ===
The inaugural event in 2017, themed "On the Road to Implementation," encouraged youth collaboration and inspired private sector and government partnerships with young people.

=== 2018 - 2019 ===
In 2018 and 2019, the Youth Day was held across 21 states in Nigeria with the theme "Amplifying Youth Voices.

=== 2020 ===
Amid the COVID-19 pandemic in 2020, NGYouthSDGs partnered with Oxfam in Nigeria to provide three organisations with grants totaling three hundred thousand naira ($833).

=== 2021 ===
In 2021, the organization supported three organizations in agriculture with seed funding of six hundred thousand naira ($1,666).

=== 2022 ===
For the 2022 International Youth Day, NG Youth SDGs and Oxfam in Nigeria launched the Spotlight Awards to celebrate young people who are leading local action for the Sustainable Development Goals.

=== 2023 ===
The Youth Day event, themed "Working with and for Youth towards Achieving the SDGs," focused on intergenerational collaboration to bridge the gap and create decent jobs for youth. The highlight of the event was the reveal of ten recipients of the Youth Spotlight Awards. The event highlighted the pivotal role of youth leadership in supporting a just transition to the green and digital economy.

In a bid to localize the Sustainable Development Goals, the organization created the SDGs Playbook which contains 200 actionable steps that people can take for SDGs action. The organization is working with Mastercard Foundation to reduce the spread of COVID-19 in 25 communities across 10 states in Nigeria. The organization has been recognized by the United Nations as an SDGs Good Practice.

As part of Nigeria Youth SDGs thought leadership drive, the organization will be hosting a sustainability workshop at the 2022 One Young World Summit in Manchester in partnership with AdamStart. During the event, it will share about the SDGs Playbook, a resource material to activate youth action for the SDGs and providing funding for youth movement in Nigeria with support from VOICE.

=== Youth Leadership in Climate Action ===
NGYouthSDGs with support from the German Missions in Nigeria provides capacity building for 15 youth organisations in Delta, Enugu, Kaduna, Nasarawa and Ondo states to advocate for youth leadership in the implementation of Nigeria's Nationally Determined Contributions and the National Adaptation Plan. The project also provides support for 300 young people to advocate for youth inclusion in the NDCs and provision of grant to ten youth innovations to combat climate change in the states.
