= Nigerians in Egypt =

Nigerians in Egypt النيجيريون في مصر
- (Nigeria) (Egypt)

Total population
- No official estimate

Regions with significant populations
- Cairo, Alexandria, Giza

Languages
- English (Nigerian English), Igbo, Hausa, Yoruba, other languages of Nigeria; Arabic

Religion
- Predominantly Islam and Christianity

Nigerians in Egypt (Arabic: النيجيريون في مصر, Al-Nīǧīriyūn fī Maṣr) are people born in the Federal Republic of Nigeria or who hold Nigerian nationality and reside in the Arab Republic of Egypt. They are a small community compared to other Nigerian diasporas in Africa; however, they are primarily students, professionals, and traders who contribute to the cultural and economic exchanges between the two countries.

== History ==
Historically, trans-Saharan trade routes connected the areas of present-day Nigeria and Egypt for centuries. Nomadic and semi-nomadic peoples traveled along these routes to exchange goods such as salt, gold, textiles, agricultural products and even slaves until before the abolition of slavery, facilitating early contact between communities from the two regions.

Relations between Egypt and the Kanem–Bornu Empire were characterized by intermittent diplomatic, commercial, and religious exchanges across the Sahara. The Kanem–Bornu Empire, which at its height encompassed a large portion of what is today northern Nigeria, maintained sustained contact with Cairo due to shared Islamic affiliations and the strategic importance of trans-Saharan trade routes.

In 1924, census records indicated that around 200 individuals from British colonial Nigeria were residing in the Kingdom of Egypt. During this colonial era, when both Nigeria and Egypt were under British rule and influence, a number of Nigerian students traveled to study at Al-Azhar Mosque in Cairo. This institution, one of the most prestigious centers of Islamic scholarship, attracted West African Muslims seeking advanced religious and linguistic education. Among these students was Adam Abdullah Al-Ilory (1917–1992), who later became a prominent Islamic scholar and reformer in Nigeria. After his studies at Al-Azhar, he founded the Arabic and Islamic Training Centre (popularly known as Markaz) in Lagos, which went on to shape modern Islamic education in the country.

Currently, there are Nigerians residing in Egypt for skilled employment and higher education. Another group includes those who initially intended to migrate further, for example to Europe, but remain in Egypt instead. Some members of this latter group engage in informal or domestic work to support themselves.

== See also ==
- Embassy of Nigeria, Cairo
