= Olamilekan Adegbite =

Nigerian politician

Arc. Olamilekan Adegbite

Minister of Mines and Steel Development
- In office 21 August 2019 – 29 May 2023
- President: Muhammadu Buhari
- Preceded by: Abubakar Bwari
- Succeeded by: Shuaibu Audu as Minister of Mines and Steel Development Dele Alake as Minister of Solid Minerals

Personal details
- Education: University of Lagos
- Profession: Architect, entrepreneur

Olamilekan Adegbite is an architect who served as the Nigerian minister of Mines and Steel Development from 2019 until 2023. Adegbite was formerly the Commissioner for Works and Infrastructure in Ogun State under the Ibikunle Amosun administration.

== Professional background ==
Olamilekan Adegbite is an architect by profession. Before joining the federal cabinet, he served as Commissioner for Works and Infrastructure in Ogun State during the administration of Governor Ibikunle Amosun. During his tenure as a commissioner, he was involved in discussions and policies concerning road construction and infrastructure development in the state. He was later nominated by President Muhammadu Buhari as a ministerial candidate in 2019.

== Commissioner for Works and Infrastructure in Ogun State ==
Adegbite served as Ogun State Commissioner for Works and Infrastructure under Governor Ibikunle Amosun. During his tenure, he spoke publicly on the state government's infrastructure programme, including road construction and the development of the state capital, Abeokuta. He also took part in discussions on the planning and implementation of the administration's infrastructure policies.
