= Henry Dele Alake =

Nigerian journalist, activist and politician (born 1956)

Dele Alake
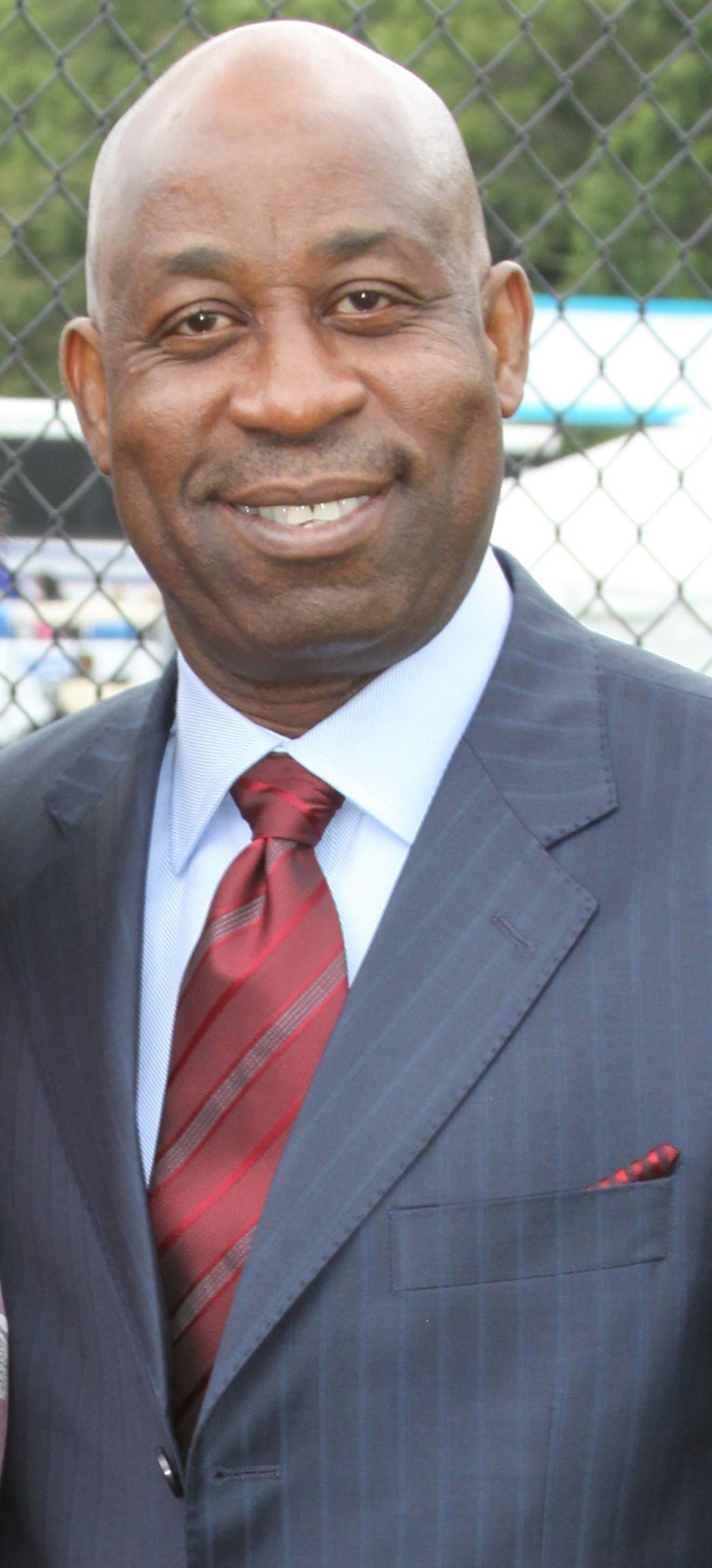

Minister of Solid Minerals Development
- Incumbent
- Assumed office 21 August 2023
- President: Bola Tinubu
- Preceded by: Olamilekan Adegbite

Lagos State Commissioner for Information and Strategy
- In office 6 October 1999 – 29 May 2007
- Governor: Bola Tinubu

Personal details
- Born: Henry Dele Alake; 6 October 1956 (age 69)
- Party: All Progressive Congress
- Education: Igbobi College; University of Lagos
- Occupation: Journalist; activist; politician

Henry Dele Alake (born 6 October 1956) is a Nigerian journalist, activist and technocrat who is the current Nigerian minister of Solid Minerals. He is a former commissioner for Information and Strategy of Lagos State serving from 1999 to 2007.

Alake got involved in active politics in Nigeria as the communication advisor and confidant of Chief Moshood Kashimawo Olawale Abiola - the winner of the annulled June 12 presidential election in Nigeria in 1993. In December 2014, Dele Alake resurfaced in national politics in Nigeria through his appointment as the director of Media and Communication of the Buhari Campaign Organisation to help Nigeria's former head of state, General Muhammadu Buhari to victory in the presidential election in Nigeria in February 2015.

== Education ==
Alake had his primary education at Surulere Baptist Primary School, Surulere, in Lagos from 1961 to 1967. He later moved to Christ's School Ado Ekiti, where he earned the West African School Certificate. He obtained the General Certificate of Education in 1974 while pursuing his Higher School Certificate course at the Igbobi College, Yaba, Lagos, between 1973 and 1975. Later in 1975, he enrolled in the Bachelor of Science (BSc) degree programme in Political Science at the University of Lagos, Akoka, Lagos and graduated in 1978. He later returned to the same university and obtained a master's degree in Mass Communications in 1981.

== Journalist career ==
Alake began his career as a journalist when, as a fresh graduate, he served at the Ogun State Broadcasting Corporation (OGBC) for the National Youth Service Corps (NYSC) programme. After completing the one year national service as made compulsory by the Nigerian government, Alake secured an appointment at the Lagos State Broadcasting Corporation (LSBC) as Senior Sub-Editor in which capacity he served till 1980. He had served as Current Affairs Officer and Senior Current Affairs Officer, and was later made Principal Current Affairs Officer in 1983. Through his experience in broadcast media, Alake contributed to the establishment of Lagos Television (LTV 8), the sister station of his employers, the Lagos State Broadcasting Corporation. After a successful engagement in broadcast journalism, Alake moved into print media. In late 1985, he joined the Concord Press publishers of the Concord Group of Newspapers – National Concord and Sunday Concord, as a writer and editor. A year after his employment, he became a columnist in the National Concord and served in that capacity until 1989. Later that year, he was appointed editor of Sunday Concord, a post he held till 1995. Before then he doubled as a columnist in the Sunday Concord. Later in 1995, he became editor of the National Concord, a post he retained till June 1999.

== Political career ==
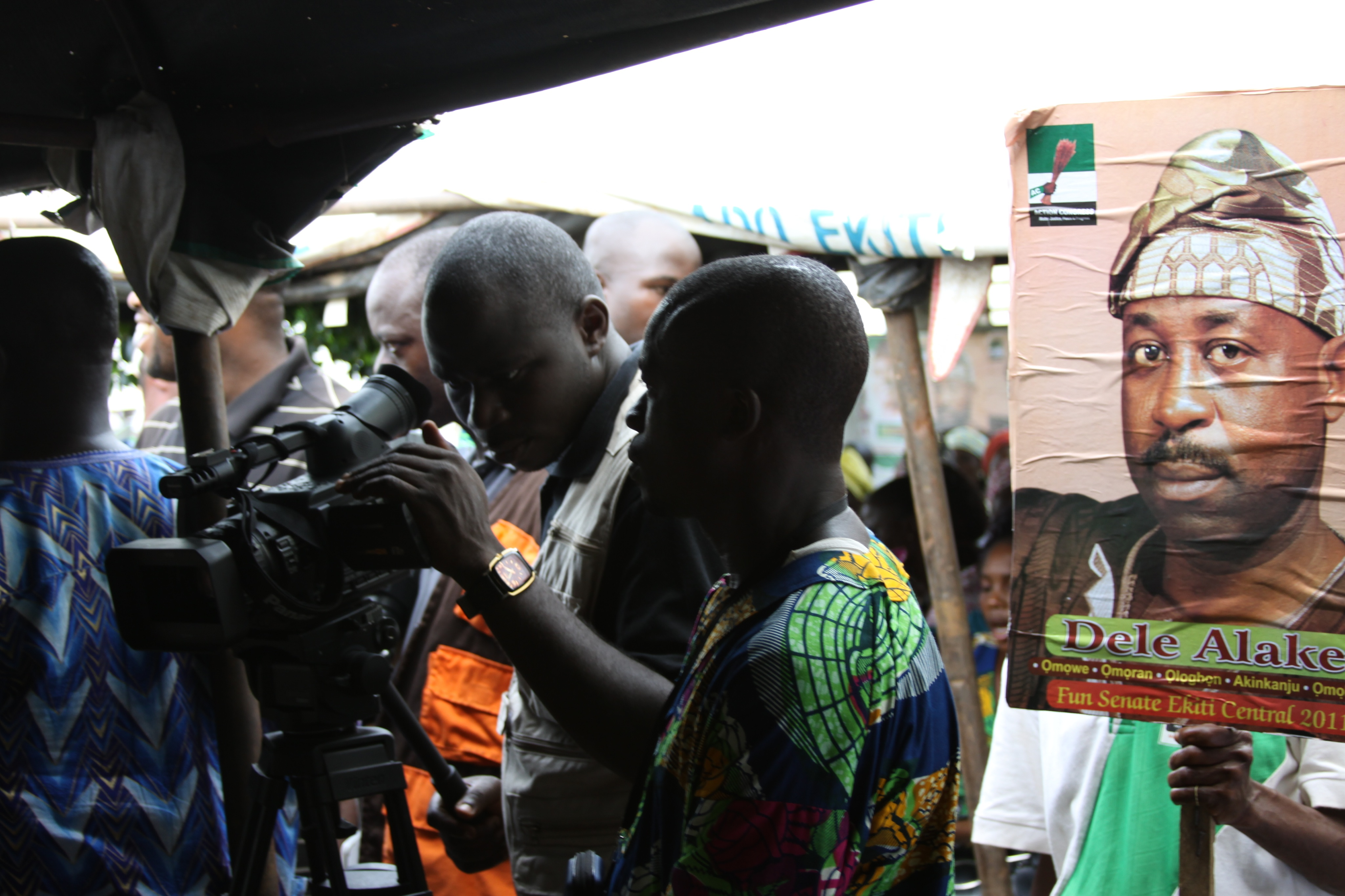
Supporters of Dele Alake During Alake's Senatorial Campaign

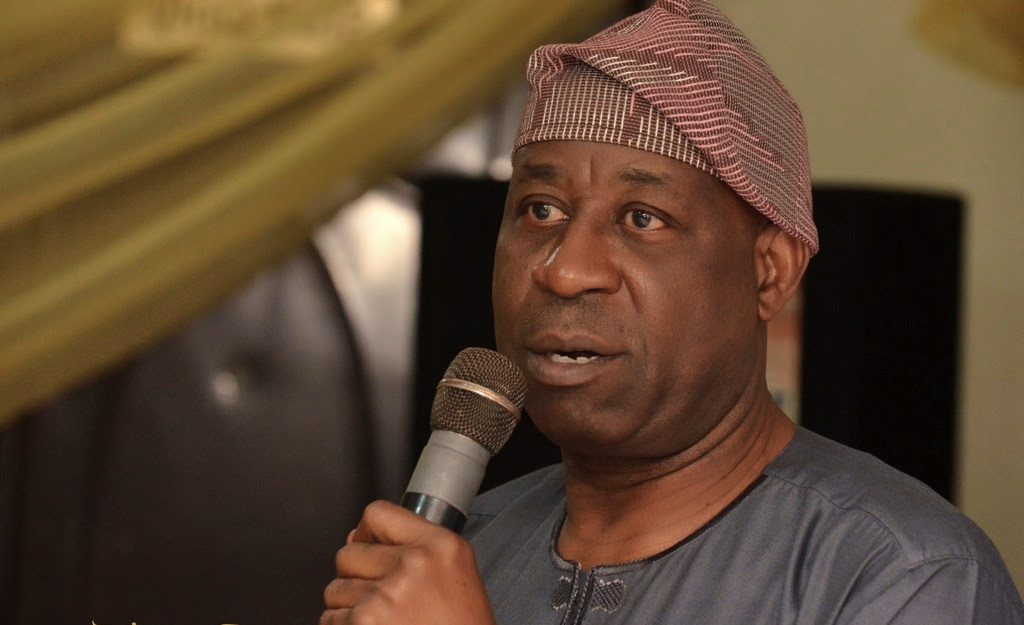
Dele Alake Speaking at a Public Function

Alake was drawn into politics when he was made the Adviser on Information to his employer and mentor, late Bashorun M.K.O. Abiola (publisher of the Concord Group of Newspapers) to aid Abiola's presidential campaign and election in 1993. Even while he served as editor of Sunday Concord, Alake was in the thick of the electioneering campaign which paved the way for the eventual electoral victory of the business magnate, M.K.O. Abiola, in the controversial 12 June 1993 Presidential Election in Nigeria. in the wake of the arbitrary cancellation of the presidential election result, Alake was terrorised and tormented by the oppressive junta of Late General Sani Abacha for his candour and daring in pressing for the disannulment of the 12 June 1993 Presidential Election. Alake subsequently went into exile where he identified and joined forces with other patriots like Senator Bola Tinubu, Lt. Gen. Ipoola Alani Akinrinade (Rtd), Professor Bolaji Akinyemi, Chief John Oyegun and other chieftains of the National Democratic Coalition of Nigeria, NADECO. From there, Alake kept up the grim battle for the restoration of democracy. He made a return to Nigeria in 1995 when the Concord Press was re-opened.

In June 1999, Alake was named Special Adviser on Information and Strategy to the Lagos State Governor, Senator Bola Tinubu. On 6 October 1999, Alake became the State Commissioner for Information and Strategy subsequent to the reversion of the former Bureau of Information and Strategy to ministerial status. He held this position and acquitted himself creditably till 2007. Before his appointment to lead the Lagos State Information machinery, the ministry was Ministry of Information, Sports and Culture. Alake on assumption of office sought and obtained the governor's approval to change the ministry of Information and Strategy, dispensing with culture and sports to make the ministry more relevant and dynamic to confront the challenges of modern Information management in an emergent democracy. Alake thus became the first Information and strategy commissioner in the annals of Nigeria.

In 2010, Alake revealed his intention to contest the senatorial seat of Ekiti Central in Ekiti State. However his political aspiration was cut short by intra-party crisis which made him to quit the senatorial race.

Recently Alake was wrongly featured in a news item in Nigeria in which it was reported that a traditional ruler had attempted to kill a certain Dele Alake. Following the confusion caused by the story, Dele Alake made a statement refuting the news story and asked all the news organisations that reported the story to publish a retraction.

He was appointed minister of Solid Minerals Development by President Bola Tinubu on 16 August 2023.

== Awards and associations ==
Alake is a former vice-president of the Nigerian Guild of Editors. He belongs to several national, regional and international professional bodies such as the Nigeria Union of Journalists (NUJ), West African Union of Journalists. He has also received several honour and awards for his meritorious service in journalism. He was awarded the Economic Community for West African States (ECOWAS) International Gold Award in 2000, Special Recognition Award, Radio Lagos and Public Service Award, ECHNONEWS amongst others. He was a former chairman Lagos State Broadcasting Corporation Chapel of the N.U.J and is currently a Fellow of the Nigerian Guild of Editors (E.N.G.E).
