= Joseph Utsev =

Nigerian politician

Joseph Terlumun Utsev

Federal Ministry of Water Resources and Sanitation
- President: Bola Tinubu
- Vice President: Kashim Shettima

Personal details
- Born: 2 December 1980 (44 years)
- Education: PhD
- Alma mater: University of Nigeria, University of Agriculture, Makurdi

Joseph Utsev is a Nigerian politician who hails from Buruku Local Government Area of Benue State in Nigeria. He is currently the Minister of Water Resources and Sanitation of Nigeria.

== Early life and education ==
Utsev was born on 2 December 1980 in Benue State, Nigeria. He is a graduate from Federal University of Agriculture, Makurdi where he obtained a Bachelor of Engineering degree in civil engineering, graduating with a Second Class Honour “Upper Division” in the year 2004. He also obtained a masters and PhD degree in Water Resources and Environmental Engineering from the University of Nigeria, Nsukka in the years 2007 and 2011.

== Career life ==
Utsev was appointed by President Bola Tinubu as the minister of water resources and sanitation, Federal Republic of Nigeria. Joseph Utsev is also a lecturer and a professor.

In 2017, he also served as the commissioner of Ministry of Water Resources and Environment in Benue State.

In 2024, Utsev was recognized by the Africa Water Conservation Platform (AWCP) for his leadership in managing water resources, ensuring equitable distribution, and promoting sustainable practices.
