= Yusuf Sununu =

Nigerian politician (born 1967)

Yusuf Tanko Sununu

Member of the House of Representatives
- In office 2023–2027
- Constituency: Yauri/Shanga/Ngaski

Personal details
- Born: 1967 (age 58–59) Kebbi State, Nigeria
- Party: All Progressives Congress
- Occupation: Politician

Yusuf Tanko Sununu (born 2 February 1967 in Kebbi State) is a Nigerian politician from the All Progressives Congress. On 21 August 2023 he was appointed Minister of State for Education in the Cabinet of Bola Tinubu. Sununu represents Yauri/Shanga/Ngaski Federal Constituency in the National Assembly.
