= Hannatu Musawa =

Nigerian politician and minister (born 1974)

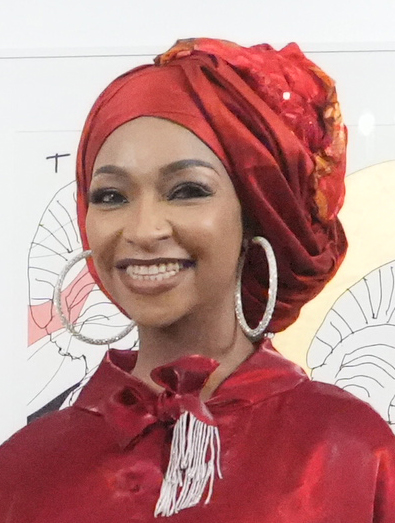

Minister of Art, Culture and the Creative Economy
- Incumbent
- Assumed office 16 August 2023
- President: Bola Tinubu
- Preceded by: position established

Personal details
- Born: 1 November 1974 (age 51)
- Party: All Progressives Congress
- Spouse: Abdul Samad Rabiu (divorced)
- Parent: Musa Musawa (father)
- Education: University of Cardiff; University of Aberdeen
- Occupation: Lawyer, politician

Hannatu Musa Musawa (born 1 November 1974) is a Nigerian lawyer, politician, and author who has served as the Minister of Art, Culture, Tourism and Creative Economy since 2023. She is from Katsina State in northern Nigeria and is of Hausa and Fulani origins.

== Early life and education ==
Musawa is the daughter of Musa Musawa, a member of the social liberal First Republic party, Northern Elements Progressive Union, and its successor in the Second Republic, Peoples Redemption Party.

Musawa obtained her undergraduate degree in law from the Cardiff University in the United Kingdom. She then pursued a postgraduate Master’s Degree in Oil & Gas from the University of Aberdeen.

== Career ==
Musawa has had a varied and successful career in different fields. She has worked as a lawyer in private companies, providing legal counsel and representation in various matters. She has also specialised in marine affairs and oil & gas law.

She was appointed by President Bola Tinubu in 2023, after serving as his special adviser on culture and entertainment economy. She oversees the promotion and development of the creative sector in Nigeria, as well as the preservation and display of the country's cultural heritage.

== Political engagement ==
Musawa has been involved in Nigerian political affairs, both as a candidate and an activist. She contested for a legislative seat in the federal House of Representatives, aiming to serve her constituency and the public. She also served as a lawyer on the prosecution team in the 2003 presidential election petition involving Muhammadu Buhari and Olusegun Obasanjo.

On altering Muslim–Muslim ticket, or removing a Northern Muslim from President Bola Tinubu’s re-election ticket, Musawa warned that APC could weaken its chances in the 2027 general election.
