= Federal Polytechnic, Ado-Ekiti =

Tertiary institution in Ado-Ekiti, Nigeria

Coordinates: 7.592927°N 5.291924°E

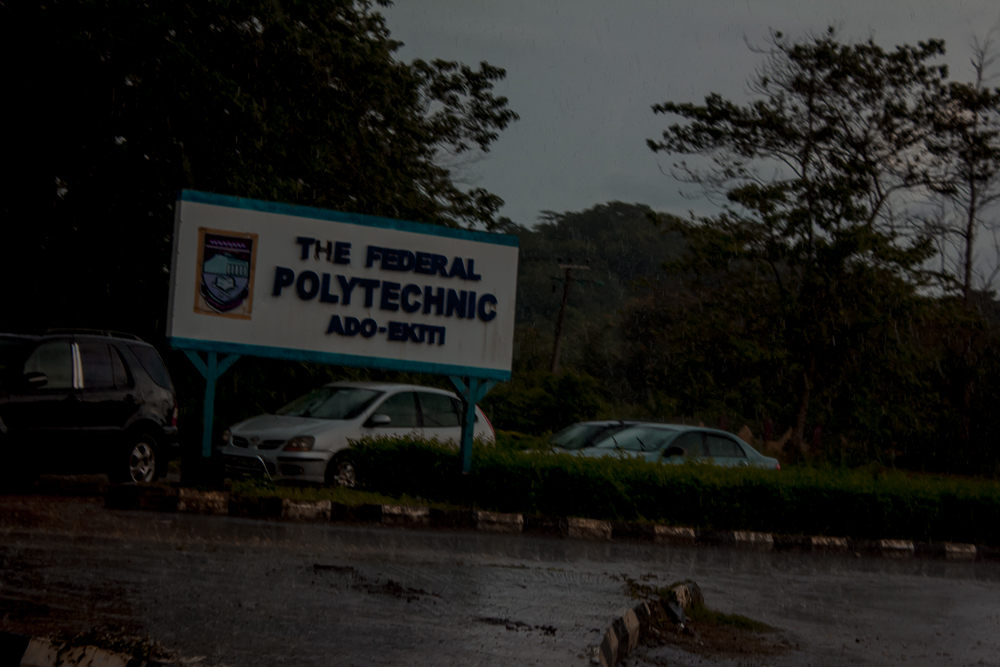
The Federal Polytechnic Ado ekiti

Federal Polytechnic, Ado-Ekiti is a Polytechnic in Ado Ekiti, Ekiti State, Nigeria. The current Rector is Engr. Dr Temitope John Alake. The school is located along Ijan Ekiti road, in Ado-Ekiti, Ekiti State, Nigeria.

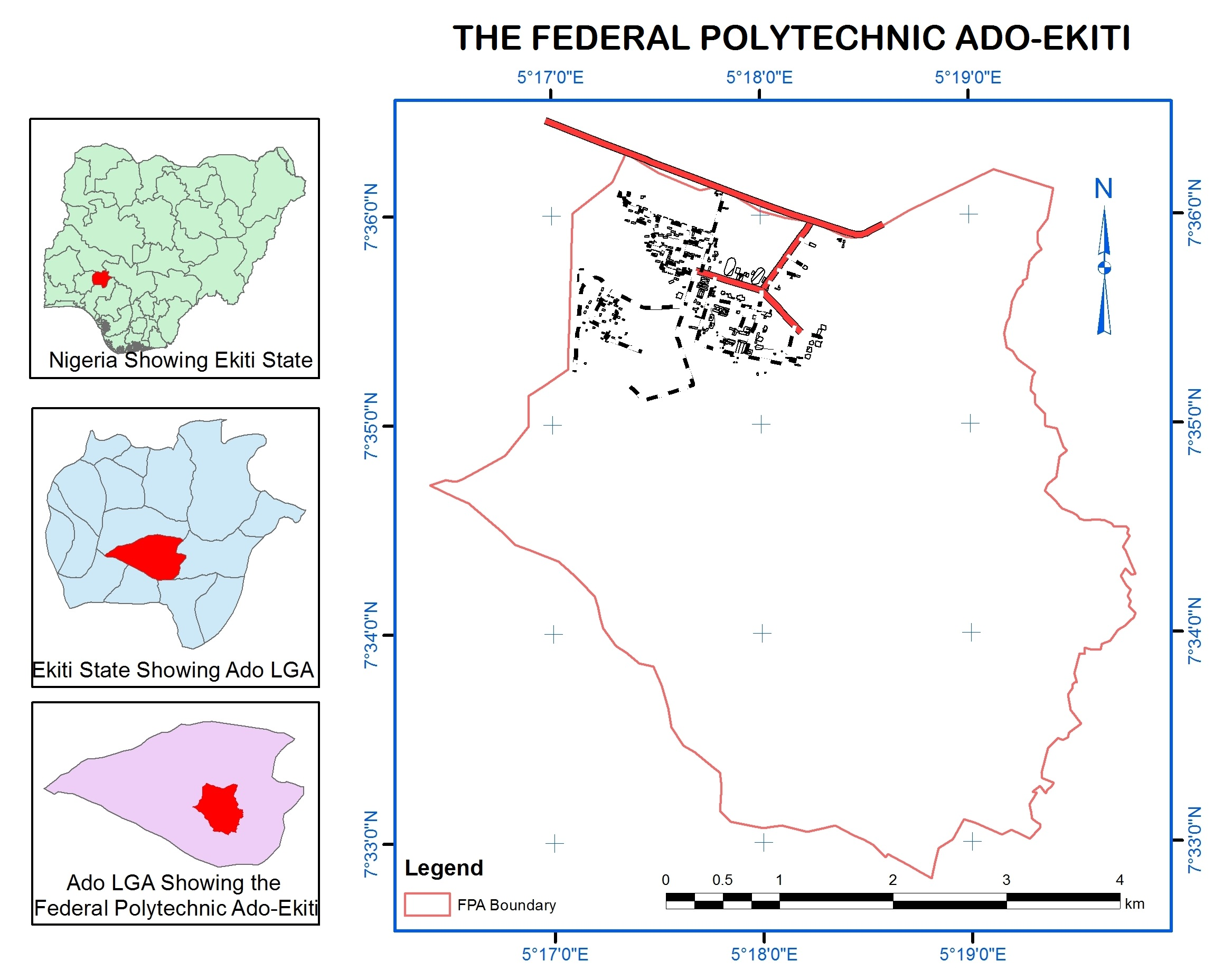
The Federal Polytechnic Ado-Ekiti

== Academics ==
Federal Polytechnic offers National Diploma and Higher National Diploma, certificate and professional programmes in: architectural technology, urban and regional planning, surveying and geoinformatics, quantity surveying, civil engineering technology, mineral resources and engineering technology, mechanical engineering technology, electrical electronics engineering, computer science, science laboratory technology, glass/ceramics technology, food technology, statistics, Marketing, Accountancy, Banking and Finance, Business Administration and Management, Estate Management, and Office Technology and Management. There are five schools: Business Studies, Engineering, Environmental Studies, Science and Computer Studies, and the newly established School of Agriculture and Agricultural Technology.

== History ==
The institution opened in January 1977 in Jos, Plateau State, as a college of technology with 350 National Diploma students. The following year it was relocated by the government to Akure, Ondo State, and in 1979 became a polytechnic. In 1982 it was moved again to Ado Ekiti, Akure becoming the location of the Federal University of Technology. As of 2016 it had more than 10,000 full- and part-time students and approximately 1,500 staff.

According to the rector, the institution has for years had problems with the destruction of agricultural facilities by herders.

In 2015 and 2016 staff at Federal Polytechnic went on strike over a reclassification that reduced their salaries and accusations of corruption. On 8 October 2017 the institution was closed indefinitely after either one or two students were reported to have died, possibly of malaria, and students rioted, destroyed property, and burned down the health centre. The institution is currently opened and academic activities are ongoing smoothly.

== Mission ==
To train and develop self-reliant manpower for Sustainable technological development

== Vision ==
A technological institution disseminating qualitative and Practical knowledge for meaningful contribution to local And national technological development

== National Mission For Polytechnic Education In Nigeria ==
The mission of Polytechnic Education is to produce knowledgeable and innovative graduates, worthy in character and public service for the technological advancement of the country

== Gallery ==
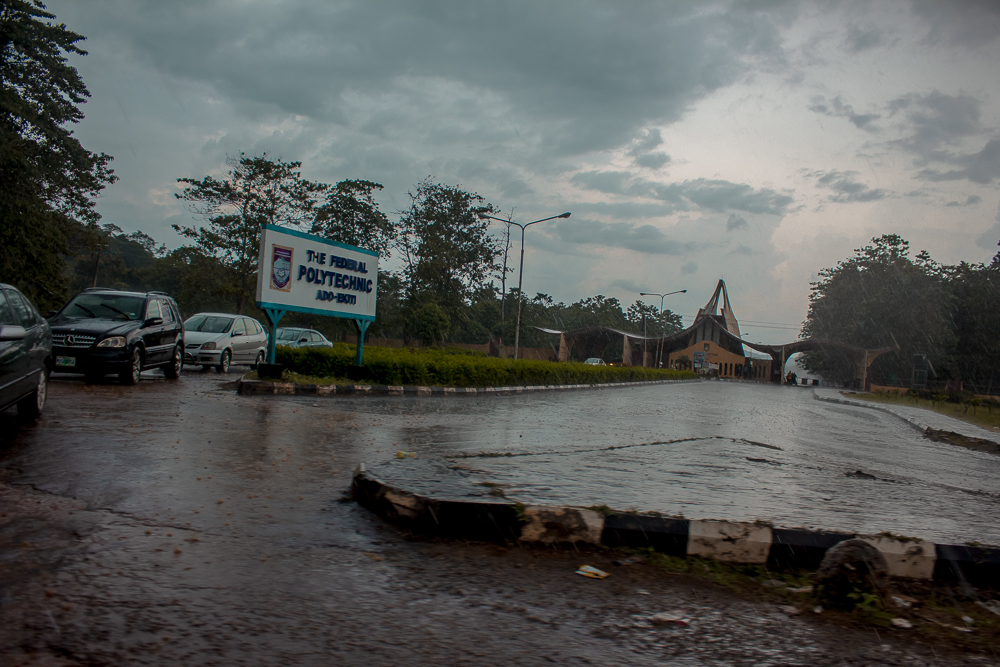
The Federal Polytechnic Ado ekiti

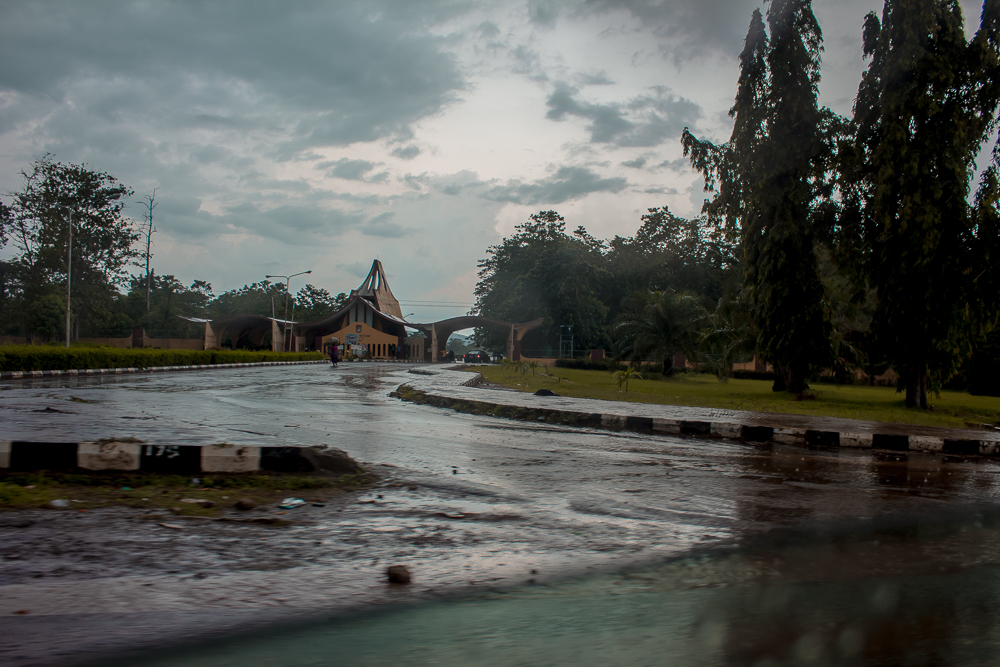
