= Shuaibu Audu =

Nigerian politician and banker (born 1980)

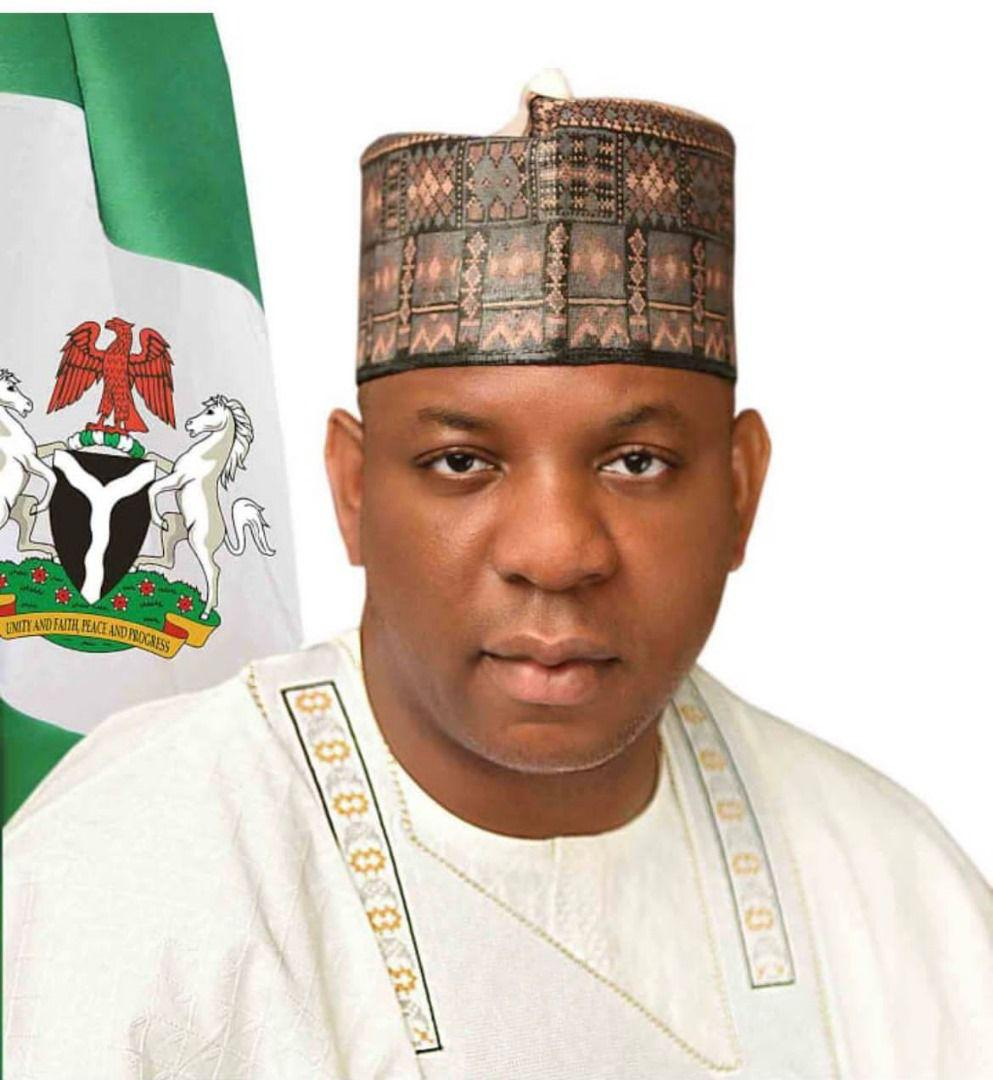
- Shuaibu Audu

Minister of Steel Development
- Incumbent
- Assumed office 21 August 2023
- President: Bola Tinubu
- Minister of State: Uba Maigari Ahmadu
- Preceded by: Olamilekan Adegbite

Personal details
- Born: Shuaibu Abubakar Audu; 6 November 1980 (age 45) Lokoja, Kwara State (now in Kogi State), Nigeria
- Party: All Progressives Congress
- Parent: Abubakar Audu (father)
- Education: University of Leicester; Henley Business School; St Hugh's College, Oxford
- Occupation: Politician; investment banker

Prince Shuaibu Abubakar Audu (born 6 November 1980) is a Nigerian investment banker and politician who is the current minister of Steel Development since August 2023.

Before his appointment as minister, he was a gubernatorial aspirant in Kogi State. Following the submission and subsequent screening of ministerial nominees by the senate, Audu was appointed minister of Steel Development on 21 August 2023.

== Early life and education ==
Prince Shuaibu Abubakar Audu was born to the Late Prince Abubakar Audu in Kogi. He holds a Bachelor's Degree in Business Economics from the University of Leicester, in the United Kingdom, earned in 2001. He earned a Master's Degree (M.Sc.) in International Securities, Investment, and Banking (ISIB) from Henley Business School, University of Reading. Audu also obtained a Masters in Business Administration (MBA) from the University of Oxford in 2013, where he was a member of St. Hugh's College.

== Professional career ==
Prince Shuaibu Abubakar Audu has over 20 years of experience in Corporate and Investment Banking and Wealth Management within the Financial Services Sector.

He started his career at the then - Investment Banking and Trust Company Limited ("IBTC") in the Global Markets and Treasury Department for two (2) years within the Corporate & Investment Banking Division. He then moved to Stanbic IBTC Pension Managers Limited as one of the pioneer promoters, and together with his colleagues in the Banking Group, they set up the Pension Fund Administrator ("PFA"), which is currently the largest in Nigeria. They equally set up the Investment Management Desk, and he was later appointed as an Executive Director in the Asset Management Subsidiary.

In 2013–2023, Prince Shuaibu Abubakar Audu became the chief executive officer of the Venture Capital Business at Stanbic IBTC Group. He has worked and garnered experience at various banks, including the Bank of New York Melon in Boston, Massachusetts, USA, and Credit Suisse Global Headquarters in Zurich, Switzerland, amongst others.

=== Politics (2023) ===
Sequel to his vast experience in the private sector over the years, Prince Shuaibu Abubakar Audu decided to bring his experience to bear in governance by showing interest in politics.

He participated in the recently concluded governorship primary election in Kogi State in April 2023 under the All Progressives Congress ("APC") before his appointment to the office of the Honourable Minister of Steel Development by President Bola Ahmed Tinubu GCFR on August 21, 2023.

== Personal life ==
Shuaibu Audu is the son of former Kogi State Governor, Abubakar Audu. He is married with children.
