= Nigerian Ministry of Youth and Sports =

Nigerian government ministry

Federal Ministry of Youth Development
- Coat of arms of Nigeria

Agency overview
- Jurisdiction: Government of Nigeria
- Headquarters: Federal Secretariat Abuja
- Minister responsible: Ayodele Olawande
- Website: fmyd.gov.ng

The Federal Ministry of Youth Development is a Nigerian government ministry responsible for youth affairs, including the formulation and implementation of the national youth policy, youth development programmes, funding of youth initiatives, enterprise development, vocational skills and training, youth engagement, employment, education, and the promotion of youth participation. It also oversees the National Youth Service Corps (NYSC) and the Citizenship and Leadership Training Centre.

The ministry was previously formed through a merger of the Federal Ministry of Youth Development (FMYD) and the National Sports Commission (NSC), following a proclamation by President Muhammadu Buhari on 11 November 2016, as part of the restructuring of ministries, departments, and agencies (MDAs) of the government. It was later separated from the Federal Ministry of Sports by President Bola Tinubu, restoring its independent focus on youth development.

== The ministers ==
The incumbent Federal Minister of Youth Development is Ayodele Olawande.

The mandate of the Federal Ministry of Youth and Sport Development is the "formulation, implementation, monitoring and evaluation of policies and programmes on youths and sports development towards wealth creation, youth empowerment, physical fitness and well-being, achieving excellence in sports, national unity and sustainable development".

== National Sports Commission ==
The National Sports Commission is the Nigerian apex body responsible for regulating sports in the country, with Alhassan Yakmut serving as the last Director-General before it was scrapped by the Muhammadu Buhari government in 2015. It is headed by the minister of sports. Its origin dates back to 1910 with the creation of the Empire Day competition.

=== Name changes ===
- National Sports Council (1962–1963)
- Ministry of Labour (1964–1971)
- National Sports Commission (1971–1975)
- Ministry of Social Development, Youth and Sports (1975–1979)
- Ministry of Youth and Culture (1979–1982)
- Ministry of Youth, Sport and Culture (1982–1990)
- Ministry of Youth and Sports (1990–1992)
- National Sports Commission (1992–1995)
- Ministry of Youth and Sports (1995–1999)
- Ministry of Sports and Social Development (1999–2007)
- National Sports Commission (2007–2015)
- Federal Ministry of Youth Development (2023)
- Federal Ministry of Sport (2023)

=== Some notable moments ===
- Nigeria participated in an international sporting event for the first time at 1934 Common Wealth and Empire Day Games held in London.
- Nigeria first contingent participation in 1950 Commonwealth Games, 1952 Olympics in Finland and 1965 All African Games in Brazzaville, Congo
- National Sports Council was established in 1962, as a parastatal under the Federal Ministry of Labour
- Became established as the National Sports Commission in 1971 (by the Federal Military Government Decree 34 of 1971)
- In 1975, Nigeria had her first Minister for Youth and Sports
- In 1995, the National Sport Commission was dissolved and replaced by the Ministry of Youth and Sports.
- In 2007, the Ministry for Sport and Social Development was again dissolved and replaced with the National Sports Commission.

== See also ==
- Youth in Nigeria
- Nigeria Youth SDGs Network also known as the Network of Youth for Sustainable Initiative
- Sports in Nigeria
- Nigerian Football Association
- Nigerian Basketball Association
