= Uba Maigari Ahmadu =

Nigerian politician

Minister of State for Regional Development
- Incumbent
- Assumed office 2025
- President: Bola Tinubu

Personal details
- Education: University of Maiduguri

Uba Maigari Ahmadu is a lawyer by profession who hails from Wukari Local Government Area in Taraba State in Nigeria. He was currently appointed by President Bola Tinubu as the Minister of State for Regional Development. He previously served as the Minister of State, Ministry of Steel Development.

== Early life and education ==
Uba Maigari Ahmadu hails from ukari Local Government Area in Taraba State in Nigeria. in 1988, Uba Maigari Ahmadu obtained a second-class honours in common law in University of Maiduguri.

== Career ==
Uba Maigari Ahmadu is a lawyer by profession and is currently serving as the Minister of State for Regional Development. Prior to this appointment by President Bola Tinubu, Uba Maigari Ahmadu had a distinguished career in public service. He served as the Deputy Governor of Taraba State under the platform of the Peoples Democratic Party (PDP) from 1999 to 2007. From 2012 to 2015, he was appointed by then-President Goodluck Ebele Jonathan as a board member of the Federal Road Maintenance Agency (FERMA). President Bola Tinubu appointed Maigari Minister of State for Steel Development which his tenure expires in 2024 and was later redeployed to minister of State for regional development where he is currently working. while Uba Maigari Ahmadu was serving as the Minister of State Steel Development, he was honoured for his service and the event was planned by Prime Next Logistics, Goldmine Global Services Ltd and ATREX Global Procurement Company Ltd in collaboration with its business partners, took place at the Blu Cabanna in Abuja.
