= Lola Ade-John =

Nigeria Minister of Tourism

Minister of Tourism
- In office 21 August 2023 – 23 October 2024
- President: Bola Tinubu

Personal details
- Education: University of Ibadan

Lola Ade-John is a Nigerian information and technology expert, banker, and a former Minister of Tourism.

== Education ==
Lola Ade-John studied computer science at the University of Ibadan where she graduated in 1984. She also holds a master's degree from the same field and the same institution.

== Career ==
After her graduation from the university, Ade-John worked with Shell Petroleum as a systems analyst. Then she proceeded to work with Magnum Trust Bank, Access Bank, United Bank for Africa and Ecobank. After her time in the banking sector, she set up Novateur Business Technology Consultants in 2013.

On 16 August 2023, she was appointed Minister of Tourism by President Bola Tinubu. She assumed office on 21 August 2023.

Unfortunately, her position as the Minister of Tourism was cut abruptly after being dismissed from office in October 2024 by the President alongside four other ministers.
