= Niger Delta River Basin Development Authority =

- Type: Government Service Organization
- Industry: Water
- Founded: 3 August 1996
- Headquarters: Rivers State; Bayelsa State, Delta State, Nigeria
- Products: Water and Irrigation management
- Website: https://nigerdeltabasin.gov.ng/

The Niger Delta River Basin Development Authority, otherwise known as Niger Delta Basin Development Authority (NDBDA) is one of the twelve river basin development authorities in Nigeria. The authority was established through Decree No. 37 of 3 August 1996 and this was made possible following the establishment of Decree No 25 of 15 June 1976 which instituted and recognized the establishment River Basin Development Authorities in Nigeria to harness Nigeria's water resource potentials for multiple uses. The NDBDA is headed by a managing director who also act as the Chief Executive and Financial Officer of the Authority. The managing Director is supported by other executive directors responsible for different areas of the Authority, including planning and Design, Administration and Finance, Engineering and Agricultural Services.

The Niger Delta Basin Development Authority, a parastatal under the supervision of the Federal Ministry of Water Resources, has its headquarters in Port Harcourt, the capital city of Rivers State. The boundaries of the NDBDA include Rivers State, Bayelsa State and 18 Local Government Areas of Delta State.

== History ==
The Niger Delta Basin Development Authority came into effect following the promulgation of Decree No 37 of 3 August 1976. However, modification was made regarding the boundaries of the Authority through the re-adjusted Decree No 35 of 1987 which increased the boundaries of the Authority to include eighteen (18) Local Areas in Delta State. In 1988, the Federal Government of Nigeria, through Decree No 25 of 1988, partially commercialized the authority and narrowed the activities of the authority to include the development of the Water Resources potentials of its catchment areas.

== Core Objectives ==
The core objectives of the authority as stipulated in section 4 of Decree No 35 of 1987 include:

- Development of both surface and underground water resources.
- The provision of Irrigation Infrastructure. Control of flood.
- Development of a comprehensive water resources masterplan.
- Collection of data on water (level) flow, rainfall and wind(Hydro-meteorological data collection.
- Ensure water quality management (pollution monitoring and evaluation)
- Widening the waterways, dredge sited canals (Canalization) and improvement of waterway.
- Preventing waste/loss of farm land by flood, wind and seawater(Erosion).
