= Ministry of Mines and Steel Development (Nigeria) =

Geological Survey Agency in Nigeria

The Mines and Steel Development Ministry is a Nigerian ministry established in 1985 to encourage development of the country's solid mineral resources. The Ministry formulates policy, provides information on mining potential and production, regulates operations and generates revenue for the government. Operational departments include Mining cadastre (records of mine locations, ownership etc.), Geological survey of Nigeria, Mines inspectorate, Artisanal and small-scale mining and Mining environment.

== Organisation ==
The Ministry is directed by a Federal Minister and by a Minister of State, both appointed by the President. A Permanent Secretary, who is a career civil servant, assists the Ministers. The Permanent Secretary is responsible for day-to-day operations and for implementation of policy changes. As of December 2009, the Permanent Secretary was Suleiman D. Kassim.

Minister	Minister of State	Term Start	Term End
Leslye Obiora		2006	2007
Sarafa A. Tunji Ishola		July 2007	October 2008
Diezani Allison-Madueke	Ahmed Mohamed Gusau	December 2008	17 March 2010
Musa Mohammed Sada		6 April 2010	29 May 2015
Kayode Fayemi	Abubakar Bawa Bwari	11 November 2015	30 May 2018
Abubakar Bawa Bwari		30 May 2018	28 May 2019
Olamilekan Adegbite	Uchechukwu Sampson Ogah	21 August 2019	29 May 2023
Shuaibu Audu	Uba Maigari Ahmadu	21 August 2023	

== Geological Survey Agency ==
Nigerian Geological Survey Agency

Government overview
- Formed: 1919
- Jurisdiction: Nigeria
- Headquarters: Shettima A. Munguno Crescent, Behind Julius Berger Headquarters, Utako District, Abuja FCT, Nigeria
- Government executive: Abdulrazaq A. Garba, MD/CEO
- Parent department: Ministry of Mines and Steel Development
- Website: https://ngsa.gov.ng

The Nigerian Geological Survey Agency is a Nigerian government agency specialising in the geology and earth sciences of Nigeria. It falls under the Federal Ministry of Mines and Steel Development. It was created by the Nigerian Geological Survey Establishment Act of 2006, and is a successor to the Geological Survey of Nigeria, which was established in 1919 after the unification of the Northern Nigeria and the Southern Nigeria Protectorates.

=== Activities ===
Activities of the agency include:

- geological mapping
- mineral exploration and evaluation
- drilling and technical services
- hydrogeological research
- engineering geological research
- geochemical mapping

It has a subsidiary, NGSA Consult Ltd, which provides consultancy services.

== See also ==
- Nigerian Civil Service
- Federal Ministries of Nigeria
