= Federal Ministry of Labour and Employment (Nigeria) =

Nigerian Federal Ministry

The Federal Ministry of Labour and Employment is the Nigerian Federal Ministry concerned with relations between workers and employers. It is headed by the Minister of Labour and Employment, who is appointed by the President, and is assisted by a Permanent Secretary, who is a career civil servant.

The current minister is Muhammadu Maigari Dingyadi as minister of Labour and Employment and Nkiruka Onyejeocha as the minister of State for Labour and Employment.

Hassan Muhammed Lawal was appointed Minister of Labour in 2003, and was reappointed by President Umaru Yar'Adua in July 2007. He was moved to the Ministry of Works and Housing and replaced by Adetokunbo Kayode in December 2008. Kayode had previously been Minister for Tourism, Culture and National Orientation. Chief Emeka Wogu was then appointed Minister of Labour and Productivity in 2010. The Permanent Secretary in December 2009 was Dr. Haruna Usman Sanusi.

== History ==
The Federal Ministry of Labour and Productivity has been in existence (with different names) since 1939, with the central purpose of ensuring cordial relations between workers and employers in the public and private sectors. The body was created after the start of World War II to coordinate resources for war efforts, with first one and then two Labour Inspectors attached to the Governor's Office. With growing worker agitation over cost Of living allowances, the Department of Labour was established on 1 October 1942. It was headed by a Commissioner and two Labour Officers, and was charged with dealing with labour movement issues, ensuring the orderly development of Industrial Relations and enforcing protective legislations. The organization grew as the war progressed, with offices opened in the industrial centers of Enugu, Kaduna and Lagos. Later a Ministry of Labour was created in addition to the Department of Labour, and the two were merged on 1 April 1958. After Independence in 1960, the Ministry has grown steadily, renamed the Federal Ministry of Employment Labour and Productivity in 1979 and the Ministry of Labour in January 2007.

== Organization ==
The outward-facing divisions the Ministry of Labour are Trade Union Services and Industrial Relations; Employment and Wages and Inspectorate. The Trade Union Services Division formulates policies on trade union organizations and manages disputes and complaints. It also assists in worker's education, and keeps records on trade unions and their activities. Internally oriented departments are Human Resources; Finance and Supplies; Policy, Analysis, Research & Statistics.

The Ministry is responsible for several parastatals (government-owned agencies): Michael Imoudu National Institute For Labour Studies (MINILS), Nigerian Social Insurance Trust Fund (NSITF), National Directorate of Employment (NDE), National Productivity Center (NPC), National Industrial Court and Industrial Arbitration Panel (IAP).

=== Michael Imoudu National Institute for Labour Studies ===
Michael Imoudu National Institute for Labour Studies
- Motto: Excellence in Labour Education
- Established: 1986
- Director-General: Alhaji Saliu lsiaq-Alabi
- Location: KM 7, Ajase Ipo Road, PMB 1524, Ilorin, Nigeria, Ilorin, Kwara State, Nigeria
- Website: minils.gov.ng

Michael Imoudu National Institute for Labour Studies (MINILS) is a government-owned labour institute established in 1986 in Ilorin, Nigeria. It is one of the statutory bodies managed by the Federal Ministry of Labour.

Named after popular labour leader, Michael Imoudu, who started his labour activities as a member of the Railway Workers Union during the colonial era, MINILS is an arm of the Federal Ministry of Labour.

MINILS is headed by the Director-General, Comrade Issa Aremu mni.

Besides regular courses, the institute also collaborates with stakeholders to train staff at various quarters on labour relations.

The idea of a state initiated and centralized center to educate labour union members gained traction during the Third National Development Plan (1975 - 1980). This proposition came after the military government proscribed the two major union founded labour training centers: the pro-west Trade Union Institute for Economic and Social Development managed by the African-American Labour Center in partnership with Nigerian led United Labour Congress and the left leaning Lumumba Labour Institute. The democratic government of Shehu Shagari (1979 - 1983) built on the earlier initiatives and began planning for a training institute to be located at Ilorin in 1983. In 1986, a decree establishing the National Institute of Labour Studies was enacted, the new legislation placed made it a statutory center within the Federal Ministry of Employment, Labour and Productivity. This decree was replaced in 1990 by Act Cap 261 and two years later to honor labour activist and leader of the 1945 general strike, Michael Imoudu, the institute's named was changed to Michael Imoudu National Institute for Labour Studies.

The main aims of the institute is to promote capacity building of workers and best practices and harmony in relationships between labour unions and management. This is achieved through research and collaboration with tertiary institutions within the country, consultancy, seminars, conferences, lectures on labour union administration, provision of grants to scholars and publication of journals and working papers.

The institute has an annual summit attended by stakeholders of MINILS and labour matters.

To promote its mission of capacity building, certificate and diploma awarding courses were established at the institute, in addition, focus on communications and information technology training has led to the construction of a dedicated center for ICT.

MINILS programmes are offered both on full and part-time basis that award Professional Certificate In Industrial And Labour Relations (PCILR), National Diplomas at main campus, its distant learning centres, as well as on e-learning platform.

== List of ministers ==
List of Ministers
Image	Minister	Tenure	Citation
Minister of Labour and Welfare
	Samuel Ladoke Akintola	1951–1954	
	Festus Okotie-Eboh	1954–1957	
	Joseph Modupe Johnson	1959–1964	
	Adeleke Adedoyin	1965–1966	
Federal Commissioner for Labour
	Anthony Enahoro	6 July 1967 – 1975	
	Henry Adefope	1975–July 1978	
	Silvanus Olatunde Williams	1978–1979	
Federal Minister of Employment, Labour and Productivity
	Samuel Adebisi Ogedengbe	December 1979 – February 1982	
	Emmanuel Osammor	February 1982 – October 1983	
	Ali Baba	1984	
	Solomon Kikiowo Omojokun	1984–1985	
	Patrick Koshoni	1985–1986	
	Ike Nwachukwu	– 21 December 1987	
	Abubakar Umar	21 December 1987 –	
	Bunu Sheriff Musa		
Minister of Labour and Productivity
	Bola Afonja	August 1993 – 17 November 1993	
	Francis John Ellah	1993–1995	
	Mohammed Uba Ahmed	1995–1998	
	Emmanuel Onyemaechi Udogu	1998–1999	
	Alabo Graham-Douglas	June 1999 – June 2000	
	Musa Gwadabe	3 June 2000 –	
	Hussaini Akwanga	– 4 December 2003 (sacked)	
	Hassan Muhammed Lawal	2004 – 17 December 2008	
	Adetokunbo Kayode	17 December 2008 – 10 February 2010	
	Ibrahim Kazaure	10 February 2010 – 17 March 2010	
	Chukwuemeka Wogu	6 April 2010 – 15 October 2014 (resigned)	
	Kabiru Tanimu Turaki (supervising minister)	22 October 2014 – 2015	
	Joel Danlami Ikenya	17 March 2015 – 2015	
	Chris Ngige	11 November 2015 – 29 May 2023	
	Simon Lalong	21 August 2023 – 19 December 2023 (resigned)	
	Muhammadu Maigari Dingyadi	4 November 2024 - (incumbent)	

== See also ==
- Federal Ministries of Nigeria
- Nigerian Civil Service
