= Nigerian National Assembly delegation from Sokoto =

Sokoto's delegation in Nigeria's National Assembly

The Nigerian National Assembly delegation from Sokoto comprises three Senators representing Sokoto North, Sokoto East, and Sokoto West, and eleven Representatives representing Sokoto North/Sokoto South, Binji/Silame, Wurno/Rabah, Isa/Sabon-Birni, Gwadabawa/Illela, Kware/Wamakko, Gudu/Tangaza, Kebbe/Tambuwal, Goronyo/Gada, Bodinga/Dange-Shuni/Tureta, and Shagari/Yabo.

== Third Nigerian Republic ==
During the Third Nigerian Republic, Sokoto State was composed of present day Sokoto and present day Zamfara States.

Senators during the Third Nigerian Republic from Sokoto StateMembers of the House of Representatives during the Third Nigerian Republic from Sokoto State
Senator	Elected	Party	Constituency	Term
Landan Abdullahi Shhuni	4 July 1992	NRC	Sokoto South	5 December 1992 – 17 November 1993
Saidu M. Idirisu	4 July 1992	NRC	Sokoto East	5 December 1992 – 17 November 1993
Garba Ilah Gada	4 July 1992	NRC	Sokoto North	5 December 1992 – 17 November 1993
Member	Elected	Party	Constituency	Term!
Abdullahi A. A. Zurmi	4 July 1992	NRC	Zurmi	5 December 1992 – 17 November 1993
Mohammed Dan-Ige Yabo	4 July 1992	NRC	Yabo	5 December 1992 – 17 November 1993
Bala Aminu Alhaji	4 July 1992	NRC	Sokoto	5 December 1992 – 17 November 1993
Muhammadu Maikudi Kaya	4 July 1992	NRC	Maradun	5 December 1992 – 17 November 1993
Bala Umar Mahe	4 July 1992	NRC	Kaura-Namoda	5 December 1992 – 17 November 1993
Haruna Dauda Sabon-Birni	4 July 1992	NRC	Sabon Birni	5 December 1992 – 17 November 1993
Abdullahi Mohammed Binji	4 July 1992	NRC	Binji	5 December 1992 – 17 November 1993
Abdulkadir Kado Mayaura Gusau	4 July 1992	NRC	Gusau	5 December 1992 – 17 November 1993
Muhammed Usman	4 July 1992	NRC	Bukkuyum	5 December 1992 – 17 November 1993
Abubakar Aliya Gumbi	4 July 1992	NRC	Wammako	5 December 1992 – 17 November 1993
Nahuce M. Abdullarim	4 July 1992	NRC	Bungudu	5 December 1992 – 17 November 1993
Umaru Yakubu Maru	4 July 1992	NRC	Anka	5 December 1992 – 17 November 1993
Usman Abdullahi Illela	4 July 1992	NRC	Illela	5 December 1992 – 17 November 1993
Abdullahi Waziri Tambuwal	4 July 1992	NRC	Tambuwal	5 December 1992 – 17 November 1993
Mwazu Ahmed	4 July 1992	NRC	Bakura	5 December 1992 – 17 November 1993
Shehu Labaran	4 July 1992	NRC	Gwadabawa	5 December 1992 – 17 November 1993
Umaru Sa'idu Gada	4 July 1992	NRC	Gada	5 December 1992 – 17 November 1993
Atiku Liman Gande	4 July 1992	NRC	Silame	5 December 1992 – 17 November 1993
Bello Mode	4 July 1992	NRC	Kware	5 December 1992 – 17 November 1993
Ikra Aliyu	4 July 1992	NRC	Tsafe	5 December 1992 – 17 November 1993
Aliyu Shehu Achida	4 July 1992	NRC	Wurno/Achida	5 December 1992 – 17 November 1993
Muhammed A. Abubakar Mafara	4 July 1992	NRC	Talata Mafara	5 December 1992 – 17 November 1993
Garba Mode Gidan Madi	4 July 1992	NRC	Tangaza	5 December 1992 – 17 November 1993
Abubakar Hagiru Dange	4 July 1992	NRC	Dangeshuni	5 December 1992 – 17 November 1993
Suleman Adamu	4 July 1992	NRC	Gummi	5 December 1992 – 17 November 1993
Musa Usman	4 July 1992	NRC	Goronyo	5 December 1992 – 17 November 1993
Yusuf Muazu Darhela	4 July 1992	NRC	—	5 December 1992 – 17 November 1993
A. Bello Tudu Isa	4 July 1992	NRC	Isa	5 December 1992 – 17 November 1993
Aliyu Mohammed	4 July 1992	NRC	Rabah	5 December 1992 – 17 November 1993

== Fourth Nigerian Republic ==
=== 9th Assembly (2019–2023) ===
Senator	Constituency	Party
Aliyu Magatakarda Wamakko	Sokoto North	APC
Abdullahi Ibrahim Gobir	Sokoto East	APC
Ibrahim Abdullahi Danbaba	Sokoto South	APC

=== The 4th Parliament (1999–2003) ===
OFFICE	NAME	PARTY	CONSTITUENCY	TERM
Senator	Abubakar III AliyuMai Sango	ANPP	Sokoto North	1999–2003
Senator	Gada BelloJibril	ANPP	Sokoto East	1999–2003
Senator	Wali Abdallah	PDP	Sokoto South	1999–2003
Representative	Ismaila Usman Balarabe	ANPP	Sokoto North/Sokoto South	1999–2003
Representative	Mukhtar Dikko	ANPP	Binji/Silame	1999–2003
Representative	Sule Yari Gandi	ANPP	Wurno/Rabah	1999–2003
Representative	Sirajo Marafa Gatawa	ANPP	Isa-Sabon-Birni	1999–2003
Representative	Zubairu S. Magori	PDP	Gwadaba/Illiza	1999–2003
Representative	Mohammed Usman	ANPP	Kware/Wamakko	1999–2003
Representative	Arewa S. Mohammed	ANPP	Gudu/Tangaza	1999–2003
Representative	Aliyu Umar Sanyinna	PDP	Kebbe/Tambuwal	1999–2003
Representative	Zakari Muhammed Shinaka	ANPP	Gorondo/Gada	1999–2003
Representative	Mohammed Arzika Tureta	PDP	Bodinga/Dange-Shuni/Tureta	1999–2003
Representative	Kiryo Yabo Hassan	PDP	Shagari/Yabo	1999–2003
