= 1999 Nigerian Senate elections in Sokoto State =

1999 Nigerian Senate election in Sokoto State

The 1999 Nigerian Senate election in Sokoto State was held on February 20, 1999, to elect members of the Nigerian Senate to represent Sokoto State. Aliyu Abubakar representing Sokoto North, Bello Jibrin Gada representing Sokoto East and Abdallah Wali representing Sokoto South all won on the platform of the All Nigeria Peoples Party.

== Overview ==
Affiliation	Party		Total
Affiliation	PDP	ANPP	Total
Before Election			3
After Election	0	3	3

== Summary ==
District	Incumbent	Party	Elected Senator	Party
Sokoto North			Aliyu Abubakar	ANPP
Sokoto East			Bello Jibrin Gada	ANPP
Sokoto South			Abdallah Wali	ANPP

== Results ==
=== Sokoto North ===
The election was won by Aliyu Abubakar of the All Nigeria Peoples Party.

1999 Nigerian Senate election in Sokoto State
Party	Candidate	Votes	%
ANPP	Aliyu Abubakar		
Total votes			
ANPP hold			

=== Sokoto East ===
The election was won by Bello Jibrin Gada of the All Nigeria Peoples Party.

1999 Nigerian Senate election in Sokoto State
Party	Candidate	Votes	%
ANPP	Bello Jibrin Gada		
Total votes			
ANPP hold			

=== Sokoto South ===
The election was won by Abdallah Wali of the All Nigeria Peoples Party.

1999 Nigerian Senate election in Sokoto State
Party	Candidate	Votes	%
ANPP	Abdallah Wali		
Total votes			
ANPP hold			
