= 1992 Nigerian Senate elections in Imo State =

1992 Nigerian Senate election in Imo State

The 1992 Nigerian Senate election in Imo State was held on July 4, 1992, to elect members of the Nigerian Senate to represent Imo State. Bright Nwanne representing Imo East/Owerri Zone, Umar Nnani Maduagwu representing Imo West/Orlu Zone and B.C. Agunanne representing Imo North/Okigwe Zone all won on the platform of the National Republican Convention.

== Overview ==
Affiliation	Party		Total
Affiliation	SDP	NRC	Total
Before Election			3
After Election	0	3	3

== Summary ==
District	Incumbent	Party	Elected Senator	Party
Imo East/Owerri Zone			Bright Nwanne	NRC
Imo West/Orlu Zone			Umar Nnani Maduagwu	NRC
Imo North/Okigwe Zone			B.C. Agunanne	NRC

== Results ==
=== Imo East/Owerri Zone ===
The election was won by Bright Nwanne of the National Republican Convention.

1992 Nigerian Senate election in Imo State
Party	Candidate	Votes	%
NRC	Bright Nwanne		
Total votes			
NRC hold			

=== Imo West/Orlu Zone ===
The election was won by Umar Nnani Maduagwu of the National Republican Convention.

1992 Nigerian Senate election in Imo State
Party	Candidate	Votes	%
NRC	Umar Nnani Maduagwu		
Total votes			
NRC hold			

=== Imo North/Okigwe Zone ===
The election was won by B.C. Agunanne of the National Republican Convention.

1992 Nigerian Senate election in Imo State
Party	Candidate	Votes	%
NRC	B.C. Agunanne		
Total votes			
NRC hold			
