= 1992 Nigerian Senate elections in Yobe State =

1992 Nigerian Senate election in Yobe State

The 1992 Nigerian Senate election in Yobe State was held on July 4, 1992, to elect members of the Nigerian Senate to represent Yobe State. Umar El-Gash Maina representing Yobe North, Lawan Gana Giba representing Yobe East and Adamu Abubakar Nikar representing Yobe South all won on the platform of the Social Democratic Party.

== Overview ==
| Affiliation | Party | | Total |
| Affiliation | SDP | NRC | Total |
|---|---|---|---|
| Before Election | | | 3 |
| After Election | 3 | 0 | 3 |

== Summary ==
| District | Incumbent | Party | Elected Senator | Party |
|---|---|---|---|---|
| Yobe North | | | Umar El-Gash Maina | SDP |
| Yobe East | | | Lawan Gana Giba | SDP |
| Yobe South | | | Adamu Abubakar Nikar | SDP |

== Results ==
=== Yobe North ===
The election was won by Umar El-Gash Maina of the Social Democratic Party.

1992 Nigerian Senate election in Yobe State
| Party | Candidate | Votes | % |
|---|---|---|---|
| SDP | Umar El-Gash Maina | | |
| Total votes | | | |
| SDP hold | | | |

=== Yobe East ===
The election was won by Lawan Gana Giba of the Social Democratic Party.

1992 Nigerian Senate election in Yobe State
| Party | Candidate | Votes | % |
|---|---|---|---|
| SDP | Lawan Gana Giba | | |
| Total votes | | | |
| SDP hold | | | |

=== Yobe South ===
The election was won by Adamu Abubakar Nikar of the Social Democratic Party.

1992 Nigerian Senate election in Yobe State
| Party | Candidate | Votes | % |
|---|---|---|---|
| SDP | Adamu Abubakar Nikar | | |
| Total votes | | | |
| SDP hold | | | |
