= 1992 Nigerian Senate elections in Kaduna State =

1992 Nigerian Senate election in Kaduna State

The 1992 Nigerian Senate election in Kaduna State was held on July 4, 1992, to elect members of the Nigerian Senate to represent Kaduna State. Tsoho Abubakar Ikara representing Kaduna West and Musa Bello representing Kaduna Central won on the platform of National Republican Convention, while Babale Maikarfi representing Kaduna East won on the platform of the Social Democratic Party.

== Overview ==
Affiliation	Party		Total
Affiliation	SDP	NRC	Total
Before Election			3
After Election	1	2	3

== Summary ==
District	Incumbent	Party	Elected Senator	Party
Kaduna West			Tsoho Abubakar Ikara	NRC
Kaduna Central			Musa Bello	NRC
Kaduna East			Babale Maikarfi	SDP

== Results ==
=== Kaduna West ===
The election was won by Tsoho Abubakar Ikara of the National Republican Convention.

1992 Nigerian Senate election in Kaduna State
Party	Candidate	Votes	%
NRC	Tsoho Abubakar Ikara		
Total votes			
NRC hold			

=== Kaduna Central ===
The election was won by Musa Bello of the National Republican Convention.

1992 Nigerian Senate election in Kaduna State
Party	Candidate	Votes	%
NRC	Musa Bello		
Total votes			
NRC hold			

=== Kaduna East ===
The election was won by Babale Maikarfi of the Social Democratic Party.

1992 Nigerian Senate election in Kaduna State
Party	Candidate	Votes	%
SDP	Babale Maikarfi		
Total votes			
SDP hold			
