= 2003 Sokoto State gubernatorial election =

2003 gubernatorial election in Sokoto State, Nigeria

- April 19, 2003
Nominee	Attahiru Bafarawa	Abdallah Wali
Party	ANPP	PDP
Running mate	Aliyu Magatakarda Wamakko	Umar Abubakar Gada
Popular vote	665,545	245,047
Governor before election
Attahiru Bafarawa
All People's Party (Nigeria)
Elected Governor
Attahiru Bafarawa
ANPP

The 2003 Sokoto State gubernatorial election occurred on April 19, 2003. ANPP candidate Attahiru Bafarawa won the election, defeating PDP Abdallah Wali and 4 other candidates.

== Results ==
Attahiru Bafarawa from the ANPP won the election. 6 candidates contested in the election.

The total number of registered voters in the state was 1,476,691, total votes cast was 1,014,573, valid votes was 925,711 and rejected votes was 88,862.

- Attahiru Bafarawa, (ANPP)- 665,545
- Abdallah Wali, PDP- 245,047
- Bello Isiyaka, APGA- 8,515
- Garba Aliyu Dogondaji, AD- 5,764
- Tambari Ahmed, UNPP- 508
- Inuwa Abdulkadir, NDP- 332
