= 1992 Nigerian Senate elections in Taraba State =

1992 Nigerian Senate election in Taraba State

The 1992 Nigerian Senate election in Taraba State was held on July 4, 1992, to elect members of the Nigerian Senate to represent Taraba State. Abdullahi Kirim representing Taraba North, Ibrahim Goje representing Taraba Central and Utisere Joshua Yohanna representing Taraba South all won on the platform of the Social Democratic Party.

== Overview ==
Affiliation	Party		Total
Affiliation	SDP	NRC	Total
Before Election			3
After Election	3	0	3

== Summary ==
District	Incumbent	Party	Elected Senator	Party
Taraba North			Abdullahi Kirim	SDP
Taraba Central			Ibrahim Goje	SDP
Taraba South			Utisere Joshua Yohanna	SDP

== Results ==
=== Taraba North ===
The election was won by Abdullahi Kirim of the Social Democratic Party.

1992 Nigerian Senate election in Taraba State
Party	Candidate	Votes	%
SDP	Abdullahi Kirim		
Total votes			
SDP hold			

=== Taraba Central ===
The election was won by Ibrahim Goje of the Social Democratic Party.

1992 Nigerian Senate election in Taraba State
Party	Candidate	Votes	%
SDP	Ibrahim Goje		
Total votes			
SDP hold			

=== Taraba South ===
The election was won by Utisere Joshua Yohanna of the Social Democratic Party.

1992 Nigerian Senate election in Taraba State
Party	Candidate	Votes	%
SDP	Utisere Joshua Yohanna		
Total votes			
SDP hold			
