= 1992 Nigerian Senate elections in Rivers State =

1992 Nigerian Senate election in Rivers State

The 1992 Nigerian Senate election in Rivers State was held on July 4, 1992, to elect members of the Nigerian Senate to represent Rivers State. Denton West representing Rivers South-East, Felix Orobo representing Rivers West and Bennet Birrari representing Rivers East all won on the platform of the National Republican Convention.

== Overview ==
Affiliation	Party		Total
Affiliation	SDP	NRC	Total
Before Election			3
After Election	0	3	3

== Summary ==
District	Incumbent	Party	Elected Senator	Party
Rivers South-East			Denton West	NRC
Rivers West			Felix Orobo	NRC
Rivers East			Bennet Birrari	NRC

== Results ==
=== Rivers South-East ===
The election was won by Denton West of the National Republican Convention.

1992 Nigerian Senate election in Rivers State
Party	Candidate	Votes	%
NRC	Denton West		
Total votes			
NRC hold			

=== Rivers West ===
The election was won by Felix Orobo of the National Republican Convention.

1992 Nigerian Senate election in Rivers State
Party	Candidate	Votes	%
NRC	Felix Orobo		
Total votes			
NRC hold			

=== Rivers East ===
The election was won by Bennet Birrari of the National Republican Convention.

1992 Nigerian Senate election in Rivers State
Party	Candidate	Votes	%
NRC	Bennet Birrari		
Total votes			
NRC hold			
