= 1992 Nigerian Senate elections in Osun State =

1992 Nigerian Senate election in Osun State

The 1992 Nigerian Senate election in Osun State was held on July 4, 1992, to elect members of the Nigerian Senate to represent Osun State. Olu Alabi representing Osun Central, Omilani Oladimeji representing Osun West and Segun Bamigbetan representing Osun East all won on the platform of the Social Democratic Party.

== Overview ==
| Affiliation | Party | | Total |
| Affiliation | SDP | NRC | Total |
|---|---|---|---|
| Before Election | | | 3 |
| After Election | 3 | 0 | 3 |

== Summary ==
| District | Incumbent | Party | Elected Senator | Party |
|---|---|---|---|---|
| Osun Central | | | Olu Alabi | SDP |
| Osun West | | | Omilani Oladimeji | SDP |
| Osun East | | | Segun Bamigbetan | SDP |

== Results ==
=== Osun Central ===
The election was won by Olu Alabi of the Social Democratic Party.

1992 Nigerian Senate election in Osun State
| Party | Candidate | Votes | % |
|---|---|---|---|
| SDP | Olu Alabi | | |
| Total votes | | | |
| SDP hold | | | |

=== Osun West ===
The election was won by Omilani Oladimeji of the Social Democratic Party.

1992 Nigerian Senate election in Osun State
| Party | Candidate | Votes | % |
|---|---|---|---|
| SDP | Omilani Oladimeji | | |
| Total votes | | | |
| SDP hold | | | |

=== Osun East ===
The election was won by Segun Bamigbetan of the Social Democratic Party.

1992 Nigerian Senate election in Osun State
| Party | Candidate | Votes | % |
|---|---|---|---|
| SDP | Segun Bamigbetan | | |
| Total votes | | | |
| SDP hold | | | |
