= 1992 Nigerian Senate elections in Kebbi State =

1992 Nigerian Senate election in Kebbi State

The 1992 Nigerian Senate election in Kebbi State was held on July 4, 1992, to elect members of the Nigerian Senate to represent Kebbi State. Adamu Baba Augie representing Kebbi North, Aliyu Mohammed Nassarawa representing Kebbi Central and Bala Tafida Yauri representing Kebbi South all won on the platform of the National Republican Convention.

== Overview ==
Affiliation	Party		Total
Affiliation	SDP	NRC	Total
Before Election			3
After Election	0	3	3

== Summary ==
District	Incumbent	Party	Elected Senator	Party
Kebbi North			Adamu Baba Augie	NRC
Kebbi Central			Aliyu Mohammed Nassarawa	NRC
Kebbi South			Bala Tafida Yauri	NRC

== Results ==
=== Kebbi North ===
The election was won by Adamu Baba Augie of the National Republican Convention.

1992 Nigerian Senate election in Kebbi State
Party	Candidate	Votes	%
NRC	Adamu Baba Augie		
Total votes			
NRC hold			

=== Kebbi Central ===
The election was won by Aliyu Mohammed Nassarawa of the National Republican Convention.

1992 Nigerian Senate election in Kebbi State
Party	Candidate	Votes	%
NRC	Aliyu Mohammed Nassarawa		
Total votes			
NRC hold			

=== Kebbi South ===
The election was won by Bala Tafida Yauri of the National Republican Convention.

1992 Nigerian Senate election in Kebbi State
Party	Candidate	Votes	%
NRC	Bala Tafida Yauri		
Total votes			
NRC hold			
