= 1992 Nigerian Senate elections in Plateau State =

1992 Nigerian Senate election in Plateau State

The 1992 Nigerian Senate election in Plateau State was held on July 4, 1992, to elect members of the Nigerian Senate to represent Plateau State. Jacon Isandu representing Plateau North, V. K. Dangin representing Plateau East and Emmanuel Elaro representing Plateau West all won on the platform of the Social Democratic Party.

== Overview ==
Affiliation	Party		Total
Affiliation	SDP	NRC	Total
Before Election			3
After Election	3	0	3

== Summary ==
District	Incumbent	Party	Elected Senator	Party
Plateau North			Jacon Isandu	SDP
Plateau East			V. K. Dangin	SDP
Plateau West			Emmanuel Elaro	SDP

== Results ==
=== Plateau North ===
The election was won by Jacon Isandu of the Social Democratic Party.

1992 Nigerian Senate election in Plateau State
Party	Candidate	Votes	%
SDP	Jacon Isandu		
Total votes			
SDP hold			

=== Plateau East ===
The election was won by V. K. Dangin of the Social Democratic Party.

1992 Nigerian Senate election in Plateau State
Party	Candidate	Votes	%
SDP	V. K. Dangin		
Total votes			
SDP hold			

=== Plateau West ===
The election was won by Emmanuel Elaro of the Social Democratic Party.

1992 Nigerian Senate election in Plateau State
Party	Candidate	Votes	%
SDP	Emmanuel Elaro		
Total votes			
SDP hold			
