= 1992 Nigerian Senate elections in Sokoto State =

1992 Nigerian Senate election in Sokoto State

The 1992 Nigerian Senate election in Sokoto State was held on July 4, 1992, to elect members of the Nigerian Senate to represent Sokoto State. Garba Ila Gada representing Sokoto North, Saidu Idirisu representing Sokoto East and Ladan Shuni representing Sokoto South all won on the platform of the National Republican Convention.

== Overview ==
Affiliation	Party		Total
Affiliation	SDP	NRC	Total
Before Election			3
After Election	0	3	3

== Summary ==
District	Incumbent	Party	Elected Senator	Party
Sokoto North			Garba Ila Gada	NRC
Sokoto East			Saidu Idirisu	NRC
Sokoto South			Ladan Shuni	NRC

== Results ==
=== Sokoto North ===
The election was won by Garba Ila Gada of the National Republican Convention.

1992 Nigerian Senate election in Sokoto State
Party	Candidate	Votes	%
NRC	Garba Ila Gada		
Total votes			
NRC hold			

=== Sokoto East ===
The election was won by Saidu Idirisu of the National Republican Convention.

1992 Nigerian Senate election in Sokoto State
Party	Candidate	Votes	%
NRC	Saidu Idirisu		
Total votes			
NRC hold			

=== Sokoto South ===
The election was won by Ladan Shuni of the National Republican Convention.

1992 Nigerian Senate election in Sokoto State
Party	Candidate	Votes	%
NRC	Ladan Shuni		
Total votes			
NRC hold			
