= Nigerian Republics =

Nigerian Republic may refer to one of several republican periods in Nigeria’s constitutional history since Nigeria became the Federal Republic of Nigeria in 1963:

- First Nigerian Republic (1963–1966), the first republican constitutional government of Nigeria, ended by the January 1966 military coup d’état
- Second Nigerian Republic (1979–1983), the civilian presidential republic established after military rule, ended by the December 1983 military coup d’état
- Third Nigerian Republic (1992–1993), partially implemented republican transition under the 1989 Constitution
- Fourth Nigerian Republic (1999–present), the current republican constitutional order, established under the 1999 Constitution
