= 1992 Nigerian Senate elections in Ondo State =

1992 Nigerian Senate election in Ondo State

The 1992 Nigerian Senate election in Ondo State was held on July 4, 1992, to elect members of the Nigerian Senate to represent Ondo State. Remi Okunrinboye representing Ondo East, Adebiyi Adekeye representing Ondo South and Olawale Adewunmi representing Ondo North all won on the platform of the Social Democratic Party.

== Overview ==
Affiliation	Party		Total
Affiliation	SDP	NRC	Total
Before Election			3
After Election	3	0	3

== Summary ==
District	Incumbent	Party	Elected Senator	Party
Ondo East			Remi Okunrinboye	SDP
Ondo South			Adebiyi Adekeye	SDP
Ondo North			Olawale Adewunmi	SDP

== Results ==
=== Ondo East ===
The election was won by Remi Okunrinboye of the Social Democratic Party.

1992 Nigerian Senate election in Ondo State
Party	Candidate	Votes	%
SDP	Remi Okunrinboye		
Total votes			
SDP hold			

=== Ondo South ===
The election was won by Adebiyi Adekeye of the Social Democratic Party.

1992 Nigerian Senate election in Ondo State
Party	Candidate	Votes	%
SDP	Adebiyi Adekeye		
Total votes			
SDP hold			

=== Ondo North ===
The election was won by Olawale Adewunmi of the Social Democratic Party.

1992 Nigerian Senate election in Ondo State
Party	Candidate	Votes	%
SDP	Olawale Adewunmi		
Total votes			
SDP hold			
