= 1992 Nigerian Senate elections in Akwa Ibom State =

1992 Nigerian Senate election in Akwa Ibom State

The 1992 Nigerian Senate election in Akwa Ibom State was held on July 4, 1992, to elect members of the Nigerian Senate to represent Akwa Ibom State. Etang Edet Umoyo representing Akwa Ibom South, Akaninyene Ukpanah representing Akwa Ibom North-West and Anietie Okon representing Akwa Ibom North-East all won on the platform of the National Republican Convention.

== Overview ==
| Affiliation | Party | | Total |
| Affiliation | SDP | NRC | Total |
|---|---|---|---|
| Before Election | | | 3 |
| After Election | 0 | 3 | 3 |

== Summary ==
| District | Incumbent | Party | Elected Senator | Party |
|---|---|---|---|---|
| Akwa Ibom South | | | Etang Edet Umoyo | NRC |
| Akwa Ibom North-West | | | Akaninyene Ukpanah | NRC |
| Akwa Ibom North-East | | | Anietie Okon | NRC |

== Results ==
=== Akwa Ibom South ===
The election was won by Etang Edet Umoyo of the National Republican Convention.

1992 Nigerian Senate election in Akwa Ibom State
| Party | Candidate | Votes | % |
|---|---|---|---|
| NRC | Etang Edet Umoyo | | |
| Total votes | | | |
| NRC hold | | | |

=== Akwa Ibom North-West ===
The election was won by Akaninyene Ukpanah of the National Republican Convention.

1992 Nigerian Senate election in Akwa Ibom State
| Party | Candidate | Votes | % |
|---|---|---|---|
| NRC | Akaninyene Ukpanah | | |
| Total votes | | | |
| NRC hold | | | |

=== Akwa Ibom North-East ===
The election was won by Anietie Okon of the National Republican Convention.

1992 Nigerian Senate election in Akwa Ibom State
| Party | Candidate | Votes | % |
|---|---|---|---|
| NRC | Anietie Okon | | |
| Total votes | | | |
| NRC hold | | | |
