= 1992 Nigerian Senate elections in Jigawa State =

1992 Nigerian Senate election in Jigawa State

The 1992 Nigerian Senate election in Jigawa State was held on July 4, 1992, to elect members of the Nigerian Senate to represent Jigawa State. Ibrahim Musa Kazaure representing Jigawa West and Musa Bako Abdullahi Aujara representing Jigawa Central won on the platform of Social Democratic Party, while Muhammad Ubali Shittu representing Jigawa East won on the platform of the National Republican Convention.

== Overview ==
Affiliation	Party		Total
Affiliation	SDP	NRC	Total
Before Election			3
After Election	2	1	3

== Summary ==
District	Incumbent	Party	Elected Senator	Party
Jigawa West			Ibrahim Musa Kazaure	SDP
Jigawa Central			Musa Bako Abdullahi Aujara	SDP
Jigawa East			Muhammad Ubali Shittu	NRC

== Results ==
=== Jigawa West ===
The election was won by Ibrahim Musa Kazaure of the Social Democratic Party.

1992 Nigerian Senate election in Jigawa State
Party	Candidate	Votes	%
SDP	Ibrahim Musa Kazaure		
Total votes			
SDP hold			

=== Jigawa Central ===
The election was won by Musa Bako Abdullahi Aujara of the Social Democratic Party.

1992 Nigerian Senate election in Jigawa State
Party	Candidate	Votes	%
SDP	Musa Bako Abdullahi Aujara		
Total votes			
SDP hold			

=== Jigawa East ===
The election was won by Muhammad Ubali Shittu of the National Republican Convention.

1992 Nigerian Senate election in Jigawa State
Party	Candidate	Votes	%
NRC	Muhammad Ubali Shittu		
Total votes			
NRC hold			
