= 1992 Nigerian Senate elections in Kwara State =

1992 Nigerian Senate election in Kwara State

The 1992 Nigerian Senate election in Kwara State was held on July 4, 1992, to elect members of the Nigerian Senate to represent Kwara State. Idris Gunu Haliru representing Kwara North, Ayinla Olomoda representing Kwara Central and Bisi Oyewo representing Kwara South all won on the platform of the Social Democratic Party.

== Overview ==
Affiliation	Party		Total
Affiliation	SDP	NRC	Total
Before Election			3
After Election	3	0	3

== Summary ==
District	Incumbent	Party	Elected Senator	Party
Kwara North			Idris Gunu Haliru	SDP
Kwara Central			Ayinla Olomoda	SDP
Kwara South			Bisi Oyewo	SDP

== Results ==
=== Kwara North ===
The election was won by Idris Gunu Haliru of the Social Democratic Party.

1992 Nigerian Senate election in Kwara State
Party	Candidate	Votes	%
SDP	Idris Gunu Haliru		
Total votes			
SDP hold			

=== Kwara Central ===
The election was won by Ayinla Olomoda of the Social Democratic Party.

1992 Nigerian Senate election in Kwara State
Party	Candidate	Votes	%
SDP	Ayinla Olomoda		
Total votes			
SDP hold			

=== Kwara South ===
The election was won by Bisi Oyewo of the Social Democratic Party.

1992 Nigerian Senate election in Kwara State
Party	Candidate	Votes	%
SDP	Bisi Oyewo		
Total votes			
SDP hold			
