= Ibrahim Kazaure =

Nigerian politician (born 1954)

Federal Minister of Labour and Productivity
- In office 10 February 2010 – 17 March 2010
- Preceded by: Adetokunbo Kayode
- Succeeded by: Chukwuemeka Ngozichineke Wogu

Personal details
- Born: 12 November 1954 (age 71) Jigawa State, Nigeria

Ibrahim Kazaure (born 12 November 1954) was a Nigerian senator in the Nigerian Third Republic and Nigerian Ambassador to the Kingdom of Saudi Arabia who was briefly Federal Minister of Labour and Productivity in 2010.

== Early life and education ==
Kazaure was born in Jigawa State on 12 November 1954, and gained a national diploma in building and civil engineering.

== Political career ==
He became the Commissioner for Education in Kano State in 1983. He was elected to the Senate in the Nigerian Third Republic, serving as the Majority Whip. He was the Nigerian Ambassador to Saudi Arabia between 2003 and 2007.

He was appointed the Minister of Special Duties by president Umaru Yar'Adua in December 2008. He was appointed Minister of Labour and Productivity on 10 February 2010, when acting president Goodluck Jonathan moved Adetokunbo Kayode to the Ministry of Justice. He left office on 17 March 2010 when acting president Goodluck Jonathan dissolved his cabinet.
