= Adetokunbo Kayode =

Nigerian politician and lawyer (born 1960)

Defence Minister of Nigeria
- In office 6 April 2010 – 30 June 2011
- Preceded by: Godwin Abbe
- Succeeded by: Haliru Mohammed Bello

Minister of Justice and Attorney General of the Federation
- In office 10 February 2010 – 17 March 2010
- Preceded by: Michael Aondoakaa
- Succeeded by: Mohammed Bello Adoke

Minister of Labour and Employment
- In office 17 December 2008 – 10 February 2010
- Preceded by: Hassan Muhammed Lawal
- Succeeded by: Ibrahim Kazaure

Minister of Tourism
- In office 26 July 2007 – 7 November 2008
- Preceded by: Babalola Borishade
- Succeeded by: Jibrin Bello Gada

Personal details
- Born: 31 October 1960 (age 65) Ikaram Akoko, Western Region, Nigeria (now in Ondo State, Nigeria)

Adetokunbo Kayode (born 31 October 1960) is a Nigerian corporate lawyer, tax expert and international arbitrator.

== Early life ==
He attended CMS Grammar School, in Lagos. He studied law at the University of Lagos, Nigeria Law School, Lagos, Strategic Leadership at the Oxford and Cambridge Universities, Strategy and Public Communications at the World Bank/ Annenberg Program of the University of Southern California Libraries, as well as Strategic Negotiations training at Harvard University.

== Career ==
Kayode is a Senior Advocate of Nigeria (SAN), a Life Bencher (the highest legal rank and honor in Nigeria). He is a Fellow of the Chartered Institute of Arbitration, UK; Fellow of the Chartered Institute of Mediators and Conciliators of Nigeria; and Chartered Institute of Taxation of Nigeria.

He served the Federal government of Nigeria as cabinet minister in different positions: Culture and Tourism; Labour/Employment; Federal Attorney General and Hon Minister of Justice; and Minister of Defence. He chairs the Peace and Security Committee of the Pan African Lawyers Union, Daresallam, Tanzania.

Kayode has business interests in law, agriculture, power and mining. He is on the board of the National Associations of Chambers of Commerce, Industry Mines and Agriculture of Nigeria, Nigerian Chamber of Mines, Nigeria Association of Investment Promotion Agencies.

He was awarded Order of the Niger (CON) as well as the Distinguished Service Order (DSO) of the Republic of Liberia. He serves as president, Abuja Chamber of Commerce and Industry, Nigeria.
