= Third Nigerian Republic =

Federal semi-democratic government (1992–1993)

The Third Republic was the planned republican government of Nigeria in 1992, intended to operate under the Third Republican Constitution. The political framework of the proposed republic included democratically elected state governors, state assemblies, and a national assembly serving as the federal legislature. However, the system was not fully democratic, as there was no democratically elected president.

The transition programme initiated by then-President Ibrahim Babangida was later perceived as a strategy to retain executive authority while conferring only limited legislative powers on the National Assembly. Under this arrangement, all bills passed by the Senate and the House of Representatives required approval from the National Defence and Security Council before receiving presidential assent.

Although Babangida adopted the title of "President"—a departure from the "Head of State" designation used by earlier military rulers—he repeatedly postponed the conduct of presidential elections. The election eventually held on 12 June 1993 was annulled by his administration.

== Founded (1992) ==
The constitution of the Third Republic was drafted in 1989, marking the culmination of the work of a constituent assembly. General Ibrahim Badamasi Babangida (IBB), the military Head of State at the time, had initially pledged to end military rule by 1990. However, this timeline was later extended to 1993. In the spring of 1989, IBB lifted the ban on political activities, which had been in place since the 1983 coup.

The constitutional conference established two government-created political parties: the centre-right National Republican Convention (NRC) and the centre-left Social Democratic Party (SDP). Both parties were mandated to have a national outlook, rather than being based on ethnic or regional affiliations. Gubernatorial and state legislative elections were held in December 1991. The elected civilian governors and state legislators assumed office in January 1992.

The presidential election, originally scheduled earlier, was postponed until 12 June 1993 due to political instability. Moshood Kashimawo Olawale (MKO) Abiola, a wealthy Yoruba businessman, won a decisive victory under the SDP platform, defeating Bashir Tofa of the NRC. Abiola won in Tofa's home state in the North, the Federal Capital Territory (Abuja), military polling units, and in over two-thirds of Nigeria's states. Despite northern dominance in the country's post-independence political landscape, Abiola's appeal was national.

Years later, IBB reportedly described the annulment of the 1993 election as unfortunate, though he maintained it was the right decision at the time. He claimed to have received intelligence suggesting that Abiola's government would soon be overthrown in a military coup, which in his view made a transition to civilian rule futile. He acknowledged the irony of General Sani Abacha's subsequent coup, but insisted that the eventual military takeover was precisely what he had hoped to avoid.

The federal legislators were, however, more fortunate. After a series of delays following the 4 July 1992 legislative elections, the Third National Assembly was finally inaugurated on 5 December 1992. The same election saw the emergence of notable political figures such as Bola Ahmed Tinubu, then a protégé of Abiola, elected as Senator for Lagos West, and Chuba Okadigbo, a philosopher and later Senate President in the Fourth Nigerian Republic, elected as Senator for Anambra North.

Informal sources alleged that General Babangida supported the establishment of a legislature to give the government the appearance of representative democracy, but had no intention of relinquishing executive power to an elected president. While he continued to delay the presidential election, he reportedly lobbied members of the National Assembly to recognise him as the legitimate president, offering them the continuation of their positions as an incentive. The eventual collapse of the Third Republic was seen by many as inevitable.

== Political parties ==
- National Republican Convention (NRC)
- Social Democratic Party (SDP)

== President-elect and Vice President-elect ==
President-elect during the Nigerian Third Republic
President-elect	Elected	Party	Term
MKO Abiola	12 June 1993	SDP	4 years
Vice President-elect	Elected	Party	Term
Baba Gana Kingibe	12 June 1993	SDP	4 years

== National Assembly Members ==
Note: while the legislators were entitled to a four year tenure, their term was cut short by the dissolution of the Third Republic on 17 November 1993. The Third Nigerian Republic had only one female senator in the person of Kofoworola Bucknor-Akerele of Lagos Central

This is a complete list of democratically elected members of the National Assembly during the Third Nigerian Republic, as documented by journalist, author and publisher Chris Anyanwu in her book Law Makers 1992–1996: Federal Republic of Nigeria. Her work also describes the basis of the 1989 Constitution, which borrowed heavily from the 1979 Constitution of the Second Nigerian Republic, with important amendments. During the military regime of General Sani Abacha—for instance on 1 June 1995—Anyanwu was arrested, tried by a special military tribunal in connection with an alleged coup, and sentenced to life imprisonment in solitary confinement, later commuted to 15 years. She was eventually released following Abacha's death in 1998. She subsequently served two terms as a Senator of the Federal Republic of Nigeria (2007–2015), representing Imo East senatorial constituency.

In total, the Third Nigerian Republic National Assembly comprised 91 Senators and 593 members of the House of Representatives. However, 2 senatorial seats and 4 seats in the House of Representatives were declared vacant by the electoral umpire.

Senators during the Third Nigerian RepublicMembers of the House of Representatives during the Third Nigerian Republic
Image	Senator	Elected	Party	Constituency	Term	
	Mac Onyemachi Nwulu	4 July 1992	SDP	Abia South	5 December 1992 – 17 November 1993	
	Emmanuel Chiedoziem Nwaka	4 July 1992	NRC	Abia North	5 December 1992 – 17 November 1993	
	Onyeka A. Okorafor	4 July 1992	NRC	Abia Central	5 December 1992 – 17 November 1993	
	Hamman Bello Mohammed	4 July 1992	NRC	Adamawa Central	5 December 1992 – 17 November 1993	
	Manasa T. B. Daniel	4 July 1992	NRC	Adamawa South	5 December 1992 – 17 November 1993	
	Paul Wampana	4 July 1992	NRC	Adamawa North	5 December 1992 – 17 November 1993	
	Matthias Nwafor Chukwuma	4 July 1992	SDP	Anambra South	5 December 1992 – 17 November 1993	
	Ebenezer Chukwuemeka Ikeyina	4 July 1992	SDP	Anambra Central	5 December 1992 – 17 November 1993	
Chuba-okadigbo	Chuba Okadigbo	4 July 1992	SDP	Anambra North	5 December 1992 – 17 November 1993	
	Etang Edet Umoyo	4 July 1992	NRC	Akwa Ibom South-East	5 December 1992 – 17 November 1993	
	Aniete Udo Okon	4 July 1992	NRC	Akwa Ibom North-East	5 December 1992 – 17 November 1993	
	Akaninyene Ukpanah	4 July 1992	NRC	Akwa Ibom North-West	5 December 1992 – 17 November 1993	
	Ibrahim Yakubu Lame	4 July 1992	NRC	Bauchi Central	5 December 1992 – 17 November 1993	
	Mohamed Bello Katagun	4 July 1992	NRC	Bauchi North	5 December 1992 – 17 November 1993	
	Mohamed Uba Ahmed	4 July 1992	NRC	Bauchi East	5 December 1992 – 17 November 1993	
	Ameh Ebute	4 July 1992	SDP	Benue South	5 December 1992 – 17 November 1993	
	Iyorchia Ayu (President of the Senate)	4 July 1992	SDP	Benue North-West	5 December 1992 – 17 November 1993	
	David Iornem	4 July 1992	SDP	Benue North-East	5 December 1992 – 17 November 1993	
	Abba Hassan Sadiq	4 July 1992	SDP	Borno North	5 December 1992 – 17 November 1993	
	Abubakar Mahdi	4 July 1992	SDP	Borno South	5 December 1992 – 17 November 1993	
	Ali Modu Sheriff	4 July 1992	NRC	Borno Central	5 December 1992 – 17 November 1993	
	Patrick Offiong Ani	4 July 1992	NRC	Cross River South	5 December 1992 – 17 November 1993	
	Liyel Olayinka Imoke	4 July 1992	NRC	Cross River Central	5 December 1992 – 17 November 1993	
	Paul Ukpo	4 July 1992	NRC	Cross River North	5 December 1992 – 17 November 1993	
	D. K. Azinge	4 July 1992	SDP	Delta North	5 December 1992 – 17 November 1993	
	W. O. Eradajaye	4 July 1992	SDP	Delta Central	5 December 1992 – 17 November 1993	
	F. S. Okpozo	4 July 1992	SDP	Delta South	5 December 1992 – 17 November 1993	
	Albert Osuma Legogie (Deputy Senate President)	4 July 1992	SDP	Edo North	5 December 1992 – 17 November 1993	
	Sunday O. Iyahen	4 July 1992	SDP	Edo South	5 December 1992 – 17 November 1993	
	John Oriaifo	4 July 1992	SDP	Edo South East	5 December 1992 – 17 November 1993	
	Polycarp Ogbonna Nwite	4 July 1992	SDP	Enugu East	5 December 1992 – 17 November 1993	
	Ben Collins Ndu	4 July 1992	NRC	Enugu Central	5 December 1992 – 17 November 1993	
	Fidelis C. Okoro	4 July 1992	NRC	Enugu North	5 December 1992 – 17 November 1993	
	Hassan Asa Haruna Tadanyigbe	4 July 1992	SDP	Federal Capital Territory (Abuja)	5 December 1992 – 17 November 1993	
	Bright Nwanne	4 July 1992	NRC	Owerri Zone	5 December 1992 – 17 November 1993	
	Umar Nnadi Maduagwu	4 July 1992	NRC	Orlu Zone	5 December 1992 – 17 November 1993	
	B. C. Agunanne	4 July 1992	NRC	Okigwe Zone	5 December 1992 – 17 November 1993	
	Musa Bako Abdullahi Aujara	4 July 1992	SDP	Jigawa Central	5 December 1992 – 17 November 1993	
	Ubali Shittu Magama	4 July 1992	NRC	Jigawa East	5 December 1992 – 17 November 1993	
	Ibrahim Musa Kazaure	4 July 1992	SDP	Jigawa West	5 December 1992 – 17 November 1993	
	Musa Bello	4 July 1992	NRC	Kaduna Central	5 December 1992 – 17 November 1993	
	Tsoho Abubakar Ikara	4 July 1992	NRC	Kaduna West	5 December 1992 – 17 November 1993	
	Babale K. Maikarfi	4 July 1992	SDP	Kaduna East	5 December 1992 – 17 November 1993	
	Aminu Inuwa	4 July 1992	SDP	Kano Central	5 December 1992 – 17 November 1993	
	Magaji A. Abdullahi	4 July 1992	SDP	Kano North	5 December 1992 – 17 November 1993	
	Isa Kachoko	4 July 1992	NRC	Kano South	5 December 1992 – 17 November 1993	
	Abu Ibrahim (Nigerian politician)	4 July 1992	NRC	Katsina South	5 December 1992 – 17 November 1993	
	Ibrahim A. Safana	4 July 1992	SDP	Katsina Central	5 December 1992 – 17 November 1993	
	Kanti Bello	4 July 1992	SDP	Katsina North	5 December 1992 – 17 November 1993	
	Aliyu Mohammad Nassarawa	4 July 1992	NRC	Kebbi Central	5 December 1992 – 17 November 1993	
	Adamu Baba Augie	4 July 1992	NRC	Kebbi North	5 December 1992 – 17 November 1993	
	Bala Tafidan Yauri	4 July 1992	NRC	Kebbi South	5 December 1992 – 17 November 1993	
	A. T. Ahmed	4 July 1992	SDP	Kogi Central	5 December 1992 – 17 November 1993	
	Ahmadu Adah Ali	4 July 1992	NRC	Kogi East	5 December 1992 – 17 November 1993	
	Sunday Bolorunduro Awoniyi	4 July 1992	NRC	Kogi West	5 December 1992 – 17 November 1993	
	Ayinla Olomada	4 July 1992	SDP	Kwara Central	5 December 1992 – 17 November 1993	
	Michael Adebisi Oyewo	4 July 1992	SDP	Kwara South	5 December 1992 – 17 November 1993	
	Idris Gunu Haliru	4 July 1992	SDP	Kwara North	5 December 1992 – 17 November 1993	
Asiwaju_Bola_Ahmed_Tinubu_(5980497975)_(Cropped)	Bola Ahmed Tinubu	4 July 1992	SDP	Lagos West	5 December 1992 – 17 November 1993	
	Kofoworola Bucknor-Akerele	4 July 1992	SDP	Lagos Central	5 December 1992 – 17 November 1993	
	Anthony Adefuye	4 July 1992	SDP	Lagos East	5 December 1992 – 17 November 1993	
	Dangana Ndayako	4 July 1992	NRC	Niger South	5 December 1992 – 17 November 1993	
	Haliru Dantoro	4 July 1992	NRC	Niger North	5 December 1992 – 17 November 1993	
	Idris Kuta	4 July 1992	NRC	Niger East	5 December 1992 – 17 November 1993	
	Jubril Martins-Kuye	4 July 1992	SDP	Ogun East	5 December 1992 – 17 November 1993	
	Solomon Ayodeji Otegbola	4 July 1992	SDP	Ogun West	5 December 1992 – 17 November 1993	
	Monsurudeen Babatunde Osholake	4 July 1992	SDP	Ogun Central	5 December 1992 – 17 November 1993	
	Olawole Julius Adewumi	4 July 1992	SDP	Ondo North	5 December 1992 – 17 November 1993	
	Olu Oluremi Okunrinboye	4 July 1992	SDP	Ondo East	5 December 1992 – 17 November 1993	
	Adebiyi A. Adekaye	4 July 1992	SDP	Ondo South	5 December 1992 – 17 November 1993	
	Segun Oladele Bamigbetan	4 July 1992	SDP	Osun East	5 December 1992 – 17 November 1993	
	Olu Alabi	4 July 1992	SDP	Osun Central	5 December 1992 – 17 November 1993	
	Omilani Olayinka Oladimeji	4 July 1992	SDP	Osun West	5 December 1992 – 17 November 1993	
	Rashidi Adewolu Ladoja	4 July 1992	SDP	Oyo South	5 December 1992 – 17 November 1993	
	Wande Abimbola	4 July 1992	SDP	Oyo Central	5 December 1992 – 17 November 1993	
	Ayantayo Ayandele	4 July 1992	SDP	Oyo North	5 December 1992 – 17 November 1993	
	Venmak Kurnap Dangin	4 July 1992	SDP	Plateau East	5 December 1992 – 17 November 1993	
	Jacon Adankana Isandu	4 July 1992	SDP	Plateau North	5 December 1992 – 17 November 1993	
	Joseph K. Umaru	4 July 1992	SDP	Plateau West	5 December 1992 – 17 November 1993	
	Bennett Birabi	4 July 1992	NRC	Rivers East	5 December 1992 – 17 November 1993	
	Ngoji John Denton-West	4 July 1992	NRC	Rivers South-East	5 December 1992 – 17 November 1993	
	Felix O. Oboro	4 July 1992	NRC	Rivers West	5 December 1992 – 17 November 1993	
	Landan Abdullahi Shhuni	4 July 1992	NRC	Sokoto South	5 December 1992 – 17 November 1993	
	Saidu M. Idirisu	4 July 1992	NRC	Sokoto East	5 December 1992 – 17 November 1993	
	Garba Ilah Gada	4 July 1992	NRC	Sokoto North	5 December 1992 – 17 November 1993	
	Utisere Joshua Yohanna	4 July 1992	SDP	Taraba South	5 December 1992 – 17 November 1993	
	Ibrahim Goje Gassol	4 July 1992	SDP	Taraba Central	5 December 1992 – 17 November 1993	
	Abdullahi Kirim	4 July 1992	SDP	Taraba North	5 December 1992 – 17 November 1993	
	Adamu Abubakar Nikau	4 July 1992	SDP	Yobe South	5 December 1992 – 17 November 1993	
	Lawan Gana Guba	4 July 1992	SDP	Yobe East	5 December 1992 – 17 November 1993	
	Umar El-Gash Maina	4 July 1992	SDP	Yobe North	5 December 1992 – 17 November 1993	
State	Image	Member	Elected	Party	Constituency	Term
Abia	Chiekwe Esiaga Nze	4 July 1992	SDP	Aba-North	5 December 1992 – 17 November 1993	
—	Omenihu Nwogwugwu	4 July 1992	SDP	Aba-South	5 December 1992 – 17 November 1993	
—	Iheanacho Blessing Nwannunu	4 July 1992	NRC	Isiala Ngwa-South	5 December 1992 – 17 November 1993	
—	Sen._Adolphus_Wabara	Adolphus Wabara	4 July 1992	NRC	Ukwa-East	5 December 1992 – 17 November 1993
—	Uzomah Kingsley Anamah	4 July 1992	NRC	Ikwuano	5 December 1992 – 17 November 1993	
—	O. N. Akomas	4 July 1992	SDP	Umuahia	5 December 1992 – 17 November 1993	
—	Nwokonkwo Emmanuel Chikezie	4 July 1992	NRC	Isiala Ngwa-North	5 December 1992 – 17 November 1993	
—	Nnanna Ngwu	4 July 1992	NRC	Arochukwu	5 December 1992 – 17 November 1993	
—	Daniel Nmeme Enere	4 July 1992	SDP	Ukwu-West	5 December 1992 – 17 November 1993	
—	Gabriel Eni Otu	4 July 1992	NRC	Afikpo-North	5 December 1992 – 17 November 1993	
—	D. O. Elebe	4 July 1992	NRC	Onicha	5 December 1992 – 17 November 1993	
—	Chidia Ndukwe Maduekwe	4 July 1992	SDP	Ohafia	5 December 1992 – 17 November 1993	
—	Emeka Ben Obi	4 July 1992	NRC	Nsuikwuato	5 December 1992 – 17 November 1993	
—	Okorie U. Agu	4 July 1992	NRC	Afikpo-South	5 December 1992 – 17 November 1993	
—	Orji Uzor Kalu	4 July 1992	NRC	Bende	5 December 1992 – 17 November 1993	
—	Ben Yadiri Chukwu Okike	4 July 1992	NRC	Ohaozara	5 December 1992 – 17 November 1993	
—	Macaulay Ikeokwu Obia	4 July 1992	NRC	Obioma-Ngwa	5 December 1992 – 17 November 1993	
Adamawa	Abubakar Umar Al'uma	4 July 1992	NRC	Yola	5 December 1992 – 17 November 1993	
—	Michael Alaramu Angilda	4 July 1992	NRC	Madagali	5 December 1992 – 17 November 1993	
—	Ahmed Hassan Barata	4 July 1992	NRC	Shelleng	5 December 1992 – 17 November 1993	
—	Musa Bubakari Kamale	4 July 1992	NRC	Michika	5 December 1992 – 17 November 1993	
—	Adiel Edmund Olse	4 July 1992	NRC	Numan	5 December 1992 – 17 November 1993	
—	Godfrey Ayuba Yoila	4 July 1992	SDP	Demsa	5 December 1992 – 17 November 1993	
—	Abdulrahman Abubakar Bobbu	4 July 1992	NRC	Gombi	5 December 1992 – 17 November 1993	
—	Musa Janro	4 July 1992	NRC	Mubi	5 December 1992 – 17 November 1993	
—	Nashon Gubi Nabi	4 July 1992	NRC	Mayo Belwa	5 December 1992 – 17 November 1993	
—	Munun G. Mapundi	4 July 1992	NRC	Jada	5 December 1992 – 17 November 1993	
—	Aliyu Audu Mustapha	4 July 1992	NRC	Macha	5 December 1992 – 17 November 1993	
—	Abdulmumini Umar	4 July 1992	NRC	Ganye	5 December 1992 – 17 November 1993	
—	Ethan Yusuf	4 July 1992	SDP	Hong	5 December 1992 – 17 November 1993	
—	Umaru Hamman Tukur	4 July 1992	NRC	Fufore	5 December 1992 – 17 November 1993	
—	Ethan Lawan Dangtibiya	4 July 1992	NRC	Song	5 December 1992 – 17 November 1993	
—	Godwin Puldu	4 July 1992	NRC	Guyuk	5 December 1992 – 17 November 1993	
Akwa Ibom	Ekong Mex Umoh	4 July 1992	NRC	Mkpat Enin	5 December 1992 – 17 November 1993	
—	Uwem U. Uko	4 July 1992	NRC	Etinan	5 December 1992 – 17 November 1993	
—	Etim Etido Atakpa	4 July 1992	NRC	Essien Udim	5 December 1992 – 17 November 1993	
—	Nsikan Joseph Nyong	4 July 1992	NRC	Uyo	5 December 1992 – 17 November 1993	
—	Inana D. Akpan	4 July 1992	NRC	Ukanafun	5 December 1992 – 17 November 1993	
—	Okon Ita Essang	4 July 1992	NRC	Mbo	5 December 1992 – 17 November 1993	
—	Etim Edet Esin	4 July 1992	NRC	Oron	5 December 1992 – 17 November 1993	
—	Tony Mike Akpan	4 July 1992	SDP	Uruan	5 December 1992 – 17 November 1993	
—	Udom Sunday J.	4 July 1992	SDP	Oruk-Anam	5 December 1992 – 17 November 1993	
—	Aloysius Akpan Etok	4 July 1992	NRC	Ikono	5 December 1992 – 17 November 1993	
—	Obong Babs B. Udoewah	4 July 1992	NRC	Nsit-Ubium	5 December 1992 – 17 November 1993	
—	Dan Nkereuwem Okon	4 July 1992	SDP	Abak	5 December 1992 – 17 November 1993	
—	Udo Marcus Akpan	4 July 1992	NRC	Ikot Abasi	5 December 1992 – 17 November 1993	
—	Solomon Frank Abasiekong	4 July 1992	SDP	Ini	5 December 1992 – 17 November 1993	
—	Christine Akpan	4 July 1992	NRC	Itu	5 December 1992 – 17 November 1993	
—	Etukudo Jack Etukudo	4 July 1992	SDP	Onna	5 December 1992 – 17 November 1993	
—	Michael Lazarus Uwa	4 July 1992	NRC	Etim Ekpo	5 December 1992 – 17 November 1993	
—	David Nyong	4 July 1992	NRC	Ikot Ekpene	5 December 1992 – 17 November 1993	
—	Joseph S. Bassey	4 July 1992	SDP	Okobo	5 December 1992 – 17 November 1993	
—	Victor A. Okposin	4 July 1992	SDP	Eket	5 December 1992 – 17 November 1993	
—	Joseph Jimmy Ita	4 July 1992	NRC	Uqwa-Ibeno	5 December 1992 – 17 November 1993	
—	Gabriel Johnson Etuk	4 July 1992	NRC	Nsit Ibom	5 December 1992 – 17 November 1993	
—	Okon Bassey Etienam	4 July 1992	NRC	Urue-Ofon/Oruko	5 December 1992 – 17 November 1993	
—	Ubong O. Mbatt	4 July 1992	NRC	Ekpe Afai	5 December 1992 – 17 November 1993	
Anambra	Agunwa Anaekwe (Honourable Speaker)	4 July 1992	SDP	Anaocha	5 December 1992 – 17 November 1993	
—	Okechukwu Dave Umeano	4 July 1992	SDP	Oyi	5 December 1992 – 17 November 1993	
—	Philip Obiora Agbasi	4 July 1992	SDP	Nnewi South	5 December 1992 – 17 November 1993	
—	Ifeoma Olive Chinwuba	4 July 1992	SDP	Awka South	5 December 1992 – 17 November 1993	
—	Lawrence Arinze Abuah	4 July 1992	SDP	Onitsha North	5 December 1992 – 17 November 1993	
—	Nwankwo Nnabuochi	4 July 1992	SDP	Awka North	5 December 1992 – 17 November 1993	
—	Ezeobi Okpala	4 July 1992	SDP	Onitsha	5 December 1992 – 17 November 1993	
—	Francis Uchenna Okeke	4 July 1992	SDP	Aguata	5 December 1992 – 17 November 1993	
—	Obi Ikechukwu Anoliefo	4 July 1992	SDP	Idemili	5 December 1992 – 17 November 1993	
—	Ifeanyi Nwankwu	4 July 1992	SDP	Njikoka	5 December 1992 – 17 November 1993	
—	Ike Nnadozie Njudekwu	4 July 1992	NRC	Orumba North	5 December 1992 – 17 November 1993	
—	Ireanyi A. Udevi Auevoru	4 July 1992	SDP	Anambra	5 December 1992 – 17 November 1993	
—	Mike Ikoku	4 July 1992	SDP	Ihiala	5 December 1992 – 17 November 1993	
—	Celestine Obi Olisa	4 July 1992	SDP	Ogbaru	5 December 1992 – 17 November 1993	
—	John Obiora Ikechukwu	4 July 1992	NRC	Nnewi North	5 December 1992 – 17 November 1993	
—	Isaiah Obi	4 July 1992	SDP	Orumba South	5 December 1992 – 17 November 1993	
Bauchi	Ahmed Bappa Nafada	4 July 1992	NRC	Nafada	5 December 1992 – 17 November 1993	
—	Mamman Magaji	4 July 1992	NRC	Katagum	5 December 1992 – 17 November 1993	
—	Labaran Muhammed Inuwa	4 July 1992	NRC	Darazo	5 December 1992 – 17 November 1993	
—	Musa Jubrin Walai	4 July 1992	NRC	Itas/Gadau	5 December 1992 – 17 November 1993	
—	Abdulkadir Isiyaku Gwamna	4 July 1992	NRC	Gombe	5 December 1992 – 17 November 1993	
—	Mohammed A. Zabi	4 July 1992	NRC	Shira	5 December 1992 – 17 November 1993	
—	Yalwaji Mohammed Sakwa	4 July 1992	NRC	Zaki	5 December 1992 – 17 November 1993	
—	Jack G. Gumpy	4 July 1992	NRC	Balanga	5 December 1992 – 17 November 1993	
—	Isimila Mohammed	4 July 1992	NRC	Dukku	5 December 1992 – 17 November 1993	
—	Babayo Adamu Udubo	4 July 1992	NRC	Gamawa	5 December 1992 – 17 November 1993	
—	Ibrahim Kadiri	4 July 1992	SDP	Tafawa Balewa	5 December 1992 – 17 November 1993	
—	Umar Usman Lamido	4 July 1992	NRC	Akko	5 December 1992 – 17 November 1993	
—	Gigado Hassan Muhammed	4 July 1992	NRC	Jama'are	5 December 1992 – 17 November 1993	
—	Wada Tawar Umbi	4 July 1992	NRC	Billiri	5 December 1992 – 17 November 1993	
—	Adamu Lapidi Jalan	4 July 1992	NRC	Misau	5 December 1992 – 17 November 1993	
—	Idris Abdullahi Kufa	4 July 1992	NRC	Alkaleri	5 December 1992 – 17 November 1993	
—	Salihu Adamu	4 July 1992	NRC	Ningi	5 December 1992 – 17 November 1993	
—	Isa Yakubu Toro	4 July 1992	NRC	Toro	5 December 1992 – 17 November 1993	
—	Muhammed A. Wandi	4 July 1992	NRC	Dass	5 December 1992 – 17 November 1993	
—	Isa Musa Maton	4 July 1992	NRC	Bauchi	5 December 1992 – 17 November 1993	
—	Mohammad Kwadon	4 July 1992	NRC	Yamaltu/Deba	5 December 1992 – 17 November 1993	
—	Yahaya Mohammed Imam	4 July 1992	NRC	Ganjuwa	5 December 1992 – 17 November 1993	
—	Idris Abubakar	4 July 1992	NRC	Kaltungo	5 December 1992 – 17 November 1993	
Borno	Ibrahim Musa Bwala	4 July 1992	NRC	Hawul	5 December 1992 – 17 November 1993	
—	Tijani Mohammed Adam	4 July 1992	SDP	Marte	5 December 1992 – 17 November 1993	
—	Umar Mustapha	4 July 1992	NRC	Bama	5 December 1992 – 17 November 1993	
—	Bukar Modu Titiwa	4 July 1992	SDP	Magumeri	5 December 1992 – 17 November 1993	
—	Ularam Medugu	4 July 1992	SDP	Askira/Uba	5 December 1992 – 17 November 1993	
—	Usman M. Mafa	4 July 1992	SDP	Mafa	5 December 1992 – 17 November 1993	
—	Samson Y. Dibal Wandali	4 July 1992	SDP	Kwayakusar	5 December 1992 – 17 November 1993	
—	Mallum Sharang	4 July 1992	SDP	Shani	5 December 1992 – 17 November 1993	
—	Babagana Modu	4 July 1992	SDP	Nganzai	5 December 1992 – 17 November 1993	
—	Modu Mustapha Dikwa	4 July 1992	SDP	Dikwa	5 December 1992 – 17 November 1993	
—	Mohamed Bello	4 July 1992	SDP	Damboa	5 December 1992 – 17 November 1993	
—	Umar Kassim Ibrahim	4 July 1992	SDP	Biu	5 December 1992 – 17 November 1993	
—	Rabi Allamin	4 July 1992	SDP	Maiduguri	5 December 1992 – 17 November 1993	
—	Maina Mastapha Baga	4 July 1992	SDP	Kukawa	5 December 1992 – 17 November 1993	
—	M. Yakub Mohammed	4 July 1992	NRC	Kaga	5 December 1992 – 17 November 1993	
—	Mohammed Tahir Monguno	4 July 1992	SDP	Monguno	5 December 1992 – 17 November 1993	
—	Goni A. Ali	4 July 1992	SDP	Mobbar	5 December 1992 – 17 November 1993	
—	Mohammed Musa Tumala	4 July 1992	SDP	Gwoza	5 December 1992 – 17 November 1993	
—	Abba S. Gubio	4 July 1992	SDP	Gubio	5 December 1992 – 17 November 1993	
—	Kabir Lawan	4 July 1992	SDP	Ngala	5 December 1992 – 17 November 1993	
—	Dunoma Umara	4 July 1992	NRC	Konduga	5 December 1992 – 17 November 1993	
Cross River	Daniel Oza Bassey	4 July 1992	NRC	Abi	5 December 1992 – 17 November 1993	
—	Daniel Bassey Ekpenyong	4 July 1992	NRC	Akpabuyo	5 December 1992 – 17 November 1993	
—	Ofem Ikpi Ofem	4 July 1992	NRC	Yakurr	5 December 1992 – 17 November 1993	
—	Ibeshi Emmanuel Awhan	4 July 1992	SDP	Obudu	5 December 1992 – 17 November 1993	
—	Tangban Ayuk Ojong	4 July 1992	NRC	Ikom	5 December 1992 – 17 November 1993	
—	Moses Wonah Oko	4 July 1992	NRC	Ogoja	5 December 1992 – 17 November 1993	
—	Irek Eden Ernest	4 July 1992	NRC	Obubra	5 December 1992 – 17 November 1993	
—	Florence Ita-Giwa	4 July 1992	NRC	Calabar	5 December 1992 – 17 November 1993	
—	Ajah Ekpeni Obia	4 July 1992	SDP	Biase	5 December 1992 – 17 November 1993	
—	Ekpo Ekpo Okon	4 July 1992	NRC	Odukpani	5 December 1992 – 17 November 1993	
—	Chris Eriba	4 July 1992	SDP	Yala	5 December 1992 – 17 November 1993	
—	Augustine Ugar Ogogo	4 July 1992	SDP	Obanliku	5 December 1992 – 17 November 1993	
—	Denis Enyam Nkiri	4 July 1992	NRC	Akamkpa	5 December 1992 – 17 November 1993	
—	Oshita O. Oshita	4 July 1992	NRC	Boki	5 December 1992 – 17 November 1993	
Delta	Okpohworhu Ajoma Alfred	4 July 1992	SDP	Ughelli North	5 December 1992 – 17 November 1993	
—	Odhegolor Abikelegba Lucky	4 July 1992	SDP	Isoko North	5 December 1992 – 17 November 1993	
—	Edijala John Vote	4 July 1992	SDP	Ughelli South	5 December 1992 – 17 November 1993	
—	Kerry George Ikpeamanam	4 July 1992	SDP	Ika North-East	5 December 1992 – 17 November 1993	
—	Christopher Chiedu Ashibuogwu	4 July 1992	SDP	Aniocha South	5 December 1992 – 17 November 1993	
—	Chukwudi George Adigwe	4 July 1992	SDP	Aniocha North	5 December 1992 – 17 November 1993	
—	Edojah Solomon Odeyovwi	4 July 1992	SDP	Ethiope East	5 December 1992 – 17 November 1993	
—	Sam Osasa	4 July 1992	NRC	Ndokwa West	5 December 1992 – 17 November 1993	
—	Sunday Urunoghoresan Dabor	4 July 1992	SDP	Warri South	5 December 1992 – 17 November 1993	
—	Peter Y. Biakpara	4 July 1992	SDP	Burutu	5 December 1992 – 17 November 1993	
—	Uwadinisu Bernard Onyenokwe	4 July 1992	SDP	Ndokwa East	5 December 1992 – 17 November 1993	
—	Emeye Augustine Kim	4 July 1992	SDP	Ika South	5 December 1992 – 17 November 1993	
—	Gbegbaje-Das One	4 July 1992	NRC	Okpe	5 December 1992 – 17 November 1993	
—	Akangbou Edward Enarere Joseph	4 July 1992	SDP	Bomadi	5 December 1992 – 17 November 1993	
—	Omiretsule Jemide	4 July 1992	SDP	Warri North	5 December 1992 – 17 November 1993	
—	Godwin Ejoh	4 July 1992	SDP	Ethiope West	5 December 1992 – 17 November 1993	
—	Gordon Moses Ogbedobor	4 July 1992	SDP	Isoko South	5 December 1992 – 17 November 1993	
—	Edesi Sylvanus Azigbo	4 July 1992	SDP	Sapele	5 December 1992 – 17 November 1993	
Edo	Mike A. Orieso	4 July 1992	SDP	Esan South-East	5 December 1992 – 17 November 1993	
—	Ogedegbe Arthur Benedict Otaniyen	4 July 1992	SDP	Orhionmwon	5 December 1992 – 17 November 1993	
—	Ogona Daniel Ehimare	4 July 1992	SDP	Esan West	5 December 1992 – 17 November 1993	
—	Onaiwu Enoghado Giwa-Osagie	4 July 1992	SDP	Ovia North-East	5 December 1992 – 17 November 1993	
—	Aigbogun Ehizogie Patrick	4 July 1992	NRC	Esan Central	5 December 1992 – 17 November 1993	
—	Aigbo Khaevbo Harrison Onagbon	4 July 1992	SDP	Oria South-West	5 December 1992 – 17 November 1993	
—	Davidson Oputteh	4 July 1992	SDP	Etsako East	5 December 1992 – 17 November 1993	
—	Benedict E. A. Omiyi	4 July 1992	SDP	Esan North-East	5 December 1992 – 17 November 1993	
—	Samuel Ayo Sada	4 July 1992	SDP	Akoko-Edo	5 December 1992 – 17 November 1993	
—	Philip Ewan Folorunsho Edorhe	4 July 1992	SDP	Owan East	5 December 1992 – 17 November 1993	
—	Anthony Iyen	4 July 1992	SDP	Uhunmwode	5 December 1992 – 17 November 1993	
—	Ezekiel Oiseovbiomo Orhenvba	4 July 1992	SDP	Owan West	5 December 1992 – 17 November 1993	
—	Abdul-Rahman Kasiri	4 July 1992	SDP	Etsako West	5 December 1992 – 17 November 1993	
—	Ambrose Osawe	4 July 1992	SDP	Oredo	5 December 1992 – 17 November 1993	
Enugu	Nworie Amos	4 July 1992	NRC	Ikwo	5 December 1992 – 17 November 1993	
—	Mgbada Felix Nwigwe	4 July 1992	NRC	Ezza	5 December 1992 – 17 November 1993	
—	Chuka Ezema	4 July 1992	NRC	Igboeze South	5 December 1992 – 17 November 1993	
—	Ukwu Frank Uchenna	4 July 1992	NRC	Isi-Uzo	5 December 1992 – 17 November 1993	
—	Onyia Gideon Tony Dubem	4 July 1992	SDP	Enugu North	5 December 1992 – 17 November 1993	
—	Charles Onuora Ayalogu	4 July 1992	NRC	Udi	5 December 1992 – 17 November 1993	
—	Adum Matthias J. N	4 July 1992	SDP	Abakaliki	5 December 1992 – 17 November 1993	
—	Okechukwu Anselm Arumona	4 July 1992	NRC	Uzo-Uwani	5 December 1992 – 17 November 1993	
—	Iyi Samuel I.	4 July 1992	SDP	Ohaukwu	5 December 1992 – 17 November 1993	
—	Jonas Onyeka Chukwu	4 July 1992	NRC	Agwu	5 December 1992 – 17 November 1993	
—	Ikechukwu Ugwu C.	4 July 1992	NRC	Igboeze North	5 December 1992 – 17 November 1993	
—	Anayo Edeh	4 July 1992	NRC	Nkanu	5 December 1992 – 17 November 1993	
—	Cosmas C. Eziechi	4 July 1992	NRC	Ezeagu	5 December 1992 – 17 November 1993	
—	Nicko Agbo	4 July 1992	SDP	Enugu South	5 December 1992 – 17 November 1993	
—	Agbo Godwin Chukwuemeka	4 July 1992	NRC	Nsukka	5 December 1992 – 17 November 1993	
—	Isha Aramigbo Anthony	4 July 1992	SDP	Izzi	5 December 1992 – 17 November 1993	
—	Madueke C. Obi	4 July 1992	NRC	Oji River	5 December 1992 – 17 November 1993	
—	Chris Ptaka Nnadi	4 July 1992	NRC	Igbo Etiti	5 December 1992 – 17 November 1993	
Abuja	Ibrahim K. Mijindadi	4 July 1992	NRC	Gwagwalada	5 December 1992 – 17 November 1993	
—	Umoru Abdullai	4 July 1992	NRC	Abaji	5 December 1992 – 17 November 1993	
—	Gaza Lazarus Zuka	4 July 1992	SDP	Municipality	5 December 1992 – 17 November 1993	
—	Jacob E. Othman	4 July 1992	NRC	Kuje	5 December 1992 – 17 November 1993	
Imo	Ama Nwauwa	4 July 1992	NRC	Oguta	5 December 1992 – 17 November 1993	
—	Ibe Okechukwu	4 July 1992	NRC	Ideato North	5 December 1992 – 17 November 1993	
—	Ndubueze Patrick C.	4 July 1992	NRC	Okigwe	5 December 1992 – 17 November 1993	
—	Bonny Onunaenyi Uzoma	4 July 1992	NRC	Nkwerre	5 December 1992 – 17 November 1993	
—	Hilary Agim Ihenacho	4 July 1992	NRC	Orlu	5 December 1992 – 17 November 1993	
—	Basil O. Okafor	4 July 1992	NRC	Ihitte/Uboma	5 December 1992 – 17 November 1993	
—	Akubuo A. U.	4 July 1992	NRC	Isu	5 December 1992 – 17 November 1993	
—	Chris C. Asoluka	4 July 1992	NRC	Owerri	5 December 1992 – 17 November 1993	
—	Livinus M. Okereafor	4 July 1992	NRC	Ngor Okpala	5 December 1992 – 17 November 1993	
—	Ignatius Onyejekwe	4 July 1992	NRC	Orsu	5 December 1992 – 17 November 1993	
—	Ononuju Ernest	4 July 1992	NRC	Mbaitoli	5 December 1992 – 17 November 1993	
—	Ndugbu Columba	4 July 1992	NRC	Ahiazu	5 December 1992 – 17 November 1993	
—	Unaogu Abiaecheta Lazarus	4 July 1992	NRC	Ikeduru	5 December 1992 – 17 November 1993	
—	Amanfo Chukwuma Virginus	4 July 1992	NRC	Oru	5 December 1992 – 17 November 1993	
—	Amadi Chidi Paschal	4 July 1992	SDP	Aboh Mbaise	5 December 1992 – 17 November 1993	
—	Iwuchukwu Ambrose R. U.	4 July 1992	NRC	Ideato South	5 December 1992 – 17 November 1993	
—	Elias Osuagwu	4 July 1992	NRC	Ehime Mbano	5 December 1992 – 17 November 1993	
—	Okezie Jude Chimah	4 July 1992	SDP	Ezinihitte	5 December 1992 – 17 November 1993	
—	Festus N. Edomobi	4 July 1992	NRC	Obowu	5 December 1992 – 17 November 1993	
—	Mishael Obialo Mbaike	4 July 1992	NRC	Isiala Mbano	5 December 1992 – 17 November 1993	
—	Ekeordu Peter Lucky	4 July 1992	SDP	Ohaji Egbema	5 December 1992 – 17 November 1993	
Jigawa	Lili Garbari	4 July 1992	SDP	Jahun	5 December 1992 – 17 November 1993	
—	Sani Mahmoud	4 July 1992	NRC	Babura	5 December 1992 – 17 November 1993	
—	Yanusa Mohammed Baskuwa	4 July 1992	NRC	Kafin Hausa	5 December 1992 – 17 November 1993	
—	Ya'u Yakubu Kanya	4 July 1992	SDP	Birniwa	5 December 1992 – 17 November 1993	
—	Adamu Abdullahi Zabaro	4 July 1992	NRC	Hadejia	5 December 1992 – 17 November 1993	
—	Awaisu Hudu Sakwaya	4 July 1992	SDP	Dutse	5 December 1992 – 17 November 1993	
—	Isa Mohammed Garki	4 July 1992	SDP	Garki	5 December 1992 – 17 November 1993	
—	Nasiru Mohammed	4 July 1992	SDP	Gumel	5 December 1992 – 17 November 1993	
—	Ahmed Aliyu Maje	4 July 1992	SDP	Taura	5 December 1992 – 17 November 1993	
—	Shehu Adamu Kazaure	4 July 1992	SDP	Kazaure	5 December 1992 – 17 November 1993	
—	Mohammed Isa Gabarin	4 July 1992	SDP	Ringim	5 December 1992 – 17 November 1993	
—	Sirajo Ciroma Farindutse	4 July 1992	SDP	Gwaram	5 December 1992 – 17 November 1993	
—	Abubakar Imam Korayal	4 July 1992	SDP	Gwiwa	5 December 1992 – 17 November 1993	
—	Usman Mohammed Kiri-Kasamma	4 July 1992	SDP	Kiri-Kasamma	5 December 1992 – 17 November 1993	
—	Ma'aruf Mohammed Roni	4 July 1992	SDP	Roni	5 December 1992 – 17 November 1993	
—	Bishari Abdullahi	4 July 1992	SDP	Sule Tan-karkar	5 December 1992 – 17 November 1993	
—	Garba Iliyasu Damai	4 July 1992	SDP	Birnin Kudu	5 December 1992 – 17 November 1993	
—	Aminu Umaru Sidi	4 July 1992	SDP	Kaugama	5 December 1992 – 17 November 1993	
—	Ahmed Ahmed Safio	4 July 1992	SDP	Maigatari	5 December 1992 – 17 November 1993	
—	Ahmed Abdullahi	4 July 1992	SDP	Mull Mudori	5 December 1992 – 17 November 1993	
—	Sule Daini Aliyu	4 July 1992	SDP	Kiyawa	5 December 1992 – 17 November 1993	
Kaduna	Suleiman Tanimu	4 July 1992	NRC	Lere	5 December 1992 – 17 November 1993	
—	Zakariya J. Shamaki	4 July 1992	SDP	Kauru	5 December 1992 – 17 November 1993	
—	Mark Jacob Gadani	4 July 1992	SDP	Chikun	5 December 1992 – 17 November 1993	
—	Chanchok Caleb Audu	4 July 1992	SDP	Zangon Kataf	5 December 1992 – 17 November 1993	
—	Boniface I. Garba	4 July 1992	SDP	Jema'a	5 December 1992 – 17 November 1993	
—	Joseph Citta	4 July 1992	SDP	Kachia	5 December 1992 – 17 November 1993	
—	Zuwahu Victor Bello Ninyio	4 July 1992	SDP	Kaduna South	5 December 1992 – 17 November 1993	
—	Salihu Musa Auchan	4 July 1992	SDP	Ikara	5 December 1992 – 17 November 1993	
—	Bashiru Ibrahim Sakadabi	4 July 1992	SDP	Sabon Gari	5 December 1992 – 17 November 1993	
—	Jonathan Jatau Labi	4 July 1992	SDP	Kaura	5 December 1992 – 17 November 1993	
—	Magaji Tsoho Yakawada	4 July 1992	SDP	Giwa	5 December 1992 – 17 November 1993	
—	Dalhatu Maiwada Gimba	4 July 1992	NRC	Soba	5 December 1992 – 17 November 1993	
—	Ibrahim Mohammed	4 July 1992	NRC	Birnin Gwari	5 December 1992 – 17 November 1993	
—	Habibu Sani	4 July 1992	NRC	Igabi	5 December 1992 – 17 November 1993	
—	Edward Gamba	4 July 1992	SDP	Doka/Kawo	5 December 1992 – 17 November 1993	
—	Adamu Kuri Gwari	4 July 1992	NRC	Jaba	5 December 1992 – 17 November 1993	
—	Muhammadu Hussaini L.	4 July 1992	NRC	Igabi	5 December 1992 – 17 November 1993	
—	Abdulkadir Shehu Usman	4 July 1992	NRC	Zaria	5 December 1992 – 17 November 1993	
Kano	Sani Bala Dausara	4 July 1992	SDP	Yadakuwya	5 December 1992 – 17 November 1993	
—	Murtala Musa Bagwai	4 July 1992	NRC	Bagwai	5 December 1992 – 17 November 1993	
—	Sidi Mustapha Karaye	4 July 1992	NRC	Karaye	5 December 1992 – 17 November 1993	
—	Muhammed Hamisu Abubakar	4 July 1992	SDP	Tofa	5 December 1992 – 17 November 1993	
—	Abdul-azeez Adamu Gano	4 July 1992	NRC	Dawakin Kudu	5 December 1992 – 17 November 1993	
—	Mustapha B. Yunusa	4 July 1992	SDP	Tsanyawa	5 December 1992 – 17 November 1993	
—	Adamu Kaka Isangaya	4 July 1992	NRC	Albasu	5 December 1992 – 17 November 1993	
—	Isyaku A. Ali	4 July 1992	SDP	Gezawa	5 December 1992 – 17 November 1993	
—	Rabiu Musa Kwankwaso (Deputy Speaker)	4 July 1992	SDP	Madobi	5 December 1992 – 17 November 1993	
—	Balliya Alasau Dawanay	4 July 1992	SDP	Dawakin Tofa	5 December 1992 – 17 November 1993	
—	Tafida Nainna Danbatta	4 July 1992	NRC	Danbatta	5 December 1992 – 17 November 1993	
—	Ya'u Tsoho Zakirai	4 July 1992	NRC	Gabasawa	5 December 1992 – 17 November 1993	
—	Suleiman Abdullahi	4 July 1992	NRC	Rimin Gado	5 December 1992 – 17 November 1993	
—	Umar Faruk Husaini Gwarzo	4 July 1992	SDP	Gwarzo	5 December 1992 – 17 November 1993	
—	Nura Mohammed Dankadai	4 July 1992	NRC	Tudun Wada	5 December 1992 – 17 November 1993	
—	Shehu Ibrahim Zimit	4 July 1992	SDP	Dala	5 December 1992 – 17 November 1993	
—	Nasiru Halliru	4 July 1992	NRC	Warawa	5 December 1992 – 17 November 1993	
—	Mohammed Aminu Inuwa	4 July 1992	NRC	Gaya	5 December 1992 – 17 November 1993	
—	Musa Issau Kibiya Rano	4 July 1992	SDP	Rano	5 December 1992 – 17 November 1993	
—	Rufai Sani Hanga	4 July 1992	SDP	Kumbotso	5 December 1992 – 17 November 1993	
—	Yusuf B. Kuki	4 July 1992	NRC	Bebeji	5 December 1992 – 17 November 1993	
—	Murtala Mohammed Hotoro	4 July 1992	SDP	Nassarawa	5 December 1992 – 17 November 1993	
—	Alhassan Ado Dadin kowa	4 July 1992	SDP	Doguna	5 December 1992 – 17 November 1993	
—	Nasiru Bau Durbande	4 July 1992	NRC	Takai	5 December 1992 – 17 November 1993	
—	Bala Salisu Kosawa	4 July 1992	SDP	Kura	5 December 1992 – 17 November 1993	
—	Suleiman Abdullahi	4 July 1992	NRC	R/Gado	5 December 1992 – 17 November 1993	
—	Aminu Sule Garo	4 July 1992	NRC	Kiru	5 December 1992 – 17 November 1993	
—	Nuhu Sa'ad Sarina	4 July 1992	NRC	Wudil	5 December 1992 – 17 November 1993	
—	Mohammadu A. Ibrahim Gwaneri	4 July 1992	SDP	Bunkure	5 December 1992 – 17 November 1993	
—	Aliyu Ahmed Yako	4 July 1992	SDP	Kiru	5 December 1992 – 17 November 1993	
—	Sani Aliyu	4 July 1992	SDP	—	5 December 1992 – 17 November 1993	
—	Wada Yola	4 July 1992	SDP	Kano Municipality	5 December 1992 – 17 November 1993	
—	Musa Sulaiman Shanono	4 July 1992	NRC	Shanono	5 December 1992 – 17 November 1993	
—	Jibo Ishaku Gasgena	4 July 1992	NRC	Kingibir	5 December 1992 – 17 November 1993	
Katsina	Mustapha Bature Sani	4 July 1992	NRC	Batsari	5 December 1992 – 17 November 1993	
—	Kabir Jibrin Tandama	4 July 1992	NRC	Danja	5 December 1992 – 17 November 1993	
—	Bashi Danjuma	4 July 1992	NRC	Kurfi	5 December 1992 – 17 November 1993	
—	Bala Aliyu Kuki	4 July 1992	SDP	Dutsin-Ma	5 December 1992 – 17 November 1993	
—	Tukur Bello Kankara	4 July 1992	NRC	Kankara	5 December 1992 – 17 November 1993	
—	Aminu Lawal Zango	4 July 1992	SDP	Zango	5 December 1992 – 17 November 1993	
—	Kallah Yahaya Kayawa	4 July 1992	NRC	Mashi	5 December 1992 – 17 November 1993	
—	Umar Adamu	4 July 1992	SDP	Rimi	5 December 1992 – 17 November 1993	
—	Garba Sule Tabanni	4 July 1992	NRC	Musawa	5 December 1992 – 17 November 1993	
—	Kabir Abdullahi Danmusa	4 July 1992	NRC	Safana	5 December 1992 – 17 November 1993	
—	Abdu Umar Yandoma	4 July 1992	SDP	Ingawa	5 December 1992 – 17 November 1993	
—	Ahmed Bukar Magaji	4 July 1992	NRC	Maidaduwa	5 December 1992 – 17 November 1993	
—	Jafaru A. Balarabe	4 July 1992	NRC	Faskari	5 December 1992 – 17 November 1993	
—	Adamu Sule Jibia	4 July 1992	SDP	Jibia	5 December 1992 – 17 November 1993	
—	Ibrahim Saidu Malumfashi	4 July 1992	NRC	Malumfashi	5 December 1992 – 17 November 1993	
—	Isah Aliyu Mahuta	4 July 1992	NRC	Funtua	5 December 1992 – 17 November 1993	
—	Mariya I. Abdullahi	4 July 1992	NRC	Bakori	5 December 1992 – 17 November 1993	
—	Dahiru Dayyabu	4 July 1992	NRC	Kafur	5 December 1992 – 17 November 1993	
—	Badaru Hashim Matazu	4 July 1992	NRC	Matazu	5 December 1992 – 17 November 1993	
—	Mohammed Lawal Samaila	4 July 1992	NRC	Katsina	5 December 1992 – 17 November 1993	
—	Samaila Lado	4 July 1992	NRC	Kankai	5 December 1992 – 17 November 1993	
—	Ahmed Abubakar Bindawa	4 July 1992	NRC	Bindawa	5 December 1992 – 17 November 1993	
—	Mohammed Lawal Nalado	4 July 1992	NRC	Daura	5 December 1992 – 17 November 1993	
—	Idris Alti Kaita	4 July 1992	NRC	Kaita	5 December 1992 – 17 November 1993	
—	Abdulrahman Usman	4 July 1992	NRC	Batagarawa	5 December 1992 – 17 November 1993	
—	Bashiru Isa Mani	4 July 1992	SDP	Mani	5 December 1992 – 17 November 1993	
Kebbi	Garba Ahmed Giro	4 July 1992	NRC	Suru	5 December 1992 – 17 November 1993	
—	Abdullahi Bena	4 July 1992	NRC	Wasagu	5 December 1992 – 17 November 1993	
—	Samaila Nabame	4 July 1992	NRC	Argungu	5 December 1992 – 17 November 1993	
—	Umar Abdullahi Yelwa	4 July 1992	NRC	Yauri	5 December 1992 – 17 November 1993	
—	Musa Garba Fana	4 July 1992	NRC	Dandi	5 December 1992 – 17 November 1993	
—	Ibrahim Mohammed Marafa	4 July 1992	NRC	Dabai/Fakai	5 December 1992 – 17 November 1993	
—	Ibrahim Abubakar Kangiwa	4 July 1992	NRC	Arewa	5 December 1992 – 17 November 1993	
—	Muhammadu Sirajo Aliyu	4 July 1992	NRC	Birnin Kebbi	5 December 1992 – 17 November 1993	
—	Mohammed A. Bawa Karaye	4 July 1992	NRC	Mayiyama	5 December 1992 – 17 November 1993	
—	Ibrahim A. Gwandu	4 July 1992	NRC	Gwandu	5 December 1992 – 17 November 1993	
—	Saidu Mohammed Kimba	4 July 1992	NRC	Jega	5 December 1992 – 17 November 1993	
—	Mudi Abubakar Musa	4 July 1992	NRC	Ngaski	5 December 1992 – 17 November 1993	
—	Ahmed Abubakar Diggi	4 July 1992	NRC	Bunza	5 December 1992 – 17 November 1993	
—	Manke Aize Isa	4 July 1992	NRC	Sakaba	5 December 1992 – 17 November 1993	
—	Usman Muhammed Madacci	4 July 1992	NRC	Koko Besse	5 December 1992 – 17 November 1993	
—	Farouk Sillah	4 July 1992	NRC	—	5 December 1992 – 17 November 1993	
Kogi	Agamah Philip Audu	4 July 1992	NRC	Ofu	5 December 1992 – 17 November 1993	
—	Jimoh Abdul Akpoti	4 July 1992	SDP	Okehi	5 December 1992 – 17 November 1993	
—	Salihu Ohikwo Shaibu	4 July 1992	NRC	Koton-Karfi	5 December 1992 – 17 November 1993	
—	Musa Sule Dauda Kam Salem	4 July 1992	SDP	Lokoja	5 December 1992 – 17 November 1993	
—	M. I. Ayeni	4 July 1992	NRC	Yagba	5 December 1992 – 17 November 1993	
—	Abdullahi Sadiq	4 July 1992	SDP	Adavi	5 December 1992 – 17 November 1993	
—	Sadiq A. Mohammed	4 July 1992	SDP	Ajaokuta	5 December 1992 – 17 November 1993	
—	Baba Danladi Atta	4 July 1992	NRC	Dekina	5 December 1992 – 17 November 1993	
—	Michael Omale Ogabor	4 July 1992	NRC	Olamaboro	5 December 1992 – 17 November 1993	
—	Kayode Ige	4 July 1992	NRC	Yagba West	5 December 1992 – 17 November 1993	
—	Ogba Linus Mohammed	4 July 1992	NRC	Ankpa	5 December 1992 – 17 November 1993	
—	Olorunleke Olukayode Anthony	4 July 1992	NRC	Kabba/Bunu	5 December 1992 – 17 November 1993	
—	Salihu Ndanusa Dauda	4 July 1992	NRC	Bassa	5 December 1992 – 17 November 1993	
—	Abiodun Obafemi	4 July 1992	SDP	Ijumu	5 December 1992 – 17 November 1993	
—	Usman Asuku Sule-Otu	4 July 1992	SDP	Okene	5 December 1992 – 17 November 1993	
—	Aunka Emmanuel Uchola	4 July 1992	SDP	Idah	5 December 1992 – 17 November 1993	
Kwara	Abraham Ajiboye A. Ashaolu	4 July 1992	SDP	Ekiti	5 December 1992 – 17 November 1993	
—	Gene Abubakar Kolo	4 July 1992	SDP	Kaiama	5 December 1992 – 17 November 1993	
—	Bukoye Timothy Kolawole Ademola	4 July 1992	SDP	Offa	5 December 1992 – 17 November 1993	
—	Suleman Oba Olola	4 July 1992	SDP	Ilorin West	5 December 1992 – 17 November 1993	
—	Ishola Julius Bamidele	4 July 1992	SDP	Irepodun	5 December 1992 – 17 November 1993	
—	Sulaiman Ahman Patigi	4 July 1992	SDP	Edu	5 December 1992 – 17 November 1993	
—	Ishola Balogun	4 July 1992	SDP	Ilorin East	5 December 1992 – 17 November 1993	
—	Abubakar Sero Idris	4 July 1992	SDP	Baruten	5 December 1992 – 17 November 1993	
—	Isiaka Afolabi	4 July 1992	SDP	Moro	5 December 1992 – 17 November 1993	
—	I. O. Abubakar	4 July 1992	SDP	Ifelodun	5 December 1992 – 17 November 1993	
—	Elias Wole Muda	4 July 1992	SDP	Asa	5 December 1992 – 17 November 1993	
—	Yakeen Olayinka Alabi	4 July 1992	SDP	Oyun	5 December 1992 – 17 November 1993	
Lagos	Raheem S. Alawaiye	4 July 1992	SDP	Surulere	5 December 1992 – 17 November 1993	
—	Adedayo Adedini	4 July 1992	SDP	Mushin	5 December 1992 – 17 November 1993	
—	Olufemi Lanlehin	4 July 1992	SDP	Ikeja	5 December 1992 – 17 November 1993	
—	Omotilewa Aro-Lambo	4 July 1992	SDP	Lagos Island	5 December 1992 – 17 November 1993	
—	E. A. Kolajo	4 July 1992	SDP	Agege	5 December 1992 – 17 November 1993	
—	Abimbola Adewunmi Adegbesan	4 July 1992	SDP	Oshodi/Isolo	5 December 1992 – 17 November 1993	
—	Museli Oguntoye Mustapha	4 July 1992	SDP	Ikorodu	5 December 1992 – 17 November 1993	
—	Abubakar Babs Akinlolu	4 July 1992	SDP	Eti-Osa	5 December 1992 – 17 November 1993	
—	Suarau Kabiru Akanbi	4 July 1992	SDP	Ojo	5 December 1992 – 17 November 1993	
—	Adebayo Ola Amure	4 July 1992	SDP	Epe	5 December 1992 – 17 November 1993	
—	Logun Wasiu Olorunosenkanti	4 July 1992	NRC	Ibeju/Lekki	5 December 1992 – 17 November 1993	
—	Kosoko Oladele Idris	4 July 1992	SDP	Badagry	5 December 1992 – 17 November 1993	
—	Olufemi Ikuomola	4 July 1992	SDP	Alimosho	5 December 1992 – 17 November 1993	
—	Wunmi Lasisi	4 July 1992	SDP	Shomolu	5 December 1992 – 17 November 1993	
—	Tokunbo Afikuyomi	4 July 1992	SDP	Lagos Mainland	5 December 1992 – 17 November 1993	
Niger	Abdu Aliyu Auna Mafillata	4 July 1992	NRC	Magama	5 December 1992 – 17 November 1993	
—	Mohammed Saleh	4 July 1992	NRC	Rijau	5 December 1992 – 17 November 1993	
—	Bala Yahaya Bello	4 July 1992	NRC	Paikoro	5 December 1992 – 17 November 1993	
—	Hajara L. Usman	4 July 1992	NRC	Rafi	5 December 1992 – 17 November 1993	
—	Zachariah Adamu Dikko	4 July 1992	NRC	Gurara	5 December 1992 – 17 November 1993	
—	Abubakar Sulaiman Kpautagi	4 July 1992	NRC	Mokwa	5 December 1992 – 17 November 1993	
—	Umaru Bagudu	4 July 1992	NRC	Lapai	5 December 1992 – 17 November 1993	
—	Abdullahi Mohammadu Sani	4 July 1992	NRC	Mariga	5 December 1992 – 17 November 1993	
—	Dahiru Awaisu Kuta	4 July 1992	SDP	Minna -Chanchaga	5 December 1992 – 17 November 1993	
—	Usman Ladan	4 July 1992	NRC	Agaie	5 December 1992 – 17 November 1993	
—	Usman Dawuda Kutigi	4 July 1992	NRC	Lavun	5 December 1992 – 17 November 1993	
—	Tanko Yusuf J. B.	4 July 1992	NRC	Bosso	5 December 1992 – 17 November 1993	
—	Aliyu Mohammed Saidu	4 July 1992	NRC	Shiroro	5 December 1992 – 17 November 1993	
—	Tanko Mohammed Lokoja	4 July 1992	NRC	Suleja	5 December 1992 – 17 November 1993	
—	Mustapha I. Lemu	4 July 1992	NRC	Gbako	5 December 1992 – 17 November 1993	
—	Aliyu Mohammed Halidu	4 July 1992	NRC	Agwara	5 December 1992 – 17 November 1993	
—	M. K. Ahmed	4 July 1992	NRC	Bida	5 December 1992 – 17 November 1993	
—	Musa Yellow M. IBBI	4 July 1992	NRC	Wushishi	5 December 1992 – 17 November 1993	
—	Abdullahi Issah	4 July 1992	NRC	Borgu	5 December 1992 – 17 November 1993	
Ogun	George Afolabi Ibirinde	4 July 1992	SDP	Egbado South	5 December 1992 – 17 November 1993	
—	Anuola Ajose	4 July 1992	SDP	Ado- Odo/Ota	5 December 1992 – 17 November 1993	
—	Bisiriyu Adebayo Popoola	4 July 1992	SDP	Egbado North	5 December 1992 – 17 November 1993	
—	Olabisi Olatun Abiola	4 July 1992	SDP	Abeokuta South	5 December 1992 – 17 November 1993	
—	Ogundipe Israel Adisa	4 July 1992	SDP	Odeda	5 December 1992 – 17 November 1993	
—	Adekunle Adesina	4 July 1992	SDP	Abeokuta North	5 December 1992 – 17 November 1993	
—	Adegbenro Adesina M. A.	4 July 1992	SDP	Ifo	5 December 1992 – 17 November 1993	
—	Kayode Kasimawo Akinsanya	4 July 1992	SDP	Sagamu	5 December 1992 – 17 November 1993	
—	Lawal Remi	4 July 1992	SDP	Ijebu-Ode	5 December 1992 – 17 November 1993	
—	Segun Seriki	4 July 1992	SDP	Ijebu North	5 December 1992 – 17 November 1993	
—	Ayodele Rafiu Tekun	4 July 1992	SDP	Ogun Waterside	5 December 1992 – 17 November 1993	
—	Olawale Oshun	4 July 1992	SDP	Ijebu East	5 December 1992 – 17 November 1993	
—	Odunsanya Olayide Francis	4 July 1992	SDP	Odogbolu	5 December 1992 – 17 November 1993	
—	Ladeinde B. A.	4 July 1992	SDP	Obafemi/Owode	5 December 1992 – 17 November 1993	
—	Oladipupo O. Adebutu	4 July 1992	SDP	Ikene	5 December 1992 – 17 November 1993	
Ondo	Korede Duyile	4 July 1992	SDP	Idanre	5 December 1992 – 17 November 1993	
—	Olanusi Alli Olaganju	4 July 1992	SDP	Akoko South	5 December 1992 – 17 November 1993	
—	J. O. Ajayi	4 July 1992	SDP	Moba	5 December 1992 – 17 November 1993	
—	Ogunbameru D. A.	4 July 1992	SDP	Okitipupa	5 December 1992 – 17 November 1993	
—	Wilson Rotimi Dennis	4 July 1992	SDP	Odigbo	5 December 1992 – 17 November 1993	
—	Emmanuel Bayo Ajayi	4 July 1992	SDP	Ikere	5 December 1992 – 17 November 1993	
—	Ronald Olu Ogunleye	4 July 1992	SDP	Akure	5 December 1992 – 17 November 1993	
—	Akawa George Tunji	4 July 1992	SDP	Ado-Ekiti	5 December 1992 – 17 November 1993	
—	James Olasehinde Esan	4 July 1992	SDP	Emure-Ise-Orun	5 December 1992 – 17 November 1993	
—	George Eniolorunda Famodimu	4 July 1992	NRC	Eketi West	5 December 1992 – 17 November 1993	
—	Aboluwodu Adesunloye E.	4 July 1992	SDP	Ose	5 December 1992 – 17 November 1993	
—	Akintoye J. O.	4 July 1992	NRC	Ekiti South-West	5 December 1992 – 17 November 1993	
—	Olatunde John	4 July 1992	NRC	Eketi East	5 December 1992 – 17 November 1993	
—	Adeola Alofe	4 July 1992	SDP	Ido-Osi	5 December 1992 – 17 November 1993	
—	Saliu O. Yusuf	4 July 1992	SDP	Owo	5 December 1992 – 17 November 1993	
—	Paul Oguntimehin	4 July 1992	SDP	Akoko North-West	5 December 1992 – 17 November 1993	
—	Alomoge P. I.	4 July 1992	SDP	Irepodum/Ifelodum	5 December 1992 – 17 November 1993	
—	Ige E. Ropo	4 July 1992	SDP	Ijero	5 December 1992 – 17 November 1993	
—	Olatunji Adedapo Adeyeni	4 July 1992	SDP	Ikole	5 December 1992 – 17 November 1993	
—	Oke Alex Olusola	4 July 1992	SDP	Ilaje/Esw-Odo	5 December 1992 – 17 November 1993	
—	Doyin Omololu	4 July 1992	SDP	Irele	5 December 1992 – 17 November 1993	
—	Olufemi Akinbobola	4 July 1992	SDP	Ile-Oluji/Okeigbo	5 December 1992 – 17 November 1993	
—	Bademosi Kadejo Adedayo	4 July 1992	SDP	Ondo	5 December 1992 – 17 November 1993	
—	Kazeem Rashid Olanrewaju	4 July 1992	SDP	Akoko North-East	5 December 1992 – 17 November 1993	
—	Mike Jimi Oke	4 July 1992	SDP	Oye	5 December 1992 – 17 November 1993	
—	Samuel Abiodun Ajisafe	4 July 1992	SDP	Ifedore	5 December 1992 – 17 November 1993	
Osun	Oloyede Oyekunle Ajiboye	4 July 1992	NRC	Ife North	5 December 1992 – 17 November 1993	
—	Oladimeji Olumuyiwa Johnson Adeleke	4 July 1992	SDP	Olorunda	5 December 1992 – 17 November 1993	
—	Benedict Aderemi Olaniyan	4 July 1992	SDP	Ila	5 December 1992 – 17 November 1993	
—	Olatundun Moses Adeleke	4 July 1992	SDP	Boripe	5 December 1992 – 17 November 1993	
—	Komolafe Isaiah Oluyemi	4 July 1992	SDP	Atakunmosa	5 December 1992 – 17 November 1993	
—	Oyewunmi Kamorudeen Olalere	4 July 1992	SDP	Irewole	5 December 1992 – 17 November 1993	
—	Ezekiel Oladejo Fakayode	4 July 1992	SDP	Ifedayo	5 December 1992 – 17 November 1993	
—	Olaoye Moses Niniola	4 July 1992	SDP	Odo-Otin	5 December 1992 – 17 November 1993	
—	Oguntola Mudasiru Toogun	4 July 1992	SDP	Iwo	5 December 1992 – 17 November 1993	
—	Oyesiji Elijah Oyebamiji	4 July 1992	SDP	Ola-Oluwa	5 December 1992 – 17 November 1993	
—	Fasogbon John Olawole	4 July 1992	SDP	Ife Central	5 December 1992 – 17 November 1993	
—	Olayiwola Adebiyi	4 July 1992	SDP	Ife South	5 December 1992 – 17 November 1993	
—	Samuel Akinbinu Akinyele	4 July 1992	SDP	Oriade	5 December 1992 – 17 November 1993	
—	Bamiduro Raphad Kolapo	4 July 1992	SDP	Ayedire	5 December 1992 – 17 November 1993	
—	Abioye Oyetunji	4 July 1992	SDP	Ifelodun	5 December 1992 – 17 November 1993	
—	Adewale Muibi Popoola	4 July 1992	SDP	Osogbo	5 December 1992 – 17 November 1993	
—	Titus Oladosie Fatokun	4 July 1992	SDP	Obokun	5 December 1992 – 17 November 1993	
—	Nimola Bolade Sarumi	4 July 1992	SDP	Ilesha	5 December 1992 – 17 November 1993	
—	I. Adekunle Jaiyeola	4 July 1992	SDP	Ejigbo	5 December 1992 – 17 November 1993	
—	Oyegbile Rufus Adeyemo	4 July 1992	SDP	Erepodun	5 December 1992 – 17 November 1993	
—	Abimbola Opawuyi	4 July 1992	SDP	Ayepaade	5 December 1992 – 17 November 1993	
—	A. Tajudeen Lawal	4 July 1992	SDP	Ede	5 December 1992 – 17 November 1993	
—	Akinwale Oyewale Ojetunmobi	4 July 1992	SDP	Egbedire	5 December 1992 – 17 November 1993	
Oyo	Owolabi-Olakulehin Akinloye	4 July 1992	SDP	Ibadan South-East	5 December 1992 – 17 November 1993	
—	Akanbi Rilwan Adesoji	4 July 1992	SDP	Ibadan North-West	5 December 1992 – 17 November 1993	
—	Tunde Oloyede	4 July 1992	SDP	Ifeloju	5 December 1992 – 17 November 1993	
—	Adebayo Muneer Aderemi	4 July 1992	SDP	Lagelu	5 December 1992 – 17 November 1993	
—	Peter Olaoye Adepoju	4 July 1992	SDP	Oloyole	5 December 1992 – 17 November 1993	
—	Oyewale Amos Gbemisoye	4 July 1992	NRC	Surulere	5 December 1992 – 17 November 1993	
—	Younous Tunde Kakako	4 July 1992	SDP	Ifedapo	5 December 1992 – 17 November 1993	
—	M. J. Ajayi Ahmed	4 July 1992	SDP	Irepo	5 December 1992 – 17 November 1993	
—	Samson Lekan Latinwo	4 July 1992	SDP	Ibadan South-West	5 December 1992 – 17 November 1993	
—	Akinremi Johnson Olusegun	4 July 1992	SDP	Ona-Are	5 December 1992 – 17 November 1993	
—	Oyedeji Solomon Olubunmi	4 July 1992	SDP	Ibadan North-East	5 December 1992 – 17 November 1993	
—	Oladejo Oladeji	4 July 1992	SDP	Egbeda	5 December 1992 – 17 November 1993	
—	Adebayo Adewale Musibau	4 July 1992	SDP	Oyo	5 December 1992 – 17 November 1993	
—	Oladejo Moses Olabanji	4 July 1992	SDP	Akinyele	5 December 1992 – 17 November 1993	
—	Samuel Olusiji Oyinlola	4 July 1992	SDP	Ibarapa	5 December 1992 – 17 November 1993	
—	Adisa Oladipo Nureni	4 July 1992	SDP	Ido	5 December 1992 – 17 November 1993	
—	Mudathir Sekoni	4 July 1992	NRC	Orelope	5 December 1992 – 17 November 1993	
—	Nicholas Ojo-Alokomaro	4 July 1992	SDP	Ogbomoso South	5 December 1992 – 17 November 1993	
—	Oyelakin James Ayodeji	4 July 1992	SDP	Ogo-Oluwa	5 December 1992 – 17 November 1993	
—	Thomas Teju Oke	4 July 1992	SDP	Ogbomoso North	5 December 1992 – 17 November 1993	
—	Oyebanji Olasukanmi Adeleke	4 July 1992	SDP	Afijio	5 December 1992 – 17 November 1993	
—	Adekunle Olukayode	4 July 1992	SDP	Orire	5 December 1992 – 17 November 1993	
—	Suara Abdul-Waheed Tunde	4 July 1992	SDP	Ibadan North	5 December 1992 – 17 November 1993	
—	Taiwo Dominic Olalere	4 July 1992	SDP	Kajola	5 December 1992 – 17 November 1993	
—	Adegbola Mufutau Ademola	4 July 1992	NRC	Iseyin	5 December 1992 – 17 November 1993	
Plateau	Abdullahi Mohammed Kani Wuse	4 July 1992	SDP	Awe	5 December 1992 – 17 November 1993	
—	Dongs Duncil Tyem	4 July 1992	SDP	Langtang South	5 December 1992 – 17 November 1993	
—	James Oga Ajason Ajamia	4 July 1992	SDP	Karu	5 December 1992 – 17 November 1993	
—	Johnson J. Zogore	4 July 1992	SDP	Bassa	5 December 1992 – 17 November 1993	
—	Yakubu Usman Shehu	4 July 1992	SDP	Kanam	5 December 1992 – 17 November 1993	
—	Hassan Danladi	4 July 1992	SDP	Keffi	5 December 1992 – 17 November 1993	
—	Dashe Amos Silas	4 July 1992	SDP	Langtang North	5 December 1992 – 17 November 1993	
—	Gobum Benka Suwa	4 July 1992	SDP	Pankshin	5 December 1992 – 17 November 1993	
—	Michael Bukwal	4 July 1992	SDP	Shendam	5 December 1992 – 17 November 1993	
—	James Fyakfu Bakfur	4 July 1992	SDP	Mangu	5 December 1992 – 17 November 1993	
—	Ibrahim Idi Waziri	4 July 1992	NRC	Wase	5 December 1992 – 17 November 1993	
—	Damian Daloeng	4 July 1992	SDP	Qua'an-Pan	5 December 1992 – 17 November 1993	
—	Musa Sanda	4 July 1992	SDP	Lafia	5 December 1992 – 17 November 1993	
—	Davou S. B. Gyel	4 July 1992	SDP	Jos South	5 December 1992 – 17 November 1993	
—	Amina Mohammed Aliyu	4 July 1992	SDP	Akwanga	5 December 1992 – 17 November 1993	
—	James_Vwi_portrait	James Vwi	4 July 1992	SDP	Barkin Ladi	5 December 1992 – 17 November 1993
—	Danjuma Alkali	4 July 1992	NRC	Toko	5 December 1992 – 17 November 1993	
—	Abe A. Usman	4 July 1992	SDP	Obi	5 December 1992 – 17 November 1993	
—	Alfred Iliya Sagai	4 July 1992	SDP	Bokkos	5 December 1992 – 17 November 1993	
—	Ogah Alex Ewolo	4 July 1992	SDP	Nassarawa	5 December 1992 – 17 November 1993	
—	Abims A. Ebyei	4 July 1992	SDP	Nassarawa Eggon	5 December 1992 – 17 November 1993	
—	Aminu Agwom Zang	4 July 1992	SDP	Jos North	5 December 1992 – 17 November 1993	
—	Umaru Salihu Ogah	4 July 1992	NRC	Doma	5 December 1992 – 17 November 1993	
Rivers	Chris I. Chuama	4 July 1992	NRC	Okrika	5 December 1992 – 17 November 1993	
—	Kpandei Loveday Baribor	4 July 1992	NRC	Gokana	5 December 1992 – 17 November 1993	
—	Chris Alaye Don Pedro	4 July 1992	NRC	Akuku-Toru	5 December 1992 – 17 November 1993	
—	Imegwu Nnabuihe	4 July 1992	SDP	Oyigbo	5 December 1992 – 17 November 1993	
—	E. M. Sam-Eligwe	4 July 1992	NRC	Ahoda	5 December 1992 – 17 November 1993	
—	Agbedi Yeitiemone Frederick	4 July 1992	NRC	Ekeremor	5 December 1992 – 17 November 1993	
—	Ibiama Ibifuro Anye	4 July 1992	SDP	Bonny	5 December 1992 – 17 November 1993	
—	Friday Josiah Abigo	4 July 1992	NRC	Abua/Odual	5 December 1992 – 17 November 1993	
—	Samuel Lucky Onwuzirike Oluo	4 July 1992	NRC	Etche	5 December 1992 – 17 November 1993	
—	Igwe Mbombo Fred	4 July 1992	NRC	Tai-Eleme	5 December 1992 – 17 November 1993	
—	Angolia Aboko	4 July 1992	NRC	Degema	5 December 1992 – 17 November 1993	
—	Bolere Elizabeth Ketebu	4 July 1992	NRC	Yenagoa	5 December 1992 – 17 November 1993	
—	John Chukwuma Imegi	4 July 1992	NRC	Ogba/Egbema/Ndoni	5 December 1992 – 17 November 1993	
—	Basilo Michael	4 July 1992	NRC	Ogbia	5 December 1992 – 17 November 1993	
—	Syder Nnodim	4 July 1992	NRC	Emohua	5 December 1992 – 17 November 1993	
—	Enyindah Ibenyenwo	4 July 1992	NRC	Ikwerre	5 December 1992 – 17 November 1993	
—	Felix Achinike Igwe	4 July 1992	NRC	Obio/Akpor	5 December 1992 – 17 November 1993	
—	Telimoye M. Oguara	4 July 1992	NRC	Brass	5 December 1992 – 17 November 1993	
—	Sampson Gilbert Egop	4 July 1992	NRC	Andoni/Opobo	5 December 1992 – 17 November 1993	
—	Arthur Chidebe Kalagbor	4 July 1992	SDP	Port-Harcourt	5 December 1992 – 17 November 1993	
—	Paworiso Samuel Horsefall	4 July 1992	NRC	Aswa-Toun	5 December 1992 – 17 November 1993	
—	Eddie Esinkumo Ogoun	4 July 1992	NRC	Sidga	5 December 1992 – 17 November 1993	
—	Linus Lebari Kpabari	4 July 1992	NRC	Khana	5 December 1992 – 17 November 1993	
—	Gushi F. A. Toun-Aregha	4 July 1992	NRC	Sugbama	5 December 1992 – 17 November 1993	
Sokoto	Abdullahi A. A. Zurmi	4 July 1992	NRC	Zurmi	5 December 1992 – 17 November 1993	
—	Mohammed Dan-Ige Yabo	4 July 1992	NRC	Yabo	5 December 1992 – 17 November 1993	
—	Bala Aminu Alhaji	4 July 1992	NRC	Sokoto	5 December 1992 – 17 November 1993	
—	Muhammadu Maikudi Kaya	4 July 1992	NRC	Maradun	5 December 1992 – 17 November 1993	
—	Bala Umar Mahe	4 July 1992	NRC	Kaura-Namoda	5 December 1992 – 17 November 1993	
—	Haruna Dauda Sabon-Birni	4 July 1992	NRC	Sabon Birni	5 December 1992 – 17 November 1993	
—	Abdullahi Mohammed Binji	4 July 1992	NRC	Binji	5 December 1992 – 17 November 1993	
—	Abdulkadir Kado Mayaura Gusau	4 July 1992	NRC	Gusau	5 December 1992 – 17 November 1993	
—	Muhammed Usman	4 July 1992	NRC	Bukkuyum	5 December 1992 – 17 November 1993	
—	Abubakar Aliya Gumbi	4 July 1992	NRC	Wammako	5 December 1992 – 17 November 1993	
—	Nahuce M. Abdullarim	4 July 1992	NRC	Bungudu	5 December 1992 – 17 November 1993	
—	Umaru Yakubu Maru	4 July 1992	NRC	Anka	5 December 1992 – 17 November 1993	
—	Usman Abdullahi Illela	4 July 1992	NRC	Illela	5 December 1992 – 17 November 1993	
—	Abdullahi Waziri Tambuwal	4 July 1992	NRC	Tambuwal	5 December 1992 – 17 November 1993	
—	Mwazu Ahmed	4 July 1992	NRC	Bakura	5 December 1992 – 17 November 1993	
—	Shehu Labaran	4 July 1992	NRC	Gwadabawa	5 December 1992 – 17 November 1993	
—	Umaru Sa'idu Gada	4 July 1992	NRC	Gada	5 December 1992 – 17 November 1993	
—	Atiku Liman Gande	4 July 1992	NRC	Silame	5 December 1992 – 17 November 1993	
—	Bello Mode	4 July 1992	NRC	Kware	5 December 1992 – 17 November 1993	
—	Ikra Aliyu	4 July 1992	NRC	Tsafe	5 December 1992 – 17 November 1993	
—	Aliyu Shehu Achida	4 July 1992	NRC	Wurno/Achida	5 December 1992 – 17 November 1993	
—	Muhammed A. Abubakar Mafara	4 July 1992	NRC	Talata Mafara	5 December 1992 – 17 November 1993	
—	Garba Mode Gidan Madi	4 July 1992	NRC	Tangaza	5 December 1992 – 17 November 1993	
—	Abubakar Hagiru Dange	4 July 1992	NRC	Dangeshuni	5 December 1992 – 17 November 1993	
—	Suleman Adamu	4 July 1992	NRC	Gummi	5 December 1992 – 17 November 1993	
—	Musa Usman	4 July 1992	NRC	Goronyo	5 December 1992 – 17 November 1993	
—	Yusuf Muazu Darhela	4 July 1992	NRC	—	5 December 1992 – 17 November 1993	
—	A. Bello Tudu Isa	4 July 1992	NRC	Isa	5 December 1992 – 17 November 1993	
—	Aliyu Mohammed	4 July 1992	NRC	Rabah	5 December 1992 – 17 November 1993	
Taraba	Philip Kundila	4 July 1992	SDP	Lau	5 December 1992 – 17 November 1993	
—	Baku S. Tsokwa	4 July 1992	SDP	Wukari	5 December 1992 – 17 November 1993	
—	Hamza Bappa Mohammed Ribadu	4 July 1992	NRC	Jalingo	5 December 1992 – 17 November 1993	
—	Haruna Adamu Suleman	4 July 1992	SDP	Ibi	5 December 1992 – 17 November 1993	
—	Samuel D. Alhamdu	4 July 1992	SDP	Zing	5 December 1992 – 17 November 1993	
—	Abbo Yakubu	4 July 1992	NRC	Gashaka	5 December 1992 – 17 November 1993	
—	Ishaya Alawaki Andrew	4 July 1992	SDP	Sardauna	5 December 1992 – 17 November 1993	
—	Yakubu Kashibu	4 July 1992	NRC	Takum	5 December 1992 – 17 November 1993	
—	Ahmed Abubakar Ubale Abdullahi	4 July 1992	SDP	Bali	5 December 1992 – 17 November 1993	
—	David Abra Kwati	4 July 1992	SDP	Yorro	5 December 1992 – 17 November 1993	
—	Manwe Jerimon Samuel	4 July 1992	SDP	Karim Lamido	5 December 1992 – 17 November 1993	
—	Reuben Yahaya Garpiya	4 July 1992	SDP	Donga	5 December 1992 – 17 November 1993	
Yobe	Mustapha Mallam Wa'a Kayeri	4 July 1992	SDP	Fune	5 December 1992 – 17 November 1993	
—	Tijani Zanna Zakariya	4 July 1992	SDP	Yusufari	5 December 1992 – 17 November 1993	
—	Alhassan Adamu Tikau	4 July 1992	NRC	Nangere	5 December 1992 – 17 November 1993	
—	Bashir Sheriff Ahmed	4 July 1992	SDP	Machina	5 December 1992 – 17 November 1993	
—	Afuno Bulama Masaba	4 July 1992	SDP	Bursari	5 December 1992 – 17 November 1993	
—	Sanda Yelwa	4 July 1992	SDP	Fika	5 December 1992 – 17 November 1993	
—	Umaru Audu	4 July 1992	SDP	Geidam	5 December 1992 – 17 November 1993	
—	Wakil Maidala Mularafa	4 July 1992	SDP	Gujba	5 December 1992 – 17 November 1993	
—	Sani Dahir El-Katuzu	4 July 1992	SDP	Base	5 December 1992 – 17 November 1993	
—	Ahmed Alhaji Musa	4 July 1992	SDP	Yunusari	5 December 1992 – 17 November 1993	
—	Madu Kolo Yawudima	4 July 1992	SDP	Damaturu	5 December 1992 – 17 November 1993	
—	Mohammed Musa Nguru	4 July 1992	SDP	Nguru	5 December 1992 – 17 November 1993	
—	Waya Dagari Lamarbago	4 July 1992	SDP	Jakusko	5 December 1992 – 17 November 1993	

The list, consistent with the 1989 Constitution, is based on the then-existing 30 states, as was the case under the administration of General Ibrahim Badamasi Babangida. The military regime of General Sani Abacha would later create six additional states: Bayelsa, Ebonyi, Ekiti, Gombe, Nassarawa, and Zamfara, bringing the total to 36 states.

As a result, the 1989 Constitution differs from the 1999 Constitution of the Fourth Nigerian Republic, primarily due to the later creation of these six states. While the provision of three senators per state was retained in both constitutions, the configuration of House of Representatives constituencies was expanded. Most constituencies were designed to cover at least two Local Government Areas, with only a few exceptions.

Consequently, the total number of senators increased to 108 (three per state) plus one for the Federal Capital Territory (FCT), making 109 in total. The number of House of Representatives members was later streamlined to 360.

== Annulment and dissolution ==
On 23 June 1993, General Ibrahim Badamasi Babangida (IBB) annulled the results of the presidential election. The decision triggered widespread unrest and political uncertainty across the country. According to The New York Times, "Many Yoruba have long resented the domination of Nigeria's political life by the mostly northern Hausa-Fulani ethnic group, and were ecstatic when one of their own, Mr. Abiola, appeared to have won the recent balloting."

In response to the annulment, the United Kingdom imposed sanctions, including the freezing of aid and withdrawal of military assistance. Under increasing domestic and international pressure, IBB resigned from office on 23 August 1993. He handed over power to Chief Ernest Shonekan, a Yoruba businessman and the head of the transitional council, who became the head of the Interim National Government.

However, Shonekan's administration struggled to assert authority and was unable to contain the rising political and economic instability that followed Babangida's exit. On 17 November 1993, his government was peacefully overthrown by the then Minister of Defence, General Sani Abacha, who assumed full control as head of state.

On 11 June 1994, the presumed winner of the annulled 1993 election, Chief Moshood Kashimawo Olawale (MKO) Abiola, declared himself President of Nigeria. He subsequently went into hiding, but was later arrested by the Abacha regime on charges of treason. Abiola remained in detention until his death in 1998, under circumstances that remain controversial.

== Legacy of 12 June 1993 ==
Following the protests and unrest that followed the annulment of the 12 June 1993 presidential election, the detention of Chief Moshood Kashimawo Olawale (MKO) Abiola, and his eventual death in 1998 (the same year General Sani Abacha died), the Nigerian political landscape was fundamentally altered.

After Abacha's sudden death, General Abdulsalami Abubakar from Niger State in North-Central Nigeria, assumed leadership. He promptly announced that the military would hand over power to a democratically elected civilian government on 29 May 1999. True to his word, General Abubakar oversaw a rapid transition to democracy. Two major political parties emerged during this process: the People's Democratic Party (PDP) and the All People's Party (APP).

Presidential elections were held in February 1999, with Olusegun Obasanjo of the PDP defeating Olu Falae of the APP with 63% of the vote. On 29 May 1999, Obasanjo, a former military Head of State and President-elect, was sworn into office, officially marking the beginning of the Fourth Nigerian Republic.

Former President Babangida (IBB), however, remained widely unpopular after leaving office, even in his home region in northern Nigeria. Despite efforts to stage a political comeback, he failed to gain widespread support.

General Abdulsalami Abubakar, on the other hand, has since played a central role as a respected mediator and elder statesman, often serving as a neutral figure in Nigeria's political disputes.

In June 2018, President Muhammadu Buhari officially moved Democracy Day from 29 May to 12 June, in recognition of the injustice suffered by MKO Abiola, acknowledging his role as a symbol of democratic struggle and martyrdom. Additionally, the National Stadium in Abuja was renamed the MKO Abiola Stadium in his honour.

On 29 May 2023, nearly three decades after the 12 June election, Bola Ahmed Tinubu, a long-time political protégé of Abiola, was sworn in as the 16th President of the Federal Republic of Nigeria after a closely contested general election. Tinubu, who had served as a Senator during the aborted Third Republic (1992–1993) and later as a two-term Governor of Lagos State (1999–2007), is widely regarded as a Yoruba political figure of significant influence, second only to Chief Obafemi Awolowo in South-West Nigerian politics.

== See also ==
- First Nigerian Republic (1963–1966)
- Second Nigerian Republic (1979–1983)
- Fourth Nigerian Republic (1999–present)
