= Bright Nwanne =

Nigerian politician

Former Senator of the Federal Republic of Nigeria for Imo East Senatorial/Owerri Zone (Third Republic)

Sen. Bright Nwanne
- In office 1992-1993 Third Republic

Personal details
- Born: 31 December 1956 (age 69) Ezinihitte Mbaise, Imo State
- Party: National Republican Convention (NRC)
- Education: University of Texas Arlington, United States
- Alma mater: St. Michael's Primary School, Aba; Methodist College, Uzuakoli.
- Occupation: Politician, Businessman

Bright Nwanne (born 31 December 1956) is a Nigerian politician, philanthropist, and former senator representing Imo East Senatorial Zone of Imo State in 1992. In 2015 he declared his interest in the gubernatorial seat in Imo State.

== Background and education ==
He was born in Ezinihitte Mbaise in Imo state. He went through his elementary studies at St. Michael's Primary School Aba, before moving to Methodist College, Uzuakoli where he graduated in 1975. He later got his first degree in Marketing at the University of Texas at Arlington, United States.

== Political career ==
He was a Nigerian senator of the Third Republic elected under the National Republican Convention (NRC) 1992 and was also a member of the Constituent Assembly that drafted the Nigerian Constitution that birthed the 3rd republic constitution and government in Nigeria in 1992. In 1993, following the military take-over of government, his tenure as a senator was short-lived by the political incursion of the military. He contested in the 2015 gubernatorial election in Imo State.
