= Abubakar Sadiq Mohammed =

Nigerian politician

Federal Minister of Tourism, Culture and National Orientation
- In office 6 April 2010- – 3 March 2011
- Preceded by: Jibrin Bello Gada

Personal details
- Born: 14 October 1961 (age 64) Nafada, Gombe State, Nigeria

Alhaji Abubakar Sadiq Mohammed (born 14 October 1961) is a Nigerian politician and officeholder. In 2008, he became chief of staff to the deputy speaker of the House of Representatives, Bayero Nafada. He was appointed minister of tourism, culture and national orientation on 6 April 2010, when acting president Goodluck Jonathan announced his new cabinet.

== Early life and education ==
Abubakar Sadiq Mohammed was born on 14 October 1961 in Nafada, Gombe State, Nigeria. He obtained a BSc (physics) in 1985 from University of Maiduguri and an MSc (physics) from the University of Ibadan. He was a lecturer at the Federal University of Technology Yola (1986–1996). He was managing director or CEO of several companies between 1996 and 2002. He worked at the National Teachers Institute, Kaduna (2002–2008).

== Political career ==
In 2008, Mohammed was appointed Chief of Staff to the Deputy Speaker of the House of Representatives of Nigeria, Bayero Nafada. On 6 April 2010, Acting President Goodluck Jonathan appointed him as the Minister of Tourism, Culture and National Orientation. He served in that role until 3 March 2011.
