= Chukwuemeka Ngozichineke Wogu =

Nigerian politician

Minister of Labour & Productivity
- In office 6 April 2010 – 2015
- Preceded by: Ibrahim Kazaure
- Succeeded by: Dr. Chris Ngige as Minister of Labour and Employment

Personal details
- Born: 29 January 1965 (age 61) Umuahia, Abia State, Nigeria
- Party: People's Democratic Party

Nwadiala Chukwuemeka Ngozichineke Wogu // (Emeka Ngozi Wogu) (born January 29, 1965) was appointed Nigerian Federal Minister of Labour & Productivity on 6 April 2010, when acting president Goodluck Jonathan announced his new cabinet.

== Early life and education ==
Wogu was born on 29 January 1965 in Umuahia, Abia State and completed his secondary education at Ngwa High School, Aba (1978–1980). He attended Imo State University (1982–1986) obtaining an LLB, and the Nigerian Law School (1986–1987) where he obtained a BL. In 1997, he established a private law practice, Emeka Wogu & Co. He earned his master's degree in public administration at the University of Calabar (2001–2002). He holds several traditional titles including Omezuru of Ohazie, Kpakpandu of Aba, Nwadiala of Aba and Amulutto of Oshogbo.

== Political career ==
Wogu was vice-chairman of the Aba South LGA in Abia State (1991–1993), becoming chairman of the LGA in 1993. He was elected to the Federal House of Representatives in 1998. In 1999, he was briefly the political adviser to Orji Uzor Kalu, governor of Abia State. He represented Abia State for two terms as commissioner at the Revenue Mobilisation Allocation and Fiscal Commission.

Immediately after being appointed Minister of Labour on 6 April 2010, Wogu had to deal with a strike by federal civil servants across the country that was planned to start on 8 April 2010. After meeting with the Joint Public Service Negotiating Council, which represents the eight unions involved, they agreed to hold off until the end of April 2010 while their concerns were being addresses.
