= Etang Edet Umoyo =

Nigerian politician (1949–2021)

Senator
- Constituency: Akwa Ibom South Senatorial District

Personal details
- Born: April 21, 1949
- Died: February 2021 (age 71)
- Occupation: Politician

Etang Edet Umoyo (April 21, 1949 – February 2021, 2021) was a Nigerian politician who served as a senator representing the Akwa Ibom South Senatorial District during the Third Republic of Nigeria. He died in February 2021 at the age of 71.
