= Hassan Muhammed Lawal =

Nigerian politician

Minister of Labour and Health
- In office 2004 – 17 December 2008
- Succeeded by: Adetokunbo Kayode

Minister of Works and Housing and Urban Development
- In office 17 December 2008 – 17 March 2010
- Succeeded by: Mohammed Sanusi Daggash

Personal details
- Born: 12 October 1954 Keffi, Nasarawa State, Nigeria
- Died: 24 March 2018 (aged 63)
- Party: APC

Hassan Lawal Nelly CON (12 October 1954 – 24 March 2018) was a Nigerian politician who served as a Minister for 7 years under President Olusegun Obasanjo.

== Background ==
Hassan was born in Keffi, Nasarawa State. He attended Ahmadu Bello University, Zaria where he obtained a Bachelor of Law Degree (LLB) in 1978 and was called to the Nigerian Bar in 1979. He later obtained an LLM and PhD in law from University of Warwick, England. He was appointed Sub-Dean of the faculty of Law of the University of Jos and head of the Department of Private Law (1987 - 1990).

Leaving academia, Lawal became the Company Secretary and Legal Adviser of the NNPC Refinery Company in Port-Harcourt (1990–1995). From 1995 to 1997 he was the Special Assistant to the Minister of Petroleum Resources. He was appointed General Manager Services of the NNPC Joint Venture, NAPIMS in 1997.

== Political career ==
In 1998, Lawal retired from NNPC and entered politics in 1999. In 2001, he was appointed Chairman of the Governing Board of the Nigerian Shippers Council, a parastatal of the Federal Ministry of Transport.

President Olusegun Obasanjo appointed him Federal Minister of Labour and Productivity in 2004. He was retained in this position in July 2007 by President Umaru Yar'Adua. In a cabinet reshuffle, he was appointed Minister of Works and Housing on 17 December 2008. He left office in March 2010, when Acting President Goodluck Jonathan dissolved his cabinet. He died after a brief illness and left behind five male children.
