= Emmanuel Chuka Osammor =

Professor Emmanuel Chuka Osammor (September 10, 1938 – 2007) was a Nigerian academic and politician who served as the minister of Police Affairs and later Employment, Labour and Productivity in the administration of President Shehu Shagari. He was also Attorney General for a short time in Nigeria. At the time of his death, Prof. Emmanuel Osammor was the Pro Chancellor of Bauchi University, Nigeria, a government advisor, and elder in the Peoples Democratic Party of Nigeria.

== Life ==
An indigene of Ogwashi-Uku, Osammor was born in Ilorin, Kwara State. He received primary education from Idah primary Catholic School and later attended St Patrick's College, Asaba, graduating in 1957. In 1964, he completed law studies at the University of Birmingham and was in private practice in 1966 before he joined the faculty of the Nigerian Law School in 1968.

== Political career ==
During the administration of Shehu Shagari, he served as the minister of police affairs overseeing the police's first sports festival, and later minister of employment and labour. After the end of the republic in 1984, he was exiled abroad and went into private practice.

He returned to Nigeria from exile during the Abacha regime. During the nation's fourth republic; Osammor was a founding member of the Peoples Democratic Party. He served on the party's executive committee and was a member of the party's reconciliation committee, chairing the committee's North Central Region. He died in December 2007 while visiting jailed former Delta State governor, James Ibori.

== Leadership ==
Before his death, the professor of law was leader of one of the several associations that metamorphosed into the ruling Peoples Democratic Party (PDP).

The late Osammor was also among the few politicians who worked tirelessly to ensure victory for Ibori and the PDP in Delta State, both in 1999 and 2003.

The late professor was a close associate of former minister of transport Umaru Dikko, Alhaji Ishaku Ibrahim and many other political big-wigs in the country. He was both a scholar and advocate of true federalism, not only in Delta, but Nigeria at large.

Retrieved from "http://nigerianwiki.com/wiki/Emmanuel_Osammor "

== Sources ==
- http://nigerianwiki.com/Emmanuel_Osammor
- http://ofilis1234.wordpress.com/2007/12/22/osamor-ex-minister-of-police-dies-after-visiting-ibori/
- http://duckduckgo.com/Emmanuel_Chuka_Osammor
- http://www.peopledemocraticparty.org/pressreleasenewboardoftrustee.html
- http://www.motherlandnigeria.com/old_transition.html
- http://ahooldus.ee/index.php?option=com_awiki&view=mediawiki&article=Emmanuel_Chuka_Osammor&Itemid=53
- http://emm.newsexplorer.eu/NewsExplorer/clusteredition/en/20071223,ngrguardiannews-77e79361206be4af4e52b6d6f6df3818.html
- http://www.mynaijanews.com/content/view/430/138/
- http://allafrica.com/stories/200712240616.html
- https://web.archive.org/web/20070804195758/http://www.sunnewsonline.com/webpages/politics/2006/june/10/politics-10-06-2006-001.htm
- http://www.pointblanknews.com/authbioofabiola9.html
- https://web.archive.org/web/20110725224920/http://deltastategovernor.org/news_fetcher.php?fid=112
- https://web.archive.org/web/20071224084021/http://www.thisdayonline.com/nview.php?id=98719
- http://odili.net/news/source/2007/dec/23/208.html
