= Bello Jibrin Gada =

Nigerian politician

Senator for Sokoto East
- In office May 1999 – May 2003
- Succeeded by: Sule Yari Gandi

Federal Minister of Culture & Tourism
- In office 17 December 2008 – 17 March 2010
- Preceded by: Adetokunbo Kayode
- Succeeded by: Abubakar Sadiq A. Mohammed

Personal details
- Born: 1954 (age 71–72) Sokoto State, Nigeria

Bello Jibrin Gada is a Nigerian politician who was Senator for Sokoto East from May 1999 to May 2003. He was appointed Minister of Culture & Tourism on 17 December 2008 after a cabinet reshuffle by President Umaru Yar'Adua. He left office in March 2010 when Acting President Goodluck Jonathan dissolved his cabinet.

Gada was born in 1954. He attended Bayero University (Kano) and Ahmadu Bello University (Zaria).He was elected Senator for Sokoto East on the All Nigeria People's Party (ANPP) platform, holding office from May 1999 to May 2003. He served as the Minority Whip during his term in office. Later, he defected to the ruling People's Democratic Party (PDP), where he became chairman of the Sokoto State People's Democratic Party.

A few weeks after being appointed Minister of Culture and Tourism, in January 2009 Gada gave his support to the Nigerian Tourism Development Corporation (NTDC), which was concerned about the rapidly growing number of tourism operators that were not accredited by the NTDC.

Speaking at the National Festival of Arts and Culture (NAFEST) held in Minna, Niger State in December 2009, Gada said the festival was much more than a dancing jamboree, but served as a vital tool for fostering unity in the country, showcased the country's diverse culture and promoted tourism.

In a February 2010 press briefing, Gada listed the achievements of his ministry in the past year which included establishing six cultural industry centres, creating the Institute for African Culture and International Understanding, Abeokuta and establishing a committee on National Archives and National Museums. He outlined plans for the future such as increased public/private partnership and rehabilitation and reconstruction of abandoned and dilapidated museums and archives projects. He did not discuss the National Tourism Master-plan.In March 2010 Gada inaugurated various committees of the Federation of Tourism Associations of Nigeria to help put the country at par with other African tourist nations.
