= Abdallah Wali =

Nigerian politician

Abdallah Muhammad Wali

Senator for Sokoto South
- In office May 1999 – May 2003
- Succeeded by: Umaru Dahiru

Minister for National Planning Commission
- In office January 2007 – June 2007

Personal details
- Born: Tambuwal LGA, Sokoto State, Nigeria
- Party: Peoples Democratic Party (PDP)
- Education: Ahmadu Bello University

Abdallah Muhammad Wali was elected senator for the Sokoto South constituency of Sokoto State, Nigeria at the start of the Fourth Nigerian Republic, running on the Peoples Democratic Party (PDP) platform. He took office on 29 May 1999.

== Biography ==
Wali was born in Tambuwal Local Government Area, Sokoto State.

He obtained a B.Sc. in management from Usman Danfodiyo University, Sokoto and an MBA from Ahmadu Bello University, Zaira.

After taking his seat in the Senate in June 1999, he was appointed to committees on Selection, Senate Services, Public Accounts, Defense and Federal Character.

He was senate Leader from June 1999 to November 1999, and chair of the Senate Committee on Economic Affairs from 2000 to 2003.

He was the PDP candidate for governor of Sokoto State in 2003.

In January 2007 Wali was appointed Minister for the National Planning Commission, and deputy chairman of the commission, by President Olusegun Obasanjo.

Later he was appointed ambassador to the Kingdom of Morocco.
