= National Republican Convention =

Defunct Nigerian political party

The National Republican Convention was a Nigerian political party established by the government of General Ibrahim Babangida and ultimately disbanded by the military regime of General Sani Abacha in 1993.

== Alignment ==
The party was organized to cater to the conservative leanings of some Nigerians, it flourished in the core northern states and Eastern states of Abia and Enugu. However, many felt there was little difference between the party and its competitor, the Social Democratic Party, another government created party. Both parties were under the supervision of the military government and most of its presidential candidates favored a continuation of the Structural Adjustment Programme of the Babangida administration.

== History ==
The party was largely an amalgamation of three major organizations, the Liberal Convention, the Nigeria National Congress and the Federalists. In its first presidential primary, the race was dominated by a few prominent Hausa-Fulani leaders. Adamu Ciroma, a former minister and former governor of the central bank was its leading candidate; he collected about 270,000 votes. Umaru Shinkafi, came in second with about 250,000 votes.

The party was under the leadership of Tom Ikimi, an architect from Edo State.
