= National Senior Citizens Act, 2018 =

Nigerian law

National Assembly of the Federal Republic of Nigeria
- Territorial extent: Nigeria
- Enacted by: National Assembly of the Federal Republic of Nigeria
- Signed: 28 January 2018

The National Senior Citizens Act, 2018 is an act which was passed by the Federal Government of Nigeria to cater for the needs of the senior citizens. The act was signed into law by President Muhammadu Buhari and led to the establishment of the National Senior Citizens Centre in Nigeria to cater for the needs of the senior citizens. The National Senior Citizens Centre is domiciled with the Federal Ministry of Humanitarian Affairs, Disaster Management and Social Development.

The centre held its maiden dialogue chaired by the Minister for Humanitarian Affairs, Disaster Management and Social Development, Sadiya Umar Farouq on Monday, August 2 in Abuja to discuss issues bothering on senior citizens and how to leverage on their experience and knowledge for nation building.

== Core Objective ==
The act establishes the National Senior Citizens Centre in the country to cater for its senior/older citizens (citizens over 70 years).

== Content ==
The National Senior Citizens Act, 2018 is a 12 page document published by the Federal Government of Nigeria. The act is divided into 5 parts (Part I - V). They include;

Part I- Defines the policy, establishment and composition of the National Senior Citizens Centre.

Part II- Specifies the functions of the National Centre.

Part III- Discusses the composition and powers of the staff of the National Centre.

Part IV- Lists the financial provisions of the Centre.

Part V- Indicates the supplemental powers of the Centre.

== Board Members ==
The Board was constituted in 2018 by President Muhammadu Buhari. The board members include;

- Air Vice Marshall M. A. Muhammad (Rtd) (Chairman)
- Mansur Kuliya (Rep. Federal Ministry of Humanitarian Affairs, Disaster Management and Social Development)
- Chris Isokpunwu (Rep. Federal Ministry of Health)
- Umar Utono (Rep. Federal Ministry of Works and Housing)
- John Magbadelo (Rep. Federal Ministry of Labour and Productivity)
- Bulus Kimde (Rep. Federal Ministry of Women Affairs)
- Sani Mustapha (Rep. Pension Transitional Arrangement Directorate (PTAD))
- Usman Ahmed (Rep. Geriatric Association of Nigeria)
- Arc. Victoria Onu (Rep. Coalition of Societies for the Rights of Older Persons (CORSOPIN))
- Dorothy Nwodo (Stakeholder)
- Mohammed Namadi (Stakeholder)
- Emem Omokaro (Director General)
