= Ismail Ahmed =

Ismail Ahmed, Ismaeel Ahmed or Esmaeel Ahmad may refer to:

- Isma'il ibn Ahmad (died 907), Samanid emir of Transoxiana and Khorasan
- Ismail Ahmed Cachalia (1908–2003), South African political activist
- Ismail Ahmed Rajab Al Hadidi (born 1955), Iraqi politician
- Ismail Ahmad (born 1956), Malaysian politician
- Ismail Ould Cheikh Ahmed (born 1960), Mauritanian diplomat
- Ismail Ahmad (basketball) (born 1976), Egyptian-Lebanese basketball player
- Ismail Ahmed (footballer, born 1983) (born 1983), Emarati footballer
- Ismail Ahmed Ismail (born 1984), Sudanese runner
- Ismail Ahmed Kadar Hassan (born 1987), Djiboutian footballer
- Ismail Ahmed (businessman), founder of WorldRemit
- Ismaeel Buba Ahmed, Nigerian politician, lawyer, and youth leader

== See also ==
- Ismail Ahmedani (1930–2007), Saraiki writer
- Ahmed Ismail (disambiguation)
