= Ahmed Ismail =

Ahmed Ismail or Ahmad Ismail, Ahmed Esmaeel, Ahmad Esmaeel is an Arabic name, it may refer to a person with Ahmed given name and had a father called Ismail, or part of person's Patronymic name which refer him as the son of Ahmed and grandson of Ismail or even grandson of Ahmed and great-grandson of Ismail

- Ahmed Ismail El Shamy (born 1975), Egyptian boxer
- Ahmad Isma'il 'Uthman Saleh (died 2000), Egyptian Islamic Jihad
- Ahmad Ismail Ali (1917–1974). Egyptian soldier, Commander-in-Chief and minister of war during the October War of 1973
- Ahmad Ismail (Malaysian politician) (born 1955)
- Ahmed Yassin (Sheikh Ahmed Ismail Hassan Yassin, 1937–2004), Palestinian imam and politician
- Ahmed Ismail Samatar (born before 1978), Somali writer and academic
- Ahmed Mohamed Ismail (born 1964), Somali Olympic marathon runner
- Ismail Ahmed Ismail (born 1984), Sudanese runner
- Sultan Ahmed Ismail (born 1951), Indian soil biologist and ecologist
- Ahmad Samani (Ahmad ibn Ismail, died 914), amir of the Samanids

== See also ==
- Ismail Ahmed (disambiguation)
