= Disability in Nigeria =

Estimates vary for the number of people with disabilities in Nigeria, ranging from under 3 million people to over 25 million. Nigerian law prohibits discrimination against people with disabilities. Some discrimination occurs due to prevalent superstitions.

== Extent ==
The World report on disability, published in 2011, said about 25 million Nigerians had at least one disability, while 3.6 million of these had very significant difficulties in functioning. The 2006 Nigerian census reported 3,253,169 people with disabilities, or 2.32% of the total population of 140,431,790 in that year. However, the Centre for Citizens with Disabilities, a Nigerian NGO, claims the census did not capture the full extent of disability in Nigeria, and has called on Nigeria's National Population Commission to cooperate with the Ministry of Women Affairs and Social Development for the 2016 census in order to measure disability more accurately. As at 2020, there are reportedly over 27 million Nigerians living with some form of disability.

== Types ==
The five most common types of disabilities in Nigeria are, in descending order, visual impairment, hearing impairment, physical impairment, intellectual impairment, and communication impairment.

== Societal and governmental approach ==
Nigeria ratified the United Nations Convention on the Rights of Persons with Disabilities on 30 March 2007 and its Optional Protocol on 24 September 2010. The Ministry of Women Affairs and Social Development is charged with submitting reports on progress, but has yet to do so as of 2013.

A 2008 study by the United Kingdom Department for International Development found that the public, the Ministry of Women Affairs and Social Development, and disabled people's organizations (DPOs) in Nigeria understood disability within a discourse of welfare and charity. This is as opposed to emphasis on social adaptation, inclusion, and empowerment as advocated by the social model of disability that is generally favored in the field of disability studies. It also found that two national umbrella DPOs, the Joint National Association of Persons with Disabilities (JONAWPD) and the Association for the Comprehensive Empowerment of Nigerians with Disabilities (ASCEND), often strongly disagreed while both presuming to speak on behalf of all Nigerians with disabilities, impeding their ability to lobby the government.

Nine years after Nigeria ratified the United Nations Convention on the Rights of Persons with Disabilities, the President General Muhammadu Buhari into law the Discrimination Against Persons with Disabilities (Prohibition) Act 2018. The Law enshrined recommendations of Convention on the Rights of Persons with Disabilities while awarding punitive damages to victims of discriminations living with disabilities.

The law prohibits discrimination against people living with disabilities PLWD and sanctions those who contravene with fines. A five-year transitional period was stipulated for the modification of amenities particularly in public buildings and fixing assistive tools in vehicles to make them accessible and usable for people with disabilities.

== National Commission for Persons with Disabilities ==
In line with the Prohibition Act of 2018 bill, President Muhammadu Buhari approved the establishment of National Commission for Persons with Disabilities and approved the appointment of James Lalu as its Executive Secretary. NCPWD is to prevent discrimination against persons with disabilities, and to make every one of them have equal rights and opportunities like their counterparts with no disabilities.
