= N-Power =

Nigerian youth graduate and non-graduate scheme

- Formation: 8 June 2016
- Founder: Muhammadu Buhari
- Type: National Social Investment Program
- Purpose: To address the issue of youth unemployment and help increase social development
- Headquarters: Abuja, Nigeria
- Members: Unemployed Nigerians between the ages of 18 and 35
- Minister in-charge: Sadiya Umar Farouq
- Beneficiaries: 500,000
- Website: http://npower.gov.ng

N-Power is a scheme set up by the former President of Nigeria, Muhammadu Buhari since 8 June 2016, to address the issues of youth unemployment and help increase social development. The scheme was created as a component of National Social Investment Program, to provide a structure for large scale and relevant work skills acquisition and development and to ensure that each participant will learn and practice most of what is necessary to find or create work.

Applicants are selected and placed is several places known as primary place of assignment (PPA). These PPA can be found by checking the Npower Deployment Status. Applicants will then be paid specific stipends on monthly basis by the scheme.

== History ==
N-Power was created on 8 June 2016 to address the issues of youth unemployment and help increase social development. The scheme is created for unemployed graduates and non-graduates between the ages of 18 and 35. It is a paid programme of a two-year duration, aimed at engaging beneficiaries in their states of residence. On 13 July 2019, Nigerian federal government disclosed that they have spent a total of ₦279b since they started paying the scheme beneficiaries from December 2016 to June 2019. The scheme currently has six categories namely; N-Teach, N-Health, N-Agro, N-Build, N-Creative and N-Tech. N-Teach and N-Health are available to only graduates who must have completed the mandatory one year NYSC programme, while N-Agro, N-Build, N-Creative and N-Tech is available to graduates and non-graduates. In 2021, the Federal Government introduced another Npower category known as N-knowledge and, it is targeted at Nigerian youths. The aim is to help youths learn computer hardware skills that are profitable and employable. Npower has been able to successfully train 1,500 Youths and also gave them tools such as Laptops to each beneficiary.

=== Batch A ===
On 12 June 2016, online enrolment for N-Power Batch A beneficiaries commenced on the online registration portal. The portal for registration was supposed to close on 25 July 2016, but was extended till 31 August 2016, allowing a total of 350,000 Nigerians to apply. On 21 November 2016, 200,000 Nigerian youths out of the 350,000 that applied were selected based on their performances in an online assessment test. 150,000 beneficiaries were selected under N-Teach category, 30,000 under N-Agro and 20,000 under N-Health. On 1 December 2016, the Batch A beneficiaries started work in their various places of primary assignment. On 19 June 2020, the minister of humanitarian affairs, disaster management and social development, Sadiya Umar Farouq announced that the Batch A beneficiaries will be disengaged from the scheme on 30 June 2020. They were supposed to spend 24 months on the programme, but instead, they spent 43 months.

=== Batch B ===
On 13 June 2017, online enrolment for N-Power Batch B beneficiaries commenced and within 5 days, more than 750,000 applications were received on the online registration portal. The application portal closed on 27 July 2017 and received a total of 2,543,079 applications, 2,258,266 persons scaled through the BVN validation stage and were invited to proceed to an online assessment test. From 1 July 2017 to 31 August 2017, the online assessment test was conducted to select qualified applicants in four categories, N-Tax, N-Health, N-Agro and N-Teach. A total of 1,746,454 persons wrote the online test and 300,000 were selected based on their performances in the assessment test. They were physically verified from 4 December 2017 to 14 December 2017 in the 774 local government areas in Nigeria. On 1 August 2018, the Batch B beneficiaries started work in their various places of primary assignment. On 19 June 2020, the minister of humanitarian affairs, disaster management and social development, Sadiya Umar Farouq announced that the Batch B beneficiaries will be disengaged from the scheme on 31 July 2020.

After the successful training and disengagement of the batch A and B beneficiaries the Federal Government through the minister of Humanitarian affairs, disaster management and social development made the promise to establish an exit programme for the N-Power beneficiaries on entrepreneurship known as exit programme

=== Batch C ===
On 26 June 2020, online enrollment for N-Power Batch C beneficiaries commenced and within 48 hours, more than 1 million applications were received on the online registration portal. One week after the online registration portal opened, three million applications were received. The Batch C has a new twist as it will only run for 12 months with two streams recruiting 500,000 per annum. The first stream reported to their place of primary assignment on September 4, 2020.

== See also ==
- NITDA Digital State Initiative
