= Superstition in Nigeria =

Superstition in Nigeria plays a significant role in the Nigerian society.

Some aspects of superstition result in discrimination against vulnerable groups in Nigeria. Many people in Nigeria still believe in witchcraft, with many victims being children. Other negatively affected groups include people with disabilities and women.

Superstions in Nigeria can also affect aspects of Nigerian economy, such as farming (ex. duck raising).

== See also ==
- Anja Ringgren Lovén
- West African mythology
