= Ismaeel Buba Ahmed =

Nigerian politician and lawyer (born 1980)

Ismaeel Ahmed
- Born: Ismaeel Ahmed; 18 March 1980 (age 46); Kano
- Other name: Barr. Ismail
- Education: Webster University; University of Abuja
- Occupations: Lawyer, politician
- Organization: All Progressives Congress APC

Ismaeel Buba Ahmed (born 18 March 1980) is a Nigerian politician, lawyer, and youth leader who has served as a Senior Special Assistant on National Social Investment Program to Nigerian Former President Muhammadu Buhari from 2018 to 2022.

== Early life and education ==
Ismaeel Ahmed was born and raised in the ancient city of Kano, Nigeria. He attended Government Secondary School, Bwari, Abuja in 1998. He then proceeded to the University of Abuja where he graduated with a Bachelor of Laws degree in 2005. Ismaeel finished from the Nigerian Law School, Abuja in 2006 before proceeding to Webster University in St Louis, Missouri, United States, where he received a master's degree in international relations, communications and diplomacy in 2008.

== Politics ==
In 2011, Ismaeel Ahmed contested for, and won the primary election to represent Nassarawa Federal Constituency, Kano State, at the House of Representatives (Nigeria) under the Congress for Progressive Change (CPC). In 2012, he was selected as a member of the Renewal Committee for the Congress for Progressive Change (CPC). 2013 witnessed a merger of major opposition parties in Nigeria, including the CPC, ahead of the 2015 general elections. That merger led to the formation of the All Progressives Congress (APC). Ismaeel Ahmed was a member of the manifesto sub-committee that worked towards the merger. Following on the heels of the formation of the APC, Ismaeel founded the Youth Wing of the new party, known as the All Progressives Youth Forum (APYF). He occupied the position Chairman of the APYF from 2013 until March 2018 when he handed over to Ife Adebayo.

Towards the build up to the general elections in 2015, Ismaeel served as Secretary, Membership Registration Committee for Katsina State, APC; Member, State Congresses Committee Katsina State, APC; and Member, APC Presidential Primaries Convention, all in 2014. In 2015, he served on the following Directorates of the All Progressives Congress (APC) Presidential Campaign Council: Directorate of Contact and Mobilization; Directorate of Policy and Strategy; Directorate of Security and Intelligence; and Directorate of Youth Mobilization. He also served on the Sub-Committee on Venue and Entertainment, Presidential Inauguration Planning Committee, 2015.

In 2016, Ismaeel Ahmed was the chairman, Monitoring Committee, APC Gubernatorial Primaries, Ondo State; and chairman, APC Gubernatorial and Legislative Primaries. Nasarawa State in 2018. He served as deputy director, Directorate of Youth, APC Presidential Campaign Council in 2019. He is currently serving as member, National Caretaker/Extraordinary Convention Committee of the All Progressives Congress APC.

He was appointed as Senior Special Assistant to the President on National Social Investment Program in 2017. The appointment was renewed in 2019.

In June 2021, he organised the maiden edition of the APC Youth Summit which was aimed at deepening democratic process through youth inclusion. The event was declared open by Nigeria's Vice President Yemi Osinbajo and had other speakers such as Senate President Ahmed Lawan, Speaker, House of Representatives (Nigeria) Femi Gbajabiamila, Nigeria's Minister of Works Babatunde Raji Fashola, Akin Oyebode, Tonye Cole amongst others.

== Awards ==
- Most Influential People of African Descent (MIPAD), global 100 under 40 - 2019
- Nigerian Students Awards
- Social Protection Advocate Award (South Africa)
- Anti-Drug Abuse Ambassador Award
- Heroes of Democracy Awards
- The Iconics Africa Honorary Awards
