= Anja Ringgren Lovén =

Founder of the NGO Land of Hope

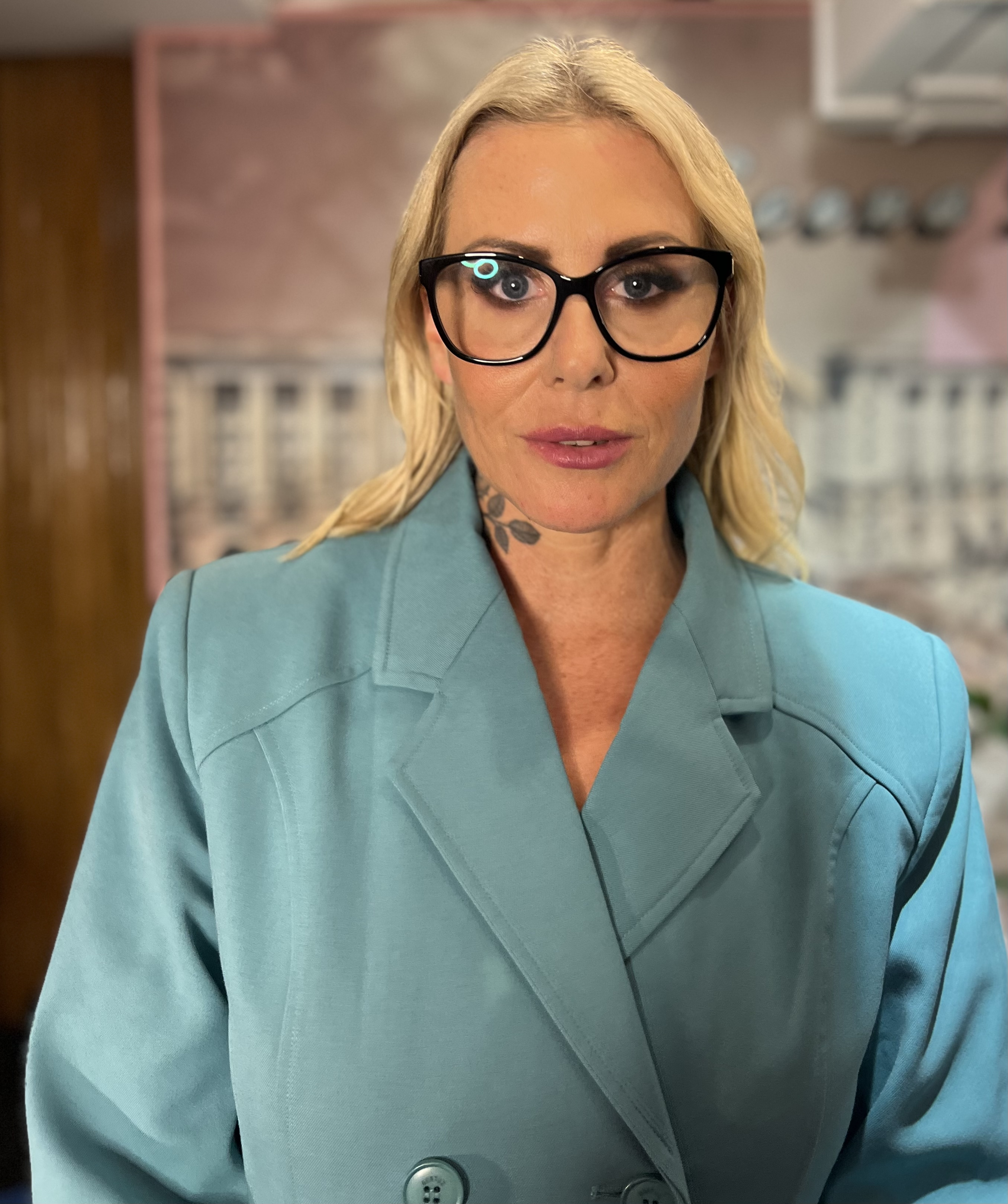
- Anja Ringgren Lovén in 2023
- Born: September 4, 1978 (age 48); Frederikshavn, Denmark
- Occupation: Charity worker
- Known for: Founding DINNødhjælp; Fighting witchcraft accusations in Nigeria

Anja Ringgren Lovén (born 4 September 1978) is a Danish humanitarian and founder of the charity organization Land Of Hope (formerly DINNødhjælp). Since 2012, the organization has been dedicated to protecting and rescuing children in Nigeria accused of witchcraft—a practice stemming from deep-rooted superstition that often leads to ostracism, abuse, or death. Lovén gained global recognition in 2016 when a photo of her rescuing a severely malnourished boy, later named "Hope," went viral, shedding light on her efforts to combat child abuse linked to witchcraft accusations.

== Career ==
Lovén graduated from Frederikshavn Gymnasium in 1998. Following high school, she traveled to the Middle East, including a stay in Israel at a kibbutz. In 2001, she trained as a stewardess with Maersk Air but left the position to care for her terminally ill mother, who died shortly thereafter. Subsequently, Lovén pursued a career in retail, eventually working as a store manager in Aarhus.

Her journey into humanitarian work began in 2009 with a three-month stint in Malawi as an observer for the Danish National Church Aid. Inspired by her experience, she initiated a fundraising project to renovate a school in Tanzania, where she traveled independently. In 2012, Lovén founded DINNødhjælp, initially while working as a salesperson in Aarhus. A year later, she sold all her possessions and dedicated herself fully to aiding so-called "witch children" in Nigeria.

In collaboration with Nigerian law student David Emmanuel Umem, Lovén co-founded the African Children's Aid, Education and Development Foundation (ACAEDF) in 2014 to establish infrastructure for vulnerable children. Together, they acquired land in Akwa Ibom, Nigeria, and, with the support of Engineers Without Borders, built the Land of Hope Children's Center. The center spans three acres and includes a children’s hospital, a business school, and facilities to house up to 100 children, offering a safe and nurturing environment while addressing superstition through education and advocacy.

Since 2014, Lovén has delivered lectures about her humanitarian efforts, emphasizing the personal sacrifices she made and the significance of her work at the Land of Hope Children’s Center. Her lectures focus on raising awareness about superstitions in Nigeria and inspiring others to pursue meaningful change. She is one of Denmark's most in-demand public speakers.

== Personal life ==
Lovén was born and raised in Frederikshavn, Denmark.

== Documentaries ==
Lovén's work has been featured in various documentaries, including:

- Helvedes Helte (DR2)
- En dansker redder verden – Anja Ringgren Lovén (DR)
- Anja og Heksebørnene (DR2)
- Anjas Afrika (DR)
- Hexenkinder in Nigeria: Diese Heldin rettet ihnen das Leben (2018, Germany)

In 2018, her meeting with the Dalai Lama was documented in Anja's Orphanage (DR2), highlighting his recognition of her efforts.

== Awards and recognition ==
- 2016: Named "The World's Most Inspiring Person" by OOOM Magazine.
- 2016: Awarded the Niels Ebbesen Medal.
- 2017: Paul Harris Fellowship recipient.
- 2017: Recipient of the Hope Award.
- Recognized by the Dalai Lama for her humanitarian contributions.

Additionally, Lovén has been nominated for Dane of the Year 2017 and the Nordjyske Initiative Award 2015.
