= NITDA Digital State Initiative =

Digital training scheme of Nigeria

NITDA Digital State Initiative is a Nigerian program to train Nigerians of the ages of around 16 to 40 years, it is set by the Ministry of Communication and Digital Economy (Nigeria) under its agency National Information Technology Development Agency (NITDA) to train the nation on Digital Literacy and Skills program, based on Digital Literacy and Skills fundamental of the National Digital Economy Policy and Strategy for a Digital Nigeria (NDEPS).

== History ==
The Digital States project, which is one of NDEPS implementation strategies, aims to provide Nigerian youths with the digital literacy skills they required to enhance youth move the country to digital economy.

The programme is allocated to train about 540 youths from each state of Nigeria, includes the Federal Capital Territory, Abuja, approximately about 20,000 Nigerians will benefit from the programme.

== Programs ==
The program is to focus on the following field of digital economy

- Digital Marketing: To enhance Nigerians on how to improve sales of digital entrepreneurs in their new or existing businesses they own.
- Productivity Tools: To increase productivity of students and employees at school and work.
- Content Creation: To guide Nigerians on creation of contents that will promote their online businesses especially on social media platforms.

The beneficiary states for the first phase are Gombe, Kano, Lagos and Rivers States.

== See also ==
- N-Power
