= Fort Bangsbo =

German-Danish coastal fortification near Frederikshavn, Denmark

A German bunker at Fort Bangsbo.

Fort Bangsbo, also known as Bangsbo Fort, is a German-Dutch fortification constructed near the town of Frederikshavn, Denmark. The fort was first constructed by the occupying German forces in 1940, and was expanded by the Danes after the war as a Cold War fort. While most of the fort was decommissioned in 1962, the Royal Danish Navy still uses some of the bunkers. The rest have been turned into a museum.

== Stützpunktgruppe Frederikshavn Süd ==
Fort Bangsbo, also known as Stützpunktgruppe Frederikshavn Süd, was first constructed in 1940, during the German occupation of Denmark. When German troops occupied Frederikshavn on April 9, 1940, they realized that this site would be advantageous for an artillery battery. A temporary battery of 88 mm anti-aircraft guns was located on the site of the current battery, but they were replaced by a more permanent battery of 88 mm guns in May 1940. Construction started in May 1940, and two pairs of two German 15 cm guns were reported operational by June 1940. These guns were later replaced by purpose-built Danish 12 cm naval guns. These were replaced by Danish 15 cm naval guns from the Danish ship HDMS Niels Juel, which still remain in their bunkers. Fort Bangsbo occupies an 82 m (269 ft) tall ridge overlooking Frederikshavn and can fire at any ship trying to enter Frederikshavn harbor. The hill is dotted with bunkers, both anti-infantry and naval artillery. The total composition of the defenses was 34 thick-walled concrete Regelbau bunkers, 17 thin-walled concrete VF type bunkers, and 30 other concrete structures of various purposes. Probably the most used of the 34 other structures was the either Würzburg radar bunker or the Naval command bunker, both were operated by the Kriegsmarine. Unlike many of the Atlantikwall fortifications which were operated by the German Army (Heer), Stützpunktgruppe Frederikshavn Süd was operated by the Kriegsmarine because it protected one of their main bases for transporting and escorting supplies to occupied Norway.

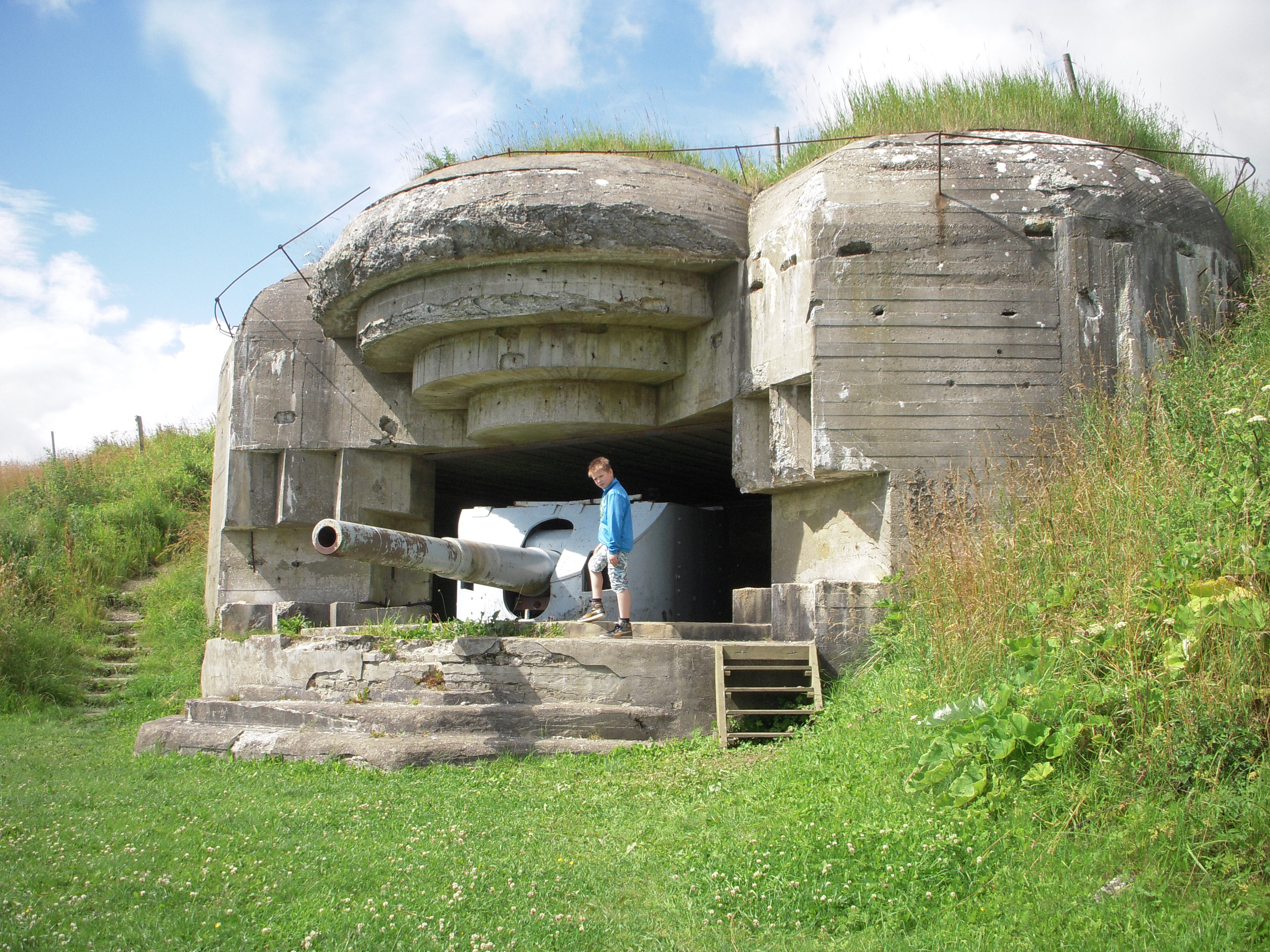
One of the 15 cm guns from Niels Juel

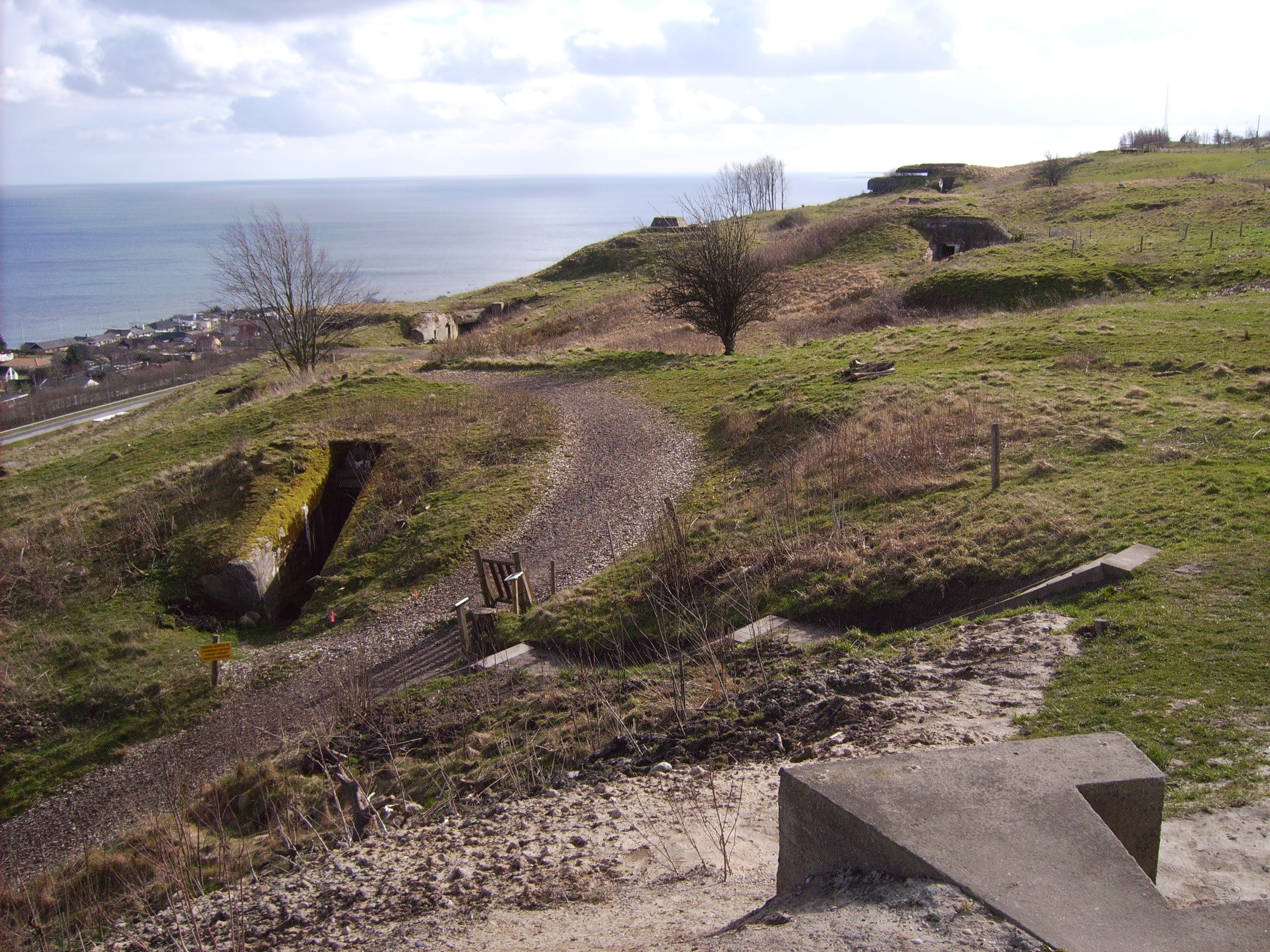
At least six bunkers can be seen in this photo, including the radar bunker far off in the center.

Several of the bunkers at Stützpunktgruppe Frederikshavn Süd were equipped with 20 mm and 37 mm anti-aircraft guns, while some open pads were equipped with the usual 88 mm anti-aircraft gun or the uncommon 105 mm AA gun. In addition to the large amounts of bunkers, there were also three rows of barbed wire that surrounded the whole area and numerous minefields.

== Fort Bangsbo ==
One of the German bunkers on display at the Bangsbo Fort Bunker Museum.

The Danish name for the fort is Bangsbo Fort, however the more proper name is Fort Bangsbo. The Danish Royal Navy took over the fortifications left by the Germans in September 1945. They continued to use many of the fortifications through the early 1960s, when the fort was decommissioned. The Danes modified several of the German 20 mm anti-aircraft bunkers to house 37 mm guns, these were some of the modifications done by the Danes after the war. They also replaced the radar with a newer and more accurate version in the 1950s but kept many of the bunkers the same. The Danes also added twin-barreled Bofors 40 mm anti-aircraft guns to augment the aging air defenses left by the Germans in 1945. Much of Fort Bangsbo was decommissioned in 1962, after 22 years of service in two armies. The main reason for decommissioning the fort was the outdated technology and the fact that it could not be modernized without immense costs. In 2002, the decommissioned parts of the fort became a museum dedicated to showing how German soldiers occupying the Atlantic Wall lived. A small part of the fort is still used by the Royal Dutch Navy as a radar base and radio station.
