= Krudttårnet =

Historical gunpowder magazine in Frederikshavn, Denmark

Coordinates: 57°26′23.4″N 10°32′27″E

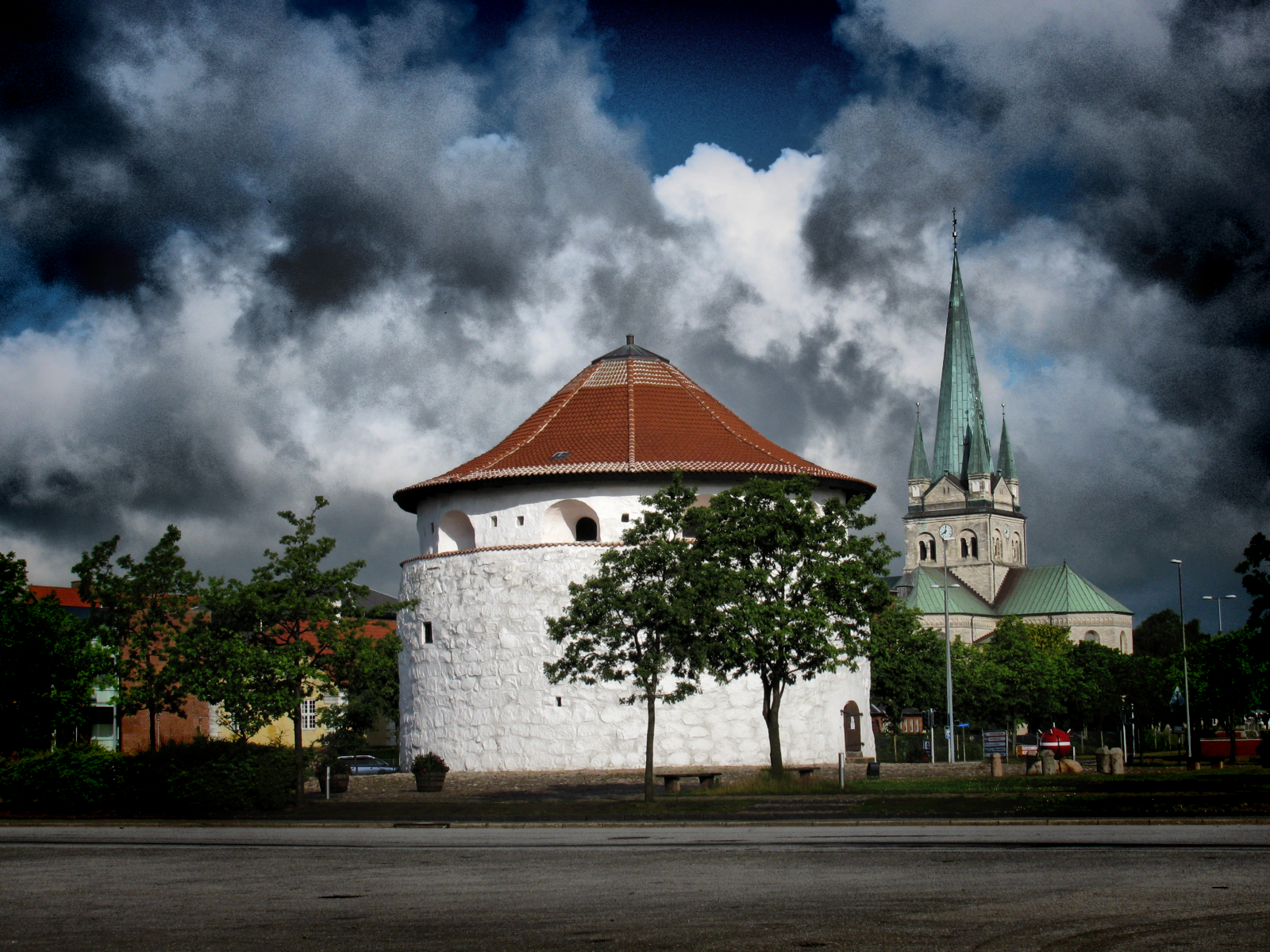
Krudttårnet

Krudttårnet (Danish for "gunpowder tower") is a former gunpowder magazine and fortification in Frederikshavn, Denmark.

== Background ==
The tower was built in 1687, as a central component of Frederikshavn's fortress. The fortress, originally called the Fladstrand fortress before the town was renamed in the early 19th century, was built to secure the northernmost useful anchorage on the eastern coast of Jutland. This anchorage was a strategically important site for ships sailing to Norway, and played a role in conflicts including the Great Northern War and the Gunboat War. The tower is now the only part of the citadel still standing, but is no longer in the original location: in 1974 it was moved by 270 meters to make room for an expansion of Frederikshavn's shipyard, a move that took 13 months to carry out. It reopened to the public in 1976, as part of Bangsbo Museum.
