= Betta Edu =

Nigerian politician (born 1986)

Minister of Humanitarian Affairs and Poverty Alleviation
- In office 21 August 2023 on suspension since 8 January 2024 – 23 October 2024
- Preceded by: Sadiya Umar Farouq

National Women Leader of the All Progressives Congress
- In office March 2022 – August 2023

Cross River State Commissioner for Health
- In office December 2019 – March 2022

Personal details
- Born: Betta Chimaobim Eke; 27 October 1986 (age 40) Lagos, Nigeria
- Party: All Progressives Congress (2021–present)
- Education: University of Calabar
- Occupation: Politician
- Website: www.bettaedu.ng

Betta Chimaobim Edu (born 27 October 1986) is a Nigerian medical doctor and politician. She served as national women leader of All Progressive Congress. She was Cross River State Commissioner for Health until her resignation in 2022. She was also National Chairman of the Nigeria Health Commissioners Forum.

== Early life and education ==
Edu was born on 27 October 1986 in Lagos, Nigeria. She completed her secondary education in 2001 at the Federal Government Girls College, Calabar and obtained her first degree in medicine and surgery from the University of Calabar in 2009. She has a Post Graduate Diploma in Public Health for Developing Countries from London School Hygiene & Tropical Medicine, a master's degree in Public Health in Developing Countries from London School of Hygiene & Tropical Medicine and Doctor of Public Health from Texila American University.

== Career ==
In 2015, Edu became the youngest person to be appointed Special Adviser to the Executive Governor of Cross River State Benedict Ayade on Community and Primary Healthcare.

In 2020, she became chairman of the Cross River State COVID-19 Taskforce. In August that year, she was appointed National Chairman of the Nigeria Health Commissioners Forum. Edu is a Fellow of the Royal School of Public Health and the African Institute of Public Health Professionals. Edu became the youngest national woman leader of the All Progressives Congress (APC) in March 2022.

In July 2023, the state women leaders of the All Progressives Congress (APC) from all 36 states of Nigeria including the Federal Capital Territory (FCT) passed a vote of confidence on Edu. They did this during their visit to President Bola Ahmed Tinubu at the Presidential Villa, Abuja.

Also in July 2023, the Federal Government of Nigeria through the Maryam Babangida National Center For Women Development, headed by DG Asabe Vilita Bashir, in collaboration with the Ministry of Women Affairs and Social Development awarded Edu the Award of Excellence in Leadership for gender inclusion and women empowerment. This is in recognition of her commitment to championing the empowerment of women, children, and other vulnerable groups in Nigeria. In July 2023, President Bola Ahmed Tinubu nominated Edu for a ministerial position as the Nigerian Senate unveiled 28 nominees for ministerial appointments, making her the first female minister from Cross River State and the youngest minister at the Federal Executive Council of Nigeria in the Fourth Nigerian republic.

In August 2023, Edu was sworn in as minister of humanitarian affairs and poverty alleviation and the All Progressives Congress replaced her as national women leader.

== Controversies ==
=== ₦585 million fraud ===
In 2020, Edu was accused of posting fake photos of ventilators. The Cross River State chapter of the Nigerian Medical Association passed a vote of no confidence on Edu over accusations of professional misconduct in the context of the COVID-19 pandemic. Edu claimed that the vote of no confidence was political. In 2022, during her campaign to become National Women Leader of the APC, Edu was accused of procedural misconduct.

On 8 January 2024, she was suspended from her position as the minister of humanitarian affairs and poverty alleviation by President Bola Ahmed Tinubu for allegedly diverting ₦585 million in ministry funds to a personal bank account. President Tinubu asked the Economic and Financial Crimes Commission (EFCC) for a thorough investigation.

The investigation that followed suggested a misappropriation of public funds on a much larger scale. In April 2024, the EFCC's chairman, Olanipekun Olukoyede, wrote, "As it is now, we are investigating over 50 bank accounts that we have traced money into." The approximate average amount in each of Edu's bank accounts that the EFCC had by then traced and seized seems to have been about ₦600 million, for a total, across her 50 or more accounts, of some ₦30 billion. According to a BBC publication the Economic and Financial Crimes Commission had recovered an equivalent of $24million from accounts allegedly linked to Edu. As of the EFCC's April 2024 update, Edu had not been legally charged or fired from her position.

== Awards ==
- Nigeria Quintessential Woman Award, Federal Ministry of Women Affairs and Social Development (2020)
- Award of Excellence, National Youth Council of Nigeria (2020)
- Medical Expert of the Year (2020)
- Award of Excellence in Gender Inclusion, Federal Ministry of Women Affairs (2023)
- Year 2020: Commissioner of the Year UN-SDG
