= Imaan Sulaiman-Ibrahim =

Nigerian politician and minister

Imaan Sulaiman-Ibrahim fsi
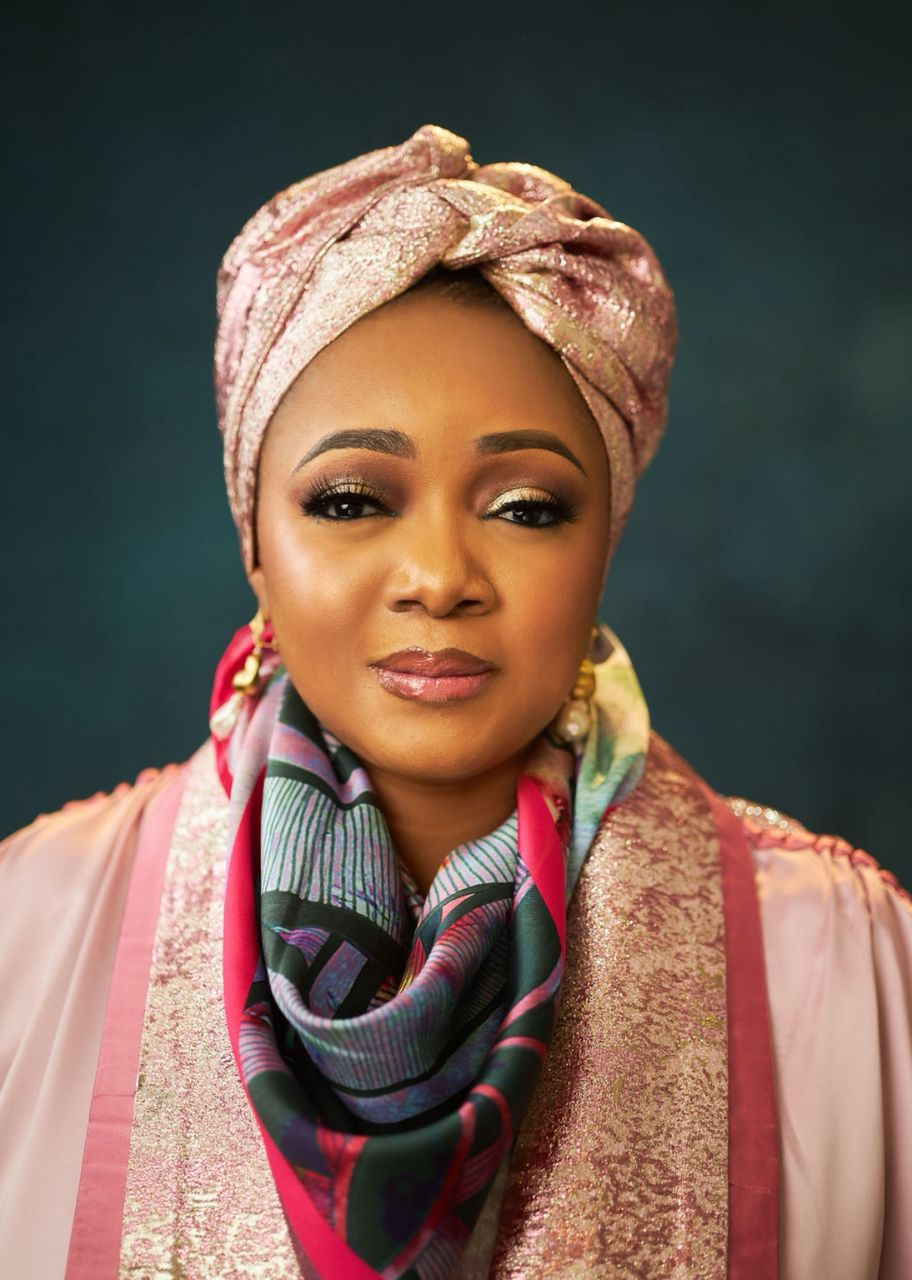

Minister of Women Affairs and Social Development
- Incumbent
- Assumed office October 2024
- President: Bola Tinubu
- Preceded by: Uju Kennedy-Ohanenye

Minister of State for Police Affairs
- In office August 2023 – October 2024
- President: Bola Tinubu

Federal Commissioner, National Commission for Refugees, Migrants and Internally Displaced Persons
- In office May 2021 – October 2024
- President: Muhammadu Buhari

Director-General, NAPTIP
- In office December 2020 – May 2021
- President: Muhammadu Buhari

Personal details
- Born: Plateau State, Nigeria
- Party: All Progressives Congress
- Education: University of Abuja (BSc); Webster University London (MBA, MA); Nigerian Defence Academy (PhD, in view)

Imaan Sulaiman-Ibrahim is a Nigerian politician, serving as Minister of Women Affairs and Social Development of the Federal Republic of Nigeria since October 2024, appointed by President Bola Tinubu. She previously served as Minister of State for Police Affairs from August 2023 to October 2024, becoming the first woman to hold that office.

== Background and personal life ==
Sulaiman-Ibrahim was born in Plateau State, Nigeria, and spent most of her childhood in Abuja. She attended Aruwa Nursery School, Abuja, and Jabi Primary School(now LEA Primary School, Jabi) for her early education. She has described her faith and family as central sources of strength throughout her career, and has spoken publicly about the importance of self-compassion and mentorship for women navigating senior leadership.

== Education ==
Sulaiman-Ibrahim graduated from the University of Abuja with a Bachelor of Science in Sociology at the age of 19. She subsequently earned both a Master of Arts in Management and a Master of Business Administration from Webster University's London Campus, completing both postgraduate degrees by the age of 21. She completed her National Youth Service Corps at the Nigerian National Petroleum Corporation (NNPC) Kaduna Zonal Office.

She is currently finalizing a Doctor of Philosophy at the Nigerian Defence Academy, Zaria, with a dissertation on migration and national security, examining the role of the National Commission for Refugees, Migrants and Internally Displaced Persons from 2007 to 2021.

In 2021, she was admitted as a Fellow of the Security Institute (fsi) upon completion of Executive Intelligence Management Course 14 at the National Institute for Security Studies (NISS), Abuja — the institution where senior military, intelligence, and security officials receive advanced strategic training. She has also been trained in intelligence, forensic investigation, counterterrorism and policing security, and regional disarmament through the [[United Nations Office for Disarmament Affairs]] and the International Academy of Disaster and Safety Professionals (all 2022).

== Career ==
=== Early career (2003–2009) ===
Sulaiman-Ibrahim began her career in Nigeria at the Abuja Geographic Information Systems (AGIS), contributing to the introduction of spatial data infrastructure for the Federal Capital Territory. She subsequently moved to the United Kingdom, working in human resources roles before qualifying as an SAP HR Consultant. She undertook engagements at Nestlé UK (2007), Atlas Copco Belgium (2008), and ERP Labs UK (2008–2009), delivering SAP HCM implementations for multinational corporations across the United Kingdom and Europe.

=== Mary Kay Cosmetics UK (2009–2016) ===
Sulaiman-Ibrahim joined Mary Kay Cosmetics UK in February 2009, progressing from Sales Director to Senior Sales Director and leading sales units of between 250 and 500 people. She served on the UK Advisory Board from 2013 to 2015, participating in quarterly strategy sessions and representing the UK sales force to corporate headquarters. She has cited these years in a women-centred commercial environment as foundational to the mentorship and people-management approach she later brought to public service.

=== Advisory and public service (2019–2020) ===
On returning to Nigeria, Sulaiman-Ibrahim was appointed Special Adviser on Strategic Communication and Partnerships to the Minister of State for Education, Chukwuemeka Nwajiuba. In this role she championed the Alternate School Programme, a strategic intervention to reduce the number of out-of-school children in Nigeria, which received the commendation of the Federal Executive Council.

She also served as a member of the Nasarawa State Investment and Economic Advisory Council from July 2019 to May 2023, appointed by Governor Abdullahi Sule. She supported the establishment of the state's investment one-stop shop, which attracted over USD 2 billion in investments within two years.

=== Director-General, NAPTIP (December 2020 – May 2021) ===
In December 2020, President Muhammadu Buhari appointed Sulaiman-Ibrahim as Director- General of the National Agency for the Prohibition of Trafficking in Persons (NAPTIP). She described the appointment as a "deliberate and passionate commitment to public service" and immediately initiated sweeping reforms aimed at repositioning the agency and elevating Nigeria's standing in the global anti-human trafficking space.

Within six months her leadership produced the following documented outcomes: 313 cases investigated; 429 victims rescued; 462 survivors reunited with their families; 16 convictions secured in court; and 2,422 Nigerians repatriated from situations of exploitation abroad.

Critically, her reforms contributed to Nigeria's upgrade from the Tier 2 Watchlist — a designation that carries the risk of international sanctions — to Tier 2 status (the second-highest ranking) in the United States Department of State [[Trafficking in Persons Report]], the most authoritative annual global assessment of anti-trafficking efforts.

Institutional reforms under her tenure included the restructuring of NAPTIP through new Regional Directorates, State Commands, and Liaison Offices; the launch of integrated digital data management systems (ARES and CRM) and the 627/*627# trafficking hotline, developed in partnership with Expertise France and the United Nations Office on Drugs and Crime (UNODC); the establishment of a NAPTIP Judicial Resource Centre in collaboration with UNODC; the finalisation of the first-ever Violence Against Persons Annual Report 2021; and the securing of 200 acres of land in Nasarawa State for a NAPTIP Training Academy.

=== Federal Commissioner, NCFRMI (May 2021 – October 2024) ===
In May 2021, President Buhari appointed Sulaiman-Ibrahim as Federal Commissioner of the National Commission for Refugees, Migrants and Internally Displaced Persons (NCFRMI). At the time of her appointment, Nigeria was managing one of the largest displacement crises in Africa, with over two million persons internally displaced, the majority in the North-East.

Her most significant achievement in this role was facilitating the passage of the NCFRMI Act 2022 — Nigeria's first dedicated legislative framework for the protection of refugees, migrants, and internally displaced persons — after over fourteen years of failed legislative attempts. She described the legislative passage as requiring the sustained rallying of "government officials, civil society organisations, and other stakeholders" over an extended period.

Further achievements included:

- Programmes reaching over two million persons of concern in Nigeria
- Establishment of Transition Learning Centres for internally displaced children in seven states
- Voluntary repatriation exercises for migrants and refugees from over ten countries
- Declaration of four Nigerian cities as Refugee Friendly Cities
- Securing Nigeria's inclusion in the Rabat Process Steering Committee for EU–Africa dialogue on migration and development — a body Nigeria subsequently came to chair — amplifying Nigeria's voice in continental and global migration governance
- Review of Nigeria's 2015 National Migration Policy and preparation of a National Action Plan on durable solutions

=== Minister of State for Police Affairs (August 2023 – October 2024) ===
President Tinubu appointed Sulaiman-Ibrahim as Minister of State for Police Affairs on 21 August 2023, making her the first woman to hold this position in Nigeria's history.

She described the appointment as entering "one of the most entrenched and male-dominated institutions in the country" and set a clear reform vision: the development of a "world-class Nigeria Police Force that is inclusive, community-based, intelligence-led, and technologically driven and fit for the 21st century".

Key outcomes of her tenure included:

- An unprecedented 1,000 percent increase in revenue allocation to the Ministry of Police Affairs for key reform initiatives
- A Rapid Police Intervention Strategy to mobilise an estimated ₦2 trillion from the private sector for police infrastructure
- National townhalls to strengthen intelligence-sharing between the Nigeria Police Force and local communities
- An enhanced welfare framework and pension reform initiative for Nigeria Police Force personnel

Within four months of taking office, she was presented with a symbol of peace by the German Ambassador to Nigeria in recognition of her contributions to peace and human rights.

=== Minister of Women Affairs and Social Development (October 2024 – present) ===
President Tinubu reappointed Sulaiman-Ibrahim to the Federal Cabinet in October 2024 as Minister of Women Affairs and Social Development. She has described her ministerial vision as building "a Nigeria where every woman, girl, and child can live with dignity, enjoy equal opportunities, and reach their full potential".

==== Nigeria for Women Programme Scale-Up ====
She oversees the implementation of the Nigeria for Women Programme Scale-Up (NFWP-SU), a World Bank-supported programme expanded to all 36 states and the Federal Capital Territory. The programme targets five million women directly, with an estimated indirect impact on over 25 million Nigerians, and is projected to generate approximately four million more and better-paid jobs. Over 4.7 million women were being reached through the programme's flagship interventions as of 2025, through Women's Affinity Groups, Livelihood Collectives, and community-based savings and lending mechanisms.

==== Economic and digital inclusion ====
Sulaiman-Ibrahim has described economic empowerment as "the most ambitious women-focused economic programme in Nigeria's history", targeting ten million women across the country through a suite of interconnected initiatives. These include:

- The Happy Woman App, a digital economic empowerment platform targeting ten million women, providing digital payments, savings records, financial literacy, and enterprise support
- Digital Harmony, targeting five million women in digital literacy
- PowerHer 774, providing clean energy access to all 774 Local Government Areas to reduce time poverty and improve safety for women
- The Women Rise, Innovate and Create (WRIC) initiative, targeting three million women in the creative economy
- The Women in Green Economy Programme, engaging one million women in climate-smart agriculture and transitioning one million households to clean cooking energy
- Establishment of 45 rice-processing centres across six states and Women Resource Centres in all 774 Local Government Areas

==== Social protection ====
She launched the Renewed Hope Social Impact Interventions – 774 (RH-SII774), a flagship programme designed to reach 50 million women, children, and vulnerable persons across all 774 Local Government Areas of Nigeria, integrating clean energy, agriculture, child advancement, and family-strengthening components. Over 666,000 women, families, and children have been reached with food, palliatives, and livelihood kits across 21 states, including training and empowerment for widows of fallen security personnel.

==== Gender policy and advocacy ====
Sulaiman-Ibrahim has publicly advocated for gender quotas in political appointments and leadership positions, stating: "I advocate consistently for gender quotas in political appointments and leadership positions." She has reported that a Nigerian state governor committed — as a direct result of her advocacy — to appointing women as Vice Chairpersons in all Local Government Areas, describing such outcomes as the model of change that "must become the norm". She is working to integrate gender budgeting into national and sub-national fiscal frameworks to ensure equitable resource allocation across government.

==== Legal and policy reform ====
Under her tenure the Ministry has:

- Supported nationwide implementation of the Violence Against Persons (Prohibition) Act (VAPP) and initiated a comprehensive review of the Child Rights Act (2003)
- Rolled out over multiple child-safeguarding interventions and hosted the First African Regional Meeting on Ending Violence Against Children
- Launched a National Care Economy Framework to unlock women's productive potential and redistribute unpaid care work
- Released the State of the Nigerian Girl Report II (2025) and the Alternative Care for Children in Nigeria Guidelines
- Revived the Nigerian Children's Parliament after years of inactivity
- Developed a five-year strategic roadmap for the Ministry

==== Child protection ====
The Ministry under her tenure has maintained full government sponsorship for the 109 rescued Chibok Girls enrolled at the American University of Nigeria, Yola. She rehabilitated and reintegrated 500 families through Gender-Based Violence shelters and advocated for the release of minors detained during protests.

==== UNSCR 1325 ====
She launched Nigeria's Third National Action Plan on UNSCR 1325 on Women, Peace and Security, with a live digital monitoring and evaluation dashboard tracking implementation across all relevant ministries, departments, and agencies — described as moving the commitment from "a statement of intent" to "a live accountability framework".

==== International engagement ====
She led Nigeria's delegation to the Commission on the Status of Women 69th Session (CSW69) at the United Nations and has championed Nigeria's commitments under the Beijing Platform for Action, the UN Women Agenda, and the African Union's Agenda 2063. She has aligned Nigeria's national programmes with over 15 international commitments and more than 10 domestic laws and policies.

== Academic and teaching roles ==
Sulaiman-Ibrahim is a Visiting Lecturer at the Sultan Maccido Institute for Peace, Leadership, and Development Studies, University of Abuja, where she teaches postgraduate students on global migration governance and national security. She also serves as a Visiting Lecturer at the Sapienza University of Rome, Italy, contributing expertise on migration, security, and gender policy to an international academic audience.

== Civic engagement ==
=== The Beehive Initiative ===
Sulaiman-Ibrahim is co-founder of The Beehive Initiative (est. February 2018), described as "a civic engagement platform to build an army of politically inclined and competent women, fully charged, fit and ready to serve humanity on all planes of political participation and in all aspects of social and economic development to achieve gender balance in politics and governance."

=== Political career ===
Sulaiman-Ibrahim is a chieftain of the All Progressives Congress (APC). In 2018, she contested the APC primary election for the House of Representatives seat for the Keffi/Karu/Kokona Federal Constituency in Nasarawa State.

== Honours and recognition ==
- Vanguard Public Servant of the Year 2026 for outstanding performance as Minister of Women Affairs and Social Development
- Blueprint Newspaper Female Politician of the Year 2022
- Fellow of the Security Institute — National Institute for Security Studies, Abuja, 2021; one of Nigeria's most selective security and intelligence credentials
- Presidential birthday tribute — President Tinubu publicly saluted the Minister on her birthday, describing her contributions to national development
- Symbol of peace from the German Ambassador to Nigeria, presented within four months of her appointment as Minister of Police Affairs in recognition of her contributions to peace and human rights
- Birthday recognition by national media including The Nation and BellaNaija for her contributions to women's advancement in Nigeria

== See also ==
- National Agency for the Prohibition of Trafficking in Persons
- Nigeria Police Force
- United Nations Security Council Resolution 1325

== Publications ==
- Sulaiman-Ibrahim, I., Adejoh, S., & Muhammed-Soso, N. O. (forthcoming). Conflict, Disaster and Humanitarian Response in Nigeria. Festschrift in Honour of Sadiya Umar Farouq.
- Migration and National Security: Assessing the Role of the National Commission for Refugees, Migrants and Internally Displaced Persons (NCFRMI), 2007–2021. Ongoing PhD thesis, Nigerian Defence Academy, Zaria.
- Motivation and Employees Productivity: A Case Study of Marks and Spencer Plc UK. Unpublished MA thesis, Webster University, London Campus, 2001.
- Birth Control Measures and Its Cultural Acceptability: A Case Study of Gwagwalada Area Council, Abuja FCT. Unpublished BSc thesis, University of Abuja, 1999.
