= Frederikshavn =

- Town
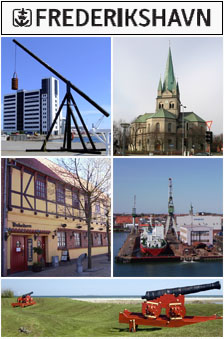
- From upper left: Kattegat Silo, Frederikshavn Church, Havnegade, Port of Frederikshavn, Nordre Skanse

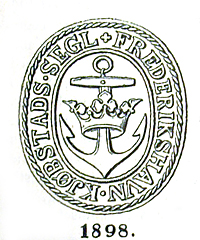
- Seal Coat of arms

- Location within Denmark Location within North Jutland Region
- Coordinates: 57.441°N 10.534°E
- Country: Denmark
- Region: North Denmark
- Municipality: Frederikshavn
- City Status: 1818
- Named for: King Frederik VI

Government
  - Type: Magistrate
  - Mayor: Karsten Thomsen (S)

Area
  - Urban: 13.6 km^{2} (5.3 sq mi)
  - Municipal: 651.04 km^{2} (251.37 sq mi)
- Elevation: 7 m (23 ft)

Population (2026-01-01)
  - Rank: Denmark: 30th
  - Urban: 22,496
  - Urban density: 1,650/km^{2} (4,280/sq mi)
  - Gender: 11,268 males and 11,228 females
- Demonym: Frederikshavner
- Time zone: UTC+1 (CET)
  - Summer (DST): UTC+2 (CEST)
- Postal code: 9900
- Area code: (+45) 98
- Website: Official website

Frederikshavn (Danish: [fʁeðʁeksˈhɑwˀn, fʁæðʁæksˈhɑwˀn]) is a Danish town in Frederikshavn municipality, Region Nordjylland, on the northeast coast on the North Jutlandic Island in northern Denmark. Its name translates to "Frederik's harbor". It was originally named Fladstrand.

The town has a population of 22,496 (1 January 2026), and is an important traffic portal with its ferry connections to Gothenburg in Sweden. The town is well known for fishing and its fishing and industrial harbours.

Frederikshavn's oldest district, Fiskerklyngen, is originally from the mid-16th century, but the houses now there are from 18th–19th centuries.

== History ==
Frederikshavn was originally called Fladstrand (lit. "Flat beach") from its location in Flade parish.

Historical population
Year	Pop.	±% p.a.
1696	565	—
1715	788	+1.77%
1769	525	−0.75%
1801	463	−0.39%
1818	600	+1.54%
1834	1,163	+4.22%
1840	1,247	+1.17%
1845	1,332	+1.33%
1850	1,374	+0.62%
1855	1,467	+1.32%
1860	1,843	+4.67%
1870	2,133	+1.47%
1880	2,891	+3.09%
1890	4,848	+5.31%
1901	6,538	+2.76%
1911	7,916	+1.93%
1916	8,560	+1.58%
1921	9,411	+1.91%
1925	9,650	+0.63%
1930	9,882	+0.48%
1935	10,500	+1.22%
1940	15,275	+7.79%
1945	16,827	+1.95%
1950	18,388	+1.79%
1955	20,212	+1.91%
1960	22,570	+2.23%
1965	24,379	+1.55%
1970	24,848	+0.38%
1976	25,316	+0.31%
1981	24,938	−0.30%
1986	25,137	+0.16%
1990	25,137	+0.00%
1996	24,935	−0.13%
2000	24,680	−0.26%
2006	23,636	−0.72%
2010	23,331	−0.32%
2015	23,345	+0.01%
2020	23,124	−0.19%
Source: 1696,1715,1769,1801,1818-1845,1850,1855-1860,1870—1916,1921—1950,1950-1970,1976—2000, 2006, 2010—

=== Fladstrand ===
The first mention of a settlement is in a letter dated 13 March 1572 found in the Danish chancery letterbooks. It was a fishing village, trading place and crossing point to Norway.

The old Fladstrand church was built between 1686 and 1690. On 31 December 1700 a tax of 500 rigsdaler was put on the town which indicates a fair amount of trade.

During the Great Nordic War from 1700 to 1721 the town saw a rise in activity as travellers to Norway embarked from here as the route over Sweden was cut. The activity slowly subsided after the war.

A royal maritime pilot was stationed at the town from 1733 after King Christian VI was forced to stay in the town due to bad weather on his journey to Norway.

In 1735 the town was described as a hamlet which supports itself on fishing and beaching of scows and some farming (fæstebønder).

=== Military history in 17th, 18th and 19th centuries ===
Due to its advantageous proximity to the entrance to the Baltic Sea, Frederikshavn has historically been a naval base of some strategic importance.

In 1627 under Kejserkrigen, Melchior von Hatzfeldt troops built a Sconce north of the fishing village. The sconce became known as Nordre Skanse and is preserved to this day. After the war this was manned by Danish troops. In 1675 the fortification was expanded with a sconse south of the harbour. Between 1686 and 1687 the fortification was expanded again with a heavy tower, a wall and a port. It was described as a citadel. The tower is known as Krudttårnet, (lit. "Gunpowder Tower"). In 1891 the wall and port was demolished, but the tower has been preserved. Krudttårnet is incorporated in the municipality's coat-of-arms.

During the Great Nordic War from 1700 to 1721 Peter Tordenskjold barricaded himself here in his fights against Sweden. In 1712 the Battle of Fladstrand was fought in the nearby sea between Swedish and Danish naval forces.

In 1735, 50 Danish men were stationed at the fortress. From the middle of the 18th century the military importance of the citadel was dwindling and some of the fortifications and building was disposed of. It gained new importance during the Gunboat War from 1807 to 1814, but its value diminished again after the war. The citadel was discontinued in 1864.

=== Market town ===
During the Gunboat War, the town saw increasing trade and activity. The first artificial harbour was constructed from 1808 to 1810 due to the war and after several years of strong promotion of the local merchant Frantz Übersax.

Denmark's defeat in the war had a great impact in Fladstrand. The military left and the town largest source of income ceased. Denmark's general economic crisis worsened the situation. The town did not have status as a market town, but trade, craft and other activities exclusive to market towns had happened unlawful in Fladstrand for several decades anyway. A majority of the population had livelihoods based on crafts, services and trade, not production. This was used by the local civil servant as an argument for giving the town market town status (Danish: købstadsrettigheder). The harbour directorate (Danish: Kanal-, havne- og fyrdirektionen) argued that it was a strategic place for a harbour and giving the town market town status and legalising the current activities would help with the upkeep.

On 25 September 1818 (Note: A printed widely circulated announcement was wrongly dated 23 September 1818.) Frederik VI bestowed the town status as a market town under the name of Frederikshavn.

=== From 1818 ===
During the German occupation of Denmark, German forces built a group of fortifications called Stützpunktgruppe Frederikshavn Süd, otherwise known by its Danish name, Fort Bangsbo. During the 1970s the ship yard wanted to expand with a dry dock at the location of Krudttårnet. Between 1974 and 1976 the engineering firm Kampsax and the local contractor Trigon encased the tower in concrete and moved it 270m along teflon rails to its current location. The project was delayed when a storm broke a retaining wall between Christmas and New Year 1975 filling the new dry dock with water and causing the base beneath the tower to collapse. The movement was celebrated 5. August 1976 with the visit from Margrethe II of Denmark and her family.

Stena Line operated a ferry service from Frederikshavn to Oslo, Norway from 1979 to March 14, 2020. It was served by three different ferries named Stena Saga. From 1979 to 1988 by former M/S Patricia built in 1967. From 1988 to 1994 by later MS Stena Europe. From 1994 to 2020 it was served by MS Stena Saga. It was first closed temporary due to the coronavirus pandemic. The decision to close it permanently was announced a few days later on March 19. The Oslo route was reopened by DFDS Seaways on June 25, 2020 by the ferries traveling to and from Copenhagen which began stopping in Frederikshavn. There is a single departure and arrival per day. The route is serviced by MS Pearl Seaways and MS Crown Seaways.

== Economy ==
Frederikshavn relative to the five largest cities in Denmark. It is north of Aalborg, northwest of Copenhagen and west of Sweden.

Companies in the area include MAN/BW Alpha and the Navy Base Frederikshavn (Flådestation Frederikshavn).

Frederikshavn, like the rest of North Jutland, was hit with hard unemployment. The town's largest workplace, the shipyard Danyard, closed in the late 1990s. This resulted in more than 2,000 workers being unemployed. Today there is still activity at the large ship building area, with many small companies renting space there. In summer 2008, the unemployment rate, like the rest of Denmark, fell to a minimum low record of approximately 2%.

As with many provincial municipalities around the world, some of its young people leave to large urban cities. However, the municipality is currently engaged in many innovative projects which are attracting tourists and aim to retain population.

Frederikshavn is currently beginning a transition to make it the first medium-sized city/large town in the world to rely exclusively on renewable energy resources for power, including transportation and cars. The process is expected to be completed by 2030. As of 2010, the city was powered 18% by renewable energy.

Martin Professional had a large presence before its closure in 2016.

== In culture ==
The Danish term: frederikshavner, lit. 'Someone from Frederikshavn' is used to denote a quality plaice. It is probably the most popular fish eaten in Denmark.

The drama television series Norskov (2015–2017) was filmed in and around Frederikshavn.

== Attractions ==
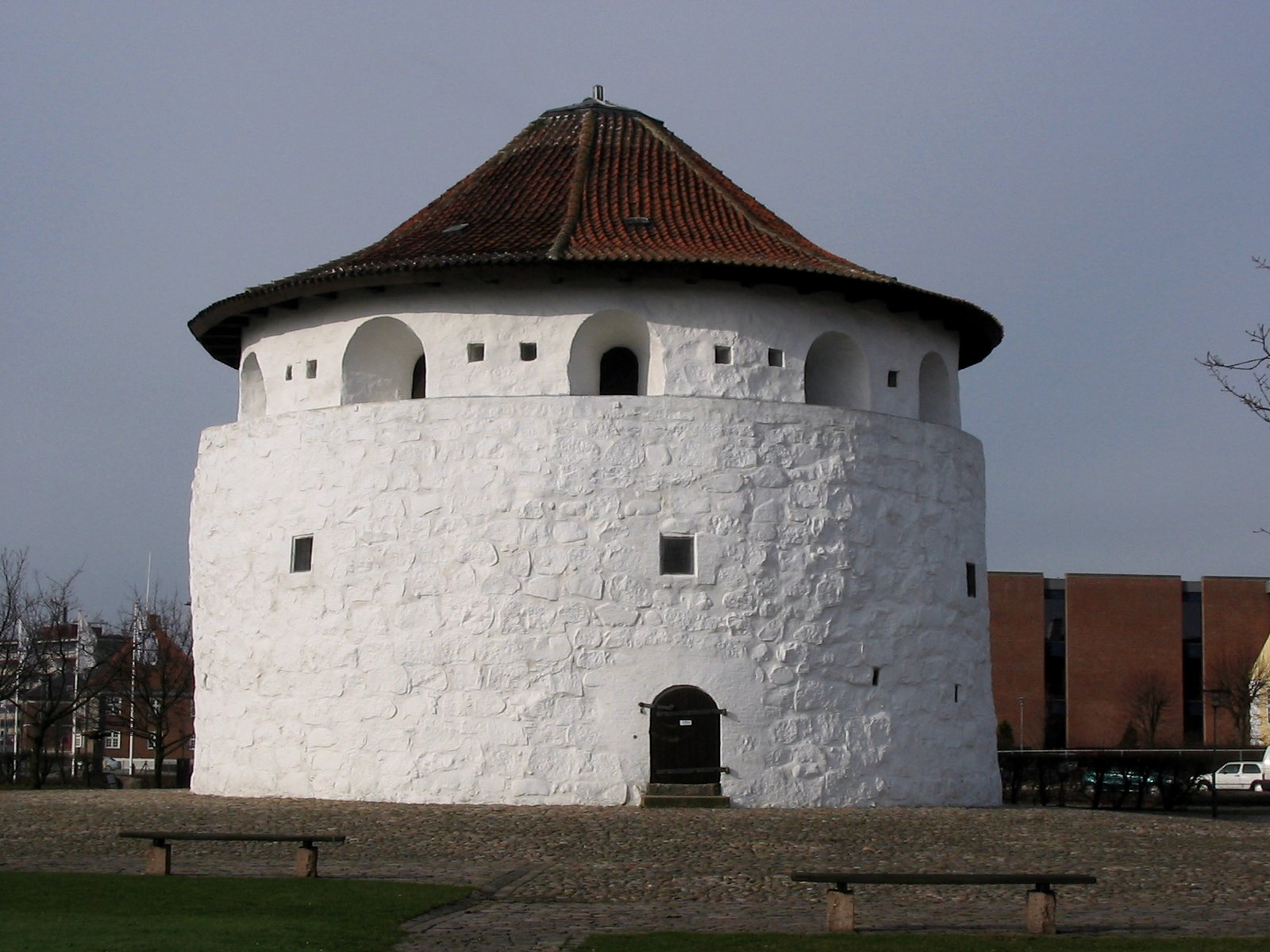
Krudttårnet, The Powder Tower, constructed in 1688

- Bangsbo Museum
- Frederikshavn Art Museum (Frederikshavn Kunstmuseum)
- Frederikshavn Shipyard Historical Society (Værftshistorisk Selskab Frederikshavn)
- Tordenskiold Festival, celebrated since 1998.
- Lighting Festival, biannual festival.
- Bangsbo Flower Festival
- Bangsbo Fort
- Bangsbo Botanical Garden

== Sports ==
Frederikshavn White Hawks are the local professional ice hockey team playing in the premier Danish ice hockey league, Metal Ligaen.

== Infrastructure ==
=== Transportation ===
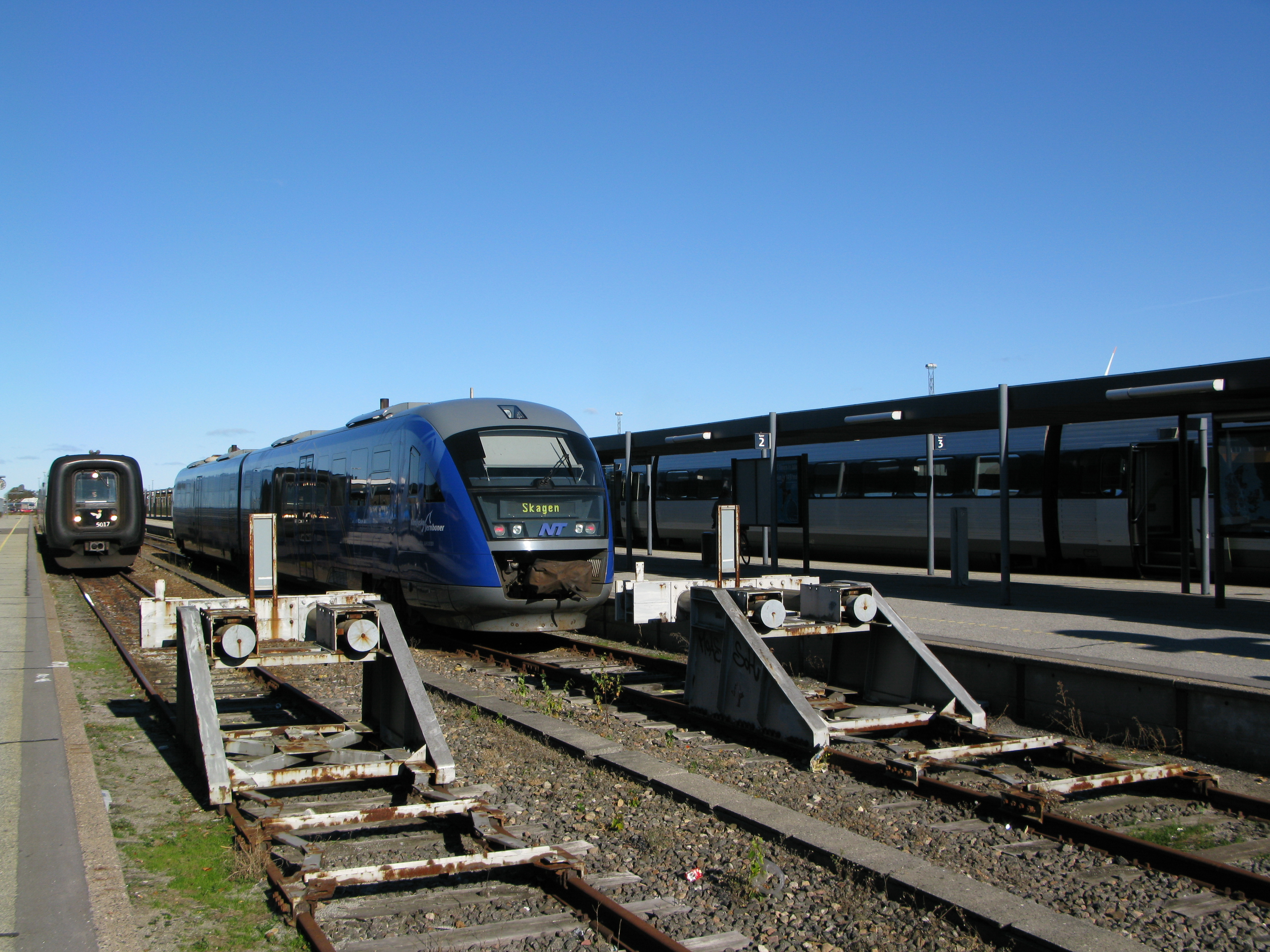
Frederikshavn railway station

Three major roads connect Frederikshavn. E 45 connects to Aalborg in the south. Frederikshavn is the northern end of E 45 in Denmark. The route continues via the ferry in Gothenburg. Danish national road 35 connects Hjørring to the west. Danish national road 40 connects Skagen to the north. A secondary route connects to Brønderslev towards southwest.

Frederikshavn is served by Frederikshavn railway station. It is the terminal train station of the Vendsyssel and Skagen railway lines and offers direct InterCity services to Copenhagen, regional train services to Aalborg and local train services to Skagen.

Ferry service to Gothenburg, in Sweden with StenaLine and Oslo, in Norway with DFDS. There is also a ferry service to the Island of Læsø.

The nearest airport with scheduled national and international flights is Aalborg Airport 66 km away.

=== Port of Frederikshavn ===
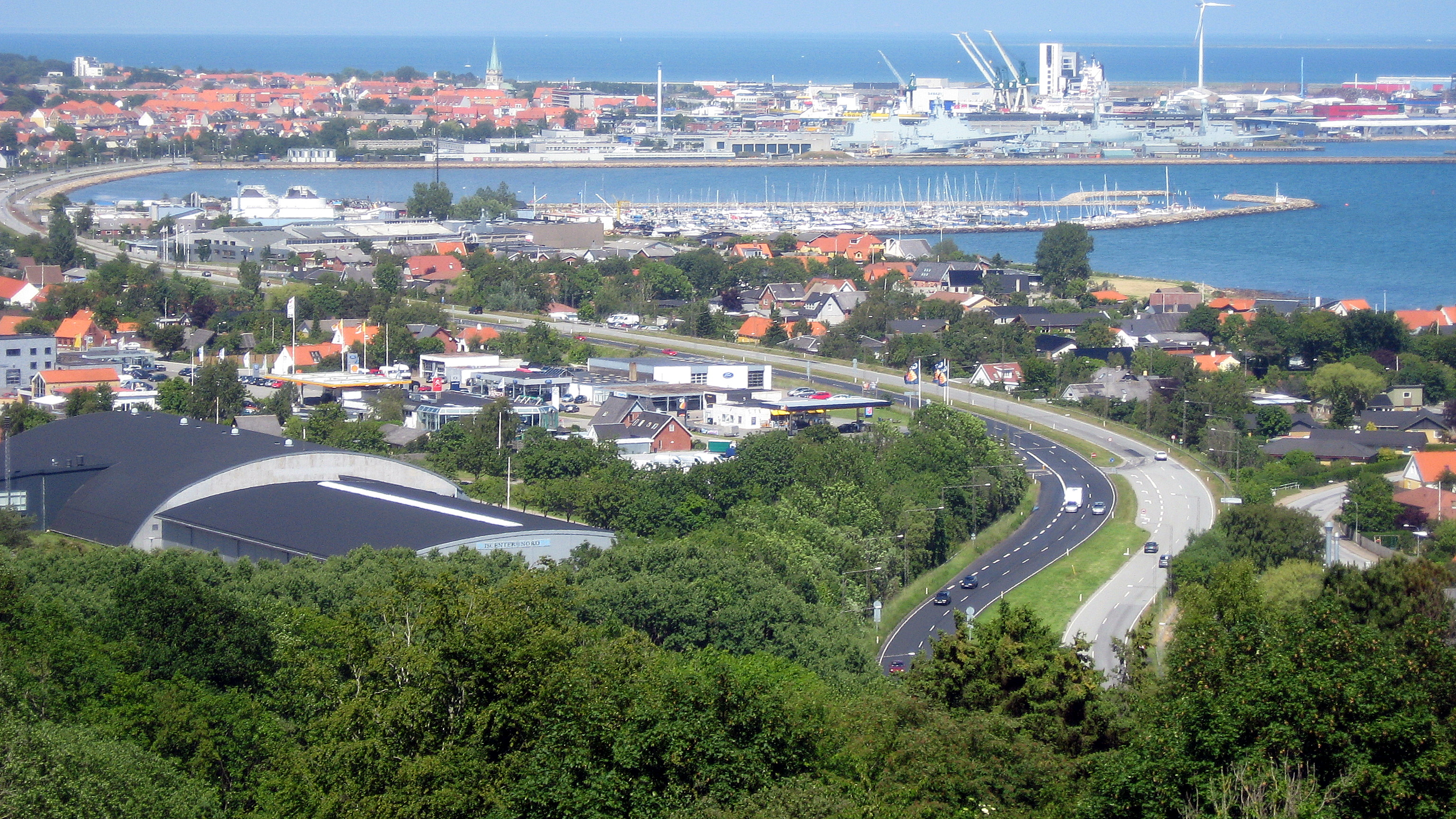
A view over Frederikshavn

Port of Frederikshavn is the largest harbour in Frederikshavn. It is a commercial port owned by Frederikshavn Municipality. It includes a ferry harbour, a cargo harbour and a large service industry. It has historically been dominated by the shipyard industry and fishing. Frederikshavn was in the late 19th century the dominant harbour for large fishing vessels in Denmark. The European shipyard industry was hit with difficulties in the 1980s and Danyard, the largest shipyard in Frederikshavn closed in December 1999. The municipality took over the harbour from the state in 2001. The site of the former Danyard was over the next 20 years transformed into a business park and the activity gradually went from manufacturing to service.

=== 2015–2020 port expansion ===
In 2015 a large expansion of the port was started. The first of three phases was constructed from 2015 to 2018 by contractor Per Aarsleff. The official delivery from the contractor was on 8 June 2018. The officially inauguration coincided with the towns 200 year anniversary as a merchant town on 25 September 2018. The expansion makes it possible to receive larger ships and offshore installations, handle more bulk material and a flexible area for projects. The first phase added 330.000 square metre hinterland and 600 metre of quay with a water depth 11 metre. Most of the quay and hinterland areas in the first phase have been leased by Louisiana-based Modern American Recycling Services for an 11-year period.

In July 2018 they secured a contract to scrap the two platforms from Tyra Field. They are expected to begin the first recycling assignment in 2020 and create more than 200 jobs. Construction of Scandinavia's largest bunkering terminal is underway on the new area. It will consists of 11 storage tanks with a combined capacity of 744000 m^{3}. It is scheduled for completion by the end of 2020. It will be leased to Stena Oil. In November 2018 all the hinterland areas of the first phase have been leased. Five 2000 m^{2} large warehouses have been constructed on the new area.

The planning of the second stage of the expansion was started in June 2017. Construction started in October 2017. It is nearly completed as of December 2019. The second phase will add 170.000 square metre of hinterland and 400 metre of quay. The quay constructed in phase one will be deepened to 14 metres.

When the second phase is complete the total area of the harbour will be 950,000 square metres (10,200,000 sq ft).

A further expansion in third phase is an option if there is demand.

=== Naval Base ===
South of the commercial port is Danish Navy Naval Harbour Frederikshavn. It is home to Danish navy 1st Squadron and Naval Operational Logistic Support Structure, OPLOG FRH. It is also the home location for the training ship Danmark and the royal yacht Dannebrog. It was home to the national icebreakers before their decommission in 2012.

The naval harbour was inaugurated on 2 October 1962.

=== Marinas ===
The also town has a number of smaller marinas (listed in order from north to south):

- Rønner Harbour (Rønnerhavn): pleasureboat, dinghy and fishing harbour
- Northern Entrenchment Harbour (Nordre Skanse Havn): dinghy harbour
- Frederikshavn Marina (Frederikshavn Marina): pleasureboat, dinghy and houseboat harbour
- Neppen's Harbour (Neppens Havn): dinghy harbour

== Education ==
- EUC Nord - a technical school located partly in Frederikshavn

== Media ==
- Kanal Frederikshavn

== Notable people ==
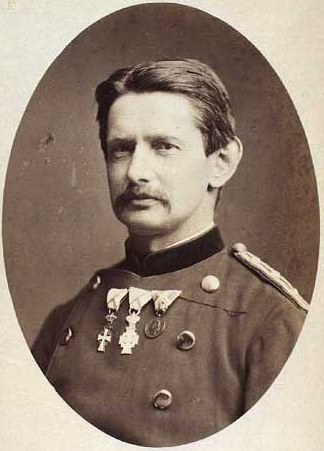
Christian Arendrup

- Thorald Læssøe (1816–1878), landscape painter
- Christian Henrik Arendrup (1837–1913), Governor-General of The Danish West Indies 1881–1893
- Karl Bovin (1907–1985), painter, key member the Odsherred Painters
- Elsa Gress (1919–1988), essayist, novelist and dramatist
- Allan Olsen (born 1956), pop musician
- Henrik I. Christensen (born 1962), roboticist in San Diego, California
- Connie Nielsen (born 1965), actress
- Anja Ringgren Lovén (born 1978), protects children accused of being witches in Nigeria
- Ditte Ejlerskov (born 1982), contemporary artist

=== Sport ===
- Gustaf Nielsen (1910–1973), sports shooter
- Harald Nielsen (1941–2015), footballer
- Søren Frederiksen (born 1972), football player and manager
- Peter Møller (born 1972), footballer and sports journalist
- Lotte Kiærskou (born 1975), handballer, twice Olympic winner
- Gitte Aaen (born 1981), handballer
- Mads Christensen (born 1984), ice hockey player
- Hans-Kristian Vittinghus (born 1986), badminton player
- Lise Munk (born 1989), footballer
- Lucas Bjerregaard (born 1991), golfer

== Twin towns – sister cities ==
Frederikshavn practices twinning on the municipal level. For the twin towns, see twin towns of Frederikshavn Municipality.

== See also ==
- Ports of the Baltic Sea
