= Federal Ministry of Humanitarian Affairs, Disaster Management and Social Development =

Nigerian government ministry

Ministry of Humanitarian Affairs and Poverty Reduction
- Coat of arms of Nigeria

Agency overview
- Jurisdiction: Government of Nigeria
- Headquarters: Federal Secretariat Abuja
- Minister responsible: Nentawe Yilwatda
- Agency executives: Permanent secretary
- Website: www.fmhds.gov.ng

The Federal Ministry of Humanitarian Affairs and Poverty Reduction is a Nigerian ministry whose mission is to develop humanitarian policies and provide effective coordination of national and international humanitarian interventions. It was established on Wednesday, 21 August 2019, by an executive pronouncement by the President and Commander-in-Chief of the Armed Forces of Nigeria, Muhammadu Buhari at the inauguration of Ministers for the Federal Republic of Nigeria.

It is headed by a Minister appointed by the President, assisted by a Permanent Secretary, who is a career civil servant. On 24 August 2019, President Buhari swore in Dr. Sadiya Umar Farouq as the Minister of Humanitarian Affairs, Disaster Management and Social Development with Dr.(Mrs) Bashir Nura Alkali as the permanent secretary in the ministry.

In August 2023, Betta Edu was sworn in by President Bola Ahmed Tinubu as the new Minister of Humanitarian Affairs and Poverty Alleviation.

The current Minister of Humanitarian Affairs and Poverty Reduction is Professor Nentawe Goshwe Yilwatda. President Tinubu appointed him in October 2024 to replace Betta Edu.

== Agencies ==
1. National Commission for Refugees, Migrants, and Internally Displaced Persons
2. North-East Development Commission
3. National Emergency Management Agency
4. National Senior Citizens Centre
5. National Commission for Person with Disabilities
