= Joint National Association of Persons with Disabilities =

Disability organization in Nigeria

- Founded: 1992
- Purpose: People with disabilities
- Location: Abuja (headquarters)
- Region served: Nigeria
- Key people: Abdullahi Aliyu Usman, National President

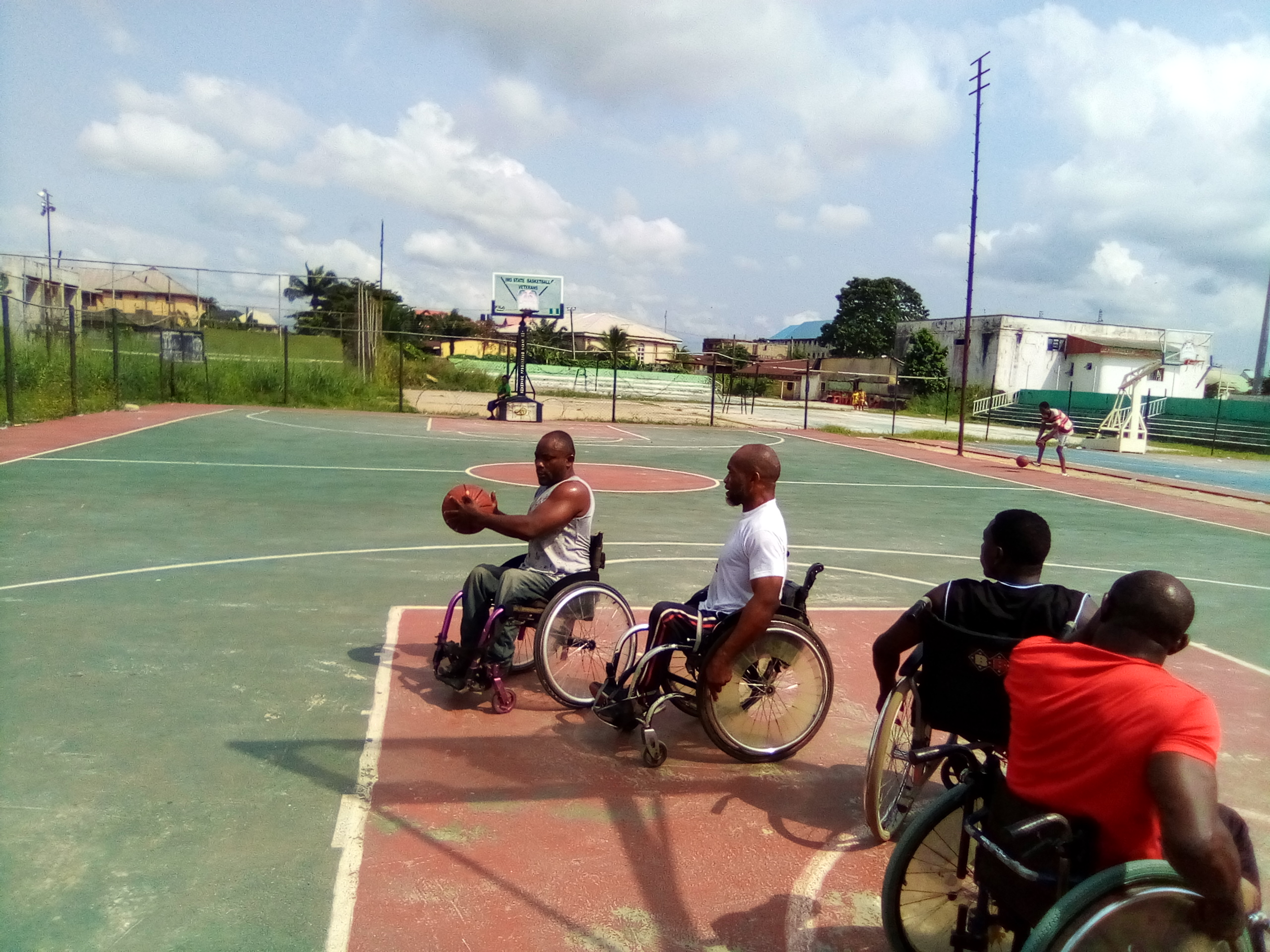
A basketball game with wheelchair players organized by JONAPWD

The Joint National Association of Persons with Disabilities (JONAPWD) is the umbrella organization established in 1992 that brings together all disability institutions in Nigeria. The national headquarters is located in Abuja and its current national president is Abdullahi Aliyu Usman. Internationally, the organization is a member of the Commonwealth Disabled People's Forum and the African Disability Forum.

The main activities they carry out revolve around raising awareness of the existence of people with disabilities throughout the country, promoting their rights with the creation of laws and regulations according to their needs, in order to socially integrate them into national public life and they also support research on the different challenges and problems they face in daily life, all of the above with the aim of improving the quality of life of disabled people.

== Advocacy ==
Among the specific activities they have carried out in Nigerian territory is to address some challenges faced by people with any type of disability. For example, they have accompanied passengers to Nigerian airports, such as the Nnamdi Azikiwe International Airport, where they have made public the needs that people with reduced mobility and hearing impairment require to board a plane.

In the field of politics, the leaders of the organization have publicly requested through the media that penalties be toughened and that there be effective jail time for those convicted of diverting public funds intended for people with disabilities.
