= National Commission for Refugees, Migrants, and Internally Displaced Persons =

Agency overview
- Formed: 1989
- Type: Management of Migrants and Refugees
- Jurisdiction: Federal Government of Nigeria
- Headquarters: Abuja, FCT, Nigeria
- Parent agency: Federal Ministry of Humanitarian Affairs, Disaster Management and Social Development

The National Commission for Refugees, Migrants, and Internally Displaced Persons (NCFRMI), formerly known as the National Commission for Refugees (NCFR), is a Nigerian federal agency, established by Decree 52 of 1989 now NCFRMI Act of 2022, to manage, protect, and assist refugees, asylum seekers, returnees, stateless persons, and internally displaced persons (IDPs), and serve as Nigeria’s coordinating agency for migration management.

The agency is one of the six agencies under the supervision of the Federal Ministry of Humanitarian Affairs, Disaster Management and Social Development. It is headed by a Federal Commissioner.

== Origin ==
The National Commission for Refugees, Migrants, and Internally Displaced Persons was established by the Federal Government of Nigeria to fulfil the United Nations General Assembly Resolution 319(IV) under Article 35 of the United Nations 1951 Convention. The agency was formerly known for managing only refugee affairs but was later expanded in 2002 by the former President of Nigeria, Chief Olusegun Obasanjo. In 2021, President Muhammadu Buhari appointed Hon. Imaan Sulaiman-Ibrahim as the Federal Commissioner of the agency.

== Roles and responsibilities ==
The National Commission for Refugees, Migrants and Internally Displaced Persons is responsible for the coordination and implementation of national measures relating to the protection, assistance, rehabilitation, return, reintegration and resettlement of refugees, asylum seekers, migrants, returnees, stateless persons and internally displaced persons in Nigeria. Its functions include providing protection and assistance to persons of concern, supporting durable solutions, facilitating access to relevant services, and working with federal, state and non-governmental actors in the management of displacement and migration-related situations.

Under the National Commission for Refugees, Migrants and Internally Displaced Persons Act, 2022, the Commission’s mandate extends beyond refugee protection to include broader migration management and the welfare of victims of displacement. The Act provides a legal basis for the Commission’s role in matters relating to refugees, migrants and internally displaced persons, including their reception, care, rehabilitation, return, reintegration and resettlement. The Act also identifies relevant international instruments on refugees, stateless persons and related persons of concern as part of the legal framework for the Commission’s work.

In the area of migration governance, the Commission serves as a coordinating institution for migration management in Nigeria. It works with relevant ministries, departments and agencies, development partners, civil society organisations and other stakeholders through national migration coordination structures. These functions include supporting policy development, promoting orderly and rights-based migration management, coordinating return and reintegration processes, and contributing to the implementation of national migration policies and related frameworks.

== Organization ==
The Commission’s work is organised around three broad operational areas: refugees and asylum seekers, migration management, and internally displaced persons. These areas reflect the expanded mandate of the National Commission for Refugees, Migrants and Internally Displaced Persons under the NCFRMI Act, 2022, which provides for the management, rehabilitation, return, reintegration and resettlement of refugees, migrants and victims of displacement.

=== Refugees and asylum seekers ===
The refugees and asylum seekers component covers the protection, reception, registration and documentation of refugees and asylum seekers in Nigeria. The Commission is the national authority responsible for registering asylum seekers and issuing documentation to asylum seekers and refugees, while immigration authorities may refer persons seeking asylum to the nearest NCFRMI office for registration and status determination. In this role, the Commission works with UNHCR and other partners to support protection, assistance and durable solutions for persons seeking or granted international protection in Nigeria.

=== Migration ===
The migration component relates to the Commission’s role in migration management, including return, readmission, reintegration and coordination with national and international partners. The NCFRMI Act, 2022 recognises migrants within the Commission’s mandate and provides for their management, rehabilitation, return, reintegration and resettlement. The National Migration Policy 2015 also identifies the NCFRMI as the coordinating agency for migration management in Nigeria, giving it a central role in supporting policy implementation and inter-agency coordination on migration matters.

=== Internally displaced persons ===
The internally displaced persons component concerns the protection and assistance of persons displaced within Nigeria as a result of conflict, insecurity, disasters, environmental factors or other humanitarian situations. The Commission’s work in this area includes support for protection, care, rehabilitation, resettlement and durable solutions for displaced persons and affected communities. Public statements on federal humanitarian policy have also described Nigeria’s response for refugees and IDPs as being anchored on protection, livelihoods and durable solutions, implemented through relevant institutions including the NCFRMI.

== List of Agency Commissioners ==
The past and present Federal Commissioner of the agency include:

- Tijani Aliyu Ahmed (2023 - )
- Imaan Sulaiman-Ibrahim (2021 - 2023)
- Senator Basheer Garba Mohammed (Lado) (2019 - 2021)
- Sadiya Umar Farouq (2016 - 2019)
- Hajiya Hadiza Sani Kangiwa (2012 - 2016)
