= Sadiya Umar Farouq =

Nigerian politician and business administrator (born 1974)

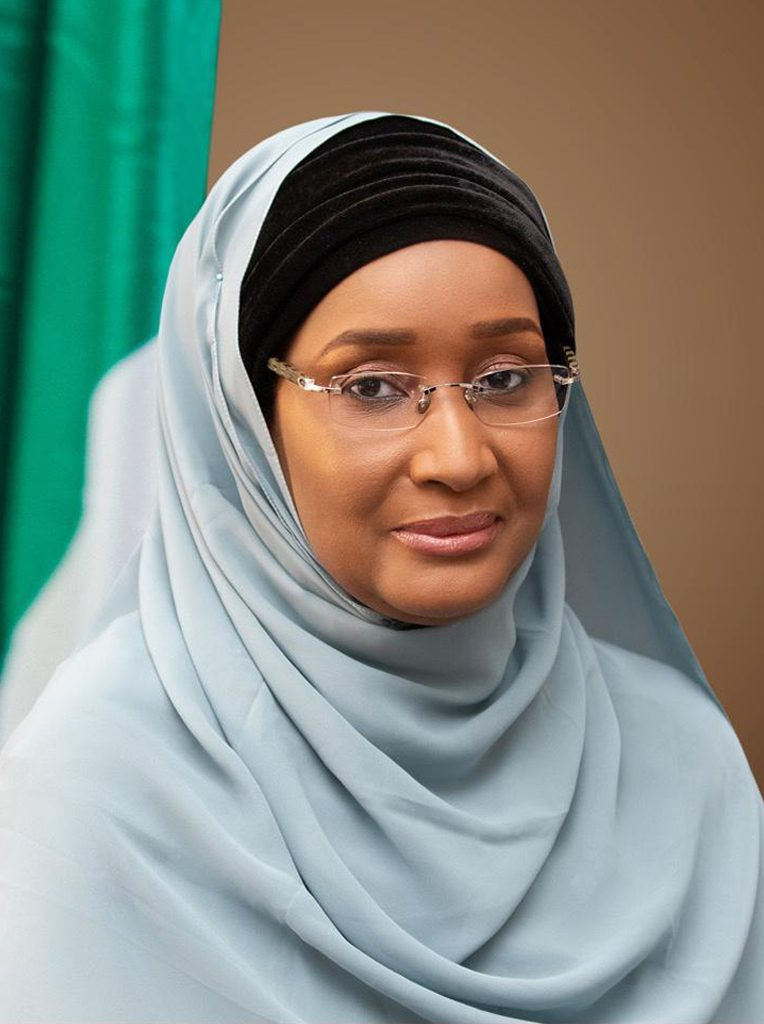

Minister of Humanitarian Affairs, Disaster Management and Social Development
- In office 21 August 2019 – 29 May 2023
- President: Muhammadu Buhari
- Preceded by: Position established
- Succeeded by: Betta Edu

Federal Commissioner of the National Commission for Refugees, Migrants, and Internally Displaced Persons
- In office September 2016 – July 2019
- President: Muhammadu Buhari

Personal details
- Born: 5 November 1974 (age 51) Zurmi, Zamfara State, Nigeria
- Party: All Progressives Congress
- Education: Ahmadu Bello University
- Occupation: Politician

Sadiya Umar Farouq (born 5 November 1974) is a Nigerian politician who served as the Pioneer Minister of Humanitarian Affairs, Disaster Management and Social Development.

Appointed by President Muhammadu Buhari in July 2019, Farouq was the youngest minister in the federal cabinet during the regime of President Muhammadu Buhari. She served as Federal Commissioner of the National Commission for Refugees, Migrants, and Internally Displaced Persons from October 2016 to August 2019.

Her work with President Buhari dates back to Buhari's days as the leader and presidential candidate of the defunct Congress for Progressive Change when Farouq was the national treasurer of CPC and later national treasurer of the All Progressives Congress.

She was declared "Wanted" by the Economic and Financial Crime Commission (EFCC) on 9th May 2026 for fraud related cases.

== Background ==
Saadiya Umar Farouq born on 5 November 1974 in Zurmi, Local Government Area of Zamfara State. She attended Federal Government Girls College Gusau, Zamfara State, and later proceed to Ahmadu Bello University, Zaria, where she graduated with a BSc in business administration in 1998 and also successfully completed her master's degree MSc in the same university in international affairs and diplomacy in 2008 and another master's in business administration MBA in 2009.

== Early career ==
Saadiya Umar Farouq completed a one-year mandatory service at the National Assembly, where she later worked at the National Assembly Service Commission as an Administrative Officer 2 in 2003, and was later promoted to Principal Administrative Officer. Between 1999 and 2000, she worked with the Senate Committee on Aviation and the Senate Committee on Appropriation. From 2001 to 2003, she served as Operations Manager at Pinnacle Travel Tours Ltd, a Nigerian travel agency.

== Political career ==
Saadiya Umar Farouq resigned from the National Assembly Commission to officially join politics as a member of the defunct Congress for Progressive Change (CPC), where she rose to become the national treasurer of the CPC, which dissolved into a new party. Saadiya Umar Farouq became the interim national treasurer of the All Progressives Congress (APC) from 2013 to 2014. She was appointed as a member of the APC's presidential campaign council, where she served as the director of election planning and monitoring, field operations, and fundraising, in preparation for the 2015 general election which Buhari, as the presidential candidate of the APC, won.

== Political appointment ==
On 26 September 2016, Saadiya Umar Farouq was appointed as the Honourable Federal Commissioner of the National Commission for Refugees, Migrants, and Internally Displaced Persons. On August 21, 2019, Saadiya Umar Farouk was appointed as the minister of Humanitarian Affairs, Disaster management, president move the National social investment (N- SIP) to the office of minister of humanitarian affairs, disaster management.

== Major achievement in office ==
Saadiya Umar Farouq has several achievement since the creation of the ministry of humanitarian affairs and disaster management in August 2019, it is on record that at least 20 million Nigerians have so far been empowered through various social investment Programmes and initiatives of the ministry. It is also on record that under the National Home Grown School Feeding Programme, a total of 9.9 million children from primary 1 to 3 in public schools nationwide are currently being feed one hot Nutrition, 126,000 benefiting cooks for in the (NHGSFP). In the area of the youth empowerment and upliftment, the ministry has been able to upskill about 1,664,774 youths in the graduate and nongraduated Programmes under the N-Power scheme. In early July 2022 the Saadiya Umar Farouq flagged of the cash grant for vulnerable group in Oshogbo, Osun State. As Honourable minister she provides Leadership in the development of humanitarian policies and the effective coordination of National and international humanitarian intervention: ensure strategic disaster mitigation, preparedness and response and managed the formulation and implementation of fair focused social inclusion and protection Programmes in Nigeria in line with the ministry. Before her appointment as a minister Saadiya Umar Farouq has a track record as the honourable federal commissioner of the National Commission for Refugees, Migrants, and Internally Displaced Persons (NCRMIDP). She drew up a new strategic roadmap of action to reposition the commission to take the leading role as Nigeria's humanitarian organisation and bring the Commission activities to world standard. The new strategic roadmap of the Commission focused on the total provision of durable solution to person of concern while emphasizing the establishment of standardised procedures for utilizing research, data gathering and planning for resetting, rehabilitating, reintegrating, and readmitting all persons that full within the commission. Her office has been working hand-in-hand with the National Commission for Persons with Disabilities (NCPWD), headed by Mr. James Lalu, to ensure inclusiveness of the more than 30 million disabled people in matters affecting the country and its people. Hence she commissioned the National Disability Electronic Certificate Production Centre located at the Persons With Disability Complex in Abuja.

== Impacted the Humanitarian Affairs Ministry ==
Sadiya Umar Farouq take on some of the stand-out areas of impact the ministry has made under her watch, as it sought to institutionalise the ongoing social investment programme. The ministry working with the North-East Development Commission (NEDC) to coordinating and providing humanitarian relief under Sadiya Umar Farouq 21-bed medical facility, each close to a large IDP camp in Maiduguri using pre-fabrication technology to serve as COVID-19 isolation centres in the North - East. Zero Hunger: in alignment with SDG to achieving zero hunger and eliminating poverty by 2030 the Nation beneficiary has 9,987,415 individuals and 1,997,483 households. Synergy: As minister Hajiya Sadiya viewed collaboration as the name of the game. She promptly built and nurtured an enduring symbiotic and synergistic relationship with several key multilateral and bilateral partners by working with such organizations as the World Food Programme, the World Bank, USAID, the EU and the UN - OCH to implement programmes in her Ministry. Working with migrants and refugees, Sadiya Umar Farouq working in conjunction with the National Commission for Refugees, Migrants, and Internally Displaced Persons (NCRMIDP), National Agency for the Prohibition of Trafficking in Persons (NAPTIP), National Commission for Persons with Disabilities (NCPWD), Sadiya Farouq facilitated the provision targeted social intervention for the vulnerable from the IDPs and Trafficked women and the people living with disabilities. National Home - Grown School Feeding programme Sadiya Umar Farouq was the pioneering school Feeding programme of Nigeria for the benefiting pupils in primary 1 to 3 in the nation's pupils school growing from 8.71 million have been enumerated into school Feeding Data base as at May 31, 2023. A total of over 127,000 and 100,000 Smallholder farmers were engaged in provision of meal's to 54,619 schools nationwide. Tradermoni, Markermoni, and Farmersmoni Sadiya Umar Farouq leadership implemented it's flagship loan product of the Government Enterprise and Empowerment Programme (GEEP) under the NSIP. With N-Power, Sadiya Umar Farouq initiated a series of reforms which helped to streamline the programme, making it more efficient despite the historical issues that plagued the programme. She work hard to clear the backlog of stipend following the migration to new payment platform. She made several trades and skills training programme to empower the beneficiaries. Under N Skills programme. Conditional cash transfer (CCT) was successful under Sadiya Umar Farouq. Transparency during her time at the ministry she set the bar high when it comes to measuring, evaluating and communicating impact.

== Awards and recognition ==
- 2020: National Humanitarian Response to COVID-19 Award.
- 2021: Africa's leading woman in Humanitarian Service Award
- 2021: Award of Excellence from Kano University.
- 2022: Nigeria Excellence Award in Public Service.
- 2022: Merit Award from Yusuf Maitama Sule University.
- 2022: Dususu Gender Minister Award.
- 2023: Daily Trust African Award.
- 2023: Commander of the Order of the Niger by President Muhammadu Buhari
