= National Commission for Persons with Disability (Nigeria) =

Agency overview
- Formed: 2012
- Type: Law enforcement
- Jurisdiction: Federal Government of Nigeria
- Headquarters: Abuja, FCT, Nigeria
- Agency executive: James Lalu, Executive Secretary;
- Parent agency: Federal Ministry of Humanitarian Affairs, Disaster Management and Social Development
- Website: ncpwd.gov.ng/index.html

The National Commission for Persons with Disabilities (NCWD) is an agency in Nigeria. The agency was established in 2020.

The aim of this agency is to prevent discrimination against persons with disabilities, and to make every one of them have equal rights and opportunities like their counterparts with no disabilities.

NCPWD was established in line with the (Prohibition) Act, 2018 bill in preventing discrimination against persons with disabilities and to ensure their inclusiveness in every sector.

Appointed by President Muhammadu Buhari, as the Executive Secretary of the agency, James David Lalu is shouldered with the responsibility of coordination and implementation of policies, programmes and projects on disability and development in the thirty-six states of Nigeria, focusing on the twin-track approach to Disability Inclusive Development, He works with other ministries, agencies, religious leaders and organizations across the country to end discrimination against the 31 million disabled people in the country.As of 2025, various Nigerian NGOs have focused on expanding digital literacy and AI training for the disability community.

Prior to this appointment, Lalu was the Senior Special Assistant to Governor Jonah David Jang of Plateau State on Disability Affairs, a position he maintained between 2007 and 2013. In 2014, he became State Coordinator, Community Based Rehabilitation Program for People with Disabilities.

According to their official website, the functions of the Commission include:

- Advising the government on policies and programs for the inclusion and welfare of persons with disabilities.
- Promoting public awareness on the rights of persons with disabilities and the need for their inclusion in all aspects of society.
- Ensuring that all government programs and services are accessible and inclusive for persons with disabilities.
- Providing support services and assistance to persons with disabilities, including access to education, healthcare, and employment opportunities.
- Conducting research and collecting data on the needs and experiences of persons with disabilities in Nigeria.
- Monitoring and enforcing compliance with the provisions of the Discrimination Against Persons with Disabilities (Prohibition) Act, 2019.
- Collaborating with other government agencies, civil society organizations, and international partners to promote the inclusion and rights of persons with disabilities.
