= National Senior Citizens Centre =

The National Senior Citizen Centre (NSCC) is an agency of Nigeria's Ministry of Humanitarian Affairs, Disaster Management and Social Development.

The president of Nigeria, Muhamadu Buhari approved the establishment of the NSCC in accordance with section 16(2) (d) of the Nigerian 1999 constitution. This Constitution amendment makes it compulsory for all states to provide adequate social services for the elderly in the society and also to improve their quality of living as senior citizens.

Retired air vice-marshal M. A. Muhammad was appointed as the NSCC's board chairman by the president.

Dr Emem Omokaro is the director-general of the NSCC, and she has said in an interview that plans are ongoing to engage the older citizens in the society to contribute to the economic activities in their various communities.

The NSCC's parent ministry is led by minister Sadiya Umar Farouq. At the 7 June 2021 inauguration of the Nigerian Army Resource Centre in Abuja, she said that the National Policy on Ageing had been approved to protect the rights of the elderly.
