= Sultan Ahmed Ismail =

Soil Biologist

Dr Sultan Ahmed Ismail
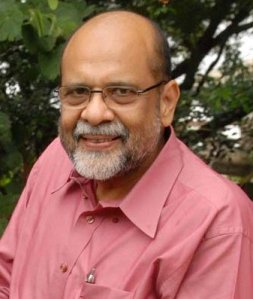
- Born: 9 October 1951 (age 74); Chennai, India
- Education: The New College, Chennai
- Known for: Vermi tech, soil science
- Awards: AringarAnna Award by Government of Tamil Nadu
- Scientific career
- Fields: Biotechnology
- Workplaces: The New College, Chennai

Sultan Ahmed Ismail (born 9 October 1951) is an Indian soil biologist and ecologist. His work has centred on techniques for recycling biodegradable waste into fertilizer using local varieties of earthworms, and on soil bioremediation.

Ismail received a D.Sc. in Zoology from the University of Madras in 2001 for his research on the role of earthworms in soil ecology and waste management. He is also the managing director of the Ecoscience Research Foundation.

Government of Tamil Nadu appointed him as a member of State Development Policy Council on 06.06.2021.

== Vermitech ==
Ismail works with the Department of Science and Technology of the Government of India, in the development of a module on vermicomposting as a sustainable ecological practice for children. He also conducted a project for the Environment and Forests Department of the Government of Tamil Nadu state for implementing vermicomposting in 50 schools in Chennai(Madras), and delivered several lectures to more than 200 schools in India and abroad on environmental awareness, solid waste management and vermicomposting. He is currently working with the Consumer Association of Penang (CAP), in an effort to promote awareness of organic farming, vermitech and waste management to educational institutions and organic farmers of Malaysia.

His other research interests are on the anti-inflammatory properties of earthworms, the ultrastructure of the penial setae of earthworms, and the electrical bioluminescence of earthworms.

== Books ==
- Aspects of Behaviour (Ismail, S.A., and Alawdeen, S.S., ed)., The New College, Chennai, India. 161 pp. 1987.
- Environmental Studies for Class I (Gopalan, R., Sundaram, V., and Ismail, S.A.), Tata McGraw Hill Publishing Company Ltd., India. 60 pp. 1994.
- Environmental Studies for Class II (Gopalan, R., Sundaram, V., and Ismail, S.A.), Tata McGraw Hill Publishing Company Ltd., India. 59 pp. 1994.
- Composting through earthworms (Ismail, S.A., Seshadri, C.V., Jeeji Bai, N., and Suriyakumar, C.R.), M.C.R.C., Chennai, India. 38 pp. 1994.
- Vermitech (vermicompost and vermiwash) (Ismail, S.A.), Ajju's wormery, Chennai, India. 10 pp. 1996.
- Vermitech (mannpuzhu uram mattrum mannpuzhu serivuttapatta neer) In Tamil, (Ismail, S.A.), Ajju's wormery, Chennai, India. 11 pp. 1996.
- Usar sudhar khetu vermiculture tatha vermiwash ka uthpadhan In Hindi. (Ismail, S.A.). Uttar Pradesh Land Development Corporation, Lucknow, India. 07 pp. 1996.
- Vermitech: Worm powered technology (ed Ismail, S.A.), Council for Advancement of People's Action and Rural Technology, New Delhi, India. 40 pp. 1997.
- Vermicology: The Biology of Earthworms, (Ismail, S.A.) Orient Longman. 92pp. 1997.
- Mannpuzhu: Valarppum, Tozhilnutpamum, Payankalum (In Tamil) (Ismail, S.A.) Orient Longman. 115pp. 2001.
- The Organic Farming Reader. (Alvares, C., Shiva, V., Ismail, S.A., Vijayalakshmi, K., Mathen, K., and Declercq, B. editors) ARISE and Other India Press, India. 1999. 298 pp.
- The Earthworm Book, (Ismail, S.A.,), Other India Press, Goa. 2005. 101 pp

== Awards ==
- Arignar Anna Award by the Department of Environment, Government of Tamil Nadu, India for environmental education and awareness 2005
