= North-East Development Commission =

- NEDC

Agency overview
- Formed: 2017
- Headquarters: Maiduguri, Borno State, Nigeria
- Agency executive: Mohammed Goni Alkali, Managing Director
- Parent department: Federal Government of Nigeria
- Website: nedc.gov.ng

The North-East Development Commission (NEDC) is a commission in Nigeria established to rebuild infrastructure and institutions destroyed by Boko Haram in northeast Nigeria. The commission oversees activities in Borno, Adamawa, Bauchi, Taraba, Gombe and Yobe states.

The NED has promoted development in Nigeria by donating bulletproof vests and helmets to the Agro Rangers.
