= National Social Investment Program =

Nigerian social welfare program

The National Social Investment Program of Nigeria is a social welfare initiative launched by the federal government of Nigeria in 2015. The program, overseen by the National Social Investment Office, aims to promote equitable resource distribution to vulnerable populations, such as children, youth, and women. Under President Muhammadu Buhari's administration, four key programs have been implemented to mitigate the effects of poverty and foster economic development.

The N-Power (Nigeria) program offers young Nigerians job training, education, and a monthly stipend of 30,000 Nigerian naira (US$83.33). The Conditional Cash Transfer Program (CCT) provides financial assistance to impoverished individuals to support their basic needs and education.

The Government Enterprise and Empowerment Program (GEEP) is a micro-lending investment program targeting entrepreneurs, with a particular focus on young people and women. These loans are intended to offset some of the startup costs of business ventures in Nigeria.

Lastly, the Home Grown School Feeding Program (HGSF) is an initiative to broaden school enrollment by providing meals to students, especially those in poor and food-insecure regions. The program works with local farms to support the economy and its farmers while preparing affordable meals for scholars.

== Background ==
In June 2016 the World Bank Group approved a $500 million International Development Association credit to support the establishment of programs targeted at economic development in Nigeria. The Nigerian Government provided an additional $1.3 billion from its budget to create the social safety net programs which came to be known as the National Social Investment Program. Since then, over 4 million Nigerians have directly benefited from job training, financial assistance, and social development through these programs.

== N-Power ==
=== About ===
The N-Power Program is built to address the issue of youth unemployment and help increase social development. The Program is designed to target Nigerians between the ages of 18 and 35 "to acquire and develop life-long skills for becoming change-makers in their communities." It is planning to deploy 500,000 trained graduates to Nigeria's public services like education, healthcare, and civic engagement. Nigeria is looking to increase its technology sector by increasing a talent pool of software developers, hardware professionals, and other tech-based skills such as animators and digital artists.

=== Volunteer Corps ===
The N-Power Volunteer Corps is a paid, two-year program for young graduates of tertiary education. Graduates take on responsibilities to address public service shortcomings in their communities to provide teaching, instructional and advisory solutions in four important areas of economic development.

==== Education ====
The N-Power Teach program helps improve basic education in Nigerian communities. Volunteers are deployed as teacher assistants in primary schools where they engage with students to foster relationships and build confidence while supporting their educational development. In addition, these volunteers bring education solutions to underserved communities, helping the most marginalized members of their communities get access to the education they need to participate in the modern workforce. As part of this program, volunteers help implement STEM programs in primary schools with a particular focus on computer science, engineering, applied mathematics, and other tech information knowledge.

==== Health ====
The N-Power Health Program deploys volunteers to provide care with a focus on preventative measures and the most vulnerable, including pregnant women and children. By increasing access to basic health services in underserved communities, the N-Power Health Program serves the double purpose of increasing the overall well-being of millions of citizens and supporting the development of healthcare infrastructure with community-based solutions.

==== Agriculture ====
N-Power Argo is a program designed to provide services to farmers across the country. Part of the focus is to support the development of efficient farming techniques and practices to maximize productivity in the agricultural sector. The other side of the program provides technological and institutional development to farming communities in rural areas, places where the public service sector is particularly underrepresented. By creating a stronger link between rural and urban communities and centralizing the knowledge base while incorporating local knowledge and practices, the N-Power Argo program is built to link the diverse communities of Nigeria while promoting a modern economy.

==== VAIDS ====
The Voluntary Asset and Income Declaration Scheme is the government's attempt to ensure compliance with the nation's tax protocol and asset declaration. Volunteers seek to encourage businesses and individuals to voluntarily declare their correct income and assets and to pay the appropriate taxes to the government. Over 3,700 individual volunteers work with the Federal Ministry of Finance (Nigeria) and the Joint Tax Board as community liaisons, providing services like document review, record keeping, responding to citizen inquiries, and interacting with the community.

== Conditional Cash Transfer Program (CCT) ==
Nigeria's Conditional Cash Transfer program provides targeted cash transfers to the most vulnerable households with the long-term goal of lifting millions out of poverty. A monthly stipend of N5,000 ($13.89) is given to households in poverty-stricken communities along with an additional N5,000 for families designated as priorities or extreme cases. Along with the cash transfers, as part of the program, beneficiaries are supported, mentored, and coached by trained Community Facilitators who visit them weekly to help them take ownership of their lives. Savings groups are formed with the intention of creating communities to share and grow financial knowledge, provide training for employment and life skills, as well as improve nutrition, hygiene, and sanitary conditions. Part of the requirement is that households with school-age children enroll in school to promote education enrollment and incentivize educational attainment. As of 2018, payment was going to over 297,000 beneficiaries supported by 2,495 Community Facilitators.

== Government Enterprise and Empowerment Program (GEEP) ==
The Government Enterprise and Empowerment Program was established to provide financial support and training to businesses and entrepreneurs at the bottom of the financial pyramid. By providing low-cost micro-lending to over a million women, enterprising youths, agricultural workers, and other vulnerable economic producers, the Government Enterprise and Empowerment Program supports the development of otherwise low-productivity sectors of the population, bringing millions of people into the modern economy and lifting communities out of poverty.

A federal grant of N140 billion (US$388,888.88) was invested in the program to reach over a million women, 200,000 artisans and MSMEs, 260,000 youth business ventures, and 200,000 farmers and agricultural workers.

== Home Grown School Feeding Program (HGSF) ==
The Home Grown School Feeding Program was created to provide a nutritious and balanced meal to 5.5 million school children in grades 1 to 3. The Program aims to improve the enrollment of primary school children and reduce the drop-out rate, currently estimated at over 30%. Most of this shortage is due to poverty and this program is built to address the most important basic need of schoolchildren and provide the nutrition needed to engage successfully with their education. By linking the program to local food supply chains, the community is engaged to create a social support beyond simply providing meals to certain children. over 44,000 cooks are engaged in the program, feeding over 4 million students in 26 Nigerian States. The intention is a cycle of productivity, sustaining and connecting local farmers to nationwide and global markets while providing the next generation with the sustenance necessary for education and growth. Local economies are directly stimulated in various sectors, from education to the service industry to the agricultural sector, while educational attainment and acquisition of skills are encouraged and supported among the youth.

== See also ==
- Economy of Nigeria
- Education in Nigeria
- Female education in Nigeria
- Youth in Nigeria
- Glory Emmanuel Ediet
