= List of Presidents of the Nigeria Bar Association =

List of heads of the umbrella association for Nigerian lawyers

The Nigerian Bar Association (NBA) is the non-profit, umbrella professional association for all legal practitioners in Nigeria, including those admitted to the Nigerian Bar. Established in its modern format in 1959, the association's core objectives include the promotion and defense of the human rights, the rule of law, and institutional reforms within the administration of justice in the country.

The head of the association is the president, who serves as its chief executive officer, national representative, and ex-officio member of the National Judicial Council and the Body of Benchers. Following structural and electoral reforms, the president is elected through an electronic voting system by all verified, financially up-to-date members of the association. The president serves a non-renewable, two-year term.

As of July 2026, 33 individuals have served as national leaders of the association. The leadership succession is divided into two broad periods: the early organizational leadership (1959–1991), which saw the stabilization of the bar across regional branches, and the modern era (1991–present), which began with the election of the first female president and the subsequent adoption of universal suffrage and electronic balloting. Between 1992 and 1998, the national body faced a prolonged institutional crisis following the rowdy 1992 Port Harcourt Annual General Conference, during which the national executive was dissolved, leaving regional branches to manage affairs until the association's reconstitution.

== Presidents ==
The tables below follow the chronological succession of the national leaders of the bar. Prior to 1960, the national head was formally designated as the "Chairman."

=== Early leadership (1959–1991) ===
| No. | Portrait | President | Term of office | Primary branch | SAN status | Notes / Major events | Ref. |
|---|---|---|---|---|---|---|---|
| 1 | Placeholder | Alhaji Jibril Martins | 1959–1960 | Lagos | N/A | Served as the inaugural national leader during the formal independence transition period. | |
| 2 | Placeholder | F. R. A. Williams | 1960–1968 | Lagos | Yes (1975) | First formal President post-independence. Appointed among the foundation class of Senior Advocates of Nigeria in 1975. | |
| 3 | Placeholder | Peter Thomas | 1968–1969 | Warri | No | First President drawn from the mid-western region bar. | |
| 4 | Placeholder | G. M. Boyo | 1969–1970 | Warri | No | Contributed to regional bar expansions following the Nigerian Civil War. | |
| 5 | Placeholder | Richard Akinjide | 1970–1973 | Ibadan | Yes (1978) | Later served as the Attorney General of the Federation during the Second Republic. | |
| 6 | Placeholder | Adebayo Ogunsanya | 1973–1974 | Lagos | Yes | Oversaw early statutory amendments to the Legal Practitioners Act. | |
| 7 | Placeholder | Mudiaga Odje | 1974–1976 | Warri | Yes (1978) | Maintained bar independence during early military rule. | |
| 8 | Placeholder | Nwakanma Okoro | 1976–1978 | Enugu | Yes (1978) | Expanded administrative presence into Eastern Nigeria branches. | |
| 9 | Placeholder | B. O. Benson | 1978–1980 | Lagos | Yes | Standardized annual conference frameworks. | |
| 10 | Placeholder | Adetunji Fadairo | 1980–1982 | Abeokuta | Yes | Coordinated policy actions during the civil rule transition. | |
| 11 | Placeholder | A. N. Anyamene | 1982–1984 | Enugu | Yes | Focused on the professional welfare of junior practitioners. | |
| 12 | | Bola Ajibola | 1984–1985 | Abeokuta | Yes | Resigned upon appointment as Minister of Justice; later elected a Judge of the International Court of Justice. | |
| 13 | Placeholder | Ebele Nwokoye | 1985–1987 | Onitsha | No | Navigated critical legal standoffs regarding military tribunals. | |
| 14 | Placeholder | Alao Aka-Bashorun | 1987–1989 | Lagos | No | Renowned for human rights advocacy and robust opposition to military decree overreaches. | |
| 15 | Placeholder | Charles Idehen | 1989–1991 | Benin City | No | Led initiatives for institutional Decentralization. | |

=== Modern era (1991–present) ===
| No. | Portrait | President | Term of office | Primary branch | SAN status | Notes / Major events | Ref. |
|---|---|---|---|---|---|---|---|
| 16 | Placeholder | Clement Akpamgbo | 1991–1992 | Enugu | Yes | Vacated the office upon appointment as Attorney General of the Federation. | |
| 17 | Placeholder | Priscilla Kuye | 1992 | Lagos | No | First female President of the association. Assumed office after Akpamgbo's departure. Her tenure was truncated by the 1992 crisis. | |
National body dissolved due to institutional crisis (1992–1998); operations managed by local branch chairmen.
| 18 | Placeholder | T. J. O. Okpoko | 1998–2000 | Warri | Yes | Led the post-crisis reconciliation and administrative restoration of the national bar structure. | |
| 19 | Placeholder | O. C. J. Okocha | 2000–2002 | Port Harcourt | Yes | Modernized national administrative operational standards. | |
| 20 | Placeholder | Wole Olanipekun | 2002–2004 | Ilorin | Yes (1991) | Advanced strict compliance protocols governing the rule of law. | |
| 21 | Placeholder | Bayo Ojo | 2004–2005 | Kaduna | Yes | Resigned midterm following his appointment as Attorney General of the Federation. | |
| 22 | Placeholder | Lanke Odogiyan | 2005–2006 | Kaduna | No | Filled the unexpired term of Bayo Ojo. | |
| 23 | | Olisa Agbakoba | 2006–2008 | Lagos | Yes (1998) | Pioneered civic coalitions and justice sector reforms. | |
| 24 | | Rotimi Akeredolu | 2008–2010 | Ibadan | Yes (1998) | Later served as the Executive Governor of Ondo State. | |
| 25 | Placeholder | Joseph Daudu | 2010–2012 | Kaduna | Yes (1995) | Focused on corporate governance structures within the bar. | |
| 26 | Placeholder | Okey Wali | 2012–2014 | Port Harcourt | Yes | Expanded the infrastructural assets of the national bar secretariat. | |
| 27 | Placeholder | Augustine Alegeh | 2014–2016 | Benin City | Yes (2007) | Conceptualized and executed the comprehensive digitalization of NBA national voting systems. | |
| 28 | Placeholder | Abubakar Balarabe Mahmoud | 2016–2018 | Kano | Yes (2001) | Campaigned on structural accountability under the "#BraveNewBar" framework. | |
| 29 | Placeholder | Paul Usoro | 2018–2020 | Uyo | Yes (2003) | Oversaw electronic bar verification and financial transparency tracking. | |
| 30 | Placeholder | Olumide Akpata | 2020–2022 | Lagos | No | First president in 3 decades elected from the outer bar (non-SAN class), drawing immense support from junior lawyers. | |
| 31 | Placeholder | Yakubu Chonoko Maikyau | 2022–2024 | Kebbi | Yes (2011) | Strengthened continuous professional legal education platforms. | |
| 32 | Placeholder | Afam Osigwe | 2024–2026 | Abuja | Yes (2023) | Focused on expanding pro-bono representations and institutional rule of law protections. | |
| 33 | Placeholder | Oyinkansola Badejo-Okusanya | 2026–present | Lagos | Yes (2025) | Second female President in NBA history and the first woman elected to the position in 35 years. | |

== See also ==
- Judiciary of Nigeria
- Body of Benchers
- Senior Advocate of Nigeria
- Nigerian Law School
