= List of senior advocates of Nigeria =

This is a list of notable senior advocates of Nigeria (SAN), arranged in alphabetical order.Since 1975, a varying number of advocates in Nigeria have consecutively been conferred with the rank, with the exception of 1976, 1977 and 1994. The conferment is however restricted to fewer than 30 advocates per annum and is made by the chief justice of Nigeria on the recommendations of the Legal Practitioners’ Privileges Committee.[7] In 2023, Kayode Ajulo, a renowned lawyer and rights activist heralded other 57 lawyers to be conferred with the prestigious title. In 2024, Mofesomo Tayo-Oyetibo was conferred with the rank of SAN at 34 years of age. Also, in the year 2025, 57 lawyers were conferred with the rank including Abdulakeem Labi-Lawal.

As of May 2022, a total of 693 lawyers have been awarded the title since its inception in 1975. [8]

== A ==
- Abiodun Layonu, Attorney General of Ondo State, Activist and Scholar
- Amari Omaka Chukwu, law professor and Commissioner in Ebonyi state
- Eyimofe Atake Senior Advocate of Nigeria
- Abubakar Malami, former Minister of Justice and Attorney General of the Federal Republic of Nigeria
- Solomon Adun Asemota is a Nigerian lawyer.

Abdulakeem Labi-Lawal, notable litigation lawyer practising in Lagos State.

== B ==
- Bayo Ojo, former Attorney General of the Federal Republic of Nigeria.
- Babatunde Raji Fashola, former Executive Governor of Lagos State
- Bola Ajibola, former Attorney General of the Federal Republic of Nigeria.
- Bolaji Owasanoye, Chairman of the Independent Corrupt Practices and other Related Offences Commission, ICPC

== C ==
- Chimezie Ikeazor was a Nigerian lawyer

== D ==
- Damilola Sunday Olawuyi, Professor of Law and Deputy Vice Chancellor, Afe Babalola University, Ado Ekiti

== E ==
- Ernest Ojukwu, Professor of Law, former Deputy Director-General and Head Nigerian Law School
- Eyitayo Jegede, Former Attorney General and Commissioner for Justice Ondo State

== F ==
- Femi Falana, political activist.
- Folake Solanke
- Frederick Rotimi Williams (16 December 1920 – 26 March 2005) was a Nigerian lawyer.
- Fabian Ajogwu is a Nigerian lawyer and a senior partner at Kenna Partners
- Festus Keyamo (21 January 1970) became Nigeria's Minister of State for Niger Delta Affairs on 21 August 2019.
- Folashade Alli, a Nigerian and UK-qualified lawyer and Chartered Arbitrator.

== G ==
- Gani Fawehinmi (22 April 1938 – 5 September 2009) was a Nigerian author, publisher and human right activist

== H ==
- Henry Odein Ajumogobia (born 29 June 1956) was a former Nigerian minister of Foreign Affairs.
- Chief Henry Theodore Okeade Coker (1929-2015)

== I ==
- Isa Hayatu Chiroma

== J ==
- Kanu Godwin Agabi, Nigerian lawyer and politician who was a National Senator Attorney-General of the Federation
- Joash Amupitan, Nigerian lawyer and professor of law who serves as the Chairman of the Independent National Electoral Commission.

== K ==
• Kabiru Tanimu Turaki, Nigerian Lawyer and Politician. The first Senior Advocate of Nigeria from Kebbi State and former Minister of Special Duties and Intergovernmental Affairs, Former Supervising Minister, Federal Ministry of Labour and Productivity having served from 2013- 2015 and 2014 - 2015.

== L ==
- Lateef Olufemi Okunnu (born 19 February 1933, Lagos State, Nigeria) is a Nigerian Lawyer
- Larry Selekeowei (born 25 September 1965, Bayelsa State, Nigeria) is a Nigerian barrister, solicitor and notary public
- Ladosu Ladapo was a Nigerian jurist and a former Western State Commissioner for Economic Planning and Reconstruction.

== M ==
- Muiz Banire, Chairman, Asset Management Corporation of Nigeria and formal National Legal Adviser [APC]
- Mike Ozekhome, Constitutional lawyer and human rights activist
- Olisa Agbakoba (Born 29 May 1953) is a Nigerian lawyer.
- Obafemi Awolowo GCFR, (6 March 1909 – 9 May 1987) was a lawyer, educational administrator, publisher and politician
- Oluwarotimi Odunayo Akeredolu, former President of the Nigerian Bar Association
- Okey Wali, the 26th President of the Nigerian Bar Association.
- Ogundiran Aladi born (19 August, 1984).
- Chimaroke Chukwuemeka
- Mofesomo Tayo-Oyetibo

== P ==
- Paul Usoro (7 September 1958) is a Nigerian litigator and 29th President of the Nigerian Bar Association

== R ==
- Richard Akinjide, lawyer and human right activist.
- Rotimi Akeredolu, former President Nigeria Bar Association and Governor of Ondo state.

== S ==
- Idowu Sofola SAN, MON (29 September 1934) is a Nigerian Jurist, Bencher and former President of the Nigerian Bar Association. He was formerly the Chairman of the Nigerian Body of Benchers.
- Kayode Sofola is a Nigerian jurist and former Chairman of United Bank for Africa.
- Sylvester E. Elema (SAN) (July 2017) is a Nigerian jurist, highly experienced with over 35 years of practice and skilled in broad areas of legal practice ranging from documentation, conveyancing through to litigation and commercial practice.
- Sunusi Musa SAN, is a Nigerian lawyer, human rights advocate, and political strategist. He currently serves as the Chairman of the Institute for Peace and Conflict Resolution (IPCR Nigeria), a federal agency under Nigeria’s Ministry of Foreign Affairs. Musa is known for his legal advocacy, political engagement, and contributions to peacebuilding and governance in Nigeria.

== V ==
- Victor Ndoma-Egba, a Nigerian politician and member of the national senate.

== W ==
- Wole Olanipekun, a constitutional lawyer.
- Wale Babalaki, Former Pro-chancellor and Head of Governing council of the renowned University of Lagos.

== Y ==
- Yusuf Olaolu Ali is a Nigerian lawyer.
- Yemi Osinbajo, SAN is a Nigeria professor of Law, former Solicitor General and Attorney-General of Lagos State, Nigeria, former vice president of Nigeria under President Buhari (29 May 2015 - 29 May 2023)
- Yemi Akinseye George, SAN (Born, 1963 Ekiti State, Nigeria) is a Nigeria professor of Public law and President of the Center for Socio-Legal Studies
