= List of Nigerian jurists =

There are several Legal practitioners across the six geopolitical zones of Nigeria.

This is a list of notable jurists in Nigeria, arranged in alphabetical order.

== A ==
- FOM Atake
- Aloma Mariam Mukhtar
- Ayotunde Phillips
- Ade Ipaye

Abdulmumin A Oba Abdulwahab Egbe Wole

== B ==
- Bamidele Aturu

== D ==
- Dahiru Musdapher
- Damilola Sunday Olawuyi
- Danladi Umar

== F ==
- Festus Keyamo
- Folagbade Olateru Olagbegi
- Francis Albert Shodolamu Ogunmuyiwa

== I ==
- Idowu Sofola

== J ==
- Joseph Bodurin Daudu
- John Taylor
- Joseph Adefarasin

== K ==
- Kayode Ajulo
- Kehinde Sofola
- Kumai Bayang Akaahs

== L ==
- Lateef Olufemi Okunnu

== M ==
Muhammad Tawfik

== O ==
- Olukayode Ajulo
- Okey Wali
- Oluwafunmilayo Olajumoke Atilade
- Olaoluwa Abagun
- Olumide Akpata

== P ==
- Paul Usoro

== S ==
Samuel Ikpeme

== W ==
- Wole Olanipekun

== Y ==
- Yemi Osinbajo
- Yemi Akinseye George

Yusuf Olaolu Ali

Yunus Ustaz Usman
