= Attorney General of Nigeria =

The Attorney General of Nigeria also known as the Attorney General of the Federation is the chief legal adviser to the President of Nigeria and Government of Nigeria. The attorney general is a member of the Federal Executive Council, the National Security Council, and the Council of State. The office is a dual-role portfolio with the role of Minister of Justice, serves as the cabinet minister responsible for the Federal Ministry of Justice. The Attorney General is appointed by the President, and is assisted by a Permanent Secretary, who is a career civil servant. As of August 2023, the Attorney General is Lateef Fagbemi.

== List of Attorney Generals ==
The following is a list of prior Attorney Generals of Nigeria:

- Teslim Elias (1960–1966)
- G.I.M Onyiuke (1 March 1966 – 29 July 1966)
- Nabo Graham-Douglas (1966–1972)
- Dan Onuorah Ibekwe (1972–1975)
- Augustine Nnamani (1975-1979)
- Richard Akinjide (1979–1983)
- Kehinde Sofola (October 1983- December 1983)
- Chike Ofodile (1984–August 1985)
- Bola Ajibola (12 September 1985–4 December 1991)
- Clement Adegoke (1991–1993)
- Olu Onagoruwa (1993–1994)
- Michael Ashikodi Agbamuche (1994–1997)
- Achiji Abdullahi Ibrahim, OFR (1997–May 1999)
- Kanu Godwin Agabi (June 1999–January 2000)
- Bola Ige (3 January 2000–23 December 2001)
- Kanu Godwin Agabi (2002–2003)
- Akin Olujimi (July 2003–July 2005)
- Bayo Ojo (July 2005–July 2007)
- Michael Aondoakaa (26 July 2007–10 February 2010)
- Adetokunbo Kayode (10 February 2010–17 March 2010)
- Mohammed Bello Adoke (6 April 2010– 29 May 2011)
- Mohammed Bello Adoke (2 July 2011– May 2015)
- Abubakar Malami (11 November 2015–29 May 2023)
- Lateef Fagbemi (21 August 2023-present)

== See also ==
- Minister of Justice and Attorney General of Canada
