= New Cruse 92.7 FM =

- Ikere-Ekiti, Ekiti State; Nigeria
- Frequency: 92.7 MHz

Ownership
- Owner: Wole Olanipekun

History
- First air date: April 14, 2020

Links
- Website: newcrusefm927.com

New Cruse 92.7 FM is a privately owned Nigerian radio station located in located in Ikere Ekiti, Ekiti State.

The station is owned by Chief Wole Olanipekun (SAN), former president of the Nigerian Bar Association (NBA). Broadcasts began in March 2020, with full programming on April 14 of that year.
