= Mohammed Bello Adoke =

Nigerian lawyer (born 1963)

Mohammed Bello Adoke SAN, CFR, FCIArb, DSSRS

Attorney General of Nigeria
- In office April 2010 – May 2015
- Preceded by: Adetokunbo Kayode
- Succeeded by: Abubakar Malami

Personal details
- Born: 1 September 1963 (age 63) Jos, Plateau State, Nigeria
- Spouse: Married
- Education: Ahmadu Bello University; Nigerian Law School; University of Nottingham; University of Oxford; University of Leiden; Robert Kennedy College
- Occupation: Lawyer, Arbitrator
- Known for: Attorney General of Nigeria
- Awards: Commander of the Order of the Federal Republic (CFR)

Mohammed Bello Adoke CFR (born 1 September 1963) is a Nigerian legal practitioner, arbitrator, and former Attorney General of the Federation and Minister of Justice of Nigeria.

== Early life and education ==
Adoke was born in Jos, Plateau State, Nigeria, and hails from Adavi Local Government Area in Kogi State. He attended Township School, Moscow Road, Port Harcourt, and later completed his secondary education at Government Secondary School, Omu-Aran, Kwara State, where he obtained the West African School Certificate.

He proceeded to the Institute of Administration, Ahmadu Bello University, Zaria, where he earned a Diploma in Law (Upper Credit) from 1980 to 1982. He continued at the same university to obtain a Bachelor of Laws (LL.B Hons) degree with Second Class Upper Division between 1982 and 1985. After attending the Nigerian Law School, Lagos, he was called to the Nigerian Bar in 1986.

Adoke pursued further studies internationally, obtaining a Postgraduate Diploma in International Tax Law from Robert Kennedy University, Switzerland (1999), and a Postgraduate Diploma in International Commercial Law from the University of Nottingham, England (2001–2002). He earned a Postgraduate Diploma in International Commercial Arbitration from Keble College, University of Oxford (2009), and an Advanced Master of Laws (LL.M) in Public International Law with specialization in International Criminal Law from Leiden University, The Hague (2016).

== Career ==
=== Legal practice ===
Adoke began his legal career as a Pupil State Counsel at the Kano State Ministry of Justice (1986–1987) and subsequently worked at law firms including Zakari Yaro & Co., and I.M. Boyi & Co., in Kano. In 1991, he established M.A. Bello & Co., a law firm specializing in corporate insolvency, arbitration, alternative dispute resolution, taxation, and investment law.

He also served in various corporate legal advisory capacities, including as legal adviser to Voix System, London (2003–2010), Afri-Projects Consortium Limited (1997–1999), and Kabo Holdings Limited (1995–1999).

=== Public service ===
In April 2010, Adoke was appointed Attorney General of Nigeria and Minister of Justice of Nigeria, a position he held until May 2015 under President Goodluck Jonathan's administration. During his tenure, he played significant roles in domestic and international legal affairs and represented Nigeria at various high-profile events, including sessions of the United Nations Human Rights Council, the Assembly of State Parties to the Rome Statute, and the Cameroon-Nigeria Mixed Commission on the Bakassi Peninsula dispute.

He served as a member of Nigeria's Federal Executive Council, the National Security Council, the National Defence Council, the National Council of State, and the Federal Judicial Service Commission between 2010 and 2015. He was also a member of the International Law Commission (ILC) of the United Nations from 2011 to 2017 and was elected President of the Asian-African Legal Consultative Organization (AALCO) between 2012 and 2013.

Adoke chaired several strategic committees, including the Committee on Prerogative of Mercy and the White Paper Drafting Committee on the Restructuring and Rationalization of Federal Government Parastatals, Commissions, and Agencies.

=== Professional associations ===
Adoke has been actively involved in the Nigerian Bar Association (NBA), serving as Chairman of the NBA Kano Branch, Chairman of the NBA National Bar Centre Committee, and Chairman of the Judges' Forum of the NBA Section on Legal Practice.

He is a Fellow of the Chartered Institute of Arbitrators, United Kingdom, and has been a member of various professional bodies, including:

- Nigerian Bar Association (NBA)
- International Bar Association (IBA), London
- Nigerian Chambers of Commerce Dispute Resolution Centre
- Member of the International Law Commission (ILC), 2011–2017
- Institute of Medical and Health Law (Fellow Honoris Causa)
- Chartered Institute of Corporate Administration and Industrialists, Nigeria
- Institute of Business Executives, Nigeria

== Malabu Oil deal controversy ==
On 28 December 2015 Adoke was invited by the Economic and Financial Crimes Commission (EFCC) for questioning over the Malabu Oil deal. He was questioned in connection to the missing £22.5m (N6.18billion) loot of the Sani Abacha which was recovered from Island of Jersey. A threeman team madeup of Federal government officials which including Adoke was set up to monitor and recover the funds. In March 2016 it was reported that Adoke's home in Netherlands was searched as well as the Royal Dutch Shell headquarters due an investigation into the missing funds and receiving bribe from the Malabu Oil deal.

On 21 December 2016, the Economic and Financial Crimes Commission officially filed charges against Adoke on a nine count charge that as at when he was the attorney general of Nigeria he approved a transfer transaction of $1.1 billion to Nigerian bank accounts managed by Dan Etete former minister of petroleum. The $1.1billion was paid by Royal Dutch Shell and Eni to the Federal government account for OPL 245 oil bloc.

On 17 April 2019, a Nigerian High Court in Abuja issued an arrest warrant for Adoke and four others for failing to appear at trial in connection with Malabu Oil deal.

== Malabu Oil deal acquittal ==
On 28 March 2024, Justice Abubakar Kutigi of the Federal Capital Territory High Court dismissed all charges of fraud, bribery, and conspiracy against Adoke, ruling that the EFCC failed to establish a prima facie case. The court noted that the EFCC did not provide sufficient evidence to prove the allegations, including the claim that Adoke received a ₦300 million bribe from Aliyu Abubakar, a property developer. The judge also highlighted that the EFCC's assertion of illegal tax waivers granted to Shell and Eni was not corroborated by the Federal Inland Revenue Service or any other authority.

Further, on 19 April 2024, Justice Inyang Ekwo of the Federal High Court in Abuja upheld Adoke's "no case" submission in a separate money laundering case, discharging and acquitting him of all charges. The EFCC had alleged that Adoke laundered ₦300 million, but the court found that the EFCC failed to provide any evidence to substantiate the claim.

Earlier, the US Department of Justice also closed the case based on the facts available to it. The US Securities and Exchange Commission also did the same. Italian and English courts have also ruled that there was no case of corruption, acquitting, Shell, Eni, and JP Morgan.

Adoke welcomed the judgments, stating that he had been unjustly defamed and that the acquittals vindicated his position that he acted lawfully and in the national interest during his tenure as attorney-general.

== Honours and awards ==
Adoke has received numerous honours, including:

- Senior Advocate of Nigeria (SAN)
- Commander of the Order of the Federal Republic (CFR)
- Fellow of the Chartered Institute of Arbitrators (FCIArb)
- Appointment as a notary public by the chief justice of Nigeria

== Works ==
- Burden of Service: Reminiscences of Nigeria's Former attorney general (2019)

== Personal life ==
He is married to Sa’adatu Mohammed Bello, a lawyer and former attorney-general of Taraba State, and they have six children.
