= Chike Ofodile =

Nigerian Minister of Justice and International Court of Justice judge

Onowu Chike Ofodile SAN, OFR

Minister of Justice of Nigeria
- In office 1984 – August 1985
- Preceded by: Kehinde Sofola
- Succeeded by: Bola Ajibola

Personal details
- Born: 20 November 1921 Onitsha, Nigeria
- Died: 3 August 2014 (aged 92)
- Education: North-Western Polytechnic

Chike Francis Ofodile, OFR (20 November 1921 – 3 August 2014) was Attorney General and the Minister of Justice of Nigeria from 1985 to 1991 and a Judge of the International Court of Justice from 1984 to 1985. He was once the traditional Prime Minister of Onitsha.

== Early life and education ==
Onowu Chike Ofodile was born on 20 November 1921, in Onitsha, Anambra State. For his primary school education, he attended Immanuel Church Infant School, St. Mary’s Primary School in Onitsha. His secondary school education was at Christ the King College (CKC), also in Onitsha. After his graduation from CKC, he worked as a teacher at the Holy Trinity School, Onitsha in 1941. In 1954 proceeded to Balham and Tooting College, London and North-Western Polytechnic, London. He attended the Inns of Court School of Law in 1959. He was called to the bar at the Middle Temple, London, also in 1959. He attended the Nigerian Law School and was called to the Nigerian Bar in 1960.

== Career ==
He started his legal career in 1959 in the chambers of his cousin and worked there till 1964. In 1964, he went into private practice. In 1979, he was made a Senior Advocate of Nigeria as well as a life bencher. He left private practice in 1983 and became a member of the defunct Supreme Military Council. In 1984, General Muhammadu Buhari, then military president of Nigeria appointed him as the Attorney-General of the Federation and Minister of Justice. He left office in August 1985.

== Awards and recognitions ==
In 2008, President Umaru Musa Yar'Adua conferred on him the National Honour, Officer of the Order of the Federal Republic (OFR).
