= Olu Onagoruwa =

11th Minister for Justice and Attorney-General of the Federation of Nigeria

Olu Onagoruwa GCON SAN

11th Minister for Justice and Attorney-General of the Federation
- In office 1994–1995
- President: Sani Abacha
- Preceded by: Clement Akpamgbo
- Succeeded by: Michael Ashikodi Agbamuche

Personal details
- Born: 11 November 1936 Odogbolu, (present day Ogun State), Nigeria
- Died: 21 July 2017 (aged 80) Federal Medical Centre, Ebute Metta, Lagos, Nigeria
- Party: nonpartisan
- Education: University of London
- Profession: Lawyer

Gabriel Olusoga Onagoruwa, GCON SAN (1936—2017) popularly known as Olu Onagoruwa was a Nigerian jurist and human rights activist who served as Minister for Justice and Attorney-General of the Federation from 1994 to 1995 during the military junta of Sani Abacha.

== Early life and education ==
Onagoruwa was born in Odogbolu in Ogun State. He studied law at the University of London, where he graduated with an LL.B in 1964. He further obtained an LL.M and a Ph.D. in Constitutional Law from the same university in 1968. He attended the Nigerian Law School and was called to bar in 1971.

== Career ==
Onagoruwa was a member of the Inner Temple and was called to the Nigerian bar in 1971. In 1994, he was appointed as the Attorney-General of the Federation by Sani Abacha—the then Head of State—a position he resigned from in 1995 after Turner Ogboru (the brother of Great Ogboru), whom he ordered for his release was re-arrested for conspiracy.
