= Oyinkansola Badejo-Okusanya =

33rd President of the Nigerian Bar Association

33rd President of the Nigerian Bar Association
- Incumbent
- Assumed office 21 August 2026
- Preceded by: Afam Osigwe

Personal details
- Born: Oyinkansola Badejo-Okusanya; 15 January 1967 (age 59)
- Citizenship: Nigerian
- Spouse: Yomi Badejo-Okusanya
- Children: 1
- Education: University of Lagos (BA, LL.B.); Queen Mary University of London (LL.M.)
- Occupation: Lawyer, arbitrator

Oyinkansola Badejo-Okusanya, SAN, FCIArb (born 15 January 1967) is a Nigerian lawyer, arbitrator, and public policy professional who serves as the 33rd President of the Nigerian Bar Association (NBA). She was elected to the position in July 2026, becoming the first woman to win the office through an election and the second woman to lead the association in its history, following Dame Priscilla Kuye's tenure from 1991 to 1992.

Badejo-Okusanya is a founding partner at Africa Law Practice NG & Company (ALP NG & Co.), where she co-heads the Litigation and Dispute Resolution Practice.

== Early life and education ==
Oyinkansola Badejo-Okusanya (née Olumide) was born on 15 January 1967. She is the eldest child of Olufolabi Olumide and Clara Folasade Abiodun Olumide (née Solarin), a university administrator who became the first female Registrar of the University of Lagos (UNILAG). She was raised on the UNILAG campus in Akoka, Lagos.

She attended the University of Lagos, where she first earned a Bachelor of Arts (Hons) degree in English before completing her Bachelor of Laws (LL.B.) degree. Following her graduation, she attended the Nigerian Law School and was called to the Nigerian Bar in 2002. She subsequently obtained a Master of Laws (LL.M.) in Commercial and Corporate Law from Queen Mary University of London.

== Legal career ==
Badejo-Okusanya began her legal career in commercial dispute resolution at the law firm Olaniwun Ajayi LP. In 2017, she became a founding partner of Africa Law Practice NG & Company (ALP NG & Co.), an Africa-focused commercial law firm, where she assumed leadership as Co-Head of the Litigation and Dispute Resolution Practice. Her practice encompasses litigation, commercial arbitration, mediation, and regulatory compliance.

On 29 September 2025, she became a Senior Advocate of Nigeria.

== Public service ==
In 2007, Badejo-Okusanya entered public service upon her appointment as the Senior Special Assistant on Justice Sector Reform to the Governor of Lagos State, Babatunde Fashola. Serving within the office of the Attorney-General and Commissioner for Justice, Olasupo Shasore, SAN, she participated in the formulation and coordination of justice sector administrative reforms within Lagos State.

== Arbitration and professional leadership ==
Badejo-Okusanya is a Fellow of the Chartered Institute of Arbitrators (UK) and an accredited mediator with the Centre for Effective Dispute Resolution (CEDR). She served on the executive committee of the Chartered Institute of Arbitrators (UK) Nigeria Branch and chaired its Annual Conference Planning Committee for three terms across Lagos (2014), Abuja (2015), and Port Harcourt (2016).

Within the local bar structures, she has held multiple positions, including Assistant Secretary of the NBA Lagos Branch, Chairperson of the NBA Lagos Branch Annual Dinner Committee, and a member of both the NBA Lagos Branch Building Committee and the Technical Committee on Conference Planning.

== Presidency of the Nigerian Bar Association ==
In July 2026, Badejo-Okusanya contested the national presidency of the Nigerian Bar Association. In the electronic election held from 18 July to 19 July 2026, she polled 12,317 votes (47.18% of the total valid ballots cast) to defeat fellow Senior Advocates of Nigeria, Lateef Omoyemi Akangbe, who received 7,934 votes (30.39%) and Aare Olumuyiwa Akinboro, who received 5,855 votes (22.43%).

The election recorded a 31.86% voter turnout of 82,172 registered voters. While the defeated candidates raised initial objections regarding technical difficulties and operational irregularities during the digital voting process, outgoing NBA President Afam Osigwe, SAN, appealed for organizational unity. Badejo-Okusanya's campaign team subsequently issued a statement committing to inclusive leadership.

She is scheduled to succeed Afam Osigwe during the NBA Annual General Conference in Port Harcourt, Rivers State, from 21 August to 28 August 2026.

== Professional memberships ==
- Senior Advocate of Nigeria (SAN)
- Fellow, Chartered Institute of Arbitrators (UK) (FCIArb)
- Member, Nigerian Bar Association (NBA)
- Accredited Mediator, Centre for Effective Dispute Resolution (CEDR)

== Personal life ==
Badejo-Okusanya is married to Yomi Badejo-Okusanya, a Nigerian public relations professional, with whom she has a son. She serves as a chorister and church steward at Emmanuel Chapel, a congregation of the Methodist Church Nigeria located in Ikoyi, Lagos.
