= Augustine Nnamani =

Nigerian supreme judge

Justice Supreme Court of Nigeria
- In office 1979–1990
- Nominated by: Olusegun Obasanjo

Attorney General of Nigeria
- In office 1976–1979
- Preceded by: Daniel Ibekwe
- Succeeded by: Richard Akinjide

Personal details
- Born: 7 August 1934 Agbani, Enugu state
- Died: 1990
- Party: Non partisian

Augustine Nnamani was a former justice of the Supreme Court of Nigeria, he was appointed on 15 August 1979, and was on the court for 11 years. Prior to the appointment, he was Attorney General of the Nigerian Minister of Justice.
