= Olumide Akpata =

Nigerian lawyer

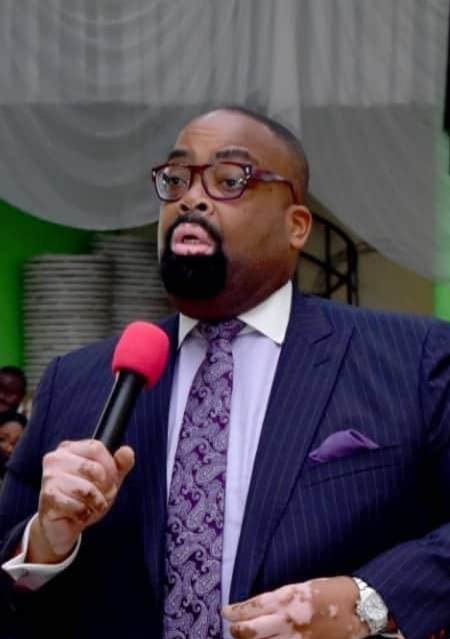

President of the Nigerian Bar Association
- In office 28 August 2020 – 19 July 2022
- Preceded by: Paul Usoro
- Succeeded by: Yakubu Maikyau

Personal details
- Born: 7 October 1972 (age 53) Edo State, Nigeria
- Party: Labour Party (Nigeria)

Olumide Osaigbovo Akpata (born 7 October 1972, from Edo South Senatorial district, Edo State) is a Nigerian legal practitioner and politician. He was a senior partner and the head of the Corporate and Commercial Practice Group at Templars law firm in Nigeria until his resignation on 31 August 2023 to enable him to pursue partisan politics. In September 2023, he hosted the program "KingsWeek 2023" with the Old Boys Association, King's College, Lagos. He became the first non-Senior Advocate of Nigeria in 28 years to be elected president of the Nigerian Bar Association in July 2020.

== Early life ==
Akpata was born on 7 October 1972, in Berlin, Germany. He began his education at Nana Primary School in Warri, then moved on to Federal Government College, Warri and later King's College in Lagos. He obtained a bachelor's degree in law from University of Benin, Edo State in 1992 and was called to the bar in 1993. He served in the National Youth Service Corps in Kano State.

== Career ==
Akpata began his legal practice in Delta State under the tutelage of Mudiaga Odje.

In 1996, Akpata relocated to Lagos and teamed up with his cousin, Oghogho Akpata, who had just set up the law firm Templars the previous year.

Akpata is currently senior partner and head of the Corporate & Commercial Practice Group of Templars. He was chairman of the Nigeria Bar Association Section on Business Law (NBA-SBL).

On 30 July 2020, he was elected as the president of the Nigerian Bar Association after winning the election against Babatunde Ajibade and Dele Adesina.

He was the Labour Party's governorship candidate in the Edo 2024 election.

== See also ==
- List of Nigerian jurists
