= Danladi Umar =

Nigerian judge

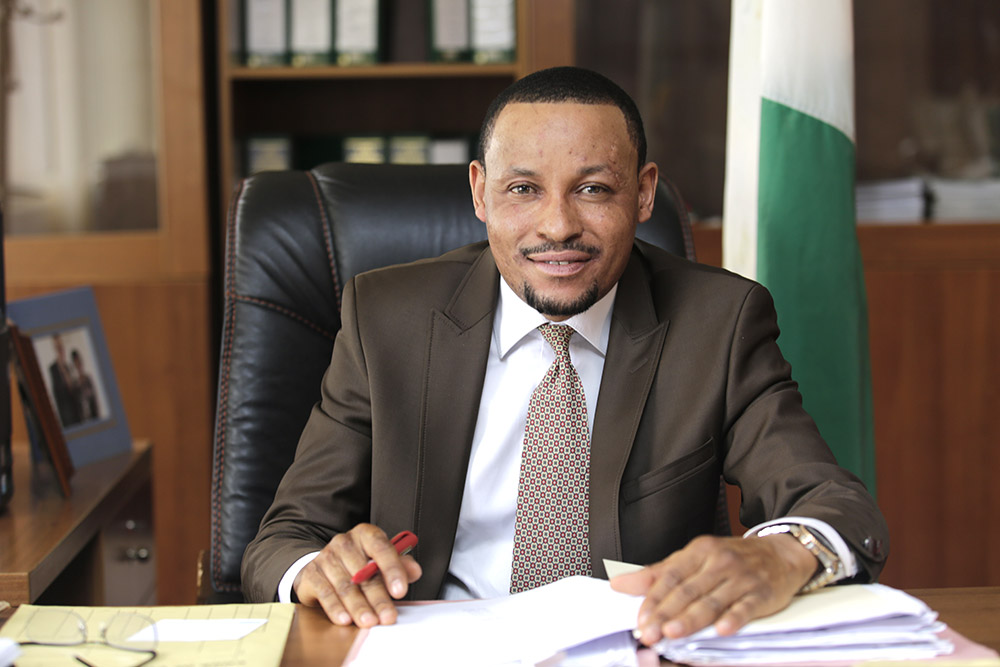
- Justice Danladi Umar
- Born: 19 August 1971 (age 55); Bauchi, Nigeria
- Citizenship: Nigeria
- Education: University of Maiduguri
- Known for: Human Rights-activism

Danladi Umar (born 19 August 1971 in Bauchi, Nigeria) is a Nigerian jurist from Bauchi State in northeastern Nigeria. Prior to becoming Chairman of the Code Of Conduct Tribunal (CCT) of Nigeria, he was a lawyer and a Chief Magistrate in Bauchi State, Nigeria. Appointed at age 36 to the CCT as acting chairman, Danladi Umar went on to become the youngest chairman of the CCT four years later.

The National Judicial Council (Nigeria) as well as Federal Judicial Service Commission recommended him to President Goodluck Jonathan, who then appointed him to the position of the CCT .

== Early life and education ==
Danladi Yakubu Umar was born in Bauchi on 19 August 1971. He is a Fulani by tribe. He studied law from the University of Maiduguri. He was called to the bar in 1992.

== Career ==
After completing his studies, he started private practice in the chambers of Ayinde Sani and Co, Ibrahim Umar and Co and Kanu Agabi and Associates. He later joined the Federal Civil Service as Senior Legal Officer, Nigerian Federal Ministry of Justice. He also held appointment as Assistant Legal Adviser in the Federal Capital Territory and Culture and Tourism.

=== Chairman Of The Code Of Conduct Tribunal ===
At the age of 36, Danladi Umar was sworn in as an acting chairman of the Code Of Conduct Tribunal ("CCT"), the adjudication unit of the Code of Conduct Bureau established under the Law of Nigeria. On July 11, 2011, he was appointed as the Chairman of the CCT, replacing his predecessor Justice Murtala Adebayo Sanni who died on January 24, 2011. He is the youngest person (age 40 years) to ever hold the office of chairman of the CCT. He was sworn in by the chief justice of Nigeria (CJN) and chairman of the National Judicial Council (NJC), Justice Aloysius A. I. Katsina-Alu at the Supreme Court alongside two other new tribunal members, retired Justice Robert Isaac Ewa Odu and Barrister Atedze William Agwaza, making up the three members of the CCT tribunal.

=== Trial of the Senate President of Nigeria ===
On September 18, 2015, Danladi Umar made legal history in Nigeria by becoming the first judge in the country to issue an arrest warrant against a sitting senate president of Nigeria, Bukola Saraki. His action against the third citizen of the country was unprecedented.

=== Arraignment of 6 Ex-Governors ===
On November 16, 2015, Danladi Umar had issued warrants for the arraignment of six former governors for falsifying their properties and personal wealth in their assets declaration forms, an action that is punishable under Nigerian laws.

== Assassination attempt ==
A deadly armed ambush by heavily armed assassins targeted Danladi Umar on Friday 28 June 2013. On his way to Bauchi for an official assignment, Umar's convoy was attacked by armed gunmen on the Keffi-Gitata Road in Nasarawa State. Ibraheem Al-Hassan, the Head of Press and Public Relations of the tribunal, stated that the security personnel guarding Danladi Umar engaged the gunmen in a fierce firefight, killing one of the assassins and wounding several others, who escaped. Ibraheem suspected corrupt politicians were behind the assassination attempt, accusing some implicated politicians "whose cases are pending before the judges to be mischievous, especially as the 2015 elections draw nearer."

== Personal life ==
Danladi Umar comes from Toro local government area of Bauchi state and is married with children.

== Controversy ==
=== Assault on guard ===
On March 29, 2021 Umar allegedly assaulted a security guard at a plaza. According to reports the Chairman of the Code of Conduct Tribunal arrived a shopping plaza to repair his phone, on arrival there was disagreement between him and the security guard over parking space before he supposedly assaulted the guard. According to publication by Premium Times Umar was caught on camera "slapping and kicking" the guard. The Nigerian Bar Association has called for his resignation.

== See also ==
- List of Nigerian jurists
