= Olanrewaju Onadeko =

Nigeria law administrator

Director General of Nigerian Law School
- In office July 2013 – December 2018
- Preceded by: Prof Tahir Mamman
- Succeeded by: Prof Isa Chiroma

Personal details
- Born: 14 April 1953 (age 73) Oshogbo, Ogun State
- Education: Obafemi Awolowo University; Nigerian Law School; University of London School of Economics and Political Science
- Occupation: legal practitioner, lecturer, administrator

Olanrewaju Adesola Onadeko (born 14 April 1953) is a legal practitioner, lecturer and administrator. He served as the Director General of the Nigerian Law School from 2013 to 2018. He is a member of Bar Association of Nigeria and the Council of Legal Education, and was succeeded by Isa Hayatu Chiroma as the DG of the NLS. He was conferred to Senior Advocate of Nigeria in 2016. He is currently a professor of law at the Ajayi Crowter University.

== Education ==
Olanrewaju began his education at the I.C.C Practicing School Ibadan in 1959 to 1964 and went to attends The Ebenezer African Church School Ibadan in 1964 to 1965. From 1966 to 1972 he went to Government College Ibadan, then he in 1973 he attended the Obafemi Awolowo University and graduated with a Bachelor of Laws in 1976 and also graduated from the Nigerian Law School in 1977, he also attended the University of London School of Economics and Political Science in 1982 to obtains his Master of Laws in 1983.

== Career ==
He began his career at the Ministry of Justice of state council in Cross River in 1977 and was called to Bar, in 1978 to 1981 he was acting senior counsel grade I and II at the State Counsel Ministry of Justice in Abeokuta and became senior lecturer in the Nigeria Law School in 1982 to 1989.

He became the director of Public Prosecution at the Ministry of Justice of Gambia and judge advocate of Gambia National Army, Courts Marshal in 1989 to 1994 when he was deputy director and head of department of Litigation in Nigerian Law School till 1998, in 2000 he was the director Bookshop House Limited and CSSLimited and in 2001 to 2004 he was the secretary Council of Legal Education and administration director of the Nigerian Law School and was the deputy director and head of Nigeria Law School in Lagos campus in 2005 to 2013, he also a member of Nigerian Association of Law Teacher.

In 1981 he was the States consultant of Lagos state appeal vs Saliu, Opeyemi and Sikiru in 1987, also 2000 he was the States consultant of Lagos for Mayaiki, he was successful in prosecution of the celebrated USAID Fraud Case of the State vs Binta Sidibeh, criminal libel case of Sanna Maneh and the Appeals over twenty treason cases determined in favour of the state by the Court of Appeal Gambia. In 2004, he was consultant to Lagos State Government for many cases, such includes the Maj Gen. Ishaya Bamaiyi and Hamza Al-Mustapha vs the state, still in 2004 in counsel, vs Council of Legal Education and Anon vs Mohammed Uwal Taminu, council of legal education vs Taofile Oladipo Elias, Malachi Elisha Brown vs the Council of Legal Education chairman Dr. O. Orojo with six others.

He had authored several books one amongst them is the; Nigerian Criminal Trial Procedure. Lanre was the first chairman of editorial Board of the Nigeria Law and practical journal from 1997 to 2001.
