= Olugbemisola Odusote =

Nigerian legal practitioner and academic administrator

Olugbemisola Titilayo Odusote
- Born: 1969 (age 56–57)
- Education: Obafemi Awolowo University; University of Surrey
- Occupations: Legal educator, academic administrator
- Known for: First female Director‑General of the Nigerian Law School
- Office: Director‑General of the Nigerian Law School

Olugbemisola Titilayo Odusote (born 1969) is a Nigerian legal practitioner and academic administrator. She is the Director‑General of the Nigerian Law School, having assumed office on 10 January 2026. She is the first woman to lead the institution since its establishment in 1962.

== Early life and education ==
Odusote earned her Bachelor of Laws (LL.B) degree from Obafemi Awolowo University and was called to the Nigerian Bar in 1988. She also holds a Master of Laws (LL.M) degree from the same university, specialising in company and commercial law. She later obtained a Doctor of Philosophy (Ph.D.) in Law from the University of Surrey in the United Kingdom, where her research focused on public law and the administration of justice.

== Career ==
=== Academic and administrative roles ===
Odusote began her professional career at the Nigerian Law School when she joined as a lecturer in 2001. Over the years, she served in several leadership roles including Head of the Academic Department, Director of Academics, and Head of Campus. Prior to her current appointment, she was the Deputy Director‑General and Head of the Lagos Campus. She has published in reputable local and international law journals and has presented papers at numerous legal education conferences. She also served on committees of the Council of Legal Education and the Nigerian Bar Association.

=== Director‑General of the Nigerian Law School ===
In January 2026, President Bola Ahmed Tinubu approved Odusote’s appointment as Director‑General of the Nigerian Law School, effective 10 January 2026, for a four‑year term. She succeeded Professor Isa Hayatu Chiroma, whose tenure ended on 9 January 2026. As Director‑General, Odusote is responsible for the academic leadership, administrative management, and strategic direction of the Law School across all of its campuses. She also serves as the principal liaison between the Law School and key legal bodies including the Council of Legal Education, the Body of Benchers, and the Nigerian Bar Association.
