= Joseph Bodurin Daudu =

Nigerian jurist

President of the Nigerian Bar Association
- In office August 2010 – July 2012

Personal details
- Born: 27 December 1959 Kogi State, Nigeria
- Party: Non-partisian

Chief Joseph Bodurin Daudu, SAN, (born December 27, 1959) is a prominent Nigerian Jurist, Bencher and former President of the Nigerian Bar Association.

== Early life ==
Daudu was born on December 27, 1959, at Ogori-Magongo local government area of Kogi State, north-central Nigeria.

He obtained a bachelor's degree in law from the Ahmadu Bello University in Zaria in 1979 and was called to the bar in 1980. He attained the rank of Senior Advocate of Nigeria in 1995.

== Career ==
He began his law career in 1980, the same year he was called to the bar. In August 2010, he was elected as President of the Nigerian Bar Association, a position he held until he was succeeded by Okey Wali in July 2012.

He was a member of the Nigerian Body of Benchers for 8 years (2002–2010) and became a Life Bencher in 2010, the same year he was elected, president of the NBA. He is an honourable member of the International Council of Jurists, where he served as secretary-general.

== See also ==
- List of Nigerian jurists
