= Asemota =

- Language: Edo

Origin
- Region of origin: West Africa

Other names
- Variant forms: O’osemwonta, Osemwonta, Asemwota

Asemota is an Edo surname. It is said that the first person to bear Asemota was in the 17th century Benin, Edo. Asemota is a kings bloodline and people who bear Asemota today can trace their ancestry to ancient kings of the great Edo State, Nigeria. Notable people with the surname include:

- Dahlton Ogieva Asemota ,

Senator of the first republic, Nigeria

- Eghosa Asemota Agbonifo, Nigerian politician
- Helen Asemota, Jamaican based biochemist and agricultural biotechnologist
- Leo Asemota, Nigerian artist
- Reality Asemota, Nigerian footballer
- Solomon Adun Asemota, Nigerian lawyer
