= Michael Aondoakaa =

Nigerian politician

Michael Kaase Aôndoakaa, SAN

Minister of Justice of Nigeria
- In office 26 July 2007 – 10 February 2010
- Preceded by: Bayo Ojo
- Succeeded by: Adetokunbo Kayode

Personal details
- Born: 12 June 1962 (age 64) Benue State, Nigeria

Michael Kaase Aôndoakaa, SAN (born 12 June 1962) is Nigeria's former Justice Minister and Attorney General of the Federation in office from July 2007 to 10 February 2010.

== Background ==
Michael Kaase Aôndoakaa was born in Benue on 12 June 1962 to the royal family of His Royal Highness, Late Chief Abraham Aôndoakaa Ugbudu Pahar of Mbashabu, Mbakuha Ukan in Ushongo Local Government Area of Benue State. He went to school at Mount Saint Gabriel's Secondary School, Makurdi and upon graduation was admitted into the Faculty of Law, University of Maiduguri where he obtained his LL.B Certificate. He became a senior partner of a law firm for 18 years.

While helping two of his friends, Ogiri Ajene, former deputy governor of Benue State and Professor Daniel Saror to secure nomination for ministerial appointment, he was invited to meet President Umaru Musa Yar'Adua, and during the interview was offered the post of Attorney General of the Federation and Minister of Justice until 10 February 2010 when he was removed in controversial circumstances by the Acting President Goodluck Jonathan.

== Attorney general ==
He was appointed Minister of Justice on 26 July 2007. He was a member of a sub-committee to review the report of Justice Mohammed Uwais committee on electoral reform. The sub-committee assisted in producing a white paper which sparked controversy because it reversed some recommendations of the Uwais committee. It recommended that the President continue to appoint the chairman of Independent National Electoral Commission (INEC), among other changes.

He opposed sacking Maurice Iwu, chairman of INEC, despite criticism of Iwu's conduct of the 2007 elections. He objected to the dissolution of local governments in Ondo State by Olusegun Mimiko, the new governor, although a High Court in Ondo supported the action.

The United States diplomatic cables leak turned out that the drug company Pfizer had hired private investigators to find evidence against Aondoakaa to pressure him into dropping charges against the company over claims that a new antibiotic had caused harm to children. In 2010, he was stripped of the rank of Senior Advocate of Nigeria by the Legal Practitioners Disciplinary Committee on the strength of several petitions written against him for actions taken while in Office as Attorney General of the Federation. The rank has since been restored to him.

Upon leaving office, Aondoakaa became a rice farmer and his company remains one of the biggest local producers and processors of rice in Nigeria.
