= Yakubu Maikyau =

Nigerian legal practitioner (born 1965)

Yakubu Chonoko Maikyau

Past President of the Nigerian Bar Association
- In office 22 August 2022 – 29 August 2024
- Preceded by: Olumide Akpata
- Succeeded by: Mazi Afam Josiah Osigwe, SAN

Personal details
- Born: 6 February 1965 (age 61) Kebbi State, Nigeria

Yakubu Chonoko Maikyau (born 6 February 1965) is a Nigerian lawyer, Senior Advocate of Nigeria and founder of Y. C. Maikyau & Co. He served as president of the Nigerian Bar Association from 22 August 2022 to 29 August 2024.

== Early life ==
Maikyau was born on 6 February 1965, at Kebbi State of Nigeria. He obtained a bachelor's degree in law from Ahmadu Bello University, Kaduna State in 1989 and was called to the bar on 12 December 1990.

== Career ==
On 18 July 2022, he was elected as the president of the Nigerian Bar Association after acquiring a total of 22,342 votes, defeating his closest rival Joe-Kyari Gadzama (SAN) who polled 10,842 votes, and Jonathan Taidi (SAN) who polled 1,380 votes.

== See also ==
- List of Nigerian jurists
