= Kanu Godwin Agabi =

Nigerian lawyer and politician

Kanu Godwin Agabi CON, SAN

Minister of Justice
- In office June 1999 – January 2000
- Preceded by: Abdullahi Ibrahim
- Succeeded by: Bola Ige
- In office 2002–2003
- Preceded by: Bola Ige
- Succeeded by: Bayo Ojo

Minister of Solid Minerals Development
- In office January 2000 – 2002
- Preceded by: Musa Gwadabe

Personal details
- Born: 1946 (age 79–80) British Nigeria

Kanu Godwin Agabi CON SAN is a Nigerian lawyer and politician who was a senator, and was twice attorney general and minister of justice of the federation during the presidency of Olusegun Obasanjo.

Agabi was appointed a senior advocate of Nigeria on 15 September 1997. In the April 1999 elections, he ran for governor of Cross River State, but was defeated by Donald Duke. He was said to be a candidate for the same position in the 2003 elections.

== Minister of justice ==
In March 2002, Agabi wrote in a letter to Nigerian state governors that the application of strict Islamic or Sharia law was unconstitutional, since some judgments passed under Sharia discriminated against Muslims. That month, Amina Lawal, a young Nigerian woman accused of giving birth to a child out of wedlock, was sentenced to death by stoning, a punishment that was confirmed in August 2002 by a Shari'ah court of appeals in Funtua, Katsina State. Agabi came under pressure from Amnesty International to abolish the death penalty in Nigeria.

In May 2003, the attorney general urged a Federal High Court in Abuja to order the arrest of the National Assembly leadership, and to imprison them for contempt of the court. He appealed to the court to set aside the anti-graft bill which the National Assembly had passed into law despite a presidential veto.

== Later career ==
In June 2007, Agabi represented the Independent National Electoral Commission (INEC) in a suit filed by General Muhammadu Buhari, the presidential candidate of the All Nigeria Peoples Party (ANPP), seeking to jail INEC Chairman Professor Maurice Iwu for refusing to allow Buhari's lawyers access to electoral materials.

In May 2009, Agabi was counsel for the Chairman of the Senate Committee on Power, Nicholas Ugbane, who had been charged by the Economic and Financial Crimes Commission (EFCC) of complicity in defrauding the government of about N5.2 billion earmarked for rural electrification.
