= Kayode Sofola =

- Born: OGUN State, Nigeria
- Citizenship: Nigerian
- Occupations: jurist; solicitor; activist
- Years active: July 1976 – present
- Parent: Kehinde Sofola (father)
- Relatives: Idowu Sofola (uncle)

Kayode Sofola, SAN, is a Nigerian jurist and former chairman of United Bank for Africa.

== Education and career ==
Kayode obtained a bachelor's degree in law from University of Birmingham in 1974 and master's degree in law from the University of London in 1976. In 1996, he attained the rank of Senior Advocate of Nigeria and in 2004, he became the chairman of the United Bank for Africa, a position he held until 2007. He is currently a member of the board of directors of United Courier Limited. He was the chairman of the five-man Tax Appeal Tribunal that ordered ExxonMobil to pay the sum of 83.4 million dollars (13.09 bn) education tax to the Federal Inland Revenue Service (FIRS).

== Personal life ==
He is the eldest son of Kehinde Sofola, a prominent Nigerian Jurist and Minister of Justice during the Second Nigerian Republic.

== See also ==
- Idowu Sofola
- List of Nigerian jurists
