= Kumai Bayang Akaahs =

Nigerian jurist

Justice of the Supreme Court of Nigeria
- In office September 2012 – 12 December 2019

Personal details
- Born: 12 December 1949 (age 76) Kaduna State, Nigeria
- Party: Non-partisan

Kumai Bayang Akaahs, OFR (born 12 December 1949) is a Nigerian jurist and former Justice of the Supreme Court of Nigeria.

== Early life ==
Kumai was born on December 12, 1949, at Kaura, a local government area in Kaduna State, Northern Nigeria. He attended St. Mary's Secondary School in Kaduna, where he obtained the West Africa School Certificate. He received a bachelor's degree in Law from Ahmadu Bello University in September 1973 before he proceeded to the Nigerian Law School and was called to the bar in 1975.

== Law career ==
He began his career in 1975, at the Kaduna State Ministry of Justice as State Counsel and rose to the position of a Principal State Counsel in January 1980. On May 6, 1986, he was appointed as Judge of Kaduna State Judiciary. On November 21, 1998, he was appointed to the bench of the Nigerian courts of appeal and in September 2012, he was appointed to the bench of the Supreme Court of Nigeria as Justice. He presided over the ruling of the Supreme Court that affirmed Willie Obiano as the governor elect of Anambra State in the November 16, 17 and 30 governorship election.

== Membership ==
- Member, Nigerian Bar Association
- Member, International Bar Association
- Member, Nigerian Body of Benchers
