= Ministry of Foreign Affairs (Nigeria) =

Nigerian statutory body

Ministry of Foreign Affairs of the Federal Republic of Nigeria
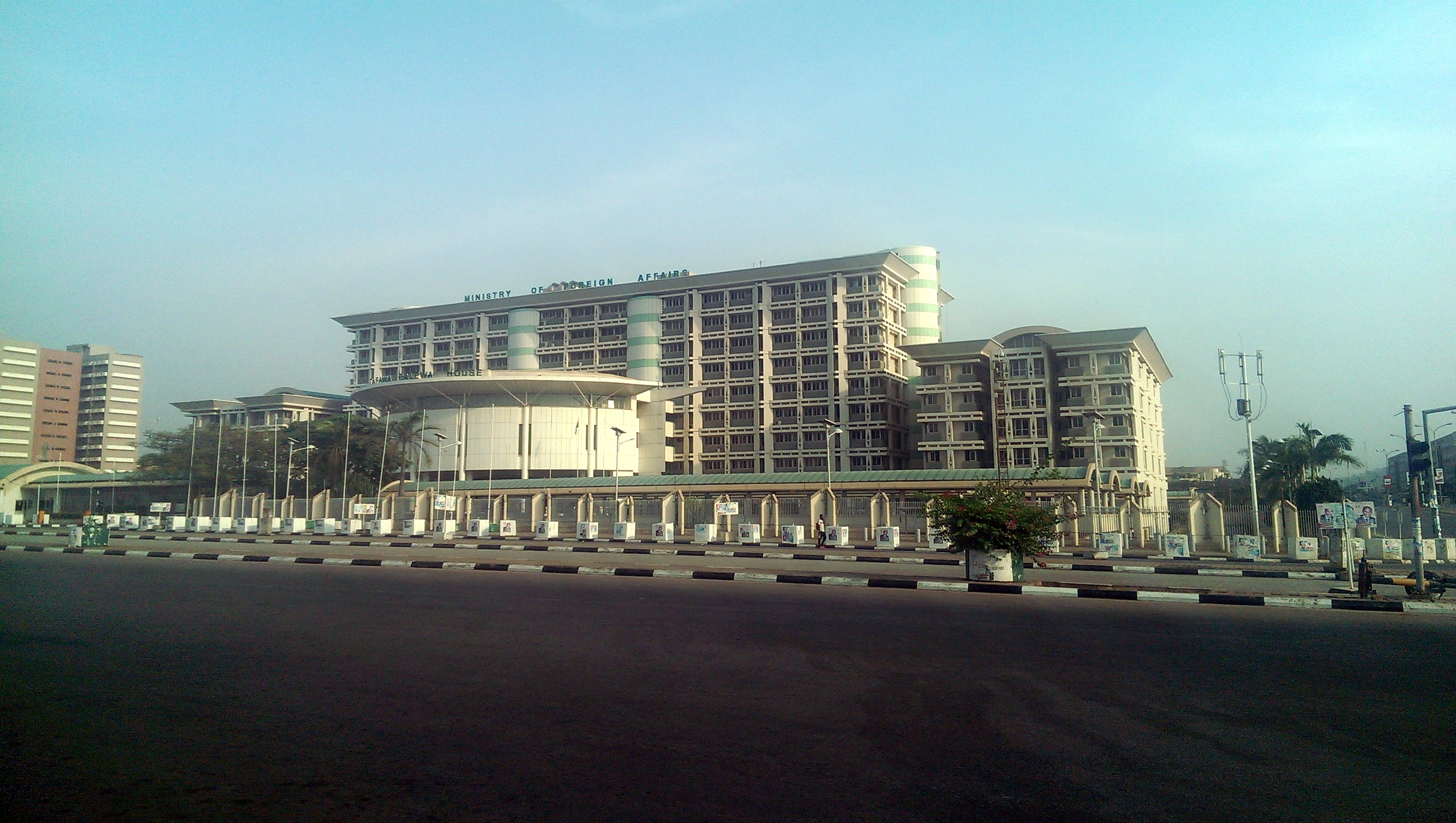
- Headquarters of the ministry

Agency overview
- Formed: September 1957; 69 years ago
- Type: Cabinet-level executive department
- Jurisdiction: Government of Nigeria
- Headquarters: Tafawa Balewa House, Central Business District, Abuja
- Minister responsible: Bianca Odumegwu-Ojukwu, Minister of Foreign Affairs
- Deputy Minister responsible: Sola Enikanolaye, Minister of State
- Agency executive: Umar Dunoma Ahmed, Permanent Secretary
- Parent agency: Federal Executive Council
- Child agency: Diplomatic missions of Nigeria; Nigerian Foreign Service Academy
- Website: foreignaffairs.gov.ng

The Ministry of Foreign Affairs of Nigeria is a statutory body created to reinforce foreign decision making and implementation processes in Nigeria and handle the external promotion of Nigeria's domestic vision and ideals; it is headed by a federal executive cabinet minister. As of late its mission has geared towards increasing awareness about Nigeria's economic potential. It is part of the government's executive branch.

== History ==
The ministry was created in 1961, with Prime Minister Tafawa Balewa appointing Jaja Wachuku the inaugural Minister of Foreign Affairs and Commonwealth Relations. Before Wachuku's tenure, Balewa had doubled as Foreign Affairs advocate of Nigeria, from 1960 to 1961.

== Structure ==
=== Departments ===
- Protocol
- Planning Research and Statistics
- Foreign Service Inspectorate

=== Parastatals ===
- Directorate of Technical Co-operation in Africa
- Institute For Peace and Conflict Resolution
- Nigerian Foreign Service Academy
- Nigerians in Diaspora Commission
- Nigerian Institute of International Affairs
- Nigerian Technical Aid Corps
