= Offornze Amucheazi =

Nigerian professor of Law

Professor Offornze Dike Amucheazi
- Born: Anambra State
- Citizenship: Nigeria
- Education: University of Nigeria Nsukka Enugu State, Nnamdi Azikiwe University Awka
- Occupations: Lawyer, Land Attorney, politician
- Organization: Ministry of Lands Anambra State
- Political party: APGA
- Website: https://amucheazi-oziokoco.com/teams/prof-offornze-d-amucheazi-san/

Offornze Dike AmucheaziLiaten, SAN, FCIArb is a Nigerian professor of Law and a Senior Advocate of Nigeria. He is the current Commissioner of Lands and Urban and Regional planning, Anambra State.

== Early life and education ==
Amucheazi's exact personal details are not in the public space as of now because he maintains a low public profile regarding his family and career.

But he was born in Anambra State, South-east Nigeria in the mid-1960s (based on his academic timeline). He got his primary and secondary education in Anambra State as well.

For his University education, he proceeded to the University of Nigeria Nsukka (UNN) for a degree in law, graduating with an LL.B (Hons) in 1990. He was then called to the Nigerian Bar as a Barrister and Solicitor of the Supreme Court of Nigeria in 1991. His advanced studies and professional development include certificates in Strategic Leadership Management from the University of Oxford and Constitution Building in Africa from Central European University, Budapest.

== Career ==
=== Academic career ===
Amucheazi is a storehouse of degrees and qualifications. Bachelor of Laws (LL.B), University of Nigeria (1990), Nigerian Law School (B.L). (1991), Master of Laws (LL.M), University of Nigeria (1995), Doctor of Philosophy (Ph.D.), Nnamdi Azikiwe University, Awka (2004), Certificate in Strategic Leadership Management from Oxford University, United Kingdom.(2014), Certificate on Constitution-Building in Africa from Central European University Budapest, Hungary. (2017)

Post graduation, he has served in the Faculty of Law, Nnamdi Azikiwe University Awka, serving in different departments like the former HOD, Department of Commercial and Property Law, former HOD, department of Public and Private Law. He is also recognized for his mentorship and commitment to education, notably instituting the "Prof. Elo Amucheazi’s Prize for the Best Graduating Student in the Department of Political Science" at UNIZIK in 2018, valued at N50,000 annually for an initial 10-year period (with plans for extension and increased funding).

=== Professional career ===
He is a legal practitioner with over thirty years of experience. He is the Founding Partner of the law firm Amucheazi, Ozioko and Co., with offices in Abuja and Enugu. His practice emphasizes commercial law, property disputes, Alternative Dispute Resolution (ADR), and constitutional matters.

== Politics ==
In public service, Amucheazi was nominated and confirmed as Commissioner for Lands in April 2022. In this role, he oversees land administration, surveying, and property development, committing to optimal service delivery.

== Awards and fellowships ==
- Member of the Lagos Court of Arbitration (LCA)
- Member, Panel of Neutrals of the Edo State and the Enugu State Multi-Door Court Houses
- Fellow of the Chartered Institute of Arbitrators Nigeria (FCArb)
- Fellow of the Institute of Chartered Mediators and Conciliators, (FICMC)
- Fellow of the Institute of Construction Industry Arbitrators (FICIARB)
- Senior Advocate of Nigeria
