= Abdullahi Ibrahim =

Nigerian politician (1939–2021)

Nigerian Federal Minister of Justice
- In office 1997 – May 1999
- Preceded by: Michael Ashikodi Agbamuche
- Succeeded by: Kanu Godwin Agabi

Personal details
- Born: 14 January 1939
- Died: 24 January 2021 (aged 82)

Abdullahi Ibrahim (14 January 1939 – 24 January 2021) was a Nigerian lawyer, politician and administrator. He served as Federal Minister of Justice.

== Biography ==
Ibrahim was called to the English Bar in 1963, and was called to the Nigerian Bar in 1964. He served as Legal Adviser and Senior State Counsel in the defunct Northern Region of Nigeria. He entered private practice in 1973 as Managing Partner of Abdullahi Ibrahim and company. Ibrahim was Legal Adviser and later Chairman of New Nigeria Development Company Limited, (NNDC). In 1982 he was admitted to the Inner Bar as a Senior Advocate of Nigeria, thus becoming the first individual from Northern Nigeria. He was Chairman of the Body of Benchers until 2001. He was a Notary Public, a Fellow of the Chartered Institute of Arbitrators, a member of the Permanent Court of Arbitration at the Hague and Chairman of the Nigerian Bar Association Legal Practitioners Disciplinary Committee.

Ibrahim held cabinet positions as Federal Minister of Education, Science and Technology. He was Minister for Transport and Aviation (1984–1985) in the cabinet of General Muhammadu Buhari.

He was Attorney General of the Federation and Minister of Justice of Nigeria (1997 – May 1999) in the cabinet of General Abdulsalami Abubakar.

He was a Commissioner of the International - National Boundary Commission, and was a member of the Nigerian team that negotiated the Maritime Boundary Treaty between Nigeria and the Republic of Equatorial Guinea and the Unitization Agreement of the Zafiro/Ekanga Oil Fields. He was the agent and later co-agent in the dispute between the Federal Republic of Nigeria and the Republic of Cameroon at the International Court of Justice at The Hague.

Ibrahim died on Sunday 24 January 2021, from COVID-19 during the COVID-19 pandemic in Nigeria.
