= Sunusi Musa =

Nigerian lawyer (born 1978)

SAN Sunusi Musa

Chairman of the Institute for Peace and Conflict Resolution Nigeria
- Incumbent
- Assumed office July 2025
- Director General: Dr Joseph Ochogwu

Personal details
- Born: 1978 (age 47–48) Kano, Nigeria
- Spouse: 1
- Parent: Malam Musa
- Education: Bayero University Kano; University of Maiduguri; University of Benin
- Occupation: Lawyer; Politician; Human rights defender
- Website: https://ipcr.gov.ng/

Sunusi Musa, SAN (born 1978), is a Nigerian lawyer, human rights advocate, and political strategist. He currently serves as the Chairman of the Institute for Peace and Conflict Resolution (IPCR), a federal agency under Nigeria’s Ministry of Foreign Affairs. Musa is known for his legal advocacy, political engagement, and contributions to peacebuilding and governance in Nigeria.

== Early life and education ==
Musa was born in Kano State, Nigeria. He attended Government Secondary School, Gwale (1992–1994), and later Kano State College of Arts and Science, graduating in 1997. He earned a Diploma in Law from Kano State Polytechnic in 2000.

He proceeded to Bayero University, Kano, where he obtained a Bachelor of Laws (LL.B.) in 2005. After completing the Nigerian Law School, he was called to the Bar in 2006. Musa also holds a Postgraduate Diploma in Education from the University of Maiduguri (2009) and a Master’s degree in Legislative Drafting from the University of Benin (2016).

== Legal career ==
Musa is the co-founder of Aliyu & Musa Legal Practitioners and Consultants, a law firm that has handled high-profile litigation in Nigerian courts and regional tribunals. He has led legal teams in over 25 trial court cases, eight Court of Appeal matters, and seven cases before the Supreme Court of Nigeria.

He gained national recognition for his role in securing judgments against the Nigerian government in the 2013 Apo Six case, representing victims of extrajudicial killings before the ECOWAS Court and the High Court of the Federal Capital Territory.

In 2022, Musa was conferred with the prestigious rank of Senior Advocate of Nigeria (SAN) by the Legal Practitioners’ Privileges Committee (LPPC).

== Political Involvement ==
Musa has been active in Nigerian politics, particularly within the All Progressives Congress (APC). In 2018, he led the Nigeria Consolidation Ambassadors Network (NCAN), which raised ₦50 million to purchase the APC presidential nomination form for then-President Muhammadu Buhari.

He has served as legal counsel in several election petition tribunals, including representing the APC and its candidate, Dr. Nasir Yusuf Gawuna, in the 2023 Kano State governorship election tribunal, and also Governor Uba Sani of Kaduna State in the 2023 gubernatorial election petition, where the tribunal upheld the APC’s victory.

== Public Service ==
In July 2025, Musa was appointed Chairman of the Institute for Peace and Conflict Resolution (IPCR). Under his leadership, the Institute has expanded its research and intervention programs, including the relaunch of the Strategic Conflict Assessment (SCA) of Nigeria.

== Personal life ==
Musa resides in Abuja and Kano. He is married and has children.

== See also ==
- Senior Advocate of Nigeria
- List of senior advocates of Nigeria
- Institute for Peace and Conflict Resolution Nigeria
