= Lateef Fagbemi =

Nigerian lawyer and politician (born 1959)

Chief Lateef Fagbemi SAN

Minister of Justice and Attorney General of the Federation
- Incumbent
- Assumed office 21 August 2023
- President: Bola Tinubu
- Preceded by: Abubakar Malami

Personal details
- Born: 16 July 1959 (age 67) Ijagbo, Oyun, Northern Region, British Nigeria (now in Kwara State, Nigeria)
- Party: All Progressives Congress
- Education: University of Jos (LL.B.); Obafemi Awolowo University (LL.M.)
- Occupation: Politician; lawyer
- Cabinet: Cabinet of Bola Tinubu

Chief Lateef Olasunkanmi Fagbemi SAN (born 16 July 1959), is a Nigerian lawyer and politician who is the current Minister of Justice and Attorney General of the Federation since 21 August 2023.

== Life ==
Lateef Olasunkanmi Fagbemi was born on 16 July 1959 in present-day Ijagbo, Oyun Local Government Area of Kwara State. He acquired his Bachelor of Laws degree (LL.B.) from the University of Jos in 1984. He was called to the Nigerian Bar in 1985 and acquired his Master of Laws degree (LL.M.) from the Obafemi Awolowo University in 1987. He became a Senior Advocate of Nigeria in 1998.

On 16 August 2023, he was appointed Minister of Justice and Attorney General of the Federation by President Bola Tinubu.

== Life Blessing ==
Lateef Fagbemi in company of President Bola Ahmed Tinubu entered the Holy Ka'aba along side other delegation on the 2 November 2026.
