= Yemi Akinseye George =

Nigerian lawmaker

- Born: 1963 (age 62–63); Ondo, Nigeria
- Education: University of Lagos
- Occupations: Legal practitioner; academic administrator
- Employer(s): Yemi Akinseye-George & Partners
- Known for: Legal cases

Yemi Akinseye George , SAN (born 1963) is a Nigerian professor of public law and president of the Center for Socio-Legal Studies. He is the principal partner of Yemi Akinseye-George & Partners, a firm which provides qualitative legal and consultancy services to individuals, corporate bodies, and governments within and outside Nigeria.

== Early life ==
George was born on 1963 in Ondo State, Nigeria. He obtained a Bachelor of Law (LLB) in 1985 and a Master of Law (LLM) from the University of Lagos. He was called to the Nigerian Bar as a Barrister and Solicitor of the Supreme Court of Nigeria in 1986. After he completed his National Youth Service Corps in 1986, he proceeded to the University of Lagos where he obtained a master's degree in public law.

== Career ==
In 1989, he joined the University of Ibadan, where he became a senior lecturer. After eight years of academic service at the University of Ibadan, he received a fellowship at the Davis Centre at Princeton University. He conducted research on corruption and constitutionalism in Africa at Princeton (1997-1998). In 2003, he was appointed Special Adviser to the Ministers of Justice and Attorneys-General of the Federal Republic of Nigeria. While serving in this capacity, he was appointed as a professor of public law at Adekunle Ajasin University in Ondo State in December 2004. He served as dean of the faculty of law at the university. In July 2012, he became a Senior Advocate of Nigeria, alongside Femi Falana and 22 others. He has, since his call to bar actively combined scholarship with Legal practice.

== Membership ==
He is a member of the following professional bodies:

- Member of the Nigerian Bar Association
- Member of the Law professors Network, University of Pittsburgh
- Member of the International Society for the Reform of Criminal Law
- Member of the Nigerian Society of International Law
- Member of the Network of University Legal Aid Institutions
- Senior Advocate of Nigeria
- Member of the Council of Legal Education in Nigeria
- Board member Legal Defence and Assistance Project

== See also ==
- List of Senior Advocates of Nigeria
