= Bola Ajibola =

Nigerian jurist (1934–2023)

Prince Bola Ajibola SAN, KBE, CFR

Minister of Justice and Attorney General of Nigeria
- In office 13 September 1985 – 4 December 1991
- President: Ibrahim Babangida
- Preceded by: Chike Ofodile
- Succeeded by: Clement Akpamgbo

Judge of the International Court of Justice
- In office 1991–1994
- Preceded by: Taslim Elias
- Succeeded by: Abdul Koroma

President of the Nigerian Bar Association
- In office 1984–1985
- Preceded by: A.N. Anyamene
- Succeeded by: Ebele Nwokoye

High Commissioner of Nigeria to the United Kingdom
- In office 1999–2002
- President: Olusegun Obasanjo

Personal details
- Born: Bolasodun Adesumbo Ajibola; 22 March 1934 Lagos Island, Lagos Colony, Southern Region, British Nigeria (now in Ogun State, Nigeria)
- Died: 8 April 2023 (aged 89) Lagos, Lagos State, Nigeria
- Resting place: Abeokuta, Ogun State, Nigeria
- Spouse(s): Olufunmilayo Janet Abeni Ajibola; Amatullah Olaitan Ajibola
- Education: University of London
- Occupation: Jurist

Prince Bolasodun Adesumbo "Bola" Ajibola, SAN, KBE, CFR (22 March 1934 – 8 April 2023) was a Nigerian jurist, who was the Attorney General and Minister of Justice of Nigeria from 1985 to 1991 and a judge of the International Court of Justice from 1991 to 1994. He was president of the Nigerian Bar Association from 1984 to 1985. He was also one of five commissioners on the Eritrea-Ethiopia Boundary Commission, organized through the Permanent Court of Arbitration. In 1979, he founded The Nigeria Institute of Chartered Arbitrators (NICArb) as the premier arbitration institute in Nigeria and it was duly incorporated in 1988 under the Companies Act as a legal entity Limited by Guarantee.

A prince from Owu, he was born on 22 March 1934, in Lagos Island, Lagos Colony, Colonial Nigeria, to the Owu royal family of Oba Abdul-Salam Ajibola Gbadela II, who was the traditional ruler of Owu between 1949 and 1972. Ajibola attended both Owu Baptist Day School and Baptist Boys' High School in Abeokuta between 1942 and 1955. He obtained his bachelor's degree in Law (LL.B.) at the Holborn College of Law, University of London between 1959 and 1962 and was called to the English Bar at Lincoln's Inn in 1962. He returned to Nigeria to practise law, specialising in commercial law and international arbitration.

Prince Bola Ajibola was chairman of the panel set up by the Plateau State government to probe the 2008 Jos riots. He established an Islamic and co-educational institution, Crescent University, in Nigeria in 2005, and he served as the chairman of the Board of Trustees of Muslim Ummah of South West Nigeria (MUSWEN).

Ajibola was the high commissioner of Nigeria to the United Kingdom from 1999 to 2002.

== Posts and membership of professional associations ==
- President, Nigerian Bar Association (1984-1985)
- President, The World Association of Judges
- Chairman, Disciplinary Committee of the Bar and General Council of the Bar
- Chairman, Body of Senior Advocates of Nigeria
- Founder, Nigerian Institute of Chartered Arbitrators (NICArb)
- Member, Advisory Judicial Committee
- Member, African Bar Association
- IBA
- Association of World Lawyers
- Commonwealth Law Association
- Vice President, Institute of International Business Law and Practice, Paris
- Vice-Chairman, International Court of Justice, The Hague (1991-1994)
- President, World Bank Administrative Tribunal
- Judge, Constitution Court of Bosnia and Herzegovina (1994-2002)
- Member, the International Centre for Settlement of Investment Disputes (ICSID)
- Member, Permanent Court of Arbitration
- Fellow, Chartered Institute of Arbitrators, London
- Chairman, Cameroon-Nigeria Mixed Commission
- Arbitrator/Commissioner, Eritrea/Ethiopia Boundary Commission

Bola Ajibola was the editor of Nigeria's Treaties in Force from 1970 to 1990 and All-Nigeria Law Reports from 1961 to 1990. He has authored many books including 'Heavens in View', and various papers and articles on a range of legal subjects.

== Personal life and death ==
Ajibola was married to Olufunmilayo Janet Abeni Ajibola, who died in London on 8 June 2016 and Amatullah Olaitan Ajibola He died in Lagos on 8 April 2023, at the age of 89 and was buried the following day in Abeokuta according to Islamic rites.
