= Bayo Ojo =

Former Attorney General of the Federal Republic of Nigeria

Christoper Adebayo Ojo

Federal Minister of Justice
- In office June 2005 – May 2007
- Preceded by: Akin Olujinmi
- Succeeded by: Michael Aondoakaa

Personal details
- Party: People's Democratic Party (Nigeria)
- Spouse: Folashade
- Profession: Lawyer

Christopher Adebayo Ojo, SAN is a former Attorney General of the Federal Republic of Nigeria. As such, he is also a past head of the Nigerian Federal Ministry of Justice. He is a legal practitioner and is licensed to practise in Nigeria, England and Wales. He is a Senior Advocate of Nigeria.

== Early life and education ==
Ojo hails from Ife-Ijumu, Kogi State, in central Nigeria. He had his primary school education in Maiduguri and Kaduna and his post-primary education at Zaria in Kaduna State. He worked briefly as a civil servant in Ilorin, Kwara State, before he proceeded to the University of Lagos (in Lagos) where he obtained a bachelor's degree in Law in June 1977. He is married to Hon. Justice Folashade Bayo-Ojo, and they have two children, Babatomiwa and Olubusola. He has two brothers, Daniel Oluwasegun Ojo and Victor Olanrewaju Ojo.

== Career ==
Ojo was called to the Nigerian Bar in July 1978. He had his first solo court appearance as defence counsel in a rape case before Hon. Justice Anthony Iguh of the High Court of Justice, Enugu, in 1978. The case was a legal aid brief and Ojo lost it because of the overwhelming evidence against his client. He was then a member of the National Youth Service Corps.

He worked at the Ministry of Justice, Kwara State, as a state counsel for four years. During this period, he obtained a certificate in Legal Drafting from Royal Institute of Public Administration, London in September, 1981. Thereafter, he proceeded to the London School of Economics and Political Science, University of London, to obtain LLM in September 1982. In March 1983, he opted out of government service to join the firm of Oniyangi & Co as head of chambers. In 1986, he founded the law firm of Bayo Ojo & Co.

He was elected President of the Nigeria Bar Association (NBA) in 2004. Subsequently, he was appointed Attorney General and Minister of Justice by President Olusegun Obasanjo.

During his term as Attorney-General, he regularly appeared in court personally to argue cases on behalf of the government. Previous attorneys-general had mostly preferred to engage lawyers in private practice to appear for the government. He was noted for his brilliant efforts in decongesting Nigerian prisons by engaging lawyers in private practice to defend various individuals who were being held by the state without trial. He also had a limited measure of success in advocating for an improvement in the welfare of younger lawyers.

As of 2007, he is a member of the United Nations International Law Commission. He remains a close associate of Nasir EL-Rufai and Nuhu Ribadu.

== Bibliography ==
- Oyekunle Tinuade, and Ojo Bayo Handbook of Arbitration and ADR Practice in Nigeria LexisNexis: 2018 ISBN 978-0-639-00355-9
