= Abubakar Malami =

Nigerian politician and lawyer (born 1967)

Abubakar Malami CON SAN

Minister of Justice and Attorney General of the Federation
- In office 11 November 2015 – 29 May 2023
- President: Muhammadu Buhari
- Preceded by: Mohammed Bello Adoke
- Succeeded by: Lateef Fagbemi

Personal details
- Born: 17 April 1967 (age 59) Birnin Kebbi, Northern Region (now in Kebbi State), Nigeria
- Party: African Democratic Congress
- Spouses: Aisha Abubakar Malami; Nana Buhari Malami
- Education: Usmanu Danfodiyo University; University of Maiduguri
- Occupation: Politician; lawyer

Abubakar Malami CON SAN (born 17 April 1967), is a Nigerian lawyer and politician who served as minister of Justice and Attorney General of the Federation from 2015 to 2023.

== Background ==
Abubakar Malami, a Fulani Muslim, was born on 17 April 1967 in Birnin Kebbi, the capital of Kebbi State, Northern Nigeria. His early formal education began at Nassarawa Primary School, Birnin Kebbi before he completed his secondary school education at College of Arts and Arabic Studies. In 1991, he graduated from Usmanu Danfodiyo University where he studied Law and was called to the bar in 1992. He is an alumnus of the University of Maiduguri, where he obtained his master's degree in public administration in 1994. After graduating, he became a legal practitioner, serving in various capacities including being a state counsel and magistrate in Kebbi State, Nigeria.

== Early political career ==
Malami was the National Legal Adviser of the defunct Congress for Progressive Change. He was actively involved in the formation of the All Progressives Congress (APC) in 2013 as the resource person to the Manifesto Drafting Sub-Committee of Inter Joint Party Merger Committees between the Congress for Progressive Change (CPC), Action Congress of Nigeria (ACN) and the All Nigeria Peoples Party (ANPP). In 2014, Abubakar contested for the governorship ticket of the All Progressives Congress in Kebbi State but stepped down during the party primaries in favour of Atiku Bugudu.

== Attorney-General and Minister for Justice ==
On 11 November 2015, Abubakar was appointed as Minister for Justice and Attorney-General of the Federal Republic of Nigeria thus making him the youngest minister in Muhammadu Buhari's cabinet. On 21 August 2019, he was re-appointed as the Minister of Justice and Attorney General of the Federation by President Muhammadu Buhari on 21 August 2019.

=== Tenure ===
In December 2017, Malami announced that the Federal Government has reached an agreement with the United States and Jersey to repatriate over $300 million of Nigerian public funds that had been stolen and stored abroad by former military head of state Sani Abacha. The agreement was finally signed in February 2020 with Malami stating that the federal government intends on using the recovered funds to finance infrastructure, namely the Lagos–Ibadan Expressway, Abuja-Kano highway, and Second Niger Bridge.

In June 2020, Malami filed a petition to the Government to remove the Acting Chairman of the Economic and Financial Crimes Commission (EFCC), Ibrahim Magu. In his petition, he stated that Ibrahim Magu should be sacked on several grounds raging from diversion of recovered loot to insubordination and misconduct. Magu disputed Malami's claims and challenged Malami to present evidence that Magu had diverted funds. Magu was suspended on 7 July 2020 and eventually replaced as EFCC Chairman.

Later in June 2020, Malami wrote to state governors to inform them that no stamp duties had been recovered from 2016 to 2020. He demanded that state ministries, departments, agencies, and other government institutions engage and grant access to recovery agents for the purpose of the audit and recovery of stamp duties "to ensure that all established liabilities are remitted as appropriate."

In October 2020, the office of the Attorney-General won a seven-year long legal battle with Interocean Oil over a contract dispute. The International Centre for Settlement of Investment Disputes ruling in Nigeria's favour relieved the government of $1.5 billion in liability payments and also awarded Nigeria $660,000 in arbitration costs.

As reported by Nelogram, Abubakar Malami published a tell-all memoir and autobiography which chronicled his tenure as the AGF of Nigeria. The title of the memoir is "Traversing the Thorny Terrain of Nigeria’s Justice Sector; My Travails and Triumphs".

== Corruption and professional misconduct allegations ==
=== Attempts to remove SAN rank ===
In June 2019, Malami appeared before a disciplinary panel of the Legal Practitioners’ Privileges Committee to face the petitioners seeking the stripping of his Senior Advocate of Nigeria rank for alleged misconduct. The case was dismissed due to procedural issues on the part of the claimant.

In 2020, a lawyer, Izu Aniagu, submitted a new petition to the Legal Practitioners’ Privileges Committee to remove Malami's Senior Advocate of Nigeria rank. Aniagu's petition, which received over 10,000 online signatures, was based on the claim that Malami unilaterally deleted certain provisions of the Rules of Professional Conduct for Legal Practitioners in violation of the law. Later in 2020, Aniagu accused the LPPC and Chief Justice Tanko Muhammad of purposeful inaction on his petition.

=== Oil asset auction ===
As a part of the dispute between Malami and then-EFCC Chairman Ibrahim Magu, reports came out in July 2020 that Malami and Magu had clashed over and given conflicting orders on seized assets, notably when Malami authorised the auction of several sea vessels holding crude oil and diesel. Malami directed Omoh-Jay Nigeria Ltd. to auction the vessels despite previous theft allegations against the company. Umar Gwandu, Malami's spokesman, claimed that the auction was not illegal and Omo-Jay was innocent until proven guilty. Gwandu later said that the auction allegation and other corruption allegations had "caused [Malami] considerable distress, psychological trauma, anxiety and greatly injured his character and reputation."

=== Family wealth ===
Various Sahara Reporters investigations have alleged that Malami and his family has amassed "unexplained wealth" while Malami served as Attorney-General. The reports have outlined how Malami himself owns a hotel in Sokoto, four houses in Abuja, a school in Birnin Kebbi, and a hotel under construction in Abuja. Malami was also shown to have bought two houses for his sons in Birnin Kebbi and an event centre called Azbir Arena for one of his sons; both sons were also known to drive expensive cars and have no known work history. The Malami family also were seen leaving chartered private jets when arriving in Birnin Kebbi for a family wedding.

After the publication of the initial reports in July 2020, Malami's lawyer, Sunday Ameh, wrote to Police Inspector General Mohammed Adamu to call for investigation into Sahara Reporters and its founder Omoyele Sowore. In August, Malami wrote to President Buhari, stating that his wealth had come from business and investments from prior to becoming AG. Malami claimed that he declared all assets in the assets declarations filed with the Code of Conduct Bureau upon appointment in 2015 and again upon re-appointment in 2019.

=== Alleged diversion of recovered money ===
In May 2021, Malami appeared before a House committee to answer for suspected diversion of recovered laundered money intended for the consolidated revenue account along with other alleged improprieties. Malami and his office were accused of improperly funding the office budget with around ₦800 billion of recovered looted money by several Representatives including committee chair Adejoro Adeogun. Malami denied his office received any money from the recovered money account and the Accountant General Ahmed Idris supported Malami, claiming that the consolidated revenue account and recovered loot account are all subsets of the same Treasury Single Account making it appear as if the funds were transferred to the AGF office. The next day, Adeogun and others continued questioning Malami, now about a reported illegal ₦2 billion payment from the Central Bank of Nigeria to Malami and an alleged request from Malami for "payment of approved solicitors’ fees" from the recovered loot account. Malami denied requesting payments from the recovered loot account, but did not comment on the ₦2 billion payment from the CBN.

In August 2021, the Attorneys-General of all 36 states sued Malami, accusing him of failure to allocate recovered funds to the states.

=== Interference in corruption investigations ===
As Attorney-General, Malami has the power to intervene in and take over any prosecution and has been accused of using that power to stop cases against allies. Cases which Malami took over but were later withdrawn include cases against NFF President Amaju Pinnick and other NFF officials, former Senate President Bukola Saraki, three former Katsina State government officials, accused money launderer Akinola Ogunlewe, and most notably, the case of Gombe Central Senator and former Gombe State Governor Danjuma Goje whose eight year-long, ₦25 billion fraud trial was stopped by Malami about a month after Goje agreed to support Buhari's preferred Senate President candidate. As public outcry grew over the interference, Malami defended himself by saying if he wanted to stop corruption investigations, he would have dismissed all EFCC corruption cases and claimed that the case against Goje was weak.

In August 2021, reports came out that Malami was supporting a bill to transfer all prosecuting and investigative powers to the Office of the Attorney-General. Passage of the bill would remove the independence of anti-corruption agencies by putting them underneath the AG with Sahara Reporters reporting that Malami's intention was to stop the prosecution of his allies. Just three months after the reports, Malami sent a letter to the EFCC stalling the corruption trial of former Aviation Minister and Anambra North Senator Stella Oduah not long after she defected to the APC.

=== Money laundering charges ===
In December 2025, the Economic and Financial Crimes Commission, EFCC, arraigned Malami alongside his wife, Bashir Asabe, and son, Abdulaziz Malami, before Justice Emeka Nwite of the Federal High Court, Maitama, Abuja, over alleged money laundering offences to the tune of N8, 713,923, 759.49( Eight Billion, Seven Hundred and Thirteen Million, Nine Hundred and Twenty Three Thousand, Seven Hundred and Fifty Nine Naira, Forty Nine Kobo).

=== Terrorism financing charges ===
In February 2026, the State Security Service (SSS) arraigned Malami and his son before the Federal High Court in Abuja on six counts related to terrorism financing and unlawful possession of firearms. Prosecutors alleged that Malami abetted terrorism financing by failing to prosecute suspected terrorism financiers whose case files had been forwarded to his office while he served as Attorney-General of the Federation. Malami and his son pleaded not guilty to the charges.

== Philanthropy ==
Malami co-founded the Khadimiyya for Justice and Development Initiative (KJDI), a non-profit organization focuses on advancement of human society through fostering access to justice for citizens, and investing in human capital.

The NGO's goal is to help people from rural communities in improving their living condition through the provision of basic social amenities. The organization supports them with foodstuffs, medical care, water supply, and employment opportunities.

During the COVID-19 pandemic and its resulting economic effects, KJDI facilitated the securing and distribution of ₦3.2 billion credits facilities loan to nearly 5,900 people in 21 local government areas of Kebbi State for poverty alleviation and youths empowerment. Moreover, as part of the foundation's mission, Malami donated 16 million naira to flood victims in Kebbi and a 110 KVA generator to Equity FM radio station in Birnin Kebbi while KJDI provided 236 boreholes to rural communities.

== Honours ==
- Life Bencher – 2020

== See also ==
- Cabinet of Nigeria
