= Afam Osigwe =

Nigerian lawyer (born 1972)

President, Nigerian Bar Association
- Incumbent
- Assumed role August 2024
- Preceded by: Yakubu Maikyau, SAN
- Succeeded by: Oyinkansola Badejo-Okusanya

Personal details
- Born: 25 October 1972 (age 53)
- Spouse: Ukamaka Osigwe
- Occupation: Lawyer

Afam Josiah Osigwe (born 25 October 1972) is a Nigerian lawyer who has served as president of the Nigerian Bar Association from 29 August 2024 to 28 August 2026.

== Early life and education ==
Osigwe was born on 25 October 1972. He graduated from the University of Nigeria in 1997 and was called to the Bar in 1999. In 2007, he obtained a Master of Laws (LL.M) from the University of Jos. He also holds an LL.M in Transnational Commercial Practice from the Centre for International Legal Studies in Austria, and in 2010 he received a Diploma in International Commercial Arbitration from Keble College, Oxford.

== Career ==
Osigwe began his legal practice with Chike Chigbue & Co. in Abuja in 1999 and left in 2002 to establish his own firm, Law Forte. In 2006, he was appointed a notary public of the Supreme Court of Nigeria. He became a fellow of the Chartered Institute of Arbitrators (UK) in 2011.

Osigwe served as general secretary of the Nigerian Bar Association from 2014 to 2016 and has been president from 29 August 2024 to 28 August 2026.

== Personal life ==
Osigwe is married to Ukamaka Osigwe, and they have three children.
