= Michael Agbamuche =

Nigerian jurist

Michael Ashikodi Agbamuche
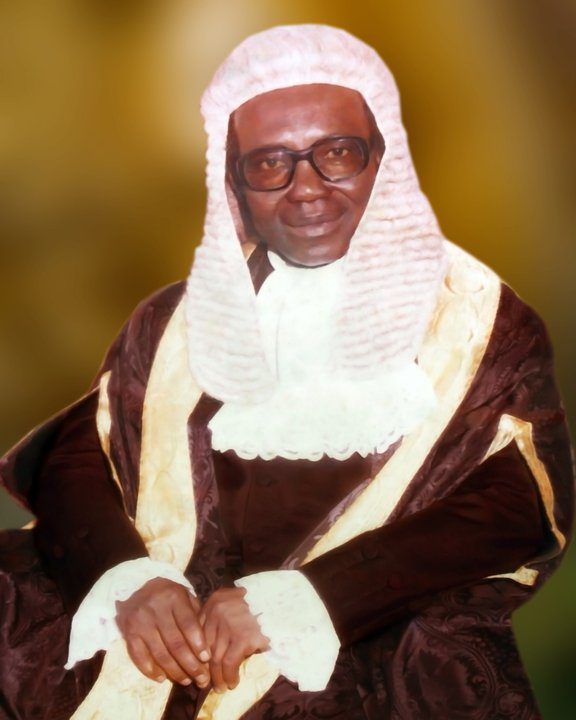

Attorney General & Minister for Justice of Nigeria
- In office September 1994 – 1997
- Preceded by: Olu Onagoruwa
- Succeeded by: Abdullahi Ibrahim

Personal details
- Born: 16 August 1920 Akwukwu-Igbo
- Died: 17 April 1998 (aged 77)
- Education: King's College London

Michael Ashikodi Agbamuche (16 August 1920 – 17 April 1998) was a former Attorney General and Minister of Justice for the Federal Republic of Nigeria from September 1994 to 1997, a Senior Advocate of Nigeria (SAN), was elected in 1979 to the Federal House of Representatives and the Nnaobodo of Akwukwu-Igbo.

== Early life and education ==
Michael Agbamuche was born on 16 August 1920 in Akwukwu-Igbo where he attended St John's Anglican primary school. He worked as a clerical officer at the then government secretariat Kaduna until he passed his Senior Cambridge exams and proceeded to london for further studies. He enrolled in a one-year introduction course at the Battersea Polytechnic Institute now the University of Surrey from 1950 to 1951 before proceeding to King's College London where he obtained a degree in Law. He was called to the English bar at Middle Temple on 24 June 1958. He returned to Nigeria and enrolled as a barrister and solicitor with the Supreme Court of Nigeria in 1958.

== Career, appointments and politics (timeline) ==
In 1962, Michael Agbamuche was appointed coroner for Kano and Katsina provinces by Her Majesty Queen Elizabeth II the Queen of Nigeria on the recommendation of the Premier of the Northern region & Sardauna of Sokoto Sir Ahmadu Bello. He remained in private legal practice in the northern city of Kano until 1966. In 1967, he was the Principal state counsel, ministry of justice in the Midwestern region. He returned to private practice in Lagos in 1970. In 1976 he went into politics and was elected councillor for Oshimili local government. On the platform of the Nigerian People's Party (NPP) in 1979 he was elected and became a member of the House of Representatives.

In 1984 he was made a Senior Advocate of Nigeria (SAN) by the Chief Justice of Nigeria on the recommendation of the Legal Practitioners Privileges Committee. In September 1994 he was appointed Attorney General & Minister for Justice for the Federal Republic of Nigeria, a position he held until 1997. He died on 17 April 1998.
