= Idowu Sofola =

President of the Nigerian Bar Association
- In office 1980–1982

Chairman of the Nigerian Body of Benchers
- In office March 30, 2012 – 2013

Personal details
- Born: 29 September 1934 Ikenne, Ogun State, Nigeria
- Died: 23 March 2018 (aged 83)

Chief Idowu Sofola, SAN, MON (29 September 1934 – 23 March 2018) was a Nigerian jurist, Bencher and president of the Nigerian Bar Association. He was Previously the Chairman of the Nigerian Body of Benchers.

== Early life ==
Chief Idowu was born in September 1934 at Ikenne, a town in Ogun State in southwestern Nigeria. He was enrolled at St. Saviour's School, Ikenne in 1945 for his primary education. In 1952, he was admitted into Eko Boys High School, where he completed his Secondary education. Upon completion of his secondary school education, he joined the Lagos State Judiciary in 1958 as a Court Clerk, having decided this to be a pathway to understanding the practice of Law. He thereafter journeyed to the United Kingdom where he obtained a bachelor's degree in Law from the London School of Commerce and Holborn College. He was called to the English bar at Lincoln's Inn in July 1962, the same year he returned to Nigeria for legal practice.

== Law career ==
Idowu began his career at the Supreme Court of Nigeria on July 30, 1962 when he was enrolled as a Solicitor and Advocate by Honourable Justice Sir Adetokunbo Ademola KBE, GCON, PC, SAN, having been sponsored by Chief Remilekun Fani-Kayode QC, SAN and Kehinde Sofola CON, SAN. Some of his contemporaries were Late Chief M.A Kuku (Ogbeni Oja of Ijebu Ode), Chief Akin Delano, among several successful lawyers. In May 1989, he rose to the zenith of his career as Senior Advocate of Nigeria and in 1980, he was elected as president of the Nigerian Bar Association, a position he held until his tenure elapsed in 1982. On March 30, 2012, he was elected Chairman of the Nigerian Body of Benchers to succeed Dahiru Musdapher. Idowu was the first African to be elected as the Secretary General of the International Bar Association.

== Personal life ==
He was a brother to Kehinde Sofola SAN, the father of Kayode Sofola, a Senior Advocate of Nigeria and former chairman of United Bank for Africa. He was married to Chief Mrs. Olusola Sofola, with whom he had four children, the most prominent of whom is Sina Sofola SAN. He also had a daughter who is a Judge of the Lagos State High Court, Hon. Justice Yetunde Pinheiro (married to prominent Senior Advocate of Nigeria, Kemi Pinheiro, SAN). The other children are Kola Sofola (a former banker turned businessman), Leke Sofola (a former banker turned businessman) and Femi Sofola (a Chartered Insurance Practitioner and Executive with Tangerine Insurance). He also had 13 grandchildren; the first grandchild is Folakunmi Pinheiro, a PhD in Law Candidate at Darwin College, Cambridge.

== Membership ==
- Nigerian Bar Association
- International Bar Association
- Nigerian Body of Benchers
