= Isa Chiroma =

Nigerian legal practitioner and administrator

Isa Hayatu Chiroma

Director General of the Nigeria Law School
- In office February 2018 – January 2026
- Preceded by: Olanrewaju Onadeko
- Succeeded by: Gbemisola Odusote

Personal details
- Born: 13 April 1963 (age 63) Mubi, Adamawa State
- Education: University of Maiduguri; University of Jos
- Occupation: legal practitioner, lecturer

Isa Hayatu Chiroma (born 13 April 1963) is a Nigerian legal practitioner, professor of law at the University of Maiduguri and former Director General of the Nigerian Law School. He was appointed as the Director General of the Nigeria Law School in February 2018 by Muhammadu Buhari. He served in that capacity till January 2026. He replaced Professor Olanrewaju Onadeko who served for eight years. Prior to his appointment, he was the deputy director in the Yola campus of Nigeria Law School from 2011 to 2016.

He became a Senior Advocate of Nigeria, ranked at the 133 plenary session meetings in 2018.

== Background ==
Isa Hayatu was born in Mubi of Mubi North Local Government, Adamawa State. He began his early school in 1970 at Mubi Primary School to 1976 and moved to Government Technical School Mubi in 1976 to 1981. He obtained his bachelor's of law degree in 1986 and masters of law in 1991 from the University of Maiduguri, and holds a PhD of law in 2005 at the University of Jos.

== Career ==
He started as an assistant lecturer in the faculty of law at the University of Maiduguri in 1988 teaching administrative, constitutional, Islamic, policy and humanitarian, environmental law and Islamic jurisprudence courses the same year he was called to Bar and became professor of law in 2005. He served as head of department in Public, Shari’ah law, Dean of Law and director in Consultancy Services Centre in the University of Maiduguri. He founded and coordinate the Clinical Legal Education Programme and rose to become a member in the University Senate, he is a Member in Legal Practitioners, Privileges Committee for Selection of Senior Advocate of Nigeria in Academics and member Governing Council of Federal Polytechnic Mubi, Adamawa State.

His areas of specialization was Environmental Law and Policy, Humanitarian Law, Human Rights, Access to Justice, Law and Development and Ethics in the teaching and practice of Law.

Chiroma had supervised many research based on his area of interest and is a member African Law Association of Germany, Global Alliance for Justice Education, International Bar Association, Nigerian Institute of Mediators and Conciliators, Nigerian Bar Association, Society for Corporate Governance and Fellow of the Chartered Institute of Arbitrators, and is a Notary Public person.
