= Dan Onuorah Ibekwe =

Nigerian jurist

President of the Nigerian courts of appeals
- In office 1976–1978
- Succeeded by: Nasir Mamman

Personal details
- Born: 23 June 1919 Onitsha, Anambra, Nigeria
- Died: 1978 (aged 58–59)
- Party: Non partisian

Dan Onuorah Ibekwe, // was a Nigerian Jurist, former President of the Nigerian courts of appeals and Justice of the Supreme Court of Nigeria. He was succeeded by Justice Nasir Mamman following his demise in 1978.

== Life ==
Daniel Onwurah Ibekwe was born on 23 June 1919, in Onitsha, the son of Akukalia and Amaliwu Ibekwe. He started primary education at St Mary's School and then attended Christ the King College both schools are in Onitsha. Furthering his education, he studied law at the Council of Legal Education, London. He was called to the bar in 1951. He started practicing law in the private firm of John Idowu Conrad Taylor but later moved to Aba in 1954. He joined the regional public service in 1956 as a legal adviser to the premier of the region and from 1958 to 1964, he was Solicitor General and Permanent Seceretary, Ministry of Justice, Eastern Region. Between 1965 and 1966, he was a senator and Minister in Charge of Commonwealth Relations, Ministry of External Affairs.

Ibekwe was made a Supreme Court judge in 1972 and was at the court until 1975 when he was appointed Attorney General of the Federation by the then Head of State, Late General Murtala Muhammed. In 1975, he served briefly as the Federal Commissioner of Justice but with the establishment of the Court of Appeal in 1976, he was appointed as the court's first president.
