= Amari Omaka Chukwu =

Senior Advocate of Nigeria

Amari Omaka Chukwu is a Nigerian professor of Environmental, Water and Natural Resources Law. He is Dean Faculty of Law at the Ebonyi State University, the Commissioner for Tertiary Education of Ebonyi State and the first Senior Advocate of Nigeria (SAN) from Ebonyi state.

== Background and education ==
Omaka was born and is from Amasiri in Afikpo, Ebonyi State. He attained his Law degree from the University of Nigeria. He later attained his Master in Law from the University of Lagos and then a Doctor of Laws from the University of Nigeria.

== Career ==
Omaka is a professor of environmental, water and natural resources Law. He is also the Dean faculty of Law at the Ebonyi State University. He is the commissioner for Tertiary Education of Ebonyi State. In 2016, he was conferred in the rank of Senior Advocate of Nigeria (SAN), making him the first SAN from Ebonyi State.

He was the president of the National Association of Law Teachers. He is the founding director of the Ebonyi State University Law Clinic. He was appointed the national chairman of the Forum of Commissioners for Education of Nigeria. He is also a visiting professor at the department of Enugu State University of Science and Technology. In 2025, he was the commissioner of tetiary education in Ebonyi state who oversaw the first set Ebonyi post graduate scholarship to the UK, as well as overseeing the security overhaul of tetiary schools in the state. He was part of the cabinet reshufflement by the Ebonyi state governor Francis Nwifuru. He has written several a adademic journals.

He advocated for stopping the harassment of Nigerian lawyers by the Department of State Security.
