= Nigerian Body of Benchers =

Professional body in charge of student into law school of Nigeria

- Type: Professional Association
- Purpose: Regulate legal professionalism
- Region served: Nigeria
- Members: Renewable
- Official language: English
- Chairman: Hon. Justice Mary Peter Odili CFR, JSC (Rtd)

The Nigerian Body of Benchers is a professional body concerned with the admission of successful candidates into the Legal Profession at the Nigerian Law School Bar Final Examination. Members of the body are called Benchers. The body also regulate the call of graduate of law school to the Nigerian Bar as well as the regulation of the legal profession in Nigeria.

== Principal officers ==
The current Chairman of the body is Chief Adegboyega Awomolo, SAN who succeeded Hon. Justice Mary Peter Odili in March 2024. Hon Justice Mary Peter Odili CFR, JSC (Rtd) who succeeded Chief Wole Olanipekun, OFR, SAN in April 2023. Olanipekun succeeded Hon. Justice Olabode Rhodes-Vivour in March 2022 after a long list of successions, including the past Chairmen such as Hon. Justice Dr. I. T. Muhammad, CFR, 2019, ALH. Bashir M. Dalhatu, 2018, Hon. Justice W.S.N Onnoghen, GCON, 2017, Chief Bandele A. Aiku, SAN, 2016 (deceased), Hon. Justice, Mahmud Mohammed, GCON, 2015, Chief T.J.O Okpoko who was elected on 30 March 2014 to succeed Aloma Mariam Mukhtar the Chief Justice of Nigeria and Mahmud Mohammed the vice president at the time.

== Notable members ==
- Dahiru Musdapher (1942-2018), Chief Justice of the Supreme Court of Nigeria
- Aloma Mariam Mukhtar (b. 1944), first female Chief Justice of Nigeria
- Idowu Sofola (1934-2018), President of the Nigerian Bar Association
- Kehinde Sofola (1924-2007), Minister of Justice
- Wole Olanipekun (b. 1951), former President of the Nigerian Bar Association and Senior Advocate of Nigeria
- Senator Michael Opeyemi Bamidele, CON (b. 1963) Senate Leader, 10th National Assembly
- Okey Wali (b. 1958), the 26th President of the Nigerian Bar Association
- Joseph Bodurin Daudu (b. 1959), former President of the Nigerian Bar Association in 2010-2012
- Kayode Ajulo SAN (b. 1974), Hon. Attorney General & Commissioner for Justice, Ondo State
- Mudiaga Odje SAN (1923-2005), President of the Nigerian Bar Association (NBA) in 1974-1976
- Muiz Banire SAN (b. 1966), three-term commissioner of Lagos State
- Ishaq Bello (b. 1956), Chief Judge of the Federal Capital Territory (FCT)
