= Solomon Adun Asemota =

Nigerian lawyer (born 1938)

Solomon Adun Asemota SAN
- Born: 8 December 1938 (age 87); Benin City, Edo State, Nigeria
- Education: University of Benin
- Occupation: Lawyer
- Years active: 1970-present

Solomon Adun Asemota (born December 8, 1938 is a Nigerian lawyer and human rights activist. He is the Founder and Principal Partner of the Law Firm of Solomon Asemota & Co(since 1970).

He has written several publications dedicated to effecting a change in the state of the Nation.

He became a Senior Advocate of Nigeria (SAN) in 1986.

== Early life and education ==
Asemota was born on 8 December 1938 in Benin City, Edo State. He began his education in 1945 at St. Luke School in Jos, and later attended Immaculate Conception College in Benin City, completing his secondary education in 1958.

In 1959, he enrolled in the Cadet Sub-Inspectors’ Course at the Southern Police College in Ikeja, Lagos, followed by Advanced Police Training in 1962 at Wakefield Police College, Yorkshire, England. In 1969, he attended the Scottish Police College in Kincardine, Scotland, where he received senior officers’ training in organization and management.

Between 1964 and 1969, Asemota studied Law at the University of Lagos, and earned a degree in Bachelor of Laws (LL.B. Hons). After completing his studies at the Nigerian Law School in 1970, he was called to the bar as a barrister.

== Career ==
Asemota founded the law firm Solomon Asemota & Co. in 1970, where he serves as principal partner. The firm maintains offices in Benin City, Lagos, Port Harcourt, Abuja and London.

In 1986, he was conferred with the rank of Senior Advocate of Nigeria.
