= Nabo Graham-Douglas =

Nigerian lawyer (1926–1983)

Nabo Graham-Douglas SAN
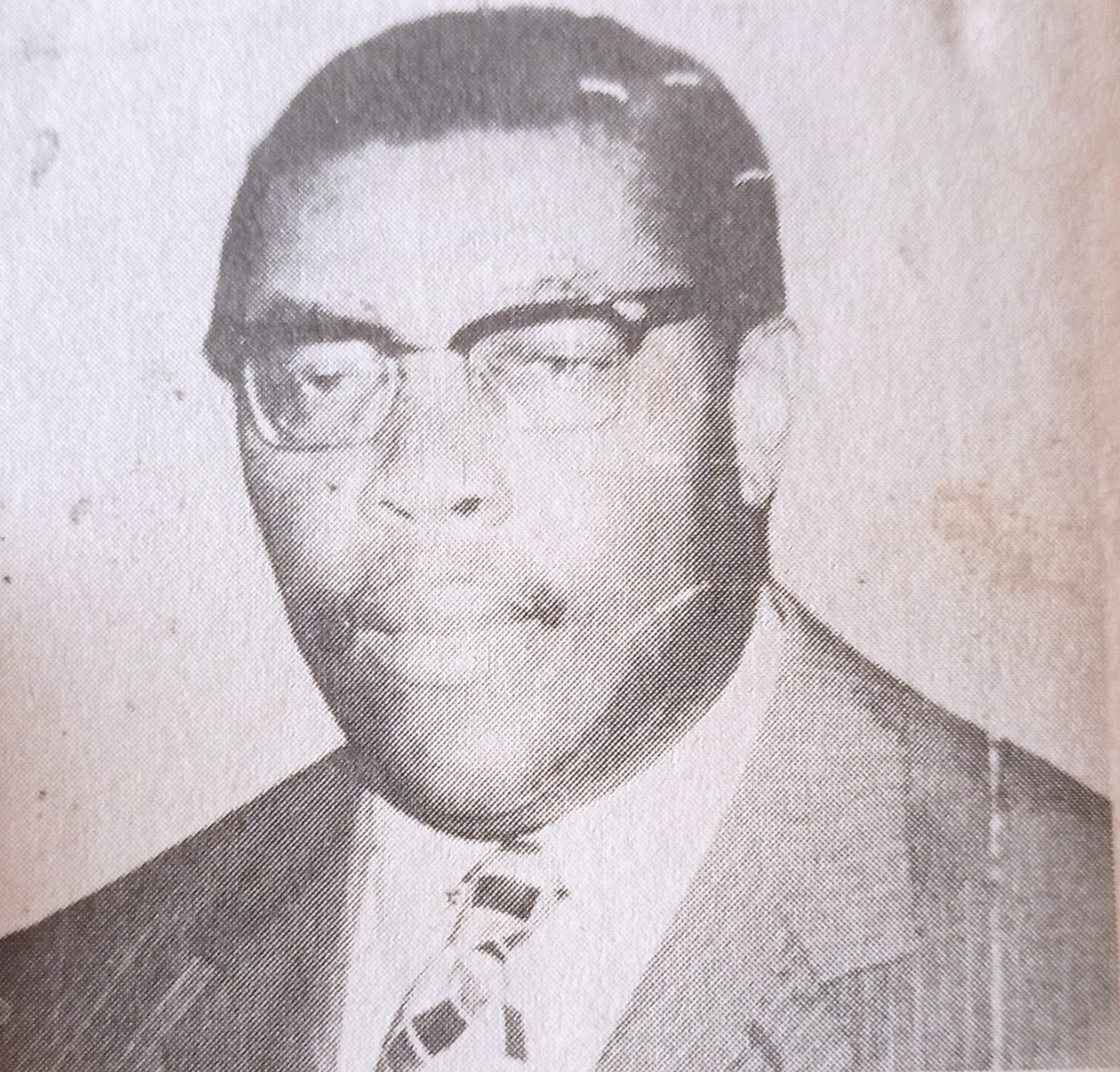
- Born: 15 July 1926; Abonnema, Southern Region, British Nigeria (now in Rivers State, Nigeria)
- Died: 18 December 1983 (aged 57)
- Height: 2.26 m (7 ft 5 in)
- Relatives: Alabo Tonye Graham-Douglas

Nabo Bekinbo Graham-Douglas, SAN (15 July 1926 – 18 December 1983) was a Nigerian lawyer who became federal commissioner of justice and Attorney General of the Federation in 1972.

== Early life ==
Graham-Douglas was born on 15 July 1926 in Abonnema in Rivers State.

== Education ==
Graham-Douglas began his elementary education at Nyemoni Primary School in Abonnema and then attended Kalabari National College in Buguma. He proceeded to Exeter University in England for legal studies. He then entered King's College, University of London, and later the Institute of Advanced Studies in London, where he was called to bar on 23 November 1954.

== Career ==
After returning to Nigeria, Graham-Douglas set up a private practice and won recognition for the many successful cases he defended. Following the first military coup that toppled the Government of Alhaji Sir Abubakar Tafawa Balewa in January 1966, Nabo was appointed to serve as Attorney-General for Eastern Nigeria to succeed Dr. Christopher Chukwuemeka Mojekwu by the new Military Government. He could not retain his office because of the hostilities between the federal authorities and breakaway Biafra. He was point-blank opposed to the secession of the Eastern region and eventually resigned his post. He was detained briefly by the secessionists later, ending his tenure as Attorney-General of the region in September 1967. Following the constitutional re-arrangements which allowed for the splitting of Nigeria's four regions into 12 states, the Eastern region was split into East-Central, Cross Rivers and Rivers State. Graham-Douglas was appointed the Attorney-General and Commissioner for Justice of Rivers State. He remained in that post for three years, and then in 1972, he was appointed Attorney-General and Commissioner for Justice for the Federation in the regime of General Yakubu Gowon.

== Later life and death ==
After the coup of July 1975 which overthrew the Government of General Yakubu Gowon, Graham-Douglas lost his post as Attorney-General and went once more into private practice until his death on 18 December 1983.
