= Priscilla Kuye =

Nigerian lawyer (born 1940)

- Born: August 18, 1940 (age 85)
- Education: University of London
- Occupation: Lawyer
- Known for: First and only Female President of the Nigerian Bar Association

Dame Priscilla Olabori Kuye (born 18 August 1940) is a Nigerian lawyer and the first female president of the Nigerian Bar Association (1991-1992). She served the Nigerian Bar Association (NBA) as national financial secretary, 3rd vice, 2nd vice and 1st vice president, before becoming the first female president of the NBA. She was a trustee for the association from 2004 to 2019. She was knighted by Pope John Paul II in 1981. Kuye is also a former vice president of the Nigerian-American Chamber of Commerce, former president of Nigerian-American Chamber of Commerce, and the first regional vice president of the International Federation of Women Lawyers for Africa in Nigeria between 1979 and 1981. She is a life member of the Body of Benchers and was the chairman, Human Rights Committee of the NBA. In 1993, she was elected vice president of the Commonwealth Lawyers Association. She established Priscilla O. Kuye and Company, her law firm in 1970. She was offered a seat at the Court of Appeal in 1992 but she rejected the offer.

Kuye was married to the late High Chief Omowale Kuye, Otun Olubadan of Ibadanland. They had a son, Ademola, and a daughter, Onikepo, who is a lawyer and journalist currently serving as Editor of This Day Law.
