= Kehinde Sofola =

Nigerian jurist

- Born: 10 March 1924; Ogun State, Nigeria
- Died: 25 March 2007 (aged 83); Ikoyi, Lagos, Nigeria
- Citizenship: Nigerian
- Occupations: lawyer; solicitor; judge
- Awards: SAN; CON; MON

Chief Kehinde Sofola, QC, SAN, MON, CON (10 March 1924 – 25 March 2007) was a prominent Nigerian Jurist and Minister of Justice during the Second Nigerian Republic.

== Early life and career ==
Chief Sofola was born on March 10, 1924, as one of the second of three sets of twins in Ogun State, southwestern Nigeria. He was called to the English bar on September 11, 1954. He was the founder of Kehinde Sofola's Chamber a law firm in Lagos State where Ayotunde Phillips, the Chief Judge of Lagos State began her career in September 1976. He became a Senior Advocate of Nigeria in 1978.

== Personal life ==
He was an elder brother to Idowu Sofola, the Chairman of the Nigerian Body of Benchers. His eldest son Kayode Sofola is a Senior Advocate of Nigeria and former Chairman of United Bank for Africa.
