= Olaoluwa Abagun =

Nigerian lawyer and women's rights activist

- Born: 24 August 1992 (age 34); Lagos, Nigeria
- Citizenship: Nigeria
- Education: Degree - Obafemi Awolowo University; College - Queen's College, Lagos
- Occupations: Lawyer; women rights activist
- Notable work: She is the Founder of the Girl Pride Circle Initiative

Olaoluwa Abagun is a Nigerian lawyer and women's rights activist.

== Early life and education ==
Abagun was born in Lagos. She graduated from Queen's College, Lagos, in 2008 where she received the "Outstanding Service to College Life Award" as the Deputy Head-Girl of the college. Shortly after, she proceeded to Obafemi Awolowo University where she obtained her degree, a Bachelor of Laws (LL.B) Degree and she however pursued a Master of Arts degree in Gender and Development at the Institute of Development Studies, University of Sussex. She identifies as a Christian.

Abagun was born in an inter-religious family. Her father is a Muslim, while her mother is a Christian. She is the only female child of her parents' four children. Growing up, she described her childhood as being treated the same as her brothers, as her parents treated her with little form of gender consciousness. In another interview, she revealed that her parents unknowingly set her on the path of feminism. She traced her passion for human rights to a speech on understanding the child rights act when she was 13.

At 15, she met with the then Governor Babatunde Fashola and his cabinet, and she was rewarded with a computer. Abagun described this event as an encouraging factor in her determination for pursuing women's advocacy.

== Activism ==
Before graduating with a law degree in 2015, Abagun wrote articles centered on women's issues and was a 2014 finalist at the "Africa Youth Day Essay Competition" for her work titled Policies on the Empowerment of Young Women in Africa: The Missing Piece in the African Jigsaw. Abagun also created "Girl Pride Circle", an organization that fights for the rights of women in Nigeria.

In March 2016, at the UN Commission on the Status of Women, the empowerment of girls, she launched Safe Kicks Initiative: Adolescent Girls Against Sexual Violence, which aims to train victims of sexual violence and women in general on how to defend themselves physically through learning martial arts. By July 2016, she was reported to be training over 250 female teenagers through this project. She also became the only Nigerian to be awarded monetary grant from Women Deliver organization. Abagun Olaoluwa also addressed the 72nd Session of the United Nations General Assembly with a speech on gender issues.

In July 2017, she was selected as one of the six "exceptional" Nigerians to discuss on the topic Fast Forward: Preparing the World to Come with members of UK parliament. She noted that she would put effort in ensuring "gender equality" and increase the political consciousness of Nigerian women through advocating for better welfare, education and government policies.

On feminism, she described it as "ensuring everyone, both male and female deserves ample space to explore their full potentials", while re-echoing the statement of Chimamanda Ngozi Adichie that "we all should be feminist". She also noted that people should not be seen with emphasis on gender in mind. She defined feminism as "an ideology that simply champions equal socio-economic opportunities for all, regardless of gender", noting that "it is not a battle of the sexes" as being misconstrued by many. In January 2018, she voiced her discontent about the lack of interest in politics from Nigerian women, admonishing them to partake in the Nigerian general election, 2019.
