= Wole Olanipekun =

Nigerian jurist

Wole Olanipekun OFR, CFR, SAN
- Born: Oluwole Oladapo Olanipekun; 18 November 1951; Ekiti State, Nigeria
- Citizenship: Nigerian
- Occupations: Lawyer; Solicitor; Activist
- Years active: July 1975 - present
- Awards: OFR, CFR

Wole Olanipekun GCON OFR CFR SAN (born 18 November 1951) is a Nigerian Lawyer and former President of the Nigerian Bar Association and Senior Advocate of Nigeria.

== Early life ==
A native of Ikere-Ekiti, he attended Amoye Grammar School in Ikere-Ekiti, Ekiti State southwestern Nigeria but obtained the West Africa School Certificate at Ilesa Grammar before he proceeded to the University of Lagos, where he obtained a bachelor's degree in Law.

== Professional career ==
He was Called to the bar in July 1976 after he graduated from the Nigerian Law School and subsequently attained the rank of Senior Advocate of Nigeria in July 1991, the same year in which he was appointed as Attorney General and Commissioner for Justice of Ondo State and served in that capacity for two years. In 2002, he was elected as President of the Nigerian Bar Association. In January 2007, he became a Life bencher, appointed by the Nigerian Body of Benchers. He was the Pro-Chancellor and Chairman of Governing Council of the University of Ibadan between 2004 and 2006. In April 2014, he was appointed the Pro-Chancellor and Chairman of the Governing Council of Ajayi Crowther University, Oyo, by the institution’s proprietor, Supra Diocesan Board West of the Church of Nigeria (Anglican Communion). In 2003, he was appointed the Vice President of the Pan African Lawyers Union (PALU). Chief Oluwole Olanipekun, SAN, OFR is the Principal Partner of Wole Olanipekun and Co, a leading law firm in Nigeria with the headquarters in Lagos State, Nigeria, branch in Abuja and presence in all the states in Nigeria. He is the current Pro-Chancellor and Chairman of Governing Council of the University of Lagos.

== Personal life ==
Olanipekun is married to Erelu Omo-ale Olanipekun and they have four children. He is a grandfather.

== Membership ==
- Nigerian Bar Association
- International Bar Association
- Nigerian Body of Benchers

== Awards ==
On 17 September 2012, a Nigerian national honour of Officer of the Order of the Federal Republic (OFR) was conferred on him by President Goodluck Ebele Jonathan.

In October 2022, a Nigerian national honour of Commander of the Order of the Federal Republic (CFR) was conferred on him by President Muhammadu Buhari.
