= Reality Asemota =

Nigerian footballer (born 2002)

Personal information
- Full name: Reality Arase Asemota
- Date of birth: 16 December 2002 (age 23)
- Height: 1.85 m (6 ft 1 in)
- Position: Midfielder

Team information
- Current team: Grazer AK
- Number: 29

Youth career
- 2013–2017: SV Thal
- 2017–2020: Grazer AK

Senior career*
Years	Team	Apps	(Gls)
2020–	Grazer AK	14	(0)
2021	→ SC Kalsdorf (loan)	13	(1)
- * Club domestic league appearances and goals as of 1 April 2022

Reality Arase Asemota (born 16 December 2002) is a Nigerian footballer who plays as a midfielder for Austrian club Grazer AK.

== Career statistics ==
=== Club ===
As of 13 June 2020.

Club	Season	League			Cup		Other		Total	
Club	Season	Division	Apps	Goals	Apps	Goals	Apps	Goals	Apps	Goals
Grazer AK	2019–20	2. Liga	2	0	0	0	0	0	2	0
Career total			2	0	0	0	0	0	2	0
