= Clement Akpamgbo =

Nigeria lawyer

Clement Akpamgbo SAN was a Nigerian lawyer who was attorney-general of the federation between 1991 and 1993 during Nigeria's failed transition from military to democratic government. Before his ministerial appointment, he was the president of the Nigerian Bar Association. In 1993, Akpamgbo sided with the camp that supported the suspension of presidential elections on June 12, 1993, basing his argument on an order from procured by the Arthur Nzeribe-led Association of a Better Nigeria from an Abuja High Court halting the conduct of the election.

Akpamgbo became a senior advocate in 1985, after twenty years of teaching and practicing law in the country.
