= Paul Usoro =

Nigerian lawyer

President of the Nigerian Bar Association
- In office August 2018 – July 2020
- Preceded by: Mahmoud Abubakar Balarabe

Personal details
- Born: 7 September 1958 Akwa Ibom State, Nigeria
- Party: Non-partisian

Chief Paul Usoro, SAN, (born September 7, 1958) is a Nigerian litigator, communication law expert and president of the Nigerian Bar Association.

== Early life ==
Usoro was born on September 7, 1958, at Ukana Ikot Ntuen town in Essien Udim local government area of Akwa Ibom State, south-south Nigeria. He obtained a bachelor's degree in law from Obafemi Awolowo University, Ile-Ife, Osun state in 1981 and called to the bar in 1982. He attained the rank of Senior Advocate of Nigeria in 2003.

== Career ==
He began his law career in 1983, when he joined Sani Mohammed Kuso & Co, Kaduna. In 1985, he founded his own legal outfit called Paul Usoro and Co in Kaduna and in 1992 the headquarters was established in Lagos with the Kaduna office still operational until 2003.

Usoro sits on the board of directors of Access Bank Plc., and chairs the board's Remuneration Committee and Governance & Nomination Committee. He is a director of PZ Cussons Plc, and chairs the People & Governance Committee of the PZ Cussons Plc Board. He is a council member of the International Bar Association.

As an expert in the communication industry, he drafted the Nigerian Communications Act 2003, that regulates the Nigeria Communications industry and also drafted the Nigerian Communications (Enforcement Process etc.) Regulations, 2005 as well as the Mobile Number Portability Regulations 2014.

He was elected as the 29th Nigerian Bar Association president in 2018.

== Personal life ==
He is married to Mrs Mfon Usoro who is the pioneer Director-General of Nigerian Maritime Administration and Safety Agency (NIMASA) from August 2006 to May 2007 and Non executive director to First City monument Bank. They have two children.

== See also ==
- List of Nigerian jurists
