= Mudiaga Odje =

Nigerian lawyer

Mudiaga Odje (25 September 1923 – 9 December 2005) was a Nigerian lawyer and Senior Advocate of Nigeria. He served as president of the Nigerian Bar Association from 1974 to 1976 and later chaired the Nigerian Body of Benchers from 1996 to 1997. He also served on constitutional and human-rights bodies and appeared in several significant Nigerian constitutional and customary-law cases.

== Early life ==
He returned to Nigeria in July 1961, but went back to London three years later to complete his doctoral programme.

== Landmark cases ==
Odje handled very contentious cases up to the Supreme Court on the Law of Succession under Urhobo, Itsekiri and Benin Native Laws and Customs. Some of these cases include:

(i) Thompson Oke & Anor V Robinson Oke and Anor (1974) 1 ALL NLR 443

(ii) Idehen V Idehen (1991) 6 NWLR (pt 198) 382

(iii) Agidigbi V Agidigbi (1996) 6 NWLR (pt 454) 300

Odje was the lead Counsel in the case wherein the first impeachment of a sitting Governor in Nigerian Legal History, Alhaji Balarabe Musa of Kaduna State was successfully conducted and upheld by the Court (Alhaji Balarabe Musa V Auta Hamza and 6ors 1982 3NCLR 229). Odje was also included in the significant constitutional precedent that validated the elections of President Shehu Shagari by the Supreme Court of Nigeria in 1979 in the case of Chief Obafemi Awolowo V Alhaji Shehu Shagari 1979 ALL NLR 120 In the spirit of protecting the Ethnic Nationalities of Nigeria, and their natural resources, Odje successfully protected the riparian rights of fishermen from expropriation by the Federal Government of Nigeria in the case of Elf V Sillo (1994) 6 NWLR (Pt356) 258. On constitutional law, and the right of freedom of movement in Nigeria, Dr. Odje handled the locus classicus of Federal Ministry of Internal Affairs V Shugaba (1982) NCLR 915.

Odje was one of the only and foremost lawyers to successfully persuade the Supreme Court of Nigeria to overrule itself on its previous decision and accept his contention as the new and correct position of the Law. This legal accomplishment has been reported in the cases of Esewe V Gbe (1988) 5 NWLR (Pt 93) 134 which was overruled in Orubu V National Electoral Commission & 13 Ors (1988) 5 NWLR (Pt94) 323.

== National honours ==
Odje became a member of the Body of Benchers and a LIFE Bencher on 30 March 1989. He was also chairman of numerous bodies and committees, including;

- Chairman – Honorable BODY OF BENCHERS from 1996 – 1997.
- Chairman – Federal Government Commission for in-depth study of the Nigeria/Benin Republic boundary dispute, including the maritime sector from 1989 and 1990.
- Chairman – Delta State Committee on Review of Civil Procedure 2004.
- Chairman – Delta State Legal Team/Committee on the Resource Control Case at the Supreme Court now reported as AG of Fed VAG Abia 2002 6 NWLR (pt 764) 54
