= Okey Wali =

Nigerian lawyer

President of the Nigerian Bar Association
- In office July 2012 – July 2014
- Preceded by: Joseph Bodurin Daudu
- Succeeded by: Augustine Alegeh (SAN)

Personal details
- Born: 29 October 1958 Rumualogu, Obio-Akpor, Rivers State, Nigeria

Okey Wali, SAN (born October 29, 1958) is a Nigerian lawyer and the 26th president of the Nigerian Bar Association.

== Early life ==
Wali was born on October 29, 1958, at Rumualogu Town in Akpor Kingdom of Obio-Akpor local government area in the metropolis of Port Harcourt, a southern part of Nigeria. He attended the Port Harcourt Township School for his primary education but completed it at St. Paul’s Primary School in Diobu, Port Harcourt. He later attended Baptist High School, Port Harcourt, where he obtained the West African School Certificate in 1973 and proceeded to the University of Buckingham, United Kingdom, where he received a Bachelor of Law degree in 1983. He returned to Nigeria for professional training at the Nigerian Law School in Lagos State and was called to the Nigerian Bar in 1984.

== Law career ==
He was called to the Nigerian Bar in 1984. After few years of working experience, he was appointed as secretary of Port Harcourt branch of the NBA in 1992. He later served as the Attorney-General and Commissioner for Justice of Rivers State before he was elected as the 26th president of the Nigerian Bar Association, having polled 688 votes to defeat Emeka Ngige (SAN), who had 449 votes. He was succeeded by Augustine Alegeh, a senior advocate of Nigeria.

== Controversy ==
In October 2014, it was reported that Wali was abducted in Rumualogu Town, Akpor City, Rivers State by unknown gunmen and released a few days after the abduction.
