= Richard Akinjide =

Nigerian lawyer and politician (1930–2020)

The Honourable Chief Richard Akinjide SAN

Minister of Education
- In office 1965 – 15 January 1966
- Prime Minister: Abubakar Tafawa Balewa

Attorney General of Nigeria
- In office 1979–1983
- President: Shehu Shagari

Personal details
- Born: Osuolale Abimbola Richard Akinjide; 4 November 1930 Ibadan, Western Region, British Nigeria (now Ibadan, Oyo State, Nigeria)
- Died: 21 April 2020 (aged 89) Ibadan, Oyo State, Nigeria
- Occupation: Politician; Lawyer

Chief Osuolale Abimbola Richard Akinjide, // SAN (4 November 1930 – 21 April 2020) was a Nigerian lawyer and politician. He served as the minister of education in the First Republic and the minister of justice in the Second Republic.

== Biography ==
Born in Ibadan in 1930, Chief Akinjide belonged to a family with links to the Nigerian chieftaincy system: his maternal grandfather was Chief Oderinlo, a Balogun of the Ibadan kingdom. He attended Oduduwa College in Ile-Ife as a young boy, and subsequently passed out in Grade One (Distinction, Aggregate 6).

Akinjide travelled to the UK in 1951 for his higher education and was called to the English Bar in 1955. He later returned to Nigeria. He established his practice of Akinjide & Co soon thereafter.

He was the minister of education in the government of Prime Minister Tafawa Balewa during the First Republic and the Minister for Justice in the administration of President Shehu Shagari in the Second Republic. He was a member of the judicial system's sub-committee of the Constitutional Drafting Committee of 1975-1977 and later joined the National Party of Nigeria in 1978. He became the legal adviser for the party and was later appointed the Minister for Justice.

Akinjide was a Senior Advocate of Nigeria.

In addition to being a member of the Oderinlo chieftaincy family, he also himself served as a chieftain in the Olubadan of Ibadan's court of clan nobles.

== Attorney General ==
It was under his watch that Nigeria temporarily reversed executions of armed robbers. The abolition of a decree barring exiles from returning to the country. He was lead prosecutor in the treason trial of Bukar Zanna Mandara. The eviction of many illegal foreign nationals from Nigeria which contributed to mild violence against some foreigners in the country. The event also exposed some weaknesses within the West African economic community.
