= Institute for Peace and Conflict Resolution Nigeria =

Body responsible for promoting peace and preventing conflict

Agency overview
- Formed: 2000
- Jurisdiction: Federal Government of Nigeria
- Headquarters: Plot 496, Abogo Largema Street, off Constitution Avenue, CBD, Abuja
- Minister responsible: Yusuf Tuggar
- Agency executives: Sunusi Musa, SAN, Chairman; Dr Joseph Ochogwu, Director General
- Website: https://ipcr.gov.ng/

The Institute for Peace and Conflict Resolution (IPCR Nigeria) is a Nigerian government agency under the Federal Ministry of Foreign Affairs, established in February 2000 to promote peace, conflict prevention, and resolution across Nigeria and the African continent. It serves as a national think tank and policy advisory body on peacebuilding, conflict management, and democratic governance.

== History ==
IPCR was originally created under the Ministry of Cooperation and Integration in Africa but was later repositioned under the Ministry of Foreign Affairs to align its mandate with Nigeria’s foreign policy and regional peace efforts. Its establishment was part of Nigeria’s broader strategy to institutionalize peacebuilding and conflict resolution mechanisms in response to internal and regional conflicts.

== Mandate and objectives ==
The institute’s core objectives include:

- Conducting research on peace and conflict issues
- Advising government and stakeholders on policy options
- Building capacity for peacebuilding and conflict resolution
- Facilitating dialogue and reconciliation in conflict-prone areas
- Promoting a culture of peace through education and advocacy

== Activities ==
IPCR engages in a wide range of activities, such as:

- Research and Publications: Producing policy briefs, reports, and academic studies on peace and conflict dynamics.
- Training and Capacity Building: Organizing workshops and seminars for civil society, security agencies, and government officials.
- Direct Interventions: Mediating in communal, ethnic, and political conflicts across Nigeria.
- Advocacy and Outreach: Promoting peace education and public awareness campaigns.

== National, regional and international engagement ==
IPCR has participated in peacebuilding initiatives across West Africa and the Sahel, including collaborations with ECOWAS, the African Union, and the United Nations. It has also hosted international conferences and partnered with global institutions on research and training.

In December 2025, IPCR Nigeria partnered with global peace ambassador Zubairu Dalhatu Malami to launch a multi‑stakeholder initiative to promote peace, unity, and community resilience across the 19 Northern States in Nigeria and the FCT, titled 2026 Northern Nigeria Peace Campaign. The campaign was coordinated by the Africa Peace Reform Initiative (APRI) in partnership with the Global Peace Chain, AUDA‑NEPAD Nigeria, and Zamkah Technologies Limited.

== Headquarters ==
The institute is headquartered in Abuja, Nigeria’s capital, and operates through zonal offices across Nigeria’s six geopolitical regions.

== Leadership ==
The institute is led by a director-general appointed by the president of Nigeria. The leadership team includes directors of research, training, and outreach, supported by multidisciplinary staff.
