= Nigerian Law School =

Institute for law courses in Nigeria legal practitioner

- Established: 1962
- School type: Law school
- Dean: Dr. Olugbemisola Odusote, director- general
- Location: Bwari, Abuja, Nigeria
- Bar pass rate: Bar pass II
- Website: www.nigerianlawschool.edu.ng

The Nigerian Law School is an educational institution set up to provide professional certification to graduates of law. The school was established in Lagos under the Legal Education Act 1962, now Legal Education (Consolidation Etc) Act Cap. L10, Laws of the Federation, 2004. Until the school was established, legal practitioners in Nigeria had received the requisite training in England and had been called to the English Bar.

== Curriculum ==
The Law School offers course in criminal and civil litigation, property and corporate law, as well as a course in ethics. Over 70,000 students have graduated from the Nigerian Law School since its inception in 1962. Anyone who has obtained a university degree in law and wants to practice as a lawyer in Nigeria, must attend the Nigerian Law School. The Council of Legal Education gives certificates to students who pass the Bar Part II examinations, and these students are then called to the Bar. In Nigeria, several universities offer Law programmes. Knowing these institutions can help prospective students explore their options when considering where to study Law.

== Locations ==
Its campus in Lagos was set up in 1962, moving to its current location in 1969. Between its founding and 1969, it was based at a temporary location on Igbosere Road in the Lagos Island district. The law school headquarters was relocated to Abuja in 1997. The Nigerian Law School currently has 7 campuses - one in each geopolitical region of the country, though the Nigerian Senate has approved the establishment of seven new campuses.

- Lagos Campus (South-West) - Ozumba Mbadiwe Street Victoria Island, Lagos. Established in 1962.
- Abuja Campus (North-Central) - Bwari, Abuja. Established in 1997.
- Enugu Campus (South-East) - Agbani Road, Enugu. Established in 1997.
- Kano Campus (North-West) - Bagauda, Kano. Established in 2021.
- Yola Campus (North-East) - Jimeta, Yola, Adamawa. Established in 2011.
- Bayelsa Campus (South-South) - Yenagoa, Bayelsa. Established in 2011.
- Port Harcourt Campus (South-South) - Port Harcourt, Rivers State. Established in 2008.
- Kabba Campus (North-Central) - Kabba, Kogi State. IN DEVELOPMENT.
- Jos Campus (North-Central) - Jos, Plateau State. IN DEVELOPMENT.
- Maiduguri Campus (North-East) - Maiduguri, Borno State. IN DEVELOPMENT.
- Argungu Campus (North-West) - Argungu, Kebbi State. IN DEVELOPMENT.
- Okija Campus (South-East) - Okija, Anambra State. IN DEVELOPMENT.
- Orogun Campus (South-South) - Orogun, Delta State. IN DEVELOPMENT.
- Ilawe Campus (South-West) - Ilawe, Ekiti State. IN DEVELOPMENT.

== Notable alumni ==
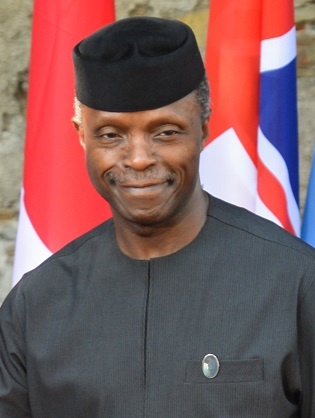
Yemi Osinbajo, Vice President of Nigeria

- Yemi Osinbajo, Vice President of Nigeria (2015-2023)
- Abdullahi Adamu, governor of Nasarawa State
- Senator Godswill Akpabio, governor of Akwa Ibom State
- Issifu Omoro Tanko Amadu, justice of the Supreme Court of Ghana
- Sullivan Chime, governor of Enugu State
- Kayode Ajulo - Administrator, Arbitrator, Lawyer
- Solomon Dalung, Minister of Youth and Sports
- Oladipo Diya, Chief of General Staff
- Donald Duke, governor of Cross River State
- Kanayo O. Kanayo, actor
- Alex Ekwueme, first elected Vice President of Nigeria
- Abba Kyari, Chief of Staff to President Muhammadu Buhari from 2015 to 2020
- Simon Lalong, governor of Plateau State
- Tahir Mamman, professor of law, Senior Advocate of Nigeria (SAN) and director-general of Nigeria Law School from 2005 to 2013
- Richard Mofe-Damijo, actor
- Lai Mohammed, Minister of Information
- Mary Odili, Justice of the Supreme Court of Nigeria and former First Lady of Rivers State
- Bianca Ojukwu, Nigerian ambassador to Spain
- Chris Okewulonu, Chief of Staff to Imo State Government
- Kenneth Okonkwo, actor
- Tim Owhefere, Nigerian politician
- Umaru Shinkafi, Federal Commissioner of Internal Affairs
- Gabriel Suswam, governor of Benue State
- Edwin Ume-Ezeoke, Speaker of the Nigerian House of Representatives during the Second Republic
- Oyinkansola "foza" Fawehinmi, Entertainment Lawyer.
- Ebuka Obi-Uchendu, Nigerian Media Personality.
- Femi Falana, Senior Advocate Nigeria, Nigerian Lawyer and human rights activist.
- Falz (Folarin Falana), Nigerian rapper, songwriter and actor.
- Femi Fani-Kayode, Nigerian aristocrat, lawyer, writer, diplomat and poet.
- Cynthia Nwadiora (CeeC), Nigerian lawyer, actress, model and reality television personality.

== News ==
In August 2009, a legal practitioner Asbayir Abubakar called for reductions in the fees paid at the Nigerian Law School in order to accommodate the less privileged into the legal profession. In November 2009, the Director-General of the Nigerian Law School, Prof Tahir Mamman SAN, said that students who passed through unauthorized law faculties would not be admitted into the Nigerian Law School. He said the Council of Legal Education will refer law Professors and teachers managing illegal law faculties to the disciplinary committee of the Body of Benchers. This is why Prof Tahir Mamman SAN is referred to as the most successful Director General since the inception of the institution. Mr O. A. Onadeko the previous Deputy Director General of the Lagos Campus served as the Director General of the Nigerian Law School from 2013 to 2018. In February 2018 Prof. Isa Chiroma was appointed as the new Director General

The Nigeria Law School is one of the most prestigious and credible institutions in Nigeria.

Olugbemisola Titilayo Odusote was appointed Director‑General with effect from 10 January 2026, becoming the first woman to lead the institution.

== See also ==
- Lists of law schools
