= Federal Ministry of Justice (Nigeria) =

Legal arms ministry Nigeria

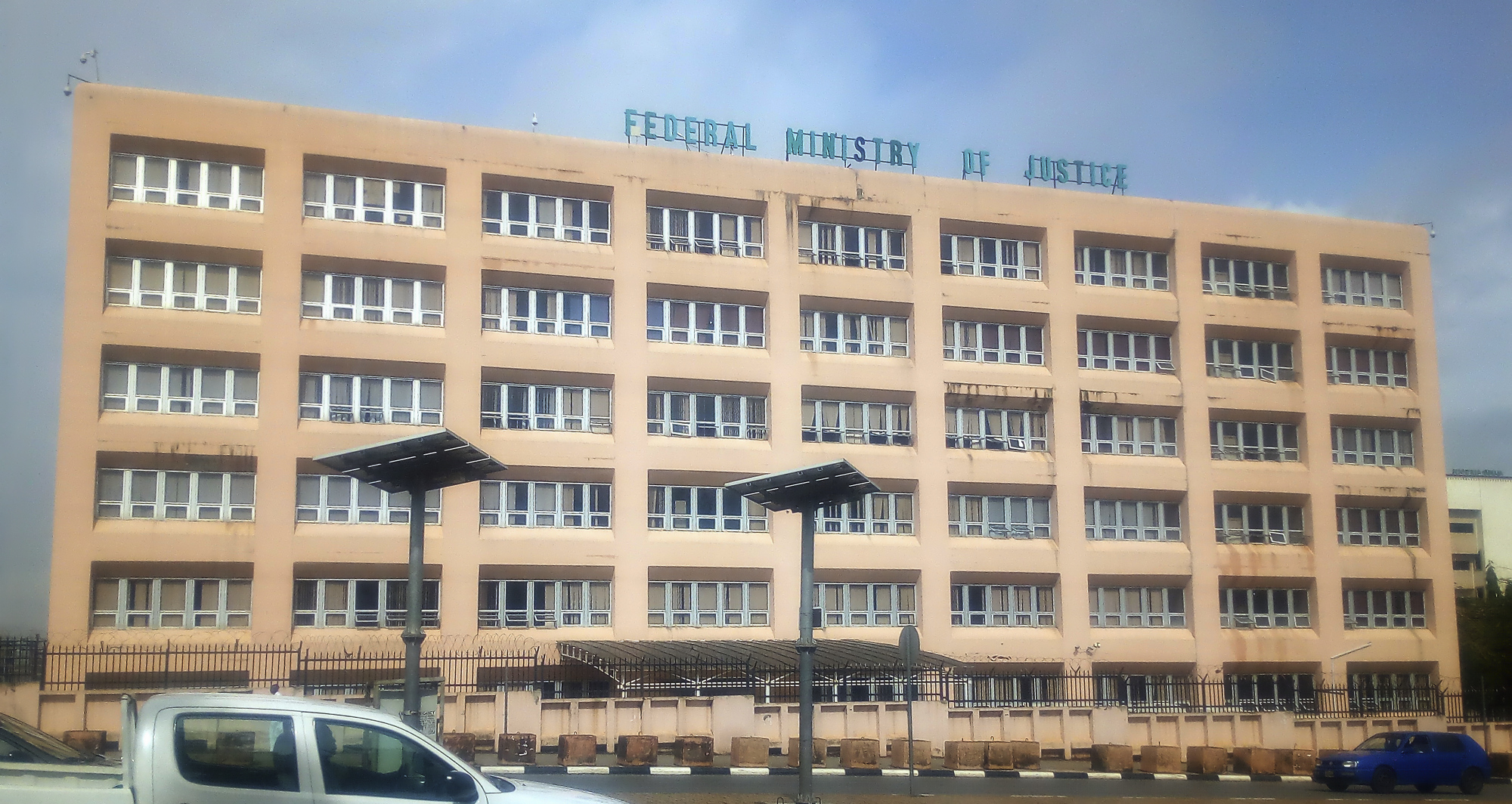
Federal Ministry of Justice headquarters in Abuja

The Federal Ministry of Justice is the legal arm of the Federal Government of Nigeria, primarily concerned with bringing cases before the judiciary that are initiated or assumed by the government. The headquarters of the organisation are located in the Maitama District, Abuja.

== Organisation ==
It is headed by the Attorney General of the Federation who also serves as the Minister of Justice. The Attorney General is appointed by the President, and is assisted by a Permanent Secretary, who is a career civil servant. As of August 2023, the Attorney General is Lateef Fagbemi.

=== Core Internal Departments ===
These operational departments run the day-to-day legal, prosecutorial, and administrative advisory functions of the Federal Government:

- Department of Public Prosecutions (DPP): Prosecutes federal crimes (terrorism, cybercrime, economic crimes) and issues legal advice to law enforcement.
- Department of Civil Litigation: Acts as the government’s defense lawyers in civil lawsuits and constitutional challenges to protect the state from financial liabilities.
- Department of Legal Drafting: Translates government policy into precise statutory language by drafting executive bills, regulations, and executive orders.
- Department of Solicitors: Vets and negotiates major government contracts, loans, and joint ventures; handles commercial arbitration.
- Department of International and Comparative Law: Manages international treaties, extradition requests, and mutual legal assistance with foreign nations.
- Department of Citizens' Rights: Resolves public complaints regarding human rights abuses and state injustice using mediation and Alternative Dispute Resolution (ADR).
- Department of Law Reporting: Compiles and publishes official judicial precedents and landmark court judgments for legal research.
- Department of Planning, Research and Statistics (PRS): Coordinates justice sector policies, tracks performance data, and monitors capital projects.
- Department of Finance and Administration: Manages internal budgeting, disbursements, financial statements, and compliance with fiscal regulations.
- Department of Human Resource Management: Handles staff recruitment, career promotions, regional postings, and continuous professional training.
- Department of Procurement: Oversees the purchasing of goods, equipment, and services in compliance with federal bidding laws.

=== Statutory Agencies, Boards, and Commissions ===
These are distinct legal entities or parastatals that operate under the strategic oversight or reporting framework of the Ministry of Justice:

- National Agency for the Prohibition of Trafficking in Persons (NAPTIP): Nigeria's primary agency tasked with combating human trafficking, enforcing anti-trafficking laws, and rehabilitating victims.
- National Drug Law Enforcement Agency (NDLEA): The specialized agency responsible for cutting off the supply of illicit drugs, controlling manufacturing, and suppressing drug trafficking.
- Legal Aid Council of Nigeria (LACON): Charged with providing free legal criminal defense, advice, and representation to indigent (low-income) Nigerian citizens.
- Nigerian Law Reform Commission (NLRC): Formally reviews and continuously researches laws in Nigeria to propose modernizations, codifications, or repeals.
- Council of Legal Education (Nigerian Law School): Oversees vocational legal training, running the various campuses of the Nigerian Law School and administering bar exams.
- Nigerian Copyright Commission (NCC): Protects, regulates, and administers copyright laws for creative, literary, and musical works across the nation.
- Regional Centre for International Commercial Arbitration (RCICAL): An autonomous, international organization under the ministry's umbrella providing alternative dispute resolution frameworks within the West African region.

== See also ==
- Politics of Nigeria
- Federal Ministries of Nigeria
- Justice ministry
- Nigerian Civil Service
