= Nigerian Bar Association =

Nigerian Law Organization

- Type: Professional Association
- Location: Federal Capital Territory, Abuja
- Official language: English
- President: Oyinkansola Badejo-Okusanya, SAN
- General Secretary: Afam O. Okeke
- Website: www.nigerianbar.org.ng

The Nigerian Bar Association (NBA) is a non-profit, umbrella professional association of lawyers admitted to the Bar by the Council of Legal Education in Nigeria. It is engaged in the promotion and protection of human rights, the rule of law and good governance. The NBA has an observer status with the African Commission on Human and People's Rights, and a working partnership with many national and international non-governmental organizations concerned with similar goals in Nigeria and in Africa.

The NBA is made up of 141 branches, three professional sections, two specialized institutes, and six practice-cadre forums.

Its National Secretariat is managed from Abuja. Its organizational structure comprises a National Executive Council, a National Officers/Management Board, sections, forums, committees, working groups and a National Secretariat with 54 staff as at June 2024.

The president of the Nigerian Bar Association is Afam Osigwe, SAN and the General Secretary is Dr. Mobolaji Ojibara.

== See also ==
- Nigerian Body of Benchers
