= Senior Advocate of Nigeria =

Legal practitioner title in Nigeria

Senior Advocate of Nigeria (SAN) is a honorific title that is conferred on legal practitioners in Nigeria of not less than ten years' standing and who have distinguished themselves in the legal profession. It is the equivalent of the rank of King's Counsel in the United Kingdom, as well as in South Australia, the Northern Territory, and Canada (except Quebec). Several countries use similar designations such as Senior Counsel, President's Counsel, State Counsel, Senior Advocate, and President's Advocate. A senior advocate of Nigeria is said to have been admitted to the "Inner Bar", as distinguished from the "Outer", or "Utter", Bar, consisting of junior advocates (See Call to the bar).

The conferment is made in accordance with the Legal Practitioners Act 207 Section 5 (1) by the Legal Practitioners' Privileges Committee, headed by the chief justice (as chairman), and consist of the attorney general, one justice of the Supreme Court (chosen by the chief justice and the attorney general for a term of two years, renewable on one occasion only), the president of the Court of Appeal, five of the chief judges of the states (chosen by the chief justice and the attorney general for a term of two years, renewable on one occasion only), the chief judge of the Federal High Court, and five legal practitioners who are senior advocates of Nigeria (chosen by the chief justice and the attorney general for a term of two years, renewable on one occasion only).

The title was first conferred on 3 April 1975. The recipients were Chief F.R.A. Williams and Dr Nabo Graham-Douglas. As of 7 July, 2011 344 lawyers had become Senior Advocates of Nigeria. Chief (Mrs.) Folake Solanke is the first female recipient of the rank of SAN, which was awarded to her in 1981.

A notable mention is Chief Henry Theodore Okeade Coker (H.T.O. Coker) who was conferred as a SAN in 1982 with serial number 32. H.T.O. Coker is the younger brother of High Chief Hon. Justice (Dr) G.B.A. Coker, Justice of the Supreme Court of Nigeria from 1964 to 1975. G.B.A. Coker was appointed by Dr. Moses Majekodunmi to head the investigation into Chief Obafemi Awolowo and the Action Group, leading to Awolowo's imprisonment.

Since 1975, a varying number of advocates in Nigeria have consecutively been conferred with the rank, with the exception of 1976, 1977 and 1994. The conferment is however restricted to fewer than 30 advocates per annum and is made by the chief justice of Nigeria on the recommendations of the Legal Practitioners' Privileges Committee. In 2023, Kayode Ajulo, a renowned lawyer and rights activist heralded other 57 lawyers to be conferred with the prestigious title. In 2024 Mofesomo Tayo-Oyetibo was conferred with the rank of SAN at 34 years of age. In 2025, Abdulakeem Labi-Lawal was also elevated to the rank of SAN along with 56 other eminent legal practitioners.

As of May 2022, a total of 693 lawyers have been awarded the title since its inception in 1975.
