= Bolaji =

- Language: Yoruba

Origin
- Meaning: Wakes with wealth
- Region of origin: West Africa

Bolaji is a Yoruba given name and surname meaning "Wakes with wealth". Notable people with the surname include:

Given name

- Bolaji Abdullahi, Nigerian politician
- Bolaji Akinyemi, Nigerian professor of political science who was Nigerian External Affairs Minister from 1985 to late 1987
- Bolaji Aluko, Nigerian academic
- Bolaji Amusan, Nigerian actor
- Bolaji Ayinla, Nigerian politician
- Bolaji Badejo, Nigerian visual artist and actor
- Bolaji Dada, Nigerian politician
- Bolaji Idowu, Nigerian cleric
- Bolaji Odofin, Nigerian playwright
- Bolaji Ogunmola, Nigerian actress
- Bolaji Owasanoye, Nigerian lawyer, human rights activist and chairman of Independent Corrupt Practices Commission
- Bolaji Ramos, Nigerian writer
- Bolaji Sakin, Nigerian football

Surname

- Adebayo Bolaji, Nigerian painter, actor, writer and director
- Mariam Eniola Bolaji (born 2005), Nigerian para-badminton player
- Omoseye Bolaji, Nigerian writer
