= Lagelu Grammar School =

Public Secondary School in Ibadan, Oyo State, Nigeria

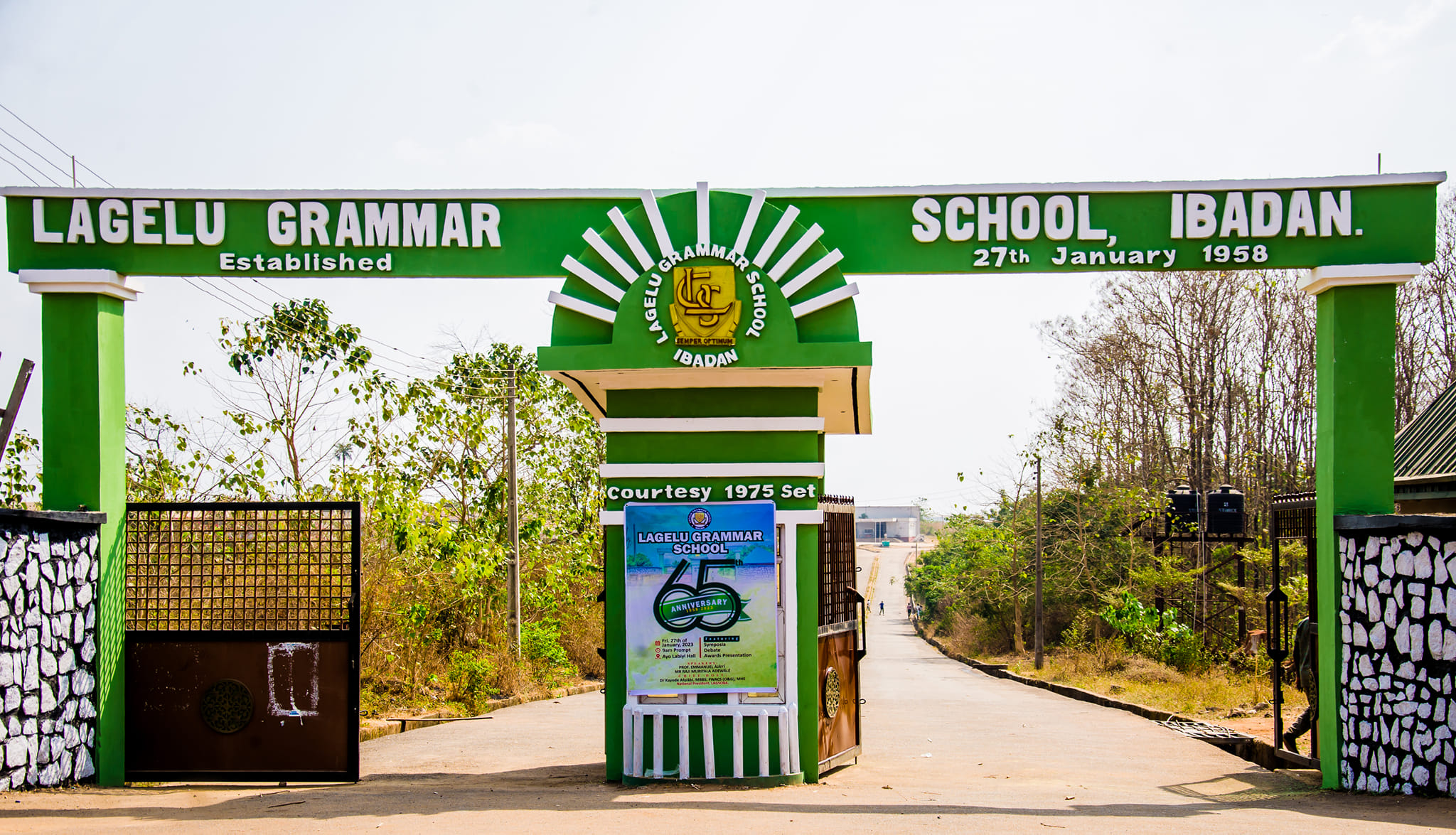
- The school's main gate photographed in 2023

Location
- Oremeji-Agugu Road; P.M.B. 5066, Dugbe; Ibadan, Oyo State, 200235; Nigeria; 7°22′53.8″N 3°55′34.9″E

Information
- Type: Public Secondary School
- Motto: Latin: Semper Optimum (Always the Best)
- Established: 27 January 1958; 68 years ago
- Founder: Ibadan District Council
- Local authority: Ibadan North-East LG.
- Current Principal: Unknown
- Founding Principal: Chief Ayo Labiyi
- Age: 10 to 18
- Enrollment: Approx. 1,500 (2023)
- Campus size: 25 acres
- Campus type: Urban Day School
- Houses: 4
- Colours: White and Green
- Song: "Who are Students Bright and Gay"
- Newspaper: Optimus
- Affiliations: Oyo State Ministry of Education
- Alumni: Lagelu Grammar School Old Boys Association (LAGSOBA)

Lagelu Grammar School is a public Secondary School located in the Agugu area of Ibadan, Oyo State, Nigeria. Established on 27 January 1958 as a boys-only institution by the defunct Ibadan District Council, it is recognised as one of the oldest public grammar schools in Ibadan, and has produced two Governors of Oyo State. The school transitioned to co-educational status in the mid-1970s. The school is named in honour of the legendary ancestor, Lagelu, the founder of Ibadan. The school's motto is the Latin phrase Semper Optimum (English: "Always the Best").

The institution operates an urban day campus of approximately 25 acres in the Oremeji Agugu neighbourhood, primarily serving day pupils. Lagelu Grammar School has maintained a strong reputation for academic resilience and community engagement, serving as a key educational institution in the Oyo State public school system, with its infrastructure largely maintained by its active alumni association.

== Namesake ==
The school is named after the legendary ancestor, Lagelu, a military generalissimo from Ile-Ife widely recognised as the founder of the original settlement of Ibadan in the 17th or 18th century.

Lagelu is associated with the epithet Oro a pata maja ("The potent word that cuts like a razor blade"). This epithet symbolically represents a powerful and legendary figure who embodies the spirit and bravery of the Yoruba people. His legacy is closely tied to the history of the city, including the founding of the initial settlements, and is celebrated through the annual Oke Badan Festival.

== History ==
=== Founding and Early Years (1958–1970) ===
Lagelu Grammar School was founded on 27 January 1958 with an initial grant from the Ibadan District Council, a local government body in the former Western Region of Nigeria. The school's establishment was part of a major educational expansion programme aimed at broadening access to post-primary education.

Operations commenced at a temporary site within the Agugu District Council Primary School with an initial cohort of 33 male pupils. The founding principal, Chief Ayo Labiyi, an accomplished educationist, led the school from 1958 until 1968. He is credited with coining the school's motto, Semper Optimum. The permanent 25-acre campus in Oremeji Agugu was generously donated by the Mato family of the Kobomojo area, with the campus structures completed around 1960.

=== Transition and Growth ===
The school transitioned to a co-educational institution in the mid-1970s, aligning with national policies promoting gender-inclusive education. Throughout the 1980s, the school’s enrollment expanded significantly, serving thousands of pupils from across Ibadan and surrounding areas. Its academic reputation was solidified by a consistent record of graduates gaining admission to highly competitive tertiary institutions, including the University of Ibadan and Obafemi Awolowo University.

=== Anniversaries and Modern Development ===
The school has regularly marked its heritage with significant anniversaries, which are often spearheaded by the alumni association. The 60th Anniversary in 2018 featured the launch of a major infrastructure rehabilitation campaign, which included a courtesy visit to the Olubadan of Ibadan. The 65th Anniversary in 2023 included academic events such as a schools' debate, a symposium, and a keynote lecture by Professor Emmanuel Ajala of the University of Ibadan.

== Campus and Facilities ==
The school’s 25-acre campus is located along Agugu Road in the Oremeji Agugu neighbourhood. It features several named academic blocks and recreational areas.

=== Infrastructure and Alumni Projects ===
The Lagelu Grammar School Old Boys Association (LAGSOBA) has been consistently active in infrastructure development, notably undertaking a major refurbishment campaign around the school's 60th Anniversary in 2018, which saw over ₦200 million injected into upgrading facilities. This commitment has continued in recent years through contributions from various alumni sets.

Key alumni-funded facilities include:

- The Ayo Labiyi Hall: A reconstructed, multi-purpose school hall dedicated to the school’s founding principal.
- The Osuntokun eLibrary: A fully equipped modern electronic library.
- Science and Computer Laboratories: Comprehensive renovation of the physics, chemistry, and biology labs was completed in 2018. In 2024, the 1983 Set completed a significant project that refurbished a building housing the examination hall, staff room, and laboratories, and provided new chairs and desks. Alumni sets have also provided essential laboratory equipment and computer units.
- Sanitation: Provision of new boreholes and modern toilet facilities, commissioned by the 1983 set in 2020 to improve hygiene and welfare.

== School Life ==
=== Academics and Curriculum ===
Lagelu Grammar School adheres to the national 6-3-3-4 educational system, operating a three-year Junior Secondary School (JSS 1–3) and a three-year Senior Secondary School (SSS 1–3). The Oyo State Ministry of Education fully regulates the curriculum. It is structured in alignment with the standards set by the Nigerian Educational Research and Development Council (NERDC). It prepares pupils for the West African Senior School Certificate Examination (WASSCE) and the National Examination Council (NECO) examinations, focusing on the sciences, arts, and vocational subjects.

==== Junior Secondary Curriculum (JSS 1–3) ====
The curriculum at the Junior level (JSS 1–3) serves as a compulsory basic education phase focusing on foundational literacy, numeracy, and pre-vocational skills. Pupils typically study between 12 and 14 subjects, including:

- English Studies
- General Mathematics
- Nigerian Languages (Yoruba is the regional language)
- Basic Science and Technology (integrated Basic Science, Basic Technology, Information Technology, and Physical & Health Education)
- Social & Citizenship Studies
- Cultural and Creative Arts (CCA)
- Business Studies
- Agricultural Science
- Religious Studies (Christian Religious Studies or Islamic Studies)

==== Senior Secondary Specialisation (SSS 1–3) ====
In the Senior Secondary phase (SSS 1–3), pupils specialise in a career-focused stream, usually starting from SSS 1. Candidates for the WASSCE and NECO exams are required to offer a minimum of eight and a maximum of nine subjects, a structure mandated by the examination bodies and the national educational policy.

===== Core and Compulsory Subjects =====
All SSS pupils, irrespective of their specialisation stream, must offer five core, cross-cutting subjects:

- English Language
- General Mathematics
- Civic Education
- Digital Technologies (or Computer Studies/ICT)
- One Trade/Entrepreneurship subject (as mandated by the government)

===== Specialisation Streams and Subject Combinations =====
Pupils then select 3 or 4 additional subjects from their chosen field of specialisation. The school offers four primary streams:

Senior Secondary School Specialisation Streams
Specialisation Stream	Key Subject Groupings (Compulsory for the Stream)	Common Elective Subjects
Science	Physics, Chemistry, Biology, Further Mathematics (often taken by high-achieving pupils)	Agricultural Science, Geography, Technical Drawing, Food & Nutrition
Technical/Technology	Physics, Technical Drawing, Further Mathematics	Chemistry, Computer Studies, Data Processing, Metalwork, Woodwork
Commercial / Business Studies	Financial Accounting, Commerce, Economics	Government, Literature-in-English, Geography, Agricultural Science
Arts / Humanities	Literature-in-English, Government, History	One Nigerian Language (Yoruba), French, Christian Religious Studies (CRS), Islamic Studies (IS), Visual Arts

The Technical/Technology stream is specifically designed to blend scientific principles (Physics, Further Mathematics) with technical and practical vocational skills (Technical Drawing, Trade Subjects) to effectively prepare pupils for engineering and technology-based careers, reflecting the national focus on STEAM (Science, Technology, Engineering, Arts, and Mathematics) education.

The Lagelu Grammar School Old Boys Association (LAGSOBA) regularly provides financial support, including scholarships and the payment of NECO examination fees for financially disadvantaged pupils, ensuring that all pupils have the opportunity to complete their certification. Furthermore, the donation of the Osuntokun eLibrary and the comprehensive renovation of Science and Computer Laboratories directly support learning in the core academic fields.

=== Competitive Activities and Achievements ===
The school's anniversary celebrations often feature competitive schools' debates, lectures, symposia, and cultural displays.

The school publishes its annual magazine, Optimus, which serves as a record of school activities and achievements.

== School Anthem ==
The official school anthem is:

Stanza 1
Who are students bright and gay
Here they are in Lagelu
Diligent and Disciplined
Here they are in Lagelu

Chorus
Wherever I go, whatever I be
I always uphold your name
Hold you near, Hold you there
To my heart, Lagelu

Stanza 2
In classroom work, in field of play
Social life and everything
Lazy drones, cheats and idlers
Have no room in Lagelu

== Governance and Affiliation ==
Lagelu Grammar School is a public secondary school operating under the direct authority of the Oyo State Ministry of Education. While the state government manages staffing and overall policy, the School Governing Board (SGB) works in close partnership with the Old Boys Association (LAGSOBA) to oversee local development, maintenance, and welfare initiatives.

=== Notable Former Pupils (Lagelites) ===
- Ayobami Salami – Former Deputy Vice-Chancellor Academic at Obafemi Awolowo University and the pioneer Vice-Chancellor of the Abiola Ajimobi Technical University.
- Abiola Ajimobi (1949–2020) – Former Governor of Oyo State (2011–2019).
- Adebayo Adelabu – Former Deputy Governor of the Central Bank of Nigeria (2014–2018) and current Minister of Power of the Federal Republic of Nigeria (2023–present).
- Adesoji Akanbi – Former Senator who represented Oyo South in the Senate.
- Abdul-Azeez Arisekola Alao – (Late) business mogul and former Aare Musulumi of Yorubaland.
- Bolaji Owasanoye – Prominent academic and the current Chairman of the Independent Corrupt Practices Commission.
- Abisoye Fagade – Entrepreneur, Brand Strategist, and current Director General of the National Institute for Hospitality and Tourism (NIHOTOUR).
- Kase Lawal – International businessman and CEO of the CAMAC International Corporation and Erin Energy Corporation.
- Omoseye Bolaji – Nigerian-born South African author, known for his crime fiction work.
- Abbey Akinoshun – Philanthropist, nursing advocate in the UK, and founder of the Dr Abbey Akinoshun Foundation (DAAF).
- Dr. Segun Osifeso – Distinguished engineer and surveyor; recipient of the GDLE Award.
- Ishmael Olalekan-Alli – Former Secretary to the State Government (SSG) of Oyo State.
- Waheed Akin Olajide – Former Secretary to the State Government (SSG) of Oyo State.

== See also ==
- Education in Nigeria
- List of schools in Nigeria
- Oyo State
