= Mustapha Akanbi =

Mustapha Akanbi may refer to:

- Mustapha Akanbi (jurist) (1938–2018), Nigerian jurist
- Mustapha Akanbi (academic) (1971–2022), Nigerian academic and lawyer
