= Bukhari Bello =

Nigerian lawyer and human rights advocate

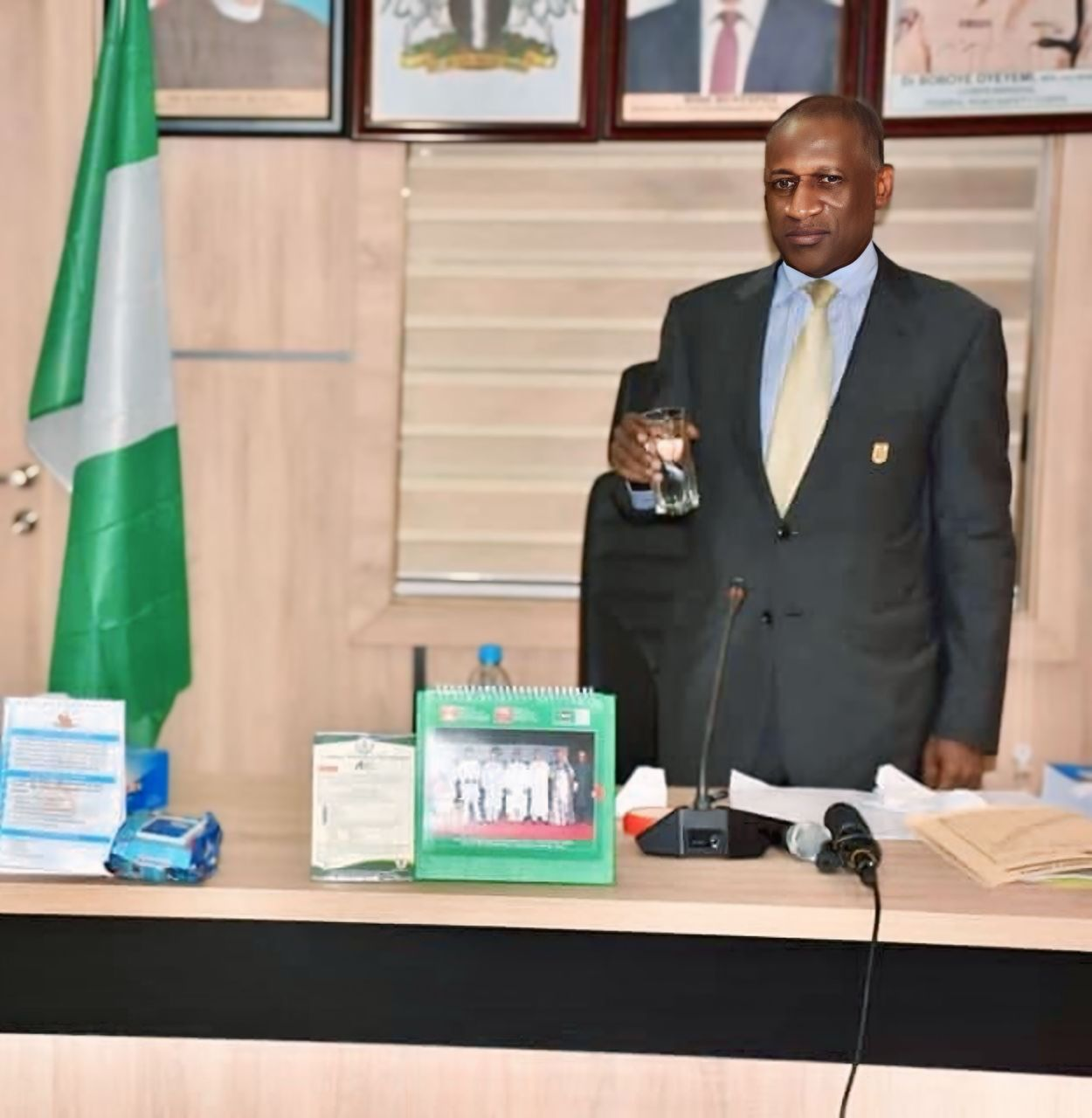
- Bukhari Bello in 2022
- Born: December 28, 1956 (age 69); Birnin Kebbi, Kebbi State, Nigeria
- Education: Ahmadu Bello University (LL.B); Nigerian Law School (B.L); National Institute for Policy and Strategic Studies (mni); Naval Postgraduate School
- Occupations: Lawyer, human rights advocate, Politician
- Years active: 1984–present
- Honours: Member of the Order of the Federal Republic (MFR)

Bukhari Bello MFR, mni, F.DRI is a Nigerian lawyer, public servant, and human rights advocate known for his work in electoral law reform, constitutional development, and international criminal justice. He served as the Executive Secretary of National Human Rights Commission (Nigeria) from 2000 to 2006, Chairman of the Federal Road Safety Corps from 2018 to 2023, and held senior legal positions in multiple federal ministries including, Justice, Defence, and Finance. Bello was involved in the legal framework of the 1993 Nigerian presidential election. and participated in the negotiations for the Rome Statute of the International Criminal Court.

== Early life and education ==
Bukhari Bello was born in Birnin Kebbi, Kebbi State, Nigeria, on 28 December 1956 to the family of Mallam Muhammadu Bello Wakilin Sha'riah, KBE. He obtained his law degree (LL.B Hons) from Ahmadu Bello University, Zaria, and was called to the Nigerian Bar in 1984. He completed the National Institute for Policy and Strategic Studies program in 2007, earning the title mni, and later attended the Senior International Defence Management Course at the Naval Postgraduate School in Monterey, California, in 2008. Bello is also a Fellow of the International Dispute Resolution Institute (F.DRI).

== Career ==
Bello began his legal career in the Sokoto State Judiciary and Ministry of Justice. He was an active member of the Nigerian Bar Association (NBA) early in his career, serving as Secretary of the NBA Sokoto Branch, which at the time covered the present-day Sokoto, Kebbi, and Zamfara States. This role earned him a seat on the NBA's National Executive Committee.

In 1988, he was elected to represent the NBA at the Constituent Assembly tasked with drafting the 1989 Constitution. During this period, he advocated for constitutional provisions to streamline judicial processes and supported the idea of a part-time legislature to reduce the cost of governance.

=== Role in the June 12, 1993, Election ===
In 1989, Bello joined the National Electoral Commission (NEC) as Assistant Chief Legal Officer and rose to become Director of Legal Services by 1993.

He was actively involved in Nigeria’s transition to civilian rule, particularly in shaping the legal framework for the June 12,1993 Nigerian presidential election. In his 2008 memoir "Laying the Foundation for Nigeria’s Democracy", then-NEC Chairman Professor Humphrey Nwosu recounted that Bello, as Director of Legal Services, presented legal arguments before the National Defence and Security Council, which influenced the military government’s decision to proceed with the election as scheduled.

Contemporary sources describe Bello as one of the few senior legal officials who openly supported Nwosu during the period of intense political pressure. After the then-Attorney General withdrew support for the election, Bello was noted for referencing previous judicial rulings in defense of NEC’s authority to proceed.

Following the annulment of the election, Bello served as Special Assistant to five successive Attorneys-General of the Federation from 1993 to 2000. During this period, he also represented Nigeria in the United Nations negotiations for the Rome Statute of the International Criminal Court, where he served as Vice-President of the 1998 Diplomatic Conference and signed the Final Act on behalf of Nigeria.

== National Human Rights Commission ==
In 2000, Bukhari Bello was appointed Executive Secretary of the National Human Rights Commission (NHRC). During his tenure, the Commission expanded its national presence and relocated its administrative headquarters to Abuja. He also supported the passage of the Child Rights Act (2003), the Freedom of Information Bill, various prison reform initiatives, and advocated for the domestication of the Convention on the Elimination of All Forms of Discrimination Against Women (CEDAW).

Under Bello's leadership, the NHRC achieved "Grade A" status from the International Coordinating Committee of National Human Rights Institutions (ICC) in Geneva, indicating compliance with the Paris Principles. The Commission also gained affiliate status with the African Commission on Human and Peoples' Rights and was represented on the ICC’s four-member Sub-Accreditation Committee responsible for reviewing other national human rights institutions worldwide.

In May 2006, Bello attended the 39th ordinary session of the African Commission on Human and Peoples' Rights (ACHPR) in Banjul, The Gambia, where he publicly condemned the harassment of journalists by Nigerian security agencies and criticized proposed constitutional amendments aimed at extending presidential term limits. According to a report by the International Federation for Human Rights (FIDH), Bello’s remarks, which included a denunciation of "African leaders who are not military men but use constitutional amendments to perpetuate themselves in power," prompted discontent from the Nigerian government, including then-President Olusegun Obasanjo. Shortly thereafter, Bello was relieved of his post as Executive Secretary of the NHRC.

His removal was widely condemned by both local and international human rights organizations, including the World Organization Against Torture, Amnesty International, and the Open Society Justice Initiative. The Special Representative of the UN Secretary-General on Human Rights Defenders and the Special Rapporteur of the African Commission on the Human and Peoples' Rights jointly condemned the removal, emphasizing that it undermined the Commission's autonomy

Following his dismissal, the NHRC was downgraded from "A" to "B" status in the global ranking of national human rights institutions. The incident prompted legislative reforms, culminating in the 2010 amendment of the NHRC Act, which enhanced the Commission's autonomy and powers.

== Later roles and legal practice ==
After leaving the NHRC, Bello returned to the Federal Ministry of Justice, then served as Director of Legal Services at the Ministries of Defence and Finance. He retired from public service in 2013 and is now Principal Partner at Bukhari Bello & Associates.

He served as Chairman of the Federal Road Safety Commission from 2018 to 2023. Bello also served as Vice President (Legal) of the Abuja Chamber of Commerce and Industry.

=== Political involvement ===
In 2014, Bello ran for governor of Kebbi State, representing the All Progressives Congress (APC) in the party's primary election ahead of the 2015 general elections. During the campaign, media reports widely positioned him as one of the front-runners for the gubernatorial ticket.

== Appointments and affiliations ==
- Member, Nigerian Body of Benchers
- Commissioner, National Electoral Commission
- Consultant, Uwais Electoral Reform Committee
- Member, Presidential Advisory Committee on National Conference
- Chairman, FRSC

== Recognition ==
- Member of the Order of the Federal Republic (MFR), Nigeria (2003)
- Kwame Nkrumah Merit Award, Ghana (2003)

== International roles ==
- Vice-President, Diplomatic Conference for the Rome Statute of the International Criminal Court
- Head of Nigeria’s Delegation to the UN Preparatory Committee on the ICC
- Member, ICC Accreditation Committee, Geneva
- Chair, Network of African National Human Rights Institutions
- Nigeria’s Representative to the UN Commission on Human Rights

== See also ==
- National Human Rights Commission (Nigeria)
- 1993 Nigerian presidential election
- Rome Statute of the International Criminal Court
