= Association of Certified Anti-Money Laundering Specialists =

American anti-money laundering organization

- Abbreviation: ACAMS
- Formation: 2001
- Headquarters: Miami, Florida, United States
- Members: 100,000 (2023)
- Official language: English
- Owner: Wendel
- CEO: Neil Sternthal
- Staff: 650+ (2025)
- Website: www.acams.org

The Association of Certified Anti-Money Laundering Specialists (ACAMS) is an organization that provides training and certification, runs conferences and disseminates information (including through the publication ACAMS Today) on detection and prevention of money laundering.

== History ==
ACAMS was founded in 2002 by Alert Global Media, owned by Charles Intriago. Intriago had previously published, since 1989, the newsletter Money Laundering Alert to provide information related to financial crimes. The formal organization was launched in February 2002. Charles and his wife, Joy, grew the organization to over 6,500 members by 2007 and established the CAMS designation for anti-money laundering (AML) professionals. ACAMS is part of the financial services segment of Adtalem Global Education (formerly DeVry Education Group), which purchased it in 2016 from Warburg Pincus for US$330 million. In August 2021, Adtalem announced it would explore strategic alternatives for this unit. Wendel acquired ACAMS in 2022.

== Locations ==
Although based in the United States, ACAMS has an international reach with 10,000 members at the end of 2009 and a strong presence in Europe, Latin America and a growing presence in Asia. In January 2009 ACAMS opened a center in Hong Kong. In June 2009 ACAMS established a Nigerian chapter in Lagos, Nigeria. The chairman of the Independent Corrupt Practices Commission (ICPC), Justice Emmanuel Ayoola, said the ICPC was looking forward to a fruitful partnership with ACAMS in the campaign against corruption and all other related crimes.

== Training ==
ACAMS provides training and assists other educational organizations in anti-money laundering courses. Its Certified Anti-Money Laundering Specialist (CAMS) program is internationally recognized. The CAMS program takes one day of education and half a day of examination, so participants must already have a strong basis in AML-related issues. The ACAMS qualifications are said to be less exacting than the graduate diplomas offered by the International Compliance Association in the United Kingdom.

In October 2004, ACAMS sent representatives to Dubai to start training Middle Eastern students to detect and prevent money laundering and terrorist financing. In July 2006, ACAMS arranged for a CAMS preparation seminar and examination on Grand Cayman. In January 2007, ACAMS gave Gregory A. Simms, former senior investigator at the Jamaican Financial Services Commission, the CAMS designation. In May 2008, ACAMS arranged CAMS testing in Beirut, attended five staff members of the Lebanese Special Investigation Commission. In July 2008, ACAMS and Case Western Reserve University School of Law offered a five-day course for compliance officers and others interested in the AML field. In May 2009, ACAMS signed an agreement with Fudan University in Shanghai to jointly provide anti-money laundering training throughout mainland China.

== Conferences ==
In December 2007, ACAMS and the Union of Arab Banks held a conference on money laundering and terrorist financing conference in Dubai. ACAMS runs annual conferences, attended mainly by bank compliance officers responsible for ensuring that their institutions follow the provisions of the Bank Secrecy Act. In September 2008, at the seventh Annual International Money Laundering Conference & Exhibition, special sessions addressed the increasing risks caused by new online banking technologies and the emerging "virtual worlds."

== Punditry ==
Executives of ACAMS are often cited in stories about money-laundering. In February 2003, Saskia Rietbroek-Garces, executive director of ACAMS, was quoted as saying "Money is like water. The money will always find the path of least resistance." In January 2005, talking of a case in which Riggs Bank failed to report suspicious transaction by General Augusto Pinochet, the former dictator of Chile, Rietbroek-Garces said it was a "textbook case study of most of the money-laundering issues that have surfaced since the Patriot Act." In another interview that month, she said that detecting terrorist financing probably is one of the most challenging tasks for both small and large banks. A Wall Street Journal article of April 2005 quoted Rietbroek-Garces as saying that the greatest problem in South America is lack of enforcement, rather than lack of an up-to-date legal system.
