= Ogidi =

Ogidi may refer to:

- Ogidi, Anambra State, a town in Nigeria
- Ogidi, Kogi State, a town in Nigeria
- Mene Ogidi, a 28-year-old Nigerian man who was extrajudicial killed on April 26, 2026.
