= Demolition of Ile-Arugbo =

Demolition of a nursing home in Kwara State, Nigeria

- Date: 2 January 2020
- Location: Ilorin, Kwara State, Nigeria
- Organised by: Committee on Review of Property of Kwara state
- Outcome: demolition of the building catapulted mixed feelings among the indigenes of the state.

The Demolition of Ile-Arugbo was ordered following a decision by the Kwara state government's Committee on Review of Property, released on 1 July 2019. The decision sought to reclaim plots of land acquired by Dr. Olusola Saraki without proper documentation. Ile-Arugbo (meaning 'old people's home) was located directly opposite the family house of Saraki's in Ilorin, Kwara state. The building was constructed on plots of land owned by Dr Saraki to provide accomodation for elderly people who visited him during his lifetime. In 1970, the state acquired the land for the construction of the phase II of its secretariat which was later abandoned.

In 1980, the project was redesigned for the construction of a civil Service Unit, State Secretariat and their parking space. In 1982, only the State Clinic was completed from the project design while the remaining pieces of land were allocated to Asa investment company. The decision of the government was informed by the Committee on Review of Sales of Property of Kwara State Government from 1999 that the said land was acquired without proof of payment. The government announced its decision to reclaim the land on 27 December 2019 before the demolition exercise took place on 2 January 2020. The demolition led to varies mixed feeling between the faction loyal to the state government, on one hand, People Democratic Party and the Saraki's dynastic in Ilorin led by Senator Bukola Saraki, Senate president of the 8th Nigeria National Assembly. on the other hand.

== Ile-Arugbo (Old peoples home) ==
Ile-Arugbo is a property owned by the late Olusola Saraki. The concept behind the structure is to serve as a platform for reaching out to aged people in Ilorin during the second republic where food, money and health care services are provided for the concerned people in the society. The said land was acquired by the state in 1970 for the construction of its Civil Service Unit, State Secretariat and parking spaces which was later abandoned. In 1980, it was redesigned but only the State Clinic was built while the rest of the land was allocated to Asa Investment Company in 1982, an entity owned by late Dr. Saraki

== Controversy and reactions ==
The controversy behind the demolition of the said property started on 27 December when an action informed by the decision of the Committee on Review of Sales of Property of Kwara state government since 1999 announced that the property opposite the family house of the late Dr Olusola Saraki was acquired without proof of payment. The committee announced its decision on 27 December 2019 and went ahead to effect its action on 2 January by 3 am ( WAT) In July 2019, the committee identified several properties of the state government that were allocated without proper documentation for reclamation. It further said the land in question was originally allocated for the construction of the state secretariat. Senator Gbemisola Saraki disagreed with the position of the state government and tagged the demolition exercise as a political vendetta against his family. According to Channels Tv, Gbemisola said "Again, as a loyal and dedicated daughter of my father, Dr Abubakar Olusola Saraki, whom I hold in very high esteem, I did not want to express my opinion on the propriety of the Governor’s recent political actions as it would be seen as biased because the late Waziri is my father. "However, given the turn of events and the violent nature of the Governor’s position, it is only right for me to speak now."

"There might have been some elements within my party, APC, who wanted to change the OTOGe narrative of the 2019 elections to be about the Sarakis and not about what it was – the removal of a failing PDP Administration."

“But clearly by some recent steps taken, especially with Thursday’s actions, Kwara State APC must be careful to not allow a few elements with their own agenda, other than governance, to turn their personal vendetta into the official position of APC in the State. They must not be allowed to hijack the narrative of what our party stands for". The People Democratic Party in the state also petitioned the National Human Rights Commission (NHRC) for the alleged use of live ammunition and tear-gas by the state government to harass the aged people who protested against the exercise.
