= Akanbi =

- Gender: Male
- Language: Yoruba

Origin
- Word/name: Nigeria
- Meaning: one who is deliberately born

Akanbi is both a surname and a given name. Notable people with the name include:

- President Bola Ahmed Akanbi Tinubu, GCFR President, Federal Republic of Nigeria
- Akanbi Oniyangi (1930–2006), Nigerian politician
- Akanbi Wright, Nigerian musician
- Mustapha Akanbi (1932–2018), Nigerian lawyer and judge
- Solomon Olusola Akanbi, Nigerian bishop
- Akanbi Omolade Oluwasegun, A Software Developer
