= Ada Jesus =

Nigerian actress and comedian (1998–2021)

- Born: Mercy Mmesoma Obi; 19 April 1998; Orlu, Imo, Nigeria
- Died: 21 April 2021 (aged 23); Zenith Medical & Kidney Centre, Abuja, Nigeria
- Education: Imo State University
- Occupations: Actress; comedian
- Spouse: Kingsley Nnadi (m. 2019)
- Children: 1

Mercy Mmesoma Obi Nnadi (née Obi; 19 April 1998 – 21 April 2021), popularly known as Ada Jesus was a Nigerian actress and comedian.

== Early life and education ==
Ada Jesus was from Orlu, Imo, Nigeria. She graduated from Imo State University.

== Career ==
Ada Jesus started modelling and attending auditions for movies and TV serials after she graduated from the university. She also worked as a housekeeper for a retired pilot, before starting her career as a stand-up comedian where she performed at events and shows. Ada Jesus became popular when she started posting comedy skits in Igbo language on Instagram and Facebook in 2018.

== Sickness and death ==
In December 2020, Ada Jesus was diagnosed with kidney disease which left her paralysed and using a wheelchair, causing her body to swell, especially her face and stomach. She was later admitted to New Hope Hospital, Onitsha, Anambra State. In April 2021, when her health deteriorated further, she went to ask for forgiveness from pastor Odumeje, the founder of Mountain of Holy Ghost Intervention and Deliverance Ministry, actress Rita Edochie and an Asaba based native doctor, Chi Marine Temple. Ada Jesus accused pastor Odumeje of conniving with Rita Edochie to stage fake miracles and deceive people in his church. She also claimed she arranged people for fake miracles in the church and helped Rita Edochie get men to sleep with her. She went further and attacked Chi Marine Temple whom she mocked and called a fake native doctor.

Chi Marine Temple forgave her when she visited him, but Odumeje and Rita Edochie refused to forgive her and instead cursed her and said her generations will suffer for the insults and lies against him. Odumeje told her to provide evidence to back her claims, adding that nobody speaks against him and goes scot-free, while Rita Edochie said she will not recover from the ailment. On 11 April 2021, Rita Edochie forgave her. On 14 April 2021, aided by human rights activist Harrison Gwamnishu, she was moved from New Hope Hospital, Onitsha, Anambra State to Zenith Medical & Kidney Centre, Abuja, Nigeria where her health improved and she was able to do certain things she couldn't do before. On 17 April 2021, Odumeje forgave her and donated ₦1 million for her treatment which Ada Jesus's mother openly rejected.

On 20 April 2021, she suffered a cardiac arrest in the night and was rushed to the intensive care unit of Zenith Medical & Kidney Centre where the doctors monitored her; she died the following morning at approximately 7:15 am.

== Personal life ==
Ada Jesus was the third child in her family. She married Kingsley Nnadi on 5 April 2019 and gave birth to a daughter on 6 December 2019.
