= Flaxman Qoopane =

South African literary figure

- Born: Moalosi Jacob Qoopane; 1955; Mangaung, Union of South Africa
- Died: 22 November 2017 (aged 61–62); Mangaung, South Africa
- Occupations: Novelist, poet and journalist
- Writing career
- Notable work: Reneiloe-Mpho's story, Letters to a Poet

Moalosi Jacob Qoopane (1955–2017), also known as "Flaxman", was known as "the father of literature and arts" in Bloemfontein. Qoopane was a South African literary activist and internationally recognised author, poet, journalist and biographer.

== Early life ==
Qoopane was born in 1955 in Mangaung in the Free State. He spent most of his childhood as well as his career in the Free State. His interest for writing began at an early age.

== Career ==
Qoopane left for Tanzania and lived in exile from 1977 to 1992. Upon his return, he continued to write articles, essays, fictional stories and poetry. Flaxman Qoopane and Omoseye Bolaji soon became household names in Mangaung. Their popularity grew because their articles were frequently published in the Next magazine. Qoopane also contributed to a popular national daily newspaper, the Daily Sun and also Realtime magazine. Qoopane's work also appeared in publications such as Hola, Sowetan, Bona, Drum, A and E, Kopanaang and Free State News. Qoopane established and curated the Qoopane Literary Gallery where profiles of local writers and journalists are displayed sourced from an extensive range of newspaper and magazine clippings. He also developed the children's library in Hillside View in Rocklands. The library is close to the University of the Free State satellite campus in Mangaung and caters for approximately 100 children. Qoopane also published in the Bloemfontein Courant. Qoopane dedicated his time and effort into creating opportunities and resources to writers in Bloemfontein. He was one of the most well-known writers whose career spanned the period of unbanning Black people from publishing their work in South Africa.

== Travels ==
Qoopane has showcased his writing and poetry work in countries such as the Netherlands, Italy, the United Kingdom, Mozambique and Lesotho. His journalism continued to develop during his time in exile and Qoopane was particularly successful in East Africa.

== Bibliography ==
Works written by Qoopane include:

- The Crest: Omoseye Bolaji honoured in Nigeria (2008)
- Macufe 2001 (2002)
- City of Roses and Literary Icons (2007)
- Reneiloe-Mpho's story (2002)
- A Poet Abroad (2000)
- Memoirs of a Cultural Activist (2000)
- Adventures in Journalism (2001)

The book Reneiloe-Mpho's story is believed to have been dedicated to his daughter Reneiloe-Mpho when she was 2 years old. Qoopane also had many unpublished and minor writings including, Women of Talent. The book Letters to a Poet was edited by Alitta M Mokhuoa. It focused on Qoopane's early correspondence as a journalist and inspired many writers such as Zakes Mda, Njabulo Ndebele and Vonani Bila.

== Death ==
Qoopane died on 22 November in 2017 at the age of 62. He was reportedly ill prior to his death. Qoopane was working as a communications officer at the metro's officer at the time of his death. Various members of the Bloemfontein community also took various social media sites to express their sadness over Qoopane's death.

== See also ==
- Daily Sun
- Drum (South African magazine)
- Omoseye Bolaji
