= Emmanuel Ayoola =

Nigerian lawyer and judge (1933–2024)

Emmanuel Olayinka Ayoola (27 October 1933 – 20 August 2024) was a Nigerian lawyer and judge who became Chairman of the Independent Corrupt Practices Commission in 2005. He was also a judge of the Appeals Chamber of the Special Court for Sierra Leone.

== Early life ==
Emmanuel Ayoola was born on 27 October 1933. He obtained a Bachelor of Laws degree from the University of London, and a BA in Jurisprudence from Oxford University. He was called to the English Bar at Lincoln's Inn in 1957. In 1959 he was admitted as a barrister and solicitor of the Supreme Court of Nigeria. For seventeen years he had a private legal practice in Ibadan, Oyo State.

== Judicial career ==
In 1976 he was appointed a Judge of the High Court of Western Nigeria, and soon after a judge of the High Court of Oyo State. He served as a Justice of the Court of Appeal of the Gambia (1980–1983) and was Chief Justice of the Gambia (1983–1992). He was Vice President of the World Judges Association in 1991. He was President of the Court of Appeals of Seychelles, and Justice of the Court of Appeal of Nigeria (1992–1998), Justice of the Supreme Court of Nigeria (1998–2003), retiring in October 2003 at the mandatory age of 70.

He then became the Chairman of the National Human Rights Commission of Nigeria (2003–2005) and Chairman of the Working Committee on Law Revision of the Laws of the Federation of Nigeria, 2000.

The Secretary-General of the United Nations appointed Ayoola as President of Appeals Chamber of the Special Court for Sierra Leone (2004–2005), set up to try those responsible for the Sierra Leone Civil War. He has edited the Seychelles Law Digest, the Law Reports of the Gambia, and the Nigerian Monthly Law Reports.

== Independent Corrupt Practices Commission ==
In 2005 Ayoola was appointed Chairman of the Independent Corrupt Practices Commission, replacing Mustapha Akanbi on his retirement. In August 2008, Ayoola said that all acts of corruption that hamper government efforts in the fight against corruption should attract a mandatory sentence to life imprisonment without remission.

== Death ==
Ayoola died on 20 August 2024, at the age of 90.
