= Killing of Mene Ogidi =

2026 death in Delta state, Nigeria

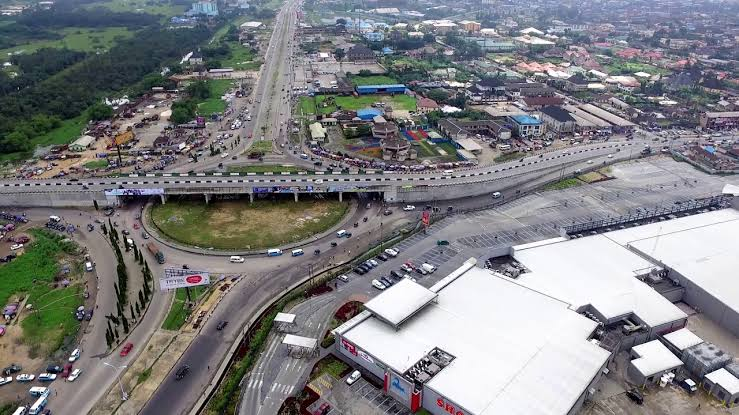
- A picture of Effurun
- Date: April 26, 2026
- Time: Daytime (GMT)
- Location: Effurun, Delta State, Nigeria
- Type: Extrajudicial killing
- Deaths: Mene Ogidi
- Accused: Nuhu Usman

On 26 April 2026, in Effurun, Mene Ogidi, a 28-year-old man, was extrajudically killed after being restrained to the ground and shot close-range by Nuhu Usman, Assistant Superintendent of Police (ASP), a senior commissioned officer rank in the Nigeria Police Force (NPF). Mene was delivering a waybill package for a customer, which allegedly contained a Beretta pistol and four rounds of ammunition, when he was stopped and searched by Nuhu. After Nuhu seized the package, Mene was accused of possession of a weapon whereas he was then restrained and tied to the ground. Disregarding Nigerian law, Nuhu proceeded to load a shotgun while a restrained Mene pleaded for his life and offered to take the police to where he picked up the package. Nuhu then shot and killed Mene at point-blank range.

Two days later, a video of the incident aired on social media where bystanders recorded the encounter, sparking controversy towards the Delta State Police Command in Nigeria. On 28 April 2026, Nuhu was arrested and transferred to Force Headquarters in Abuja for a disciplinary action.

== Incident ==
The incident took place along the Warri-Sapele Expressway in Effurun. On the morning of 26 April 2026, Mene Ogidi went to Sapele to collect a waybill for a friend. Officers of Delta State Police Command later responded to an anonymous source from Benin Motor Park. Mene Ogidi was attempting to waybill a package which unbeknownst to him allegedly held Beretta pistol and four rounds of ammunition. The police force, led by ASP Nuhu Usman, detained and handcuffed Mene Ogidi to ground where he sat. Nuhu questioned Oghenemine on the contents of the package before opening it to discover the pistol. A confused Mene insisted that he was only delivering a waybill, had no knowledge of the pistol, and would lead the police to the sender of the package. During this time, a crowd of nearby people began to gather closer and view the incident. Some onlookers began recording the incident with their cellphones.

Nuhu ignored Mene's explanation and prepared to load a shotgun, assisted by his fellow officers. Seeing Nuhu loading his shotgun, Mene began to cry and further exclaim that he knew nothing about the contents of the package. At point-blank range, he aimed and fired the shotgun at Mene, killing him instantly. On 28 April 2026, a cell phone-recorded video from a bystander was given to Nigerian human rights activist Harrison Gwamnishu who shared the video to his social media, prompting viewers to become outraged at the Delta State Police Command.

== Legal proceedings ==
=== Investigation and indictment ===
Following the incident, Mene's body was taken to a mortuary for a mandatory autopsy. Delta State Commissioner of Police Yemi Oyeniyi ordered the immediate arrest of Nuhu Usman and transfer to the State Headquarters in Asaba for preliminary investigation. Nuhu was later transferred to Police Force Headquarters in Abuja for violating Force Order 237 and the Police Force Standard Operating Procedure. Nuhu is expected to appear before Force Disciplinary Committee for a disciplinary sanction and prosecution. The Force Disciplinary Committee (FDC), in collaboration with the Orderly Room Tribunal, investigated the incident and confirmed violations of operational procedures and unlawful conduct. Inspector-General of Police (IGP) Olatunji Disu also ordered all officers involved to be immediately transferred from the Delta State Command to Force Headquarters in Abuja, for internal disciplinary processes without delay.

Nuhu Usman has been reportedly dismissed from the police and will be charged with extrajudicial killing and violation of rules of engagement.

== People involved ==
=== Mene Ogidi ===
Picture of Mene Ogidi

Mene Ogidi (born Oghenemine Ogidi) was a 28-year-old Nigerian born and raised in Delta State, Nigeria. He had three siblings, including an older brother, an older sister, and a late brother, Oghenerume Ogidi. He was the second son of Stella Ogidi. His father died in 2022, approximately one month after the death of his eldest brother.

Ogidi attended Dore Numa College in Warri for his secondary education. Prior to that, he attended Wisdom Academy for his primary schooling. At the time of his death, While at Dore, he was reported to have worked as a plumber. And also was worked as a package delivery driver. In addition to his employment, he performed as a rapper using the stage name OG Million. In October 2019, he released two songs, "Complicated" and "Chains" on Audiomack.

=== Nuhu Usman ===
Nuhu Usman was an Assistant Superintendent of Police (ASP), which is a senior commissioned officer rank in the Nigeria Police Force (NPF).

== Reactions and protests ==
=== Oghenemine's family ===
Mene Ogidi's mother spoke with News Central on 30 April 2026, stating, "I am not fine. My child, who made many promises, is no more. When he was alive, he would say, 'My father is dead. Look at me. You will see my father in me. Don't worry, when my music is released, I will take you all over the world. You are my senior wife." She also disclosed that in 2022, one of her sons who was younger than Oghenemine, was arrested in his home and taken into police custody where was also killed.

=== Public officials and community ===
After a video recording of the incident aired on social media websites on Tuesday 28 April 2026, the Delta State Police Command came under fire and protests were formed, calling for the prosecution of Nuhu Usman.

Delta State Commissioner of Police Yemi Oyeniyi described the killing as a clear violation of established rules and procedures guiding police operations. He extended his condolences to Mene's family and promised that justice would be served. Inspector-General of Police (IGP) Olatunji Disu stated "Let me be clear: this action was criminal, it was unprofessional, and it has no place in the Nigeria Police Force. The NPF is an institution built on the rule of law, and we have zero tolerance for lawlessness within our ranks. No uniform is a license to kill." Bright Edafe, the spokesperson for the police in Delta, later said in an Channels TV interview "There is no explanation for this. Police cannot attribute problems to spirituality, but that may not be far from it. Because that’s the only explanation one can give to what he did."

Torty Njoku Kalu, Head of Protocol and Public Affairs for the Chairman, Police Service Commission, affirmed that the act violated Nigerian laws and international humanitarian standards; including the International Humanitarian Law, the Constitution of the Federal Republic of Nigeria (1999 as amended), the Anti-Torture Act 2017, the Administration of Criminal Justice Act 2015, the Nigeria Police Act 2020, and the Nigeria Police Force Regulations 2025.

Nigeria politician Peter Obi labeled Mene's death "barbaric", calling it "a grave violation of the rule of law". Obi further stated "Such acts inflict unimaginable trauma on the bereaved family and deepen public anxiety in an already distressed society. Nigerians are already traumatised by recurring reports of brutal killings by terror organisations across the country, and incidents of this nature - especially when involving state actors - only worsen that psychological burden and erode public confidence in safety and security." The Delta State Chapter of De Norsemen Kclub International (DNKI) describing the killing as unacceptable and a gross violation of human rights. Human rights lawyer Inihebe Effiong, stated that aside from the arrest and dismissal of the officer Nuhu Usman, Inspector-General of Police (IGP) Olatunji Disu should remove Delta State police commissioner Yemi Oyeniyi and sanction the police personnel related to the murder.

=== Further allegations ===
Shortly after the incident was made public, a woman named Ozima Paris Ekeh also identified Nuhu Usman as the police officer that threatened and sexually assaulted her in 2023. Ekeh posted an elaborate story on her social media, where she alleges that in addition to being sexually assaulted and threatened at gunpoint by Nuhu, Nuhu demanded that she pay a total of ₦50,000 or be taken to the local police station. Ekeh paid ₦50,000 out of fear for her life.

== See also ==
- Extrajudicial killings in Nigeria
