= Youths For Human Rights Protection And Transparency Initiative =

Youths for Human Rights Protection and Transparency Initiative
- Founded: April 2, 2015 by Kenneth Uwadi in Nigeria
- Type: Non-profit; NGO
- Headquarters: Owerri, Nigeria
- Location: Nigeria
- Fields: Protecting human rights, Legal advocacy, Media attention, Direct-appeal Campaigns Compassionate Presence, Advocacy, Empowerment, Education
- President: Kenneth Uwadi
- Website: www.yarpti.org

Youths for Human Rights Protection and Transparency Initiative (YARPTI) is a non governmental organization in Nigeria dedicated to promoting the well-being and protection of children and young people. YARPTI also exposes human rights abuses, it was founded on the 2nd of April, 2015. The organization opposes violations of what it considers basic human rights.

== Vision and Mission ==
Yarpti's mission is to promote and protect the rights of children and young people and to also expose human rights abuses. The organization also offer support to young people to help them mature into adults who contribute to society. YARPTI is also geared towards providing hope for the hopeless.

== Leadership ==
The president and founder of the organization is Kenneth Uwadi. Uwadi is a popular socio political crusader from Imo state of Nigeria

== Programs ==
Yarpti speak out against corruption in Nigeria and promote transparency, accountability and integrity at all levels and across all sectors of the Nigerian society as well as seeking the empowerment of the Nigerian youth, disabled children, women, vulnerable individuals and the disadvantaged and poorest communities in rural and urban areas to enable them to participate actively in social and economic decision-making processes.

== See also ==
- Human rights in Nigeria
