= Human rights in Nigeria =

Human rights in Nigeria are protected under the current constitution of 1999. While Nigeria has made major improvements in human rights under this constitution, the American Human Rights Report of 2012 notes several areas in need of improvement, including: abuses by Boko Haram, killings by government forces, lack of social equality and issues with freedom of speech. The Human Rights Watch's 2015 World Report states that intensified violence by Boko Haram, restrictions of LGBT rights and government corruption continue to undermine the status of human rights in Nigeria.

== Fundamental Human Right of a Nigerian Constitution ==
The constitution's chapter 4 of the Nigerian Human Rights guarantees the:

- Right of life
- Right of dignity of human persons
- Right to personal liberty.
- Right to fair hearing
- Right to private and family life
- Right of freedom of thought conscience and religion
- Right to freedom of expression and the press
- Right of peaceful assembly and association
- Right of freedom of movement
- Right to freedom from discrimination
- Right to acquire and own immovable property
- Compulsory acquisition of property
- Restriction on and derogation from fundamental human rights
- Special jurisdiction of high court and legal aid.

== History since independence ==
In the period between Nigeria's independence in 1960 and return to democracy in 1999, the country had two Heads of State, one appointed, one military successor and 7 coups d'état; i.e. government takeovers by military leaders. Architects of most of the coups sought to justify usurpation of power by alleging corruption or incapacity of the incumbent leader. In 1979, Nigeria adopted a presidential system to institute a legal process of choosing a leader by enacting a new constitution. This constitution was also intended to guarantee fundamental human rights, but has largely been ineffective.

The regime of General Ibrahim Babangida, among others, was noted for egregious human rights abuses.

Although Nigeria has been active in signing and ratifying international human rights treaties over the years, it has seen challenges when trying to implement these treaties domestically. Nigeria operates under a dualist system and cannot apply international treaties unless they are ratified by the legislative houses in Nigeria. Furthermore, although the Nigerian constitution protects civil and political rights, international treaties like the African Charter are intended to expand protection to cultural, socio-economic, and group rights. However, because the Nigerian constitution is the supreme law, the Supreme Court of Nigeria often resolves conflicts in favour of the constitution, thereby restricting the potential expansion of human rights.

== Freedom of expression and the press ==
In 1985, after General Ibrahim Babangida took over the government, he repealed Decree No. 4 of 1984, a law that made it criminal behaviour to publish any material that was considered embarrassing or against the interests of the government. This led to renewed hope for freedom of expression both by the people and the media. Within the Babangida regime, political tolerance occurred for some time. However, this brief foray into expanding human rights broke down when the regime began jailing its critics and firing employees who did not promote the regime's views and ideas. The Babangida regime ended up closing down more newspapers and banning more popular organizations than any other in Nigeria's post-colonial history.

The paparazzi in Nigeria was often subject to scare tactics and intimidation. Journalists were subjected to "chats" with the State Security Service that involved threats and possible imprisonment. There were continually newspaper shutdowns. In 1990, The Republic, Newbreed, Lagos Daily News, The Punch, and various other newspapers were shut down at different points by the federal government.

In 1999, freedom of expression became protected by the new Nigerian Constitution. However, defamation laws were also passed, and some have speculated that the defamation laws can be abused to limit freedom of speech.

Critics maintain that though measures of freedom of the press have improved, there is still room for improvement. Nigeria was described as "partly free" in the Freedom of the Press 2011 report published by the Freedom House (see yearly rankings in Freedom House ratings in Nigeria section).

On 26 April 2020, the Reporter without Borders World Press Freedom Index ranked Nigeria 115 out of 180 countries surveyed. Reporters without Borders cited killing, detention and brutalisation of journalists alongside targeted attempts to shrink the civic space by the Nigerian Government as a reason for the ranking. However, this rank is higher than the 146 ranks which Transparency International gave Nigeria earlier in the year in regards to corruption. The Reporters without Borders report further stated "With more than 100 independent newspapers, Africa's most populous nation enjoys real media pluralism but covering stories involving politics, terrorism or financial embezzlement by the powerful is very problematic." In 2025 the Reporters without Borders ranking has fallen to 122 out of 180 ranked countries.

On 24 July 2020, the United Nations official urged the Nigerian authorities to immediately release a prominent human rights defender Mubarak Bala, who has been detained for more than two months without charges, on accusations of blasphemy.

In late September 2020, the United Nations human rights experts urged Nigerian authorities to release singer Yahaya Sharif-Aminu, who was convicted and sentenced to death over an allegedly blasphemous song. U.N. Human Rights Special Procedures group claimed that a group of people burned down the singer's home on 4 March.

On 4 June 2021, the Federal Government of Nigeria announced a ban on Twitter after President Muhammadu Buhari's tweet was removed by Twitter for being abusive against a specific tribe of the country and capable of inciting violence, a violation of the rules of the platform. This move is a further concern in regards to the expression of free speech and communication in the country. In January 2022, Nigeria lifted its blocking of Twitter. Twitter (now X) agreed to establish a legal entity within the country sometime in the first quarter of 2022.

== Government violations ==
Nigerian security forces are frequently alleged to carry out arbitrary arrests, torture, forced disappearances, assassinations and extrajudicial summary executions. These abuses typically occur within the context of the Nigerian government's security operations or are directed against political and religious organizations and individuals. Several instances of mass killings of political opponents and agitators by security forces have been reported.

=== Army ===
On 12–14 December 2015, the Nigerian Army carried out a massacre of 347 members of the Islamic Movement of Nigeria (IMN) in Zaria, Kaduna State and buried the bodies in mass graves. In March 2020, it was revealed that some Nigeria army soldiers took advantage of food shortages at refugee camps in Borno state and raped women at female-designated "satellite camps" in exchange for granting them food. These refugee camp food shortages have also been reported to result in the death of thousands of people since 2015. On 4 April 2020, three Army soldiers were arrested in Lagos state for issuing threats to rape women. On 21 May 2020, two Lagos state Army deserters, Kehinde Elijah and Ezeh Joseph, were arrested for their involvement in the murder of a police sergeant on 10 May 2020. The shooters, who were afterwards taken into military custody, were also assisted by a Nigerian police officer and were wanted for "violent crimes."

=== Police force ===
In Nigeria, the Nigeria Police Force has been commonly viewed as inefficient and corrupt. The Nigerian Joint Task Force (JTF) has been accused of providing an inadequate and violent response to the Boko Haram attacks. The JTF has been involved in killing suspects without fair trial as well as killing multiple members of different communities suspected of supporting the Boko Haram. Human Rights Watch has stated that these actions violate human rights with the lack of access to a fair trial and use of discriminatory techniques to determine perpetrators of violence.

Within the regular Nigerian Police Force, there are high amounts of corruption and violations that include extortion and embezzlement. A common extortion tactic of the police force involves putting up unnecessary roadblocks that require a fee to pass. Within the police force, there is no equal protection under the law. The wealthy are able to pay off the police to act as their security, as well as expect the police to turn a blind eye to any illegal activities they may participate in.

On 2 August 2019, two officers of the Nigerian Police Force's Anti-Cultism Squad, Insp. Ogunyemi Olalekan and Sgt. Godwin Orji, were arrested and charged with murdering a man during a raid in Lagos. On 21 August 2019, four SARS operatives were arrested and charged with murder after being caught on film manhandling and then shooting to death two suspected phone thieves in broad daylight. The shooting occurred after the suspected thieves had already been arrested.

On 5 January 2020, three Nigerian Police Force officers were arrested for beating bus passenger Justice Obasi, after he refused to unlock his mobile phone. On 3 April 2020, a Nigerian police officer was arrested for assaulting a port worker. On 18 April 2020, the Nigerian Police Force stated that two of its officers were arrested after being caught on film beating a woman at the Odo Ori Market in Iwo, Osun.

On 28 April 2020, Nigerian Police Force's Rivers State Police Command arraigned former Sgt. Bitrus Osaiah in court for shooting to death his female colleague, Lavender Elekwachi, during a raid on street trading and illegal motor parks the previous week. Osaiah was dismissed as a police officer the previous day for killing Elekwachi, who also held the rank of a Sergeant. It was reported that Osaiah was in fact arrested for the killing. On 21 May 2020, Yahaha Adeshina, the Divisional Police Officer of Ilemba Hausa Division, was arresting for assisting Kehinde Elijah and Ezeh Joseph in the 10 May 2020 murder of sergeant Onalaja Onajide. All three shooters were nervously wanted for violent crimes. On 30 May 2020, two Lagos police officers were arrested for shooting to death a 16-year old girl.

In February 2019, it was reported that Nigerian police officers commonly gained extra money by extorting local residents. On 30 July 2019, three Nigeria Police Force Officers from Anambra State were arrested on charges of extorting three residents. On 10 November 2019, the Nigerian Police Force issued a statement revealing that Safer Highways Patrol officer Onuh Makedomu was arrested after being filmed accepting a bribe from a motorist in Lagos. On 9 March 2020, two Nigeria Police Force officers from Lagos, Assistant Superintendent of Police (ASP) Adebayo Ojo and Sergeant Adeleke Mojisola were both arrested on charges of extorting a woman. On 11 April 2020 another Nigeria Police Force officer from Lagos, Inspector Taloju Martins, was arrested after being caught on camera exhorting a motorist. On 3 June 2020, the Adamawa State police command announced that one of its officers was arrested for murdering a motorcyclist who refused to pay him a bribe.

On 31 July 2020, Peter Ebah, an inspector officer for the Nigeria Police Forces's Rivers Command, was arrested for raping a woman at a checkpoint in the Tai area of Rivers State for not wearing a face mask. As of 9 September 2020, he was still in custody for the rape. A case involving accusations that Nigeria Police Force officers in Abuja raped some of the 65 women who were arrested for illicit nightclub activity in April 2019 after they refused to pay the officers bribes for their release was still ongoing as well.

On 21 October 2020, UN Secretary General António Guterres issued a statement criticizing Nigerian authorities, as many protesters were shot dead and wounded during a violent escalation in Lagos. Amnesty International reported that at least 12 people were shot dead but, the government confirmed only two deaths in October. In November, the government admitted that there were live rounds shot in Lekki by the police. In December 2020, the government confirmed that 51 civilians, 11 police officers, and seven soldiers lost their lives in the ongoing conflict between protesters and police. Protesters are demanding police reforms, and Lekki Toll Gate has become a rallying cry for Nigerians.

On 26 April 2026, Delta State police ASP Nuhu Usman was dismissed from the police force after the extrajudicial killing of Mene Ogidi. Nuhu shot and killed a restrained Mene Ogidi at point-blank range, violating Force Order 237 and the Police Force Standard Operating Procedure.

=== SARS controversies and dismantlement ===
On 22 October 2020, Nigerian President Muhammadu Buhari confirmed in a publicly-aired address that Nigeria's controversial Special Anti-Robbery Squad (SARS) had been dismantled, as a response to the demands of the widespread End SARS protests. He also accused some members of SARS of committing "acts of excessive force" when the unit was operational. Plans were then put in place to also prosecute some former SARS members for extortion, rape, and murder. Numerous Nigerians had long accused the controversial police unit of committing acts of extortion, rape, torture and murder.

=== Corruption ===
Nigeria has the label of having one of the world's highest levels of corruption. This is especially seen within the public sector including stealing public funds and accepting bribes. It is estimated that between 1999 and 2007, the country lost around $4–8 billion yearly due to corruption.

Politicians often siphon public funds to further their political careers, in addition to paying off gangs to aid them in rigging their elections. The elections since the end of military rule occurring in 1999, 2003, and 2007 were bloody affairs and were openly rigged. In 2007, ballot boxes were visibly stuffed by paid hoodlums and in some cases, electoral results were simply made up. Human Rights Watch estimates that at least 300 were killed due to the 2007 elections, and that is considered to be a conservative estimate, as cited from a Human Rights Watch telephone interview with Derrick Marco, Nigeria country director in March 2007. These measures of violence and intimidation discouraged the general public from voting. Those who did come out were subject to attacks by hired gangs.

The current Fourth Republic of Nigeria has strengthened its laws against corruption. As part of its efforts, the government established the Independent Corrupt Practices Commission (ICPC) and Economic and Financial Crimes Commission (EFCC) in the early 2000s. However, due to the previous institutionalization of corruption, the battle against corruption is ongoing. These anti-corruption commissions have made attempts to combat the issue, but have been lenient in terms of punishment of convicted offenders. As an example, former Edo State governor Lucky Igbinedion pleaded guilty to embezzling 2.9 billion Naira (approx. $24.2 million). However, he had a plea bargain with the EFCC and was fined 3.5 million Naira ($29,167) and did not serve any jail time. As of January 2015, many high-level politicians remain un-investigated and only lower-level officials with less influence are arrested.

In 2015, newly elected Nigerian President Muhammadu Buhari began a major crackdown on corruption in Nigeria. Despite criticism, the Nigerian Economic and Financial Crimes Commission (EFCC) announced in May 2018 that 603 Nigerian figures had been convicted on corruption charges since Buhari took office in 2015. The EFCC also announced that for the first time in Nigeria's history, judges and top military officers including retired service chiefs are being prosecuted for corruption. In January 2020, however, Transparency International's Corruption Perception Index (CPI) still gave Nigeria a low ranking spot of 146 out of 180 countries surveyed. By October 2020, however, even End SARS protestors alleged that Nigerian police officers, despite being known for having a long history of corruption, were now not being adequately paid, and despite protesting police brutality, called for an increase in police salaries so they could be "adequately compensated for protecting lives and property of citizens" as one of their five demands.

=== Forced evictions ===
Forced evictions are an integral aspect of human rights violation. They comprise the forceful removal of persons without their assent and against their will on a temporary or permanent basis from their homeland, normal place of abode without clear preparations for adequate compensation and relocation. This increases the problems of displacement of individuals and homelessness in countries. Governments at different levels continue to forcefully evict people without adequate compensation in some African countries including Nigeria which is estimated to have the largest urban slum population in sub Saharan Africa in terms of size and percentage of the total population. Centre on Housing Rights and Evictions (COHRE) has labelled Nigeria as a consistent violator of housing rights.

The Nigerian government forcefully evicted over 2 million people between 2000 and 2009. In Lagos State alone, between 2003 and 2015, communities in Makoko Yaba, Ijora East, Ijora Badiya, PURA-NPA Bar Beach, Ikota Housing Estate, Ogudu Ori-Oke, Mosafejo in Oshodi, Agric-Owutu, Ageologo-Mile 12, and Mile 2 Okokomaiko have been forcefully evicted under the guise of development. Between July and September 2000, at least 50,000 people in Abuja were evicted without prior notices or adequate alternative accommodation. The evictions were done to move communities/settlements who government claimed had distorted the Abuja Development Master Plan.

In Lagos State, Nigeria, the forced evictions are done with the major purpose of reclaiming the land and building luxury apartments as the population of the country continue to soar creating housing deficits. However, this breeds discrimination and inequality as the new buildings do not fulfill any housing need for the general populace. In July 2016, the Lagos State Ministry of Waterfront Infrastructure Development after a notice of 72hrs forcefully evicted residents of Makoko, a waterfront community made up of six villages - Oko Agbon, Adogbo, Migbewhe, Yanshiwhe, Sogunro and Apollo without a court order. This rendered an estimated 30,000 people homeless. Makoko is one of the nine communities targeted in the $200 Million World Bank-funded Lagos Metropolitan Development and Governance Project (LMDGP) of the Lagos State government for urbanization, waste management, drainage and water supply. The community which has been in existent for more than 100yrs is said to have started as a settlement of fishermen from Togo and the Republic of Benin.

At least 266 structures in Badia East community, Lagos State which were being used as homes and businesses were pulled down in February 2013, by the State government. The Resettlement Action Plan which was agreed to in April 2013 did not have clear-cut remedies for adequate resettlement of the displaced persons. Badia is one of the communities slated for urbanization through upgrading from being a slum in the $200 million World Bank-funded Lagos Metropolitan Development and Governance Project (LMDGP). The project specifies minimal involuntary resettlement and where absolutely necessary such must have been discussed and agreed on with the residents including adequate notice, compensation and well spelt-out resettlement plans.

Between 2016 and 2017, Otodo-Gbame an ancestral fishing community and Ilubrin community were forcefully sacked from their homes with fatalities after 12 days of written eviction notice. On 17 March 2017, despite a January 2017 court injunction, Itedo, a waterfront community of more than 35,000 persons was forcefully evicted early in the morning while some were still asleep. In 2019, a UN Special Rapporteur on right to adequate housing asked that Nigerian government declares a nationwide moratorium on forced evictions.

On 20 January 2020 residents of Tarkwa Bay, a waterfront community, was forcefully evicted by security personnel in what has been termed a gross violation of human rights. Oil theft through the pipelines along the beach is the reason given by government authorities for the forced evictions.

== Boko Haram ==
Boko Haram is an Islamist terrorist group that focuses its attacks on government officials, Christians, and fellow Muslims who speak out against their actions or are thought to aid the government, known as "traitor Muslims". Attacks are primarily focused in northeast Nigeria. They cite corruption committed by the national government as well as increased Western influence as the primary reason for their often violent actions. This group engaging in jihad was banded in 2000 by the spiritual leader Mohammed Yusuf.

In July 2009, there were five days of extreme violence from Boko Haram as well as with the governmental response. From 26 to 31 July, the group killed 37 Christian men and burned 29 churches. After a brief hiatus in claimed incidents, the group resurfaced in the summer of 2011 with church attacks.

In October 2013, Amnesty International recommended that the Nigerian government investigate the deaths of more than 950 suspected Boko Haram members that died under military custody in the first six months of the year.

In 2014, Boko Haram drew international attention from its 14 April kidnapping of approximately 230 female students from a secondary school in the northern town of Chibok, Nigeria. Boko Haram leader Abubakar Shekau claims the girls have converted to Islam and has threatened to sell them as wives or slaves to Boko Haram members at a price of $12.50 each. Boko Haram has also attacked schools in Yobe State and forced hundreds of young men to join their forces, killing those who refused. Persistent violence in northeast Nigeria in 2014 has caused the deaths of over 2,500 civilians and the displacement of more than 700,000.

From 3 to 7 January 2015, Boko Haram militants seized and razed the towns of Baga and Doron-Baga and reportedly killed at least 150 people in the Baga Massacre.

Boko Haram kills civilians, abducts women and girls, forcefully conscripts boys and men, and even destroys homes and schools.

According to a UNICEF report, Boko Haram abducted more than 1,000 children between 2013 and 2018, including the 276 Chibok schoolgirls. More than 100 Chibok girls are yet to return home even after five years of the incidence.

On 2 December 2020, Boko Haram jihadists admitted that they were behind the brutal massacre in northeast Nigeria. They slaughtered 76 farmers in Borno State. Attacks were carried out in revenge as the farmers were helping the Nigerian Army. They supported the army in the arrest of one of its brothers, Abubakar Shekau, said in a video.

In a shocking development, it was reported in May, 2021 that the Boko Haram leader Abubakar Shekau has been killed by rival Islamic State-allied fighters in the northern part of Nigeria. These claims by different reporters are yet to be confirmed by the Nigerian army which released a statement saying that it is still investigating report about Shekau's death.

== Social rights and equality ==
=== LGBT rights ===
In May 2013, Nigeria's House of Representatives voted to pass the Same-Sex Marriage Bill, which prohibits gay marriage and public displays of affection between same-sex couples and allots fourteen years in prison to those engaged in same-sex relationships. This bill also allows punishment for those knowingly associating with those identifying as members of the LGBT community or aiding these individuals in becoming married or pursuing that 'lifestyle'. The punishment for abetting gay marriage is 5 years imprisonment. Furthermore, the bill criminalizes any association with gay identity and the promotion of lesbian and gay rights, such as gathering privately with gay people. The Same-Sex Marriage Bill was ratified by President Goodluck Jonathan in January 2014 and has received much condemnation from the West for its restriction of the freedoms of expression and assembly for the LGBT community in Nigeria. In July 2015, President Muhammadu Buhari in one of his visits to the United States of America told American President Barack Obama that he will not support same sex marriage in Nigeria and that sodomy is against the law of the country and abhorent against the Nigerian culture and way of life.

Peter Tatchell has stated that the Same-Sex Marriage Bill is "the most comprehensively homophobic legislation ever proposed in any country in the world." Shawn Gaylord, Advocacy Counsel of Human Rights First, has said that the Same-Sex Marriage Bill "sets a dangerous precedence for persecution and violence against minorities" not only in Nigeria, but throughout Africa as a whole. Numerous cases against LGBT individuals in Nigeria highlight the ongoing violation of LGBT rights, and suggest a lack of governmental support for their protection.

=== Women ===
Women in Nigeria face various versions of human rights violations despite the provisions granted unto them in the 1999 Constitution. Although women in Nigeria have the opportunity to challenge unconstitutional practices in higher courts, this option is rarely exercised, resulting in the continued occurrence of rights violations.

Women participating in Nigeria’s informal economy often experience a degree of autonomy; however, societal norms typically place men in control of key resources such as land and credit. Educated women may attain higher social status, largely depending on their connections to influential men. While education has opened doors to wage labor—which gives women more control —they continue to face limitations imposed by social expectations and cultural boundaries. Even when employment opportunities exist, traditional norms in Nigerian society tend to prioritize a woman's role within the family, viewing careers as secondary to her responsibilities as a mother or housewife.

Nigerian women face particular problems and injustices once they become widows. The women are subject to cultural pressures that are inconsistent with human rights. In the widowhood practice, culture demands that when a man of significance within the community dies, his widow must act in a certain way as documented by Akpo Offiong Bassey in her studies of the Cross River State. In some Nigerian tribal cultures, the woman must initially go into seclusion. They are also forced to neglect their bodies; they are not allowed to shave, shower, or change their clothing. They have to rub cow dung and palm oil on their bodies and must also sleep on the floor. Widows are also expected to wear black, the color of mourning, for two years to properly show their loss and respect for their late husband. These practices widely vary in severity and methods, based on the individual cultural backdrop. However, there has been a major decline of such practices in recent years.

Apart from mourning, the widow has immediate concerns involving living situations and property to deal with. In most cases, the eldest son and not the widow inherits the entire property. Women are culturally viewed as property and can be inherited like the rest of a husband's estate. Whether or not the widow can continue to reside on the property is dependent on her relationship with her eldest son or, if there are no sons, the eldest male relative of her husband. There have also been instances where the woman must return to her premarital home after refunding the bride price. The lack of sufficient property right makes these women dependent on men while single, married, or widowed.

Though the Nigerian Supreme Court has yet to formally deal with this issue, in the 2007 Nnanyelugo v. Nnanyelugo case, two brothers attempted to get the land of their deceased brother under the case that a widow has no business with the property. The ruling stated that they would no longer allow the males to take advantage of the vulnerable position of the widows and young children. There are other cases in which courts have ruled to implement the equality guaranteed underneath the constitution.

Because of the patrilineal nature of Nigerian cultures, it is often seen as justifiable to have another wife to ensure that there will be a male heir to carry the lineage of the family. In custody decisions, women's opinions are often ignored, and decisions are usually made in men's favor.

Women in Nigeria also face maltreation from the police and the society when they go about their business. In one of the widely condemned incidents, the Police in Federal Capital Territory arrested some set of women on 27 April 2019 after it raided night clubs in the Federal Capital Territory and committed inhumane offences against them while in detention at their station. This action led to widespread condemnation by different human rights activities and calls were made for them to be released and the officers prosecuted.

Human rights violations also include female genital mutilation, in which Nigeria accounts for the highest absolute number worldwide, affecting 27% of Nigerian women between the ages of 15 and 49 (as of 2012). Although the practice has been banned by President Goodluck Ebele Jonathan in 2015, many communities still view it as part of their tradition or as a religious requirement; uncut women are often viewed as unclean or unmarriageable.

=== Child labour and child marriage ===
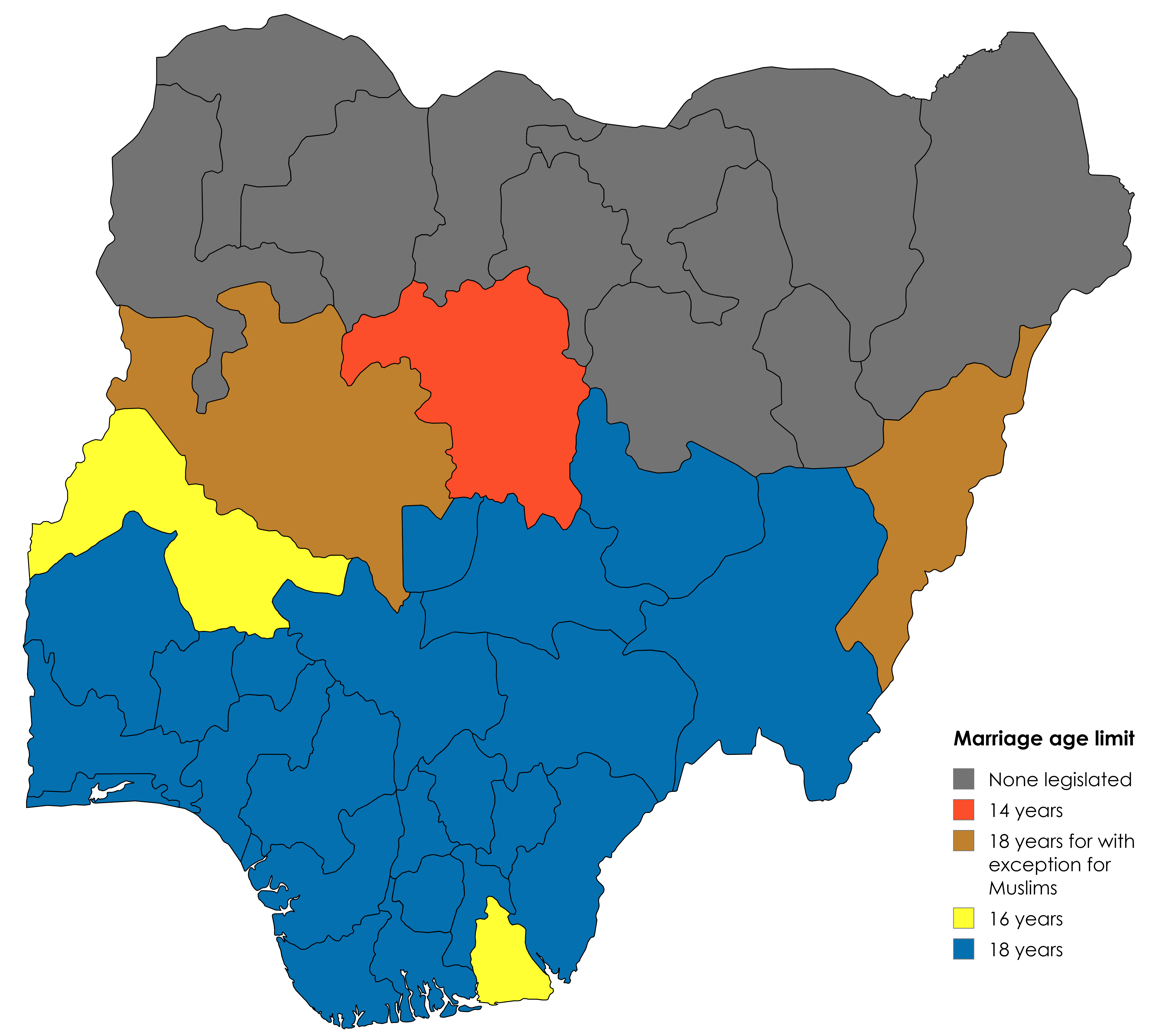
Minimum age of marriage as implemented in different states

According to the U.S. Department of Labor, 31% of Nigerian children (around 14,000,000 children) aged 5 to 14 years old are working children who engage in forced labour in various sectors. According to the International Labor Organisation, over 15 million children in Nigeria are estimated to be child labourers. According to the department's List of Goods Produced by Child Labor or Forced Labor, instances of child labour have been observed in the agricultural sector where children participate in the production of cocoa, cassava, and sand, and in the mining industry where they mine, quarry, and crush gravel and granite.

Nigeria is characterized by many small farms that largely depend on family labour in the operations of the farm. In Nigeria, most child labour is found in the informal agricultural sector. Instead of attending school, more than 50% of children living in the rural areas of Nigeria spend more than 20 hours a week working, which is considered the point at which a child's education becomes significantly affected.

Early marriage is prevalent in Nigeria, especially amongst Muslims in the north, due to the belief that early marriage prevents promiscuity. However, the major cause of early marriage has been attributed to poverty by Tim Braimah. Based on Nigeria Demographic and Health Survey (NDHS) of 2013, 58.2 per cent of Nigerian girls get married before they turn 18 years old. Moreover, from 2014 to 2020, 16% of girls aged 15 and 43% of girls aged 18 were married.

Many girls are married off by the time they are 15, and some girls are married as early as age 9. Girls are extremely susceptible to disease and domestic violence and are restricted access to education due to the early age at which they give birth and begin caring for their children.

One popular source of legislation proposed in 1991, which became national law in 2003, is the Child Rights Act. The act provides that in all matters involving a child which come before a court for adjudication, the best interest of the child is the paramount consideration. Among other factors to protect children from abuses and discrimination, Section 21 and 23 of the act made it illegal to marry off a child below the age of 18. If someone consummates a marriage with a child, it is considered rape.

The Child Rights Act competes with sharia law in some states as well as with customs and cultural expectations in different regions. The Child Rights Act has not been enacted in 13 of Nigeria's 36 states where other cultural and religious factors largely influence the laws that are enacted. Even in states with laws prohibiting child marriage, these laws have been observed to be ineffective.

=== Ethnic minorities ===
Minority ethnic groups have been fighting for equal rights since Nigeria's independence in 1960. Many of the tensions between ethnic groups arise from Nigeria's federal system, and many minorities view the governmental structure as skewed in favor of the three major ethnic groups, the Hausa-Fulani in the North, the Yoruba in the West, and the Igbo in the east. They believe that the federation is not inclusive of minorities, which leads to marginalized ethnic groups.

Since Nigeria's independence, minorities have joined together to demand the formation of new states, increasing the number of states from 12 in 1967 to the current number of 36, in the attempts to reduce the regional power of dominant ethnic groups. However, this only led to the further marginalization of smaller ethnic minorities by more powerful ethnic minorities within the state. Also, the limited presence of power-sharing mechanisms means that the national leadership of Nigeria has remained in the power of the majority ethnic groups. In recent times, because of the incessant attacks on communities along religious lines in Kaduna State, the southern and northern part of the state came together seeking for creation of a new state for the both of them. The northern part agreed for the Kaduna state to remain for them while the southern part asked for the creation of Gurara State for them. The clamour for creation of new states and divisions can be traced to long term marginalization by the governments both at the federal and state level in different parts of the country.

=== Religious minorities ===
According to its constitution, Nigeria is a secular country. The Constitution forbids the establishment of a state religion and guarantees the right to freedom of religion. Nigeria has a population roughly split in half, between Christians predominantly in the South and Muslims in the North, and with a minority population of traditional religion worshippers. Despite the clear provisions in the Constitution, Nigerian public holidays honor Christian and Muslim feast days, but not holidays of any other religion. The government subsidizes only Christian and Muslim pilgrimages and allows Christian and Muslim religious education in schools.

Since January 2000, several Northern states have institutionalized a version of Sharia law. This enactment of Sharia law has caused controversy over its violation of fundamental rights, such as the right for minorities in those states to practice their religion, the right to life, and freedom from cruel and unusual punishment.

Historically, the Nigerian Constitution has allowed Sharia courts jurisdiction over certain cases, but their jurisdiction is limited to matters of Islamic personal or family law. Several state governments in the North have extended Sharia law to criminal offenses, thereby violating the Constitution's prohibition of an official religion. These states have relied on a constitutional provision that allows the Sharia Court to exercise other jurisdiction given to it by the state in introducing Sharia penal codes. The imposition of Sharia law in certain states in Nigeria infringes on the rights of Muslims and non-Muslims alike. Muslims who would prefer to be judged under the Constitution are not able to do so, and non-Muslims are denied the right to practice their religions freely.

The severe penalties given to lesser offenses under Sharia penal laws have raised concern about their violation of rights that are protected by international human rights treaties. The International Covenant on Civil and Political Rights (ICCPR), of which Nigeria is a party, allows the death penalty if it is carried out in a way that causes the least suffering and only in the cases of serious crimes that intentionally cause lethal consequences. Under Sharia law, adultery is punished by death by stoning, which violates both conditions set forth by the ICCPR.

In southern Nigeria, especially in areas with Christian majorities, many rights are denied to Muslims as well as other religious minorities. Some educational institutions have banned the use of the hijab, which violates the right of Muslim women to practice their religion. Some state governments in the South have also denied many requests for land grants to build mosques or Islamic schools. In western Nigeria, violence erupted between parents of the Christian and Muslim denominations after Kwara State officials suspended classes at 10 historically Christian schools because of refusal to admit a female student who came with hijab to one of the Christian schools.

Throughout Nigeria, religious minorities are systematically restricted from building places of worship and schools through the denial of land grants. Members of minority religious groups are often attacked during riots and religious conflicts.

== International perspective ==
According to the U.S. Department of State,

The most serious human rights problems during ... [2011] were the abuses committed by the militant sect known as Boko Haram, which was responsible for killings, bombings, and other attacks throughout the country, resulting in numerous deaths, injuries, and the widespread destruction of property; abuses committed by the security services with impunity, including killings, beatings, arbitrary detention, and destruction of property; and societal violence, including ethnic, regional, and religious violence. Other serious human rights problems included sporadic abridgement of citizens' right to change their government, due to some election fraud and other irregularities; politically motivated and extrajudicial killings by security forces, including summary executions; security force torture, rape, and other cruel, inhuman, or degrading treatment of prisoners, detainees, and criminal suspects; harsh and life-threatening prison and detention center conditions; arbitrary arrest and detention; prolonged pretrial detention; denial of fair public trial; executive influence on the judiciary and judicial corruption; infringements on citizens' privacy rights; restrictions on freedom of speech, press, assembly, religion, and movement; official corruption; violence and discrimination against women; child abuse; female genital mutilation ...; the killing of children suspected of witchcraft; child sexual exploitation; ethnic, regional, and religious discrimination; trafficking in persons for the purpose of prostitution and forced labor; discrimination against persons with disabilities; discrimination based on sexual orientation and gender identity; vigilante killings; forced and bonded labor; and child labor.

Twelve northern states have adopted some form of Shari'a into their criminal statutes: Bauchi, Borno, Gombe, Jigawa, Kaduna, Kano, Katsina, Kebbi, Niger, Sokoto, Yobe, and Zamfara. The Shari'a criminal laws apply to those who voluntarily consent to the jurisdiction of the Shari'a courts and to all Muslims. It provides harsh sentences for, among other crimes, alcohol consumption, infidelity, same-sex sexual activity, and theft, including amputation, lashing, stoning, and long prison terms.

Some Christian pastors in Nigeria were reported in 2009 of being involved in the torturing and killing of children accused of witchcraft. In the decade ending in 2009, over 1,000 children were murdered as "witches". Those pastors, in an effort to distinguish themselves from the competition, were accused of decrying witchcraft in an effort to establish their "credentials".

== National Human Rights Commission ==
The National Human Rights Commission of Nigeria was established by the National Human Rights Commission Rights 1995 (as amended) in line with resolution 48/134 of the promotion protection and enforcement of human rights. The Commission serves as an extra judicial mechanism for the respect and enjoyment of human rights. It also provides an avenue for public enlightenment, research and dialogue in order to raise awareness on human right issues. The National Human Rights Commission is currently headed by the executive Secretary, Anthony Okechukwa Ojukwu Esq. He is also the chief executive officer.

== Human rights organizations and bodies ==
Constitutional Rights Project - founded in 1990 to promote rule of law in Nigeria.

Nigerian Center for Human Rights and Democracy - founded in 1995 to promote democracy and enforcement of rights.

Human Rights Monitor - founded in 1992 to promote human rights.

Institute for Dispute Resolution - founded in 1999 to promote peaceful conflict resolution.

Human Rights Law Services (Hurilaws) - established in 2007.

Youths For Human Rights Protection And Transparency Initiative

Street Priests Inc. – founded in 2014.

== Freedom House ratings ==
The following chart shows Nigeria's ratings since 1972 in the Freedom in the World reports, published annually by Freedom House. A rating of 1 is "most free" and 7 is "least free".

Historical ratings

Year^{a}	Political Rights	Civil Liberties	Status	President^{b}
1972	6	4	Partly Free	Yakubu Gowon
1973	6	4	Partly Free	Yakubu Gowon
1974	6	4	Partly Free	Yakubu Gowon
1975	6	5	Not Free	Murtala Mohammed
1976	6	4	Partly Free	Olusegun Obasanjo
1977	5	4	Partly Free	Olusegun Obasanjo
1978	5	3	Partly Free	Olusegun Obasanjo
1979	2	3	Free	Shehu Shagari
1980	2	3	Free	Shehu Shagari
1981	2	3	Free	Shehu Shagari
1982^{c}	2	3	Free	Shehu Shagari
1983	2	3	Free	Shehu Shagari
1984	7	5	Not Free	Muhammadu Buhari
1985	7	5	Not Free	Ibrahim Babangida
1986	7	5	Not Free	Ibrahim Babangida
1987	6	5	Not Free	Ibrahim Babangida
1988	5	5	Partly Free	Ibrahim Babangida
1989	6	5	Not Free	Ibrahim Babangida
1990	5	5	Partly Free	Ibrahim Babangida
1991	5	4	Partly Free	Ibrahim Babangida
1992	5	4	Partly Free	Ibrahim Babangida
1993	7	5	Not Free	Sani Abacha
1994	7	6	Not Free	Sani Abacha
1995	7	7	Not Free	Sani Abacha
1996	7	6	Not Free	Sani Abacha
1997	7	6	Not Free	Sani Abacha
1998	6	4	Partly Free	Abdulsalami Abubakar
1999	4	3	Partly Free	Olusegun Obasanjo
2000	4	4	Partly Free	Olusegun Obasanjo
2001	4	5	Partly Free	Olusegun Obasanjo
2002	4	5	Partly Free	Olusegun Obasanjo
2003	4	4	Partly Free	Olusegun Obasanjo
2004	4	4	Partly Free	Olusegun Obasanjo
2005	4	4	Partly Free	Olusegun Obasanjo
2006	4	4	Partly Free	Olusegun Obasanjo
2007	4	4	Partly Free	Umaru Musa Yar'Adua
2008	5	4	Partly Free	Umaru Musa Yar'Adua
2009	5	4	Partly Free	Umaru Musa Yar'Adua
2010	4	4	Partly Free	Goodluck Jonathan
2011	4	4	Partly Free	Goodluck Jonathan
2012	4	5	Partly Free	Goodluck Jonathan
2013	4	4	Partly Free	Goodluck Jonathan
2014	4	5	Partly Free	Goodluck Jonathan
2015	4	5	Partly Free	Muhammadu Buhari
2016	3	5	Partly Free	Muhammadu Buhari
2017	3	5	Partly Free	Muhammadu Buhari
2018	3	5	Partly Free	Muhammadu Buhari
2019	4	5	Partly Free	Muhammadu Buhari
2020	4	5	Partly Free	Muhammadu Buhari
2021	4	5	Partly Free	Muhammadu Buhari
2022	4	5	Partly Free	Muhammadu Buhari
Notes: a.Note that the "Year" signifies the "Year covered". Therefore the information for the year marked 2008 is from the report published in 2009, and so on. b.As of 1 January. c.The 1982 report covers the year 1981 and the first half of 1982, and the following 1984 report covers the second half of 1982 and the whole of 1983. In the interest of simplicity, these two aberrant "year and a half" reports have been split into three year-long reports through interpolation.

== International treaties ==
Nigeria's stances on international human rights treaties are as follows:

Treaties

Treaty	Organization	Introduced	Signed	Accession, Ratification
Convention on the Prevention and Punishment of the Crime of Genocide	United Nations	1948	-	2009 (A)
International Convention on the Elimination of All Forms of Racial Discrimination	United Nations	1966	-	1967 (A)
International Covenant on Economic, Social and Cultural Rights	United Nations	1966	-	1993 (A)
International Covenant on Civil and Political Rights	United Nations	1966	-	1993 (A)
First Optional Protocol to the International Covenant on Civil and Political Rights	United Nations	1966	-	-
Convention on the Non-Applicability of Statutory Limitations to War Crimes and Crimes Against Humanity	United Nations	1968	-	1970 (A)
International Convention on the Suppression and Punishment of the Crime of Apartheid	United Nations	1973	1974	1977 (R)
Convention on the Elimination of All Forms of Discrimination against Women	United Nations	1979	1984	1985 (R)
Convention against Torture and Other Cruel, Inhuman or Degrading Treatment or Punishment	United Nations	1984	1988	2001 (R)
Convention on the Rights of the Child	United Nations	1989	1990	1991 (R)
Second Optional Protocol to the International Covenant on Civil and Political Rights, aiming at the abolition of the death penalty	United Nations	1989	-	-
International Convention on the Protection of the Rights of All Migrant Workers and Members of Their Families	United Nations	1990	-	2009 (A)
Optional Protocol to the Convention on the Elimination of All Forms of Discrimination against Women	United Nations	1999	2000	2004 (R)
Optional Protocol to the Convention on the Rights of the Child on the Involvement of Children in Armed Conflict	United Nations	2000	2000	-
Optional Protocol to the Convention on the Rights of the Child on the Sale of Children, Child Prostitution and Child Pornography	United Nations	2000	2000	2010 (R)
Convention on the Rights of Persons with Disabilities	United Nations	2006	2007	2010 (R)
Optional Protocol to the Convention on the Rights of Persons with Disabilities	United Nations	2006	2007	2010 (R)
International Convention for the Protection of All Persons from Enforced Disappearance	United Nations	2006	2009	-
Optional Protocol to the International Covenant on Economic, Social and Cultural Rights	United Nations	2008	-	-
Optional Protocol to the Convention on the Rights of the Child on a Communications Procedure	United Nations	2011	-	-

== See also ==
- National Human Rights Commission (Nigeria)
- Human trafficking in Nigeria
- Internet censorship and surveillance in Nigeria
- LGBT rights in Nigeria
- Politics of Nigeria
- Communal conflicts in Nigeria
- Saving Africa's Witch Children
