= Harrison Gwamnishu =

Nigerian activist and philanthropist

- Born: Harrison Emefiena Gwamnishu; 17 July 1989 (age 37); Delta State, Nigeria
- Occupations: Activist; Philanthropist
- Years active: 2017–present
- Organization: Behind Bars Human Rights Foundation
- Awards: The Golden Stars Awards

Harrison Gwamnishu (born 17 July 1989) is a Nigerian human rights activist, and philanthropist. He is known for raising awareness about social justice issues, wrongful incarceration, legal reforms, and the well-being of prisoners.

== Early life ==
Harrison Gwamnishu was born in Ubulu Ukwu, Aniocha South Local Government Area of Delta State Nigeria.

== Career and advocacy ==
Gwamnishu rose to prominence for his advocacy work on behalf of prisoners, particularly those who have been unjustly incarcerated. Through his organization Behind Bar Human Rights Foundation, he has worked to highlight the harsh conditions faced by prisoners in Nigerian jails and to provide assistance in securing justice for individuals who have been wrongfully imprisoned. His work extends to raising awareness about human rights violations, and advocating for systemic reforms within Nigeria's legal and prison systems. Among his significant contributions is his involvement in the case of Ada Jesus, and the high-profile missing person cases of Celine Ndudim and Afiba Tandoh.

Harrison Gwamnishu entered politics as a candidate for the Labour Party during the 2023 Delta State House of Assembly elections, representing the Aniocha South Constituency. He lost the election. Afterward, he pulled out, announcing his resignation from the Labour Party, citing persistent allegations that he betrayed the party during the campaign. But later reaffirmed his commitment to the "Obidient Movement" inspired by Peter Obi. Gwamnishu thanked the party leadership for their support and pledged to cooperate with investigations to clear his name.

In August 2024, Gwamnishu was appointed Senior Special Assistant on Civil Society and Youth Mobilization to the Delta State Governor, Sheriff Oborevwori. April 25th 2025, Harrison publicly tendered his resignation as SSA to the Delta State Governor.

== Controversy ==
As a vocal advocate against human rights abuses, Gwamnishu has frequently clashed with law enforcement agencies. In 2020, he was reportedly detained by police in connection with his public criticisms of police brutality in Nigeria. In February 2024, Harrison accused officers from the Force Criminal Investigation Department (FCID) of extorting ₦3.15 million from a resident in Auchi, Edo State.

In July 2024, Harrison Gwamnishu publicly criticized Nigerian police spokesperson ACP Olumuyiwa Adejobi for remarks concerning the death of Erasmus Emeya, a 33-year-old detainee. Emeya's mother alleged that her son was tortured to death while in police custody. After Adejobi stated that Emeya died of asphyxiation and not from torture, based on an autopsy result. Gwamnishu condemned Adejobi's statements.

On 24 October 2024, the University of Nigeria Nsukka (UNN), issued a statement demanding an immediate retraction and apology from Gwamnishu for allegedly defamatory remarks about the institution. The controversy arose after he shared a video online, claiming that a student had been beaten to death by unknown assailants on the university's premises. UNN refuted these allegations, labeling them as false and damaging to the institution's reputation.

In November 2025, a couple was kidnapped at gunpoint from their home in Aviele, near Auchi, in Edo State, Nigeria, with a ransom of ₦20 million demanded. A crowdfunding was done to help with the payment of the ransom, and Gwamnishu was involved in communication with the kidnappers. Controversy arose in early December 2025 when the elder brother of the kidnapped female contended that Gwamnishu had only paid the kidnappers ₦15 million of the ransom, retaining the balance of the ransom amount requested, which Gwamnishu denied. The situation was also made public when social media influencer VeryDarkMan made claims that he reported the situation to police authorities after hearing about the case in rumors that prompted Gwamnishu's arrest. In mid-December 2025, Gwamnishu was arrested and granted bail by police authorities.

In December 2025, VeryDarkMan accused him of defrauding a property owner who wants to reclaim his land of about ₦4.4 million in a case dating back to 2023. The allegation was later disputed. He maintained that he did not work directly with the client but only referred the matter to a colleague, who he said received the money. Despite this, he stated that he took responsibility for resolving the dispute.

== Assassination attempt ==
In June 2021, Harrison Gwamnishu escaped an assassination attempt. According to his account, he was pursued by armed men in a black Hilux van marked with "Police" while driving near the Asaba International Airport. Gwamnishu noticed the vehicle trailing him and began filming the incident with his phone. The armed men, dressed in black and reportedly carrying AK-47 rifles, pointed a weapon at him and attempted to shoot. He swerved his vehicle to evade them and escaped. Gwamnishu described the incident as the second attempt on his life and called on the Delta State Police Command to investigate and identify those responsible.

== Philanthropy ==
In 2021, he started volunteering for Widows in Nigeria, a nonprofit that aims to empower people to prevent violence and promote sustainable development.

== Recognitions ==
- 2022: Nominated for Human Rights Crusader of the Year Leadership Excellence Awards. By Igbere Tv.
- 2023:Nominated for Humanitarian of the Year Nigeria Achievers Awards.
- 2024: Recognised as Human Rights Activist of the Year The Golden Stars Awards.
