= Alhaji Abdul-Azeez Arisekola Alao =

Nigerian billionaire and Islamic leader

Abdul-Azeez Arisekola Alao
- Born: Arisekola Alao; 14 February 1945; Ibadan
- Died: 18 June 2014 (aged 69); London, UK
- Burial place: Ibadan
- Citizenship: Nigeria
- Education: St. Luke's Primary School ICC Primary School in Igosun
- Occupations: Businessman; Islamic leader

Abdul-Azeez Arisekola Alao (14 February 1945 – 18 June 2014) was a Nigerian Islamic leader based in Ibadan, he was the Aare Musulumi of Yorubaland and Vice-President General, Nigeria Supreme Council for Islamic Affairs.

== Early life and education ==
Arisekola Alao was born in Adigun, a village in Ona-ara, Oyo State, to Pa Abdul Raheem Olaniyan Alao and Alhaja Olatutu Alao. He was one of seven siblings. He attended St. Luke's Primary School in the village, and ICC Primary School in Igosun. In 1960, he obtained his Primary School Leaving Certificate. That same year, he traveled to Ibadan. He was admitted to a prestigious secondary school in Ibadan, but was unable to attend as his family could not afford the tuition, nor was he able to obtain a scholarship.

== Career ==
Arisekola Alao became an apprentice trader under his uncle at Ibadan's Gbagi Market. In 1961, he incorporated his own trading company, named Azeez Arisekola Trading Company. Soon after, he became a regional manager of Imperial Chemical Industries, a British company, for Nigeria'a Western State. In 1980, he became the Aare Musulumi of Yorubaland. He was the Deputy President General of the Nigerian Supreme Council for Islamic Affairs at the time of his death. He was awarded the Commander of Niger in 2008 by president Umaru Yar’Adua.

The Ibadan based billionaire was mostly known for being a business mogul, charitable works and philanthropy. His business interests under lister conglomerate span across food production, transport, publishing, real estate, oil, flour mills, insurance, media and agriculture. At a point, he was adjudged the largest shareholder in FirstBank Plc.

He was a friend to the king of Saudi Arabia Salman bin Abdulaziz al Saud. Frequently, he was one of the privileged few honoured by the Chief Imam of Makkah to partake in cleansing of Ka'bah; an Islamic tradition Muhammad himself took part in the 7th century. This act has since been maintained and handed over from generation after generation of Islamic rulers and caliphates. He also regularly sent delegates for the annual ceremonial washing of Ka’bah. He extended annual Hajj and Umrah scholarships to thousands of Muslim faithful just as he sponsored Christian pilgrims to Jerusalem annually too.

== Recognition ==
In 1980 at the age of 35, Arisekola Alao was turbaned the first Aare Musulumi of Yorubaland, by the League of Imams and Alfas in Yorubaland, Edo, and Delta In 2006, late Olubadan of Ibadanland, Oba Yinusa Bankole Oladoja Ogundipe, Arapasowu I made him Aare of Ibadanland. He later established the AbdulAzeez Arisekola Mosque on Iwo Road, Ibadan, Oyo State.

== Personal life ==
Arisekola Alao was married to and had children with multiple women. His first wife, who was born in 1945, died in 2013. Two weeks after Arisekola Alao's death, another wife, Jelilat, died in early July 2014 following a car accident.He had over 30 children in his lifetime.

== Death and legacy ==
He died in his sleep in his London, UK home on 18 June 2014, aged 69. He was buried at his home in Ibadan two days later. His funeral was attended by many dignitaries including President Goodluck Jonathan, Alaffin of Oyo, Oba Otudeko, politicians Abiola Ajimobi, Bola Tinubu and Bode George, and musician King Sunny Ade. Ajimobi remarked "Aare was to the Nigerian masses what the late President Nelson Mandela was to the South Africans". Both President Muhammadu Buhari and former Vice President Atiku Abubakar received the news of Arisekola’s passing away "with deep shock". President Buhari added "he would be remembered as a caring community (leader), devoted Muslim who dedicated his time and great wealth to the promotion and propagation of Islam".

The Oyo State government declared a week-long mourning period following Arisekola Alao's death and a subsequent public holiday hereafter.
