= Omoseye Bolaji =

Nigerian writer (1968–2022)

Omoseye Bolaji (16 August 1964 – 22 May 2022) was a Nigerian writer who contributed to the growth of African literature in South Africa, especially in the Free State. Bolaji has been editor of South African publications including Free State News, Kopanang magazine, E and E magazine, and CHOICE magazine.

== Early life ==
Bolaji grew up in England, Nigeria, and Sierra Leone. He took secondary school at Lagelu Grammar School in Ibadan, Nigeria, and later studied at Nigeria's Obafemi Awolowo University.

== Critical analysis ==
Analysts of Bolaji's books (in some of the published studies referred to below) point out that he has been heavily influenced by writers such as Sidney Sheldon, Dick Francis and Agatha Christie, who highlight the unexpected in their work. For examples in Impossible Love, an intriguing gentleman suddenly finds himself inadvertently in love with his daughter; in People of the Townships, young man readers have come to empathize with is ultimately exposed as a cold-blooded murderer; and in Tebogo Investigates, a charming, amiable young lady turns out to be a ruthless killer.

Studies already published on Omoseye Bolaji's literary work are: Omoseye Bolaji: His writings/his role as a catalyst for FS Writing. By Pule Lebuso (2001); Omoseye Bolaji: Perspectives on his literary work. By Flaxman Qoopane (2003); Omoseye Bolaji: Channelling one's thoughts onto paper. By Charmaine Kolwane (2005); Tebogo on the prowl: a study of Omoseye Bolaji's series of books based on private sleuth, Tebogo Mokoena. By Petro Schonfeld (2006). The Triumph (2007) ISBN 978 - 0 - 620 - 38207 - 6 written by Urbain Tila, details the events at the gala night where Omoseye Bolaji received the Lifetime Achievement Award. Recent studies on his literary work include Omoseye Bolaji: Further perspectives (2009) by Julia Mooi, OMOSEYE BOLAJI (2010) by Hector Kunene, and BOLAJI IN HIS POMP (2013) by Pule Lechesa.

== Awards and honours ==
Bolaji's awards and honours include: Sports Writer of the Year (2000), courtesy of the Eclectic Writers Club of Bloemfontein; recipient of the Community Publishing Project (CPP) grant (2003) from Cape Town's Centre for the Book; Free State Author of the Year (2003) for his novel, People of the Townships; Certificate for penning enthralling Fiction (2006), courtesy of Phoenix Literary Club, Ladybrand; and the "Lifetime Achievement Award" (2007) from the Free State Department of Sport, Art and Culture. In September 2007, the University of the Free State conferred the Chancellor's Medal on Omoseye Bolaji, in appreciation of his contributions to grassroots literacy and literature. Bolaji has also been conferred with an African Chieftaincy by the Olubadan of Ibadanland in Nigeria, again for his contributions to African literature. In 2009 the Mangaung Local Municipality honoured him "In Recognition of Valuable Contributions to Literature in the Free State". Bolaji was presented with another Lifetime Achievement award at the formal Mbali Literary Awards (2012) in Clocolan. Omoseye Bolaji has also been honoured with the 'Exquisite Calabash' in Ikire, Nigeria (2020).

== Bibliography ==
=== Stand-alone novels ===
- The Termagant (1988)
- They Never Say When (1994)
- Impossible Love (2000)
- The Ghostly Adversary (2001)
- The Guillotine (2001)
- People of the Townships (2003)

=== Tebogo Mokoena Mystery series ===
- Tebogo Investigates (2000)
- Tebogo's spot of bother (2001)
- Tebogo Fails (2003)
- Ask Tebogo (2004)
- Tebogo and the Haka (2008)
- Tebogo and the epithalamion (2009)
- Tebogo and the pantophagist (2010)
- Tebogo and the Bacchae (2012)
- Tebogo and Uriah Heep (2018)

=== Other works ===
- Eagles at USA 94 (1994)
- Snippets (1998, poetry)
- The story of Collins Mokhotho (2000)
- Fillets of Plaice (2000)
- Thoughts on Free State Writing (2002)
- Molebogeng Alitta Mokhuoa (2004)
- My Opinion (2005)
- Reverie (2006, poetry)
- The Subtle Transgressor (2006, play)
- Poems from Mauritius (2007, poetry)
- My Life and Literature (2007)
- Miscellaneous Writings (2011)
- It Couldn't Matter Less (2013)
- Kunle Apantaku (2013, essay)
- Windmills of the Dames (2014)
- Far Up! Far Out! Far More! (2014)
- Cognoscenti (2016)
- Sorry You've been Troubled (2017)
- Calamity Angst (2020)
- WILDFLOWER: Intriguing tv series (2021)
- BOOKS BARDS AND BARBS (2022)
- IYA ALAJE (2022)
