= National Defense and Security Council =

National Defense (or Defence) and Security Council may refer to:

- National Defense and Security Council (Vietnam)
- National Defence and Security Council (Myanmar)
