= Bolaji Odofin =

Bolaji Odofin is a prize-winning Nigerian playwright. A journalist and former magazine publisher, Odofin currently works in the not-for-profit sector.
