= Ekpo Una Owo Nta =

Nigerian lawyer (born 1952)

Ekpo Una Owo Nta is a Nigerian lawyer and Chairman of the Independent Corrupt Practices and Other Related Offences Commission (ICPC).

== Early years ==
Ekpo Una Owo Nta was born in Ndukpoise, Nsit Ubium Local Government Area of Akwa Ibom State on 12 October 1952. He started his primary education at Zaria, Kaduna State in 1958 and finally finished at St. Anthony`s Primary School in Ibadan, Oyo State in 1964.

In September 1964, he commenced his Secondary School at Loyola College, Ibadan and completed at Hope Waddel Training Institute, Calabar in 1971.

== Background ==
Between 1972 and 1980, he attended the University of Ibadan where he attended the preliminary Science Programme in Chemistry, Physics and Botany. He later obtained a B.Sc. (Hons) in Political Science majoring in International Relations in 1977, and an M.Sc. Political Science majoring in Public Policy and Statistics in 1980.

He also obtained LL.B. (Hons) Civil Law majoring in Public International Institutions at the University of Calabar between 1983 and 1987. He attended the Nigerian Law School, Lagos in 1987 and was called to the Nigerian Bar as a Solicitor and Advocate of the Supreme Court of Nigeria in 1988.

== Public service career ==
He had served as a Producer/Editor in Nigerian Television Authority in Kano producing special documentaries especially on youth and community development matters in 1977. In addition he anchored several discussion programmes.

Between 1978 and 1985 he served as a Human Resources and Training Officer in the Cross River State Water Board where he rose up to become a Management level Officer and Ag. Secretary of the Board. In the latter position he was part of the team that initiated and managed several urban and rural potable water supply schemes in the State for over 7 million citizens in addition to designing training and career programmes for young Engineers, hydro geologists and other professionals in the public water industry.

He was appointed as a Senior Assistant Registrar of the University of Cross River (now University of Uyo) in 1986 where he served until 1987. He was responsible for setting up a modern Examination Records Department for the newly established University as its Records Officer. He was responsible for the final collation of all examination results in the university, advising the Senate on examination records, production of manuals, new processes, and the issuance of transcripts to third parties. When new States were created in Nigeria, he subsequently moved on to serve as the Head, Personnel, Manpower Development & Training in the newly established Akwa Ibom State Water Corporation, Uyo.

Mr. Nta served as counsel with the Ministry of Justice, Uyo and later as the Deputy Liaison Officer/Lawyer at the Office of the Akwa Ibom State Military Governor, Lagos in 1989. In these capacities he was responsible for rendering legal advice to government, taking part in arbitration matters and also providing intergovernmental and consular services at the Liaison Office.

In 1990 he was appointed Chief Administrative Officer and a Management Staff of the Akwa Ibom State Agricultural Development Project, Uyo. This Agency was a collaboration between the Federal and State Governments and the World Bank designed to introduce modern farming methods and commercial processes to local farmers.

From March 1993 to June 2010 he worked with the Oil Mineral Producing Areas Development Commission (OMPADEC) now referred to as Niger Delta Development Commission NDDC as Director of Administration and Human Resource Development. In this Agency he was part of the Management Team that developed and implemented security services, human resources and physical infrastructure for the petroleum-rich but environmentally degraded/polluted Niger Delta region of Nigeria.

== Independent Corrupt Practices and Other Related Offences Commission ==
Mr. Nta was sworn in as a Board Member/Acting Chairman of the Independent Corrupt Practices and Other Related Offences Commission (ICPC) in November 2011 and was appointed substantive Chairman on 17 October 2012 by President Goodluck Jonathan for a five-year term following the concurrence of the Senate of the Federal Republic of Nigeria.

In March 2015, ICPC made public the status of criminal cases within its precinct as at March 2015. The list contained 267 criminal cases between 2001 and 2015, and 142 civil cases between 2007 and 2015.

== Professional bodies ==
Mr. Nta has attended many Professional Courses within and outside Nigeria and is also a member of Professional bodies like the International Association of Prosecutors, Nigerian Bar Association (NBA), Nigerian Association for Public Administration and Management, etc.

He is the proprietor of a Nursery/Primary School in Uyo Nigeria founded in 2001 to provide good quality early child education especially for disadvantaged children in the State.

In December 2015, Mr. Ekpo Nta was elected as one of the seven new members of the Board of Governors of the International Anti-Corruption Academy (IACA), Austria.

He was elected into the IACA Board of Governors to represent the African Regional Group during the Assembly of State Parties Conference of the International Anti-Corruption Academy (IACA) in Vienna, Austria. He is the first African and Nigerian to be so elected - an international acknowledgement of upsurge of Nigeria’s prevention activities in the anti-corruption fight.
