= Bolaji Ramos =

Nigerian poet and lawyer

Bolaji S. Ramos is a Nigerian poet, writer, analyst and lawyer.

== Biography ==
A Lagosian, born in Lagos Island and grew up in Lagos Mainland. He attended Ladi-Lak institute Primary School, Alagomeji, Yaba, Lagos Nigeria. He proceeded to Lagos City College, Sabo, Yaba, Lagos (now Lagos City Senior College) until he finished his secondary school education.

== Career ==
He is a lawyer by profession. He obtained his Bachelor of Laws (LL.B) and Master of Laws (LL.M) degrees in University of Lagos, Nigeria. His poems have featured both in national and international anthologies, newspapers and on the internet. His poems were published variously in the UK by the Forward Poetry in 2005, 2006, 2008 and 2011; by the Poetry Institute of South Africa in Venturing Vista in 2007 and by Bulkybon Publication, Nigeria in 2016.

In 2006, his poem was shortlisted and published in the anthology titled ‘Camouflage: Best Contemporary Writings In Nigeria.’ His renowned poem titled “Law” was published in 2011 in the Nation Newspaper, and that same year he featured online as one of the 742 United Nations Peace Poets.

His poem titled "Another Verse for Bola", a suggestive love (birthday) poem written in 2010 was shortlisted as one of the best love poems and published by Forward Poetry UK. In 2016, Ramos wrote a very popular poetic rejoinder to Professor Niyi Osundare's poem that satirized the Nigerian Judiciary and legal profession titled "My Lord, Where Should I keep Your Bribe". Ramos's rejoinder is titled "Judicial Response" or Right of Reply", and was published by Premium Times.

Bolaji. S. Ramos has written across the three genres of literature. He has published some his poem at different times using Bolaji Ramos, Bolaji Salau Ramos, Bolaji St.Ramos and recently as Bolaji S.Ramos.

On 20 June 2017, Ramos published his full length performance poetry book titled "The Battlefield Poet: Elegy for Christopher Okigbo is his first full-length published work." The Battlefield Poet: Elegy for Christopher Okigbo is a book that x-rays the involvement and enlistment of one of Africa's best contemporary poets (Christopher Okigbo) in the Nigerian Civil War that broke out in 1967 between the Federal Republic of Nigeria and the seceding Biafra Nation. As a promising poet whose popularity and poetry works were already widespread across the world as at 1967, a lot of critics hold the view that Okigbo ought not to have abandoned poetry and enlisted in the Biafran army. Okigbo was killed in the wake of the war in 1967.

The book is a philosophical work that tells the story of how a circle of three poets (the initiates) journeyed from the world of man to the metaphysical realm in an attempt to see Okigbo again by summoning his spirit and putting questions to him for him to answer. It is performance poetry that is embellished with a lot of adages, traditional igbo war and sorrowful songs and other ritualistic and poetic incantations.
