= Bolaji Owasanoye =

Nigerian lawyer and human rights activist

Bolaji Owasanoye SAN
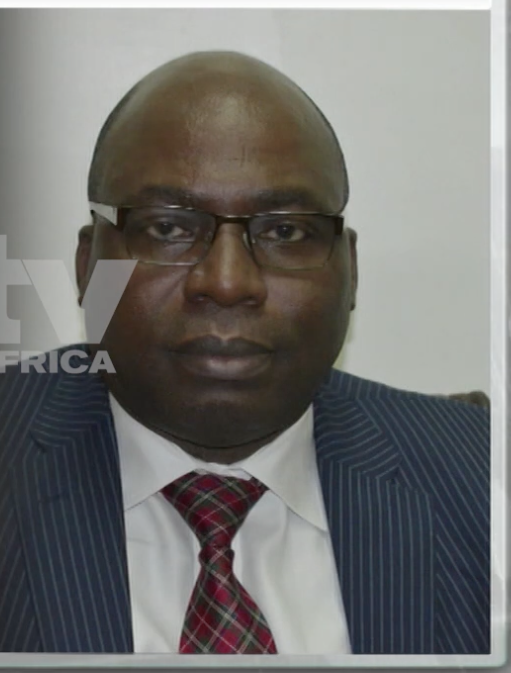

Chairman of Independent Corrupt Practices and other Related Offences Commission, ICPC
- Incumbent
- Assumed office January 2018
- President: Muhammadu Buhari
- Preceded by: Ekpo Nta

Personal details
- Education: University of Ife; University of Lagos
- Occupation: Lawyer human rights activist
- Awards: University of Lagos Scholarship Award (1986/1987), UN Institute for Training and Research Fellowship Award (1991, 1994), US Information Service International Visitors Award (1991), British Council Fellowship Award (1992), Senior Special Fellowship, United Nations Institute for Training and Research (2001).

Bolaji Olufunmileyi Owasanoye is a Nigerian lawyer and human rights activist. He currently serves as the Chairman of the Independent Corrupt Practices and other Related Offences Commission, ICPC, an anticorruption agency in Nigeria.

== Early life and education ==
Owasanoye was born in 1963. He graduated from University of Ife in 1984 with a degree in law and was called to the Nigerian Bar in 1985. He also obtained a master's degree in Law in 1987 from the University of Lagos.

== Career ==
Owasanoye started his career as an assistant lecturer at the University of Lagos. He moved to the National Institute of Advanced Legal Studies (NIALS) in 1991 and became a Professor of law 10 years later.

In August 2015, he was appointed as the Executive Secretary of the Presidential Advisory Committee Against Corruption (PACAC) before being appointed to the ICPC. He was a proponent of the Proceeds of Crime bill, Whistle-blower and Witness Protection Bill passed by the Nigerian National Assembly.

He has also worked as a consultant for Nigerian federal and state agencies as well as international agencies such as the World Bank and USAID.

In 1997, he co-founded the Human Development Initiative (HDI), a non-profit organisation. In 2020, he was awarded the rank of Senior Advocate of Nigeria (SAN).

== Publications ==
- The regulation of child custody and access in Nigeria
- Fearing the dark: The use of witchcraft to control human trafficking victims and sustain vulnerability
- Improving Case Management Coordination Amongst the Police, Prosecution and Court
- NIALS Laws of Nigeria: Evidence Act 2011
- NIALS Laws of Nigeria: Electoral Act
- Information and communication technologies (ICT), freedom of information and privacy rights in Nigeria: an assessment

== Awards and recognition ==
- University of Lagos Scholarship Award (1986/1987)
- UN Institute for Training and Research Fellowship Award (1991, 1994)
- US Information Service International Visitors Award (1991)
- British Council Fellowship Award (1992)
- Senior Special Fellowship, United Nations Institute for Training and Research (2001)
- Officer of the Federal Republic OFR (2002)
