= Mustapha Akanbi (academic) =

Nigerian professor

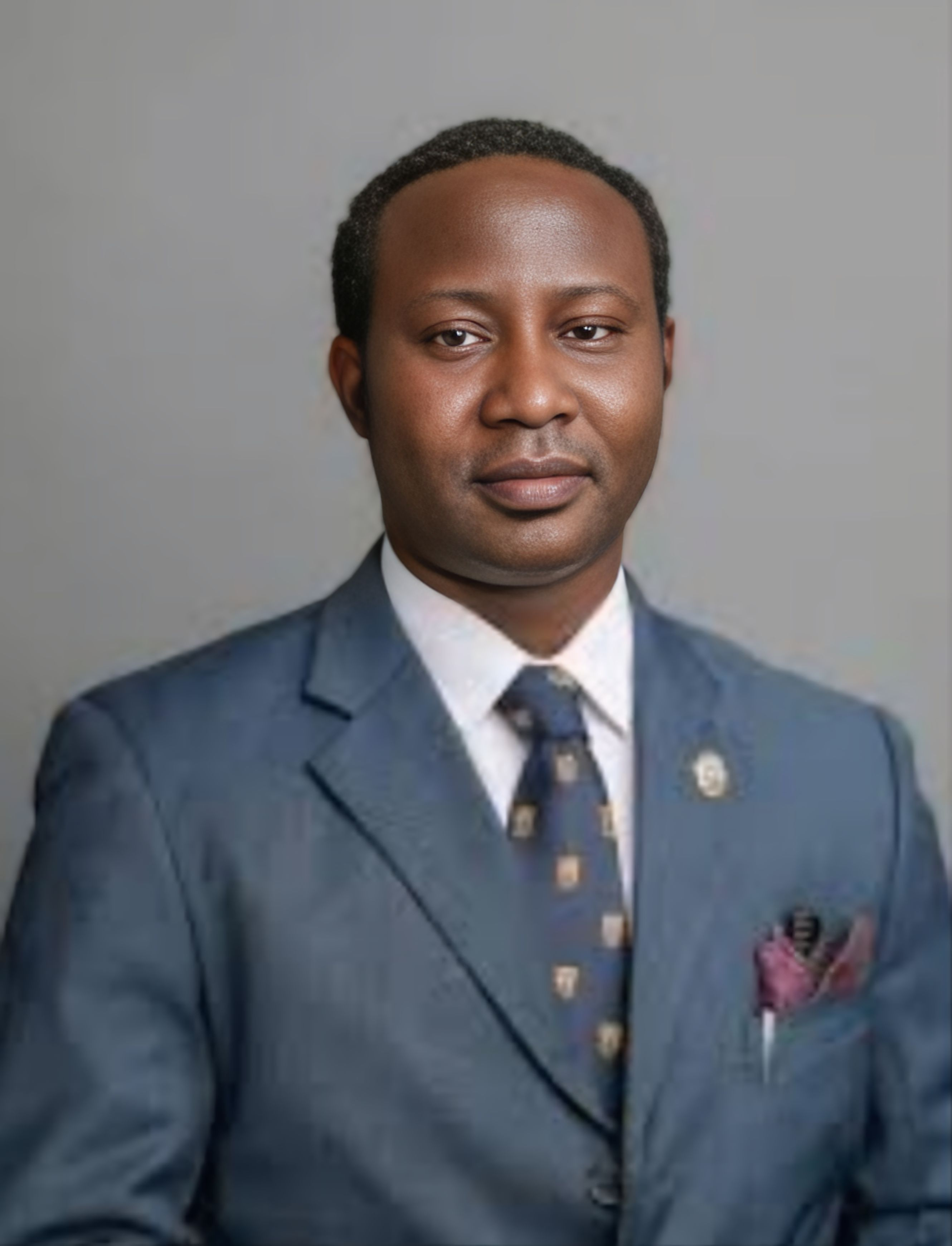
Mohammed Mustapha Olaroungbe Akanbi Muhammad Mustapha Olaroungbe Akanbi SAN
- Born: 24 January 1971
- Died: 24 January 2022 (aged 51); Ilorin, Kwara State
- Burial place: No 6, Agba Dam Street, off Ahmadu Bello Way, GRA, Ilorin, Kwara State
- Occupations: Academics, Lawyer; Researcher
- Father: Mustapha Akanbi

Academic background
- Education: Obafemi Awolowo University, Ile-Ife; University of Lagos, University of London

Muhammad Mustapha Olaroungbe Akanbi SAN (24 January 1971 – 20 November 2022) was a Nigerian professor of Law and the former vice chancellor of Kwara State University. He was a member of the Senior Advocate of Nigeria and the Nigeria Bar Association.

== Early life and education ==
Mustapha Akanbi was born in 1971 at Ile Magaji Kemberi, Awodi, Gambari Quarters, Ilorin East, Kwara State of Nigeria to Mustapha Akanbi, a Nigerian civil servant. He obtained his West African School Certificate from Federal Government College Okigwe in 1989. He obtained his first degree in law from Obafemi Awolowo University in 1993. He graduated from Nigerian Law School in 1995 and was also called to the bar in the same year. In 1998, he completed his master's degree in law from the University of Lagos in 1998 and earned a doctorate degree from University of London's King's College London, United Kingdom in 2006.

== Career ==
=== Academic career ===
Mustapha Akanbi started his academic as a lecturer at the faculty of Law of the University of Ilorin and he became of professor in 2012. Akanbi was a former head of the Department of Business Law, and Dean of faculty of Law at the University of Ilorin and was until his death, the vice-chancellor of Kwara State University, Malete.

=== Legal career ===
Mustapha Akanbi served the country as a legal assistant in the legal department of the Central Bank of Nigeria in Lagos from 1995 to 1996 as part of his service year. In the legal firms Gafar & Co, Ilorin and Wole Bamgbala & Co, Lagos, Olawoyin and Olawoyin, Lagos and Ayodele, respectively, he worked as a junior between March 1996 and 1998.

== Memberships and fellowships ==
He became a member of the Nigerian Bar Association in 1995 and a member of the Senior Advocate of Nigeria in 2018.

== Selected publications ==
- Corruption and the challenges of good governance in Nigeria;
- Customary arbitration in Nigeria: a review of extant judicial parameters and the need for paradigm shift (2015);
