= National Human Rights Commission (Nigeria) =

National human rights institution overview
- Formed: 1995
- Jurisdiction: Federal Government of Nigeria
- Headquarters: Abuja, Nigeria
- Supervising authority responsible: Attorney General of the Federation
- National human rights institution executive: Anthony O. Ojukwu, Executive Secretary; Chairman
- Parent department: Federal Government of Nigeria
- Website: nigeriarights.gov.ng

The National Human Rights Commission of Nigeria (“the NHRC”), affiliated with the African Commission on Human and Peoples’ Rights, was established by the National Human Rights Commission (Amendment) Act of 1995 to promote and protect all human rights in Nigeria. The Commission serves as an extra-judicial mechanism that safeguards the human rights of the Nigerian population. It monitors human rights in Nigeria, assists victims of human rights violations, and helps in the formulation of the Nigerian Government's policies on human rights. This institution was initiated to comply with the demands of the African Charter on Human and Peoples Rights, United Nations Charter, Universal Declaration on Human Rights and other international treaties to which Nigeria is a signatory. In 2010, it was amended to accommodate quasi-judicial powers to summon persons, acquire evidence, award compensation and enforce decisions. The power to visit any place of detention without violating detainees’ rights is also recognized in the act.

The commission with over 20 branches across Nigeria, has a Governing Council of 16 members consisting of a chairman, usually a retired Justice of the Supreme Court of Nigeria or the Court of Appeal or a retired Judge of the High Court of a State and an Executive Secretary. The current Executive Secretary is Anthony O. Ojukwu Esq. Council members are appointed by the President on the recommendation of the Attorney General of the Federation. The commission executes its mandate through the establishment of a National Action Plan which features effective complaint mechanism, enlightenment seminars, workshops, rallies and continuous reengineering of its strategies. Aside upholding human rights, It creates avenue for research and awareness on human rights issues in Nigeria. In post conflict situations, the commission advocates for the rights of vulnerable groups such as women, children and Internally Displaced Persons (IDP); call out defaulters; investigate abuses; establish dialogues and human rights centred negotiations; collaborations for effective post conflict performance; evaluate government’s post conflict actions and policies and obtaining justice and reparation for victims of conflict.

The Commission has been active in the investigation and monitoring of numerous human rights situations since its founding. Amnesty International raised concerns about intimidation of the National Human Rights Commission by the Nigeria Police Force in 2012.

== Functional Units ==
- Council Secretariat
- Internal Audit
- Complaints Registry
- Information & Communication Technology

== Executive Secretary ==
- Dr Bukhari Bello, mni, MFR
- Mrs. K. F. Ajoni
- Mr. Roland Ewubare
- Prof Bem Angwe
- Dr Anthony Ojukwu

== See also ==
- Human rights in Nigeria
- The Human Rights Violation Investigation Commission of Nigeria
