= Independent Corrupt Practices Commission =

Nigerian anticorruption agency

The Independent Corrupt Practices and Other Related Offenses Commission (ICPC) is a Nigerian agency that was inaugurated on 29 September 2000 following the recommendation of President Olusegun Obasanjo. The mandate is to receive and investigate reports of corruption and in appropriate cases prosecute the offender(s), to examine, review and enforce the correction of corruption prone systems and procedures of public bodies, with a view to eliminating corruption in public life, and to educate and enlighten the public on and against corruption and related offences with a view to enlisting and fostering public support for the fight against corruption. The Corrupt Practices and other Related Offences Act 2000 governs the committee's activities.

== Relationship with other organizations ==
In 2003, the Economic and Financial Crimes Commission (EFCC) was established as a law enforcement agency to investigate financial crimes such as advance fee fraud (419 fraud) and money laundering. While the ICPC targets corruption in the public sector, especially bribery, gratification, graft, and abuse or misuse of office, the EFCC investigates people in all sectors who appear to be living above their means, and is empowered to investigate and prosecute money laundering and other financial crimes. The EFCC tracks illicit wealth accruing from abuse of office, especially attempts to integrate such wealth into the financial system. There have been tensions between the two commissions. The ICPC chairman, Justice Emmanuel Ayoola, has complained about duplication of the functions of ICPC by the EFCC, particularly overlap between the ICPC Anti-Corruption and Transparency Monitoring Units and the EFCC Anti-Corruption and Transparency Committees.

The Association of Certified Anti-Money Laundering Specialists (ACAMS) is a global organization of professionals dedicated to controlling and preventing money laundering and terrorist financing. In June 2009, ACAMS established a Nigerian chapter in Lagos. The Chairman of the ICPC, Justice Emmanuel Ayoola, said the ICPC was looking forward to a fruitful partnership with ACAMS in the campaign against corruption and all other related crimes. The commission works with other international bodies such as the United Nations Committee on Anti-Corruption (UNCAC), Transparency International, and the African Union (AU) Convention Against Corruption.

In September 2009, a Federal High Court judge refused a request to issue a mandamus order compelling the ICPC and the EFCC to investigate and prosecute the FCT Minister, Senator Adamu Aliero, over alleged diversion of N10.2 billion public funds while he held office as Kebbi State governor. The court explained it did not have authority to compel the agencies to act.

== 2009 review of mandate ==
In June 2009 the Senate Committee on Drugs, Narcotics and Anti-Corruption moved to amend the Acts setting up the ICPC and the EFCC so as to guarantee independence from the executive. Two of the proposals were to give the EFCC Chair a legally stipulated tenure of four years, and to require Senate approval for removal of members of either commission. A merger of the two agencies was also considered. At public hearings on the amendments, Senate President David Mark expressed concern that the EFCC and the ICPC would have too much power without another body supervising their work. However, the EFCC Chairman, Farida Waziri said it was important for anti-corruption agencies to remain independent of politicians, whom they often investigated. She expressed concern that the proposed amendment would rather limit than enhance the effectiveness of the agencies.

== Chairmen ==
Name	Role	Start	End	Notes
Justice Mustapha Akanbi	Chairman	2000	2005	
Justice Emmanuel Ayoola	Chairman	2005	2010	
Professor Uriah Angulu	Acting Chairman		March 2011	
Dr. Rose Abang-Wushishi	Acting Chairman	March 2011	August 2011	
Barrister Abdullahi Bako	Acting Chairman	August 2011	November 2011	
Barrister Ekpo Una Owo Nta	Acting Chairman	November 2011	June 2012	
Barrister Ekpo Una Owo Nta	Chairman	June 2012	January 2018	
Prof. Bolaji Owasanoye	Chairman	January 2018	2023	
Dr. Musa Adamu Aliyu, SAN	Chairman	December 13th, 2023	Till date	[29]

== Prosecutions ==
In the first three years of its existence, the ICPC received a total of 942 petitions. In August 2003 about 400 of the petitions were under investigation, and about 60 were at various stages of prosecution. After the first four years, however, the ICPC had failed to make any major convictions. Justice Akanbi blamed the lack of progress in part on severe underfunding, in part on the fact that the commission was not authorized to investigate corrupt activity prior to the date the ICPC was founded.

The ICPC has prosecuted a number of prominent Nigerians. Some examples are Ghali Umar Na'Abba, speaker of the House of Representatives (2002), Fabian Osuji, head of the Nigerian Federal Ministry of Education (2006).

In June 2004, Justice Mustapha Akanbi said that although several petitions had been written against state governors, the ICPC was not empowered to investigate governors involved in corrupt practices. However, in August 2008 Emmanuel Ayoola said the commission would soon issue a list of former state governors found to have violated the provisions of the ICPC Act 2000. He noted that some of them were already being prosecuted for money laundering, and said the ICPC was scrutinising the file to see whether there are cases they could pursue.

In August 2009 the ICPC started investigations into an alleged N90 billion fraud leveled against managers of Pension Fund for retirees in the health sector. In September 2009, the ICPC summoned officials of the Ministry of Education linked with the alleged mismanagement of N1 billion meant for the Education Reform Programme.

In March 2015, ICPC made public the status of criminal cases within its precinct as at March 2015. The list contained 267 criminal cases between 2001 and 2015, and 142 civil cases between 2007 and 2015.

== Controversies ==
=== "Theft is not corruption" ===
The Chairman Ekpo Nta narrowed the meaning of corruption by government officials: "Stealing is erroneously reported as corruption. We must go back to what we were taught at school to show that there are educated people in Nigeria. We must address issues as we were taught in school to do."

It followed the previous similar announcement by the Nigerian President Goodluck: "What many Nigerians refer to as corruption is actually stealing. Stealing is not the same thing as corruption."
