= Mustapha Akanbi (jurist) =

Nigerian lawyer and judge (1932–2018)

Muhammad Mustapha Adebayo Akanbi
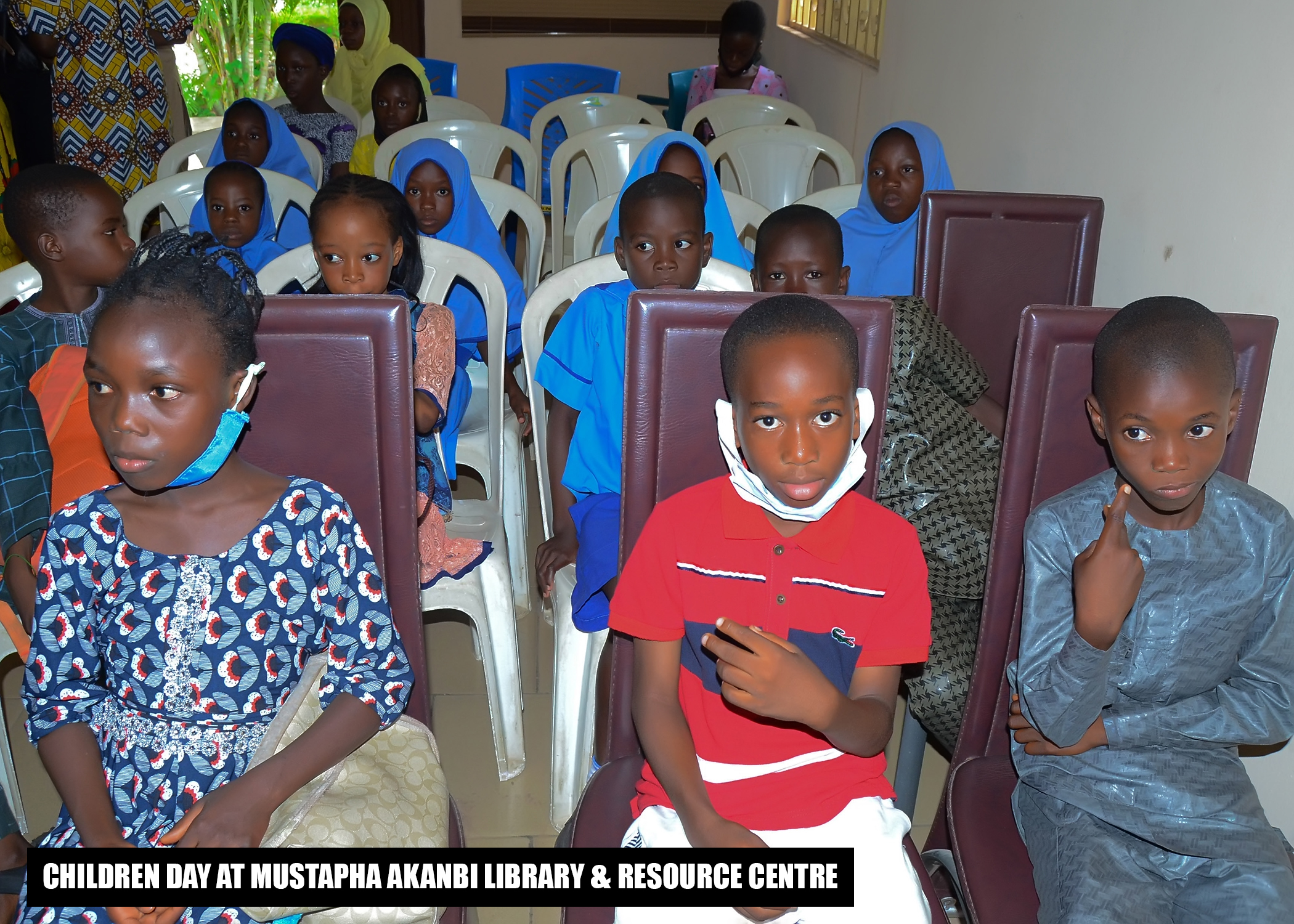
- Born: Muhammad Mustapha Adebayo Akanbi; 11 September 1932; Accra, Ghana
- Died: 3 June 2018 (aged 85)
- Education: Ahmadu Bello University
- Occupations: lawyer; judge
- Notable work: Served as President of the Nigerian Courts of Appeal (1992–1999); Inaugural head of Nigeria's Independent Corrupt Practices Commission (2000–2005)

Muhammad Mustapha Adebayo Akanbi (11 September 1932 – 3 June 2018) was a Nigerian lawyer and judge, who served as President of the Nigerian Court of Appeal (1992–1999) and inaugural head of Nigeria's Independent Corrupt Practices Commission (2000–2005) before his death in 2018 at the age of 85.

== Early years ==
Muhammad Mustapha Adebayo Akanbi was born on 11 September 1932 at Accra, Ghana, to Muslim parents from Ilorin in Nigeria. After completing secondary school he worked as an executive officer in the Ghana Civil Service. He was also active as a trade unionist. Moving to Nigeria, he worked in the School Broadcasting Department of the Ministry of Education.

== Career ==
Akanbi obtained a scholarship to study law at the Institute of Administration, now Ahmadu Bello University, Zaria, followed by legal studies in the United Kingdom. He was called to the English Bar in 1963, and was called to the Nigerian Bar in January 1964. He joined the Ministry of Justice and became a Senior State Counsel in 1968. In 1969 he set up in private practice in Kano. In 1974 he was appointed a judge of the Federal Revenue Court, and in January 1977 he was elevated to the Court of Appeal Bench. In 1992 he was made President of the Nigerian Court of Appeal, a position he held until retiring in 1999.

Muhammad Mustapha Olaroungbe Akanbi, his son was also a lawyer who became the Chairman of the Ilorin branch of the Nigerian Bar Association.

== Independent Corrupt Practices Commission ==
In 2000 President Olusegun Obasanjo appointed Akanbi as chairman of the newly established Independent Corrupt Practices Commission (ICPC). By 2004, the ICPC had failed to obtain any significant convictions, and Akanbi publicly questioned why the government had set up the ICPC and appointed competent people to run it "only to frustrate it from performing by starving it of funds". He said that another issue was that the law forbade it from investigating corrupt practices dating before the creation of the ICPC. In March 2004, Akanbi urged parliamentarians to ratify the United Nations and the African Union Conventions Against Corruption, which would greatly assist the struggle against corruption.

As of July 2005, the ICPC charged 85 people but had only secured two corruption-related convictions. Commenting on this record, Akbani said he suspected that some judges had been paid off to toss out cases. In September 2005 Akanbe said, "Corruption has been described as a cankerworm, a malaise that has afflicted our nation and done havoc to our corporate existence". He attributed the problem to lack of will by past military leaders to fight corruption, inconsistency in government policies, and reluctance by law enforcement agencies to arrest and prosecute "sacred cows".

== In retirement ==
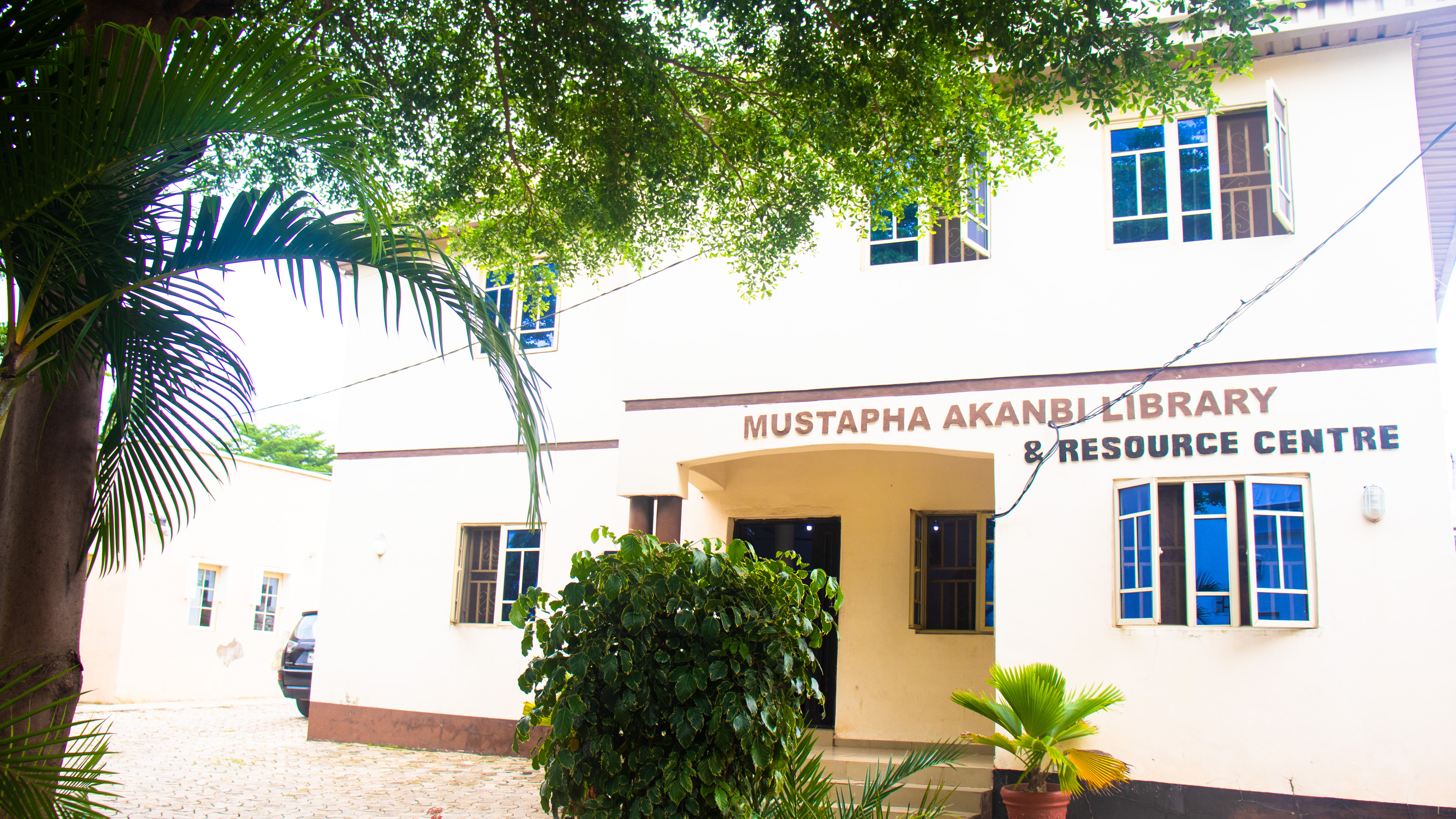
The Mustapha Akanbi Library and Resource Centre

Akanbi retired in 2005 on completion of the first term of office. He joined the board of the Justice and Law Enforcement Reformation Organization, a non-profit organization that aims to eradicate corruption and poverty from the perspective of the Judiciary and Law Enforcement agencies. In 2006, Akanbi established the Mustapha Akanbi Foundation in Ilorin, Kwara State, dedicated to strengthening civil society groups, governmental agencies and private business concerns and helping them imbibe a culture of transparency and accountability.

In August 2009 he called on Nigerian Muslims to shun the ideas of the Boko Haram sect, which teaches that non-Islamic education is a sin. He said that both Western and Islamic education were germane to the development of mankind.

In November 2016, the Mustapha Akanbi Library and Resource Centre was officially unveiled by Professor Lenrie Aina as a private library which opened its vaults of resources to the public in Ilorin.
