= Alfred Sharland =

English cricketer and civil servant

Personal information
- Full name: Alfred Percival Sharland
- Born: 24 October 1890; Croydon, Surrey, England
- Died: 18 July 1944 (aged 53); Locksbottom, Kent, England
- Batting: Right-handed
- Bowling: Leg break

Career statistics
Competition	First-class
Matches	1
Runs scored	2
Batting average	1.00
100s/50s	0/0
Top score	2
Balls bowled	96
Wickets	1
Bowling average	67.00
5 wickets in innings	0
10 wickets in match	0
Best bowling	1/67
Catches/stumpings	0/–
- Source: Cricinfo, 17 February 2019

Alfred Percival Sharland (24 October 1890 – 18 July 1944) was an English first-class cricketer and civil servant.

Sharland was born at Croydon. He joined HM Customs and Excise as a customs officer in 1912. He later represented the Civil Service cricket team in its only appearance in first-class cricket against the touring New Zealanders at Chiswick in 1927. Batting twice during the match, he scored 2 runs in the Civil Service first-innings before being dismissed by Matt Henderson, while in their second-innings he was dismissed without scoring by the same bowler. He took one wicket in the New Zealanders first-innings, dismissing Stewie Dempster to finish with figures of 1 for 67.

He died at Locksbottom, Kent in July 1944.
