= Reginald Collins =

Australian-born English cricketer and civil servant

Personal information
- Full name: Reginald Stanley Collins
- Born: 12 December 1885; Darlinghurst, New South Wales, Australia
- Died: 1957 (aged 71/72); Kettering, Northamptonshire, England
- Batting: Unknown
- Bowling: Unknown
- Relatives: Herbie Collins (brother)

Career statistics
Competition	First-class
Matches	1
Runs scored	11
Batting average	5.50
100s/50s	0/0
Top score	11
Balls bowled	138
Wickets	2
Bowling average	23.50
5 wickets in innings	0
10 wickets in match	0
Best bowling	2/47
Catches/stumpings	1/–
- Source: Cricinfo, 17 February 2019

Reginald Stanley Collins (12 December 1885 – 1957) was an Australian-born English first-class cricketer and civil servant.

Collins was born in Darlinghurst, an inner suburb of Sydney, the son of Thomas, an accountant, and Emma (née Charlton). His younger brother Herbie would play Test cricket for Australia. He later emigrated to England, gaining employment in the Civil Service. He worked for the Inland Revenue in 1915. He later represented and captained the Civil Service cricket team in its only appearance in first-class cricket against the touring New Zealanders at Chiswick in 1927. Batting twice during the match, he scored 11 runs in the Civil Service first-innings before being dismissed by Cyril Allcott, while in their second-innings he was dismissed without scoring by Matt Henderson. He took 2 wickets in the New Zealanders first-innings, dismissing Charlie Oliver and Bill Bernau, taking figures of 2 for 47.

He later took up duties with the Board of Trade in 1934. Shortly after he moved to the newly formed Unemployment Assistance Board. He died at Kettering in 1957.
