= Allinson Chapman =

English cricketer and civil servant

Personal information
- Full name: Allinson George Chapman
- Born: 7 March 1892; Langton Green, Kent, England
- Died: 21 October 1982 (aged 90); Tunbridge Wells, Kent, England
- Batting: Right-handed
- Bowling: Right-arm fast

Career statistics
| Competition | First-class |
|---|---|
| Matches | 1 |
| Runs scored | 22 |
| Batting average | 11.00 |
| 100s/50s | 0/0 |
| Top score | 22 |
| Balls bowled | 126 |
| Wickets | 3 |
| Bowling average | 24.33 |
| 5 wickets in innings | 0 |
| 10 wickets in match | 0 |
| Best bowling | 3/73 |
| Catches/stumpings | 0/– |
- Source: Cricinfo, 17 February 2019

Allinson George Chapman (7 March 1892 – 21 October 1982) was an English first-class cricketer and civil servant.

Chapman was born at Langton Green in Kent. He joined the Post Office in 1908. Chapman represented the Civil Service cricket team in its only appearance in first-class cricket against the touring New Zealanders at Chiswick in 1927. Batting twice during the match, he scored 22 runs in the Civil Service first-innings before being dismissed by Roger Blunt, while in their second-innings he was dismissed without scoring by Matt Henderson. He took 3 wickets in the New Zealanders only innings, finishing with figures of 3 for 73.

He died at Tunbridge Wells in October 1982.
