= Sharland =

Sharland is an English surname. Notable people with the surname include:

- Alfred Sharland (1890–1944), English cricketer.
- Elizabeth Sharland (1933–2025), Australian actress
- Michael Sharland (1899–1987), Australian journalist
- Wallace Sharland (1902–1967), Australian rules footballer, journalist and commentator
