= Olabode =

- Gender: Male
- Language: Yoruba

Origin
- Origin: Nigeria
- Meaning: Wealth Comes home
- Region of origin: South-west Nigeria

Other names
- Short forms: Ola, Bode

Olabode audiois a Yoruba name from Nigeria, meaning "Wealth Comes Home", derived from ọlá (wealth) and bọ̀de (come home).Notable variants of the name includes "Ola", "Abode", "Bode", etc.

Notable people with the name include:

- Olabode Ibiyinka George (born 1945), Nigerian politician
- Bode Thomas (1918–1953), Nigerian politician
