= Langton Green =

Village in Kent, England

Coordinates: 51.1339°N 0.2068°E

- Location within Kent
- OS grid reference: TQ545395
- District: Tunbridge Wells
- Shire county: Kent
- Region: South East
- Country: England
- Sovereign state: United Kingdom
- Post town: Tunbridge Wells
- Postcode district: TN3
- Dialling code: 01892
- Police: Kent
- Fire: Kent
- Ambulance: South East Coast
- UK Parliament: Tunbridge Wells

Langton Green is a village in the borough of Tunbridge Wells, England, lying around two miles west of the town centre along the A264. It is located within the parish of Speldhurst although it has its own church on the village green—the Grade II*-listed All Saints, built in 1862–63 by George Gilbert Scott. There is also a village primary school, Langton Green CP School, and The Hare public house.

The village is considered to be affluent and is represented locally by Conservative councillors. There is a private school called Holmewood House located in the village and the former Metropolitan Police Commissioner Lord Condon used to live there until 2018.

The table-top football game, Subbuteo, was invented and produced for many years in Langton Green.

Langton Green has a primary school, a local sport association and a popular, modern village hall.

== Notable people ==
- Allinson Chapman (1892–1982), first-class cricketer
- Emma Louisa Turner (1867–1940) pioneering photographer and ornithologist.
