= Remi Fani-Kayode =

Nigerian politician, statesman and lawyer

Remilekun Fani-Kayode
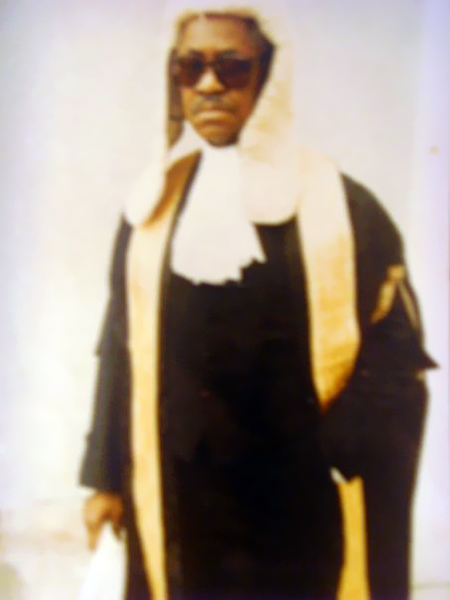

Deputy Premier of Western Nigeria
- In office 1963–1966
- Succeeded by: None

Minister for Local Government Affairs
- In office 1963–1966
- Preceded by: Dauda Adegbenro
- Succeeded by: Unknown

Personal details
- Born: 22 December 1921 Chelsea, England
- Died: October 1995 Brighton, England
- Spouse: Adia Adunni Fani-Kayode
- Children: Remi Aurora Fani-Kayode Rotimi Fani-Kayode; Femi Fani-Kayode; Adetokumbo Fani-kayode; Jean-Luc Bressard-Kayode (nee Fani-Kayode)
- Profession: Lawyer

Chief Victor Babaremilekun Adetokunbo Fani-Kayode//, Q.C., SAN, CON (22 December 1921 – October 1995) was a Nigerian politician, aristocrat, nationalist, statesman and lawyer. He was elected deputy premier of the Western Region of Nigeria in 1963 and played a major role in Nigeria's legal history and politics from the late 1940s until his death in 1995.

== Family background ==
Fani-Kayode hailed from a prominent and well educated Yoruba family of Ife, stock from south-western Nigeria. His grandfather, the Rev. Emmanuel Adedapo Kayode, was an Anglican Priest, who had got his Master of Arts degree from Fourah Bay College, which at that time was part of Durham University. This happened in 1885. His father, Victor Adedapo Kayode, studied law and graduated from Selwyn College, Cambridge in 1921. He was called to the Middle Temple in 1922, and went on to become a prominent lawyer and then judge, in Nigeria. His mother was Mrs. Aurora Kayode, née Fanimokun, who was the daughter of Rev. Joseph Fanimokun, also an Anglican priest. He had also got his Master of Arts degree from Fourah Bay College and later went on to become the principal of CMS Grammar School in Lagos, serving from 1896 to 1914. This was a missionary school that was founded by Bishop Samuel Ajayi Crowther.

In July 1958, he successfully moved the motion for Nigeria's independence in the Federal House of Assembly in Lagos. He argued that independence should take place on 2 April 1960 (the minutes of Hansard, 1958; Richard Sklar's Nigeria's political parties: Power in an Emergent African Nation, World Press, p. 269; p. 269; Professor Onabamiro's Glimpses in Nigeria's History, p. 140). In 1959, there was a further motion that was moved in the Nigerian Parliament, asking for a slight amendment to the Fani-Kayode motion of July 1958. This new motion, which was moved by Sir Abubakar Tafawa Balewa, asked that the 2 April 1960 date for independence, which had already been accepted and approved by Parliament and which had been acquiesced to by the British colonial authorities, should be shifted from 2 April 1960 to 1 October 1960 instead. This motion of amendment was subsequently passed and approved by the Parliament and it was also acquiesced to by the British. That was how the date for Nigeria's independence, 1 October 1960, was finally arrived at.

== Education and professional life ==
After the completion of his study at King's College, Lagos, Fani-Kayode went to Downing College at the University of Cambridge, in 1941. He did the British Bar examinations and came top in his year for the whole of the British Commonwealth. He was called to the British Bar at the Middle Temple in 1945 and was appointed Queen’s Counsel in 1960, becoming the third and youngest Nigerian to receive the title. Later, in 1977, he was made a Senior Advocate of Nigeria (SAN), becoming the third Nigerian to achieve this distinction.

In 1948, he set up the first indigenous Nigerian law firm, "Thomas, Williams and Kayode", with two other lawyers Frederick Rotimi Williams and Bode Thomas, who had been trained at Cambridge and London University, respectively. In 1970, he established another law firm "Fani-Kayode and Sowemimo" with his old friend, Chief Sobo Sowemimo S.A.N.

== Political career ==
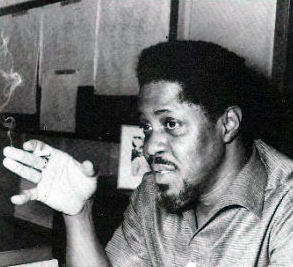
Chief Remilekun Fani-Kayode

Fani-Kayode played a major role in the struggle for Nigeria's Independence. In 1952, together with Rotimi Williams, Bode Thomas and a number of others, he was detained by the British colonial authorities for the active and passionate roles played in the struggle against the British. He was elected the leader of the Action Group youth wing in 1954. He set up a youth wing for the party, who wore "black shirts" and used the "mosquito" as their emblem to reflect their disdain for British colonial rule.

Again, in 1954, Fani-Kayode was elected into the Federal House of Assembly on the platform of Chief Obafemi Awolowo's Action Group, and he continued his fight for Nigeria's Independence from there. He was the Assistant Federal Secretary of the Action Group and in that respect, he played a pivotal role, with the Federal Secretary, Chief Ayo Rosiji, in the organisation and administration of the Action Group. He, alongside Chief Awolowo, S. O. Ighodaro, E. O. Eyo, Adeyemi Lawson and S. G. Ikoku, represented the Action Group at the 1957 London Constitutional Conference.

In 1957, he led the team of Action Group lawyers, who represented and fought for the people of the Northern minorities at the Willinks minorities Commission in their quest for the creation of a middle belt region, which would have been carved out of the old Northern Region of Nigeria. In July 1958, he moved the motion for Nigeria's independence in the Federal House of Assembly (the minutes of Hansard, 1958; p. 269; Professor Onabamiro's Perspectives on Nigeria's History, p. 140).

In 1959, Fani-Kayode resigned from the Action Group and joined the National Council of Nigeria and the Cameroons, an opposition party. In 1960, he was elected the leader of the NCNC in the Western House of Assembly. In 1963, he was elected Deputy Premier of the old Western Region of Nigeria under Chief Samuel Akintola, on the platform of the Nigerian National Democratic Party. He was also appointed Minister of Local Government Affairs for the Western Region the same year.

In the early hours of the morning of 15 January 1966, Major Kaduna Nzeogwu, a Nigerian Army officer, attempted to effect the first military coup d'état in the history of Nigeria. The attempt, though ultimately unsuccessful, resulted in a lot of bloodshed and many senior members of the ruling party, the military and the government of the day, were brutally killed. Early that morning, the coupists, under the command of Captain Emmanuel Nwobosi, stormed and attacked the home of Fani-Kayode, the Deputy Premier of the Western Region. Fani-Kayode was brutalised by the mutineers in front of his family and in the presence of his son, Femi Fani-Kayode, who became Nigeria's Minister of Aviation 40 years later. He was then whisked away by them to an unknown destination. After leaving Fani-Kayode's home, the mutineers, with Fani-Kayode in their custody, went to the Ibadan home of Chief S.L. Akintola, who was Premier of the Western Region. They entered his house as well, and murdered him in front of his family. They also wounded his grandson and daughter-in-law.

Fani-Kayode witnessed the killing of his friend S.L. Akintola by the mutineers, and from there, he was taken to the military cantonment in Lagos, where he was also scheduled to be executed by them. However, luckily for him, on arrival at the Ikeja military cantonment in Lagos, the mutineers were overpowered, overwhelmed and killed by loyalist troops under the command of Lt. Col. Yakubu Gowon (who later became Nigeria's Head of State). Fani-Kayode was freed by the loyalists and kept by them in a safe house until law and order was restored in the country. The coup attempt was effectively quelled by the loyalist forces and all its ringleaders were either killed or captured. Some of the key government officials and senior military figures that were attacked in their homes that night, included Ahmadu Bello (the Premier of the Northern Region), Abubakar Tafawa Balewa (the Prime Minister), Okotie-Eboh (the Minister of Finance), General Maimalari (the Chief of Army Staff), Brigadier Ademulegun (Commander of the Northern Garrison). Fani-Kayode, together with Sir Kashim Ibrahim (the Governor of the Northern Region) were the only ones that were not killed.

Consequently, General Johnson Aguiyi-Ironsi took over power from the remnants of the Tafawa Balewa government on 16 January, the day after successfully foiling Major Nzeogwu's mutiny and violent coup attempt. He then assumed the position of Head of State of the Federal Republic of Nigeria and Supreme Commander of the Nigerian Armed Forces. However, a few months later, he was toppled in a successful northern coup d'état, which was effected on 29 July 1966, and led by Lt. Col. Murtala Mohammed and Lt. Col. Yakubu Gowon (as they then were). During the coup, General Johnson Aguiyi-Ironsi was arrested at Ibadan, together with his host, General Adekunle Fajuyi, by northern soldiers under the command of Major Theophilus Danjuma (as he then was). Both men were then whisked away and taken to a road side bush, where they were both stripped naked and shot. Such was the brutality of the northern "revenge" coup of 29 July 1966, that no less than 300 Igbo army officers and non-commissioned officers were killed. This was due to the fact that, among a number of other grievances, the northern officers were of the view that General Aguiyi-Ironsi had been far too lenient with Major Nzeogwu and his fellow mutineers, after 15 January coup attempt in which many northern (Hausa – Fulani) and western (Yoruba) political leaders and senior military officers had been brutally murdered.

The suspicion by the northern officers that there was collusion and understanding between the Nzeogwu group and General Aguiyi-Ironsi, was further fuelled by the fact that Aguiyi-Ironsi was of Igbo ethnic stock. Forty years after his murder, Aguiyi-Ironsi's son, Thomas Aguiyi-Ironsi, was to become Nigeria's Minister of Defence and took over that position from General Theophilus Danjuma, the man that had killed his father 40 years earlier. Many have said that the seeds of the northern officer's counter-coup of July 1966, which witnessed the killings of General Aguiyi-Ironsi and many other officers and which eventually led to the Nigerian civil war, were planted on that fateful night of 15 January, by the bloodletting of Major Nzeogwu and his men.

After the first ever attempted military coup in Nigeria on 15 January 1966, Fani-Kayode and a number of other notable figures were all detained by the military government of General Johnson Aguiyi-Ironsi. They were later released in July 1966, after the northern counter-coup, led by Lt. Col. Murtala Muhammed and Major Theophilus Danjuma. After Lt. Col. Yakubu Gowon became Nigeria's Head of State, Fani-Kayode left Nigeria with his whole family and moved to the seaside resort town of Brighton in south eastern England. They set up a home and lived there in exile for many years. In 1978, he was one of those that founded and pioneered the National Party of Nigeria. In 1979, he was elected to the position of the National Vice-Chairman of that party and in recognition of his contribution to national development, he was conferred with the honour of Commander of the Order of the Niger by President Shehu Shagari.

Between 1990 and 1994, he was a member of the elders caucus of the National Republican Convention (NRC), one of the two political parties set up by the military government of General Ibrahim Babangida during Nigeria's third republic. After the annulment of Chief Moshood Abiola's presidential election on 12 June 1993, Fani-Kayode was one of those, who openly wrote about and spoke out strongly against the annulment. He even went to court over the issue. In 1994, the government of General Sani Abacha appointed him into the Justice Kayode Eso panel of inquiry, which effectively probed and helped to sanitise the Nigerian judiciary and rid it of corrupt judges.

== Family ==
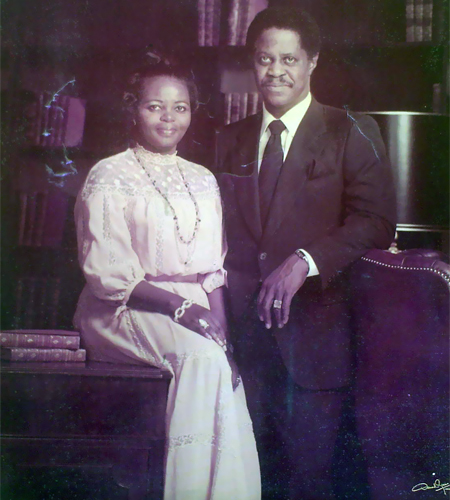
Chief Remilekun Fani-Kayode and his wife Chief (Mrs.) Adia Fani-Kayode in 1975

Fani-Kayode was married to Chief (Mrs.) Adia Adunni Fani-Kayode. They had five children: Akinola Adedapo Fani-Kayode, Rotimi Fani-Kayode, Femi Fani-Kayode, Mrs. Toyin Bajela and Mrs. Tolu Fanning. Fani-Kayode also had four other children (not with Adia Adunni): Aina Ogunbe, Remi Nana Akuffo-Addo, Tokunbo Fani-Kayode and Ladipo Fani-Kayode.
