= Femi Fani-Kayode =

Nigerian politician, essayist, poet and lawyer (born 1960)

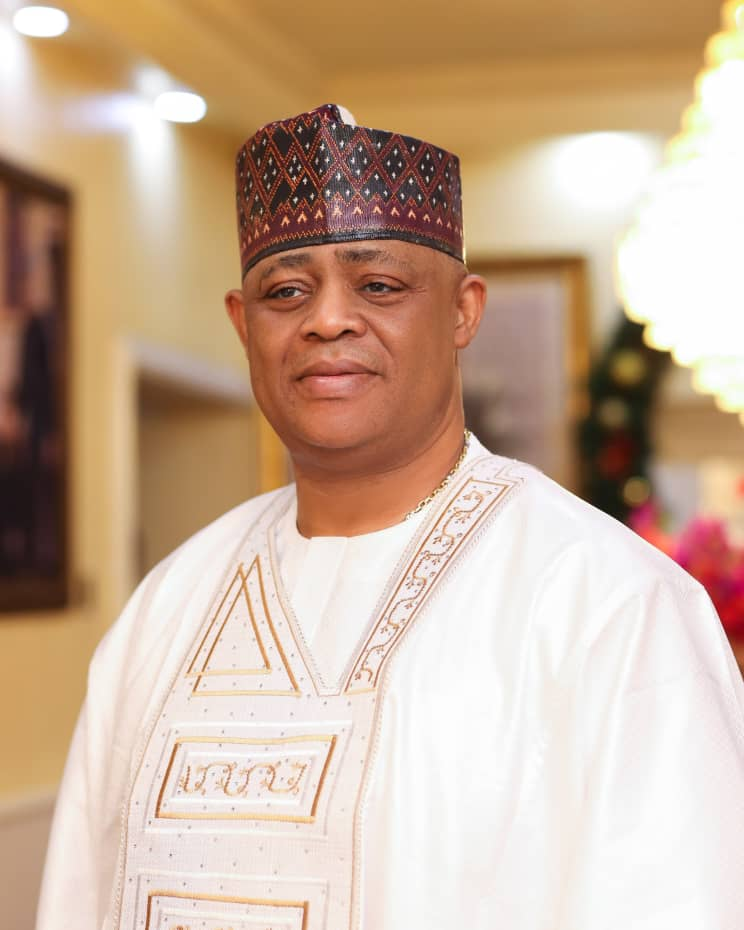

Minister of Culture and Tourism
- In office 22 June 2006 – 7 November 2006
- Preceded by: Frank Ogbuewu
- Succeeded by: Babalola Borishade

Minister of Aviation
- In office 7 November 2006 – 29 May 2007
- Preceded by: Babalola Borishade
- Succeeded by: Felix Hyat

Ambassador Designate of the Federal Republic of Nigeria
- Incumbent
- Assumed office 11 December 2025

Personal details
- Born: David Oluwafemi Adewunmi Abdulateef Fani-Kayode; 16 October 1960 (age 65) Lagos, Lagos State, Nigeria
- Spouse(s): Saratu Atta (1987-1990); Yemisi Adeniji (1991-1995); Precious Chikwendu (2014-2020); Regina Fani-Kayode (1997-to date)
- Children: 9
- Profession: Lawyer, Politician, Writer, Diplomat and Poet.

David Oluwafemi Adewunmi Abdulateef Fani-Kayode (//; born 16 October 1960) is a Nigerian aristocrat, politician, writer, lawyer, diplomat and poet.

He has served as the Special Assistant on Public Affairs, Minister of Culture and Tourism, and the Minister of Aviation, and as an ambassador of the Federal Republic of Nigeria.

Femi Fani-Kayode was honored with the traditional title of Otunba of Joga Orile, Jogaland (meaning "the right hand man to the King") by the Abepa of Orile, Oba (Dr.) Adeyemi Olanrewaju Adekeye of Joga Orile in Ogun State, South Western Nigeria in 2017. He was honored with the traditional title of Sadaukin Shinkafi (meaning "the warrior of the Shinkafi Emirate") by Emir Muhammed Makwashe, the Emir of Shinkafi in Zamfara State, North Western Nigeria in 2020. He was honored with the traditional title of Aare Ajagunla of Otun Ekiti, Mobaland (meaning the "supreme commander of the great warriors of Mobaland") by the Oore of Otun Ekiti, Paramount Ruler of Mobaland, His Royal Majesty, Oba Dr Adekunle Adeagbo in Ekiti State, South Western Nigeria in 2019. He was honored with the traditional title of Wakilin Doka Potiskum (meaning "the leader and commander of the law enforcement officers of the Potiskum Emirate") by His Royal Majesty Emir Umaru Bubaram Ibn Wuriwa Bauya, the Emir of Potiskum in Yobe State, North Eastern Nigeria in 2022.

== Early life and education ==
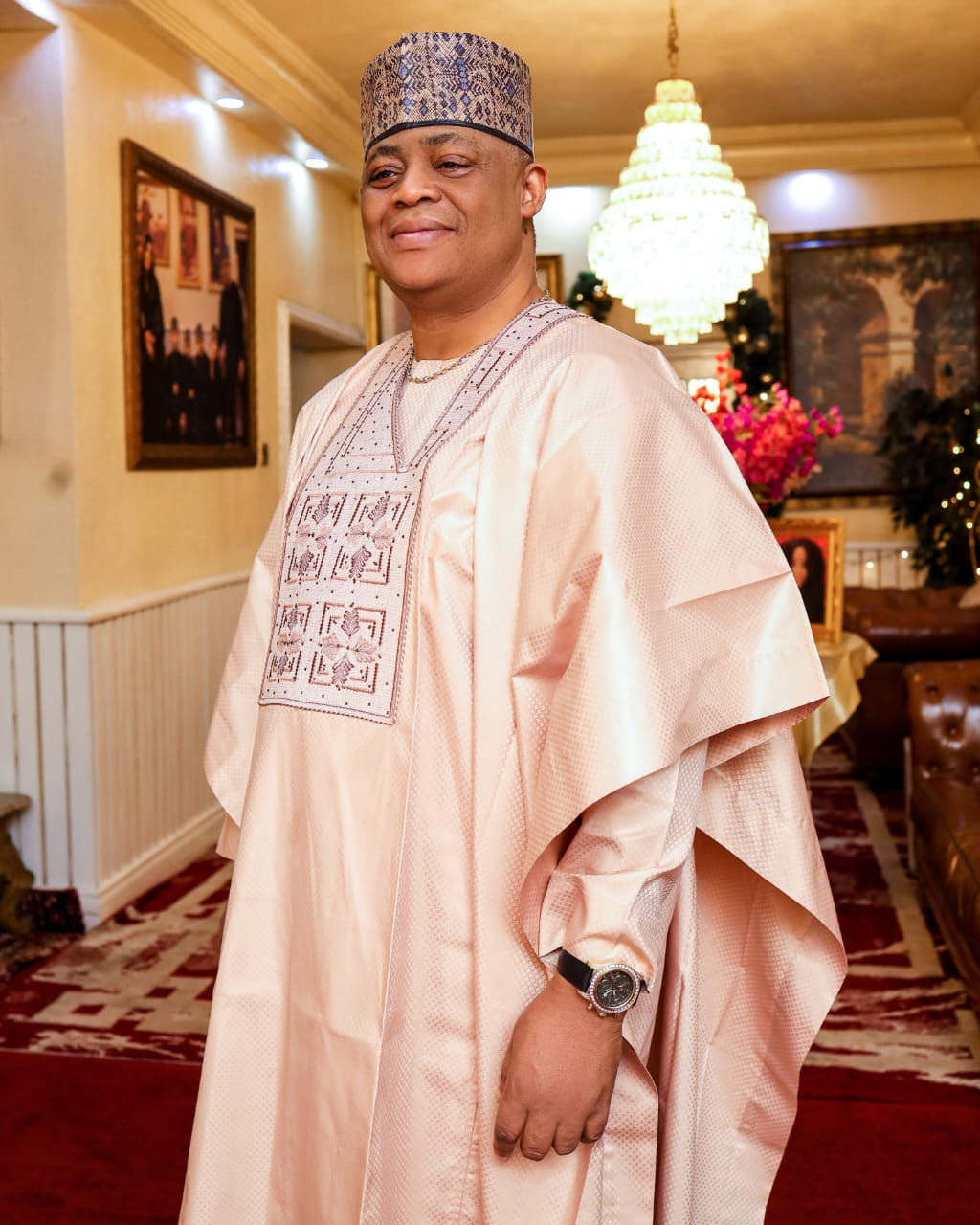
Femi Fani-Kayode, 2025

Femi Fani-Kayode was born on 16 October 1960 in Lagos, to Remi Fani-Kayode and (Mrs.) Adia Adunni Fani-Kayode (née Sa’id). He is from Ile-Ife, Osun State. His great-grandfather, Rev. Emmanuel Adelabi Kayode, was one of the earliest Nigerians to be educated in England, receiving an MA (Hons) in Theology from Durham University in 1893. He also studied Theology at Fourah Bay College, Sierra Leone.

He was one of those that first introduced christianity to Ile-Ife where he became the first Anglican priest and the first person to build and pastor a church. His grandfather, Justice Victor Adedapo Kayode, studied law at University of Cambridge and became a lawyer and the third Nigerian to be appointed as a magistrate and a judge.

His father Remi Fani-Kayode, who was also at University of Cambridge, was a prominent lawyer and political figure in Nigeria in the 1940s 1950s and 1960s. He was appointed youth leader of the Action Group in 1948. And in 1952, he was elected into the Nigerian Parliament on the Action Group platform to represent Ile-Ife.

In 1959, he left the Action Group and was elected leader of the opposition on the platform of National Council of Nigeria and the Cameroons in the Western House of Assembly where he presided from 1960 to 1963. In 1963, on the platform of the NNDP he was elected Deputy Premier of the Western Region and was appointed as Regional Minister of Local Government and Chieftaincy Affairs until 1966. In 1958, he had the distinct honour of successfully moving the motion for Nigeria’s Independence in the Parliament

Femi Fani-Kayode started his education at Brighton College, Brighton in the UK, after which he went to Holmewood House School in Tunbridge Wells, Kent, South-East England. He attended Harrow School in Harrow on the Hill, United Kingdom, and later went to Kelly College in Tavistock, where he completed the rest of his private school education. In 1980, Fani-Kayode went to the University of London, School of Oriental and African Studies where he graduated with an LLB in 1983.

For his LLM, in 1984, he attended Cambridge University (Pembroke College) where his grandfather (Selwyn College), his father (Downing College) and his older brother, Akinola (Downing College) had all previously read law. Justice Victor Adedapo Kayode, Femi Fani-Kayode’s grandfather, had been called to the British bar (at Middle Temple) in 1922 and his father, Remi Fani-Kayode, was called to the British bar (also at Middle Temple) in 1945. After finishing from Cambridge University, Femi Fani-Kayode attended the Nigerian Law School and in 1985 was called to the Nigerian Bar. In 1993, under the tutelage of Archbishop Nicholas Duncan-Williams of Ghana, Femi Fani-Kayode became a Pentecostal Christian and attended The Christian Action Faith Bible Seminary in Accra, Ghana, where he graduated with a diploma in theology in 1995.

== Political career ==
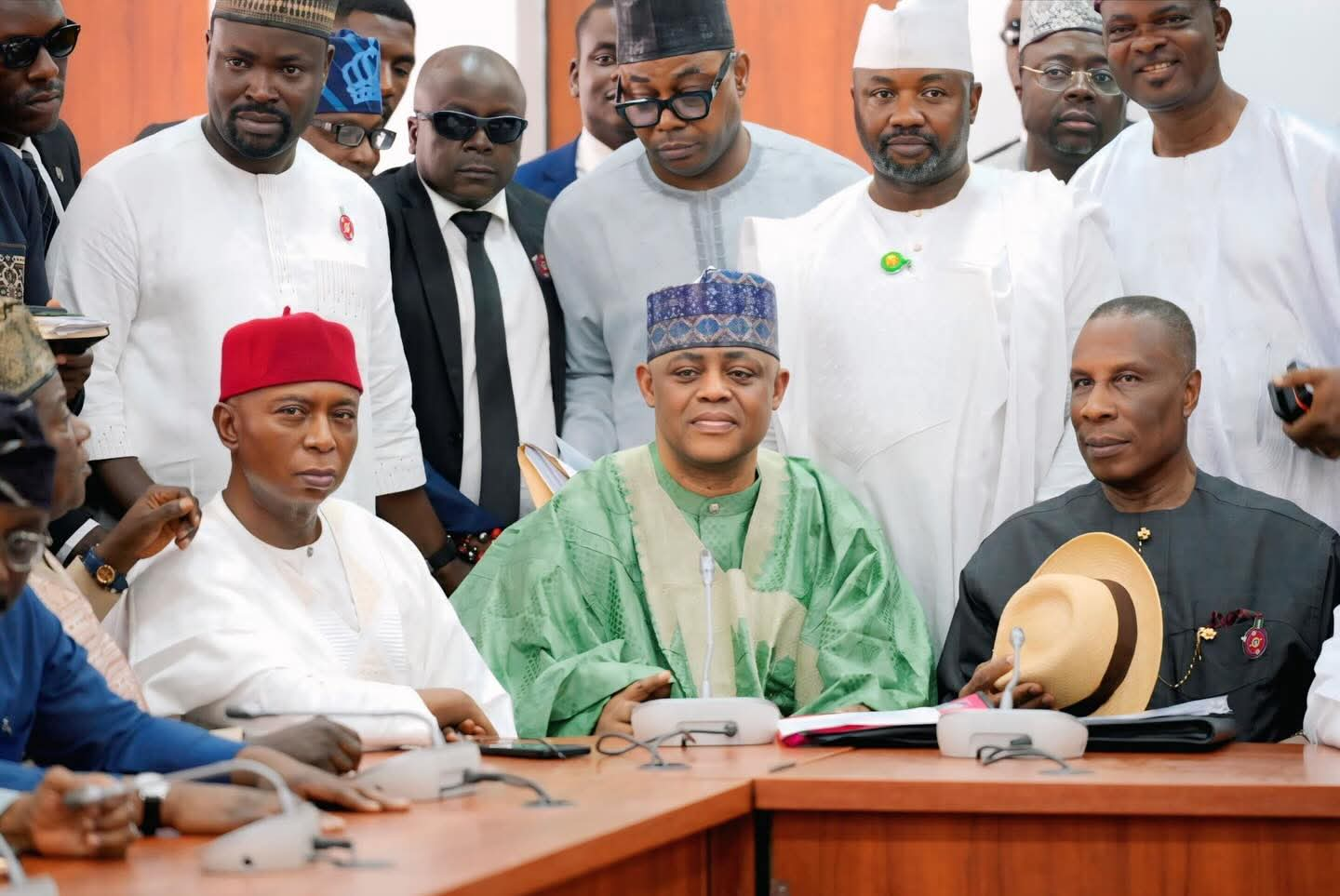
Femi Fani-Kayode, Sen. Ned Nwoko and others during his confirmation by the Nigerian Senate as Ambassador-Designate Federal Republic of Nigeria, 11 December 2025

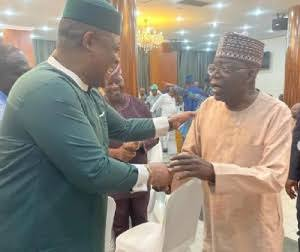
Femi-Fani Kayode and President Bola Tinubu, 2023

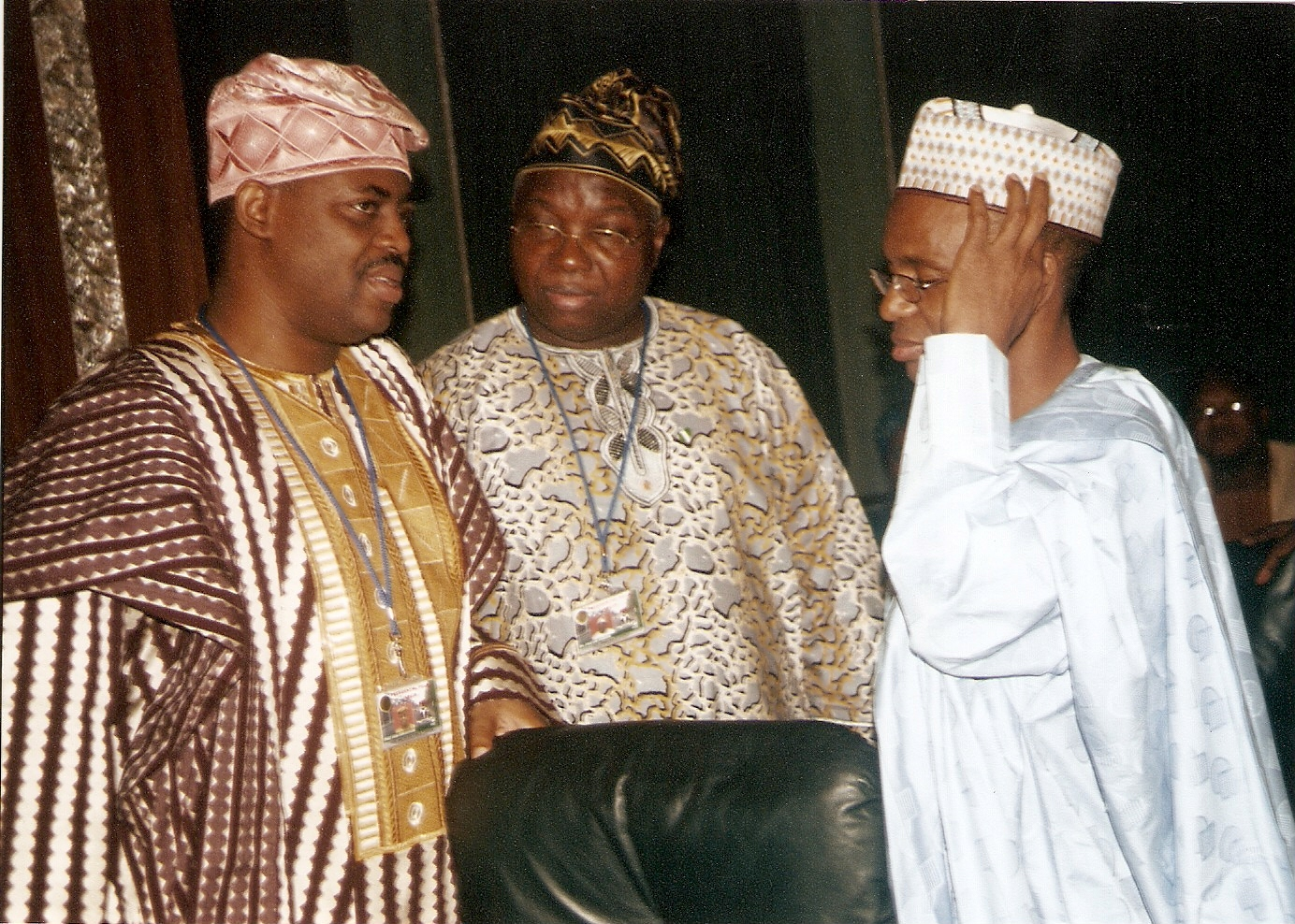
Fani-Kayode, Femi Anibaba (former Minister of Works) and Nasir El-Rufai (former Minister of the Federal Capital Territory) at a cabinet meeting with President Obasanjo, 2007

Femi Fani-Kayode was a member of the Nigerian National Congress (NNC) in 1989. He was elected the national youth leader of NNC that same year. In 1990, he was appointed as Chief Press Secretary to Tom Ikimi, the first national chairman of the National Republican Convention (NRC) and in 1991 as Special Assistant to Alhaji Umaru Shinkafi, former head of the Nigerian Security Organisation (NSO).

In 1996, disturbed by the actions of Gen. Sani Abacha's military junta, Femi Fani-Kayode left Nigeria and joined the National Democratic Coalition (NADECO) abroad where, together with the likes of the Oxford University-trained lawyer Tunde Edu and others, he played a very active role in the pro-democracy campaign against the military regime of Abacha. He came back to Nigeria in 2001 and met President Olusegun Obasanjo.

At the beginning of 2003, Femi Fani-Kayode was appointed by the President as a member of his presidential campaign team for the 2003 presidential election. After President Obasanjo won that election, Femi Fani-Kayode was appointed as the first ever Special Assistant on Public Affairs to the President of the Federal Republic of Nigeria.

In 2006, he was appointed as the Honorable Minister of Culture and Tourism. That same year, after a minor cabinet reshuffle, he was re-deployed to the Aviation Ministry as the Minister of Aviation. Since the end of the tenure of President Olusegun Obasanjo's administration on 29 May 2007, Femi Fani-Kayode has gone back to the private sector and to his legal practice.

In 2025, President Tinubu appointed Femi Fani-Kayode as an ambassador to Germany.

== Challenges and allegations ==
Femi Fani-Kayode was investigated and arrested by the Economic and Financial Crimes Commission (EFCC) in July 2008, in connection with alleged misappropriation of a 19.5 billion naira (approx. $300,000,000) "Aviation Intervention Fund." The investigation found no evidence against him. The Senate Committee on Aviation in early 2008, initially recommended that Fani-Kayode be banned from holding public office for five years but later withdrew it.

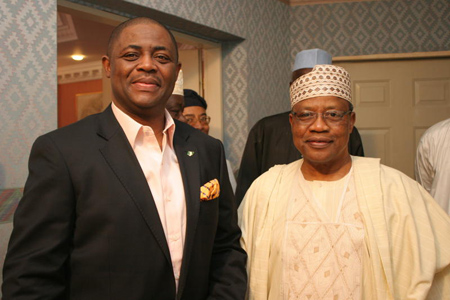
Fani-Kayode with former military President Ibrahim Babangida (rtd) at a private dinner to honour Fani-Kayode's 50th birthday organised by Babangida in Lagos on 17 October 2010

At the beginning of 2010, there was speculation that a power struggle had begun in Nigeria with President Obasanjo and his loyalists pushing for Yar'Adua to step down and hand over power to his vice-president, Dr. Goodluck Jonathan. Yar'Adua's loyalists resisted this suggestion and part of their response to that challenge was to implement another strategy to try to silence and intimidate President Obasanjo and his key loyalists, including El-Rufai, Fani-Kayode, Ribadu, Lawal Batagarawa, Nnenadi Usman and Andy Uba, by accusing them of plotting a coup.

This was the same method that was adopted by General Sani Abacha who had jailed Obasanjo on similar charges when he was in power. General Obasanjo was released and pardoned a number of years later after Abacha died and after General Abdulsalami Abubakar took power.

In November 2010, Femi Fani-Kayode said that Yar'Adua's sought to jail and destroy his predecessor in office and the man that single-handedly brought him to power, President Olusegun Obasanjo, as well as his loyalists, including El-Rufai, Ribadu, and Fani-Kayode himself. He also alleged that Baba Gana Kingibe, the Secretary to the Federal Government during the Yar'Adua administration, was the principal enforcer of that plan and that Yar'Adua administration officials James Ibori, Tanimu Yakubu, Abba Ruma and Michael Aondoakaa were also involved.

On 25 August 2020, while attending a brief press conference during his tour of southern Nigeria, he had an altercation with a journalist from Trust Newspaper who he accused of being rude to him. He verbally assaulted the journalist but apologised for the incident at a later date

== Arrested by EFCC and acquitted by the courts ==
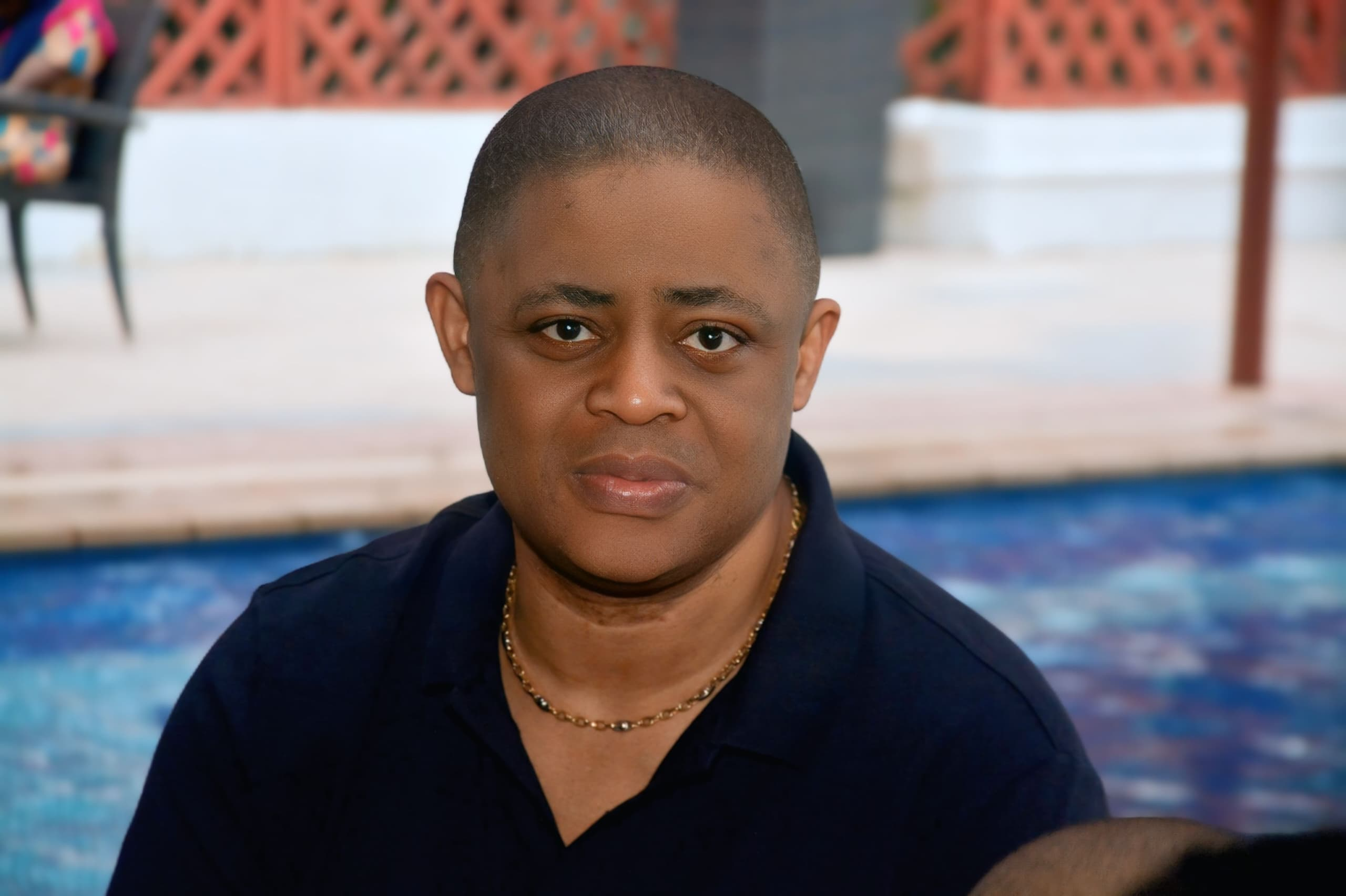
Femi Fani-Kayode, 2025

Femi Fani-Kayode was arrested in December 2008 by the EFCC and charged with 47 counts of money laundering. Fani-Kayode stated that he was innocent and that the monies were funds received from his own private businesses and legitimate sources and had nothing to do with government funds.

He said that the investigations of the Yar'Adua government and the EFCC were politically motivated, and he was being persecuted in the same way as other colleagues from the Obasanjo government, such as Nasir El-Rufai and Nuhu Ribadu, for their ties to President Obasanjo. On 22 October, EFCC operatives of arrested on a 17-count charge of unlawful retention, unlawful use and unlawful payment of money in the tune of about N4.9 billion, a charge brought against them by the anti-graft commission.

Femi Fani-Kayode was discharged and acquitted on 1 July 2015, by a Federal High Court sitting in Lagos on the two-count of money laundering preferred against him by the Economic and Financial Crimes Commission, EFCC. The court held that the EFCC was unable to prove the charges against Fani-Kayode beyond reasonable doubt and consequently acquitted him. The other 15 counts had been thrown out and dismissed by the courts at an earlier date.

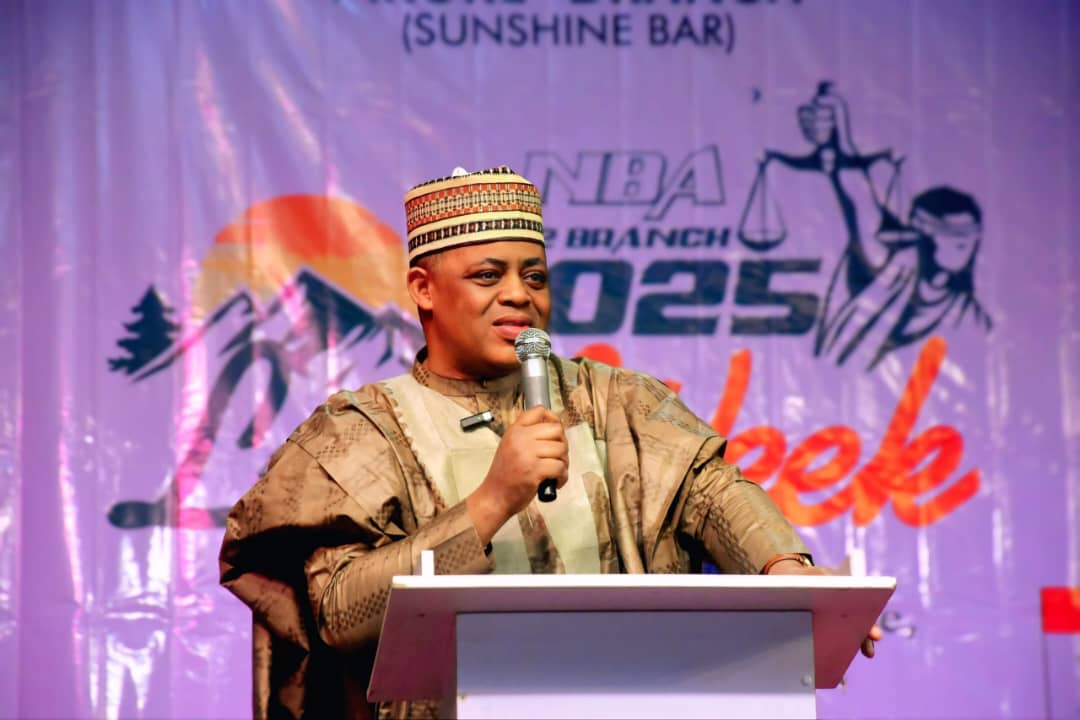
Femi Fani-Kayode, 2025

In his victory press statement, Fani-Kayode changed his name from Oluwafemi Fani-Kayode to Olufemi Olu-Kayode (meaning "the Lord brings joy"). According to him, this was done as a mark of gratitude to God following his acquittal of all the remaining money laundering charges that were brought against him by the EFCC. Fani-Kayode had fought the case since 1 July 2008 and he was finally cleared of all the remaining charges that had not been dismissed earlier on 1 July 2015. This was 7 years to the day after his ordeal first started.

Femi Fani-Kayode had fought the case since 2008 was accused by the EFCC to have laundered about N100m while he was Minister of Culture and Tourism and subsequently Aviation Minister. The allegedly laundered sum was however reduced to N2.1m on 17 November 2014 after Justice Ofili-Ajumogobia, dismissed 38 out of the 40 counts levelled against Fani-Kayode by the EFCC for want of proof.

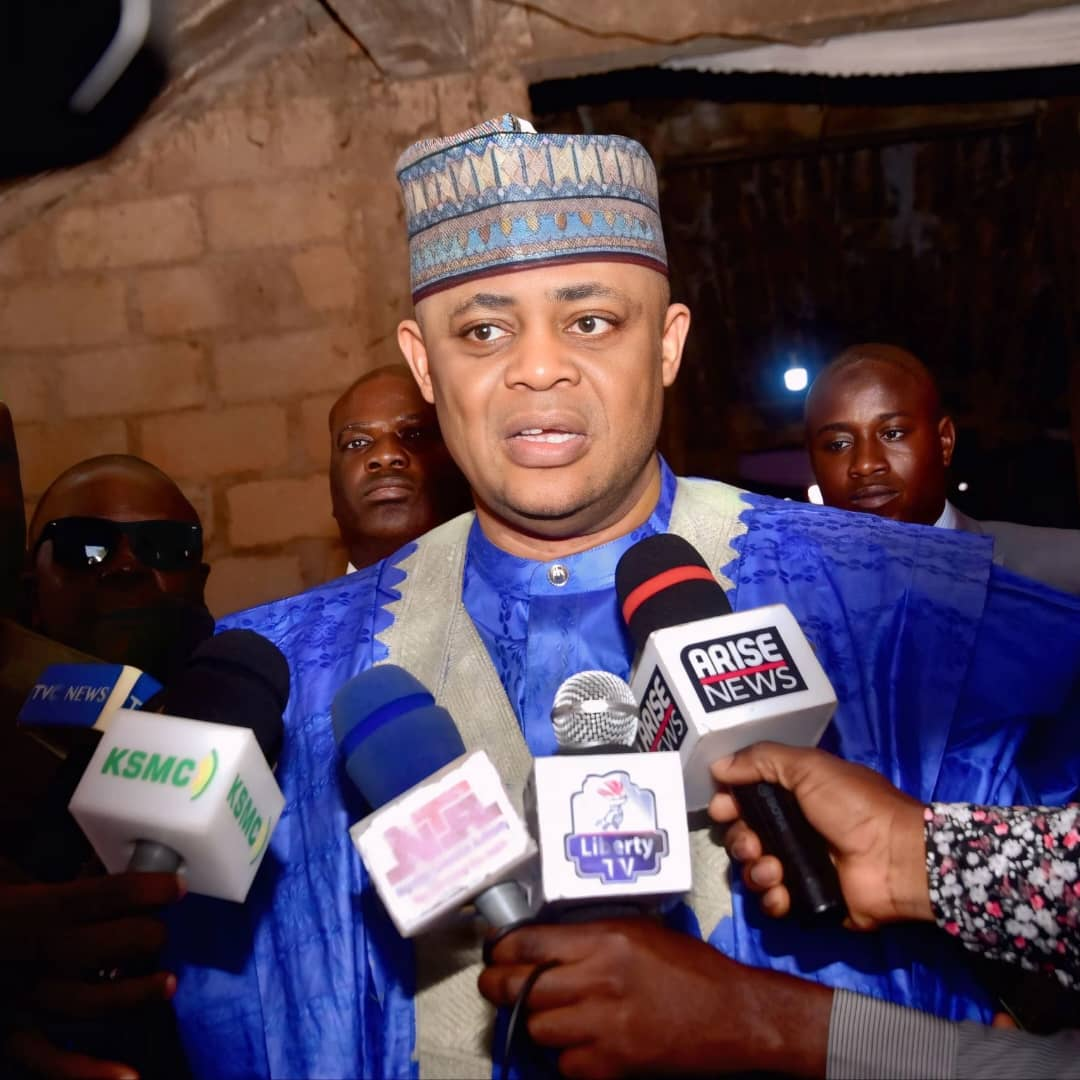
Femi Fani-Kayode, 2025

In 2008 he was accused of misappropriating 19.5 billion naira of the Aviation Intervention Fund and of money laundering whilst he was Minister of Aviation and prosecuted by the EFCC from 1 July 2008 to 1 July 2015 at the Federal High Court in Lagos before Hon. Justice Ahmad, Hon. Justice Binta Nyarku and Hon. Justice Rita Ofili-Ajumogobia respectively. On 1 July 2016, he was discharged and acquitted of all charges by Hon. Justice Rita Ofili-Ajumogobia of the Federal High Court.

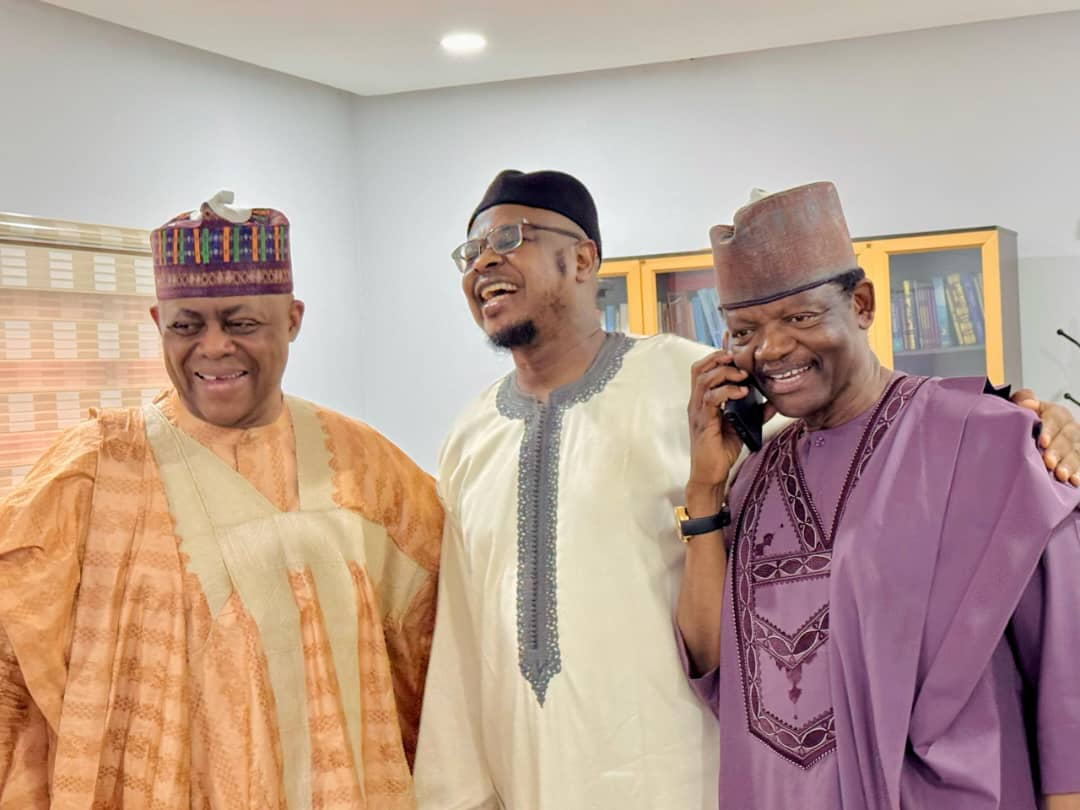
Femi Fani-Kayode with Prof Isa Ali Pantami and Sen. Hassan Muhammad, 2025

In 2016 he was accused of misappropriating 8 billion naira of public funds which he allegedly used for President Goodluck Jonathan's presidential campaign and prosecuted by EFCC from 2016 to 2023 at the Federal High Court in Lagos before Hon. Justice M.S. Hassan, Hon. Justice Aikawa and Hon. Justice Oziagor respectively. 7 years later, all the charges that were brought against him before Justice Osiagor were quashed by the Court of Appeal sitting in Lagos in April 2023.

In 2016 he was accused of illegally receiving 26 million naira from the office of the National Security Advisor to President Goodluck Jonathan, Colonel Sambo Dasuki, and was prosecuted by EFCC from 2016 to 2025 at the Federal High Court Abuja before Hon. Justice Tsoho, Chief Judge of the Federal High Court. On 15 January 2025, he was discharged and acquitted on all counts by Hon. Justice Tsoho.

In 2021 he was accused of forging and procuring fake medical certificates which he allegedly presented before the courts in order to secure an adjournment and was prosecuted by EFCC from 2021 to 2025 at the Lagos State High Court Ikeja before Hon. Justice Olubunmi Abike-Fadipe. On 4 February 2025, he was discharged and acquitted on all counts by Hon. Justice Olubunmi Abike-Fadipe.

== Poems and essays ==
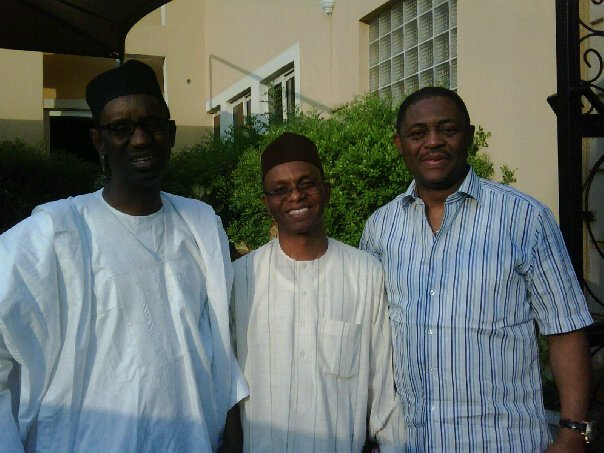
Christmas lunch at the Abuja home of Fani-Kayode with Nuhu Ribadu and Mallam Nasir El-Rufai, December 2010

In November 2009, before Yar'Adua fell ill, Femi Fani-Kayode wrote a poem titled "I Stand and I Fight". In this poem, he described Yar'Adua as a "sickly tyrant with an amalekite foundation" and he predicted that "his end would soon come". Femi Fani-Kayode wrote other poems over the last few years.

In January 2010, approximately two months after Yar'Adua left Nigeria and was flown to Saudi Arabia on medical grounds (during which time no Nigerian other than his wife and his chief security officer saw him or any pictures of him), there were strong speculations in the country that the president was dead, was in a deep coma or was so sick that he could not speak or get up from his sick bed in his Saudi Arabian hospital. This resulted in a power vacuum in Nigeria as a consequence of which a constitutional crisis began to unfold.

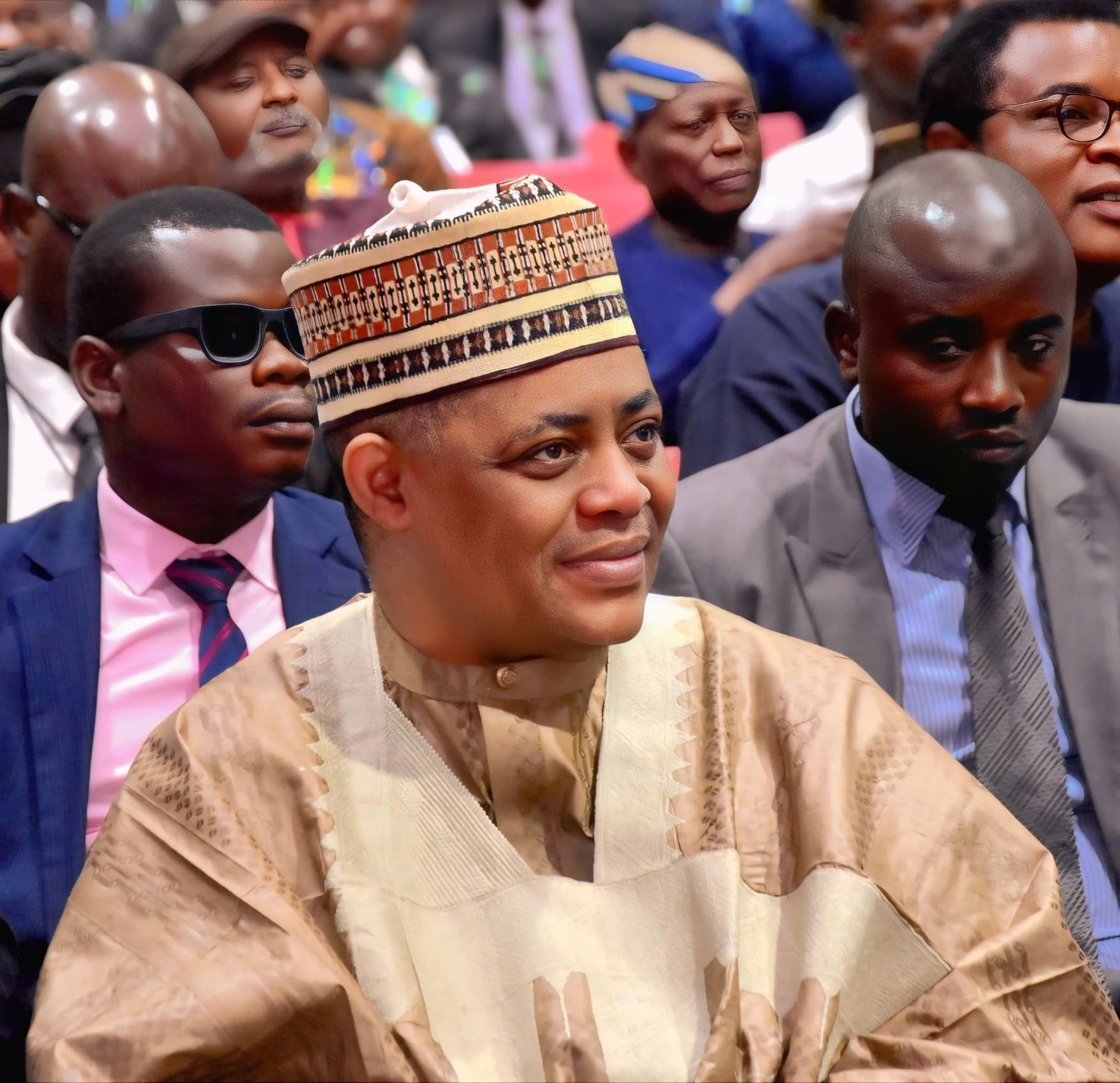
Femi Fani-Kayode, 2025

The President's supporters and cabinet ministers, led by his wife Turai Yar'Adua, resisted the suggestion that the vice-president should take over power while the President was incapacitated even though this was what the Nigerian constitution prescribed, Femi Fani-Kayode added his voice to that of President Obasanjo, President Shehu Shagari, General Yakubu Gowon, Ernest Shonekan and other former heads of government, former cabinet ministers, former legislators, leading opposition figures and leading members of the ruling PDP party by publicly calling for the resignation of President Yar'Adua and for the transference of power to Vice-president Goodluck Jonathan at that critical time.

To convey his view Femi Fani-Kayode wrote a satire in Next Newspaper and titled it "Corpsology: Umaru's Gift To The Modern World".

In the article Femi Fani-Kayode suggested that by insisting on ruling Nigeria from his sick bed in Saudi Arabia and through his acolytes and wife, the President and his supporters were not just breaching the Nigerian constitution but that they were also surreptitiously introducing an entirely new and alien system of government into Nigeria, destroying democracy and attempting to perpetuate themselves in power through that new system indefinitely.

He argued that this was being done by the authorities even where it was clear that the president was already "half dead". Femi Fani-Kayode defined his concept of corpsology (or "corpsocracy" as he sometimes calls it) as "the rulership of the living by the dead" and the thrust and intent of his satire was to clearly convey the message that the attempt to introduce this hitherto unknown system of government into Nigeria by Yar'Adua, his wife and his cabinet was unacceptable and should not be allowed to stand.

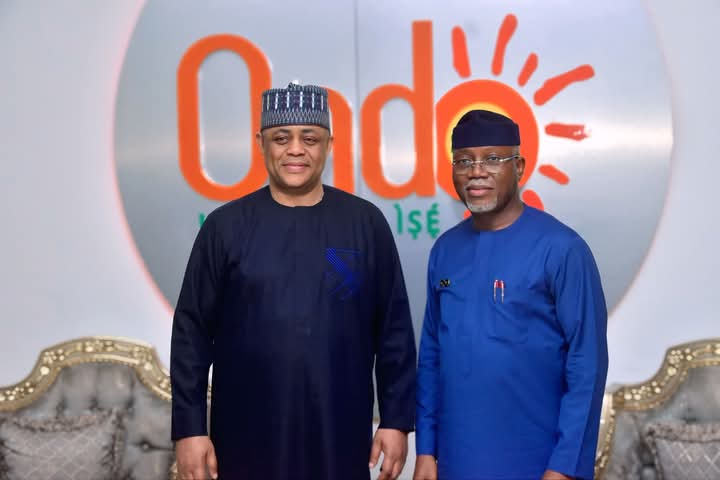
Femi Fani-Kayode with Governor Lucky Aiyedatiwa of Ondo State, 2025

On 7 August 2010 Femi Fani-Kayode wrote another article titled "Charles Taylor: A Man Betrayed" in which he described the events and circumstances leading up to the extradition of the infamous former President of Liberia Charles Taylor from Nigeria, where he had been given refuge and asylum after a bitter war and crisis in his nation Liberia. Femi Fani-Kayode explained how Taylor ended up being handed back to Liberia and how he was then sent to the International Criminal Court at The Hague in the Netherlands to face charges of genocide and crimes against humanity.

Femi Fani-Kayode had been the spokesman of President Obasanjo at that time, and in his essay he gave an account of how Taylor was betrayed by a number of parties and nations and detailed what he described as the "treacherous and ignoble" roles that US President George W. Bush and President Johnson Sirleaf of Liberia played in the saga.

He accused both America and Liberia of reneging on their word and on an earlier agreement on the Taylor issue and he alleged that they "betrayed the confidence" that the African Union, the Economic Community of West African States (ECOWAS) Heads of Government, Nigeria and President Obasanjo had placed in them.

Finally he called for the trial of former President George W. Bush and Britain's former Prime Minister Tony Blair at the same International Criminal Court at The Hague for what he described as "similar crimes against humanity" as the ones that Taylor was being accused of. He alleged that they had committed these crimes during the illegal invasion of Iraq and the bombing of Baghdad in which he claimed that "hundreds of thousands of defenceless and innocent Iraqi women and children" were killed. The article was published the day after the sensational appearance of super-model Naomi Campbell at the famous "blood diamonds" trial of Charles Taylor at The Hague.

Femi Fani-Kayode was also involved in a debate about the mysterious circumstances under which Nigeria's first Prime Minister, Sir Tafawa Balewa, lost his life. In two essays titled "Femi Fani-Kayode: Who Killed Sir Tafawa Balewa?" and "The Death of Tafawa Balewa: the Segun Osoba angle", he opposed the view that Balewa had died of natural causes, which had been suggested by M.T. Mbu, Nigeria's former Foreign Minister and Segun Osoba, a former state governor, and he proffered the view that the Prime Minister had actually been murdered.

Femi Fani-Kayode wrote other essays over the years. In 2011 he called for the "crushing" of the Islamic fundamentalist sect Boko Haram which claimed responsibility for the deaths of hundreds of Nigerians in a campaign of terror and bombing in their quest to ban western education and set up an Islamic fundamentalist caliphate in the whole of northern Nigeria.

== Family ==
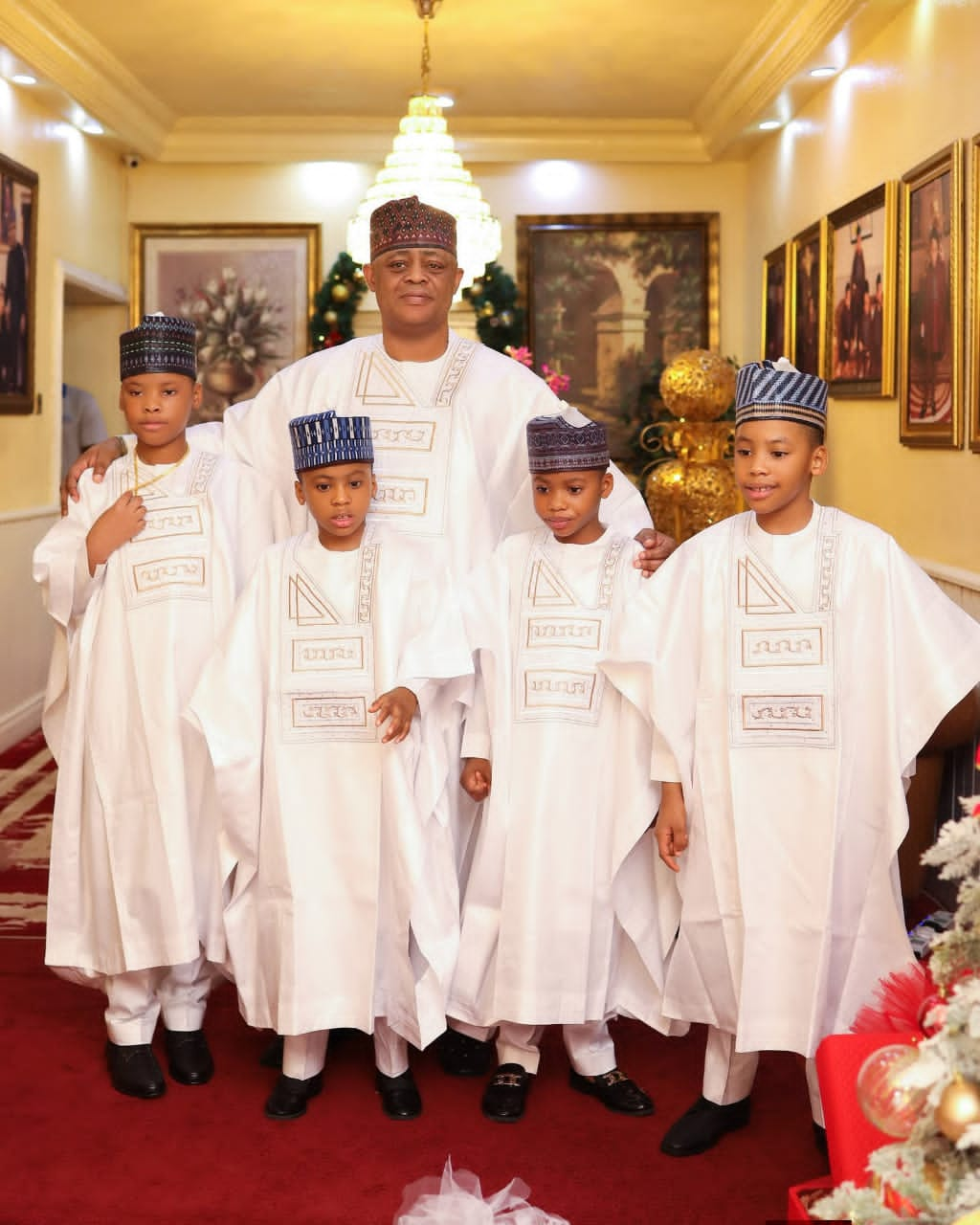
Femi Fani-Kayode with his sons in 2025

Chief Femi Fani-Kayode has been married multiple times and presently has two wives. His first marriage was to Saratu "Baby" Atta in 1987 and they were divorced 1990. They had one child. The second marriage was to Yemisi Olasunbo Adeniji in 1991 but they were divorced by 1995. They have three daughters.

The third marriage was to Regina Fani-Kayode in 1997; they had one daughter.

In 2014 Femi Fani-Kayode and Precious Chikwendu, a beauty queen and the winner of Miss United Nations beauty pageant 2014, got married under native law and custom. This was his fourth marriage. In 2016, Fani-Kayode and Chikwendu had their first son. In May 2018, their triplets were born. In 2020, they were divorced due to irreconcilable differences.

In July 2025 Chief Femi Fani-Kayode married Adaugo Fani-Kayode, an interior designer and devout Pentecostal Christian from Abia state, Nigeria.

Chief Femi Fani-Kayode has 9 children. They are Folake Fani-Kayode, Temi Fani-Kayode, Tobi Fani-Kayode, Tumi Fani-Kayode, Remi Fani-Kayode, Aragorn Fani-Kayode, Ragnar Fani-Kayode, Aiden Fani-Kayode and Liam Fani-Kayode.
