= Edwin Bennett (cricketer) =

English cricketer

Personal information
- Full name: Edwin Howard Bennett
- Born: 21 December 1893; Shifnal, Shropshire, England
- Died: 9 July 1929 (aged 35); East Worthing, Sussex, England

Domestic team information
- Years: Team
- 1921–1924: Staffordshire
- 1925: Worcestershire

Career statistics
| Competition | First-class |
|---|---|
| Matches | 4 |
| Runs scored | 157 |
| Batting average | 19.62 |
| 100s/50s | 0/2 |
| Top score | 73 |
| Catches/stumpings | 1/– |
- Source: CricketArchive, 4 March 2009

Edwin Howard Bennett (21 December 1893 – 9 July 1929) was an English cricketer, who played four first-class matches. He was born in Shifnal, Shropshire, and he died at the age of 35 in East Worthing, Sussex.

Three of Bennett's games were for Worcestershire in 1925, while the other came for the Civil Service (playing their only first-class match) in 1927. In the latter game against the touring New Zealanders, themselves making their first tour of England, he made 73 and 60 (by some distance the highest scores of his career). He brought off only one catch in first-class cricket, to dismiss Bob Wyatt in the derby against Warwickshire.

Before his brief first-class career, Bennett played a number of games in the Minor Counties Championship for Staffordshire; he scored 97 for them against Kent Second XI in 1921. He also played club cricket for Wolverhampton, and in a single-innings game against Shrewsbury School in 1922 hit 146 opening the batting; the match was eventually drawn with Shrewsbury nine wickets down.
