= Robert Bairamian =

English cricketer and schoolmaster

Personal information
- Full name: Robert Bairamian
- Born: 18 March 1935; Nicosia, British Cyprus
- Died: 7 September 2018 (aged 83); Hove, Sussex, England
- Batting: Right-handed
- Bowling: Right-arm off break

Domestic team information
- Years: Team
- 1957: Cambridge University

Career statistics
Competition	First-class
Matches	2
Runs scored	45
Batting average	22.50
100s/50s	–/–
Top score	24
Balls bowled	7
Wickets	1
Bowling average	6.00
5 wickets in innings	–
10 wickets in match	–
Best bowling	1/6
Catches/stumpings	1/–
- Source: Cricinfo, 9 September 2020

Robert Bairamian (18 March 1935 – 7 September 2018) was an English first-class cricketer and educator.

Bairamian was born at Nicosia in British Cyprus to Sir Vahe Bairamian, a Chief Justice of Sierra Leone, and his wife Eileen Elsie Connelly, a headmistress of The English School, Nicosia. After spending ten years living in Cyprus, he was sent to England where he attended Dover College, before going up to St Catharine's College, Cambridge, where he read classics. While studying at Cambridge, he made two appearances in first-class cricket for Cambridge University against Middlesex and the Free Foresters in 1957, scoring 45 runs and taking a single wicket with his off break bowling. In addition to playing cricket while at Cambridge, he also played hockey, for which he gained a blue.

After graduating from Cambridge, he became the assistant headmaster at Holmewood House School in Kent in 1957 and two years later he became its headmaster. At Holmewood he encouraged admissions from West Africa, who among those he taught in the 1950s was Nana Akufo-Addo, the future President of Ghana. He moved on to Aberdour School in Surrey in 1975, where he taught Jeremy Vine, and shortly thereafter to North Bridge House School by Regent's Park, where he was a classics master. From there he taught at Claremont School in St Leonards-on-Sea, before ending his teaching career in 2001 at St Christopher's School, Hove. Bairamian was married four times and had two sons, both of whom survived him. He died at Hove in September 2018.
