= Holmewood House School =

Coordinates: 51°7′33″N 0°12′58″E

Location
- Barrow Lane; Langton Green, Kent, TN3 0EB; England

Information
- Type: Preparatory school
- Motto: Constantia Praesta; Excel by Perseverance
- Religious affiliation: Inter-Denominational
- Established: 1945
- Chairman of Governors: Jeremy Thompson
- Head: Ruth O'Sullivan
- Gender: Mixed
- Age: 3 to 13
- Enrolment: c.460
- Houses: Oak, Cedar, Beech, Cob, Yew, Ash
- Colours: Dark blue and light blue
- Publication: The Holmewoodian
- Former pupils: Old Holmewoodians
- Website: https://www.holmewoodhouse.co.uk/

Holmewood House School is an IAPS independent, co-educational preparatory school for boys and girls aged 3–13, in Langton Green, near Tunbridge Wells, Kent. The building is a Decimus Burton mansion, originally called Mitchells, rebuilt in 1837 after a fire.

== Notable former pupils ==
- Sir Terence Etherton (Master of the Rolls)
- Tristan Gemmill (actor)
- Dan Stevens (actor)
- Hugh Skinner (actor)
- Shane MacGowan (musician, singer with The Pogues)
- Justin Chancellor (musician Tool (band))
- Femi Fani-Kayode (Nigerian lawyer and politician)
- Andy Zaltzman (comedian)
- Herbert Addo (Ghanaian Premier League football coach)
- Haydn Keenan (Australian film director)
- Nana Akufo-Addo (President of Ghana)
- Jake Obetsebi Lamptey (Chairman, New Patriotic Party, Ghana)

== Notable former staff ==
- Robert Bairamian (cricketer), was headmaster between 1959 and 1975.
- Sir Patrick Moore CBE (astronomer and television presenter)
- Bob Woolmer (cricketer)
