= Precious Chikwendu =

Nigerian actress and model (born 1989)

- Born: Precious Chikwendu; 25 May 1989 (age 37); Makurdi, Benue State
- Education: University of Calabar
- Occupations: Model, beauty queen, actress
- Height: 5 ft 10 in (178 cm)
- Children: 4
- Beauty pageant titleholder
- Hair color: Brown
- Eye color: Brown
- Website: snowhitefoundation.com

Precious Chikwendu (born 25 May 1989) is a Nigerian beauty pageant titleholder from Etti-Nanka, Anambra State. She is a model and a Nollywood actress.

== Early life and education ==
Precious is the second child of a family of seven children. She had her primary education at Makurdi International School, Benue State. She attended ECWA Secondary School, North Bank Makurdi, Benue State for her secondary school.

She graduated from the University of Calabar, Cross River State, where she obtained a Bachelor of Science (BSc) degree in Environmental Science (Forestry and Wildlife Conservation).

== Career ==
Precious started modelling in 2006, participating in ‘M IDOLS FASHION SHOW’ in Calabar. In the same year, she took part in numerous fashion and runway shows including NIGERIA TELEVISION FASHION SHOW, CATWALK FOR CHANGE and GALAXY TELEVISION FASHION WEEK.

In 2007, Precious emerged first runner-up in the Prettiest Girl Nigeria contest and also participated in the Miss Earth Nigeria Pageant, where she finished in the Top 10.

In 2010, she was a contestant in Miss Nigeria 2010, which was held in Abuja.

Precious has, most recently, been the face of brands and events like Face of Safari and Face of Genism. She has starred in numerous TV commercials, most notably Medik55 and Passions Energy Drink, both of Orange Drugs Pharmaceuticals.

She dabbled into acting in 2007. She featured in movies like, I come Lagos (by Elvis chucks), secrets and scandal (TV series by Elvis Chucks), Ndi Nche ulo (by Victor Okpala) (housekeepers), thy will be done (by Obi Emelonye), love struck (by Obi Emelonye), Onye Ozi (by Obi Emelonye), the calabash (TV series by Obi Emelonye). In addition to her acting career, before winning the world title, she worked at star advantage company Calabar as a commercial manager

== Personal life ==
Precious Chikwendu is single. She was married to Femi Fani-Kayode under native law and custom but they divorced and went their separate ways in 2020 due to irreconcilable differences. She is the mother of his 4 sons, including a set of triplets.

Awards and achievements
Preceded by Alexi Rabolion	Miss United Nations; 2014	Succeeded by Sherrie Gearheart
