= Tom Pearce (cricketer) =

English cricketer and rugby union official

Personal information
- Full name: Thomas Neill Pearce
- Born: 3 November 1905; Stoke Newington, London, England
- Died: 11 April 1994 (aged 88); East Worthing, Sussex, England
- Batting: Right-handed
- Bowling: Right arm medium

Domestic team information
- Years: Team
- 1929 – 1950: Essex

Career statistics
Competition	First-class
Matches	250
Runs scored	12061
Batting average	34.26
100s/50s	22/59
Top score	211*
Balls bowled	1413
Wickets	15
Bowling average	61.80
5 wickets in innings	0
10 wickets in match	0
Best bowling	4/12
Catches/stumpings	153/–
- Source: CricketArchive, 14 March 2018

Thomas Neill Pearce OBE (3 November 1905 – 11 April 1994) was an English cricketer and Rugby Union official. He was primarily a batsman for Essex and was captain for nearly 20 years. He also acted as secretary, chairman and president of Essex, and was also a Test selector for England.

== Cricket career ==
Pearce made his first-class debut against Sussex at Leyton in 1929. He opened the batting, however number 6 was to become his usual position in the batting order. His selection was based on his high scoring in club cricket, at a time when Essex relied greatly on amateurs. During his first few years as an Essex player, he worked as a banker, however after two seasons he gave it up and started work in the wine trade.

His first season as captain in 1933; a role he shared until 1938 with Denys Wilcox, saw Essex rise from 13th to 4th in the County Championship. The Wisden Cricketers' Almanack of 1934 reported that "Pearce captained with tactical judgment and enjoyed no little success as a batsman". A change of job ensured that Pearce could remain Essex's full-time captain until 1950, when he retired.

His most prolific season was in 1948, when he scored 1,487 runs at an average of 49.56. He also hit his highest score of his career in the same season, an unbeaten 211 against Leicestershire.

Immediately after retiring, Pearce became a Test selector for England. He was also manager of the MCC's tour of India, Ceylon (now Sri Lanka) and Pakistan, during the winter of 1961–2. He also selected his own T. N. Pearce's XI, which played against the touring Test side annually between 1951 and 1978.

== Rugby Union career ==
Pearce was also described as a "top-class" referee, and took charge of 10 international matches.
