= Frederick Rotimi Williams =

Nigerian lawyer (1920–2005)

Chief Rotimi Williams QC, SAN

Regional Minister for Local Government
- In office 1954–1958
- Preceded by: Obafemi Awolowo

Regional Minister for Justice
- In office 1958–1960
- Prime Minister: Tafawa Balewa

Personal details
- Born: 16 December 1920 Lagos, Nigeria
- Died: 26 March 2005 (aged 84)
- Party: Action Group

Chief Frederick Rotimi Alade Williams, QC, SAN (16 December 1920 – 26 March 2005) was a prominent Nigerian lawyer who was the first Nigerian to become a Senior Advocate of Nigeria. In the 1950s, he was a member of the Action Group and subsequently became the minister for local government and justice. He was the president of the Nigerian Bar Association in 1959. He left politics in the 1960s, as a result of the political crisis in the Western Region of Nigeria.

During his career, he was involved in memorable court cases, such as Lakanmi vs the Western Government of Nigeria, which set the precedent that a military government could not use its power to make laws that will appropriate an individual's property. The Oloye Williams, himself a Yoruba chieftain, was also among a group of lawyers that represented the Oba of Lagos, Adeniji Adele, against challenges by the Nigerian National Democratic Party. The latter had previously gained solidarity and foundation from the ruling House of Docemo in Lagos.

== Early life ==
Rotimi Williams was born on 16 December 1920 in Lagos. His older brother was Akintola Williams, born a year earlier, who became a distinguished Chartered Accountant. His father and uncle were both lawyers, and were called to the bar in 1927 and 1892 respectively. He entered primary school in the 1930s, at the Methodist Ologbowo School, then went to C.M.S. Grammar School, Lagos for his secondary education. Despite having been awarded a full scholarship to study mechanical engineering at Yaba Higher College, he chose to become a lawyer. He earned his bachelor's degree in 1942 and was called to the bar at the Gray's Inn, London, in 1943. He set up the first indigenous Nigerian law firm in 1948 with Chief Remilekun Fani-Kayode and Chief Bode Thomas. The law firm was called "Thomas, Williams and Kayode".

== Early political career ==
In 1943, he became the first Nigerian solicitor to the Supreme Court of Nigeria and soon thereafter entered the political arena as a member of the Nigerian Youth Movement. He rose to become the movement's general secretary. However, the movement was soon embroiled in a crisis which dented its political support among the Nigerian masses. When the movement began to fade politically, he was one of the educated members of the Nigerian political class who joined the Action Group. He was the group's legal adviser in the early 1950s. He had previously entered the Western region's House of Chiefs by virtue of his holding of the chieftaincy title of the Apesin of Itoko in Egbaland. He later also served as a member of that region's privy council. He was elected into the Lagos Town Council in 1953 and was subsequently made chairman of the council. In 1957, he became the Western Region's Attorney General, the first Nigerian to be an attorney general. He was made Queen's Counsel in 1958, another first for him, as he was one of the first two Nigerians to be made one.

== Constitutional conference ==
On 18 October 1975, Rotimi Williams became the chairman of the Constitutional Drafting Committee. The body was formed to present a draft constitution to be approved by the military administration of Obasanjo. He led the convention to present an agenda for broad coalition building across ethnic and regional lines. The body pushed for presidential winners to have at least 25% of the total votes cast in two thirds of the nineteen states in Nigeria and that each of the 19 states of the federation should have a minister representing them. And that political parties should also have support in at least two thirds of the states, amongst others.
