= East Worthing =

Residential area in West Sussex, England

Coordinates: 50.817092°N 0.35102194°W

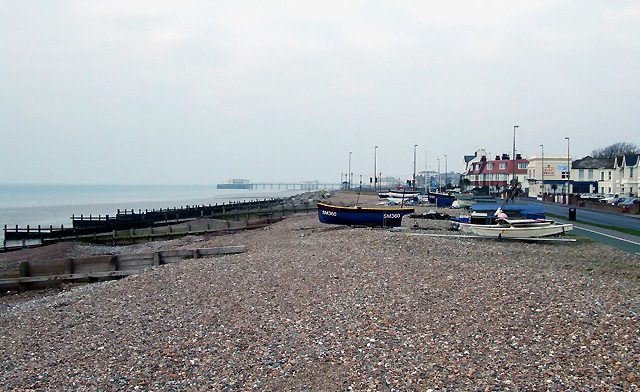
- Fishing boats on the beach at East Worthing, New Year's Day 2009

- Location within West Sussex
- District: Worthing
- Shire county: West Sussex
- Region: South East
- Country: England
- Sovereign state: United Kingdom
- Post town: Worthing
- Postcode district: BN
- Police: Sussex
- Fire: West Sussex
- Ambulance: South East Coast
- UK Parliament: East Worthing and Shoreham

East Worthing is a residential area of Worthing in the Worthing district, in the county of West Sussex, England, situated immediately to the east of Worthing town centre. It is bounded by the West Coastway railway line and Broadwater to the north, Brooklands Park to the east, Homefield Park and Worthing town centre to the west and the English Channel coast to the south.

== History ==
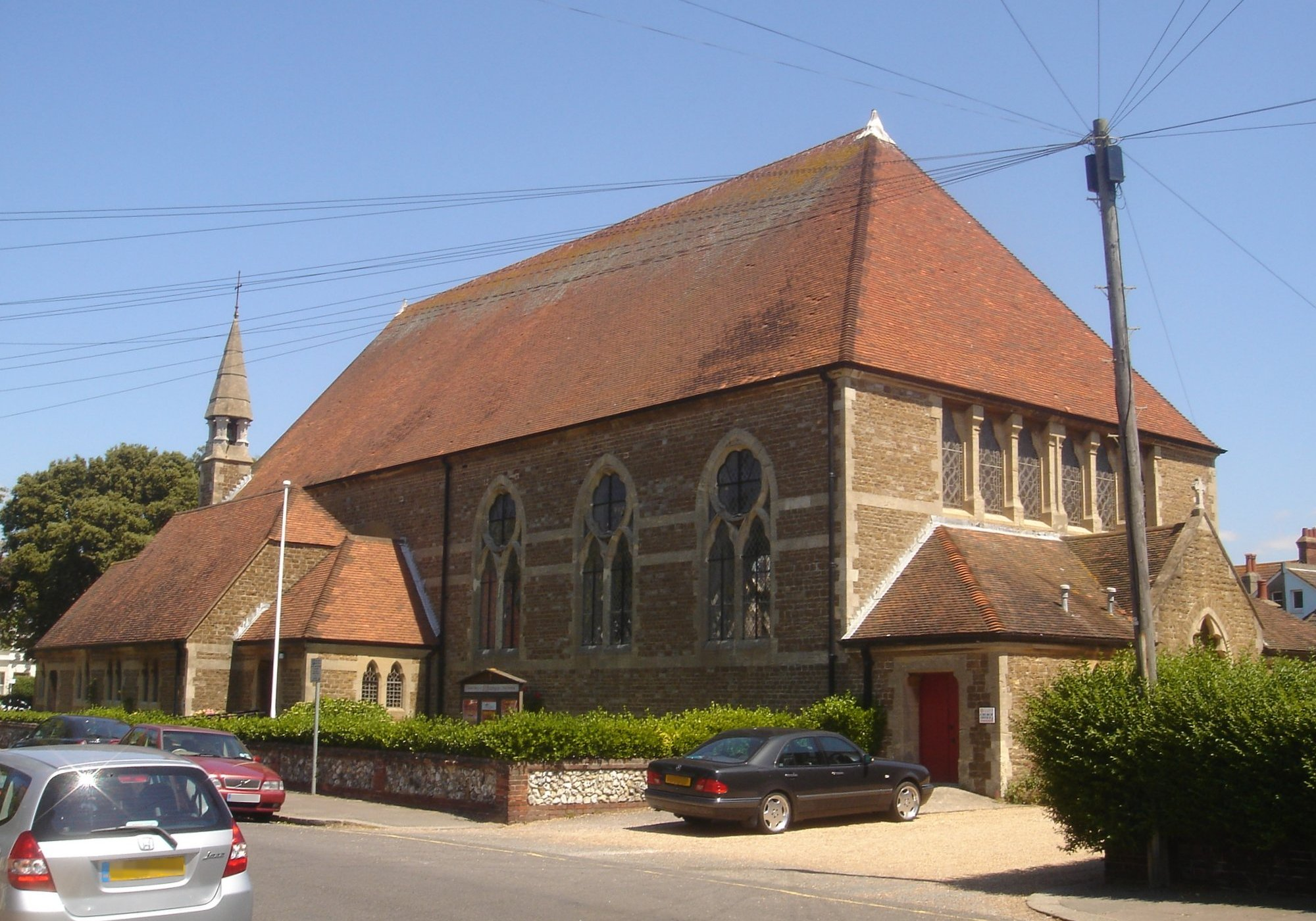
St George's Church was completed in 1868.

Like the early hamlet of Worthing, the area of modern East Worthing was initially part of the parish of Broadwater. In the 19th century the first few houses in existence were economically dependent on the 18th-century brickworks and two smock mills in the vicinity, both of which existed by 1831.

Development spread east of Worthing town centre around 1850. Gradually, the town expanded to the east, and in the 1860s a church was proposed to serve the area, which had become known as East Worthing. Large detached villas were built along Farncombe Road and Selden Road and St George's Church was built in 1868 in anticipation of further development to the east. To the east of Ham Road large areas were used for the area's glasshouse industry for growing fruit and flowers.

Significant erosion of the coastline took place over the course of the 19th century, with at least 70 yards of land lost. The earlier coast road to Lancing was 60 yd (55 m)-100 yards to the south of the present day coast road on Brighton Road. Rebuilt further inland in 1874, the original Half Brick Inn was washed away in 1869.

In the Edwardian period development continued east of St George's Church along Brighton Road, St George's Road and Alexandra Road. By the inter-war period development had reached the banks of the Teville Stream with the building of Seamill Park Crescent.

== Governance ==
East Worthing lies within the borough of Worthing and mostly lies within Selden ward, which has three councillors that represent the area on Worthing Borough Council. For elections to West Sussex County Council most of the area is represented by the Worthing East electoral division. The area is represented at Westminster by the East Worthing and Shoreham constituency.

== Architecture ==
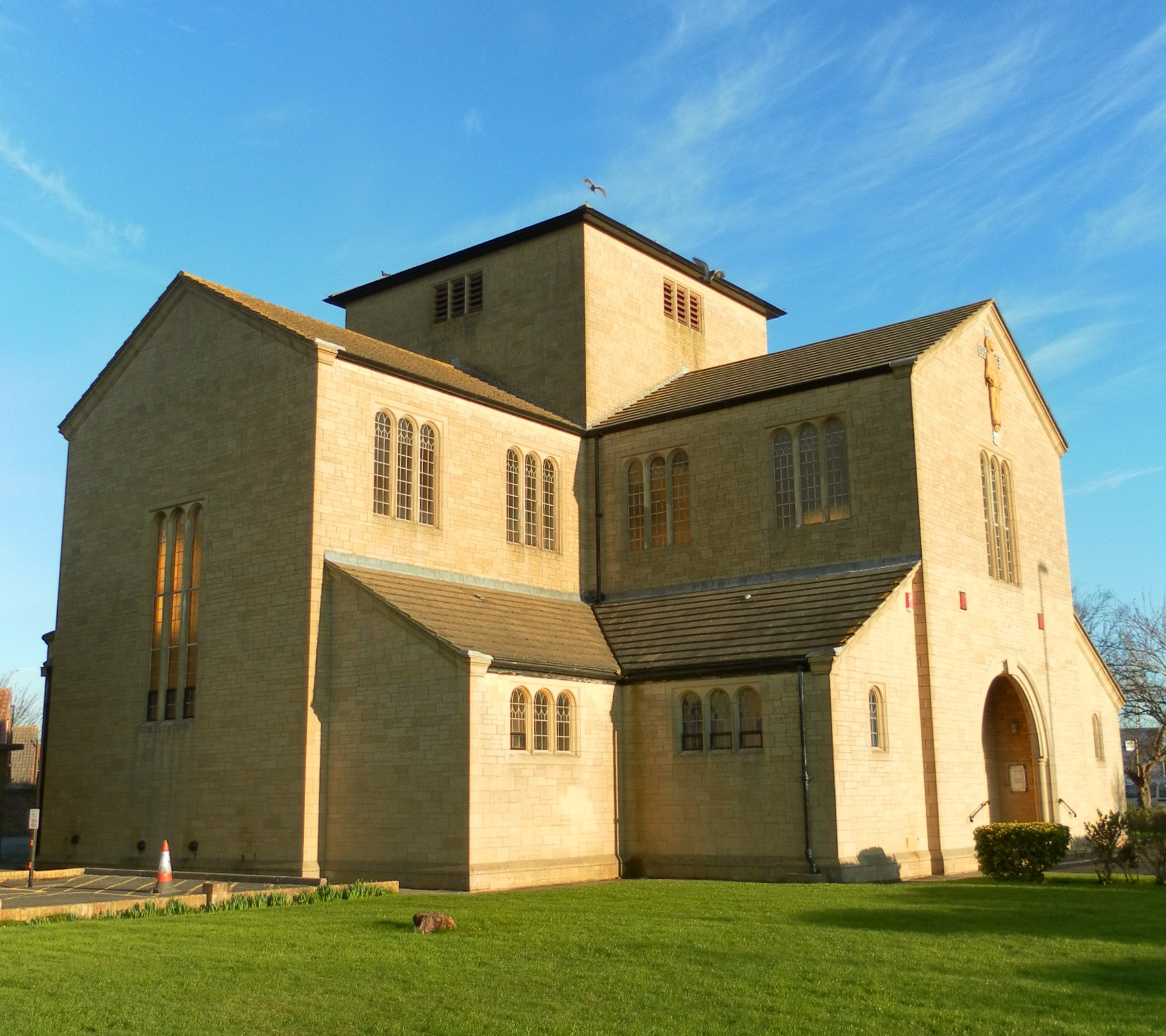
The Roman Catholic Church of St Charles Borromeo by Henry Bingham Towner

Buildings of note include those along Farncombe Road, St George's Church (1868) by George Truefitt and the Church of St Charles Borromeo (1962) by Henry Bingham Towner.

== Transport ==
East Worthing railway station has westbound services to Portsmouth Harbour and Southampton Central and eastbound services to Brighton. It opened in 1905 as Ham Bridge Halt.

Buses are provided by Stagecoach South including the Coastliner 700 service to Worthing town centre, Shoreham-by-Sea and Brighton.

== Notable residents ==
- Edwin Bennett, cricketer
- William A. Dunkerley, author
- W.E. Henley, poet
- Elsie Oxenham, author
- Tom Pearce, cricketer

== Bibliography ==
- Elleray, D. Robert (1998). A Millennium Encyclopaedia of Worthing History. Worthing: Optimus Books. ISBN 0-9533132-0-4.
- Williamson, Elizabeth; Hudson, Tim; Musson, Jeremy; Nairn, Ian; Pevsner, Nikolaus (2019). Sussex: West. Yale University Press. ISBN 9780300225211.
