= St George's Church, Worthing =

St George's Church
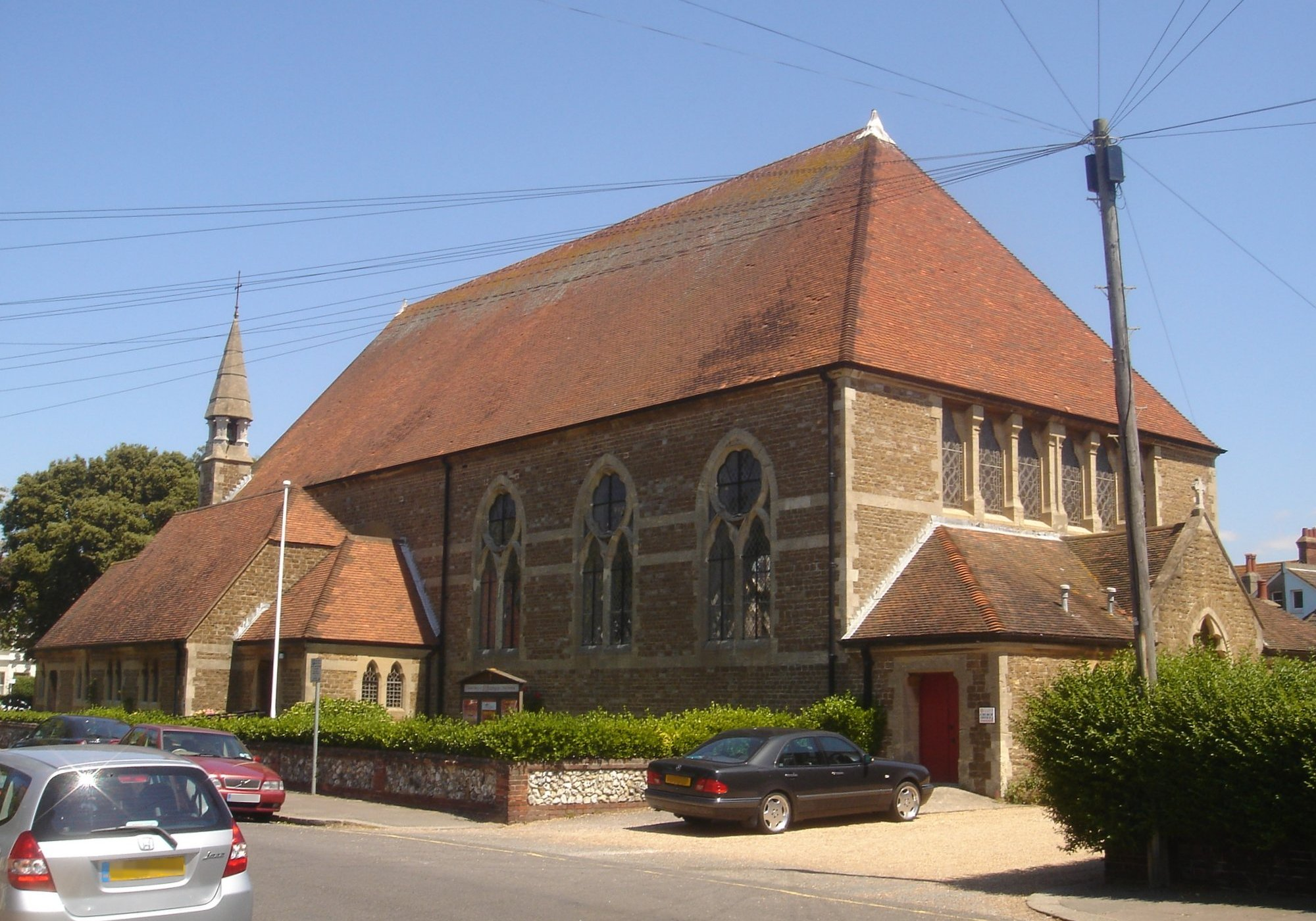
- The church from the southwest
- St George's Church
- 50.8142°N 0.3573°W
- Location: St George's Road, Worthing, West Sussex BN11 2DS
- Country: England
- Denomination: Church of England
- Tradition: Conservative evangelical
- Website: Church website

History
- Status: Parish church
- Founded: 1868
- Dedication: Saint George
- Consecrated: 10 July 1868

Architecture
- Functional status: Active
- Heritage designation: Grade C (Equivalent to Grade II)
- Designated: 21 May 1976
- Architect: George Truefitt
- Style: Decorated Gothic
- Groundbreaking: 1867
- Completed: 1868
- Construction cost: Approximately £5,000 (£489,000 in 2025)

Administration
- Province: Province of Canterbury
- Diocese: Diocese of Chichester
- Archdeaconry: Archdeaconry of Chichester
- Deanery: Rural Deanery of Worthing
- Parish: Worthing, St George

Clergy
- Vicar: The Revd John Brook

St George's Church is an Anglican church in the East Worthing area of the borough of Worthing, one of seven local government districts in the English county of West Sussex. Built in 1867–68 to serve new residential development in the southeast of the town, the Decorated Gothic-style structure was extended later in the 19th century, and expanded its reach further by founding three mission halls elsewhere in Worthing. English Heritage has listed it at Grade C for its architectural and historical importance.

== History ==
Worthing experienced rapid development in the first quarter of the 19th century, encouraged by royal patronage and the effect of nearby Brighton—one of England's most fashionable and desirable resorts at the time. In the first few decades of the town's existence, however, little building work took place east of the road from Broadwater to the coast: the land was marshy and difficult to develop. The few houses in existence were economically dependent on the 18th-century brickworks and two smock mills in the vicinity, both of which existed by 1831.

Gradually, the town expanded to the east, and in the 1860s a church was proposed to serve the area, which had become known as East Worthing. Work started in 1867, when the Bishop of Chichester Ashurst Turner Gilbert laid the foundation stone. The architect George Truefitt was commissioned to design the church. In its original form, it opened on 10 July 1868 after Bishop Gilbert consecrated it. Long-time East Worthing resident Alfred Longley, who wrote several books about the area, recorded the name of the builder as a Mr Longhurst.

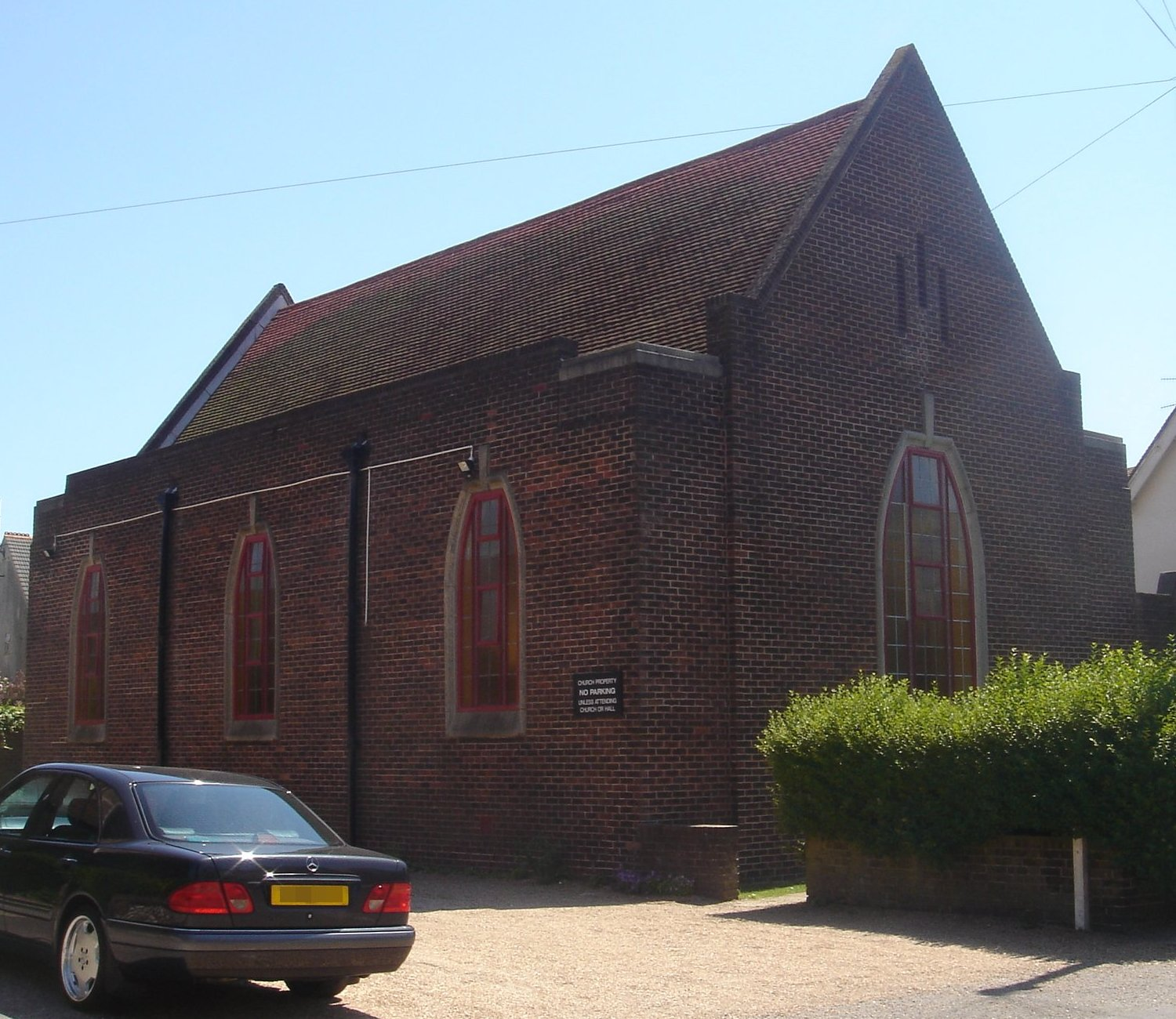
H. Overnell's church hall dates from 1935.

St George's Church was extended twice in the first 16 years of its existence. As built in 1868, it consisted of a chancel with apsidal end, nave and a small belfry. In 1875, two porches and a vestry were built. Nine years later, the interior was changed by the addition of a transept between the nave and the sanctuary. A tower was planned, but only a stump was ever built. Architectural sketches of the proposed tower showed a tall, spire-topped structure with lancet openings rising at the southwest corner. Architect H. Overnell designed the church hall, which stands to the south, in 1935. A vicarage was established in nearby Selden Road in the early 1900s.

The church was always parished: in 1867, a parish was created out of the southeastern part of the area administered by St Mary's Church at Broadwater. The advowson originally lay with the rector of that church, but passed to the National Protestant Church Union in 1903. Its successor, the Church Society Trust, retains it. The rector had owned the land originally, and offered it free of charge to allow the church to be built.

St George's Church founded a school in the parish in 1874. St George's National School stood on Lyndhurst Road (50.8146°N 0.3676°W); its popularity resulted in the brick and flint buildings being enlarged twice by 1897, but in 1940 it was closed and the pupils dispersed to other schools. In 1985, the site was cleared to make way for a supermarket.

== Architecture ==
St George's Church has been praised for its architectural quality, especially in view of its relatively low cost of construction: the budget was set at £5,000 (equivalent to £489,000 in 2025). Unusually, it was built on a north–south alignment, so the geographical and ritual directions are different. The building is in the Decorated Gothic style with some Perpendicular Gothic elements, and is of Bargate stone rubble with courses of ashlar. The roof is covered with red tiles.

The plan features a wide chancel and aisled nave, both of which have prominent apses at the geographical north end, a gable-roofed entrance porch leading to a narthex with hipped roofs, a small belfry topped with a stone spirelet, and a vestry. Most of the windows are small lancets, such as the range of six above the entrance porch, but the five around the chancel apse are taller. The interior is simple and open, and reminded architectural historians Ian Nairn and Nikolaus Pevsner of Sir Christopher Wren's ecclesiastical works: they described it as "very intelligent, rational, [...] logical [and lacking] the artificial piety of the 1860s".

== Mission chapels ==
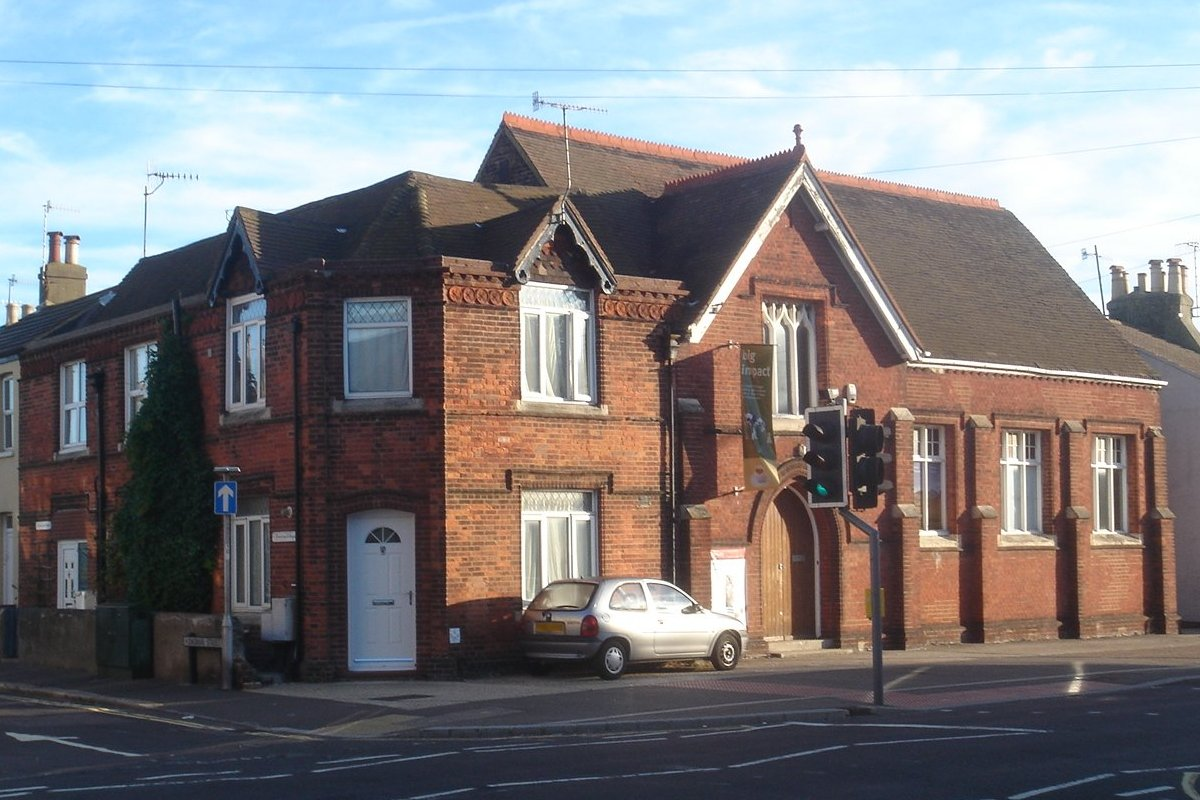
Newland Road Mission Hall was built in 1883.

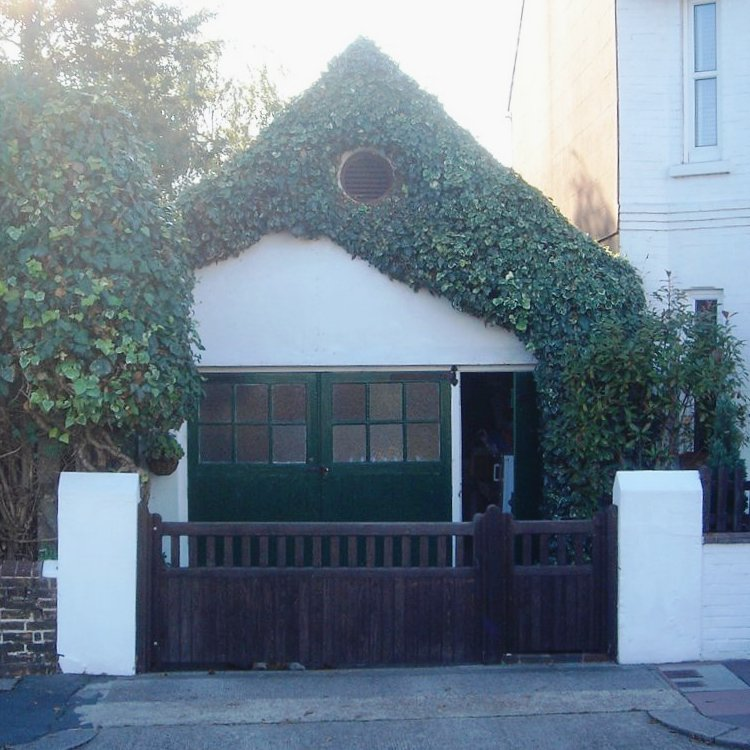
The Ham Arch Mission is now a garage.

Many mission chapels, or mission halls, were established in Worthing in the late 19th and early 20th century, as the population grew faster than the existing parish churches could cater for. Such buildings were rudimentary chapels of ease served by the clergy of the founding church, and were intended to be used temporarily until proper provision could be made for worship, in the form of a new permanent church or an extension to an existing building. Three such chapels were established by St George's Church; two still stand, and the other became a separate church in its own right before being demolished.

Newland Road Mission Hall was the first to be established. It was built in 1883 at the corner of Newland Road and Station Road (50.8184°N 0.3686°W). The brick building was used for worship until 1936, and is now used as a studio. Two years later, the tiny Ham Arch Mission was created in a hut on Ham Road (50.8194°N 0.3538°W) in the east of the parish. The structure, one of the smallest places of worship in Sussex and now used as a garage, was referred to in jest as "The Cathedral" by locals during its 29 years of religious use. The Emmanuel Mission Hall, on Brougham Road (50.8169°N 0.3507°W), was built in 1911 and replaced by an octagonal permanent church, also dedicated to Emmanuel, in 1976. This was closed and demolished in 2008.

== The church today ==
St George's Church was listed at Grade C by English Heritage on 21 May 1976. Grade C was the lowest rank on an old grading system used for Anglican churches, before English Heritage extended the standard Grade I, II* and II scheme to all types of building. A small number of churches remain on the old scheme, on which Grade C is equivalent to Grade II. In February 2001, it was one of 198 Grade II- or C-listed buildings, and 213 listed buildings of all grades, in the Borough of Worthing. (These totals have since changed because of new listings and delistings.)

The parish covers the southeastern part of Worthing borough. Its boundaries are the railway line to the north, the border with Adur district to the east, the English Channel to the south and the High Street and Steyne to the west.

Worship is in a Conservative Evangelical style in the Anglican tradition, mostly using the Common Worship series of worship materials. There is one service on Sunday, a service of morning worship and prayer. Holy Communion occurs once a month and on special occasions.

== See also ==
- List of places of worship in Worthing

== Notes ==
=== Bibliography ===
- Elleray, D. Robert (1977). Worthing: a Pictorial History. Chichester: Phillimore & Co. ISBN 0-85033-263-X.
- Elleray, D. Robert (1985). Worthing: Aspects of Change. Chichester: Phillimore & Co. ISBN 0-85033-551-5.
- Elleray, D. Robert (1998). A Millennium Encyclopaedia of Worthing History. Worthing: Optimus Books. ISBN 0-9533132-0-4.
- Elleray, D. Robert (2004). Sussex Places of Worship. Worthing: Optimus Books. ISBN 0-9533132-7-1.
- Kerridge, Ronald; Standing, Michael (2000). Worthing: From Saxon Settlement to Seaside Town. Worthing: Optimus Books. ISBN 0-9533132-4-7.
- Nairn, Ian; Pevsner, Nikolaus (1965). The Buildings of England: Sussex. Harmondsworth: Penguin Books. ISBN 0-14-071028-0.
