= T. N. Pearce's XI =

Cricket Team

T. N. Pearce's XI was a scratch cricket team composed largely of Test and other prominent first-class players.

Between 1951 and 1974, T. N. Pearce's XI played an annual first-class match at the end of the English cricket season against the touring team. The match was part of the annual Scarborough Cricket Festival and, though played in a spirit of some conviviality, it often produced highly competitive games with outstanding performances. It was usually the last first-class match of the season.

The T. N. Pearce side was selected and organised by Tom Pearce, who had captained Essex between 1933 and 1950 and was an England Test selector for many years after his retirement from playing. Before Pearce took on the organisation of the side, a similar match had been organised at the Scarborough Festival by H. D. G. Leveson-Gower, and before Leveson-Gower by Charles Thornton.

Further matches were played in the 1976 and 1978 seasons, but the festival then lapsed for a few years and when it was revived in the 1980s, the scratch side was first organised (and sometimes led) by Brian Close and then by the TV personality Michael Parkinson.
