= Civil Service cricket team =

UK cricket team

A Civil Service cricket team made just one appearance in first-class cricket, when they played the touring New Zealanders, who were on their first tour of England, at the Civil Service Sports Ground in Chiswick in 1927. The New Zealanders proved too strong for their hosts, winning by an innings and 15 runs, although the result might have been different had Jackie Mills (104*) and Cyril Allcott (102*) not shared an unbroken stand of 190 for the eighth wicket to allow the New Zealanders to declare at 421/7.

For the Civil Service, the best performer with the bat was Edwin Bennett, who hit 73 and 60, while the best bowling came from Allinson Chapman, playing his one and only first-class match, who claimed 3-73 from his 21 overs. The team was captained by Reginald Collins, the brother of the Australia Test captain Herbie Collins.

The team also played the touring Australians in 1926 and the West Indians in 1928, both matches being of two days' duration and not first-class.

== Civil Service v New Zealanders, 1927 ==
16–19 July 1927
(3-day match)
Scorecard

Civil Service	v	New Zealanders
256 (93.4 overs); EH Bennett 73; CFW Allcott 2/23 (6.4 overs)		421/7dec (123.2 overs); JE Mills 104*; AG Chapman 3/73 (21 overs)
150 (53 overs); EH Bennett 60; M Henderson 5/27 (14 overs)

New Zealanders won by an innings and 15 runs
Civil Service Sports Ground, Chiswick
Umpires: HR Butt and A Morton

- Civil Service won the toss and elected to bat
- 17 July was taken as a rest day
