= Bode Thomas =

Nigerian politician

- Born: Olabode Akanbi Thomas; October 1919; Lagos, Nigeria
- Died: 23 November 1953 (aged 34)
- Occupation: Politician
- Known for: First Nigeria Minister of Transportation

Chief Bode Thomas (born Olabode Akanbi Thomas; October 1919 – 23 November 1953) was a Nigerian lawyer, politician, statesman and traditional aristocrat. Thomas served as both a colonial minister of the Colony and Protectorate of Nigeria and a nobleman and privy counsellor of the historic Oyo Kingdom of Yorubaland at a time when his country was still under British colonial rule before her independence in the 1960s. He was Nigeria's first Minister of Transportation.

== Early life ==
Olabode Thomas was born to the family of Andrew Thomas, a wealthy trader and auctioneer who was originally from Oyo but moved to Lagos. He was a great-grandson of the Alaafin Abiodun of Oyo. He attended C.M.S. Grammar School, a missionary school founded by Thomas Babington Macaulay and James Pinson Labulo Davies. After completing his studies, he served as a junior clerk at the Nigerian Railway Corporation but towards the end of the year, he resigned his appointment and went to London to study law. He was called to the bar in 1942 and returned to Nigeria to establish what became a successful practice in Lagos. In 1948, together with Chief Frederick Rotimi Williams and Chief Remilekun Fani-Kayode he set up a Nigerian law firm, called "Thomas, Williams and Kayode".

== Political career ==
In 1946, he became the legal adviser of Egbe Omo Oduduwa and was one of the founding members of the Action Group. Prior to joining Action Group, he was a successful Lagos lawyer and was a member of the Nigerian Youth Movement. He is credited as the first prominent Nigerian member of the political elite during the colonial era to make a strong case for regional-based political parties, which, he believed would be equipped with the necessary knowledge to develop their regions and also form a coalition at the center. He was also a leading advocate for the bringing of tribal chiefs and kings into the expanding fold of the Action Group. To this policy, he undoubtedly gave much of his own experience as the Balogun of Oyo — a title he received in 1949. The strategy later proved to be a potent framework for mass mobilization in some towns. Thomas and Awolowo sometimes had rival political thoughts, many of which were never settled before his death. Most of his ideas on regional parties, which ended up becoming approximated with the early self-government political structure, were never fully reconciled with Awolowo's ideas, which were based on federalism.

In 1951, Thomas represented the Western region as Minister of Transport under the McPherson Constitution and an advocate for self governance in Nigeria. He resigned from the portfolio during a constitutional crisis in March 1953. He later became Minister of Works after a Constitutional Conference in London.

Thomas was regarded as a brilliant but very arrogant man who had strained relationships with some of the local leaders like Sir Ahmadu Bello and Alaafin Adeyemi II. He was said to have been rude to the Alaafin at an Oyo Divisional Council meeting because the Alaafin did not stand up in reverence to him (he was the chairman of the council while the Alaafin was a member, but this was in itself an aberration - as the Balogun of Oyo, Chief Thomas was traditionally one of the Alaafin's retainers). He was a leader of a group that included the majority of the Oyo Mesi who were against the rule of Alaafin Adeyemi on the grounds that the Alaafin was against the capitalization of taxes used to finance education and health.

== Personal life ==
Thomas was married to Lucretia Shobola Odunsi. Among his children are Eniola, Dapo, Vera and Tokunbo. He was chancellor of the African Church of Nigeria and was an editorial board member of the Daily Service. He was sometimes outspoken and this made him incur enemies.

== Later life and death ==
On 22 November 1953, after returning from Oyo, Thomas became ill at his Lagos home. He was taken to Ijebu-Igbo for treatment but eventually died in Ijebu-Igbo on 23 November 1953 which was his daughter's second birthday.
