= Matt Henderson (cricketer) =

New Zealand cricketer

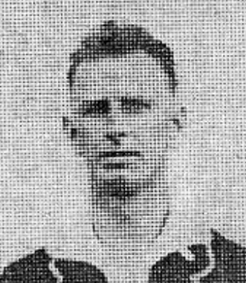
- Henderson pictured in 1927

Personal information
- Full name: Matthew Henderson
- Born: 2 August 1895; Auckland, New Zealand
- Died: 17 June 1970 (aged 74); Lower Hutt, Wellington, New Zealand
- Batting: Left-handed
- Bowling: Left-arm fast-medium

International information
- National side: New Zealand (1930)
- Only Test (cap 6): 10 January 1930 v England

Domestic team information
- Years: Team
- 1921/22–1931/32: Wellington

Career statistics
| Competition | Test | First-class |
|---|---|---|
| Matches | 1 | 41 |
| Runs scored | 8 | 495 |
| Batting average | 8.00 | 14.14 |
| 100s/50s | 0/0 | 0/0 |
| Top score | 6 | 47 |
| Balls bowled | 90 | 6,649 |
| Wickets | 2 | 107 |
| Bowling average | 32.00 | 29.90 |
| 5 wickets in innings | 0 | 5 |
| 10 wickets in match | 0 | 0 |
| Best bowling | 2/38 | 6/70 |
| Catches/stumpings | 1/– | 12/– |
- Source: Cricinfo, 30 April 2023

Matthew Henderson (2 August 1895 – 17 June 1970) was a New Zealand cricketer who played for Wellington from 1922 to 1932 and played in New Zealand's first-ever Test match in January 1930.

== Cricket career ==
Henderson was a left-arm fast-medium bowler and tail-end batsman who made his first-class debut for Wellington in 1921–22, taking 5 for 66 against Auckland in his second match. In the 1926–27 season he took 12 wickets in two matches at an average of 17.75, including 6 for 70 against Auckland.

Henderson toured England with the 1927 team under Tom Lowry. No Tests were played on this tour. Henderson took 33 first-class wickets at 24.21, including 5 for 27 against the Civil Service and 5 for 76 against Leicestershire, but his bowling, according to Wisden, lacked direction.

Henderson's only Test appearance was the first Test ever played by New Zealand, against the England team led by Harold Gilligan at Christchurch in January 1930, when he was 34. He dismissed Eddie Dawson with his first delivery and later took the wicket of K. S. Duleepsinhji, the top scorer. But New Zealand lost in two days and he was replaced for the Second Test by his Wellington team-mate, the all-rounder Eddie McLeod.

Henderson never played Test cricket again, and dropped out of first-class cricket in 1932 after three more games for Wellington. In a long career in Wellington club cricket he took 333 wickets at 21.90.

Henderson died on 17 June 1970, in Lower Hutt, Wellington, aged 74.
