= King's House Sports Ground =

Sports ground in Chiswick, London, England

Coordinates: 51.4767°N 0.2543°W

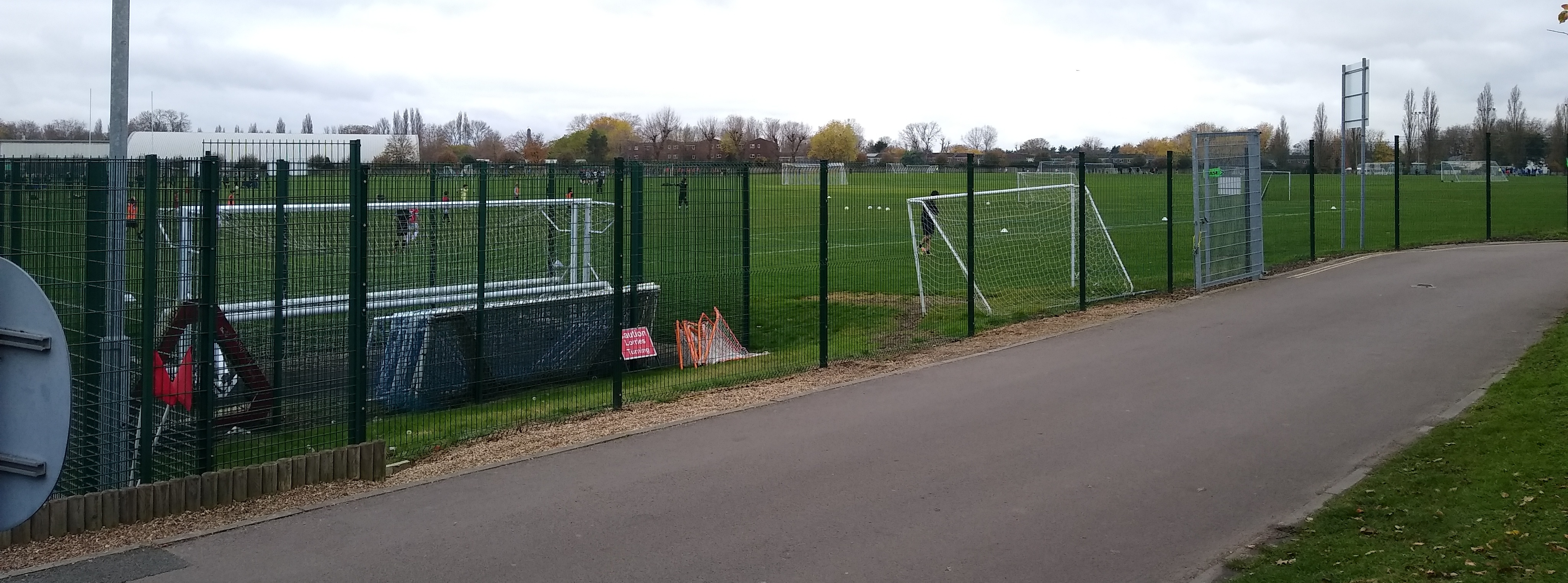
- Interactive map of King's House Sports Ground

Ground information
- Location: Chiswick, London, W4 2SH
- Country: England
- Establishment: 1926 (first recorded match)

International information
- Only women's ODI: 26 July 1993: New Zealand v West Indies

Team information
Civil Service	(1927)
- As of 6 September 2020; Source: Ground profile

King's House Sports Ground (formally known as the Civil Service Sports Ground) is a multi-use sports ground in Chiswick, London. King George V presided over the official opening in 1926 and inspected the teams. The first recorded cricket match on the ground was in 1926, when the Civil Service cricket team played Australia in a non first-class match. The following year, the ground held its only first-class match when the Civil Service played the touring New Zealanders. This match was also the Civil Service's only appearance in first-class cricket.

The ground held a single Second XI Championship match in 1973 when the Middlesex Second XI played the Kent Second XI.

During the 1993 Women's Cricket World Cup, the ground held its only Women's One Day International when New Zealand women played the West Indies.

Since 2010 the Sports Ground has been managed by King's House School. The school has overseen many new developments to facilities, including a new 3G and all-weather pitch.
