= Independent National Electoral Commission (Nigeria) =

Nigerian national electoral body

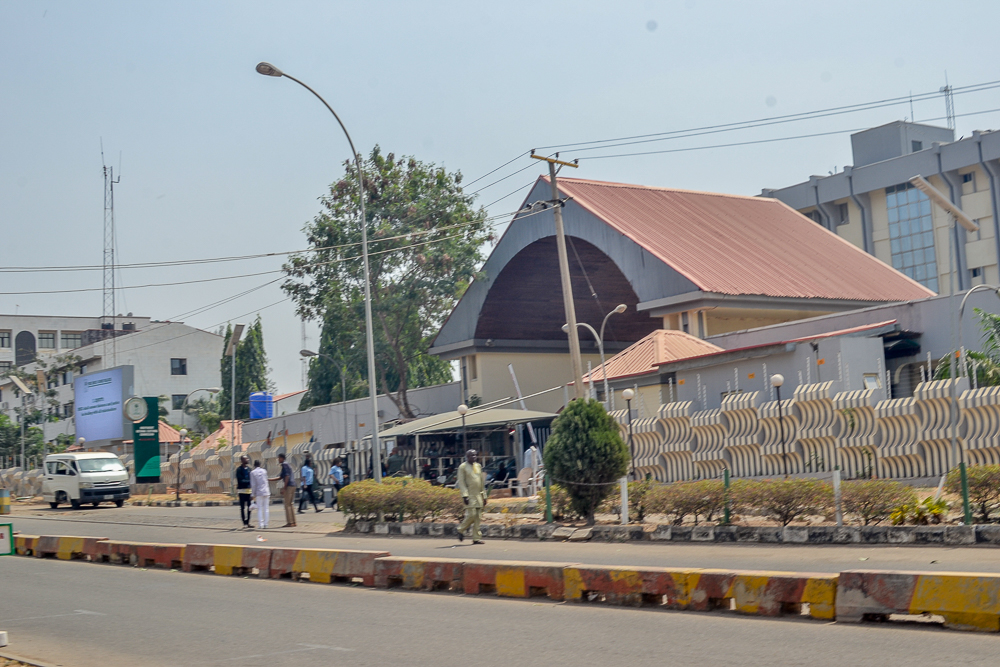
- INEC headquarters, 2019

Agency overview
- Formed: 1998
- Preceding agency: National Electoral Commission of Nigeria (NECON)
- Jurisdiction: Federal Government of Nigeria
- Headquarters: Abuja
- Agency executive: Joash Ojo Amupitan, Chairman
- Website: https://inecnigeria.org

The Independent National Electoral Commission (INEC) is the federal electoral management body responsible for organising and supervising elections in Nigeria. Its constitutional responsibilities include elections for the offices of President, vice-president, state governors and deputy governors, as well as elections to the National Assembly and state houses of assembly. INEC also registers and monitors political parties and maintains the national register of voters.

The present commission was established in 1998 shortly before Nigeria's transition from military to civilian rule. INEC is currently chaired by Joash Amupitan, who was sworn into office on 23 October 2025.

== History ==
=== Regulation and administration of elections ===
The administration of democratic elections in Nigeria dates back to the period before Independence when the Electoral Commission of Nigeria (ECN) was inaugurated in 1958 to conduct the 1959 federal elections. Prior to 1958, regional laws and government regulated and conducted elections. ECN was headed by an expatriate, Ronald Edward Wraith and four Nigerian members representing each region and the Federal Capital Territory of Lagos. The Federal Electoral Commission, established in 1960, conducted the immediate post-independence federal and regional elections of 1964 and 1965. Prior to the conduct of the 1964 election, the Chief Electoral Officer, Kofo Abayomi resigned and some party officials from the NCNC and Action Group doubted the credibility of a free and fair election. The electoral body was dissolved after the military coup of 1966 in Nigeria. In 1978, a new Federal Electoral Commission (FEDECO) was constituted by the regime of General Olusegun Obasanjo, organizing the elections of 1979 which ushered in the Nigerian Second Republic under the leadership of Alhaji Shehu Shagari. It also conducted the general elections of 1983.

In December 1995, the military government under the leadership of general Sani Abacha established the National Electoral Commission of Nigeria (NECON) which conducted another set of elections. These elected institutions were not inaugurated before the sudden death of General Abacha in June 1998 aborted the process. In 1998, General Abdulsalam Abubakar's Administration dissolved National Electoral Commission of Nigeria and established the Independent National Electoral Commission (INEC). INEC organized the transitional elections that ushered in the Nigerian Fourth Republic on May 29, 1999.

The chairman of the first Nigerian Federal Electoral Commission was Chief Eyo Esua (1964–1966) in the First Republic. When General Olusegun Obasanjo prepared for a return to civilian power in the Second Republic, he established a new Federal Electoral Commission headed by Chief Michael Ani to supervise the 1979 elections. Ani was succeeded by Justice Victor Ovie Whisky. During the Ibrahim Babangida and Sani Abacha regimes, which attempted returns to democracy, the National Electoral Commission of Nigeria was headed by professor Eme Awa (1987–1989), professor Humphrey Nwosu (1989–1993), professor Okon Uya and chief Sumner Dagogo-Jack (1994–1998).

== Leadership ==
General Abdulsalami Abubakar established the current INEC, with Justice Ephraim Akpata as chairman. Akpata had to deal with 26 applications for party, but approving only nine for the 1998/1999 elections, eventually reduced to three. Despite efforts to ensure free and fair elections, the process drew serious criticism from international observers. After Akpata died in January 2000, the government of President Olusegun Obasanjo appointed Abel Guobadia Nigeria's Chief Electoral Officer, a position that was confirmed by the Nigerian Senate in May 2000. Guobadia was responsible for the 2003 elections, which were marred by widespread violence and other irregularities.

In June 2005, Guobadia retired and was succeeded by professor Maurice Iwu. Soon after being appointed, Iwu announced that foreign monitors would not be allowed during elections, but only foreign election observers. This decision was condemned by politicians and civil society groups who called for his immediate removal from office. The conduct of the 2007 elections was again criticized as falling below acceptable democratic standards.

On 8 June 2010, professor Attahiru Muhammadu Jega was nominated by President Goodluck Jonathan as the new INEC Chairman, subject to Senate confirmation, as a replacement for Iwu, who had vacated the post on 28 April 2010. Jega's nomination as INEC chairman followed approval by a meeting of the National Council of State called by President Jonathan and attended by former heads of state Yakubu Gowon, Muhammadu Buhari, Ibrahim Babangida, Abdulsalami Abubakar, Ernest Shonekan, Olusegun Obasanjo and Shehu Shagari. The Senate President David Mark, Speaker of the House of Representatives Oladimeji Bankole, and most of the state Governors also attended the meeting. Unanimous approval by the council of the nominee for this critical appointment avoided controversy about whether or not the President should appoint the chairman of the INEC. Reactions to the announcement from a broad spectrum of political leaders and organisations were positive, although some voiced concern that it could be too late to implement real reforms before the 2011 elections.

During the campaign for the 2015 Nigerian general elections, Attahiru Jega "faced fierce criticism from both the opposition and the ruling party." Attahiru Jega's five-year term came to an end on June 30, 2015, and though he was qualified for re-appointment, the chances of such became remote given the allegations of bias against him by campaign officials of President Goodluck. President Mohammadu Buhari appointed professor Mahmood Yakubu as INEC Chairman, Yakubu took over from Amina Bala-Zakari, who was the acting chairman after Jega left.

Mahmood Yakubu was succeeded by May Agbamuche-Mbu, in October 7, 2025, as Acting Chairperson, after the former's completion of a second five-year tenure. On 8 October 2025, Joash Amupitan, a professor of law and Senior Advocate of Nigeria was finally nominated as the INEC Chairman, replacing Agbamuche-Mbu. The Senate confirmed his appointment on 16 October 2025, and he was sworn in by President Bola Tinubu on 23 October 2025.

List of chairpersons
S/N	Name	Year (duration)	Capacity	Major Election supervised
1	Justice Ephraim Akpata	1998–2000	Chairman	1999 General Election
2	Dr. Abel Guobadia	2000–2005	Chairman	2003 General Election
3	Prof. Maurice Iwu	2005–2010	Chairman	2007 General Election
4	Prof. Attahiru Jega	2010–2015	Chairman	2011 and 2015 General Elections
5	Amina Bala Zakari	30 June 2015 – 9 November 2015	Acting Chairperson	N/A
6	Prof. Mahmood Yakubu	2015–2025	Chairman	2019 and 2023
7	May Agbamuche–Mbu	7 October 2025 – 9 October 2025	Acting Chairperson	N/A
8	Prof. Joash Amupitan	October 2025–present	Chairman	2027 General Election Preparations

== Electoral technology and results management ==
INEC has progressively introduced electronic systems for voter accreditation and the publication of polling-unit results. The INEC Result Viewing portal (IReV) was first deployed during the Nasarawa Central State Constituency bye-election in August 2020. The portal enables polling unit result sheets to be uploaded and made available for public viewing.

The commission subsequently developed the Bimodal Voter Accreditation System (BVAS), which uses fingerprint or facial recognition to authenticate registered voters. BVAS was first deployed in the Isoko South I State Constituency bye-election in Delta State in September 2021. It was subsequently used in the November 2021 Anambra State governorship election, which the Nigeria Civil Society Situation Room described as the first major election in which INEC deployed the system.

BVAS and IReV perform related but distinct functions. While BVAS is used at polling units for biometric voter accreditation and can also capture images of polling unit results for upload, IReV is the online platform through which the uploaded result forms are made publicly accessible.

The 2023 general elections was the first Nigerian election in which BVAS and IReV were deployed nationwide. The European Union Election Observation Mission reported that BVAS was generally able to accredit voters without significant problems on both election days. It separately reported substantial delays in the uploading and publication of presidential polling-unit result forms on IReV. At the time the presidential result was declared, more than one quarter of the presidential polling-unit result forms were still unavailable on the portal. The mission concluded that the delays and limited transparency surrounding the implementation of the technology contributed to reduced public confidence in the results process.

The legal status of the technologies was strengthened by the Electoral Act 2026, which repealed the Electoral Act 2022. Section 47 of the 2026 Act expressly provides for the use of BVAS, or another technological device prescribed by INEC, for voter accreditation. Section 60 requires polling-unit results to be electronically transmitted to the IReV portal after the prescribed result form has been completed and signed. Where electronic transmission is impossible because of communication failure, the Act provides that the signed Form EC8A remains the primary source for collation and declaration of the result.

== Controversies ==
The INEC has encountered several controversies in the run-up to elections in the country, most notably the April 2007 general elections, including criticism about its preparedness from Sa'ad Abubakar, Sultan of Sokoto and a dispute over its "disqualification" of Vice president Atiku Abubakar's candidacy. The Supreme Court ruled that the INEC can not disqualify candidates, so Abubakar's name was added to ballots at the last minute.

On the subject of election irregularities, INEC spokesman Philip Umeadi said on April 19, 2007, that "We are not sitting on any crisis in Nigeria". The mission of INEC is to serve as an independent and effective Election Management Bodies (EMB) committed to the conduct of free, fair and credible elections for sustainable democracy in Nigeria. The vision of INEC is to be one of the best Election Management Bodies (EMB) in the world that meets the aspirations of the Nigerian people.

In January 2015, the "#BringBackOurGirls group raised the alarm over plans by the Independent National Electoral Commission (INEC) to exclude Chibok and some communities currently under the control of the Boko Haram from getting the permanent voter cards (PVCs) for the February elections."

In the buildup to 2015 general elections, the INEC under Jega introduced smart card reader for the verification of voters and their voting cards to minimize incidence of fraud and rigging. The introduction of card readers was hailed by many Nigerians but a group of four minor political parties who claimed to be acting on behalf of 15 political parties kicked against it and urged the INEC to suspend the use of card readers in the 2015 elections. The 2015 general elections were adjudged the most credible, free and fair elections since the return of democracy in 1999.

The INEC was accused of widespread electoral irregularities in the 2019 presidential elections including cases of ballot paper unavailability, smart card readers malfunctioning, and large cancellation of valid votes. The main opposition People's Democratic Party and its presidential candidate challenged the results of the election in court.

== INEC State Offices ==
Each state office is led by a Resident Electoral Commissioner (REC). State offices include those in:

- Abia State: On 2 August 2015, some parts of the office which is headquartered at Obingwa local government was burnt down by political thugs during the 2015 Nigerian general election. The REC is Sylvester Ezeani.
- Rivers State: The branch office is at Plot 236, Aba Road, Port Harcourt. RECs include Gesila Khan Aniedi Ikoiwak and Obo Effanga (April 2018 to date).

== 2023 presidential election and legal challenges ==
Following the announcement of the 2023 Nigerian presidential election, both Atiku Abubakar and Peter Obi filed petitions before the Presidential Election Petition Tribunal (PEPT), challenging the results. Their petitions alleged widespread irregularities, technical failures in INEC’s electronic transmission of results, and non-compliance with provisions of the Electoral Act.

INEC denied allegations of malpractice, maintaining that the election was conducted in substantial compliance with the law. To defend its position, the Commission appointed a team of Senior Advocates of Nigeria led by Abubakar Balarabe Mahmoud. The team included Oluwakemi Pinheiro, Stephen Adehi, Miannaya Essien, and Abdullahi Aliyu.

On 6 September 2023, the Presidential Election Petition Tribunal dismissed the petitions, ruling that the opposition parties failed to prove substantial non-compliance or fraud. The Tribunal upheld INEC’s declaration of Bola Tinubu as president-elect. On 26 October 2023, the Supreme Court of Nigeria affirmed the Tribunal’s judgment, dismissing the appeals filed by Obi and Atiku as lacking merit.

== 2027 presidential election ==
On 19 August 2026, INEC lifted the campaign ban for the 2027 Nigeria general election.

On February 5th, 2026, INEC approved the registration of new political parties - Nigeria Democratic Congress (NDC) and Democratic Leadership Alliance (DLA).
