= F.O.M. Atake =

Nigerian Jurist (1926–2003)

The honourable Justice Franklin Oritse-Mueyiwa Atake
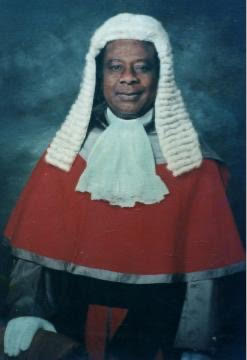

Personal details
- Born: 6 May 1926 Sapele, Southern Region, British Nigeria (Now Sapele, Delta State, Nigeria)
- Died: 1 March 2003 (aged 76)
- Spouse: Victoria Arugha Patricia Atake (née Foss)
- Relatives: Eyimofe Atake (son)
- Education: University of London; Inns of Court School of Law
- Occupation: Barrister, judge, public officer

Franklin Oritse-Mueyiwa Atake (6 May 1926 – 1 March 2003) known by his initials FOM Atake was a Nigerian Jurist and Senator of the Federal Republic of Nigeria from 1979 to 1983 during the Nigerian Second Republic.

== Early life ==
Franklin Atake was born on 6 May 1926 in Sapele, a town in the British Colony of Southern Nigeria. He received education at Baptist School, Sapele, where he excelled as a chorister. Additionally, he attended St. Luke's Church Missionary Society School, also located in Sapele. Franklin Atake had his secondary school education in Ibadan Grammar School. In Ibadan Grammar school, Franklin Atake was quite proficient in Latin and often used sophisticated Latin words or phrases in school in his daily conversations. As a result, he was nicknamed: "Atakurus Esse". Whenever he was called "Atakurus Esse", he answered: "God bless you my brother". Atake passed from Ibadan Grammar School with exemption from London Matriculation. Thereafter, he worked in the Treasury Department in Lagos until 1951. In 1951, he left for England to study law. He studied law at the University of London and at the Inns of Court School of Law, London. He was called to the English Bar on 18 May 1954 by the Honourable Society of Lincoln's Inn. By June 1954, he was back in Nigeria. He was enrolled in Nigeria as a Barrister and Solicitor on Friday 16 June 1954. Thus, making him the four hundred and seventh (417th) person to do so on the all-time list of persons so enrolled to practice law in Nigeria.

== Career ==
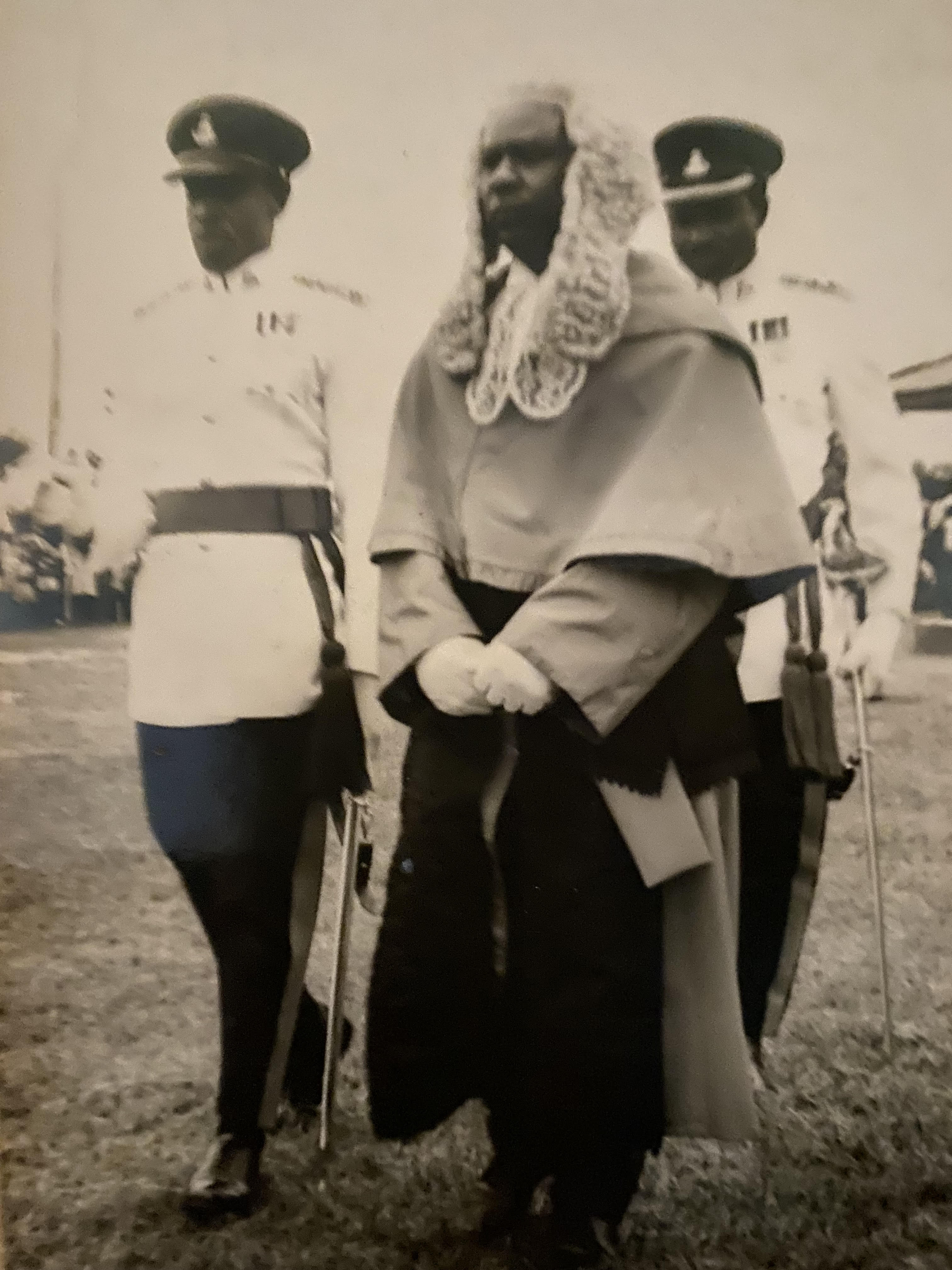
The Honourable Justice Franklin Oritse-Mueyiwa Atake as an assize Judge in 1967

Having been enrolled to practice law in Nigeria, Atake established his legal practice in Sapele and Warri. After a few years in practice in the 1950s, he opted for the Magisterial Bench in the British Colony of Lagos.

== As a magistrate ==
In 1957, he was appointed a magistrate in the British Colony of Lagos. He sat in what was well known as the Tapa Court in Lagos. As a magistrate, Franklin Atake handled many cases and became well known for the speed and sense of justice with which he dealt with cases that came before him. In no time the then Chief Justice of the British Colony of Lagos and the Southern Cameroons, The Honourable Sir Clement Nageon De Lestang, CJ, transferred him temporarily to the Cameroons to handle a large backlog of cases. On his return from the Cameroons, he was elevated to the position of Senior Magistrate in 1959.

== Rise to prominence ==
Atake handled many cases as a Magistrate, but charge no. 28175/60 – Police v. AK-N-, AK-NS-L; A-L-B and Ors. is often referred to. It was a case of unlawful assembly by students at the University College, Ibadan who had organized a demonstration in Lagos on the 28 November 1960 at the Tafawa Balewa Square. The students were protesting vehemently against a defence pact that Nigeria was to enter with Great Britain. The protests got completely out of hand and the students who held out against anti-riot police jumped over the fences into Parliament buildings destroying most of the furniture and beating up anyone in sight. Some prominent Parliamentarians such as Chief Festus Okotie-Eboh (Federal Minister for Finance) and Chief T. O. S. Benson (Federal Minister for Information) were caused bodily harm. Messrs Adewale Thompson, A K I Makanju, Aliyi Ekineh, Sobo Sowemimo and some others acted for the students. The Defense Counsel, in that case, advised their clients, the students, to plead guilty in the hope that they would convince the Magistrate, His Worship, Franklin Atake not to impose a prison sentence since most of the students were in their final year and imprisonment would completely ruin their chances of completing their studies. Mr. Adewale Thompson, having addressed the court at length about the harm imprisonment would cause to the lives of the students and that the students meant no harm, Franklin Atake condemned the action of the students and accepted the plea of counsel to caution and discharge them, adding that they should be bound over to be of good behaviour for twelve months. Said Mr. Justice Adewale Thompson writing in 1991 in his book Reminiscences At The Bar at 65:

"We had advised the students to plead guilty so that I could address the court in Allocutus under section 450 of the Criminal Procedure Ordinance, requesting the magistrate to exercise his discretion to dismiss the charge because of the hardship a conviction will cause to the career of the students who were in their final year at the University College. That discretion included a decision of the magistrate to convict, which was not subject to appeal. It was therefore a gamble that was taken because I had implicit confidence in the competence of the magistrate and his courage to do what was proper in the overall interest of society. He was not the type who would be afraid in such a sensitive case, in which parliamentarians had been assaulted and Parliament itself invaded. I am sure our gamble would have failed if that matter had come before another magistrate with timorous proclivities."

With the creation of the Mid-Western Region, Nigeria in 1963, Franklin Atake left Lagos to take an appointment as Chief Magistrate in Warri. He served also as a Chief Magistrate in Benin before the civil war in Nigeria broke out. At the outbreak of the civil war, he was appointed a Judge of the High Court of Justice in the Mid-Western, Nigeria in 1967.

== A judge of the High Court of Justice Mid-Western Nigeria ==
Atake was appointed a judge of the High Court of the Midwestern Nigeria in 1967 along with three other judges. They are the Hon. Justice Victor Ovie Whisky, Hon. Justice S O Ighodaro and the Hon. Justice M A Aghoghovbia. He was 41 years old. He was assigned to the Sapele Division to join the Hon. Justice E A Ekeruche and the Hon. Justice Akinwunmi Rhodes-Vivour. Other brother Judges at the time of his appointment included: Hon. Justices Mason Begho (Chief Justice, Mid-West), J O Izuora, Andrews Otutu Obaseki, Ayo Gabriel Irikefe, Arthur Edward Prest, J. Omo-Eboh and Uche Omo. Atake served in various judicial divisions of the High Court in the Mid-West that included the Benin, Warri and Agbor divisions. He handled a wide range of cases. It is on record that he was quick in the uptake. In his court, the dispensation of justice was fast and quick. He was highly principled, strong-willed. That reputation still precedes him in all the divisions he served either as a Magistrate or as a Judge of the High Court. Said Ephraim Akpata, a retired Justice of the Supreme Court of Nigeria, in his autobiography Justice For All And By All (1994) at 148:

"Justice F O M Atake was one of the most efficient Chief Magistrates before whom I practised. He was......very quick in the uptake. His Judgements were well researched, well written and of high intellectual standard. Proceedings in his court were fast. To the best of my knowledge, he harassed no counsel or litigant....... Justice Atake was strong-willed and highly principled and held fast to what he believed in. He was blunt, not deceptive..."

However, when it came to the law of contempt of court, Franklin Atake found himself, somewhat to his surprise, at the centre of controversy. Some of his decisions in contempt of court cases brought him in full collision with the press and brought a renewed bout of national publicity. He sent the President of the Nigerian Bar Association, his cousin, Mr. Godwin Mogbeyi Boyo to prison for contempt of court when he thought he crossed the line. In 1969, he handed down what proved to be a controversial decision in the case reported as Boyo v The Attorney-General, Mid-West [1971] 1 All NLR, 342; [1971] NSCC, 333; See also, Re: GM Boyo v The State [1970] 1 All NLR, 111, [1970] NSCC, 87. Mr. Godwin Mogbeyi Boyo was arrested on a warrant issued by Franklin Atake. On an objection by Boyo's counsel that the court had no jurisdiction to hear the contempt proceedings, Atake ruled that he was indeed competent to try Boyo for contempt of court.

Naturally, as Godwin Boyo was the President of the Nigerian Bar Association, the decision received a great deal of publicity. The press generally supported Boyo – there were persistent calls in nearly all the Nigerian newspapers for Franklin Atake to resign from the Bench. This went on for a considerable period. Years. The Governor of Mid-Western Nigeria, Brigadier Samuel Ogbemudia, also involved himself in the matter. Having failed to convince the then Chief Justice of the Mid-Western Nigeria, The Honourable Mr. Justice Mason Begho, to refer the matter to the Federal Advisory Judicial Committee (a body responsible, inter alia, for taking disciplinary action against judges), the Governor wrote to the Head of State and Commander-In-Chief of the Armed Forces, General Yakubu Gowon, asking that some way be found to refer the matter to the committee. The Governor recommended that Franklin Atake be invited to resign or be removed from the Bench. General Gowon accordingly referred the matter to the Federal Advisory Judicial Committee. The chairman of the committee, the Chief Justice of Nigeria, Dr. Taslim Olawale Elias, called on Franklin Atake for his comments. After a very detailed consideration of the matter, the Federal Advisory Judicial Committee decided (in a decision endorsed by the Head of State) that:

"Although Mr. Justice Atake may have acted indiscreetly, it did not see that a case had been made out for his removal from the Bench or for any disciplinary action to be taken against him. If the then Chief Justice Sir Adetokunbo Ademola felt that disciplinary action was necessary, he would have so directed and raised the matter before the Committee at one of its subsequent meetings. The Committee deprecates the attitude of the press and Military Governors interfering in matters that are essentially judicial, and in calling for the removal of judges. It would be preferable to let the Chief Justice of a State ask that something be done if a judge of his court behaves in an unbecoming manner." (Excerpts from the minutes of the Advisory Judicial Committee meeting held in Lagos on 28 July 1972).

Franklin Atake was thus absolved and continued his judicial career in the Mid-Western Nigeria Judiciary.

== A Senator of The Federal Republic of Nigeria ==
Atake voluntarily retired from the Bench in 1977. He was persuaded to stand for the Senate of the Federal Republic of Nigeria and was elected with a landslide victory as Senator for Bendel Delta Senatorial District with 59,632 votes under the banner of the Unity Party of Nigeria (UPN) in 1979. It was a surprise to many that he went into politics as it was thought that he was not cut out for it. However, having found himself there, he decided to make the most of his time in the Senate. He combined a brilliant intellect with acute political instinct and fought most strenuously and tirelessly for what is right. In a short time in the Senate, the wider public admired him as a figure of integrity and courage. His parliamentary eloquence also led so many to admire him. He was nominated by the Unity Party of Nigeria (UPN) to be their candidate for the President of the Senate, the National Party of Nigeria (NPN) nominated Dr. Joseph Wayas. Atake entered fully into the spirit of the occasion hoping to win. The NPN had a very good majority in the Senate and had an accord with the Nigerian Peoples Party (NPP). Senators voted strictly on party lines and Dr. Joseph Wayas became the victorious President of the Senate winning by 52 votes to 42 votes. It was a disappointment to Franklin Atake that votes were cast strictly on party lines and not on a non-partisan basis and on merit. Be that as it may, he was not deterred from commenting on issues of national importance and in no time, he became an outstanding political figure. On the Senate floor, he gained a reputation for being a doughty fighter. He was a leading advocate and resolute fighter for the principle of derivation; the principle in which resources from states are to be shared in an equitable manner. As a Senator, Franklin Atake was the originator of the Resources Control Movement. Until his death, he advocated Resource Control being carried to its logical conclusion. The local governments concerned should get their share of the resources, especially the derivation of petroleum resources. He advocated for the establishment of 50% derivation, with 25% to the state government and 25% to the local governments. The balance can be retained by the Federal Government. Atake opposed most vehemently anything that did not conform to the principles and the rule of law. Two of such examples would suffice. First, when the Senate passed what was called the Allocation Of Revenue (Federation Account) Act 1981 and the then President, Shehu Shagari unconstitutionally signed it into law (as was eventually upheld in the Supreme Court – see Attorney-General, Bendel State v Attorney-General, Federation & Others [1982] 3 NCLR, 1,) he went to court challenging the purported law on the ground that it was unconstitutional, void and of no effect having regard to the provisions in sections 149(2) & (3) of the 1979 Constitution of the Federal Republic. Secondly, when the then Chief Judge of the Bendel State, the Hon. Justice Victor Ovie Whisky was nominated Chairman of the Federal Electoral Commission (FEDECO) and his nomination came before the Senate for ratification, the proceedings of the Senate show that it was Franklin Atake who opposed most strenuously the ratification on the floor of the Senate on the ground that Ovie-Whiskey, CJ was still a public officer (Chief Judge of Bendel State). Atake argued that Ovie-Whiskey had not first resigned or retired as Chief Judge of Bendel State in accordance with a provision in the 1979 Constitution and so any appointment as FEDECO Chairman would be null and void. Notwithstanding that objection, the Senate went ahead to ratify the nomination. In the end, Mr. Justice Victor Ovie Whisky was appointed Chairman of FEDECO. Franklin Atake, who was travelling abroad at the time, could not take up the constitutional issue in Court. However, another prominent Senator did. When the matter finally came up before the Supreme Court of Nigeria, it was decided that, that Senator had no locus standi to bring the action. Hence, the now famous and landmark decision of the Supreme Court in the case of Senator Abraham Adesanya v President of the Federal Republic of Nigeria; The Hon. Justice Victor Ovie-Whiskey [1981] NSCC, 146. Having served one term in the Senate, Atake did not stand for a second term. He therefore left the Senate in 1983.

== In retirement ==
He was named a Chief with the title Aboludero of Warri Kingdom by His Majesty Erejuwa II the paramount ruler of the Itsekiri and the Olu of Warri Kingdom in 1983. In retirement, Franklin Atake did not disappear from public life. He became a famous litigant on several issues some of which were personal and others pertaining to the rights of the people of the Niger Delta. Two cases of which he was a litigant set judicial precedents. In Justice F O M Atake v Chief Nelson Asigboro Afejuku [1994] 9 NWLR Part 368, 379, the Supreme Court of Nigeria for the first time in Nigerian Legal Jurisprudence decided that a Judicial Officer who has ceased to be one is entitled to conduct his case in person. That when he appears in person, he is not for that purpose, acting as a legal practitioner within the purview of the Constitution. Similarly, in Justice F O M Atake v Chief Mene-Afejuku [1996] 3 NWLR Part 437, 483. At issue was the Supreme Court decision in which Karibi-Whyte, JSC held that, section 340(2) of the Criminal Procedure Law, Cap. 32, Laws of Lagos State 1973 as amended prohibited the right to private prosecution with respect to all criminal offences. (See Akilu v Fawehinmi (no. 2) (1989) 2 NWLR, part 102, 122). That decision had prevented litigants from prosecuting privately criminal offences in Lagos State. However, Franklin Atake thought that the law had been wrongly construed and caused a private prosecution to be brought. In a landmark decision, the Court of Appeal held that the right to a private prosecution in Lagos State was only barred with respect to indictable offences and that the right is not prohibited with respect to non-indictable offences. That it is fair to imply Karibi-Whyte, JSC in his leading Judgement did not mean to exclude all offences but only indictable offences. He also continued to produce a stream of opinions on national issues particularly on derivation, and matters pertaining to the Itsekiri tribe and the Warri crisis. For example, he submitted an address to the "Judicial Commission of Inquiry into The Ethnic Conflicts Between Ijaws and Itsekiris In The Warri North, South and South-West Local Government Areas Of Delta State". He also appeared before the Commission in person. The commission had been set up inter alia, to find out the immediate and remote causes of the conflict between Ijaws and Itsekiris in the months of March to May 1997. Atake went before the commission to say and also published in some National newspapers that, the cause of the conflict was the false announcement by the Military Administrator of Delta State, Colonel J Dungs that Warri South Local Government Area had been created with headquarters at Ogbe Ijaw; an Ijaw settlement in Warri Division. Atake blamed the entire cause of the crisis at the door of Colonel Dungs and Dungs' "acts of gross illegality". Right to the very end, Franklin Atake remained a stalwart and vociferous defender of the Itsekiri people and the rights of the people of the Niger Delta. He was one of the strongest advocates of the principle of derivation in the country. It was very dear to his heart and as Senator of the Federal Republic, he moved several motions on the floor of Parliament for this principle to be adopted. Consequently, when the Supreme Court in what has become known as the On-shore/Off-Shore case (see, A-G, Federation v A-G, Abia State(No.2) [2002] 6 NWLR Part 764 at 542) in which that court decided that the seaward boundaries of Nigeria's littoral states, viz.: Lagos, Ogun, Ondo, Delta, Bayelsa, Rivers, Cross Rivers and Akwa Ibom for the purposes of calculating the amount of revenue derived from the natural resources of those states is the low watermark of the land surface of each of those states, Franklin Atake disagreed with the Court and caused his views in a well-articulated article to be published in some national newspapers.

== Personal life ==
He died in Lagos 1 March 2003 at the age of 76 of a heart-related disease. He married Victoria Arugha Patricia Atake (née Foss). They had several children, including Eyimofe Atake, a Senior Advocate of Nigeria and Adewale Atake also a Senior Advocate of Nigeria.
