= Awolowo v Shagari case =

1979 Nigerian Supreme Court case

Awolowo v. Shagari
- Court: Supreme Court of Nigeria Suit No: SC.62/1979
- Decided: 26 September 1979

Case history
- Related action

Court membership
- Judges sitting: Atanda Fatai Williams; Mohammed Bello; Kayode Eso; Mohammed Uwais; Andrews Otutu Obaseki; Ayo Gabriel Irikefe; Chike Idigbe

Case opinions
- Decision by: Kayode Eso
- Concurrence: Atanda Fatai Williams
- Dissent: Kayode Eso

Awolowo v. Shagari was a lawsuit between Chief Obafemi Awolowo and Alhaji Shehu Shagari in which Chief Obafemi Awolowo's petition challenged the declaration of Shehu Shagari as the president-elect following the 11 August 1979, presidential election.

== Summary Of Judgement ==
This is an Election petition in which the Court was called upon to interpret Section 34 A (i) (ii) of Electoral Decree No 73 of 1977. The Appellant (I.e) Awolowo contested the declaration of the first Respondent as President of the Federal Republic of Nigeria, arguing that Section 34 A(i)(c)(ii) of the Electoral Decree had not been satisfied (i.e., winning one quarter of the votes in two-thirds of all the states of the federation). The Election Tribunal dismissed the Appellant's claims, affirming the Election of the first Respondent. The Appellant appealed. This Court (Supreme Court) affirmed the decision of the tribunal and dismissed this appeal. The case was decided by the Supreme Court of Nigeria on 26 September 1979, and the presiding judge was Atanda Fatai Williams, while the only dissenting judge was Kayode Eso.
