= Permanent Voter's Card =

Voter identification card issued by Nigeria's INEC

A permanent voter's card.

The Permanent Voter's Card (PVC) is a voter identification card issued by Nigeria's Independent National Electoral Commission (INEC) to registered voters. It was introduced as part of Nigeria's biometric voter-registration reforms and replaced the Temporary Voter Card issued following voter registration beginning in 2011. Ahead of the 2015 general election, INEC produced PVCs for 68,833,476 persons on the biometric voter register.

Under the Electoral Act 2026, an intending voter is required to present at the polling unit where the voter is registered and provide a PVC. The voter's identity is then verified or authenticated using the Bimodal Voter Accreditation System (BVAS), or another technological device prescribed by INEC. The PVC therefore functions as part of the accreditation process but is distinct from the biometric authentication performed by BVAS.

== Development ==
Nigeria's PVC system developed from reforms to the voter register undertaken after the 2011 elections. The card was introduced as a machine-readable, chip-based identification document intended to work with biometric voter authentication. Academic research on Nigeria's election administration identifies the combination of the PVC and Smart Card Reader as one of the major technological reforms introduced before the 2015 elections.

The PVC replaced the Temporary Voter Card associated with the 2011 registration exercise. For the 2015 elections, INEC stated that it had produced permanent cards for 68.8 million citizens included in its biometric register at the time.

== Design and biometric data ==
The version of the PVC introduced for the 2015 elections incorporated security printing, personalisation, lamination and an embedded chip. INEC stated at the time that the chip contained biometric information associated with the registered voter, including fingerprints and a facial image, and that the card had been designed for an average lifespan of about ten years.

Originally, the PVC was read using INEC's Smart Card Reader, which was designed to check the card and authenticate the voter's fingerprint. The Smart Card Reader was first deployed nationwide during the 2015 general election. Subsequent electoral reforms replaced it with Bimodal Voter Accreditation System (BVAS), which permits voter authentication using fingerprint or facial recognition.

== Eligibility for Registration ==
To be eligible for a Permannent Viter's Card in Nigeria, a voter has to be a citizen of Nigeria and be at least 18 years old.
