= Ahmed Mu'azu =

Acting chairman of INEC

Air vice marshal Ahmed Mu'azu OON

Chairman of Independent National Electoral Commission
- Acting
- In office 9 November 2020 – 9 December 2020
- Preceded by: Mahmood Yakubu
- Succeeded by: Mahmood Yakubu

Personal details
- Born: Ahmed Tijani Mu'azu; 6 September 1957 (age 69) Gombe, Gombe State

Military service
- Allegiance: Nigeria
- Branch/service: Nigerian Air Force
- Years of service: 1979–2013
- Rank: Air vice marshal

Ahmed Tijani Mu'azu, OON, (born 6 September 1957), is a former acting chairman of Independent National Electoral Commission. He replaced Mahmood Yakubu on 9 November 2020 after his first tenure expired.

== Education and career ==
Mu'azu was born in Gombe, Gombe State. He had his education in Gombe State, Kaduna State and Borno State between 1964 and 1975. In June 1976, he joined the Nigerian Air Force where he had his basic military training at Nigerian Defence Academy till December 1979 and was commissioned pilot officer. From 1979 to 1991, he was deployed to air traffic control duties at the Murtala Muhammed International Airport and Mallam Aminu Kano International Airport. In 1988, Mu'azu did his junior command and staff course at Armed Forces Command and Staff College, Jaji. Between 1991 and 1992, he attended the senior command and staff course at Ghana Armed Forces Staff College, Teshie, Accra.

From 2003 to 2004, he was a member of National War College, Course 12 at the then National War College (now, National Defence College. In 2005, he received an MSc in strategic studies from University of Ibadan.

Mu’azu became an air vice marshal in 2007 and retired voluntarily in 2013. In 2016, he was appointed as a National Commissioner of Independent National Electoral Commission by the president of Nigeria, Muhammadu Buhari.

== Acting INEC chairman ==
On 9 November 2020, Mu'azu was appointed as the acting chairman of Independent National Electoral Commission to replace Mahmood Yakubu whose first tenure expired.
