= Joash Amupitan =

Nigerian academic

Chairman of Independent National Electoral Commission
- Incumbent
- Assumed office 9 October 2025
- Preceded by: Mahmood Yakubu; May Agbamuche-Mbu (acting)

Personal details
- Born: 25 April 1967 (age 59) Ayetoro Gbede, Ijumu, Kogi State, Nigeria
- Citizenship: Nigeria
- Education: University of Jos
- Occupation: Lawyer

Joash Ojo Amupitan (born 25 April 1967) is a Nigerian professor of law who serves as the chairman of the Independent National Electoral Commission, succeeding Mahmood Yakubu. He was nominated for the position by President Bola Tinubu on 9 October 2025 and confirmed by the Nigerian Senate on 16 October 2025. He became a Senior Advocate of Nigeria (SAN) in 2014.

As a legal professional and academic, his focus area cut across company law, law of evidence, corporate governance, and privatisation law. He succeeds Professor Mahmood Yakubu as the Chairman of Nigeria's Independent National Electoral Commission (INEC).

Regarding his nomination, Amupitan was described as an "apolitical" person by President Bola Tinubu in a statement posted by the presidential spokesman Bayo Onanuga.

== Early life and education ==
Amupitan was born on April 25, 1967, into the family of Mr and Mrs Amupitan in Ayetoro Gbede, Ijumu, Kogi State. His mother, Alice Ajigba Amupitan, was an educator and church leader in Kogi state.

He attended Kwara State Polytechnic, Ilorin, and obtained a national diploma (ND) certificate in 1984 before proceeding to the University of Jos where he earned an LL.B. degree in law. He was called to the Nigerian Bar in 1988. He later obtained an M.Sc. and a PhD degree in law from the University of Jos in 2007.

== Career ==
Amupitan began his academic career at the University of Jos (UNIJOS) in 1989 after his National Youth Service at the Bauchi State Publishing Corporation. At various capacities, he has held leadership roles, including Dean of the Faculty of Law (2008–2014), Head of the Department of Public Law (2006–2008), and chairman, Committee of Deans and Directors (2012–2014). He also serves as Pro-Chancellor and Chairman of the Governing Council of Joseph Ayo Babalola University, Osun State, and sits on the boards of several institutions, including the Nigerian Institute of Advanced Legal Studies and Integrated Dairies Limited, Vom, Plateau State.

=== Membership, board and governance roles ===
- Board Member, Integrated Dairies Limited, Vom, Plateau State.
- Member, Nigerian Institute of Advanced Legal Studies Governing Council.
- Member, Council of Legal Education (2008–2014).
- Former Board Member, Riss Oil Limited, Abuja (1996–2004).

=== Publications ===
- Legal Brief: Genocide in Nigeria, in Nigeria's Silent Slaughter: Genocide in Nigeria and the Implications for the International Community
- Addressing Nigerian Economic Challenges through the Instrumentality of the Law (2023)
- Corporate Governance: Models and Principles (2008)
- Documentary Evidence in Nigeria (2008)
- Evidence Law: Theory and Practice in Nigeria (2013)
- Principles of Company Law (2013)
- Introduction to the Law of Trust in Nigeria (2014)

== Personal life ==
He is married to Yemisi Amupitan and they have four children.
