= Eyimofe Atake =

Nigerian lawyer (born 1958)

Eyimofe Doyle Atake SAN
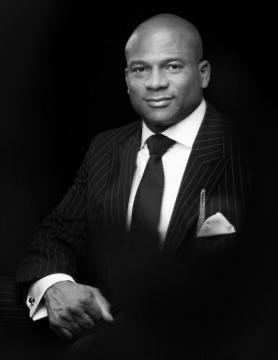
- Born: 20 February 1958 (age 68); Sapele, Western Region British Nigeria now, Sapele, Delta State, Nigeria
- Occupation: Lawyer
- Spouse: Dorothy Olufunmilayo Atake
- Parent(s): Honourable Justice FOM Atake; Victoria Arugha Patricia Atake (nee Foss)

Academic background
- Education: London School of Economics, Darwin College, Cambridge
- Thesis: Contempt in the Face of the Court and the Procedure for Committal
- Doctoral advisor: David Williams (British legal scholar)
- Website: eyimofeatake.com

Eyimofe Doyle Atake (born 20 February 1958) is a Nigerian lawyer. He was named a Senior Advocate of Nigeria in 1999.

== Early life ==
Atake was born in Sapele, a town in Western Region British Nigeria (now, Sapele, Delta State, Nigeria) to Honourable Justice FOM Atake, a Judge of the High Court of Mid-western Nigeria (1967–1977) and a Senator of the Federal Republic of Nigeria (1979–1982) and his wife, Victoria Arugha Patricia Atake (née Foss).

Atake attended St. Saviours School in Ikoyi, Lagos, while his father served as a Senior Magistrate in the British Colony of Lagos in the 1950s and early 1960s. He also attended a number of other schools across Nigeria as his father was occasionally transferred to work as a judicial officer in different parts of the country and his family moved along with him, the schools include Emotan Preparatory School, Benin, Our Lady's Preparatory School, Sapele, and Hussey Model School Warri. Atake was educated at an independent boarding school for boys Copford College, Copford, Colchester, England, where he became a School Prefect, House Captain, Athletics and Table Tennis Captain and played Soccer and Rugby for the school teams.

Atake attended the London School of Economics and Political Science and Darwin College, University of Cambridge where he earned a doctorate degree in law in 1987, under the supervision of David Williams (British legal scholar). His PhD thesis titled Contempt in the Face of the Court and the Procedure for Committal made comparisons between the legal systems of England and Wales, the United States of America, Canada, Australia, New Zealand, India and Nigeria. That work formed the basis for a book Contempt in the Face of the Court published in 1992.

Eyimofe Atake attended The Hague Academy of International Law (1980 and 1981) and studied International Law under the guidance of Rosalyn Higgins, Baroness Higgins, while at the London School of Economics and wrote an LL.M dissertation under her supervision - Is restitution an appropriate remedy for taking of foreign property in contemporary International Law?

== Career ==
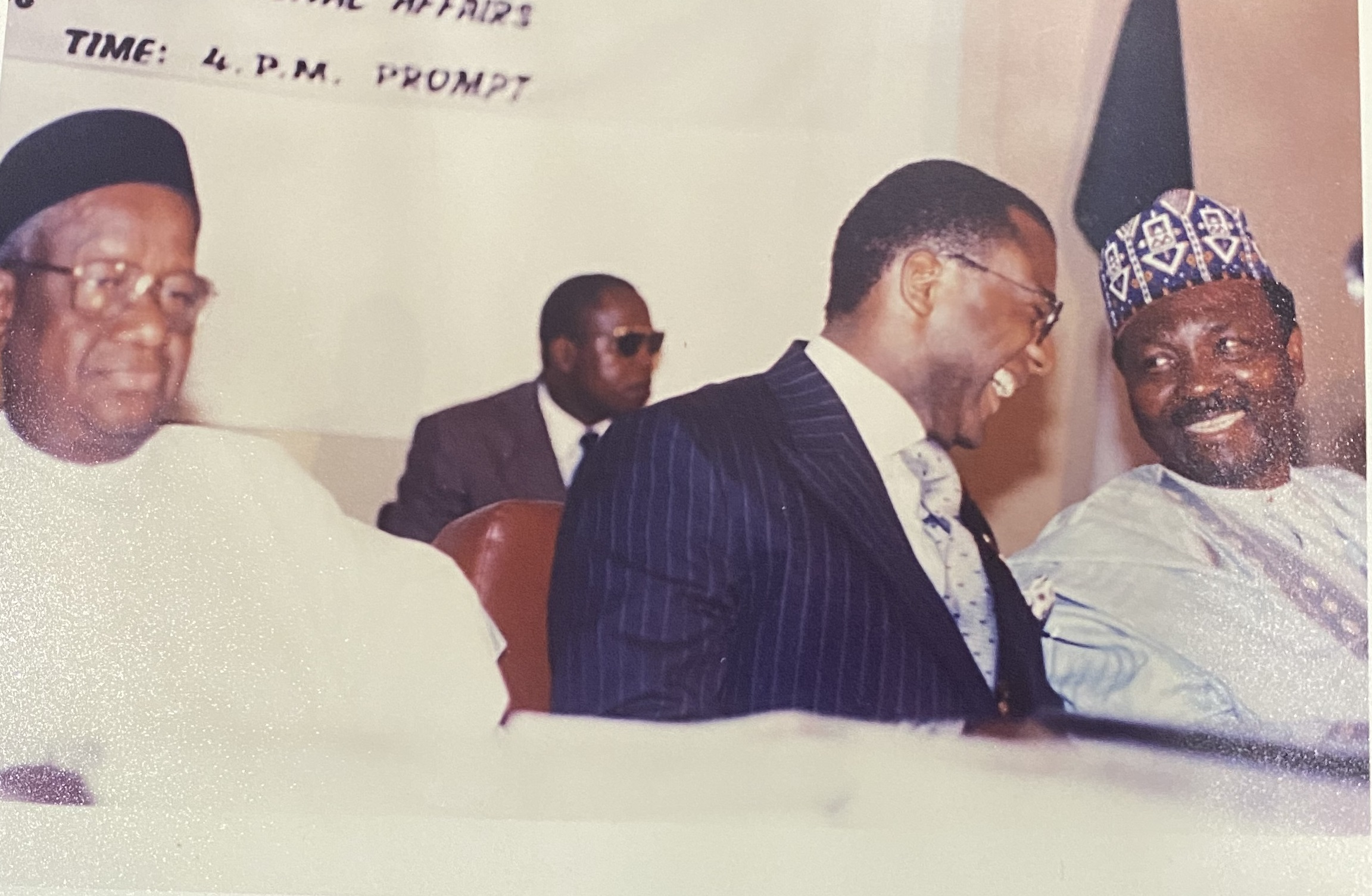
Chief Justice Mohammed Bello (jurist) Eyimofe Atake and Yakubu Gowon (former Head of State) in 1993 at the launch of Atake's book Contempt in the Face of the Court

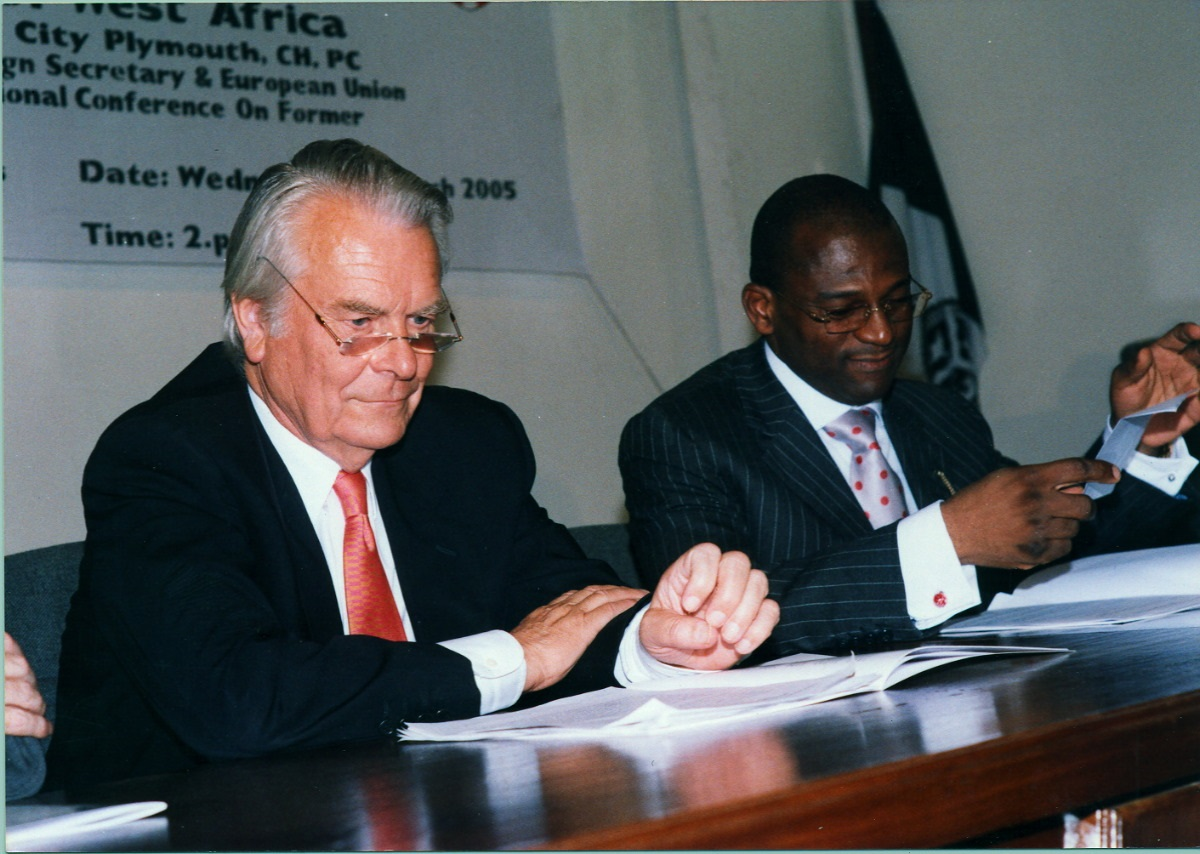
Lord Owen (former British Foreign Secretary) and Eyimofe Atake in 2005 at a Public Lecture “The Future of West Africa” in Lagos

Atake was admitted to the Nigerian Bar in July 1983. In 1987, he did his pupillage for one year with Chief G O K Ajayi, at law firm GOK Ajayi & Co. In 1988, he set up his law firm Eyimofe Atake & Co. Barristers and Solicitors specializing in Maritime Law, Oil and Gas, Arbitration and commercial litigation. In about 12 years of being in law practice and setting up of his Law Firm, he took Silk becoming a Senior Advocate of Nigeria (SAN) in 1999 at the age of 41.

Atake has represented clients in the areas of Maritime/Admiralty Law, Constitutional and Commercial Law in Nigerian courts of various levels. In 2009, Atake convinced a Judge in a trial involving American witnesses that the court be moved to New York in the United States to hear further proceedings as the American witnesses were too old and ill to travel to Nigeria for the trial.

In a 1997 case where Atake represented the defendants/Appellants, he convinced the Justices of the Supreme Court to rule that a case that has been discontinued and struck out, did not prevent a Court from making consequential orders, where it is established that, the Plaintiff who discontinued the case has abused the legal process by using the process of the court to gain unmerited advantages over the defendant, to the detriment of that Defendant. In 1994, Atake persuaded a full bench of seven Justices of the Supreme Court of Nigeria to decide that a judicial officer who has ceased to be one could appear for himself in person in a court of law rather than being represented by counsel and that the Constitution of the Federal Republic of Nigeria did not place such a bar on a judicial officer who has ceased to be one. Atake wrote on the Legal Aspects of Privatisation during the exercise in Nigeria in the 1990s. As a result of his extensive writings in the press and comments on television, he was invited to deliver and delivered the Public Lecture on the Legal Aspects of Privatisation and Commercialisation at the International Conference organized by the Technical Committee on Privatisation and Commercialisation (TCPC) in 1990. He served in the sub-committee of the Technical Committee on Privatisation and Commercialisation (TCPC) for the privatisation of the Nigerian Fish Company.

=== Athletics and fashion ===
Atake represented the University of Cambridge in Athletics against Oxford in all three years he spent in Cambridge, and he served as President of the Oxford and Cambridge Club of Nigeria between 2002 and 2006.

He has at various times been described as one of the best dressed men in Nigeria and one of the best dressed lawyers and a Nigerian worthy of note. He is known for his sense of style and has featured in several newspapers and magazines and won various professional and style awards. For several decades he has been well known in the social scene and circles.

== Personal life ==
He is married to Dorothy Atake (née Kuku). He has four Children, Eyitoritse, Timofe, Oritselaju and Amatoritsero.

== Honours ==
He was named a Chief with the title Tolugbogwa of Warri Kingdom on 22 August 2023 by His Royal Majesty, Ogiame Atuwatse III, CFR, the Olu of Warri.

== Publications ==
=== Selected writings ===
- Contempt in the Face of the Court (Book) (1992)
- Before We Privatise (1) The Guardian, Wednesday, 22 February 1989, 10.
- Before We Privatise (2), The Guardian, Thursday, 23 February 1989, 11.
- Privatisation and The Law (1), The Guardian, Tuesday, 13 September 1988, 11.
- Privatisation and The Law (11), The Guardian, Wednesday, 14 September 1988, 13.
- Privatisation, Commercialisation and Decree No. 25 of 1988, The Financial Post, 11 June 1989, 38.
- The Legal Aspects of the Implementation of the Privatisation and Commercialisation Programmes (Chapter) in H. R. Zayyad's Economic Democratisation (TCPC, Lagos, 1992)
- Between the Executive and The Legislature Excerpts from a paper delivered by Dr. Eyimofe Atake, SAN at a workshop on Public Accounts and Democracy organized by the Senate Committee on Public Accounts, THISDAY, The Sunday Newspaper, 12 March 2000, 38, 39.
- Contempt in The Face of The Court – Mike Okoye's Case THISDAY, Vol. 8, No. 2522, Tuesday, 19 March 2002, 30, 42, 43
- Supreme Court and the Allegation of Corruption, (Guest Columnist), THISDAY, Vol. 11, no. 3726, Tuesday, 5 July 2005, 51.
- (Guest Columnist) National Assembly Can Raise Budget Estimates (Back Page), THISDAY, Vol. 6, No. 1856, Monday, 22 May 2000, 56.
- Disqualification in Contempt Cases, SUNDAY TIMES, 25 March 1990, at 12–14.
- Attorney-General's Advice to the Inspector General of Police, Curious. Extraordinary ThisDay, Vol. 10, NO. 2201, Tuesday, 27 January 2004, 45, 46.
- Can These Men Re-Contest the Governorship THISDAY, Tuesday 9 October 2001.
- Taslim Elias: The Exit of a Genius, Sunday Times 25 August 1991, 27.
- T O Elias: An Appreciation, The Guardian, Wednesday, 4 September 1991.
- Elegy to a Judge and Senator (1) THISDAY, vol. 9, no. 2900, Tuesday, 1 April 2003, 41.
- Elegy to a Judge and Senator (2) THISDAY, vol. 9, no. 2907, Tuesday, 8 April 2003, 48.
- G.O.K Ajayi: An Appreciation ThisDay Tuesday 20 May 2014.
- 'Folake Solanke: First Female Silk @85, THISDAY, 11 April 2017, 14.
- Frank Odunayo Akinrele, SAN 1930-2018: An Appreciation, ThisDay 1 January 2019.
