= Gesila Khan =

Gesila Khan was a Resident Electoral Commissioner of the Nigerian Independent National Electoral Commission Cross River State Branch. She held the same position at the Delta State Branch from 2012 to 2014 and at the Rivers State Branch from 2014 to 2016. In 2017, she was arraigned on charges of corruption, pleading not guilty.

== Personal life ==
Khan is originally from Bayelsa State, in southern Nigeria. She is married.
