= PVC (disambiguation) =

PVC is polyvinyl chloride, a plastic.

PVC also may refer to:

== Science and technology ==
- Peripheral venous catheter, intravenous tube
- Permanent virtual circuit, in electronic networks
- Permanent Voter's Card, a voter identification card in Nigeria
- Pixel Visual Core, a programmable image processor used in mobile devices
- Premature ventricular contraction, an abnormal heartbeat
- PVC superphylum, a bacterial clade
- Photovoltaic cell, an electronic device that converts light to electricity

== Other uses ==
- Pro-vice-chancellor, a senior academic in a managerial role
- Param Vir Chakra, a military award in India
- Provincetown Municipal Airport (IATA airport code), US

== See also ==
- PCV (disambiguation)
