= G. O. K. Ajayi =

Nigerian lawyer (1931-2014)

- Born: Godwin Olusegun Kolawole Ajayi; 29 May 1931; Ogun State, Nigeria
- Died: 31 March 2014 (aged 82); Reddington Hospital Lagos
- Education: London School of Economics
- Occupations: Lawyer, Advocate

Chief Godwin Olusegun Kolawole Ajayi, SAN (29 May 1931 – 31 March 2014) popularly known by his initials G. O. K. Ajayi, was a prominent Nigerian lawyer.

== Early life ==
Ajayi was born on 29 May 1931, at Ijebu Ode, a city in Ogun State southwestern Nigeria. He had his elementary education at Ijebu Ode Nursery School and St Saviours' School in Lagos state before he attended CMS Grammar School where he obtained the Cambridge School Certificate in 1948. He went to the London School of Economics where he received a bachelor's degree in law.

== Law career ==
Ajayi was called to the English bar in 1955 and the Nigerian bar in 1957. He was elevated to the rank of Senior Advocate of Nigeria in 1978, along with Chief Kehinde Sofola, Remi Fani-Kayode and Obafemi Awolowo, the national leader of the defunct Unity Party of Nigeria.

He was the lawyer of the now-defunct Unity Party of Nigeria and Awolowo's solicitor in the Awolowo v. Shagari case on September 26, 1979, in which Chief Obafemi Awolowo's petition challenged the declaration of Shehu Shagari as the winner of the August 11, 1979, presidential election. The late Justice Kayode Eso, presided over the case.

He was Moshood Abiola's solicitor in the case of annulment of the June 12, 1993, presidential election.

Ajayi died on March 31, 2013, in the intensive care unit of Reddington Hospital in Lagos State.

His nephews include the actor O. T. Fagbenle, the film producer Luti Fagbenle and the music video producer Oladapo Fagbenle. A niece is the basketball player Temi Fagbenle.
