= Atanda Fatai Williams =

Chief Justice of Nigeria from 1979 to 1983

Chief Atanda Fatai Williams GCON SAN CFR CON

Chief Justice of Nigeria
- In office 1979–1983
- Preceded by: Darnley Arthur Alexander
- Succeeded by: George Sodeinde Sowemimo

Personal details
- Born: 22 October 1918
- Died: 10 April 2002 (aged 83)
- Party: Non-partisian

Chief Atanda Fatai Williams, GCON (22 October 1918 – 10 April 2002) was a Nigerian Jurist and Chief Justice of Nigeria from 1979 to 1983.

== Early life ==
Williams was born on 22 October 1918 in Lagos State, Nigeria, the son of Issa Williams. His father came from a trading family in Lagos and Williams was the grandson of Seidu Williams, a Lagos merchant. His father was an adherent of the Ahmadiyya Movement in Islam.

Williams attended an Ahmadiyya primary school, near Aroloya, Lagos and proceeded to Methodist Boys' High School, Lagos where he obtained the West Africa School Certificate. During his secondary school days, he joined a social club called the Green Triangle and became friends with Remi Fani-Kayode, whose father was a lawyer and Ibikunle Akitoye. The group sometimes went to the court in Tinubu square to watch the proceedings.

After earning his WASC certificate, he joined the Civil Service as a third class clerk in the Medical Department. During World War II, he applied and got admission to Trinity Hall, Cambridge. His journey to England was through a chartered Elder Dempster Ship, MV Stentor, while in the Mid-Atlantic, the ship was torpedoed but all Nigerian passengers survived using life boats. He studied law at University of Cambridge and Middle Temple where he trained as a legal practitioner in 1948.

== Law career ==
Upon returning from London, he worked briefly with the law chambers of Remi Fani-Kayode and Rotimi Williams before establishing his own law firm in 1948. He joined the Lagos State Judiciary as Crown Counsel in 1950. In 1955, a decision was made whereby regional governments were allowed to create the position of Chief Justice and to enact statutory laws. Subsequently, a commission under the former Chief Justice, John Verity was created to review statute of laws of the region. Williams applied for the position of deputy commissioner of the review body. He was later appointed Deputy Commissioner for Law Revision, Western Nigeria, a position he held until he was elected as Constitutional Adviser, Western Nigerian Delegation to the London Constitutional Conference of 1957, after a year, he became the Chief Registrar for the High Court of Western Nigeria.

In 1960, he became a judge in the Western region, after a year, he was posted to the Benin Judicial Division as judge. The posting was met with coldness from some residents of Benin who had wanted a Mid-Western State and preferably a judge from the Benin division. In March 1963, he was posted to the Ondo Judicial Division and in 1967, he was appointed to the bench of the Supreme Court of Nigeria as Justice. He served at various judicial committees between 1971 and 1979.

In 1979, he became a member of the Nigerian Body of Benchers, the same year he was appointed as the Chief Justice of Nigeria to succeed Sir Darnley Alexander.

=== Chief Justice ===
Prior to his appointment, Williams was the most senior judge in the Supreme Court with the exclusion of judges such as Udo Udoma who had taken appointments outside of Nigeria. However, the previous three Chief Justices, Adetokunbo Ademola, Taslim Elias and Darnley Alexander, were not the most senior judges of the court prior to there appointments. The selection of Williams in 1979 began a tradition in which the most senior judge of the Supreme Court is selected as Chief Justice. Williams presided over the Awolowo v. Shagari case in which Chief Obafemi Awolowo's petition challenged the declaration of Shehu Shagari as the president elect of the 11 August 1979 presidential election. He ruled that Shehu Shagari won two-thirds of the total votes cast, having polled a total votes of 16.8 million with 11.9 million votes ahead of Obafemi Awolowo who polled a total votes of 4.9 million.

In Abraham Adesanya vs the Vice-President of Nigeria, the court delved into the question of Locus standi setting a judgement that is criticised by many public interest lawyers partly because the judgement set a precedent to deny access to courts by litigants unless they could show a personal interest in respect of their case. In recognition of his contributions to the legal professions, he was conferred with numerous awards and National honours such CFR, CON, GCON.

== Personal life ==
Williams was married in London in 1948 to Ms Irene Fatayi-Williams (née Lofts). They have three sons: Babatunde, Alan and Oladele. One of his grandchildren (Anthony Fatayi-Williams) was killed in the 7 July 2005 London bombings.
