= Darnley Alexander =

Chief Justice of Nigeria from 1975 to 1979

Sir Darnley Alexander GCON QC CBE SAN

Chief Justice of Nigeria
- In office 1975–1979
- Preceded by: Taslim Olawale Elias
- Succeeded by: Atanda Fatai Williams

Personal details
- Born: 28 January 1920 Castries, Saint Lucia
- Died: 10 February 1989 (aged 69) Paris, France
- Party: Non-Partisan

Sir Darnley Arthur Alexander, QC, CBE, GCON, SAN (28 January 1920 – 10 February 1989) was a Nigerian jurist and Chief Justice of Nigeria from 1975 to 1979.

== Biography ==
Alexander was born in Castries, Saint Lucia on 28 January 1920. He attended the University of London and obtained a Bachelor of Law degree in 1942. He served as a crown counsel and legal draftsman in Jamaica and as Turks and Caicos Islands magistrate. He came to Nigeria in 1957 on the invitation of the premier of the Western Region, Obafemi Awolowo who had appealed to the Colonial Office in London to help source a legal draftsman; Alexander then served the region in various capacities. He was Legal Draftsman, Western Region, Nigeria from 1957 to 1969 and was acting Director of Public Prosecutions in 1958.

In 1960, he was appointed the Solicitor General and Permanent Secretary of the regional Ministry of Justice and in 1963, he was made Queen's Counsel. In 1964, he was appointed a judge in the Lagos High Court and later in 1969, he was appointed Chief Justice of the South Eastern State now Cross River and Akwa Ibom states. He was appointed Chief Justice in 1975 over senior members of the Court. As a judge, he was appointed by Dennis Osadebay to serve as the commissioner of enquiry into the Owegbe secret cult. He was also chairman of the Tribunal of Inquiry into Examination Leakages.

In the 1974 Birthday Honours, he was knighted, having previously been appointed CBE.
