= INEC Result Viewing Portal =

Online election-results platform

- Developer: Independent National Electoral Commission
- Release: August 2020
- Operating system: Web-based
- Platform: Web
- Type: Election results viewing platform
- Website: irev.inecnigeria.org

The INEC Result Viewing Portal (IReV) is an online election-results platform operated by Nigeria's Independent National Electoral Commission (INEC) for the public viewing of polling-unit result records. It was introduced in 2020 as part of reforms to increase public access to polling-unit results and has subsequently been used in Nigerian off-cycle and general elections. IReV is distinct from the Bimodal Voter Accreditation System (BVAS). BVAS is used at polling units for biometric voter accreditation and for aspects of election-results management, while IReV is the online platform through which transmitted polling-unit result records can be viewed. IReV is also distinct from the legal process of collation and declaration of election winners.

== History ==
IReV was first introduced by the INEC during the Nasarawa Central State Constituency bye-election in August 2020. The system was designed to make electronic copies of polling-unit result sheets available for public viewing after voting and counting at the polling unit. Its use expanded through subsequent bye-elections, area council and governorship elections. By October 2022, INEC reported that IReV had been deployed in 105 elections involving more than 16 million registered voters.

== Operation ==
During voter accreditation, BVAS compares a voter's biometric characteristics with the data associated with the voter in the system. Fingerprint recognition may be used for authentication and, where required, facial recognition provides an alternative biometric method. INEC's 2021 implementation plan provided that a voter who could not be authenticated through either method would not be accredited to vote which bring about the replacement with card reader.

The system also records the number of voters accredited at a polling unit. This figure is relevant to the detection of over-voting because Nigerian electoral law provides consequences where votes cast exceed the number of accredited voters. Under section 51 of the Electoral Act 2026, a result may be cancelled where the number of votes cast at a polling unit exceeds the number of accredited voters at that unit. BVAS does not itself replace the paper-ballot voting and counting process. Under the Electoral Act 2026, voting is conducted by open secret ballot; after counting, the presiding officer records the votes scored by candidates on the prescribed form.

== Challenges ==
The challenge with the Irev was experienced during the 2023 elections INEC spokesperson,Festus Okoye said the system experienced some glitches during the upload of the presidential election results. Although that has drawn criticism about the functionality of the IRev INEC maintains that it will be deployed in the 2027 elections.
