= Amina Zakari =

Acting Chairman of the Independent National Electoral Commission

Chairman of Independent National Electoral Commission
- Acting
- In office 30 July 2015 – 9 November 2015
- Preceded by: Attahiru Jega
- Succeeded by: Mahmood Yakubu

Personal details
- Born: 23 June 1960 (age 66)

Amina Bala Zakari (née Husaini Adamu) (born 23 June 1960) was the former Acting Chairman of the Independent National Electoral Commission (INEC), the Nigerian electoral body. Her appointment took effect from the directive of the President Muhammadu Buhari following the expiration of the tenure of her predecessor, Attahiru Jega on 30 July 2015.

Zakari was the first woman to be appointed to the position of the leadership of INEC.

== Early life and education ==
Zakari is a princess of the Jigawa State. She was born on 23 June 1960 to the late Emir of Kazaure, Hussaini Adamu. Zakari completed her elementary education at Shekara Girls Primary School, Kano in 1971 and had her secondary education at Queens College, Lagos. She holds a Bachelor of Science degree in Pharmacy with Second Class Upper (Best Graduating Student) in 1980 from Ahmadu Bello University, Zaria.

Other qualifications include the following at various times: Certificate in Managing Drugs Supply for Primary Health Care from MHS Amsterdam, Netherlands, Certificate in Project Management, Certificate in Senior Management from Crown Agents London, United Kingdom and Certificate in Business Management from Harvard Business School, Cambridge, Massachusetts, United States.

== Personal life and career ==
Zakari is a widow; raising five children on her own since the loss of her husband in December 2000. Her late husband was Bala Zakari Kazaure (Santurakin Kazaure) a career banker and economist. He was an executive at Union Bank PLC at the time of his death and prior to that had held many positions at United Bank of Africa.

She had her National Youth Service Programme at the then Federal University of Technology, Bauchi between 1981 and 1982, where she set up a Pharmacy and Drug Store Dispensary as her service year project. She began her professional career at the Ahmadu Bello University Teaching Hospital, Kaduna as a Senior Pharmacist in 1984.

She was at CVS Pharmacy Hartsdale, New York, United States between 1993 and 1994 as an Intern Pharmacist and returned to Nigeria to join the Consolidated Health Services, Abakpa, Kaduna, where she became the Chief Pharmacist/Consultant from 1996 to 1997.

Zakari worked with the defunct Afri-Project Consortium, Abuja from 1994 to 1999 including roles as Senior Consultant/Chief Pharmacist working on PTF-funded health projects across Nigeria. Zakari led the revamp of the national network of Drug Revolving Fund (DRF). She also helped the FCT Drug Revolving Fund grow from ₦80 million to ₦300 million. Her monitoring background afforded an opportunity to enforce ethical practice in FCT private hospitals through active registration and inspection.

Zakari served as Special Assistant to the President from 2004 to 2007 posted to the Federal Capital Territory Administration (FCTA) working at various times as Secretary, Health and Human Services; Secretary, Social Development and Acting Secretary, Agriculture and Rural Development.

Her career as a pharmacist consultant, saw her working with the National AIDS and STDs Control Program (NASCP), Federal Ministry of Health 2002, Project Director for National Primary Health care Development Agency in 2003, Project Coordinator for FCT Federation of Muslim Women's Organization (FOMWAN) 2003, National Consultant, National Agency for Food and Drugs Administration and Control (NAFDAC) 2004, Lead Consultant/ Project Manager, Songhai Medical Centre Limited 2008, Consultant, Complete Medicare Limited and Accessible Managed Care Limited 2008 and Consultant, Millennium Development Goal Office 2008.

Zakari is a Registered Pharmacist and Member, Pharmaceutical Society of Nigeria as well as member of Nigeria Institute of Management (NIM).

Her hobbies include reading, crafts and traveling.

== INEC nomination and chairmanship ==
In 2011, Zakari was appointed as one of the National Electoral Commissioners at INEC by former President Goodluck Jonathan. Her mandate at INEC includes political parties' supervision via the Political Parties Monitoring Committee. Zakari also chaired the Inter-Party Advisory Council (IPAC) with responsibility for party system consolidation. Until her appointment as Acting Chairman, Zakari was chairman of the INEC Planning Monitoring and Strategy Committee effective November 2014.

Zakari was appointed acting chairman of INEC on 30 June 2015 following the expiration of the tenure of Attahiru Jega.

== Claims Of Being Related To President Buhari ==
On 27 July 2015, the Nigerian Tribune claimed that President Buhari was related to Zakari.

That claim was widely reported in the Nigerian media as a sign of nepotism by Buhari. The basis of the claim was an interview with a supporter of then president Jonathan, Alhaji Tanko Yakassai stated:

I know that the woman from her childhood. Her father worked with me as my Permanent Secretary before later he became the Emir of Kazaure. We maintained a cordial relationship until he passed on. However, the relationship between him and Buhari is something that I know of. Anybody around during that time also can confirm this. He (the late Emir) married the senior sister to Buhari and he (Buhari) started his childhood in the late emir's house. The mother of this woman (Zakari) was either the first or second wife. Aside from that, Buhari stayed with him for sometime in Kazaure. I know that the relationship is true.

However, on 8 September 2015, in another interview on Channels TV and published by The Mail Express, Yakassai denied criticizing the appointment of Zakari or about her relations with Buhari and that his actual words were manipulated by certain parties.

Yakassai stated that he was responding to a reporter if Zakari was related to Buhari, which Yakassai admitted was not related.

Somebody added something because I did not criticize her or her appointment. She is my daughter and a friend to her father was at one time my permanent secretary. Her mother is a friend to my senior wife. She is a friend to some of my children. I see no reason why I should criticize her.

Yakasai further stated that Zakari's "neutrality should not be contested on the grounds of familiarity with the president because she is entitled to the post as a Nigerian and a qualified professional."
