= George Sodeinde Sowemimo =

Chief Justice of Nigeria from 1983 to 1985

George Sodeinde Sowemimo GCON SAN CON

Chief Justice of Nigeria
- In office 1983–1985
- Preceded by: Atanda Fatai Williams
- Succeeded by: Ayo Gabriel Irikefe

Personal details
- Born: 8 November 1920
- Died: 29 November 1997 (aged 77)
- Party: Non partisian

Chief George Sodeinde Sowemimo, GCON (8 November 1920 – 29 November 1997) was a Nigerian jurist and chief justice of Nigeria from 1983 to 1985. Prior to becoming a Supreme Court judge, Sowemimo is remembered as the judge in the treasonable felony charge of the State v Omisade and others.

== Law career ==
Sowemimo was born in Zaria on 8 November 1920, the son of Sofoluwe and Rebecca Sowemimo. He attended Holy Trinity School, Kano and then proceeded to C.M.S. Grammar School, Lagos. He worked briefly with the Nigerian Railway Corporation from 1941 to 1944. He received a bachelor's degree in law from the University of Bristol in 1948 and also trained at Middle Temple for one year before he returned to Nigeria to set up his own law firm. He was appointed a magistrate in 1951 and later became a Chief Magistrate in 1956, he was elevated to the position of judge in the High Court of Lagos in 1961. In 1972, he was appointed a justice of the Nigerian Supreme Court. After several years of services in the Nigerian Judiciary, he was appointed Chief Justice of Nigeria in 1983 to succeed the late Justice Atanda Fatai Williams. Sowemimo retired in 1985 having attained the statutory retirement age of 65. He gave the verdict of the Treason-able Felony trial of Chief Obafemi Awolowo and twenty-six of his associates.
