= Bimodal Voter Accreditation System =

Electronic biometric voter-accreditation and election-results management system

- A Bimodal Voter Accreditation System (BVAS) device used in Nigerian elections
- Developer: Independent National Electoral Commission (INEC)
- Type: Biometric voter accreditation and result transmission device
- Released: September 2021
- Operating system: Android
- Connectivity: Cellular (4G/3G), Wi-Fi, offline mode
- Power: Rechargeable lithium-ion battery, solar panel compatibility
- Predecessor: Smart Card Reader (SCR), Z-Pad
- Related: INEC Result Viewing Portal (IReV)
- Website: inecnigeria.org

The Bimodal Voter Accreditation System (BVAS) is an electronic biometric voter-accreditation and election-results management system used by Nigeria's Independent National Electoral Commission (INEC). The system authenticates registered voters at polling units using fingerprint or facial recognition and records the number of voters successfully accredited. BVAS is also used in the polling-unit results process, including the capture and upload of result records to INEC Result Viewing Portal (IReV).

INEC introduced BVAS after phasing out Smart Card Reader and Z-Pad systems. The system was piloted in the Isoko South I State Constituency bye-election in Delta State in September 2021 and was subsequently deployed in the November 2021 Anambra State gubernatorial election, which was its first use in a major election. It was used in further off-cycle and local elections during 2022 before being deployed nationwide for the first time in the 2023 Nigerian general election.

The Electoral Act 2022 provided statutory backing for the use of technological devices in voter accreditation without naming BVAS specifically. The Electoral Act 2026, which repealed the 2022 Act, expressly provides in section 47 for the use of BVAS or another technological device prescribed by INEC for voter accreditation.

== Background and development ==
Before the introduction of BVAS, INEC used the Smart Card Reader (SCR) for electronic voter accreditation. It also developed the Z-Pad, which was used for functions including the uploading of polling-unit results to the IReV portal. INEC attempted to add facial biometric authentication to the accreditation process through a Z-Pad pilot during the Nasarawa Central State Constituency bye-election in August 2020, but the commission said the trial did not meet its expectations and suspended the proposed use while further development continued.

According to INEC, the functionality of the Z-Pad was later integrated with the device being used for voter enrolment. In September 2021, INEC announced that the device would also be used on election day as the Bimodal Voter Accreditation System, combining fingerprint and facial biometric authentication and taking over functions previously associated with the Smart Card Reader and Z-Pad.

The European Union Election Observation Mission's report on the 2023 Nigerian elections described BVAS as an in-house INEC technology whose development had begun in 2021 for voter-registration purposes before its subsequent adaptation and use in off-cycle and bye-elections.

== Operation ==
During voter accreditation, BVAS compares a voter's biometric characteristics with the data associated with the voter in the system. Fingerprint recognition may be used for authentication and, where required, facial recognition provides an alternative biometric method. INEC's 2021 implementation plan provided that a voter who could not be authenticated through either method would not be accredited to vote.

The system also records the number of voters accredited at a polling unit. This figure is relevant to the detection of over-voting because Nigerian electoral law provides consequences where votes cast exceed the number of accredited voters. Under section 51 of the Electoral Act 2026, a result may be cancelled where the number of votes cast at a polling unit exceeds the number of accredited voters at that unit. BVAS does not itself replace the paper-ballot voting and counting process. Under the Electoral Act 2026, voting is conducted by open secret ballot; after counting, the presiding officer records the votes scored by candidates on the prescribed form.

== Deployment History ==
2021

- BVAS was first deployed in Delta State for the Isoko South Constituency 1 bye-election on September, 2021.
- The Anambra State Governorship election on November 6, 2021.

2022

- Federal Capital Territory (FCT) Area Council Election on February 12th, 2022
- Ekiti state Governorship Election on June 18th, 2022.
- Osun state Governorship Election on July 16th, 2022
