= PCV =

PCV may refer to:

== Biology and medicine ==
- Packed cell volume, a clinical test
- Palm Creek virus, a virus
- Polycythemia vera, a disease
- Polypoidal choroidal vasculopathy, an eye disease
- Procarbazine/CCNU/vincristine, a chemotherapy regimen for brain tumors
- Pneumococcal conjugate vaccine
- Porcine circovirus, a virus
- Plasma cell variant of Castleman disease
- Penicillin V, a type of antibiotic

== Transportation ==
- Propelling Control Vehicle, British railway coach for carrying mail
- Positive crankcase ventilation, of an internal combustion engine

== Organisations ==
- Presbyterian Church of Victoria, Australia
- Presbyterian Church of Vanuatu
- Communist Party of Venezuela (Partido Comunista de Venezuela), a communist party in Venezuela

== Other uses ==
- Product category volume, weighted measure of distribution based on store sales within the product category
- Police Community Volunteer, UK
- Peace Corps Volunteer, of the Peace Corps

== See also ==
- PVC (disambiguation)
