= United Nations Security Council Resolution 708 =

UN Security Council Resolution 708
- International Court of Justice
- Date: 28 August 1991
- Meeting no.: 3,005
- Code: S/RES/708 (Document)
- Subject: International Court of Justice
- Voting summary: 15 voted for; None voted against; None abstained
- Result: Adopted

Security Council composition
- Permanent members: China; France; Soviet Union; United Kingdom; United States
- Non-permanent members: Austria; Belgium; Côte d'Ivoire; Cuba; Ecuador; India; Romania; Yemen; Zaire; Zimbabwe

United Nations Security Council resolution 708, adopted unanimously on 28 August 1991, after noting the death of International Court of Justice (ICJ) President Taslim Olawale Elias on 14 August 1991, the council decided that elections to the vacancy on the ICJ would take place on 5 December 1991 at the Security Council and at the General Assembly's 46th session.

Elias was a member of the court since 1976, and was its vice-president between 1979 and 1981 and its president from 1981 to 1985. His term of office was due to expire in February 1994.

== See also ==
- Judges of the International Court of Justice
- List of United Nations Security Council Resolutions 701 to 800 (1991–1993)
