= Attahiru Jega =

Nigerian academic (born 1957)

Attahiru Jega CON
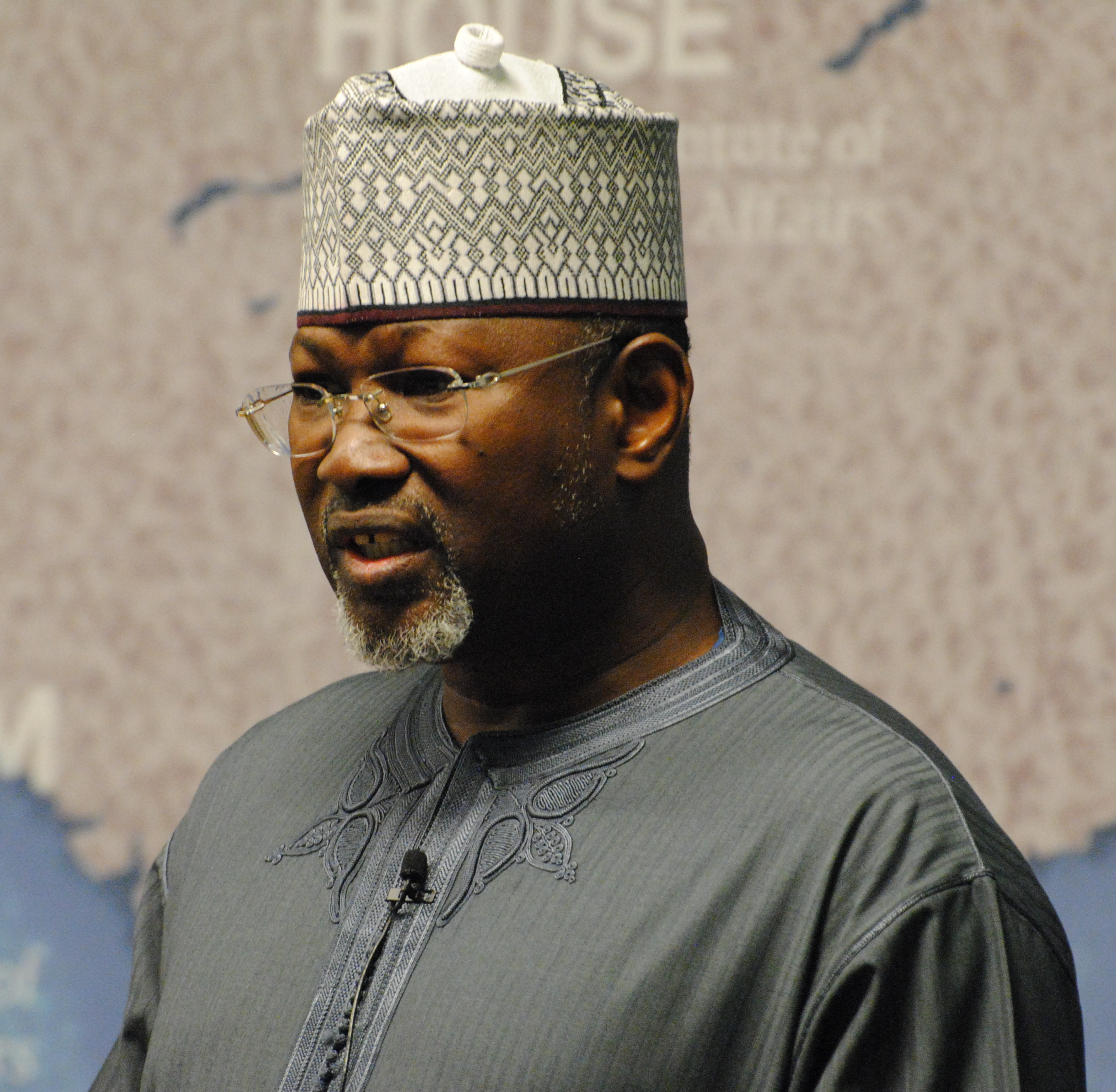
- Jega speaking at Chatham House, March 2016

4th chairman of the Independent National Electoral Commission
- In office 8 June 2010 – 31 June 2015
- Preceded by: Maurice Iwu
- Succeeded by: Amina Zakari

Personal details
- Born: Attahiru Muhammadu Jega; 11 January 1957 (age 69) Jega, Northern Region, British Nigeria (now in Kebbi State, Nigeria)
- Occupation: Academic; professor

Attahiru Muhammadu Jega CON (born 11 January 1957) is a Nigerian academic and former vice-chancellor of Bayero University, Kano. On 8 June 2010, he was nominated by then President Goodluck Jonathan as the new chairman of the Independent National Electoral Commission (INEC), subject to Senate confirmation, as a replacement for Professor Maurice Iwu, who was sacked two months earlier. Jega's tenure came to an end on 30 June 2015, handing over his position to Amina Zakari, according to a directive by president Muhammadu Buhari.

In 2025, he was appointed Special Adviser to President Bola Tinubu on Livestock Reforms.

== Early life and academic career ==
Jega was born on 11 January 1957 in Jega, Northern Region, Nigeria. He attended Sabon Gari Town Primary School, Jega, between 1963 and 1969, and proceeded to Government Secondary School, Birnin Kebbi, and then was admitted into Ahmadu Bello University Zaria's Bayero University College, Kano in 1974, graduating in 1979 with a Second Class Upper Division BSc degree in Political science. He worked as a teaching assistant at Bayero University, then won a fellowship at Northwestern University, Evanston, Illinois in the United States (1981–1984) where he earned a PhD in political sciences. He returned to the Political Science Department Bayero University in 1984 as a lecturer.

Other appointments included visiting senior research fellow at the Nigerian Institute of International Affairs, Lagos (March 1992 – March 1993), visiting research fellow, Department of Political Science, Stockholm University, Sweden (1994), deputy vice-chancellor (academic), Bayero University (1995–1996) and director, Centre for Democratic Research and Training, Bayero University (2000–2004). Jega was appointed vice-chancellor of Bayero University in 2005. He is currently a member of the International Elections Advisory Council.

== Political Activity ==
Jega is a former president of the Academic Staff Union of Universities (ASUU) and was an opponent of the Babangida military government in the early 1990s. Politically leaning towards the left as ASUU President, he was closely associated with the Nigeria Labour Congress (NLC), and continued that connection throughout his career. On 29 April 2010, he was invited as a guest lecturer for the NLC May Day celebration where he presented a paper on 50 Years of Nationhood: Challenges of Good Democratic Governance, Credible Election and the Working Class. He is widely seen as an astute intellectual with a strong sense of ethics and morality.

Jega was appointed a member of the Justice Mohammed Uwais Electoral Reform Committee, which submitted a report on 11 December 2008 with recommendations that included establishing commissions to deal with electoral offences, constituency delimitation and political parties registration and regulation. The committee also recommended proportional representation and that the INEC head should be appointed by the judiciary rather than the president.

== INEC chairmanship ==
Jega's nomination as INEC chairman was approved at a meeting of the National Council of States called by President Jonathan and attended by former heads of state Yakubu Gowon, Muhammadu Buhari, Ibrahim Babangida, Abdulsalami Abubakar, Ernest Shonekan, Olusegun Obasanjo and Shehu Shagari. The Senate President David Mark, Speaker of the House of Representatives Oladimeji Bankole, and most of the state Governors were also in attendance. Unanimous approval by the council of the nominee for this critical appointment avoided controversy about whether or not the president should appoint the chairman of the INEC. Reactions to the announcement from a broad spectrum of political leaders and organisations were positive, although some voiced concern that it could be too late to implement real reforms before the 2011 elections.

During the campaigning for the 2015 Nigerian general election, Attahiru Jega "faced fierce criticism from both the opposition and the ruling party." Nonetheless, a 23 March 2015 article in Vanguard asserted that "most experts believe Jega will seek to declare an accurate result as quickly as possible, regardless of any political interference he may face."

On 28 March 2015, under his leadership, elections were conducted in what Nigerians and the world see as free, fair, and credible, which declared the APC presidential candidate, General Muhammadu Buhari as the winner, defeating the incumbent president, Goodluck Jonathan.

== "Project Rescue Nigeria" ==
In 2021, ahead of the 2023 Nigerian general elections, Jega teamed with some other political stakeholders and floated a political movement he called the Rescue Nigeria Project (RNP).

== Honour ==
On 3 April 2023, the Kano State Executive Council appointed Jega Pro Chancellor and Chairman Governing Council of Sa’adatu Rimi University of Education (SRCOE), in Kumbotso, Kano State. On 28 October 2025, the Nigerian Institute of Animal Science awarded Professor Attahiru Muhammadu Jega an honorary Fellow Member

== Appointment ==
On 8 March 2025, President Bola Tinubu appointed Prof. Attahiru Jega, former Chairman of the Independent National Electoral Commission (INEC), as the Special Adviser and Coordinator of the Presidential Livestock Reform Initiative.

== Bibliography ==
- Attahiru Jega, ed. (2000). Identity transformation and identity politics under structural adjustment in Nigeria. Nordic Africa Institute. p. 235. ISBN 91-7106-456-7.
- Attahiru Jega & Haruna Wakili (2002). The poverty eradication programme in Nigeria: problems and prospects. Centre for Democratic Research and Training, Mambayya House, Bayero University. p. 191. ISBN 978-2035-27-0.
- Attahiru Jega; Haruna Wakili; Mustapha Ahmad (2002). selected papers of the National Conference on "Democracy and democratisation in Nigeria: an Assessment of the Period 1999 to 2001,". Centre for Democratic Research and Training, Mambayya House. p. 218. ISBN 978-2035-86-6.
- Attahiru Jega (2007). Democracy, good governance and development in Nigeria: critical essays. Spectrum Books Limited. p. 326. ISBN 978-978-029-784-8.
