= Oluwakemi Pinheiro =

Nigerian lawyer

- Born: Oluwakemi Pinheiro
- Education: University of Benin (Nigeria)
- Occupation: Nigerian lawyer
- Organization: Economic and Financial Crimes Commission

Oluwakemi Pinheiro is a Nigerian lawyer and legal academic who serves as Chairman of the Governing Council of Kaduna Polytechnic.

== Early life and education ==
Pinheiro obtained a Bachelor of Laws degree from the University of Benin, Edo State, in July 1986. He proceeded to the Nigerian Law School and was called to the Nigerian Bar in October 1987.

== Career ==
He works as a prosecutor under the authority of the Attorney General of the Federation and the Economic and Financial Crimes Commission (EFCC). He handled election cases for the Independent National Electoral Commission (INEC) during the 2023 Nigerian general election.

== Awards and recognition ==
Pinheiro was awarded the rank of Senior Advocate of Nigeria (SAN) in 2006. In 2020, he was appointed Chairman of the Lagos State Law Reform Commission by Governor Babajide Sanwo-Olu. In 2023, he was conferred with the national honor of Officer of the Order of the Federal Republic (OFR). In June 2024, he was appointed Chairman of the Governing Council of Kaduna Polytechnic. He is a Fellow of the Chartered Institute of Arbitrators (FCIArb).
