= May Agbamuche-Mbu =

Nigerian lawyer and electoral official

Acting National Chairperson, Independent National Electoral Commission
- In office 7 October 2025 – 9 October 2025
- Preceded by: Mahmood Yakubu
- Succeeded by: Joash Amupitan

National Commissioner, INEC
- In office 2016–2025
- Constituency: Delta State

Personal details
- Born: Kano, Nigeria
- Education: University of Ife (LL.B.), Queen Mary and Westfield College, London (LL.M.)
- Occupation: Lawyer
- Profession: Solicitor, Arbitrator
- Committees: Legal Services, Clearance and Complaints Committee (LSCCC)

May Agbamuche-Mbu is a Nigerian lawyer and electoral official who served as the acting national chairperson of the Independent National Electoral Commission (INEC) from 7 to 9 October 2025.

She was automatically appointed after the retirement of Mahmood Yakubu in compliance with INEC's internal succession procedure, which directs the most senior commissioner to assume leadership in an acting capacity before a substantive chairperson is appointed.

== Early life and education ==
An indigene of Delta State, she was born in Kano and received her early education at St. Louis Secondary School. In 1984, she obtained a Bachelor of Laws (LL.B.) degree from the University of Ife (presently known as Obafemi Awolowo University). The following year, in 1985, she was called to the Nigerian Bar.

== Legal career ==
After being called to the bar in 1985, she proceeded to the College of Law, London, where she qualified as a solicitor of the Supreme Court of England and Wales. She obtained a Master of Laws (LL.M.) degree with a specialization in commercial and corporate law from Queen Mary and Westfield College, University of London. She also completed postgraduate programs in international dispute resolution and international business law. She is recognized as an expert in alternative dispute resolution and is a member of the Chartered Institute of Arbitrators, United Kingdom (Nigeria Branch), where she previously served as secretary.

From March 2010 to November 2011, she held the position of sole solicitor on the Presidential Projects Assessment Committee (PPAC), where she was responsible for assessing a wide range of incomplete federal infrastructure projects across Nigeria. In March 2016, she was appointed to the ministerial committee established to develop a strategic roadmap for the solid minerals sector.

Before joining the Independent National Electoral Commission (INEC) as a national commissioner, she led the Lagos-based law firm Norfolk Partners as its managing partner. She also edited Thisday Lawyer, a weekly legal feature published by Thisday newspaper. Between 2014 and 2016, she contributed over a hundred opinion pieces through her column "Legal Eagle", which examined legal developments and policy matters in Nigeria. Her long-standing involvement in governance-related projects helped establish her reputation as a commentator on law and public affairs.

== Electoral career ==
Before assuming the position of acting national chairperson, she served as a national commissioner of the Independent National Electoral Commission (INEC) beginning in 2016, and was reappointed for a second term in 2021 as the representative of Delta State, making her the longest-serving member of the commission.

She also led INEC's Legal Services, Clearance, and Complaints Committee (LSCCC), a central body tasked with managing legal compliance and the vetting of electoral candidates.
