= Okon Uya =

Nigerian academic (1947–2014)

Okon Edet Uya

Chairman of the National Electoral Commission of Nigeria
- In office 1993 – 19 November 1993nexcx
- Preceded by: Humphrey Nwosu
- Succeeded by: Sumner Dagogo-Jack

Personal details
- Born: 12 June 1947 Akwa-Ibom
- Died: 17 April 2014 (aged 66)

Okon Edet Uya (12 June 1947 – 17 April 2014) was briefly the chairman of the National Electoral Commission of Nigeria, appointed by President Ibrahim Babangida after the presidential elections of the 12 June 1993 had been annulled and the previous chairman, Humphrey Nwosu, dismissed. Uya was of Oron origin. He spent six years as a senior official in Nigeria's diplomatic corps, serving as Nigeria's ambassador in Argentina, Peru, Paraguay and Chile, based in Buenos Aires. When a professor of history at the University of Calabar, Uya was appointed to conduct a new presidential poll after the annulment of the 12 June 1993 election. The National Republican Convention and Social Democratic Party were asked to present new candidates for a poll that it was hoped would be held by March 1994. But the confusion that followed the annulment crisis prevented Uya from conducting the election before General Sani Abacha assumed power and dismissed him from his office. He later became the Deputy Vice Chancellor and acting Vice Chancellor of the University of Calabar. The last undergraduate course that he taught concerned the Atlantic slave trade.

== Bibliography ==
- Okon Edet Uya (1969). From servitude to service: Robert Smalls, 1839-1915. University of Wisconsin--Madison. p. 568.
- Okon Edet Uya (1971). From slavery to public service: Robert Smalls, 1839-1915. Oxford University Press. pp. 178.
- Okon Edet Uya (1984). A history of Oron people of the lower Cross River basin. Manson Pub. Co. p. 193. ISBN 978-2451-00-2.
- Okon Uya (1992). The African Diaspora and the Black Experience in New World Slavery. Okpaku Communications Corp. ISBN 0-89388-224-0.
- Sunday W. Petters; Edet R. Iwok; Okon Edet Uya (1994). Akwa Ibom State: the land of promise: a compendium. Gabumo Pub. Co. p. 377. ISBN 978-010-216-7.
- Okon Edet Uya (2000). Civil society and the consolidation of democracy in Nigeria. CATS Pub. p. 465.
- Okon Edet Uya (2004). Education for sustainable democracy: the Nigerian experience. IPPA, University of Calabar. p. 625.
- Okon Edet Uya; Sunday W. Petters (2004). Knowledge for service: the University of Calabar, 1975-2002. University of Calabar Press. p. 396. ISBN 978-007-130-X.
- Okon Edet Uya (2005). The efik and their neighbours: historical perspectives. Cats Publishers & Clear Lines Publications. p. 276.
