= Resident Electoral Commissioner =

INEC title of person in-charge of electoral commission on state

In Nigeria, Resident Electoral Commissioner (REC) is a title given to a person in charge of the Independent National Electoral Commission at the state level. The Resident Electoral Commissioner, assisted by relevant government agencies, undertakes the Presidential, National Assembly, Gubernatorial and House of Assembly elections in a state. The Resident Electoral Commissioner acts pursuant to powers delegated to him or her by INEC's national Chairman and 12 Commissioners. Among the duties of the REC is to make available all the materials required to conduct an election. The REC also monitors the activities of all ad hoc staff and provides for proper verification of election results.

== See also ==
- INEC Rivers State Branch
