= Smart Card Reader =

Portable electronic voting device used in Nigeria

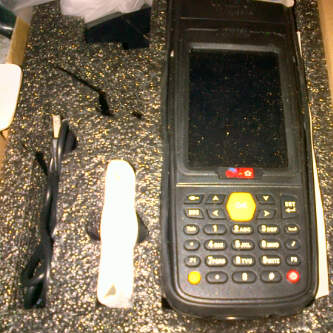
INEC card reader, a device that was used for the Nigerian general election, held on March 28, 2015

The Smart Card Reader (SCR) is an electronic voting authentication device configured to read only the Permanent Voter Cards (PVCs) issued by the Independent National Electoral Commission (INEC) in Nigeria. The card reader was designed for the accreditation process (authentication of eligible voters before voting). The machine was configured to read only the PVCs of a particular polling unit and can only work on election day.

== Operation ==
The device uses a cryptographic technology with an ultra-low power consumption and processing frequency of 1.2 GHz and uses Android 4.0.0

It is positioned by its operators (usually trained INEC officials) to read the embedded chip on the Personal Voter Card (PVC). This card is placed into the device, which then displays the voter's details. The voter places their thumb on the device, and their identity is confirmed through Fingerprint authentication. It usually takes about 10 to 20 seconds to validate a voter.

On completion of accreditation process, a "Close V" key is used to complete the accreditation process and the total number of voters accredited can be previewed using a "Query" key. Afterwards, the result may be forwarded to INEC using the "Communication" key.

The card reader was first used for Nigeria's presidential election held on March 28, 2015.
