= Humphrey Nwosu =

Nigerian civil servant (1941–2024)

Chairman of the National Electoral Commission of Nigeria
- In office 1989–1993
- Preceded by: Eme Awa
- Succeeded by: Okon Uya

Personal details
- Born: 2 October 1941 Anambra State, Colony and Protectorate of Nigeria
- Died: 20 October 2024 (aged 83) Virginia, U.S.

Humphrey Nwosu (2 October 1941 – 20 October 2024) was a Nigerian civil servant who was chairman of the National Electoral Commission (NEC). Appointed by President Ibrahim Babangida, he held office from 1989 to 1993.

== Early life and career ==
Nwosu was born on 2 October 1941. He became a professor of political science at the University of Nigeria, Nsukka. Nwosu served in the cabinet of Samson Omeruah, governor of the old Anambra State, where he helped traditional rulers to gain staffs of office, receive salaries and settled intra and inter community land disputes. He also served as chairman of a Federal Technical Committee on the application of Civil Service Reforms in the local government service. Nwosu was appointed NEC chairman in 1989 after his predecessor (and former mentor) Eme Awa resigned due to a disagreement with Ibrahim Babangida.

== 12 June 1993 elections ==
Nwosu conducted the 12 June 1993 election which was seen as the freest and fairest election, in which Chief Moshood Abiola won. Nwosu's commission introduced the novel Option A4 voting system and the Open ballot system. Nwosu had released many of the election results when he was ordered to stop further announcement by the military regime. In 2008 he published a book in which he claimed that Babangida was not to blame for annulling the election. The book was severely criticized for failing to accurately account for what happened.

== Death ==
Nwosu died in Maryland, United States on 20 October 2024, at the age of 83.

== Bibliography ==
- Humphrey N. Nwosu (1977). Political Authority and the Nigerian Civil Service. Fourth Dimension. ISBN 978-156-006-1.
- Humphrey N. Nwosu, ed. (1985). Problems of Nigerian administration: a book of readings. Fourth Dimension Publishers. ISBN 978-156-104-1.
- Humphrey N. Nwosu; Ray Ofoegbu (1986). Introduction to politics. Fourth Dimension. p. 325. ISBN 978-156-233-1.
- Humphrey N. Nwosu (1991). Conduct of free and fair elections in Nigeria: speeches, comments and reflections. National Electoral Commission.
- Humphrey N. Nwosu (2008). Laying the foundation for Nigeria's democracy: my account of June 12, 1993 presidential election and its annulment. Macmillan Nigeria. p. 392.
