= Eyo Esua =

Nigerian teacher and trade unionist (1901–1973)

Chairman of the Federal Electoral Commission
- In office 1964–1966
- Succeeded by: Michael Ani

Personal details
- Born: Eyo Ita Esua; 14 January 1901 Cross River State, Nigeria
- Died: 6 December 1973 (aged 72)

Eyo Ita Esua (14 January 1901 – 6 December 1973) was a Nigerian teacher and trade unionist who was at the helm of the Balewa's government's Federal Electoral Commission in the Nigerian First Republic.

Esua was a school master and a founder member of the Nigeria Union of Teachers. He was the first full-time general secretary of the union from 1943 until his retirement in 1964. He was an Efik, Calabar man, renowned for his dedication to duty and uprightness.

The Esua-led commission organized the December 1964 election, which was mired in controversy. Two members of the commission disagreed with the chairman and resigned from the commission. Esua also conducted the 1965 Western Region election, which was violent and was disputed by the opposition United Party Grand Alliance. A few days before these elections Esua acknowledged that his organisation could not guarantee a free and fair poll. The widespread electoral abuses may have been a factor in the success of the military coup of January 1966 in which Major General Johnson Aguiyi-Ironsi came to power.
