= Abubakar Balarabe Mahmoud =

Nigerian lawyer

- Born: 15 January 1955 (age 71); Kano State
- Education: LLB LLM BL; Ahmadu Bello University, Zaria Nigerian Law School Lagos
- Years active: 2009–present
- Organization: National Judicial Council (Nigeria)
- Known for: Principle
- Title: Senior Advocate of Nigeria (SAN)
- Awards: OON SAN

Abubakar Balarabe "A.B." Mahmoud SAN (born 15 January 1955) is a Nigerian lawyer who served as president of the Nigerian Bar Association from 2016 to 2018. He also served as pro-chancellor of Kano University of Science and Technology Wudil.

== Early life and education ==
AB Mahmoud was born in Kano State and started his primary education in Kano, he attended Ahmadu Bello University, Zaria, where he obtained a Bachelor of Laws in 1979 and a Master of Laws in 1984. He attended the Nigerian Law School and was called to the bar in May 1979.

== Career ==
Mahmoud began his career in 1979 as a state counsel with the Kano State Ministry of Justice. He later rose to Attorney General and Commissioner for Justice of Kano State. He resigned and founded the law firm Dikko & Mahmoud in 1993. That same year, he was elected chairman of the Nigerian Bar Association, Kano Branch. He became a Senior Advocate of Nigeria in 2001 and served as president of the Nigerian Bar Association from 2016 to 2018. He has also served as the first vice president of the Nigerian Stock Exchange He is counsel to former Central Bank of Nigeria governor and 14th and 16th Emir of Kano, Sanusi Lamido Sanusi.
