= Michael Ani =

Chairman of the Federal Electoral Commission
- In office 15 November 1976 – 1979
- Preceded by: Eyo Esua
- Succeeded by: Victor Ovie Whisky

Personal details
- Born: 30 November 1917; Cross River State, Nigeria
- Died: 18 December 1985 (age 68)

Michael Ani (30 November 1917 – 18 December 1985) was chairman of the Federal Electoral Commission (FEDECO) established by General Olusegun Obasanjo to conduct elections leading to the Nigerian Second Republic, which was inaugurated on 1 October 1979. He held office from 1976 to 1979.

Michael Ani was a civil servant. In 1966 he had been appointed a Commissioner by Ironsi to assist in reviewing unification of the regional public services. His 1976 appointment followed his retirement from the Civil Service. The functions of his 24-man Federal Electoral Commission established on 15 November 1976 included the conduct of elections, delimitation of constituencies and registration of political parties. The August 1979 presidential election was won by Alhaji Shehu Shagari, although his victory was disputed since it was based on Ani's interpretation of the ambiguous electoral decree which said "a candidate must obtain one quarter of votes cast in at least two thirds of the states of the federation".
