= Eme Awa =

Chairman: National Electoral Commission of Nigeria (1921–2000)

Chairman of the National Electoral Commission of Nigeria (NECON)
- In office 1987–1989
- Preceded by: Victor Ovie Whisky
- Succeeded by: Humphrey Nwosu

Personal details
- Born: 15 December 1921
- Died: 11 March 2000 (aged 78)

Professor Eme Awa (born 15 December 1921 – 11 March 2000) was chairman of the National Electoral Commission of Nigeria (NECON), appointed by President Ibrahim Babangida. He held office from 1987 to 1989, when he resigned due to a disagreement with Babangida.

== Education ==
Awa attended Ohafia Central School, Ohafia between 1928 and 1934. Hope Waddell Training Institute, Calabar between 1935 and 1939, Lincoln University Pennsylvania, US between 1949 and 1951, New York University, US between 1951 and 1955

== Career and political life ==
Eme Awa was a professor of Political Science at the University of Nigeria, Nsukka. Talking about the ethnic unions which rose between the late 1920s and the 1950s, but were later suppressed, Awa said: "The great achievements of the associations in generating among Nigerians loyalty for an ethnic group of several million people, thus paving the way for a broader loyalty for the entire nation was relegated to the background. These organizations were the only ones that had made systematic efforts to instill into the minds of Nigerians ideas of nationality, but their activities had not been properly directed, and the movement had been shunted into regional instead of national lines". He defended democracy, saying that it was not alien to Africa but was based on long traditions, "the type we had in the city states where everyone came out in the market square and expressed their views, either by raising their hands or something like that".

Eme Awa's commission conducted the 1987 Local Government election, which were poorly managed, with irregularities that included a confusing and irregular voters register and overcrowded polling stations. He was the teacher and mentor of Humphrey Nwosu, who succeeded him as NEC chairman. Eme Awa died at the age of 79 in the Holy Cross Hospital in the United States of America in March 2000.

== Bibliography ==
- Eme O. Awa (1955). Regionalism in Nigeria: a study in federalism. New York University. p. 594.
- Eme O. Awa (1964). Federal government in Nigeria. University of California Press. pp. 349.
- Eme O. Awa (1976). Issues in federalism. Ethiope Pub. Corp. p. 117.
