= Kayode Eso =

Nigerian jurist

Chief Kayode Eso CON CFR
- Born: Samuel Obakayode Eso; 18 September 1925; Ilesa, Nigeria Protectorate
- Citizenship: Nigerian
- Occupations: lawyer; solicitor; judge
- Years active: 1953 - 2012
- Notable work: Awolowo v. Shagari case
- Spouses: Helen Aina Eso
- Parent(s): Emmanuel Dada Eso; Rebecca Omotola Eso
- Awards: CON; CFR

Chief Samuel Obakayode "Kayode" Eso, CON, CFR (born 18 September 1925 – 16 November 2012) was a prominent Nigerian jurist. He served as a Justice of the Supreme Court of Nigeria.

== Early life ==
Samuel Obakayode Eso was born on 18 September 1925 at Ilesa, a city in what was then the Nigeria Protectorate. Both of his parents, Emmanuel Dada and Rebecca Omotola Eso, belonged to prominent chieftaincy families amongst the Ijeshas. Emmanuel's father, Chief Ifaturoti, held the Eso chieftaincy title, and it was from this title that their family's surname was derived.

He attended local schools in Nigeria before going on to Trinity College, Dublin, where he obtained bachelor's and master's degrees in Law with a specialization in Legal science in 1953 and 1956 respectively. He then went on to train at the Lincoln's Inn in London, where he was subsequently called to the bar.

== Law career ==
In March 1965, he became the acting Judge of the High Court of Western Nigeria and a few years later, he was appointed to the bench of the Court of Appeal of Western Nigeria as a Justice. In January 1978, he was appointed Chief Judge of the Oyo State Judiciary, a position he held until September 1990, when he was appointed to the bench of the Supreme Court of Nigeria. Professor Yemi Akinseye George, SAN and Professor J. F. Ade Ajayi's book, titled The Making of A Judge, narrates the chronological episodes in the contemporary history of Kayode Eso's judicial activism.

He is one of the members of the 8-man panel of judges at the Supreme Court of Nigeria that presided over the Awolowo v. Shagari case, in which Chief Obafemi Awolowo's petition challenged the declaration of Alhaji Shehu Shagari as the president-elect of the country after the 11 August 1979 presidential election. The court ruled that "Sheu Shagari won two-thirds of the total votes cast, having polled a total tally of 16.8 million with 11.9 million votes ahead of Obafemi Awolowo who polled a total tally of 4.9 million."

== Personal life ==
Chief Eso married Helen Aina (née Agidee) of Akungbene in 1954. They would go on to have two children together, Funmilayo Eso Williams (deceased, Feb. 2021) and Olumide Eso.

Chief Eso died on 16 November 2012 at the age of 87.

== Memberships ==
- Member, Nigerian Bar Association
- Member, International Bar Association
- Member, Nigerian Body of Benchers
