= Ayo Gabriel Irikefe =

Nigerian jurist (1922–1996)

Ayo Gabriel Irikefe GCON SAN OFR CON

Chief Justice of Nigeria
- In office 1985–1987
- Preceded by: George Sodeinde Sowemimo
- Succeeded by: Mohammed Bello

Personal details
- Born: 3 March 1922 Ikorodu, British Nigeria (now Ikorodu, Lagos State, Nigeria)
- Died: 1 August 1996 (aged 74)
- Party: Non-partisian

Chief Ayo Gabriel Irikefe, GCON (3 March 1922 – 1 August 1996) was a Nigerian jurist and chief justice of Nigeria from 1985 to 1987.

== Early life ==
Irikefe was born in March 1922 to the family of Aduwa and Theresa Irikefe. He was born at Ikorodu, a local government area of Lagos State in southwestern Nigeria. He started his education at a CMS school in Okitipupa, then went to St John's School Okitpupa, St Mathews Catholic School, Ode-Ondo and St. Gregory's College, Obalende, Lagos where he obtained the West Africa School Certificate. He initially studied at the College of Marine Engineering and Communications, Manchester between 1945 and 1946 before deciding to study law in 1949.

== Law career ==
He was called to the English Bar on 1 July 1952, the same year he established his own law firm. He was in legal practice in Warri from 1952 until 1955. In 1955, he rose to the position of a Crown Counsel to the Western Region of Nigeria where he served at Ibadan and later transferred to Benin city. He was a leading counsel to the committee that probed the activities of the Owegbe cult and was later appointed a judge in the High Court of Mid-Western Nigeria. In 1966, he became the Attorney General of the Mid-Western State, a position he held until he was appointed to the bench of the Supreme Court of Nigeria as Justice. In 1985 he became a member of the Nigerian Body of Benchers, the same year he was appointed as the Chief Justice of Nigeria to succeed George Sodeinde Sowemimo.

Irikefe retired in 1985 having attained the statutory retirement age of 65.

In 1975, he was made chairman of the panel on the creation of states and in 1980, Irikefe was appointed chairman of the Crude Oil Sales Tribunal to look into allegations of missing funds within the Nigerian petroleum corporation.
