= Taslim Olawale Elias =

Chief Justice of Nigeria from 1972 to 1975

Taslim Olawale Elias GCON QC LLD CFR
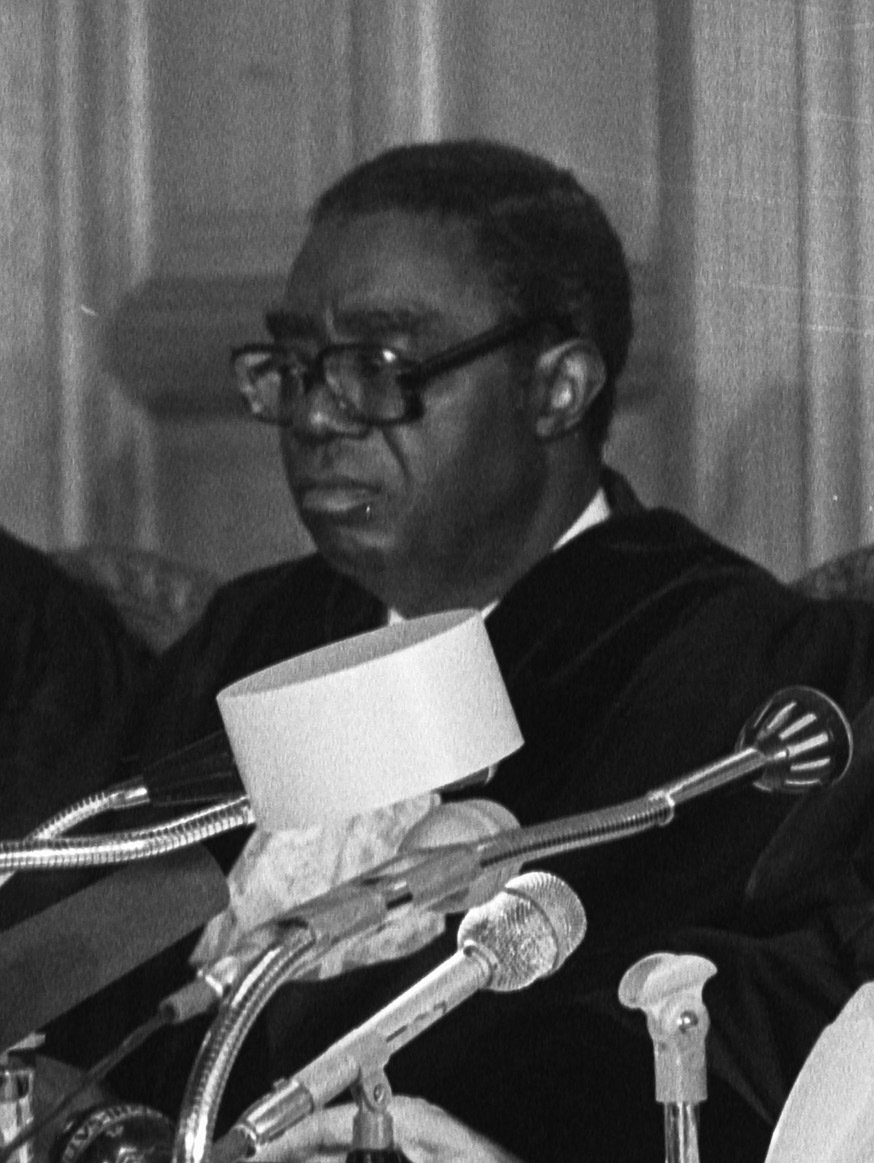
- Elias in 1979

President of the International Court of Justice
- In office 1982–1985

Vice-President of the International Court of Justice
- In office 1979–1982
- President: Humphrey Waldock

Judge of the International Court of Justice
- In office 1976–1991
- Preceded by: Charles D. Onyeama
- Succeeded by: Prince Bola Ajibola

Chief Justice of Nigeria
- In office 1972–1975
- Preceded by: Adetokunbo Ademola
- Succeeded by: Darnley Arthur Alexander

Minister for Justice and Attorney General of Nigeria
- In office 1960–1966
- Prime Minister: Abubakar Tafawa Balewa

Personal details
- Born: 11 November 1914 Lagos, British Nigeria
- Died: 14 August 1991 (aged 76) Lagos, Nigeria
- Education: University College, London (BA, LLB, LLM, PhD); Igbobi College, Lagos

Taslim Olawale Elias GCON (11 November 1914 – 14 August 1991) was a Nigerian jurist who served as minister of Justice and attorney-general of Nigeria from 1960 to 1966, Chief Justice of Nigeria from 1972 to 1975 and president of the International Court of Justice from 1982 to 1985. He was a scholar who modernised and extensively revised the laws of Nigeria.

== Early life and education ==
Taslim Olawale Elias was born into the traditional aristocracy of Lagos, then the capital of Nigeria, on 11 November 1914. He received his secondary education at the Church Missionary Society Grammar School and Igbobi College in Lagos. He married Ganiat Yetunde Fowosere, and the couple would have five children together (three sons, including Olufemi Elias a lawyer, and two daughters). After passing the Cambridge School Certificate examination, he worked as an assistant in the Government Audit Department. In 1935 he joined the Nigerian Railway and served in the Chief Accountant's Office for nine years.

While working at the Nigerian Railway, Elias became an external student of the University of London, and later he passed the intermediate examinations for the BA and LLB degrees. He left Nigeria for the United Kingdom in 1944 and was admitted to University College London. As this was during World War II, with London the target of frequent bomb attacks, he spent some time at Cambridge's Trinity College. He graduated with a BA the year he entered University College London and two years later received the LLB. In 1947, he was called to the bar at the Inner Temple, where he was a Yarborough Anderson Scholar, and in the same year received his LLM degree. He continued his graduate education and became the first African to earn a PhD in law from the University of London in 1949.

In 1951, Elias was awarded a UNESCO Fellowship to undertake research into the legal, economic, and social problems of Africa. Later that year he had his first academic appointment, the Simon Senior Research Fellow at Manchester University. There he was an instructor in law and social anthropology. It was also in 1951 that he published his first book, Nigerian Land Law and Custom.

== Professional life ==
Elias moved from Manchester to Oxford in 1954, when he became the Oppenheimer Research Fellow at the Institute of Commonwealth Studies, Nuffield College and Queen Elizabeth House. He continued his research into Nigerian law and published Groundwork of Nigerian Law in the same year. In 1956, he was a visiting professor of political science at the University of Delhi. He was instrumental in organizing courses in government, law, and social anthropology and in establishing the African Studies Department. Elias also lectured at the universities of Aligarh, Allahabad, Bombay, and Calcutta. In that year he also published two books, Makers of Nigerian Law and The Nature of African Customary Law.

He returned to London in 1957 and was appointed a governor of the School of Oriental and African Studies. As the constitutional and legal adviser to the National Council of Nigeria and the Cameroons (which later became the National Convention of Nigerian Citizens), he participated in the 1958 Nigerian Constitutional Conference in London. He was one of the architects of Nigeria's independence constitution

In 1960, Elias was invited to become Nigeria's attorney-general and minister of justice. He served in this capacity through the whole of the first republic. Although later dismissed after the coup d'état in January 1966, he was reinstated in November of that year.

In addition to contributing to Nigerian and African law, Elias had long been active in the field of international law. He was a member of the United Nations International Law Commission from 1961 to 1975, he served as General Rapporteur from 1965 to 1966 and was its chairman in 1970. He was the leader of the Nigerian delegations to the conference held to consider the Draft Convention on the Settlement of Investment Disputes between States and Nationals of Other States in 1963 and to the Special Committee on the Principles of International Law concerning Friendly Relations and Co-operation among States in 1964. He was a member of the United Nations Committee of Experts, which drafted the constitution of the Congo, 1961–1962. He also helped to draft the charter of the Organization of African Unity (OAU), and its Protocol of Mediation, Conciliation and Arbitration. Elias also represented the OAU and Nigeria before the International Court of Justice in the proceedings concerning the status of Namibia. He was elected as an associate member of the Institut de droit international in 1969. He was chairman of the Committee of the Whole at the Vienna Conference on the Law of Treaties (1968–1969).

In 1966, Elias was appointed professor and dean of the Faculty of Law at the University of Lagos. Four years earlier he had received the LLD degree from the University of London for his work on African law and British colonial law. (He would go on to receive a total of 17 honorary doctorate degrees from various universities around the world). He was one of the inaugural recipients of the Nigerian National Merit Award in 1979. Several of his works on various legal subjects were standard reading in Africa in law schools of the former British colonies.

Later in 1966, Elias was re-appointed as Nigeria's attorney-general and commissioner for justice (a position he held while remaining dean and professor at the University of Lagos), until 1972, when he became Chief Justice of the Supreme Court of Nigeria. He was ousted from this position by a military regime that took power in Nigeria at the end of July 1975.

A few months later (in October 1975), he was elected by the General Assembly and the Security Council of the United Nations to the International Court of Justice at The Hague. In 1979, he was elected vice-president by his colleagues on that court. In 1981, after the death of Sir Humphrey Waldock, the president of the court, Elias took over as acting president. In 1982, the members of the court elected him president of the court. He thus became the first African jurist to hold that honour. Five years later, Elias was also appointed to the Permanent Court of Arbitration at The Hague.

== Death ==
Elias died on 14 August 1991, in Lagos, Nigeria.

== See also ==
- United Nations Security Council Resolution 708
