= Andrews Otutu Obaseki =

Nigerian jurist and Supreme Court Justice (1926-2017)

- Born: 11 June 1926; Benin City, Edo State, Nigeria
- Died: 13 July 2017 (aged 91); Benin City, Edo State, Nigeria
- Citizenship: Nigerian
- Occupations: lawyer; solicitor; judge
- Years active: 1940–2017
- Awards: CON

Andrews Otutu Obaseki, CON (11 June 1926 – 13 July 2017) was a Nigerian jurist and Justice of the Supreme Court of Nigeria.

== Early life ==
Obaseki was born on 11 June 1926 in Benin City, the capital of Edo State, southern Nigeria. He was educated a College where he obtained the West Africa School Certificate in 1940 and later proceeded to Hope Waddell Training Institute in Calabar. After he spent two years in the training institute, he spent another 2 years at School of Agriculture at Moor Plantation, Ibadan. In 1948 he left to the London School of Economics where he was trained as a legal practitioner.

== Law career ==
In 1975 he was appointed to the bench of the Supreme Court of Nigeria as Justice and retired in 1991. In his reflection on the Nigerian Judiciary, he quoted that " Justice in the courts is the same whether in native courts, High Courts or Supreme Courts; the measure is the same and it is only when there is an error in the application of the substantive law that the different levels come in to make the necessary correction".
