= Mahmood Yakubu =

Nigerian academic

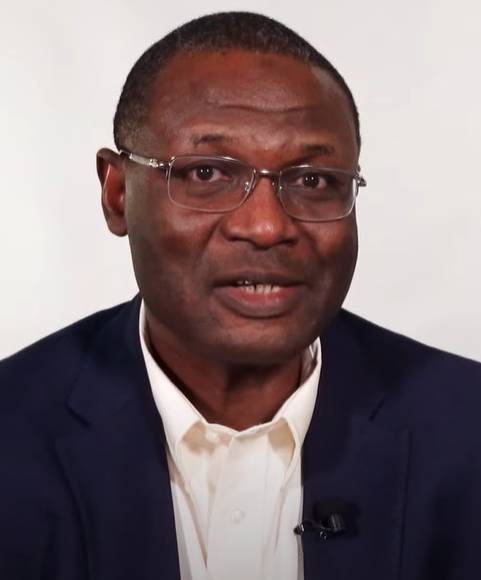
- Yakubu, 2022

Chairman of Independent National Electoral Commission
- In office 9 November 2015 – 7 October 2025
- Preceded by: Amina Zakari
- Succeeded by: May Agbamuche-Mbu

Personal details
- Born: 1962 (age 63–64) Bauchi State, Nigeria
- Education: University of Sokoto; Wolfson College, Cambridge; University of Oxford

Mahmood Yakubu (born 1962) is a Nigerian academic who served as the chairman of the Independent National Electoral Commission (INEC) from 2015 to 2025. He was appointed by President Muhammadu Buhari on 21 October 2015, succeeding acting chairman, Amina Zakari.

== Early life and education ==
Yakubu was born in Bauchi State, Nigeria. He completed his primary and secondary school education at Kobi Primary School and Government Teachers College, Toro, respectively. He proceeded to the University of Sokoto (now Usmanu Danfodiyo University), where he obtained a first-class degree in history. He had his master's degree in international relations in 1987 from Wolfson College, Cambridge, and doctorate degree in Nigerian history from the University of Oxford in 1991. He was offered scholarship by the Bauchi State Government to study at the universities of Cambridge and Oxford. Yakubu was the recipient of the Overseas Research Scholarship, and he also won the Commonwealth Scholarship from the Association of Commonwealth Universities.

== Career ==
Yakubu is a lecturer and professor of political history and international studies at the Nigerian Defence Academy. Prior to his appointment as chairman of the Independent National Electoral Commission (INEC), Yakubu was appointed as the executive secretary of the Tertiary Education Trust Fund in 2007 by President Umaru Musa Yar'Adua. Yakubu also served as assistant secretary of finance and administration at the 2014 National Conference.

== Works ==
- Crisis and conflict management in Nigeria since 1980 (2005). Nigerian Defence Academy ISBN 978-978-135-140-2
- Western Education in Northern Nigeria: Challenges and Strategies (1996). National Gamji Memorial Club ISBN 978-978-32931-0-6
- Emirs and politicians: reform, reaction and recrimination in Northern Nigeria, 1950-1966 (2006). Baraka ISBN 978-978-32931-5-1
