= Victor Ovie Whisky =

Chairman of the Federal Electoral Commission
- In office 1980–1983
- Preceded by: Michael Ani
- Succeeded by: Eme Awa

Personal details
- Born: 6 April 1923 Ikiwewu Agbarho, Delta State, Nigeria
- Died: 18 July 2012 (aged 89)

Justice Victor Ovie Whisky (6 April 1923 – 18 July 2012) was chairman of the Federal Electoral Commission (FEDECO) appointed by President Shehu Shagari during the Nigerian Second Republic. He held office from 1980 to 1983.

== Biography ==
Whiskey attended King's College Lagos, Yaba Higher College and University College, Ibadan (now University of Ibadan). He is noted as being the leader of the 1944 Kings College boys strike against the colonial government of the time. He worked as a clerk, and for a short period as a teacher, before being admitted to study law at the University of London. He was called to the bar in 1952. He practiced as a lawyer until 1960 when he became a magistrate in Western Region. In 1963 he was appointed chief magistrate of the newly formed Mid-Western Region, renamed Bendel State in 1976.

At the time of Ovie-Whisky's 1980 appointment as head of FEDECO he was the Chief Judge of Bendel State, and was seen as upright and non-partisan. However, the general elections of 1983 were marred by widespread irregularities and the electoral officials were accused of rigging the results in favor of the National Party of Nigeria (NPN). Ovie-Whisky declared that he was largely satisfied with the electoral process in 1983, but said: "We did not expect to be perfect". He denied wrongdoing, and when questioned by reporters on whether "water passed under the bridge" in the elections, he said that he would faint if he saw N1 million cash.

In April 2009 the Ijaw Monitoring Group said Ovie-Whisky was in poor health and his condition required urgent attention from the Delta State Government.
